= List of companies of Yemen =

Location of Yemen

Yemen is an Arab country in Western Asia at the southern end of the Arabian Peninsula. It was also historically referred to as Southern Arabia or Arabia Felix, which translates to Happy Arabia in Latin. As of 2013, the country had a GDP (ppp) of US$92.8 billion, with an income per capita of $5,000. Services are the largest economic sector (61.4% of GDP), followed by the industrial sector (30.9%), and agriculture (7.7%). Of these, petroleum production represents around 25% of GDP and 63% of the government's revenue.

Yemen's industrial sector is centered on crude oil production and petroleum refining, food processing, handicrafts, small-scale production of cotton textiles and leather goods, aluminum products, commercial ship repair, cement, and natural gas production. As of 2013, Yemen had an industrial production growth rate of 4.8%. It also has large proven reserves of natural gas. Yemen's first liquified natural gas plant began production in October 2009.

== Notable firms ==
This list includes notable companies with primary headquarters located in the country. The industry and sector follow the Industry Classification Benchmark taxonomy. Organizations which have ceased operations are included and noted as defunct.

Notable companies Status: P=Private, S=State; A=Active, D=Defunct
Name	Industry	Sector	Headquarters	Founded	Notes	Status	
Aden Airways	Consumer services	Airlines	Aden	1949	Airline, defunct 1967	P	D
Almasirah	Consumer services	Broadcasting & entertainment	Sana'a	2012	Houthi-owned	P	A
Alyemda	Consumer services	Airlines	Aden	1971	Airline, defunct 1996	P	D
Central Bank of Yemen	Financials	Banks	Sana'a	1971	Central bank	S	A
Felix Airways	Consumer services	Airlines	Sana'a	2008	Low-cost airline, part of Yemenia	S	A
Gold Mohur Hotel	Consumer services	Hotels	Aden	1999	Resort hotel	P	A
Hayel Saeed Anam Group	Conglomerate	Multinational family-owned business group	Taiz	1938	Food & Consumers Goods Manufacturing, Energy & Utilities, etc	P	A
Sabafon	Telecommunications	ICT	Sana'a	2001	Regional Telecommunications	P	A
Sultan Palace Hotel	Consumer services	Hotels	Sana'a	1987	Hotel	P	A
Tadhamon Bank	Banking	Finance	Sana'a	1995	Banking & Finance in Yemen	P	A
Yemenia	Consumer services	Airlines	Sana'a	1962	Flag carrier of Yemen	S	A
YemenSoft	Software	Finance	Sana'a	1993	International software manufacturer	S	A
Yemen LNG	Refiner	Refines oil & gas in Yemen	Balhaf	1995	Mineral resource extractor	P	A
Yemen Mobile	Telecommunications	Mobile telecommunications	Sana'a	2004	Mobile network	P	A
Yemen Oil and Gas Corporation	State-owned refiner	Manages Yemeni resources	Sana'a	1996	Mineral resource extractor	P	A
Yemen Post	Consumer services	Publishing	Sana'a	2007	Newspaper	P	A
Yemen TV	Consumer services	Broadcasting & entertainment	Sana'a	1975	National television	S	A

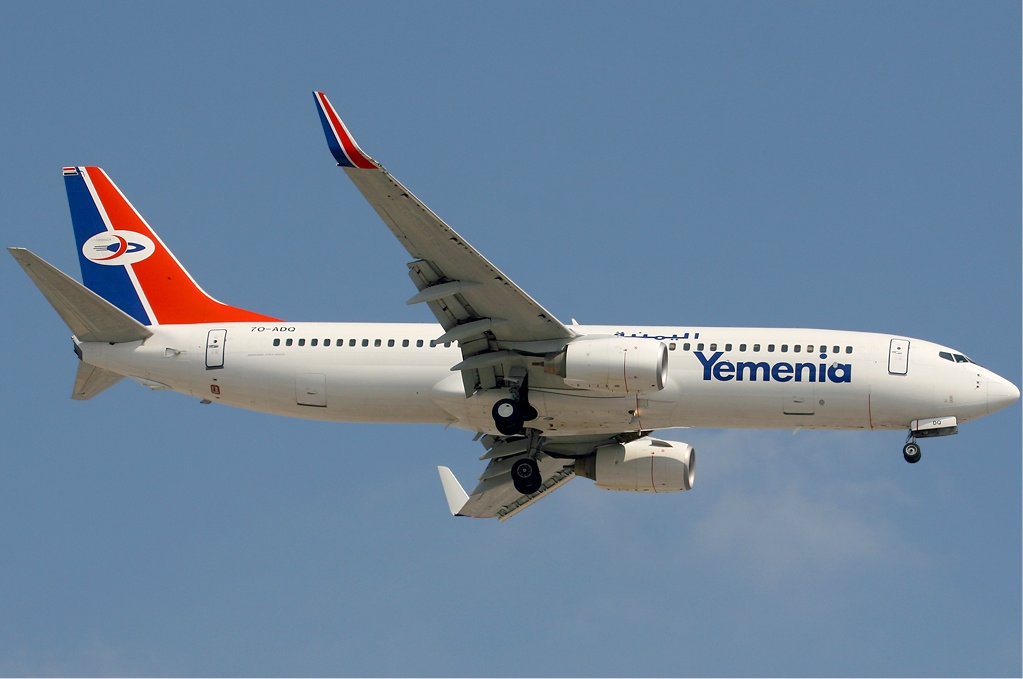
A Yemenia Boeing 737-800 in Dubai.

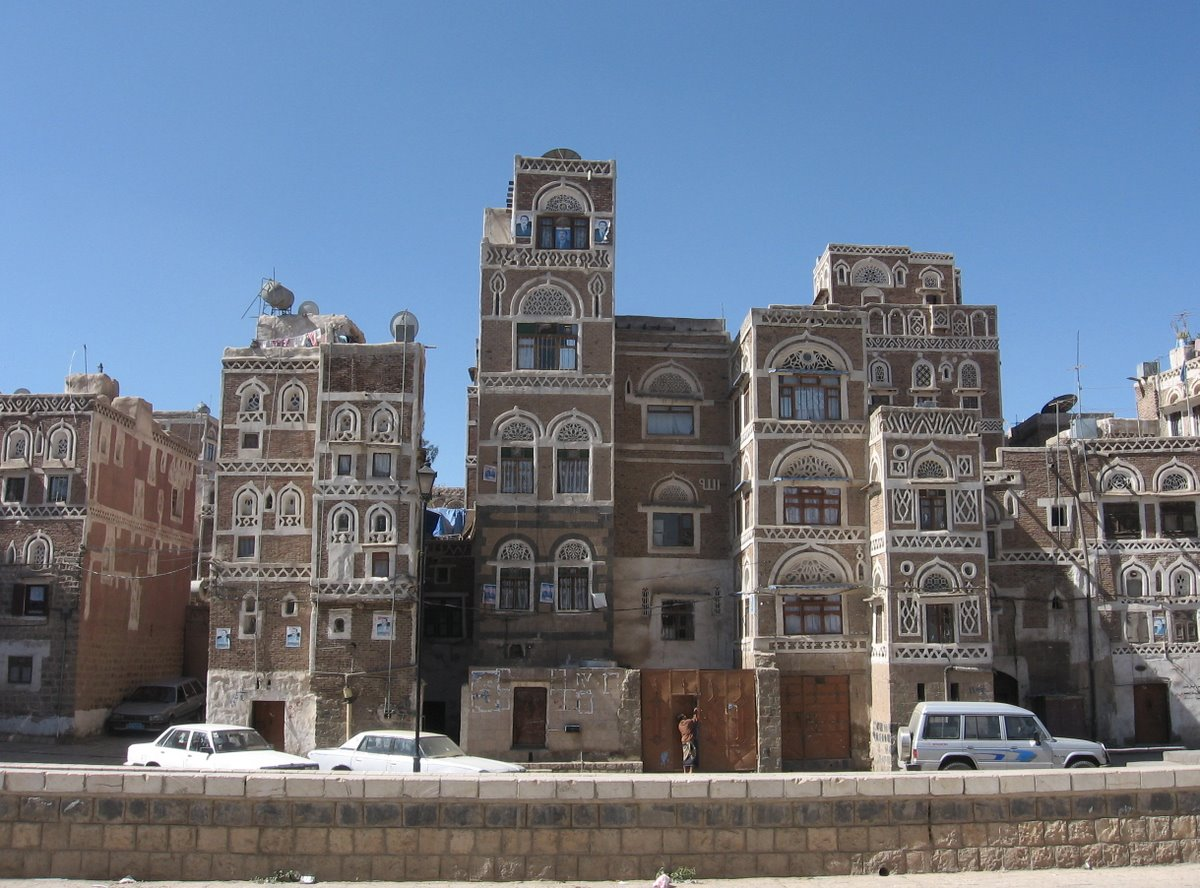
The Arabia Felix Hotel in Sana'a.

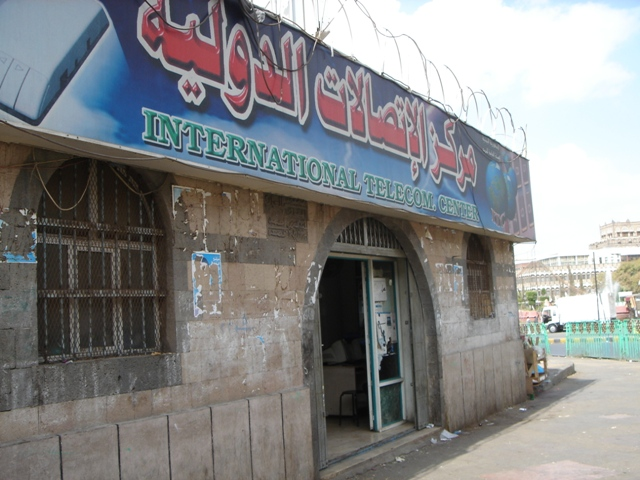
Internet cafe in Sana'a.

== See also ==
- Economy of Yemen
