= Felix Airways =

Airline in Yemen

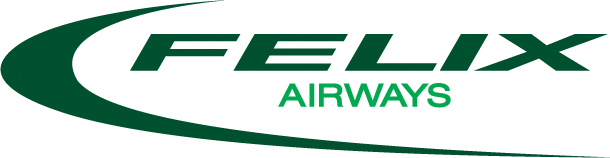
IATA	ICAO	Call sign
FF	FXX	FELIX
- Founded: 26 October 2008
- Fleet size: 3
- Destinations: 5
- Parent company: Yemenia, Al-Tayyar Travel & Tourism Agency, ICD, NTTB
- Headquarters: Sanaa, Yemen
- Key people: Mohammed Al-Arrasha (Chairman and CEO)
- Website: www.felixairways.com

Felix Airways Limited, also known as Al Saeeda, (both meaning "Happy," from the Roman term for Yemen, Arabia Felix) is an inoperative regional airline based in Sanaa, Yemen. As of January 2026, it operates no flights and has a status of "Idle". In the past, the airline operated flights on a limited basis up until 2019.

== History ==
The airline was established in 2008 as a subsidiary of flag carrier Yemenia by the Islamic Bank for Development, to serve the growing market for low-cost travel in the region. In late October 2008, Felix Airways began domestic operations with CRJ 700 aircraft, and expanded both domestically and regionally.

Operations have been severely disrupted since 2015 due to the ongoing military conflict affecting its hub at Sanaa International Airport. From 2015 the airline, in common with the entire Yemeni tourist industry, suffered a near-complete reduction in activity due to the conflict and the siege in the region; Felix Airways flights were reported (in April 2019) to have declined from 55 to only 3 weekly flights. The airline originally also had two Bombardier CRJ700s, but one was destroyed by bombing at Sanaa International Airport in April 2015.

== Destinations ==
=== Current destinations ===
As of February 2021, Felix Airways serves the following scheduled destinations:

Djibouti

- Djibouti - Djibouti–Ambouli International Airport

Yemen

- Aden - Aden International Airport
- Seiyun - Sayun Airport
- Socotra - Socotra Airport

United Arab Emirates

- Dubai - Dubai International Airport

=== Former destinations ===
As of January 2015 (before the air blockade), Felix Airways served the following destinations:

City	Country	Airport	Notes	Refs
Abha	Saudi Arabia	Abha Regional Airport		
Aden	Yemen	Aden International Airport	Base	
Al Ghaydah	Yemen	Al Ghaydah Airport		
Hodeidah	Yemen	Hodeidah International Airport		
Mukalla	Yemen	Riyan Airport		
Ataq	Yemen	Ataq Airport		
Dammam	Saudi Arabia	King Fahd International Airport		
Hargeisa	Somaliland	Hargeisa International Airport		
Jeddah	Saudi Arabia	King Abdulaziz International Airport		
Mogadishu	Somalia	Aden Adde International Airport		
Sanaa	Yemen	Sanaa International Airport	Base	
Seiyun	Yemen	Sayun Airport		
Sharjah	United Arab Emirates	Sharjah International Airport		
Socotra	Yemen	Socotra Airport		
Taiz	Yemen	Taiz International Airport		

== See also ==
- List of airlines of Yemen
