= List of defunct airlines of Yemen =

This is a list of defunct airlines from Yemen including South Yemen and the Aden Protectorate.

== Defunct airlines ==
Airline	Image	IATA	ICAO	Callsign	Commenced operations	Ceased operations	Notes
Aden Airways					1949	1967	
Alyemda		DY	DYA	ALYEMDA	1971	1992	Merged into Alyemda Air Yemen
Alyemda Air Yemen		DY	DYA	Air Yemen	1992	1995	Merged into Alyemen Airlines of Yemen
Alyemen Airlines of Yemen		DY	DYA		1995	1996	Merged into Yemenia
Blue Bird Aviation (Yemen)			BBY		2013		
Yemen Airlines					1954	1961	Renamed/merged to Yemen Airways
Yemen Airways					1961	1967	Renamed/merged to Yemen Arab Airlines
Yemen Arab Airlines					1967	1972	Renamed/merged to Yemen Airways
Yemen Airways		YI			1972	1978	Renamed/merged to Yemenia

== See also ==
- List of airlines of Yemen
- List of airports in Yemen
