= List of airports in Yemen =

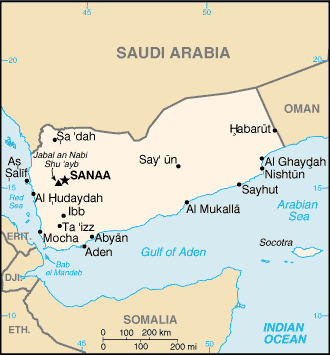
Map of Yemen

Yemen, officially the Republic of Yemen, is a country located in West Asia, occupying the southwestern to southern end of the Arabian Peninsula. It is bordered by Saudi Arabia to the north, the Red Sea to the west, the Gulf of Aden and Arabian Sea to the south, and Oman to the east. The capital and largest city of Yemen is Sana'a. Yemen is divided into twenty governorates (muhafazah) and the Capital district. The governorates are subdivided into 333 districts (muderiah), which are subdivided into 2,210 sub-districts, and then into 38,284 villages (as of 2001).

On 28 March 2015, a no-fly zone was imposed over the country by the Royal Saudi Air Force as part of the Saudi-led intervention in the Yemeni civil war. The blockade was lifted in November 2015 and reinstated in February 2016. The blockade was lifted in November 2017. Flights were cancelled once again, for four days (28-31 January 2018), but resumed on 1 February 2018.

== Airports ==
Airport names shown in bold currently have scheduled passenger service on commercial airlines (post-blockade, only flights approved by the Saudi-led alliance are permitted).

| Location | Governorate | ICAO | IATA | Airport name | Coordinates |
|---|---|---|---|---|---|
| Abs (Abbse) | Hajjah | OYAB | EAB | Abs Airport (Abbse Airport) | 16°00′40″N 43°10′40″E |
| Aden | Aden | OYAA | ADE | **Aden International Airport** | 12°49′46″N 045°01′44″E |
| Al Badie | Hadhramaut | OYBA | | Al Badie Airport | 18°43′09.52″N 50°50′12.88″E |
| Al Bayda | Al-Bayda | OYBI | BYD | Al Bayda' Airport | 14°06′20″N 045°26′25″E |
| Al Ghaydah | Al-Mahrah | OYGD | AAY | **Al Ghaydah Airport** | 16°11′30″N 052°10′30″E |
| Albuq (Al Buq, Al Bough) | Saada | OYBQ | BUK | Albuq Airport (Al Bough Airport) | 17°21′00″N 44°37′30″E |
| Ataq | Shabwah | OYAT | AXK | Ataq Airport | 14°33′04″N 046°49′34″E |
| Beihan | Shabwah | OYBN | BHN | Beihan Airport | 14°46′55″N 045°43′12″E |
| Canoxy | Hadhramaut | | | Canoxy Airport | 15°36′6.66″N 49°4′50.36″E |
| Hodeidah | Hodeidah | OYHD | HOD | Hodeidah International Airport | 14°45′11″N 042°58′35″E |
| Kamaran (Kamaran Island) | Hodeidah | OYKM | KAM | Kamaran Airport | 15°21′40″N 42°36′40″E |
| Marib (Ma'rib) | Marib | OYMB | MYN | Marib Airport (construction suspended) | 15°28′10″N 45°19′40″E |
| Mokha | Taiz | OYMK | | Mokha International Airport | 13°17′52.9″N 43°13′54.6″E |
| Mukalla | Hadhramaut | OYRN | RIY | **Riyan International Airport** (Riyan Mukalla Airport) | 14°39′45″N 49°22′30″E |
| Mukeiras (Mukayras) | Abyan | OYMS | UKR | Mukeiras Airport | 13°56′10″N 45°39′20″E |
| Raudha | Shabwah | | RXA | Raudha Airport | 14°27′0″N 47°17′0″E |
| Qishn | Al-Mahrah | OYQN | IHN | Qishn Airport | |
| Saadah (Sa'dah) | Saada | OYSH | SYE | Saadah Airport | 16°58′00″N 43°43′45″E |
| Sanaa | Sanaa | OYSN | SAH | **Sanaa International Airport** | 15°28′35″N 044°13′11″E |
| Seiyun | Hadhramaut | OYSY | GXF | **Seiyun International Airport** (Seiyun Hadhramaut Airport) | 15°57′58″N 048°47′17″E |
| Socotra | Socotra | OYSQ | SCT | **Socotra Airport** | 12°37′50″N 053°54′20″E |
| Taiz | Taiz | OYTZ | TAI | Taiz International Airport | 13°41′09″N 044°08′21″E |

== See also ==
- Transport in Yemen
- List of the busiest airports in the Middle East
- List of airports by ICAO code: O#OY - Yemen
- Wikipedia: WikiProject Aviation/Airline destination lists: Asia#Yemen
