= Alyemda =

National airline of South Yemen

اليمــدا ALYEMDA
IATA	ICAO	Call sign
DY	DYA	ALYEMDA
- Founded: 11 March 1971
- Ceased operations: 1996 (merged into Yemenia)
- Hubs: Aden International Airport
- Parent company: South Yemen Government
- Headquarters: Aden, South Yemen (Yemen from 1990)

Alyemda (Arabic: اليمدا - al-Yamdā), internationally known as Democratic Yemen Airlines or just Yemen Airlines, was the national airline of South Yemen. It was established at Aden on 11 March 1971 after nationalizing Brothers Air Services (BASCO) which was a private company owned by the Baharoon brothers. It operated a network of flight routes throughout Africa and the Middle East, with its hub at Aden Airport, the former Khormaksar Air Force Base. Its head office was in the Alyemda Building in Khormaksar, Aden.

== History ==
Alyemda was founded as the national airline of the People's Democratic Republic of Yemen by presidential decree on 11 March 1971. At March 1972, the workforce was 600. At this time the fleet consisted of three DC-3s, a single DC-6A/B and three DC-6Bs. By the mid-1970s Alyemda acquired a fleet of Boeing 707/720 jetliners. Three brand new Dash 7s turboprop liners were acquired in 1979. On 9 May 1982, one of these aircraft crashed into the sea on approach to Aden Airport. In 1983 Alyemda got its first brand new Boeing 737-200ADV which was mostly used for domestic and regional flights, also the Tupolev Tu-154 joined the fleet by the mid-1980s and later the Airbus A310-304 jetliner in 1993. Following the unification of Yemen in 1990, the airline was renamed first Alyemda Air Yemen in 1992, and later in 1995 Alyemen Airlines of Yemen.

By March 1990, Alyemda had 1,207 employees; at that time, the airline operated scheduled passenger and cargo services that radiated from Aden to Abu Dhabi, Addis Ababa, Al Ghaydah, Ataq, Beihan, Bombay, Budapest, Cairo, Damascus, Djibouti, Doha, Jeddah, Kuwait, Larnaca, Mogadishu, Mukeiras, Riyan, Sanaa, Seiyun and Sharjah. By April 1995, Abdulla Ali Abdulla held Alyemda's chairman position, and the airline had 1,258 employees. The fleet consisted of one Airbus A310-300, one Antonov An-26, one Antonov An-12, two Boeing 737-200s, one leased Boeing 727, two Boeing 707-300Cs and one Douglas DC-6, and the network included services to Abu Dhabi, Al Ghaydah, Ataq, Bombay, Cairo, Djibouti, Doha, Riyan/Mukalla, Sanaa and Sharjah.

On 11 February 1996, Alyemda merged into Yemenia to create a single national airline for Yemen.

== Fleet details ==
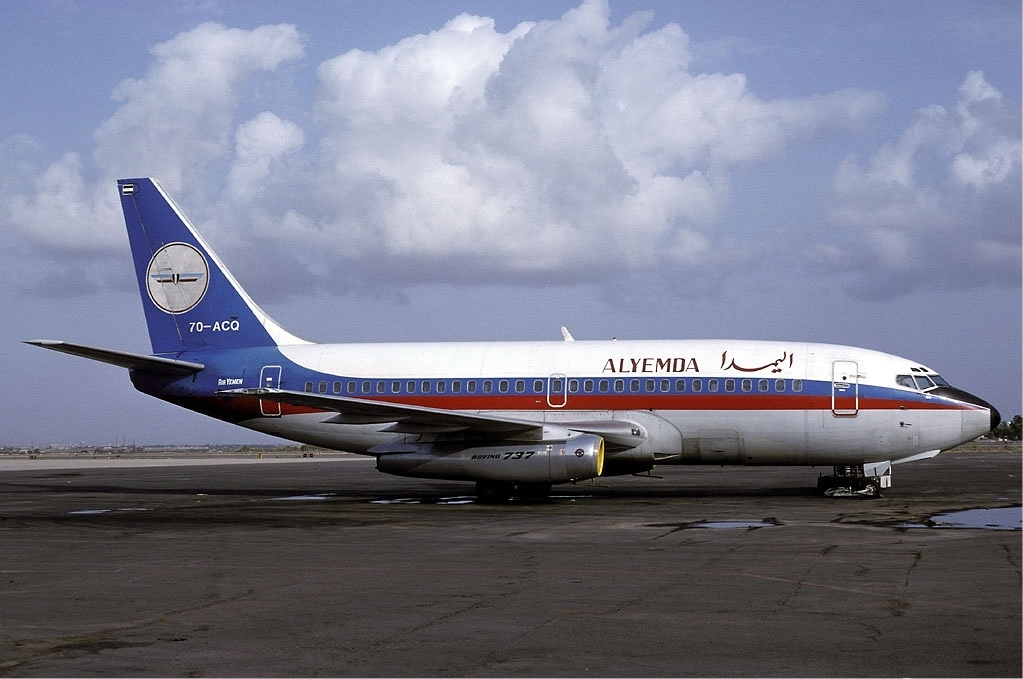
An Alyemda Boeing 737-200 at Aden International Airport in 1992.

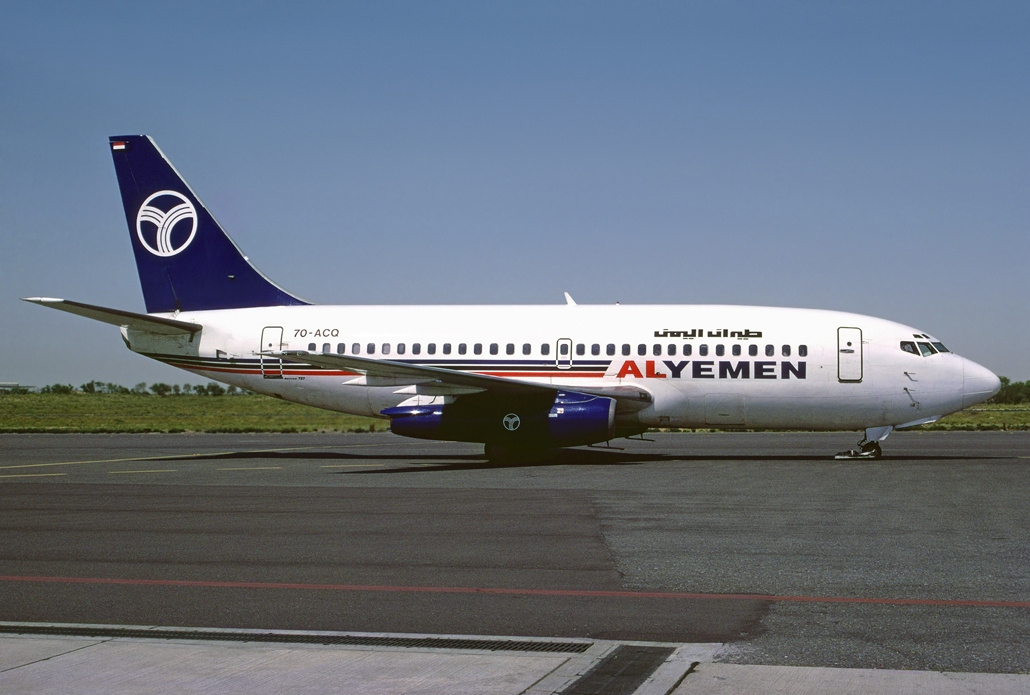
The same aircraft at Sharjah International Airport in 1995, featuring the Alyemen livery.

Evolution of the carrier's livery in a Boeing 737-200.

Over the years of its existence, Alyemda operated the following aircraft types:

- Airbus A310-304
- Boeing 707
- Boeing 720
- Boeing 737-200ADV
- de Havilland Canada Dash 7
- Douglas C-47 Skytrain
- Douglas DC-3
- Douglas DC-6
- Tupolev Tu-154

== Accidents and incidents ==
- On 22 August 1972, an Alyemda Douglas DC-6 was hijacked by three passengers during a scheduled flight from Beirut, Lebanon, to Cairo, Egypt, in an act of demonstration for a unification of North Yemen and South Yemen. The pilots were forced to have a fuel stop at Nicosia, Cyprus, and continued to Benghazi, Libya, where the perpetrators surrendered to local police forces, without having injured anyone of the remaining 49 passengers and six crew.
- On 16 or 17 September 1975, an Alyemda Douglas DC-3 (registered 7O-ABF) was damaged beyond economic repair in a landing accident at Beihan Airport, following a scheduled flight from Aden.
- On 1 March 1977, an Alyemda Douglas C-47 (registered 7O-ABF) crashed into the Red Sea shortly after take-off from Aden International Airport. All 16 passengers and three crew members that had been on the scheduled domestic flight were killed.
- On 26 January 1982, five months before the outbreak of the First Lebanon War, an Alyemda Boeing 707-300 cargo aircraft (registered 7O-ACJ) carrying weapons from Libya to Lebanon was attacked by an unidentified fighter aircraft upon approaching Damascus International Airport. The pilots managed to safely land the plane, even though it had received substantial damage.
- On 9 May 1982, an Alyemda de Havilland Canada Dash 7 (registered 7O-ACK) crashed into the sea upon approaching Aden International Airport following a scheduled flight from Mukalla. Of the 45 passengers, 21 lost their lives, as well as two out of the four crew members, making it the worst accident in the history of the airline.
- On 20 January 1983, three persons hijacked an Alyemda Boeing 707 during a flight from Aden to Kuwait City, and forced the pilots to divert to Djibouti City. At Djibouti Airport, the perpetrators surrendered.
- On 15 August 1985, an Alyemda Boeing 707 (registered 7O-ACO) carrying 65 passengers and 8 crew went temporarily out of control following an autopilot malfunction caused by water spilled on the panel and subsequent pilot error. The aircraft heavily pitched up and down, causing the death of two passengers and one flight attendant. When the pilots managed to resolve the situation, they carried out an emergency landing at Aden Airport, from where the flight had departed.
- On 27 August 1993, an Alyemda Boeing 737-200 was hijacked during a scheduled domestic flight from Mukalla to Al Ghaydah by an armed person who demanded to be taken to either Kuwait or Oman. The pilots continued to Al Ghaydah Airport instead, where all passengers could leave, allowing police forces to storm the plane and arrest the perpetrator.
- On 14 September 1994, a hijacking attempt occurred on board another Alyemda Boeing 737-200 on a flight from Aden to Sana'a.
