= Mukeiras Airport =

Airport in Yemen

Mukeiras Airport Mukayras Airport
- IATA: UKR; ICAO: OYMS

Summary
- Airport type: Public
- Serves: Mukayras
- Elevation AMSL: 6,700 ft / 2,042 m
- Coordinates: 13°56′10″N 45°39′20″E

Map
- Location of the airport in Yemen

Runways
Direction	Length		Surface
Direction	ft	m	Surface
08/26	5,320	1,620	Dirt
- Source: Google Maps

Mukeiras (IATA: UKR, ICAO: OYMS) is an airport serving the town of Mukayras in Yemen.

== See also ==
- List of airports in Yemen
- Transport in Yemen
