= Yemen Airlines =

Yemen Airlines may refer to the following airlines:

- Yemenia, the flag carrier airline of Yemen
- Alyemda, the national airline of South Yemen
