= Brothers Air Services =

Airline in Yemen (1967–1971)

IATA	ICAO	Call sign
—	—	BASCO
- Founded: 1967
- Ceased operations: 1971 (nationalised into Alyemda)
- Hubs: Aden International Airport
- Alliance: none
- Fleet size: 2
- Parent company: South Yemen Government
- Headquarters: Aden, South Yemen

Brothers Air Services, internationally known as BASCO, was established in 1967 by Sayid Zein A. Baharoon following the end of British colonialism in Aden. It operated in the People's Democratic Republic of Yemen (PDRY) from 1967 to 1971 before its assets were nationalized and incorporated into the newly created Alyemda Airline.

According to Erich Wiedemann, BASCO flew to Addis Ababa and Assab in neighboring Ethiopia.

According to Olivier Roy, BASCO operated weekly flights between Aden and Brussels.

== Fleet details ==
The BASCO company owned two DC3 aircraft; VR-ABE, Construction No:16583/33331 and VR-ABF Construction No:13475.
