= List of airlines of Yemen =

This is a list of airlines currently operating in Yemen.

== Scheduled airlines ==
Airline	Image	IATA	ICAO	Callsign	Commenced operations	Notes
Felix Airways		FO	FXX	FELIX	2008	
Yemenia		IY	IYE	YEMENI	1961	

== See also ==
- List of airlines
- List of defunct airlines of Yemen
- List of defunct airlines of Asia
