= Al Bayda' Airport (Yemen) =

Airport in Yemen

- IATA: BYD; ICAO: OYBI

Summary
- Airport type: Public
- Serves: Al Bayda'
- Elevation AMSL: 6,120 ft / 1,865 m
- Coordinates: 14°06′20″N 45°26′25″E

Map
- Location of the airport in Yemen

Runways
Direction	Length		Surface
Direction	ft	m	Surface
03/21	5,560	1,695	Dirt
- Source: Google Maps

Al Bayda' (IATA: BYD, ICAO: OYBI) is an airstrip serving the town of Al Bayda' in the Governorate of Al-Bayda in Yemen.

== See also ==
- List of airports in Yemen
- Transport in Yemen
