= Marib Airport =

Airport in Yemen

Marib Airport مطار مأرب
- IATA: MYN; ICAO: OYMB

Summary
- Airport type: Public
- Serves: Ma'rib
- Elevation AMSL: 3,300 ft / 1,006 m
- Coordinates: 15°28′10″N 45°19′40″E

Map
- Location of the airport in Yemen

Runways
Direction	Length		Surface
Direction	ft	m	Surface
17/35	8,135	2,480	Dirt
- Source: Google Maps

Marib (IATA: MYN, ICAO: OYMB) is a civilian airport which was designated for construction in 2018 to serve the town of Ma'rib in Yemen. Its construction was suspended indefinitely for political reasons after being awarded to a contracting company. The construction of the airport has reportedly restarted as of 4 October 2023, after Governor Sultan Al Aradah laid the new foundation stone. It is to be built with Saudi funding.

== See also ==
- List of airports in Yemen
- Transport in Yemen
