= Sye =

Sye or SYE may refer to:

- Erromangan, a language spoken in Vanuatu
- Saadah Airport, Yemen, by IATA code
- Sye (2004 film), a 2004 Telugu film
- Sye (2005 film), a 2005 Kannada film
- South Yemen
