= Abs Airport =

Airport in Yemen

- IATA: EAB; ICAO: OYAB

Summary
- Airport type: Public
- Serves: Abs
- Elevation AMSL: 651 ft / 198 m
- Coordinates: 16°00′40″N 43°10′40″E

Map
- Location of the airport in Yemen

Runways
Direction	Length		Surface
Direction	ft	m	Surface
09/27	8,250	2,515	Dirt
- Source: Google Maps

Abs (IATA: EAB, ICAO: OYAB) is an airport serving the town of Abs in Yemen.

On 11 January 2024, the Royal Air Force struck an airfield at the airport, which the U.S. and UK said was a launch site for cruise missiles and drones launched by the Houthis against merchant and naval vessels during the Red Sea crisis.

== See also ==
- List of airports in Yemen
- Transport in Yemen
