= Kamaran Airport =

Airport in Yemen

- IATA: KAM; ICAO: OYKM

Summary
- Airport type: Public
- Serves: Kamaran
- Elevation AMSL: 51 ft / 16 m
- Coordinates: 15°21′40″N 42°36′40″E

Map
- Location of the airport in Yemen

Runways
Direction	Length		Surface
Direction	ft	m	Surface
13/31	6,170	1,880	Dirt
- Source: Google Maps

Kamaran (IATA: KAM , ICAO: OYKM) is an airport serving the village of Kamaran on Kamaran Island in Yemen.

A poorly defined north–south runway exists, with a reported length of 1,800 metres (5,906 ft). The runway is not easily seen, but does have markings.

== See also ==
- List of airports in Yemen
- Transport in Yemen
