= 834 Naval Air Squadron =

Inactive flying squadron of the Royal Navy's Fleet Air Arm

- Squadron badge
- Active: 1941-1944
- Disbanded: 6 December 1944
- Country: United Kingdom; New Zealand
- Branch: Royal Navy
- Type: Torpedo Bomber Reconnaissance squadron
- Role: Carrier-based: anti-submarine warfare (ASW); anti-surface warfare (ASuW); Maritime patrol; Combat air patrol (CAP)
- Part of: Fleet Air Arm
- Home station: See Naval air stations section for full list.
- Mottos: Una feriendo delmus (Latin for 'By striking together we destroy')
- Engagements: World War II: European theatre of World War II; Operation Avalanche; Pacific War
- Battle honours: Salerno 1943; East Indies 1944

Commanders
- Notable commanders: Lieutenant Commander(A) E. Dixon-Child, RN

Insignia
- Squadron Badge Description: Blue, in base water barry wavy of four white and blue two gauntlets conjoined in bend winged gold the upper grasping a battleaxe blade uppermost and the lower grasping a trident head downwards also gold (1944)
- Identification Markings: single letters (Swordfish); 4A+ (Swordfish September 1943); single letters (Seafire)

Aircraft flown
- Bomber: Fairey Swordfish
- Fighter: Supermarine Seafire; Grumman Wildcat

834 Naval Air Squadron (834 NAS), also called 834 Squadron, was a Fleet Air Arm (FAA) naval air squadron of the United Kingdom’s Royal Navy (RN). It was last active during World War II, primarily utilising the Fairey Swordfish torpedo bomber throughout the conflict. In addition to this aircraft, the squadron also operated the Supermarine Seafire in 1943 and the Grumman Wildcat in 1944, both fighter aircraft and both of which were employed for combat air patrol (CAP) missions.

The squadron was formed in Jamaica in December 1941 as a torpedo bomber squadron equipped with Fairey Swordfish aircraft. The squadron was embarked on HMS Archer from March 1942 to February 1943 and involved in convoy escorted duties in the Atlantic and Mediterranean. 834 NAS then joined No. 19 Group RAF, RAF Coastal Command, for duties in the English Channel. In June a flight of Supermarine Seafires was formed and the next month the squadron was embarked on HMS Hunter. The squadron took part in the Salerno landings in September, before being transferred to HMS Battler (D18) to provide convoy escort duties in the Indian Ocean. 834 NAS received a further flight of 6 Grumman Wildcat Vs in April 1944 and the Seafire flight was disbanded in July. The squadron returned to the UK in November 1944 and was disbanded in December.

834 NAS contained a number of New Zealanders seconded from the Royal New Zealand Naval Volunteer Reserve who served as pilots and, at one point, the squadron commander. In 1994 the designation of 834 Squadron was transferred from the Royal Navy to the Royal New Zealand Navy.

The Fleet Air Arm Museum contains a surviving Fairey Swordfish (HS618) which was operated by 834 NAS from May 1943 until it was damaged in the hangar of HMS Hunter during bad weather. It is currently painted in the colours of 813 Naval Air Squadron.

== History ==
=== Torpedo, bomber, reconnaissance squadron (1941-1944) ===
On 12 November 1941, members of 834 Naval Air Squadron gathered at RNAS Eastleigh (HMS Raven), Hampshire, for passage to Jamaica. The squadron was then officially established at the Royal Naval Air Station at Palisadoes, commissioned HMS Buzzard, in Kingston, Jamaica, on 10 December 1941, under the command of Lieutenant Commander L.C.B. Ashburner, RN, designated as a torpedo, bomber, reconnaissance (TBR) squadron and equipped with four Fairey Swordfish I biplane torpedo bombers.

In March 1942, these flew to Charleston, South Carolina, passing through Cuba, Miami, and Jacksonville, where they joined the Long Island-class escort carrier, HMS Archer, the inaugural escort carrier constructed in the United States. On 18 March, she departed from Charleston to accompany a rapid convoy to West Africa. Serving as an escort for convoy AS 2, she made her way to Freetown, Sierra Leone, and ultimately arrived in Cape Town, South Africa, on 24 May. Upon her return, HMS Archer entered the harbor in New York on 15 July, where 834 Naval Air Squadron was disembarked to the RN Air Section located at USNAS Floyd Bennett Field in Brooklyn.

The squadron was to provide anti-submarine cover for a convoy to the UK, with the introduction of Fairey Swordfish Il, the previous aircraft being phased out and then re-boarded HMS Archer, which subsequently joined convoy UGF 2. This convoy departed from Hampton Roads on 2 November 1942, crossing the Atlantic and reaching Gibraltar to await convoy MKF 3. Upon arriving in the United Kingdom on 3 December, 834 Naval Air Squadron proceeded to RNAS Crail (HMS Jackdaw), Fife, Scotland.

In January 1943, the fleet was expanded to include six aircraft while at RNAS Crail, before transitioning to RAF Coastal Command at RAF Exeter in Devon, where they were under 19 Group, focusing on night patrols and assaults on shipping in the English Channel. In April 1943, the squadron relocated to RNAS Machrihanish (HMS Landrail) in Argyll and Bute, where it received an additional three Fairey Swordfish aircraft. Subsequently, the squadron moved to RNAS Eglinton (HMS Gannet) in County Londonderry, Northern Ireland, as well as RAF Ballykelly in the same county. The squadron returned to RNAS Machrihanish in June 1943, at which point it incorporated six Supermarine Seafire L Mk.IIc fighter aircraft to establish a dedicated fighter flight.

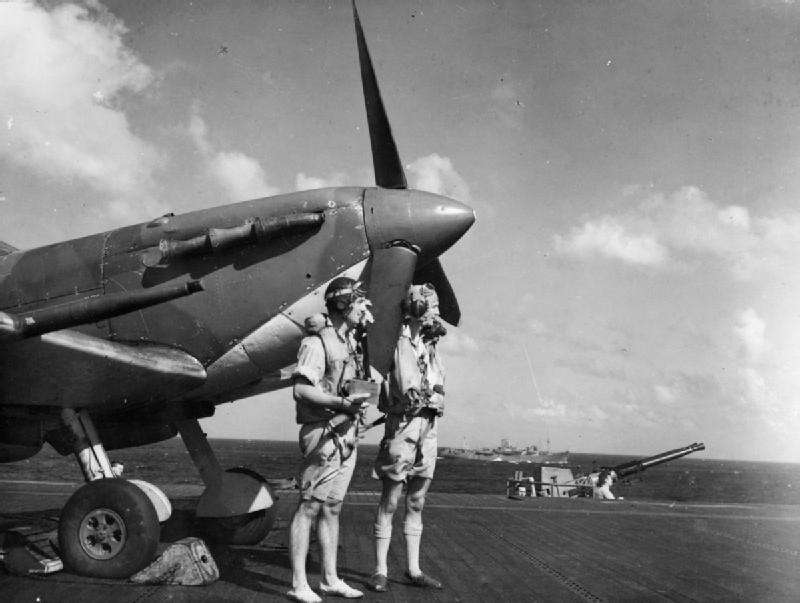
Pilots of 834 Squadron and a Supermarine Seafire on the flight deck of HMS Battler

In July, three Fairey Swordfish were assigned to 836 Naval Air Squadron as the squadron boarded the Attacker-class escort carrier, HMS Hunter, for deployment to Gibraltar. Upon arrival, as part of convoy WS 33, the Fairey Swordfish contingent disembarked to function as 834Z Naval Air Squadron. During the landings at Salerno in September, the Supermarine Seafire aircraft collaborated with 899 Naval Air Squadron to deliver air defense. Subsequently, the entire squadron moved to sister ship, HMS Battler, taking with them nine Fairey Swordfish and six Supermarine Seafire aircraft, and set sail as part of Fast Convoy KMF 24.

The carrier made its way to the Aden Protectorate, where 834 Naval Air Squadron conducted anti-submarine patrols from RAF Riyan during October. Subsequently, they re-embarked in the carrier for Bombay, India, to assist convoys in the Indian Ocean. In February 1944, an additional three aircraft were incorporated into their operations, and on 12 March, the German tanker Brake was discovered in the vicinity of Mauritius and subsequently sunk by the destroyer, HMS Roebuck.

A U-boat might have sustained damage from a rocket projectile strike. In April 1944, an additional fighter flight consisting of six Grumman Wildcat Mk V fighter aircraft was established at RNAS Puttalam (HMS Rajaliya), Ceylon, while the remainder of the squadron remained on land in South Africa at RN Air Section Durban (HMS Kongoni), a lodger unit at South African Air Force Station Stamford Hill. Later, the primary contingent of the squadron, along with the newly formed fighter flight, reassembled in Ceylon in July 1944, coinciding with the withdrawal of the Supermarine Seafire aircraft.

The squadron ensured trade security in the Indian Ocean until its disembarkation in September. In November, it relinquished its aircraft and boarded HMS Battler for the journey home, subsequently transferring to the Ruler-class escort carrier, HMS Thane, at Port Said, where it officially disbanded upon arrival in the UK on 6 December. Efforts to reestablish the squadron as a special operations unit at RNAS Culdrose (HMS Seahawk), Somerset, in 1994 did not come to fruition.

== Aircraft operated ==
The squadron has operated a number of different aircraft types:

Aircraft operated by 834 Naval Air Squadron
Aircraft	Variant	Type	From	To
Fairey Swordfish	I	torpedo bomber	December 1941	April 1943
Fairey Swordfish	II	torpedo bomber	September 1942	November 1944
Supermarine Seafire	L Mk.IIc	fighter aircraft	June 1943	July 1944
Grumman Wildcat	Mk V	fighter aircraft	April 1944	November 1944

== Battle honours ==
The Battle Honours awarded to 834 Naval Air Squadron are:

- Salerno 1943
- East Indies 1944

== Naval air stations ==
834 Naval Air Squadron operated from a number of naval air stations of the Royal Navy, and Royal Air Force stations in the UK and overseas, and also a number of Royal Navy escort carriers and other airbases overseas:

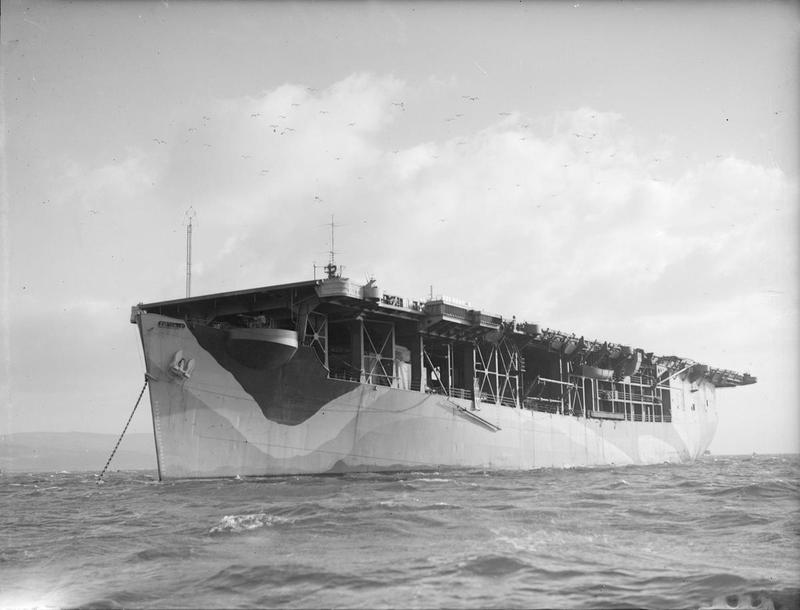
HMS Archer

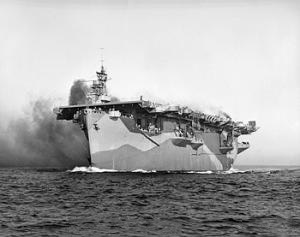
HMS Battler

- Royal Naval Air Station Palisadoes (HMS Buzzard), Jamaica, (10 December 1941 - 10 March 1942)
- transit (10 - 18 March 1942)
- Charleston Air Force Base, South Carolina, (18 -19 March 1942)
- HMS Archer (19 March - 16 July 1942)
- RN Air Section Floyd Bennett Field, Brooklyn, New York, (16 July - 31 October 1942)
- HMS Archer (31 October - 2 December 1942)
- Royal Naval Air Station Crail (HMS Jackdaw), Fife, (2 December 1942 - 9 February 1943)
- Royal Air Force Exeter (19 Gp), Devon, (9 February - 21 April 1943)
  - Royal Air Force Harrowbeer, Devon, (Detachment three aircraft 14 - 15 April 1943)
- Royal Naval Air Station Machrihanish (HMS Landrail), Argyll and Bute, (21 April - 30 May 1943)
- Royal Naval Air Station Eglinton (HMS Gannet), County Londonderry, (30 May - 15 June 1943)
- Royal Air Force Ballykelly, County Londonderry, (30 May - 15 June 1943)
- Royal Naval Air Station Machrihanish (HMS Landrail), Argyll and Bute, (15 June - 8 July 1943)
- HMS Hunter (8 July - 15 September 1943)
  - Royal Naval Air Station Machrihanish (HMS Landrail), Argyll and Bute, (Detachment three aircraft 7 - 13 August 1943)
  - RN Air Section Gibraltar, Gibraltar, ('Z' Flight) (25 August - 15 September 1943)
  - Paestum Airfield, Italy, (Detachment 12 - 14 September 1943)
- HMS Battler (15 September - 15 October 1943)
- Royal Air Force Rbiyan (Lurkulla), Yemen, (5 - 19 October 1943)
- HMS Battler (19 October 1943 - 4 February 1944)
- Royal Naval Air Station Katukurunda (HMS Ukussa), Ceylon, (25 July - 11 August 1944)
- HMS Battler (11 August - 19 September 1944)
- Royal Naval Air Station Coimbatore (HMS Garuda), India, (19 - 27 September 1944)
- RN Air Section Cochin, India, (27 - 28 September 1944)
- HMS Battler (28 September - 7 October 1944)
- Royal Naval Air Station Trincomalee (HMS Bambara), Ceylon, (7 - 18 October 1944)
- Royal Air Force Vavuniya, Ceylon, (18 October - 7 November 1944)
- HMS Battler (crews) (7 - 22 November 1944)
- HMS Thane (crews) (22 November - 6 December 1944)
- disbanded UK - (6 December 1944)

== Commanding officers ==
List of commanding officers of 834 Naval Air Squadron:

- Lieutenant Commander L.C.B. Ashburner, RN, from 12 November 1941 (KiFA 19 November 1941)
- Lieutenant L.G. Wilson, RN, from 20 November 1941
- Lieutenant Commander(A) E. Dixon-Child, RN, from 21 January 1943
- Lieutenant Commander(A) D.W. Phillips, DSC, RN, from 12 August 1944
- disbanded - 6 December 1944

Note: Abbreviation (A) signifies Air Branch of the RN or RNVR.
