= BHN (disambiguation) =

BHN or Brinell Hardness Number is a measure of hardness in materials science

BHN may also refer to:

- Bahrain, sovereign state in the Persian Gulf
- Bright House Networks, former American telecom company
- the IATA airport code for Beihan Airport, Yemen
- the ISO 639-3 language code for Bohtan Neo-Aramaic
