= Al Ghaydah district =

Al Ghaydah district مديرية الغيضة
- District
- Location in Yemen
- Coordinates: 16°05′N 52°05′E
- Country: Yemen
- Governorate: Al Mahrah
- Seat: Al Ghaydah

Population (2003)
  - Total: 27,404
- Time zone: UTC+3 (Yemen Standard Time)

Al Ghaydah district (Arabic: مديرية الغيضة) is a district of the Al Mahrah Governorate, Yemen. As of 2003, the district had a population of 27,404 inhabitants.

Al Ghaydah is the biggest city in the district, as well as the capital of Al Mahrah Governorate.
