= Albuq Airport =

Airport in Yemen

Albuq Airport Al Bough
- IATA: BUK; ICAO: OYBQ

Summary
- Airport type: Public
- Serves: Albuq
- Elevation AMSL: 3,800 ft / 1,158 m
- Coordinates: 17°21′00″N 44°37′30″E

Map
- Location of the airport in Yemen

Runways
Direction	Length		Surface
Direction	ft	m	Surface
06/24	8,185	2,495	Dirt
- Source: Google Maps

Albuq' (IATA: BUK, ICAO: OYBQ) is an airstrip serving the village of Albuq in Yemen.

The runway is subject to obstruction by drifting sand.

== See also ==
- List of airports in Yemen
- Transport in Yemen
