= 1958 Yemen Airlines Douglas C-47 Skytrain crash =

1958 aviation accident

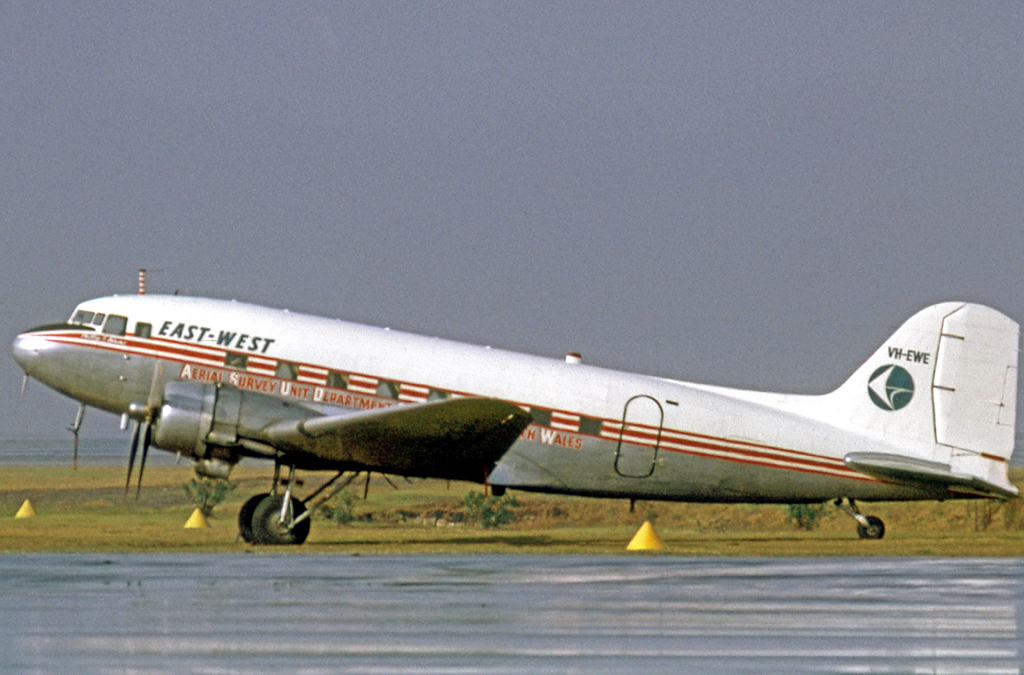
- A similar Douglas C-47

Accident
- Date: 3 November 1958
- Summary: Controlled flight into terrain
- Site: Near Poggiodomo, Italy

Aircraft
- Aircraft type: Douglas C-47 Skytrain
- Operator: Yemen Airlines
- Registration: YE-AAB
- Flight origin: Rome Ciampino Airport, Rome, Italy
- Destination: Dojno Polje Airport, Belgrade, Yugoslavia
- Occupants: 8
- Passengers: 4
- Crew: 4
- Fatalities: 8
- Survivors: 0

On 3 November 1958, a Douglas C-47 Skytrain operated by Yemen Airlines crashed near Poggiodomo, Italy, killing all eight occupants on board, including the Under Secretary of Foreign Affairs of Yemen. The investigation determined the cause to be controlled flight into terrain by pilot error.

== Aircraft and crew ==
The aircraft involved in the accident was a Douglas C-47 Skytrain registered YE-AAB. It was manufactured in 1942 with the manufacturer serial number 4345.

The crew members consisted of pilot-in-command Mohamed Sehjani, co-pilot Furlan, radio operator Mohamed Suber, and flight attendant Tankosic. Sehjani and Suber were Yemeni and Furlan and Tankosic were Yugoslavian. Another source reported that the pilot-in-command was Furlan and the second-pilot was named Sahamai. Furlan had a total of 3,165 flying hours, of which 2,125 had been on DC-3 type aircraft.

== Accident ==
The passengers were Victor Jonescu, Giorgi Trenteo, Mohamed Murala, and Mohamed Sajet Ashani. Jonescu and Trenteo were Romanian dentists, Murala was a Yemeni businessman, and Ashani was the Under Secretary of Foreign Affairs of Yemen.

The flight departed Ciampino Airport at 16:45 GMT on an IFR flight plan and was to proceed to Dojno Polje Airport via Viterbo, Pescara, and Split. At 17:29 ATC notified the aircraft that it was to the left of Viterbo. At 17:36 the crew radioed that they were over Viterbo and the plane was to arrive at Pescara at 18:17. At 17:38 the aircraft was cleared to climb from 8,500 ft (2,600 m) to 13,000 ft (4,000 m) and asked to transfer from VHF to HF. This was the last communication with the flight, and at approximately 18:00 the C-47 crashed on the western slopes of Monte Porretta, near Roccatamburo, Poggiodomo, at a height of 2,690 ft (820 m). Before the impact, some witnesses reported seeing the plane on fire and rapidly losing altitude. All occupants on board were killed and the plane was destroyed.

The local Carabinieri was contacted and was responsible for the recovery of the bodies. The recovery of the bodies was hindered by heavy rain in the area the morning after. The Yemeni and Yugoslavian embassies sent representatives to Poggiodomo after the accident.

== Investigation ==
All navigations aids were functioning properly at the time of the accident. The crew was also informed of the weather conditions. All instruments, navigation aids, and radio equipment were operational up until the impact. The investigation concluded that the pilot may have descended to 2,690 ft (820 m) to, either, rest after a lengthy instrument flight, make a visual position check, or eliminate icing. He could have also thought that the plane had crossed the mountains. The investigation reached the conclusions that the crew were inadequately trained and preparation for the flight was inadequate and, that the accident was caused by faulty conduct of flight.
