= Aden Airways =

Airline of Aden (1949–1967)

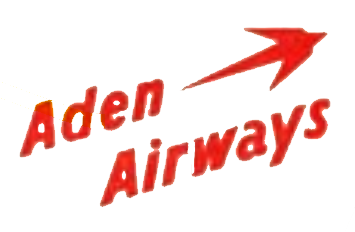
- Aden Airways Logo
- Founded: 7 March 1949
- Commenced operations: 1 October 1949
- Ceased operations: 30 June 1967
- Operating bases: Aden Airport
- Parent company: BOAC
- Headquarters: Khormaksar, Aden

Aden Airways was a subsidiary of British Overseas Airways Corporation (BOAC) based in Aden. It was in operation from 1949 to 1967.

== History ==
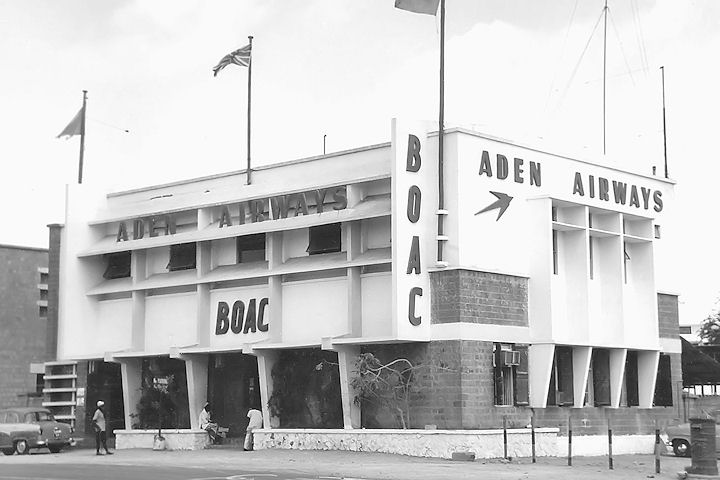
The Aden Airways terminal building at Khormaksar. Photo taken c. 1960.

In 1947, a proposal to form an airline in Aden using a pair of Bristol Wayfarers did not materialize. An engineering base was established by BOAC in Asmara, Eritrea, in January 1948 as part of BOACs No.5 Line, which was centered on Aden and served Cairo, Nairobi and the Red Sea area. On 7 March 1949, Aden Airways Ltd was established as a wholly owned subsidiary of BOAC. A fleet of six BOAC Douglas DC-3 aircraft were based at Aden and these were taken over by Aden Airways. Operations commenced on 1 October 1949 with the aircraft operating under their United Kingdom (G-) registrations. On 1 February 1950, the aircraft were placed on the Aden (VR-A) register.

On 31 March 1950, share capital of Rs. 800,580 (£60,043) was issued. BOAC owned all the shares. The ownership of the shares passed to Associated British Airlines (Middle East) Ltd in 1955 and B.O.A.C. Associated Companies in 1957.

Aden Airways experienced a seasonal increase in passenger numbers due to the pilgrimage to Mecca. Extra aircraft were leased to cover these flights, notably Avro Yorks from Skyways in 1954 and 1955. On 28 February 1960, Aden Airways took delivery of their first Canadair C-4 Argonaut. A May 1960 order for Avro 748s was later cancelled. From 1 January 1962, Aden Airways entered into an agreement with East African Airways Corporation to pool services on the Aden – Nairobi route. In September 1963, the first turboprop Vickers Viscounts entered service. In 1967, the political situation in Aden was deteriorating and Aden Airways therefore ceased operations on 30 June 1967.

== Fleet ==
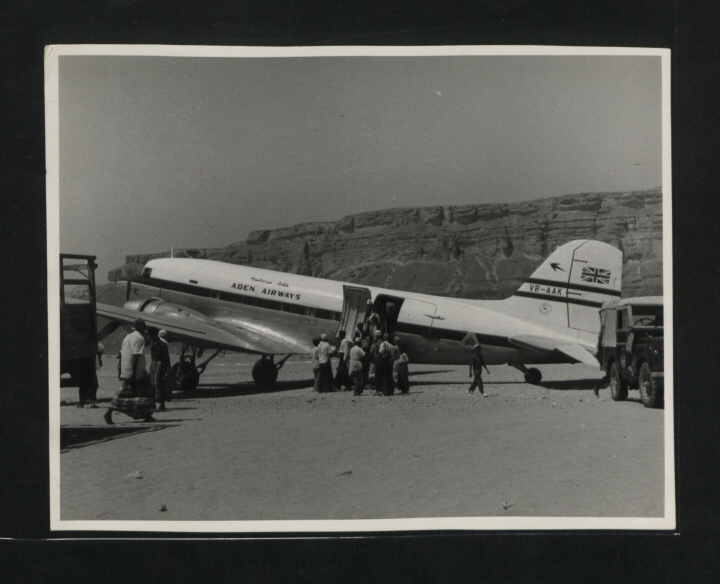
Aden Airways Aircraft

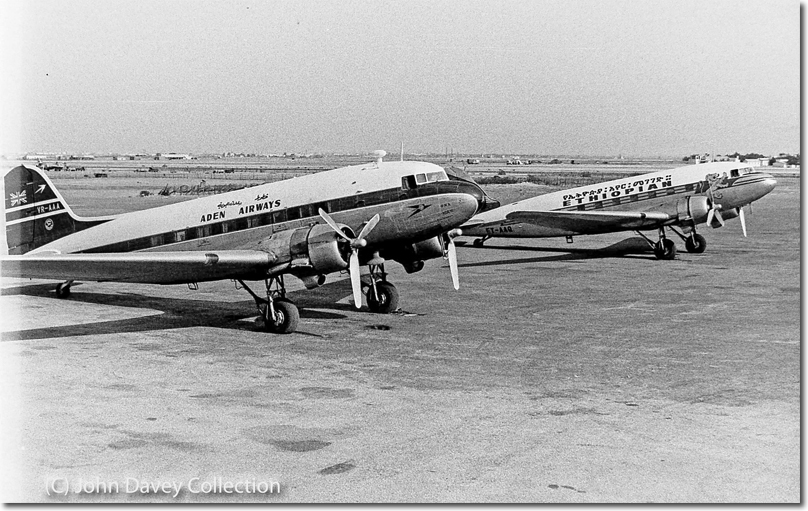
DC3 of Aden Airways waiting next to an Ethiopian Airlines DC3 at Khormaksar in 1962/3

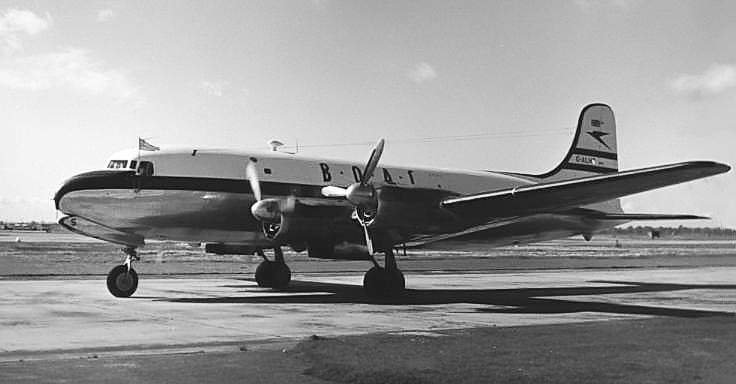
G-ALHS in BOAC livery

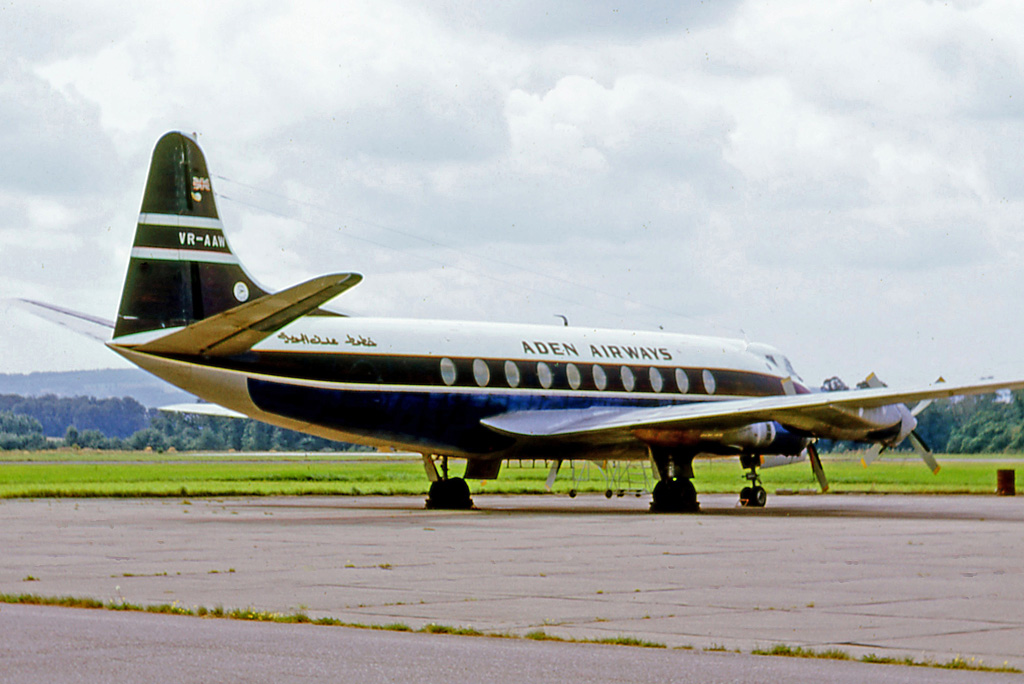
Vickers Viscount 760 of Aden Airways, operated from 1963 until 1967

=== Douglas DC-3 ===
- Twelve different Douglas DC-3s (all were former military Dakotas or C-47s) were operated by the airline from 1950 until it closed in 1967.

=== Canadair C-4 Argonaut ===
Three Argonauts were acquired from BOAC in 1960 and one from East African Airways. Another Argonaut was leased from Derby Airways.

The three former BOAC aircraft were scrapped after serving with Aden Airways and the former East African Airways went to the United Kingdom in May 1964.

=== Vickers Viscount ===
- Two aircraft delivered to Aden Airways in September 1963. One aircraft was placed in storage in April 1967 and the other was destroyed by fire on 21 July 1967 after a bomb exploded while the aircraft was in quarantine. The bomb had been placed by National Liberation Front guerillas. One aircraft was also leased from Central African Airways.

=== Avro York ===
- A number of Avro Yorks were leased from Skyways in 1954 and 1955.

=== Avro 748 ===
- Two Avro 748s were ordered in May 1960. The order was cancelled in May 1962.

== Accidents and incidents ==
- In October 1952, Douglas DC-3 VR-AAE was severely damaged in an accident when it landed on a road near Assouan, Egypt and hit a tree stump. The damaged aircraft was dismantled and transported to Heliopolis by barge and thence to Cairo, where it was repaired despite being declared a write-off and Aden Airways receiving £30,000 in insurance money.
- On 12 April 1964, Douglas DC-3 VR-AAM was written off at Hargeisa, Somalia with the loss of 15 lives.
- On 26 March 1965, Douglas DC-3 VR-AAA was damaged beyond economic repair after it was groundlooped following a downwind landing at Hadibo Airport, Socotra, South Yemen.
- On 22 November 1966, Douglas DC-3 VR-AAN crashed at Wadi Rabtah after a bomb on board exploded. The aircraft was on a flight from Mayfa'ah Airport to Aden International Airport. Thirty people were killed, amongst them Amir Mohammed bin Said, the Prime Minister of Wahidi. The bomb had been planted by his son, Ali.
- On 30 June 1967, Vickers Viscount VR-AAV was damaged beyond economic repair at Aden International Airport when a bomb on board exploded. The aircraft was in quarantine at the time after an engine change.

== See also ==
- List of defunct airlines of Yemen
