= Sultan Palace Hotel =

Hotel in Sana'a, Yemen

- Interactive map of the Sultan Palace Hotel area

General information
- Location: Sana'a, Yemen
- Coordinates: 15.3524°N 44.2084°E

Sultan Palace Hotel is a hotel in Sana'a, Yemen. Founded in 1987, the hotel is located in one of the oldest buildings in the old part of Sana'a city and is nearly 400 years old.
