= Seiyun Airport =

Airport in Yemen

Seiyun Hadhramaut Airport مطار سيئون حضرموت
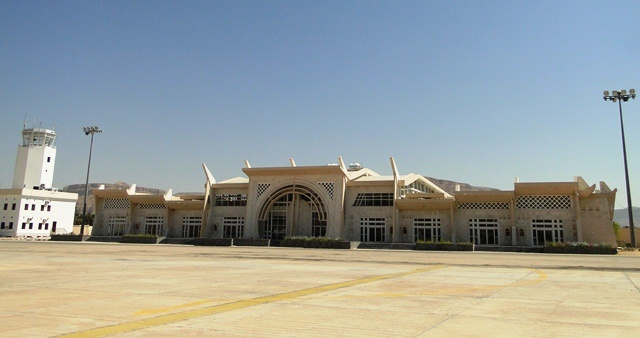
- IATA: GXF; ICAO: OYSY

Summary
- Airport type: Public
- Operator: Government of Yemen
- Serves: Seiyun
- Location: Seiyun, Yemen
- Hub for: Yemenia
- Elevation AMSL: 639 m (2,096 ft)
- Coordinates: 15°57′58″N 048°47′17″E

Map
- Location of airport in Yemen

Runways
Direction	Length		Surface
Direction	m	ft	Surface
07/25	3,000	9,843	Asphalt

Seiyun Hadhramaut Airport (IATA: GXF, ICAO: OYSY) is an airport in Seiyun, Hadhramaut, Yemen.

== History ==
In 2016, all of Yemenia's flights passed through Bisha Domestic Airport for security checks. However, Yemenia did not have the traffic rights to transport passengers solely to/from Bisha. Until November 2017, it was the sole operating airport in Yemen, due to the air blockade of Sanaa International Airport and political turmoil in Aden International Airport. As of September 2022, the airport's sole user and national flag carrier Yemenia operates flights to Aden, Cairo, and Jeddah.

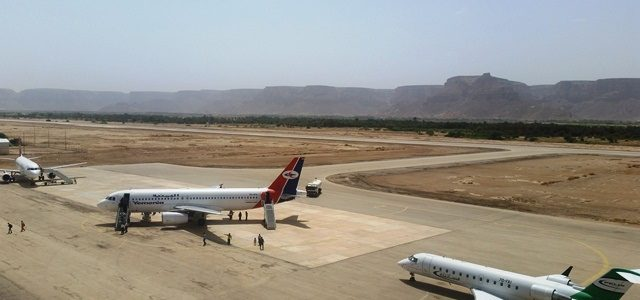
Planes at the airport

== Airlines and destinations ==
Airlines	Destinations
Yemenia	Aden, Cairo, Jeddah

== See also ==
- List of airports in Yemen
