= Erich Wiedemann =

German journalist and editor

Erich Wiedemann (born 1942) is a German journalist and editor (at the Hamburg desk) for the weekly news magazine Der Spiegel, where he began as a reporter in 1988. For the FDP, he was also a member of the city council of Jesteburg and a representative for the Harburg district.

Wiedemann has written on German minorities in other European countries and on socio-economic developments in post-World War II Germany. A Spiegel article on the Netherlands from 1994, in which Wiedemann argued that the country had lost its reputation for tolerance and suffered an identity crisis, caused a stir among the Dutch: Wiedemann reiterated a number of cliches about the Dutch, leading to a backlash from Dutch newspaper writers and critics. The accompanying image by Sebastian Krüger depicted Frau Antje, a Dutch character used to promote cheese and other export articles, with a joint in her mouth, heroin syringes in her arm, and a case of Heineken, in a landscape of dirty tulips and polluting smokestacks.

His articles have also appeared in translation in Salon, through an arrangement with Der Spiegel.
