= Saadah Airport =

Airport in Yemen

Saadah Airport Sadah
- IATA: SYE; ICAO: OYSH

Summary
- Airport type: Public
- Serves: Saada
- Elevation AMSL: 5,940 ft / 1,811 m
- Coordinates: 16°58′00″N 43°43′45″E

Map
- Location of the airport in Yemen

Runways
Direction	Length		Surface
Direction	ft	m	Surface
18/36	9,840	3,000	Asphalt
- Source: Google Maps

Saadah (IATA: SYE, ICAO: OYSH) is an airport serving the town of Saada in Yemen. The current runway seems to be bombed, likely as a result of the ongoing conflict in Yemen, and the terminal has been destroyed.

== See also ==
- List of airports in Yemen
- Transport in Yemen
