= YemenSoft =

Yemeni software company

YemenSoft Inc.
- Type: Private
- Founded: 1993
- Headquarters: Sanaa, Yemen
- Key people: Ali Alyousify
- Products: ERP and accounting software
- Services: Web-based business management software
- Website: yemensoft.com

YemenSoft Inc. is a Yemeni software company headquartered in Sanaa, Yemen. The company is known for its creation of the enterprise software to manage business plans, operations, contracts and customer relations. It is headquartered in Sana’a, with regional offices in the Middle East, North America and Africa. As of 2015, YemenSoft solutions are being used by more than 11,000 clients in more than 14 countries.

== History ==
YemenSoft was founded in Sanaa, Yemen, by Ali Alyousify in 1993. Alyousify aimed to create a company that provides customized software for small businesses, institutions and individual offices. YemenSoft provides software to various sectors. The company announced their first financial system, Al-Mohaseb1 as an open source software.

After the completing World Bank project in Yemen, YemenSoft started expanding in the Middle east and North Africa. It also initiated its first office in Jeddah, Saudi Arabia in 2009 and further expanded in Cairo, Egypt in 2010 after enhancing their services through new solutions "Motakamel plus and Onyx Pro". Ultimate Solution Inc. is the official distributor in Saudi Arabia and is a sister company.

== Products ==
- Onyx Pro supports back-office operations for large organization which includes financial, human resources, orders, manufacturing, inventory, shipping and billing.
- Motakamel Plus supports back-office operations for Medium and small which includes financial, human resources, inventory, shipping and billing.
- AlMohasib1 is a free supported financial application which can be downloaded and used.

== Recognition ==
In 2012 YemenSoft was listed by RED HERRING as one of the 100 companies around the world that provide products according to international standards and "clear future vision". In 2013 YemenSoft was honored as the "best company of software development" by Investor Corporation, General Investment Authority and Commercial Industrial Chambers Union.

== Partnership ==
In 2002, YemenSoft was chosen by the World Bank for the Yemeni Government Computerization project in partnership with Synerma and Computer Engineering World.
