= Yemenia =

Airline of Yemen

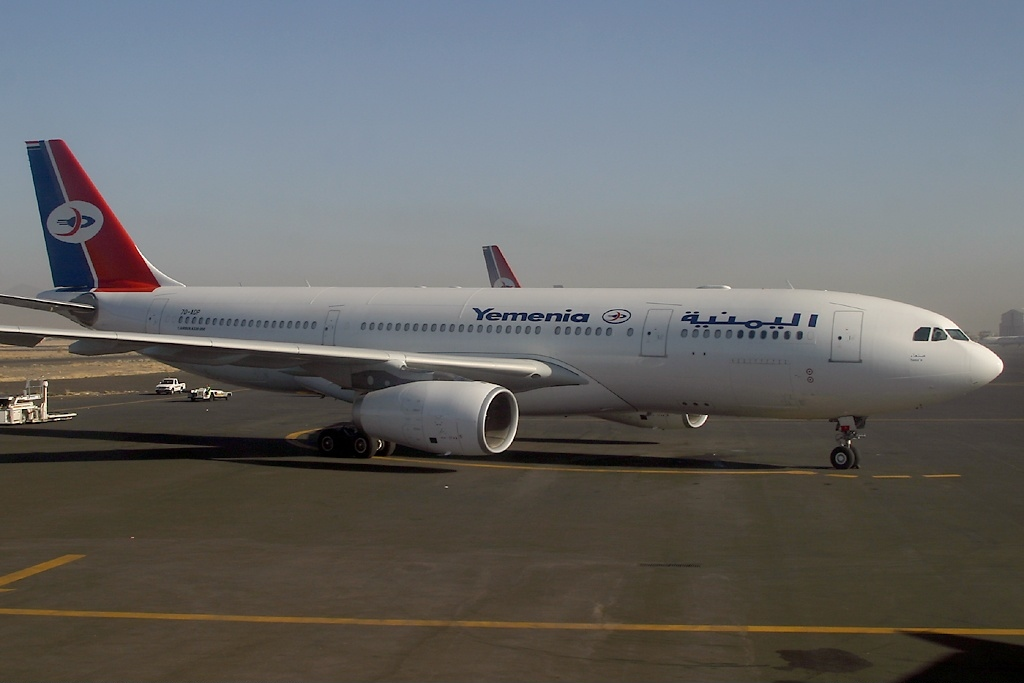
- Yemenia Airbus A330-200
IATA	ICAO	Call sign
IY	IYE	YEMENIA
- Founded: 4 August 1962; 64 years ago
- Hubs: Aden International Airport
- Frequent-flyer program: Yemenia Sama Club
- Fleet size: 4
- Destinations: 11
- Parent company: Government of Yemen (51%)
- Headquarters: Sanaa, Yemen
- Key people: Nasser Mahmoud Mohammed (Chairman)
- Website: yemenia.com

Yemenia (Arabic: اليمنية) is the flag carrier of Yemen, based in Aden. It operates scheduled domestic and international passenger flights to destinations in Africa and the Middle East out of its hubs at Aden International Airport, and to a lesser extent Seiyun Airport. The company is a state owned partnership between the government of Yemen (51%) and the government of Saudi Arabia (49%).

== History ==
=== Early years ===
Yemenia dates its origins back to Yemen Airlines, a company that was founded in the second half of the 1940s and owned by the Imam of Yemen. When the Yemen Arab Republic was proclaimed in 1962, Yemen Airlines was issued a new airline licence on 4 August of that year (which remains valid until today), thus becoming the flag carrier of the country, with its head office in the Ministry of Communication Building in Sanaa. In 1967, the airline entered a co-operation with United Arab Airlines, which lasted until 1972. During that period, it was known as Yemen Arab Airlines.

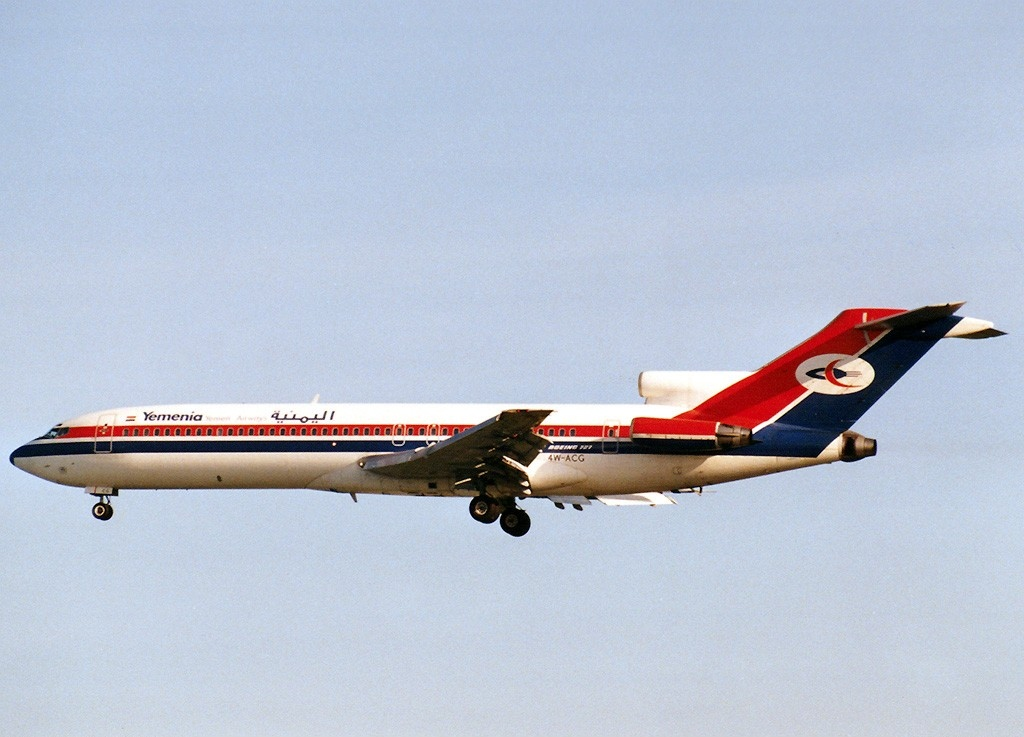
A former Yemenia Boeing 727-200.

In September 1972 and following nationalisation Yemen Airlines was reorganised and renamed Yemen Airways Corporation (YAC). At March 1975 YAC had 60 employees; the airline's fleet consisted of four DC-6Bs and four DC-3s that served domestic destinations and an international network that included Asmara, Cairo, Djibouti, Dhahran, Jeddah and Kuwait. On lease from World Airways, YAC operated a pair of Boeing 737-200 aircraft for two and a half years until the carrier ordered an aircraft of the type in mid-1976. In early 1977, a new airline was jointly established by the governments of the Yemen Arab Republic and Saudi Arabia, with both countries holding 51% and 49% of the shares, respectively, and the name Yemen Airways was adopted on 1 July 1978. In April 1978, a two-year contract for the provision of two Boeing 707-320Cs that included the supply of aircrews and engineering support was signed with British Midland Airways (BMA). In July 1979, the carrier signed a three-year agreement with Pan Am for the provision of technical maintenance and personal training. Two de Havilland Canada Dash 7s were ordered. The unilateral cancellation of the contract signed with BMA by Yemen Airways led the British carrier to file a claim against the Yemeni airline, which resulted in the impoundment of one of its Boeing 727-200s.

In July 1980, the workforce was 750 and chairmanship was held by Shaif M. Saeed. By this time, five Boeing 727-200s, two Boeing 737-200s, one Douglas DC-6A and three DC-3s made up the airline's fleet. Domestic scheduled passenger services linked Sanaa with Al Bayda, Hodeidah, Mareb and Taiz; Abu Dhabi, Athens, Cairo, Damascus, Dhahran, Dubai, Jeddah, Karachi, Kuwait, Muscat, Rome and Sharjah were part of the international network. Cargo services were also undertaken. The two Dash 7s were part of the fleet by March 1985, along with five Boeing 727-200s and one Boeing 737-200, and the airline had expanded its route network to include Amsterdam, Bombay, Frankfurt, Larnaca and London-Gatwick. The number of employees had grown to 1,100.

At March 1990, the carrier employed a staff of 1,980; the chairman was Mohd Al-Haimy. The list of international destinations at this time included Addis Ababa, Amman, Baghdad, Doha, Istanbul, Khartoum, Moscow and Paris. When South Yemen was united with the Yemen Arab Republic to form today's Yemen in 1990, plans were made to form a single national airline by merging South Yemen's Alyemda into Yemenia. To achieve this, the shares held by Saudi Arabia were bought back by the government of Yemen in 1992. The merger took place in 1996. Yemenia became an Airbus A310 operator in 1995 with two leased A310-200s; the introduction of the Airbus A310-300 followed in March 1997.

=== Development in the 2000s ===
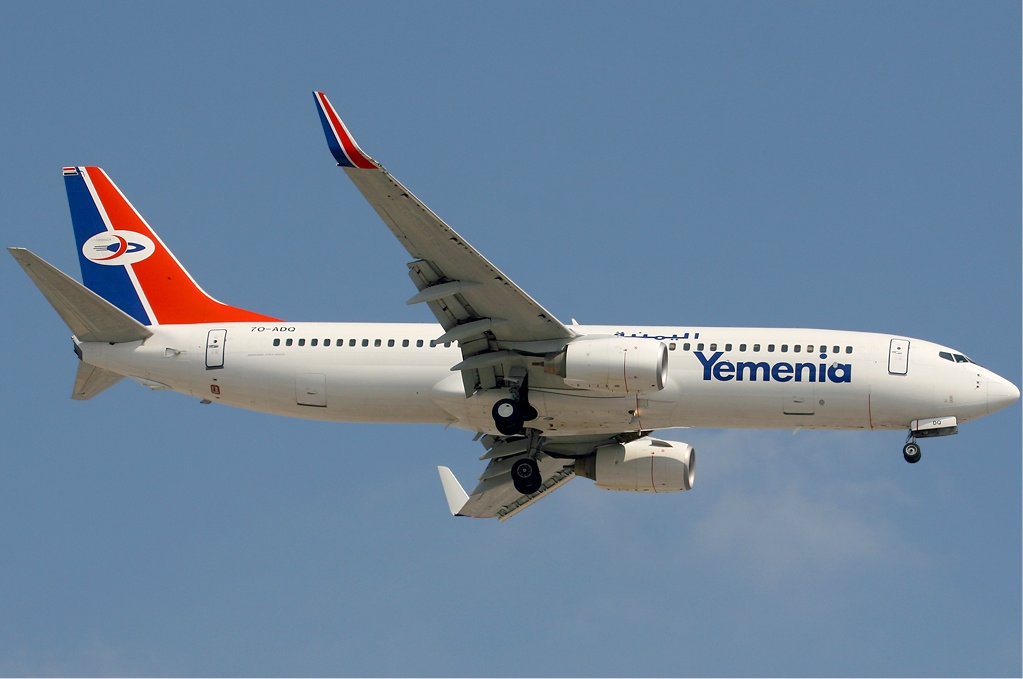
A Yemenia Boeing 737-800. The type was phased in in 2002.

At March 2000, the chairmanship was held by Hassan Sohbi and the number of employees was 4,017. The aircraft operated at this time consisted of three Airbus A310-300s, two Antonov An-26s, five Boeing 727-200 Advanced, one Boeing 737-200 Advanced, one Boeing 737-200C, four Dash 7s, two DHC-6 300s and two Lockheed C130H Hercules. The list of domestic destinations served at this time were Aden, Al Ghaydah, Ataq, Hodeidah, Riyan Mukalla, Sanaa, Seiyun, Socotra and Taiz, while Abu Dhabi, Addis Ababa, Amman, Asmara, Bahrain, Beirut, Cairo, Damascus, Dar es Salaam, Djibouti, Doha, Dubai, Frankfurt, Jeddah, Johannesburg, Karachi, Khartoum, London, Moroni, Mumbai, Nairobi, Paris, Riyadh, Rome and Sharjah comprised the international network. On lease from International Lease Finance Corporation (ILFC), the first Boeing 737-800 joined the fleet in May 2002. The first Airbus A330-200 entered the fleet in 2004 on lease from ILFC.

Since 2008, a number of safety actions by the European Union have been taken against Yemenia because of alleged poor maintenance standards in Yemen. In July 2009, France suspended the airworthiness certificates of two Yemenia Airbus A310 aircraft that were registered in the country, following the crash of one aircraft of the type in the Indian Ocean in late June the same year. The airline discontinued serving its European network in October 2009. Flights to Frankfurt were relaunched in December 2009. Since then, systematic inspections of Yemenia aircraft parked at EU airports are carried out, in order to assess and verify the safety standards. On 20 January 2010, then British Prime Minister Gordon Brown announced that, owing to concerns of terrorist activity in Yemen, flights between the UK and the country would be suspended, as long as the security situation would not improve.

=== 2015–onwards ===
In March 2015, Yemenia was forced to suspend all flight operations until further notice due both to a military conflict that had Sanaa International Airport as a target of air raids and to restrictions over the Yemeni airspace. In August 2015, Yemenia resumed flights to Aden International Airport, with the first flight originating from Saudi Arabia. The blockade was reinstated on 21 February 2016, and lifted on 14 November 2017, when the first commercial flight touched down at Aden International Airport. Flights were cancelled once again, this time for less than a week, resuming on 1 February 2018. According to The National newspaper, in November 2018 Yemenia announced that they would be seeking to resume flights from Aden International Airport to Dubai, Abu Dhabi, Muscat and Salalah in the Persian Gulf and Asmara, Moroni, and Djibouti in Africa, as well as leasing more aircraft. However, there has not been any addition to the destinations of Yemenia airlines (Cairo, Amman, Jeddah, Khartum and Mumbai).

In May 2020, during the COVID-19 pandemic in Yemen, Yemenia operated repatriation flights to Egypt, Jordan, and India. The airline received $1.15 million in compensation. In June 2020, Chairman Ahmed Masood Alwani announced that the airline's two Airbus A310s would be phased out.

On 16 May 2022, Yemenia resumed limited commercial operations out of Sanaa International Airport, its former main hub. The first Yemenia flight carried 151 passengers to the Jordanian capital Amman.

On 17 June 2023, the first direct flight between Yemen and Saudi Arabia in nearly seven years has taken more than 270 Yemenis from rebel-held Sanaa to Jeddah, signaling easing tensions between the two countries. The flight by Yemenia carried Yemeni Muslims embarking on the annual Islamic pilgrimage of Hajj in the Saudi city of Mecca.

In June 2024, a thousand of Yemeni Hajj pilgrims were stranded in Saudi Arabia after the Houthis seized four out of the seven Yemenia aircraft and took control of Yemania repair facilities in Sanaa, preventing them from returning to Jeddah airport to carry the pilgrims home.

On 28 July 2024, it was announced that Yemenia would resume flights from Sanaa International Airport to Egypt and India in the following week.

During the Gaza War, the Houthis launched multiple missile attacks against Israeli territory, and hijacked the international shipping industry in the Red Sea, deepening the Red Sea crisis. As a result of this confrontation, Israel intensified its aerial campaign against the Houthis, launching airstrikes on the Sanaa International Airport and destroying all four operational planes of Yemenia in May 2025.

== Corporate affairs ==
=== Headquarters ===
The head office is located in the Hassaba District, in Downtown Sanaa, however the building was destroyed by fire during fighting in May 2011. On 3 June the same year, during the 2011 Yemeni revolution, the building was again set on fire.

== Destinations ==
As of July 2024, Yemenia operates scheduled flights to five domestic and six international destinations with most originating at Sanaa International Airport, Aden International Airport and Seiyun Airport.

Country	City	Airport	Note	Refs
Bahrain	Manama	Bahrain International Airport	Terminated	
Bangladesh	Dhaka	Hazrat Shahjalal International Airport	Suspended	
China	Guangzhou	Guangzhou Baiyun International Airport	Terminated	
Comoros	Moroni	Prince Said Ibrahim International Airport	Terminated	
Djibouti	Ambouli	Djibouti–Ambouli International Airport		
Egypt	Cairo	Cairo International Airport		
Ethiopia	Addis Ababa	Addis Ababa Bole International Airport		
Eritrea	Asmara	Asmara International Airport	Terminated	
France	Paris	Orly Airport	Terminated	
France	Marseille	Marseille Provence Airport	Terminated	
Germany	Frankfurt	Frankfurt Airport	Terminated	
India	Delhi	Indira Gandhi International Airport	Terminated	
India	Mumbai	Chhatrapati Shivaji Maharaj International Airport		
Indonesia	Jakarta	Soekarno–Hatta International Airport	Terminated	
Iraq	Baghdad	Baghdad International Airport	Terminated	
Italy	Rome	Leonardo da Vinci–Fiumicino Airport	Terminated	
Jordan	Amman	Queen Alia International Airport		
Kenya	Nairobi	Jomo Kenyatta International Airport	Terminated	
Kuwait	Kuwait City	Kuwait International Airport		
Lebanon	Beirut	Beirut–Rafic Hariri International Airport	Suspended	
Malaysia	Kuala Lumpur	Kuala Lumpur International Airport	Terminated	
Netherlands	Amsterdam	Amsterdam Airport Schiphol	Terminated	
Oman	Muscat	Muscat International Airport	Suspended	
Pakistan	Karachi	Jinnah International Airport	Terminated	
Qatar	Doha	Hamad International Airport	Terminated	
Russia	Moscow	Sheremetyevo International Airport	Suspended	
Saudi Arabia	Dammam	King Fahd International Airport		
Saudi Arabia	Jeddah	King Abdulaziz International Airport		
Saudi Arabia	Riyadh	King Khalid International Airport		
Serbia	Belgrade	Belgrade Nikola Tesla Airport	Terminated	
Spain	Madrid	Madrid–Barajas Airport	Terminated	
South Africa	Johannesburg	O. R. Tambo International Airport	Terminated	
Sudan	Khartoum	Khartoum International Airport	Terminated	
Turkey	Istanbul	Atatürk Airport	Terminated	
United Arab Emirates	Abu Dhabi	Abu Dhabi International Airport	Terminated	
United Arab Emirates	Dubai	Al Maktoum International Airport		
United Arab Emirates	Dubai	Dubai International Airport	Terminated	
United Arab Emirates	Sharjah	Sharjah International Airport	Terminated	
United Kingdom	London	Gatwick Airport	Terminated	
Yemen	Aden	Aden International Airport	Hub	
Yemen	Al Ghaydah	Al Ghaydah Airport		
Yemen	Albuq	Albuq Airport	Terminated	
Yemen	Ataq	Ataq Airport	Terminated	
Yemen	Hodeida	Hodeida International Airport	Terminated	
Yemen	Mukalla	Riyan International Airport		
Yemen	Saada	Saadah Airport	Terminated	
Yemen	Sanaa	Sanaa International Airport		
Yemen	Seiyun	Seiyun Airport		
Yemen	Socotra	Socotra Airport		
Yemen	Taiz	Taiz International Airport	Terminated	

== Fleet ==
=== Current fleet ===
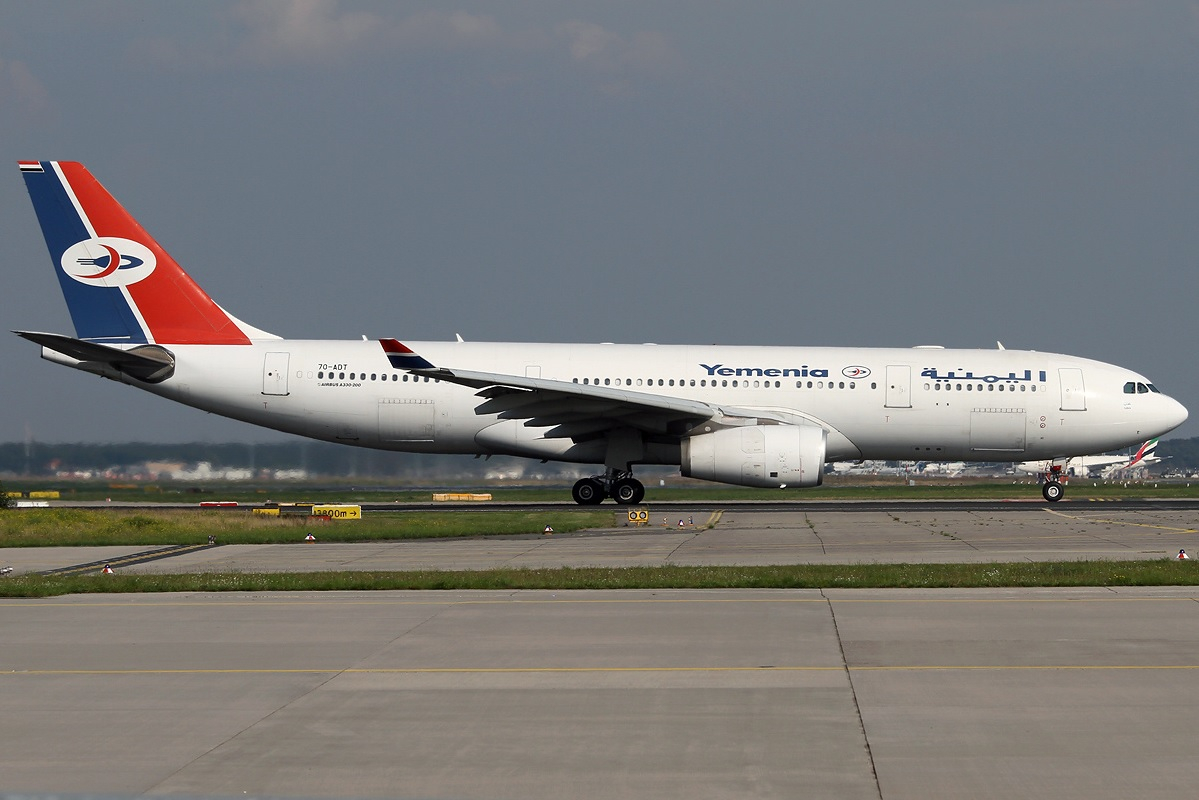
A Yemenia Airbus A330-200 at Frankfurt Airport in 2014. The first aircraft of the type entered the fleet in 2004.

As of November 2026, Yemenia has an all-Airbus fleet that consists of the following aircraft:

Yemenia fleet
Aircraft	In Service	Orders	Passengers			Notes
Aircraft	In Service	Orders	J	Y	Total	Notes
Airbus A320-200	4	—	12	138	150	Introduced 2011. Three of six were destroyed in the air strike by Israel on Sanaa Airport on 6 May 2025 and another one on 28 May 2025
Airbus A320neo	—	4	TBA			
Airbus A321neo	—	4	TBA			
Airbus A350-900	—	10	TBA			
Total	4	18				

=== Fleet development ===
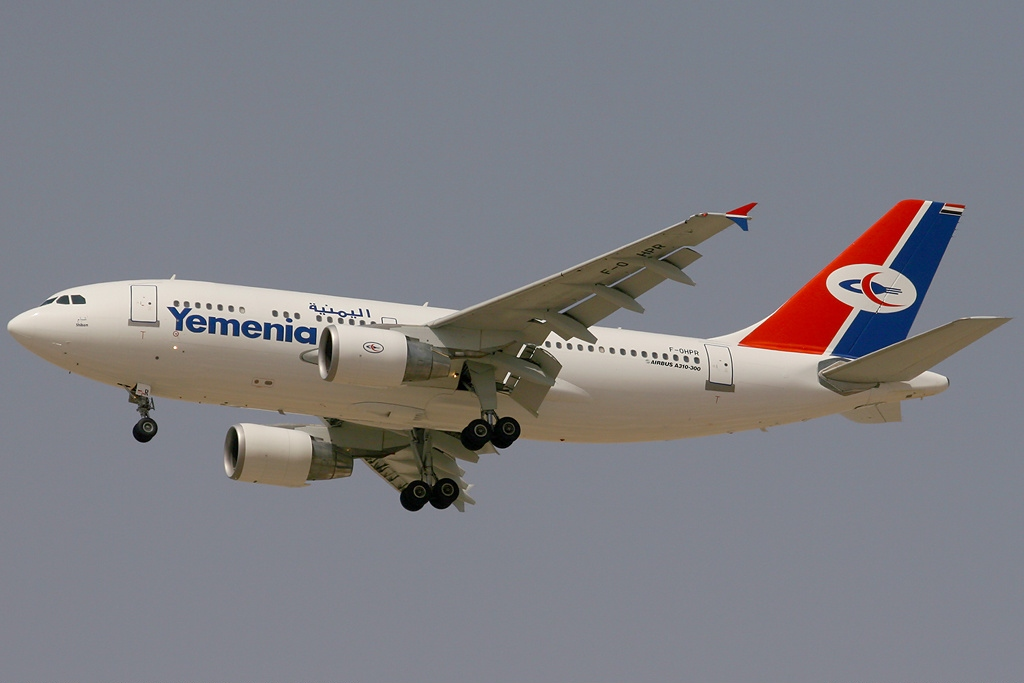
A former Yemenia Airbus A310-300. The first aircraft of the type joined the fleet in March 1997.

In 2007, during the Dubai Air Show, the carrier signed a contract for the purchase of ten Airbus A350-800s. The order was subsequently altered to include the larger -900 version. In November 2009, Yemenia signed a memorandum of understanding with Airbus for USD 700 million that covered ten Airbus A320s; the order was firmed up in January 2010. The first Airbus A320 joined the fleet in April 2011. The A320 order was later restructured and four of them were converted to the A320neo.

=== Historical fleet ===
Over the years, the airline has operated the following aircraft types:

Aircraft	Introduced	Retired	Notes
Airbus A310-200	1995	Unknown	
Airbus A310-300	1997	2020	
Airbus A330-200	2014	2025	The sole A330 was destroyed in the air strike by Israel on Sanaa Airport on 6 May 2025
Antonov An-26	Unknown	Unknown	
Boeing 707-320C	Unknown	Unknown	
Boeing 727	1979	2006	
Boeing 737-200	1982	2005	
Boeing 737-800	2002	2011	
Boeing 747SP	Unknown	2010	
de Havilland Canada DHC-6	Unknown	1995	
de Havilland Canada Dash 7	1981	1990	
Douglas DC-3	Unknown	Unknown	
Ilyushin Il-76	1998	Unknown	
Lockheed C-130 Hercules	Unknown	Unknown	

== Historical pictures gallery ==
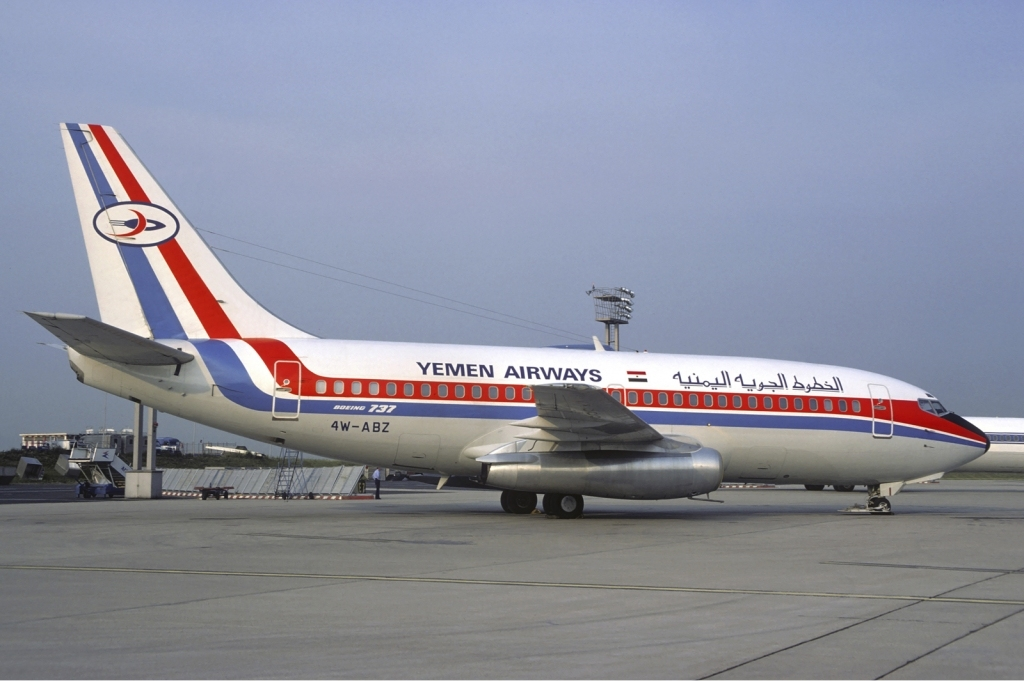
Boeing 737-200 entered service in early 80s.

== Incidents and accidents ==
Yemenia has experienced the following incidents and accidents including three hijackings:

- On 3 November 1958, a Yemen Airlines (as the company was named at that time) Douglas C-47 Skytrain (registered YE-AAB) crashed near Poggiodomo in Italy, killing the eight people on board. The aircraft had been on a flight from Rome Ciampino Airport to Yemen with a planned stopover at Belgrade, carrying the Yemenite Under Secretary of Foreign Affairs.
- On 19 March 1969, a Yemen Airlines C-47 (registered 4W-AAS) crashed near Taiz during a post-maintenance test flight, killing the four occupants. It turned out that the elevator of the aircraft did not work properly. Repair work had been done on that part, because it had been damaged some days earlier in a ground collision.
- On 16 September 1971, another Yemen Airlines C-47 (registered 4W-ABI) crashed near Rajince, Serbia when it encountered severe icing conditions, killing the five people on board. The aircraft had been on a multi-stopover flight from Yemen to Europe and had just departed Belgrade Airport.
- On 1 November 1972, a Yemen Airlines Douglas DC-3 (registered 4W-ABJ) was destroyed in a crash-landing at an airfield near Beihan.
- On 25 August 1973, a Yemen Airlines Douglas DC-6 was hijacked during a passenger flight from Taiz to Asmara. The perpetrator forced the pilots to divert the aircraft with fifteen other passengers and six crew members on board to Kuwait Airport, for which a refueling stop at Djibouti Airport turned out to be necessary. In Kuwait, the hijacker surrendered to local police forces.
- On 13 December 1973, a Yemen Airlines DC-3 (registered 4W-ABR) crashed near Taiz.
- On 23 February 1975, a Yemen Airlines DC-3 was hijacked during a flight from Al Hudaydah to Sanaa and forced to land at an airport in Saudi Arabia. There, the aircraft was stormed and the perpetrator overpowered.
- On 14 November 1978, a Yemen Airlines C-47 (registered 4W-ABY) was damaged beyond repair in a heavy landing at an airfield near Ma'rib.
- On 26 June 2000, a Yemenia Boeing 737-200C, registered 7O-ACQ, was damaged beyond repair when it veered off the runway upon landing at Khartoum International Airport following a cargo flight from Yemen.
- On 21 January 2001, Yemenia Flight 448, a Boeing 727-200 with 91 passengers and 10 crew on board, was hijacked 15 minutes into a flight from Sanaa to Taiz by an Iraqi man. The plane was forced to land at Djibouti–Ambouli International Airport, where the perpetrator was overpowered by the crew.
- On 1 August 2001, a Boeing 727-200 (registered 7O-ACW) was damaged beyond economic repair when it overran the runway upon landing at Asmara International Airport following a flight from Sanaa with 107 passengers and four crew on board, none of whom were significantly injured.
- On 23 June 2007, a DHC-6 Twin Otter was damaged by gunfire at An Naeem Airstrip, killing one passenger.
- The company's worst accident occurred on 30 June 2009, when Yemenia Flight 626 from Sanaa to Moroni, Comoros crashed into the sea shortly before landing. Of the 142 passengers and eleven crew that had been on the Airbus A310-300 with the registration 7O-ADJ, only a young girl survived the accident.
- In March 2015, a Boeing 747SP (registered 7O-YMN) which was operated in Yemenia branding for the government of Yemen was damaged by gunfire during a militia attack at Aden airport. A subsequent blaze destroyed the aircraft completely.
- In December 2020, a missile attack was made on Aden Airport while several Yemeni cabinet ministers arrived in a Yemenia aircraft. At least 20 people were killed and several injured.
- On 6 May 2025, three Yemenia aircraft were reported to have been destroyed in an Israeli airstrike on Sanaa International Airport.
- On 28 May 2025, another Israeli airstrike on Sanaa International Airport destroyed a Yemenia aircraft that had been chartered to take Hajj pilgrims to Mecca before it could be boarded.

== See also ==
- Transport in Yemen
