= Al Ghaydah Airport =

Airport in Yemen

Al Ghaydha Airport
- IATA: AAY; ICAO: OYGD

Summary
- Airport type: Public
- Serves: Al-Ghaydah
- Elevation AMSL: 134 ft (41 m)
- Coordinates: 16°11′36.1″N 52°10′27.1″E

Map
- Location of the airport in Yemen

Runways
Direction	Length		Surface
Direction	ft	m	Surface
08/26	8,858	2,700	Asphalt

Al Ghaydah Airport (IATA: AAY, ICAO: OYGD) is a public airport serving Al-Ghaydah, the capital of Al-Mahrah Governorate in eastern Yemen. Located approximately 2 km south of the city centre, it provides air access to the country's easternmost governorate, which borders Oman and faces the Arabian Sea. The airport has a single asphalt runway and facilities for domestic passenger services. It is served by Yemenia, which operates flights connecting Al-Ghaydah with other Yemeni destinations.

== History ==
In November 2017, Saudi coalition forces entered Al-Mahrah Governorate and deployed at several strategic facilities, including Al-Ghaydah Airport, the port of Nashtoon and border crossings with Oman. Their arrival at the airport initially met resistance from local security personnel, who objected that the deployment had not been coordinated with the local authorities. The dispute was mediated by local tribal leaders and government officials, but Saudi military involvement in the governorate subsequently expanded.

By March 2018, Saudi forces had turned the airport into a military base and established an operations centre there. The facility was used for military deployments, intelligence activities and the movement of personnel and equipment, while civilian flights were cancelled. Restrictions on access also affected Yemeni government and security officials, according to the Sana'a Center for Strategic Studies.

The Saudi military presence prompted protests in Al-Ghaydah and other parts of the governorate. Demonstrators demanded the withdrawal of Saudi forces and the restoration of local authority control over public facilities, including the airport. In July 2018, an agreement between local tribal leaders, authorities and Saudi representatives was announced, under which the airport was to return to civilian control. Saudi forces subsequently failed to implement the agreement fully, according to the Sana'a Center's account of the dispute. The agreement and reported withdrawal were also covered by Al Jazeera English and Middle East Monitor.

As part of a programme to rehabilitate transport infrastructure in areas under the control of the internationally recognised Yemeni government, the Saudi Development and Reconstruction Program for Yemen funded renovation work at Al-Ghaydah Airport. The project included the reconstruction of passenger halls, the air traffic control tower and terminal facilities, together with the installation of navigation and communications systems, firefighting vehicles and security equipment.

On 20 July 2023, the airport officially reopened to commercial flights after an eight-year interruption. A Yemenia aircraft arriving from Aden marked the resumption of scheduled civilian services. The reopening ceremony was attended by local and national officials, who presented the airport as an important facility for improving transport links to Al-Mahrah and supporting economic activity in the governorate.

In late 2025, renewed political and military tensions in southern and eastern Yemen disrupted air services in several areas. Following the takeover of positions in Al-Mahrah by forces affiliated with the Southern Transitional Council, flights at Al-Ghaydah Airport were suspended for several weeks. On 11 January 2026, Yemeni authorities announced that operations had resumed after security conditions in the governorate had stabilised. The governor of Al-Mahrah received the first incoming Yemenia flight following the suspension.

== Facilities ==
The airport is situated about 41 metres (134 ft) above sea level. Its runway, designated 08/26, measures 2,700 by 45 metres (8,858 by 148 ft) and has an asphalt surface. The runway has a pavement classification number (PCN) of 60 and lacks an instrument landing system. The airport's navigational equipment includes a VHF omnidirectional range and distance measuring equipment (VOR-DME), as well as a non-directional beacon (NDB).

According to the Yemeni civil aviation authority, the airport has a VIP lounge, departure and arrival halls, and a transit hall. Its facilities are designed to accommodate aircraft up to the size of the Airbus A320 and include air traffic control and ground communication services. The published operating period is from sunrise to sunset.

The airport was constructed in two phases. The first phase, completed in 1984, included the terminal building, runway, aircraft aprons and support buildings. A second phase of terminal construction followed in 2000–2001. A later structural assessment and rehabilitation programme examined the terminal and associated airport infrastructure, including its civil, mechanical, electrical and telecommunications systems.

== Airlines and destinations ==
As of November 2026, Yemenia operates domestic services linking Al-Ghaydah with Aden and Socotra. Published schedules list flights on the Aden–Al-Ghaydah–Socotra route, though frequencies may change based on operational conditions.

Airlines	Destinations
Yemenia	Aden, Socotra

== See also ==
- List of airports in Yemen
- Al-Mahrah Governorate
- Yemenia
