= Riyan International Airport =

Airport in Yemen

Riyan International Airport مطار الريّان الدولي (Arabic)
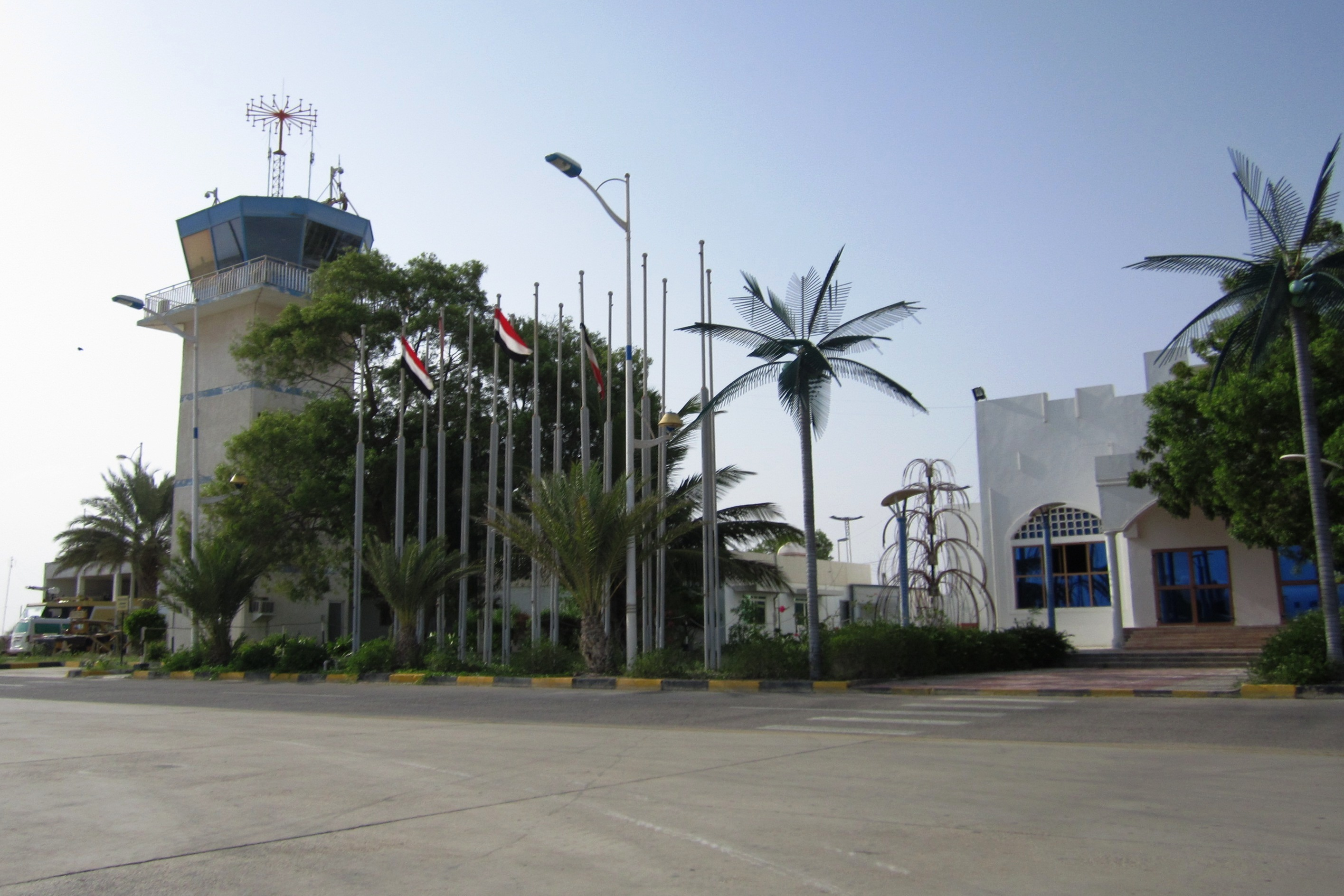
- IATA: RIY; ICAO: OYRN

Summary
- Airport type: Public
- Serves: Mukalla
- Location: Mukalla, Hadhramaut, Yemen
- Built: 1982 (current form)
- Elevation AMSL: 16 m / 54 ft
- Coordinates: 14°39′45″N 049°22′30″E

Map
- Location of airport in Yemen

Runways
Direction	Length		Surface
Direction	m	ft	Surface
06/24	3,000	9,843	Asphalt

Riyan International Airport (Arabic: مطار الريّان الدولي), also known as the Riyan Mukalla International Airport (Arabic: مطار ريّان المكلا الدولي), is an international airport in Mukalla, Yemen. It is not to be confused with the former RAF Riyan, which was located closer to Mukalla.

== History ==
In 1979, construction of Riyan Airport began with West German engineering consultation, financed by the Kuwait Fund. The total cost for the construction was 10,500 Yemeni rials. Construction of the new airport finished on May 1982.

In 2001, the airport got renamed from "Riyan Airport" to "Mukalla Airport," but its old name remained in use in international civil aviation documents and navigational devices operating at the airport still broadcast its international definition of "Riyan Airport."

In 2008, the airport's Air traffic control and Airport security systems got upgraded and the first ever flight academy in Yemen, Golden Way Academy, got opened.

Flights were suspended in March 2015 as a result of the Yemeni civil war which led Al Qaeda militants to take advantage of the turmoil and control Mukalla. A no-fly zone over Yemen was imposed by the Saudi Arabian-led intervention due to the military conflict. Mukalla was later liberated from Al Qaeda, but the airport remained closed until the Emirates Red Crescent funded the building of new terminals and renovated the old airport at a cost of AED 25 million.

In January 2018, the Airport got renamed back to "Riyan International Airport."

On November 27, 2019, the airport was reopened with the support of the Emirates Red Crescent. The Governor of Hadramawt province, Maj Gen Faraj Al Bahsani, said he was optimistic that the return of flights would bring economic benefits. On 9 April 2021, Yemenia, the Yemeni flag carrier, restarted flights to Socotra and Aden.

== Airlines and destinations ==
Airlines	Destinations
Yemenia	Aden, Cairo, Dubai–Al Maktoum, Jeddah, Socotra

== See also ==
- List of airports in Yemen
- RAF Riyan - a former Royal Air Force station located 4 kilometres west from the airport
