= Beihan Airport =

Airport in Yemen

- IATA: BHN; ICAO: OYBN

Summary
- Airport type: Public
- Location: Beihan, Yemen
- Elevation AMSL: 3,800 ft / 1,158 m
- Coordinates: 14°46′55″N 045°43′12″E

Map
- Location of airport in Yemen

Runways
Direction	Length		Surface
Direction	m	ft	Surface
17/35	1,670	5,479	Asphalt

Beihan Airport (IATA: BHN, ICAO: OYBN) is an airport serving Beihan, a city in the Shabwah Governorate, which lies in the southeastern part of Yemen.

== Facilities ==
The airport resides at an elevation of 3,800 feet (1,158 m) above mean sea level. It has one runway designated 17/35 with an asphalt surface measuring 1,670 by 23 metres (5,479 ft × 75 ft).

== See also ==
- List of airports in Yemen
