= Taiz International Airport =

Airport in Yemen

Taiz International Airport مَطَار تَعِزّ ٱلدَّوْلِي (in Arabic)
- IATA: TAI; ICAO: OYTZ

Summary
- Airport type: Public
- Location: Taiz
- Elevation AMSL: 4,838 ft / 1,475 m
- Coordinates: 13°41′09″N 044°08′21″E

Map
- Location of airport in Yemen

Runways
Direction	Length		Surface
Direction	ft	m	Surface
01/19	10,040	3,060	Asphalt

Taiz International Airport (Arabic: مَطَار تَعِزّ ٱلدَّوْلِي, romanized: Maṭār Ta‘izz Ad-Duwalī, (IATA: TAI, ICAO: OYTZ)) is a public airport located in Taiz, the capital of the Taiz Governorate, Yemen.

== Airlines and destinations ==
As of 2021, there are no longer any scheduled services at the airport after Yemenia suspended all routes in 2015 due to the ongoing regional conflict. Previously, the airline served few domestic and international destinations from here.

== Military usage ==
The airport is home to Taiz Air Base which consist of the Taiz Air Brigade which is home to both 8 and 9 Helicopter Squadrons.

== Accidents and incidents ==
- On 19 March 1969, a Douglas C-47 Skytrain 4W-AAS of Yemen Airlines crashed shortly after take-off due to an incorrectly assembled elevator trim tab which operated in the opposite manner to normal. The aircraft was operating a test flight, all four crew were killed.
- On 13 December 1973, a Douglas DC-3 4W-ABR of Yemen Airlines was reported to have been damaged beyond economic repair.

== See also ==
- List of airports in Yemen
