= RAF Riyan =

Former British airfield in Yemen

RAF Riyan
- Riyan, Hadhramaut Governorate in Yemen

Site information
- Type: Defunct
- Owner: Air Ministry
- Operator: Royal Air Force
- Controlled by: AHQ Aden
- Condition: Demolished

Location
- Shown within Yemen RAF Riyan (Middle East)
- Coordinates: 14°39′07.27″N 49°19′27.90″E

Site history
- Built: 1942
- In use: 1942 - 1967

Royal Air Force Riyan or more commonly RAF Riyan is a former Royal Air Force station located in Riyan, Hadhramaut Governorate in Yemen. The station primarily supported logistics operations of the Royal Air Force during World War II.

== History ==
Prior to the establishment of a permanent airfield at Riyan, a landing ground existed at Riyan in 1939 to serve political missions. In 1941, the route through Fertile Crescent was considered vulnerable, and an alternative route via Sudan and Aden to Karachi was ruled in. Stops at Aden, Riyan, Salalah, Masirah, Ra's al-Hadid in the Aden Protectorate and Jiwani in India were planned.

Subsequently, construction of airfields at these locations commenced, and Riyan Airfield was constructed in 1942 for reconnaissance and ferrying operations of the Royal Air Force's (RAF) Bristol Blenheims. It was established along with other airfields in Socotra Island and Bandar Qasim on the British Somaliland coast. The No. 31 Staging Post was established at Riyan Airfield in March 1943, and it was later absorbed in 1 December 1943. In May 1944, the Famine Relief Flight consisting of eight Vickers Wellingtons, was established at Riyan Airfield. The flight airlifted a daily total of 24 tons of grain to Al-Qatn to be taken by transport and camel train to towns where soup kitchens were set up by RAF personnel. Prior to the flight, the Hadhramaut experienced a drought and loss of foreign remittances between 1943 and 1944, leading to the starvation and deaths of 10,000 people.

Riyan Airfield was established as an operational Royal Air Force station in 1945, with most station buildings including an ATC being constructed of that year. Most buildings were painted white and flat-topped, while the runway itself composed of sand. There were three messes and an airmen's club run by the Navy, Army and Air Force Institutes, and barracks rooms housed up to 12 personnel while senior non-commissioned officers occupied individual rooms. RAF Riyan primarily operated as a route station, refuelling aircraft that operated along the South Arabian route. It also handled daily civilian traffic, including Aden Airways Douglas DC-3 aircraft providing a service between Aden and the Eastern Aden Protectorate. After World War II, RAF Riyan was reduced to care-and-maintenance status in April 1946. The airfield was infrequently used by civilian aircraft, and primarily operated as an emergency landing ground.

=== Post-war ===
On 5 February, 1949, RAF Douglas C-47 Skytrains began an airlift of aid to the Hadhramaut Valley, held at RAF Riyan. Prior to the airlift, a lack of rain caused crops to fail, leading to food-shortages in the region. By 10 February, ground crews based at Riyan Airfield continuously worked to keep Dakotas serviceable for flight, where sorties were made from the airfield to a dropping zone. Every Dakota usually dropped 72 sacks of millet during the three runs over the drop zone, which was later switched to Mukharim due to a change in need.

During 1954, RAF Riyan was commanded by Flying Officer Cedric Cook. At the time, the base stationed 13 airmen and a group of native labourers who maintained the airfield. It still operated as an important refuelling stop on routes to the Far East. Bedouins, who were still living a tribal life, had become accustomed to jet-engined aircraft constantly flying by. Personnel from RAF Khormaksar toured RAF Riyan every six months, and some were posted there. The base had grown to include a fire section, and a beach area for leisure activities, in which a fireman served at Riyan from August 1957 until March 1958. In the late 1950s, the uprising insurgence in the Eastern Aden Protectorate led to the development of RAF Riyan into an air base in 1960. Afterwards, Hawker Hunters of the No. 208 Squadron RAF were stationed there. The fighters launched attacks against rebels in the Eastern parts of the Aden protectorate, seeing extensive combat service. RAF Riyan was included in the Riyan–Salalah–Masirah (RSM) route, serviced by Armstrong Argosies from the No. 105 Squadron RAF. By 1967, Westland Wessex detachments operated at RAF Riyan, supporting operations of the Irish Guards and later the Special Air Service. During May 1967, stocks and equipments at the base were reduced to permit evacuations that were to take place during the southwest monsoon period. At the end of 1967, the RAF withdrew from the airfield, leading to the cease of operations.

== Facilities ==
By 1958, RAF Riyan was equipped with four runways. Three of which were gravelled, and are listed as follows with their dimensions, orientation and load bearing capacity: 6,000 by 150 ft orientated WNW/ESE and 60,000 lb, 5,780 by 150 ft orientated ENE/WSW and 33,000 lb, and 3,380 by 150 ft orientated N/S and also 33,000 lb. The fourth runway runs along the 6,000 ft long runway and is paved with bitumen. It measures 3,240 by 150 ft with same orientation. RAF Riyan was equipped with accommodation for 100 personnel, dispensary, and a small building. It could only handle fair-weather operations, and would often become unserviceable during rainy season between January and March.
