= Mukayras =

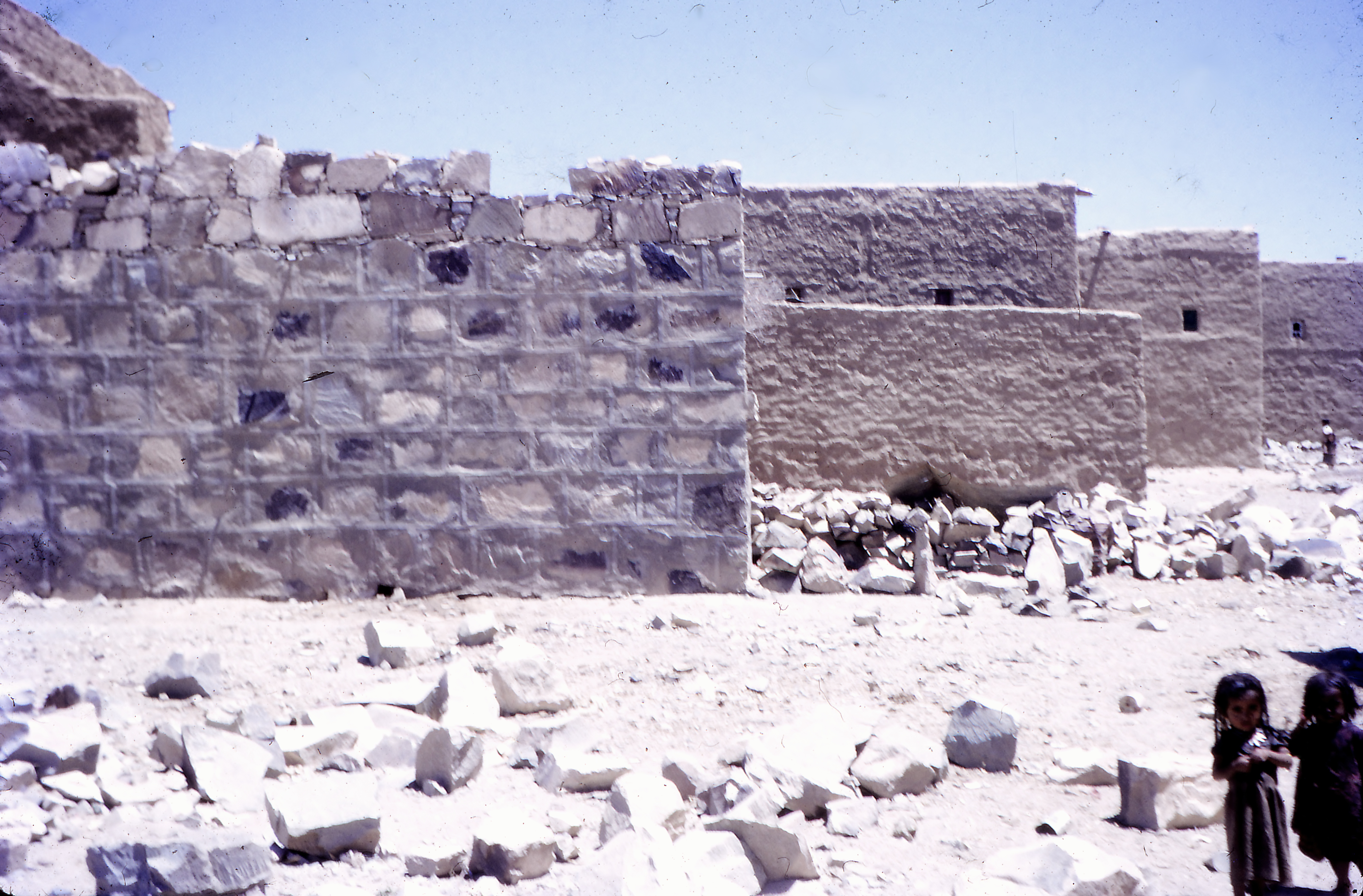
- Mukayras, Al Bayda, Yemen in 1966

- Location in Yemen
- Coordinates: 13°56′38″N 45°40′25″E
- Country: Yemen
- Governorate: Al Bayda Governorate
- Time zone: UTC+3 (Yemen Standard Time)

Mukayras (Arabic: مكيراس) is a town in a district of the same name, in Al Bayda Governorate, Yemen. It is located at around 13°56′38″N 45°40′25″E at an elevation of about 2170 m.

It was one of the South Yemen Protectorates under British rule from 1839-1967.
