= Al Ghaydah =

City in Al Mahrah Governorate, Yemen

Al Ghaydah الغيضة
- City
- Location in Yemen
- Coordinates: 16°12′38″N 52°10′16″E
- Country: Yemen
- Governorate: Al Mahrah
- District: Al Ghaydah

Population
  - Total: 10,948
- Time zone: UTC+3 (Yemen Standard Time)

Al Ghaydah (Arabic: الغيضة) is the capital city of Al Mahrah Governorate in south-eastern Yemen. It is one of the easternmost cities in the country, located near Yemen's border with Oman.

== History ==
=== Civil war ===
Al Ghaydah has been relatively unscathed during the Yemeni Civil War, and as a result has become a destination for many internally displaced persons fleeing the fighting.

As part of its involvement in the civil war, Saudi Arabia has stationed its 123rd Infantry Brigade security unit in Al-Ghaydah. In 2017, the Saudi-Emirati coalition seized Al Ghaydah Airport, but handed it back to civil authorities in 2018 following protests. Saudi Arabia's stated reason for stationing troops at the airport was to combat smuggling. As of 2018, the coalition controlled much of the territory in Al Mahrah Governorate.

According to Human Rights Watch, Saudi forces administer an informal detention center in Al Ghaydah's airport, where they have tortured prisoners they suspect of supporting Saudi Arabia's opponents in Yemen.

== Transport and infrastructure ==
The city is served by Al Ghaydah Airport.

The FALCON undersea cable connects Yemen to the internet through a terminus in Al Ghaydah, as well as another in Al Hudaydah.

== Climate ==
Al Ghaydah has a hot desert climate (Köppen climate classification: BWh)

Climate data for Al Ghaydah
Month	Jan	Feb	Mar	Apr	May	Jun	Jul	Aug	Sep	Oct	Nov	Dec	Year
Mean daily maximum °C (°F)	27.8 (82.0)	28.2 (82.8)	30.6 (87.1)	32.6 (90.7)	34.7 (94.5)	35.1 (95.2)	32.7 (90.9)	32.3 (90.1)	32.6 (90.7)	31.9 (89.4)	30.5 (86.9)	28.5 (83.3)	31.5 (88.6)
Daily mean °C (°F)	22.7 (72.9)	23.4 (74.1)	25.6 (78.1)	27.7 (81.9)	30.1 (86.2)	30.7 (87.3)	28.9 (84.0)	28.3 (82.9)	28.4 (83.1)	26.8 (80.2)	25.1 (77.2)	23.6 (74.5)	26.8 (80.2)
Mean daily minimum °C (°F)	17.6 (63.7)	18.7 (65.7)	20.7 (69.3)	22.9 (73.2)	25.5 (77.9)	26.4 (79.5)	25.1 (77.2)	24.4 (75.9)	24.3 (75.7)	21.7 (71.1)	19.8 (67.6)	18.7 (65.7)	22.2 (71.9)
Average precipitation mm (inches)	8 (0.3)	4 (0.2)	6 (0.2)	9 (0.4)	1 (0.0)	1 (0.0)	3 (0.1)	3 (0.1)	0 (0)	2 (0.1)	7 (0.3)	7 (0.3)	51 (2)
Source: Climate-Data.org
