= Transport in Yemen =

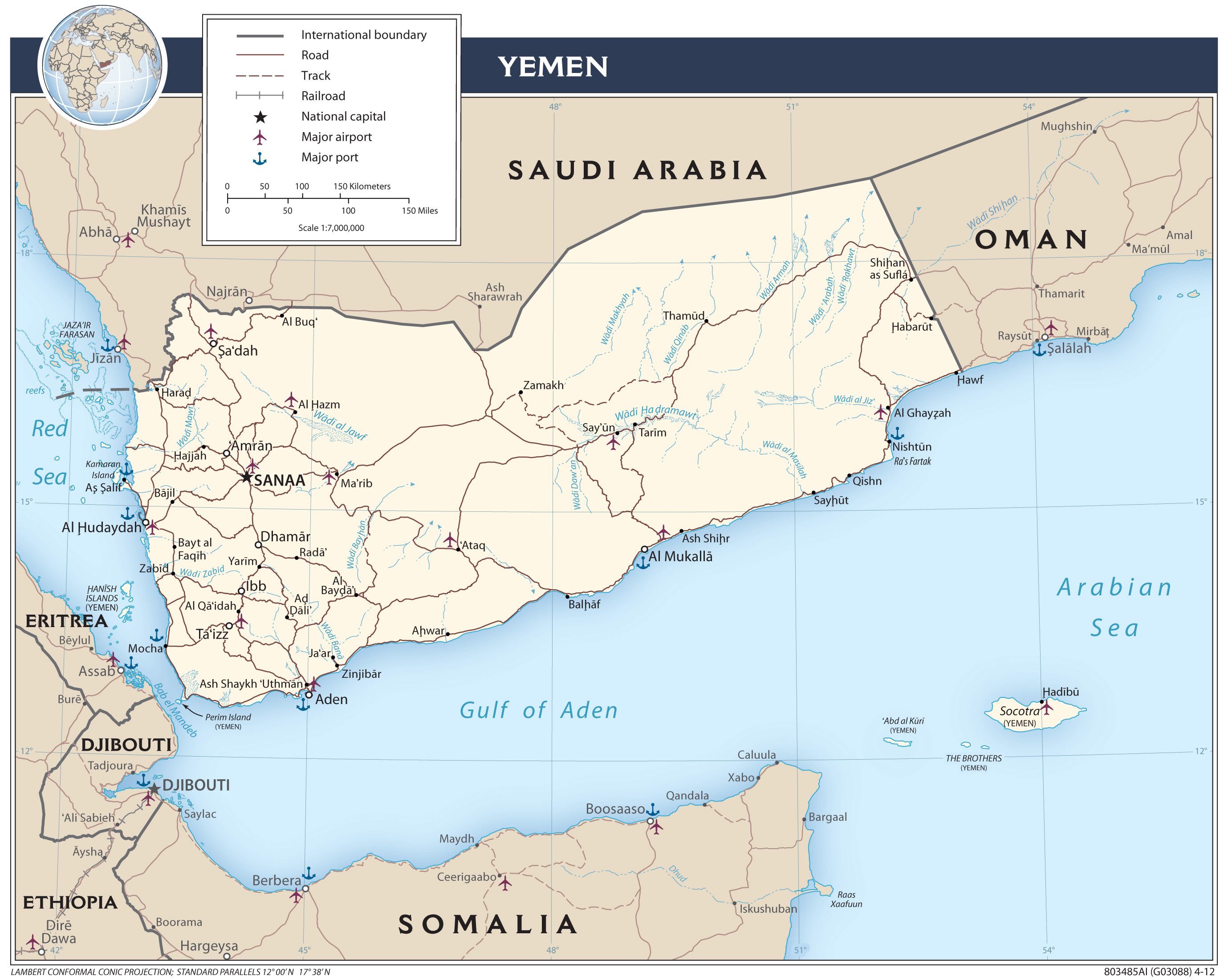
Yemen transportation map

As a direct consequence of the country's poverty, Yemen compares unfavorably with its Middle Eastern neighbors in terms of transportation infrastructure and communications network. The roads are generally poor, although several projects are planned to upgrade the system. There is no rail network, efforts to upgrade airport facilities have languished, and telephone and Internet usage and capabilities are limited. The Port of Aden has shown a promising recovery from a 2002 attack; container throughput increased significantly in 2004 and 2005. However, the expected imposition of higher insurance premiums for shippers in 2006 may result in reduced future throughput. The announcement in summer 2005 that the port's main facility, Aden Container Terminal, would for the next 30 or more years be run by Dubai Ports International brings with it the prospect of future expansion.

== Roads ==
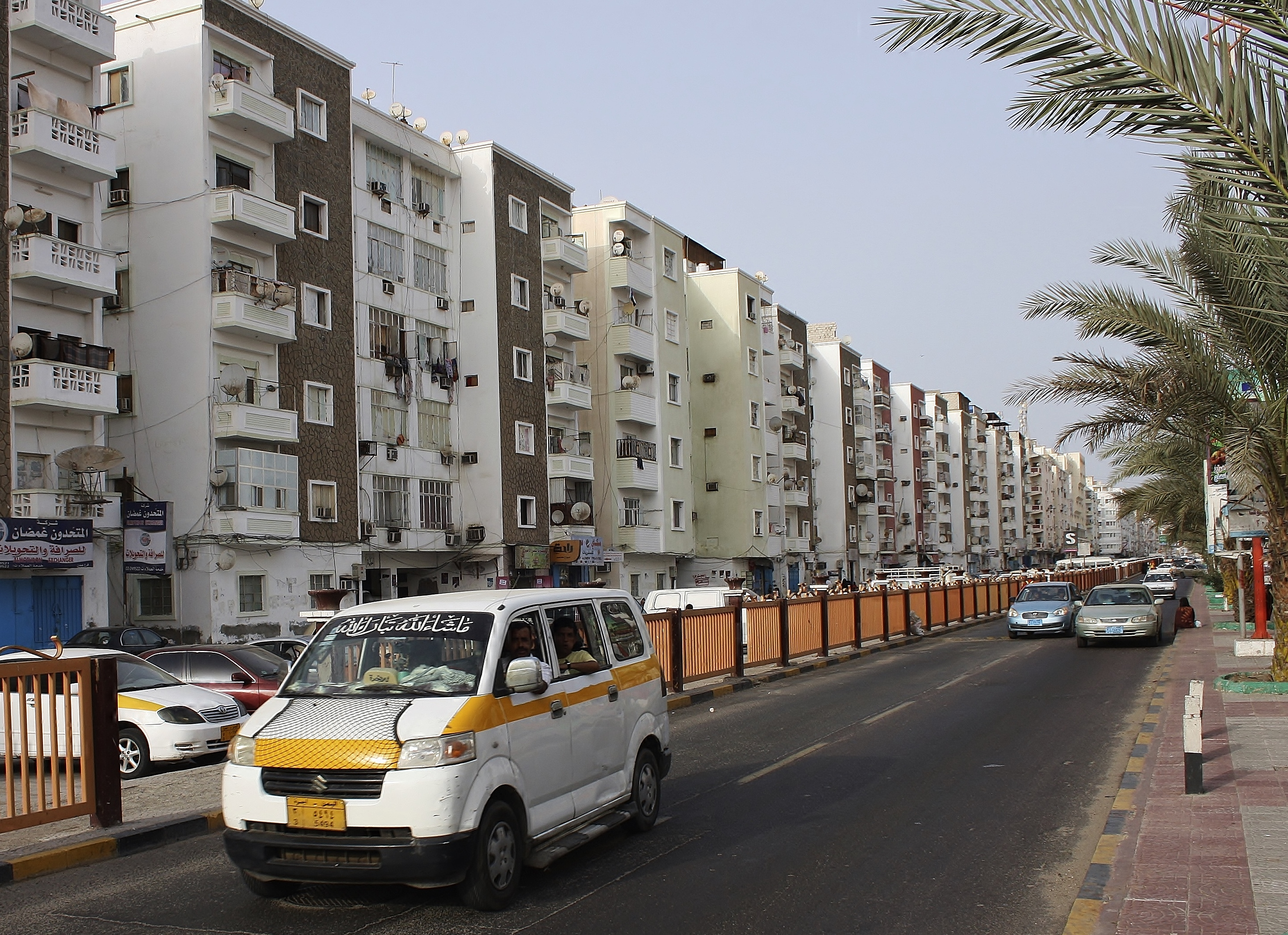
Minivan on road in Aden

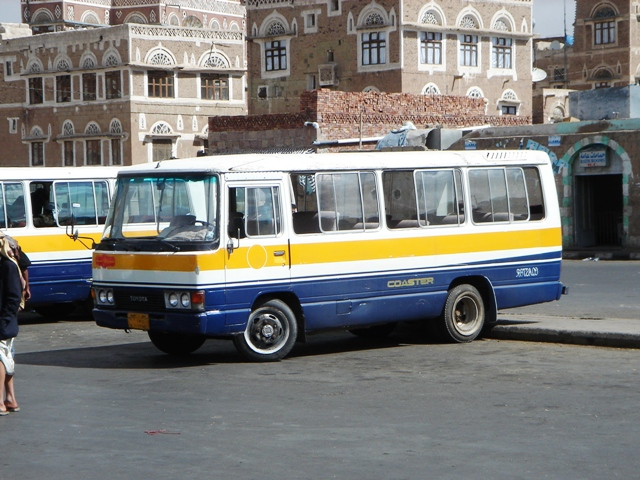
Bus in Sanaa

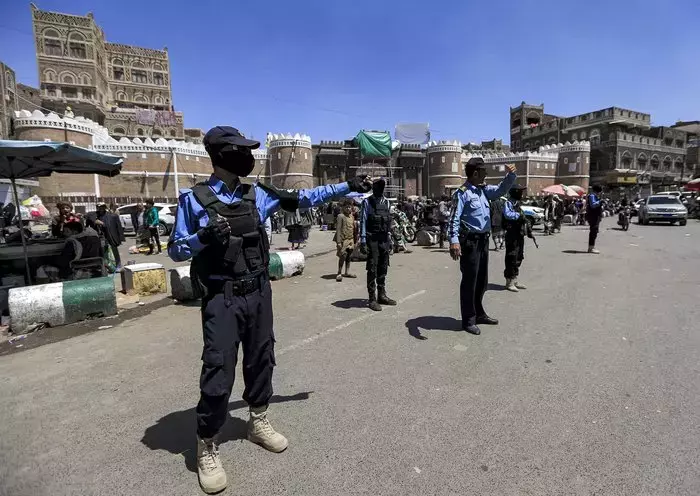
Traffic police outside of the Old City of Sanaa

Considering Yemen's size, its road transportation system is extremely limited. Yemen has 71,300 kilometers of roads, only 6,200 kilometers of which are paved. In the north, roads connecting Sanaa, Taizz, and Al Hudaydah are in good condition, as is the intercity bus system. In the south, on the other hand, roads are in need of repair, except for the Aden–Taizz road.

In November 2005, the World Bank approved a US$40 million project to upgrade 200 kilometers of intermediate rural roads and 75 kilometers of village-access roads as part of a larger effort to strengthen Yemen's rural-road planning and engineering capabilities. Plans are underway to build an estimated US$1.6 billion highway linking Aden (in the south) and Amran (in the north). The road will include more than 10 tunnels and halve the travel time between the southern coast and the northern border with Saudi Arabia.

Travel by road in Yemen is often unsafe. Within cities, minivans and small buses ply somewhat regular routes, picking up and dropping off passengers with little regard for other vehicles. Taxis and public transportation are available but often lack safety precautions. Despite the presence of traffic lights and traffic policemen, the U.S. Embassy advises drivers to exercise extreme caution, especially at intersections.

While traffic laws do exist, they are not always enforced. Drivers sometimes drive on the left side of the road, although right-hand driving is specified by Yemeni law. No laws mandate the use of seat belts or car seats for children. The maximum speed for private cars is 100 kilometers per hour (62.5 miles per hour), but speed limits are rarely enforced. Furthermore, there are many underage drivers in Yemen. Many vehicles are in poor repair and lack basic parts such as functional turn signals, headlights, and taillights. Pedestrians, especially children, and animals are a hazard in both rural and urban areas. Beyond main intercity roads, which are usually paved, the rural roads generally necessitate four-wheel-drive vehicles or vehicles with high clearance.

The British government has a clear warning for their military and civilian employees, or British tourists, about using the roads in Yemen: “In the event of a breakdown of law and order access routes in and out of major cities may be blocked. If you wish to drive outside Sanaa you will need prior permission from the Yemen Tourist Police. Travel permits may take at least 24 hours to be issued and are easiest to obtain through a travel agent. Travel without such permission is likely to result in detention and possible deportation. You should be aware that the consular assistance we can offer outside Sanaa is limited due to restrictions on travel. There have been disturbances in Aden, Lahij and al-Dhali’, which have resulted in closures of the Aden-Sanaa road. These have been short-lived but if you intend to travel by road you should check that the road is open before starting your journey. You can drive in Yemen on an International Driving Permit. Driving standards are poor and mountain roads hazardous. You should avoid all road travel outside the main cities at night. Care should also be taken to avoid minefields left over from Yemen's civil wars. Travelling off well-used tracks without an experienced guide could be extremely hazardous, particularly in parts of the south and the central highlands."

== Railways ==
Yemen does not have any railways, despite several proposals. At the beginning of the 20th century, the Ottoman Empire suggested that the Hejaz railway be extended to Yemen, but this never materialized. In 1916 the Royal Engineers built a metre gauge railway from Ma'alla in Aden to Sheikh 'Othman. This was later extended to El Khudad, a total distance of 29 miles (47 km). The line was operated by the North Western Railway of India until it closed in 1929. More recently, in 2005, the Yemeni government began to investigate rail connections as part of an overall initiative to upgrade its transportation infrastructure. In 2008 the Gulf Cooperation Council announced that it had agreed to include Yemen in plans for an integrated regional rail system and launched feasibility studies. Yemen has expressed preference for a coastal route beginning in Aden.

== Ports and merchant marine ==
Yemen's main ports are Aden, Hodeidah, Mukalla, and Mokha; Aden is the primary port. In addition, Ras Isa serves as the loading point for oil exports, and a small amount of cargo passes through Nishtun.

Facilities at Aden consist of the Maalla Terminal and the Aden Container Terminal (ACT), which opened in March 1999. The port can handle ro-ro ships, container ships, cargo ships, as well as tankers. In November 2003, following the October 2002 bombing of the French supertanker Limburg off the Yemen coast and the resultant dramatic drop in throughput at the Aden port, the Port of Singapore Authority sold its majority stake in the ACT back to the Yemeni government. In June 2005, Dubai Ports International was selected to manage and operate the ACT (and possibly Maalla Terminal) under a 30-year or longer contract; the Yemeni government will remain a minority shareholder. The Port of Aden has recovered well from the 2002 bombing. In 2004 it had annual traffic of approximately 2,000 vessels and 318,901 twenty-foot-equivalent units of containers, mostly handled by the ACT. For 2005, the port handled 317,897 twenty-foot-equivalent units of containers, more than double the amount for 2003. For the first seven months of 2006, the port handled 207, 687 twenty-foot-equivalent units of containers. However, in May 2006 the London insurance market's Joint War Committee placed Yemen on its list of “areas of perceived enhanced risk,” which is expected to add a war-risk insurance premium to ships operating in the country's coastal waters. This added premium, coupled with the availability of more secure ports in neighboring countries, will likely result in reduced throughput in Yemen's ports in the near future.

There are 3 ships (1,000 gross tonnage (GT) or over) totaling 12,059 GT/18,563 tonnes deadweight (DWT) (one cargo ship and 2 petroleum tankers) (1999 est.).

The International Maritime Bureau reports offshore waters in the Gulf of Aden are high risk for piracy; numerous vessels, including commercial shipping and pleasure craft, have been attacked and hijacked both at anchor and while underway; crew, passengers, and cargo are held for ransom; the presence of several naval task forces in the Gulf of Aden and additional anti-piracy measures on the part of ship operators reduced the incidence of piracy in that body of water by more than half in 2010.

The Yemen Coast Guard was established in 2002. According to the US Coast Guard website, they helped the Yemen Coast Guard with their patrol boats: “US Coast Guard Awards Contract to Build Two 87-foot Protector-class Coastal Patrol Boats for the Yemen Coast Guard. September 11, 2009. The Coast Guard awarded a $28.2 million contract to Bollinger Shipyards, Inc., in Lockport, La., on September 11, 2009, to build two 87-foot Protector-class Coastal Patrol Boats for the Yemen Coast Guard. The Office of International Acquisition (CG-922) at the U.S. Coast Guard (USCG) received a request from the Navy International Programs Office (IPO) to procure these boats on May 13, 2009. The USCG anticipates the delivery to Yemen in August 2011. This procurement is the latest in a series of projects, which further strengthen the longstanding relationship between the US Coast Guard and the Yemen Coast Guard. Since 2003, the USCG has delivered eight 44-foot Motor Life Boats, twelve 25-foot Defender Response Boats, and four 42-foot Fast Response Boats (SPC-NLB) to the Yemen Coast Guard. The USCG has also provided 26 mobile training team visits and 54 resident training slots in USCG schools to the Yemen Coast Guard.”

Yemen also has some lighthouses that are maintained for sea navigation by the Yemen Ports Authority, an extension of the “Port of Aden.”

== Inland Waterways ==
Yemen has no waterways of any significant length.

== Civil Aviation and Airports ==
Yemen has 57 airports, 17 of which have paved runways. Of the 57 airports, 5 are international: Aden International, Sanaa International, Taizz, Rayyan, and Al Hudaydah. A major reconstruction and expansion of Aden International was completed in 2001, including a new runway that can handle large, long-haul aircraft. Plans to make that airport a regional cargo hub, with an "air cargo village" by 2004 appear to have failed. Although construction began in January 2003, by the end of the year the managing company had dissolved.

Yemenia is the national airline; in 1996 it absorbed South Yemen, the former national carrier. It is expected that Yemenia, which is currently 49 percent owned by the Saudi Arabian government and 51 percent owned by the Yemen government, will eventually be privatized, but there has been resistance from the Saudis. In 2001 the airline carried 858,000 passengers. Because the airline's existing fleet of 12 airplanes is rapidly becoming outdated, in 2002 three new aircraft were leased for eight years, and in early 2006 the airline announced plans to acquire six new aircraft, with options for an additional four, beginning in 2012.

=== Airports - with paved runways ===
total: 17
10,000 ft (3,000 m) and over: 4
8,000 to 9,999 ft (2,438 to 3,048 m): 9
5,000 to 7,000 ft (1,500 to 2,100 m): 3
3,000 to 4,999 ft (914 to 1,524 m): 1 (2012)

=== Airports - with unpaved runways ===
total: 40
10,000 ft (3,000 m) and over: 3
8,000 to 9,999 ft (2,438 to 3,048 m): 5
5,000 to 7,000 ft (1,500 to 2,100 m): 7
3,000 to 4,999 ft (914 to 1,524 m): 16
under 3,000 ft (910 m): 9 (2012)

== Pipelines ==
According to the U.S. government, as of 2010 Yemen had a total of 1,262 kilometers of pipeline. This total includes pipeline designed for gas (88 kilometers) and oil (1,174 kilometers).

oil 1367 km
gas 423 km
petroleum products: 22 km

== See also ==
- Yemen Gulf of Aden Ports Corporation
- Yemen Red Sea Ports Corporation
- Yemen Arabian Sea Ports Corporation
- Yemen

== Bibliography ==
- Hadden, Robert Lee. 2012. The Geology of Yemen: An Annotated Bibliography of Yemen's Geology, Geography and Earth Science. Alexandria, VA: US Army Corps of Engineers, Army Geospatial Center.
