= Israeli attack on Yemen =

Israeli attack on Yemen may refer to:

- 20 July 2024 Israeli attack on Yemen
- 29 September 2024 Israeli attacks on Yemen
- 26 December 2024 Israeli attack on Yemen
- 2025 Israeli attacks in Yemen
- 10 January 2025 Israeli attack on Yemen
- May 2025 Israeli attacks on Yemen
- August 2025 Israeli attack on Sanaa
- September 2025 Israeli attacks in Yemen
