= Airstrikes in Yemen =

Airstrikes in Yemen may refer to:

- United States intervention in Yemen, United States drone strikes in Yemen in 2002 and from 2009–2025
- Saudi-led airstrikes on Yemen, 2015–2019
- US–UK airstrikes on Yemen, 2024–2025
  - 30 May 2024 attacks on Yemen
  - March–May 2025 United States attacks in Yemen
- July 2024 Houthi–Israel attacks
- 29 September 2024 Israeli attacks on Yemen
- December 2024 Israeli airstrikes in Yemen
- 2025 Israeli attacks in Yemen
  - 10 January 2025 Israeli attack on Yemen
  - August 2025 Israeli attack on Sanaa
  - September 2025 Israeli attacks in Yemen
