= Timeline of the Red Sea crisis (2024) =

These are monthly timelines for the year 2024 of the Red Sea crisis, which began on 19 October 2023.

== January 2024 ==
On 4 January, just hours after the warning, Houthis launched an unmanned surface vessel (USV) towards US Navy and commercial vessels, but it detonated well over 1 nautical mile (1.9 km; 1.2 mi) from the ships.

On 7 January, the Houthi movement stated that retaliatory attacks against the US Navy would continue unless the US handed over the Navy service members who killed the 10 Houthi attack boat personnel for them to stand trial in Yemen. On 7 January, the Pakistan Navy deployed two Tughril-class frigates, PNS Tughril and Taimur in the Arabian Sea following "recent incidents of maritime security."

On 10 January, a large-scale attack was initiated by the Houthis against USS Dwight D. Eisenhower, USS Gravely, USS Laboon, USS Mason and HMS Diamond, in which at least 21 UAVs and missiles were launched.

On 11 January, US Navy SEALs raided a ship off the coast of Somalia which was bound for the Houthi militants. Iranian-made missile components and other weapons, including air defense parts, were seized from the ship. The ship was then sunk and its crew of 14 people detained. During the raid, a SEAL was pushed into the water by high waves and one of his teammates jumped in after him, causing both of them to go missing. Both SEALs were declared dead by the US military after a 10-day search failed to locate them.

On 12 January, the US and UK conducted airstrikes against over a dozen Houthi targets in Yemen with the support of multiple other countries, just hours after the group's leader vowed that any American attack on its forces would "not go without a response". The strikes were the first time Houthi targets in Yemen were targeted since the beginning of the Red Sea crisis. More than 150 munitions and Tomahawk missiles struck 28 locations within Houthi-controlled areas. The Houthis said five of their fighters were killed and six others were injured. A day later, the US performed another strike on a Houthi radar site in Sanaa. On 14 January, American and British airstrikes were reported in Hodeida, and spy planes were reportedly spotted near the area. Reports also suggested that Israel was involved in the attacks. The US issued a denial the same day.

On 14 January, Houthis fired an anti-ship cruise missile from Hodeida in the direction of USS Laboon. The missile was shot down by a fighter jet before it could cause damage.

US Forces and allies conduct joint strikes in Yemen, 22 January 2024

On 16 January, the US struck four Houthi anti-ship ballistic missiles as they were being prepared to target ships in the Red Sea. The following day, a fourth round of US strikes hit 14 missiles across Houthi-controlled areas. On 22 January, in the eighth round of strikes against Houthis, the US and UK conducted airstrikes against eight Houthi targets in the vicinity of Sanaa airfield.

On 21 January 2024, the French frigate Alsace joined defence operations in the Red Sea after transiting through the Suez Canal, reinforcing French assets deployed in the area in the face of Houthi attacks against international shipping.

On 24 January, Houthi claimed to have attacked US destroyers and other warships in the Red Sea. This attack supposed to be in response to Operation Poseidon Archer. Houthi claimed to have directly hit a US destroyer with a missile during the attack. This attack was denied by the United States government.

On the night of 26 to 27 January, the French frigate Alsace came to the aid of an oil tanker on fire in the Gulf of Aden, alongside Indian and American destroyers INS Visakhapatnam and USS Carney. The fire suffered by the Marlin Luanda tanker was caused by a missile fired from Yemen. It was brought under control after 20 hours, with no casualties sustained.

On 29 January, Danish frigate HDMS Iver Huitfeldt departed from the Korsør naval base for the Red Sea to assist the US-led coalition in safeguarding commercial traffic against Houthi attacks. On 31 January, top European Union diplomat Josep Borrell announced that the bloc plans to start a naval mission to protect merchant shipping in the Red Sea within the following three weeks, and officials stated that seven EU member states were prepared to provide military equipment. An adviser to Borrell stated that the mission's launch date should be 19 February. Borrell added that the mission would be called 'Aspides', which translates to 'protector'.

== February 2024 ==
On 2 February, the Houthis claimed that they had fired a ballistic missile towards Eilat. The IDF also said that the Arrow defense system intercepted a missile over the Red Sea. On 3 February, a day after conducting airstrikes in Iraq and Syria, the US and UK conducted strikes against 36 Houthi sites, which included underground facilities, UAV storage and operation sites, missile systems, radars, and helicopters in 13 different locations across Houthi-controlled parts of Yemen in an attempt to degrade their capabilities. Houthi official Mohammed Al-Bukhaiti stated that they would "meet escalation with escalation" in response to the bombings.

On 8 February, the German frigate Hessen departed from Wilhelmshaven for the Red Sea with about 240 people on board in order to assist the upcoming EU mission.

On 10 February, Houthi official media listed the names of 17 fighters that were killed during joint US–UK strikes. The announcement came following public funerals held in Sanaa.

On 15 February, the US Army announced that the Coast Guard seized a vessel originating from Iran and was bound for Houthi-controlled Yemen on 28 January. The US Army said the vessel was carrying advanced weapons and other "lethal aid". It had more than 200 packages containing ballistic missile and naval drone components, explosives, communications gear, and anti-tank missile launcher parts.

On 19 February, the European Union announced the start of the naval mission Operation Aspides, which plans to send warships and provide early airborne warning systems to the Red Sea and surrounding waters. The launch was confirmed by Italian Foreign Affairs Minister Antonio Tajani. France, Germany, Italy and Belgium all announced their intention to contribute to the operation. Operation Aspides will be headquartered in Larissa, Greece. The operation is not allowed to attack pre-emptively, and will only fire on Houthis if they attack first. The operation will only operate at sea, and will not conduct or participate in military strikes. The same day, Houthis claimed they shot down an MQ-9 Reaper drone over the Red Sea. US officials confirmed the incident, adding that the drone belonged to the US Air Force and crashed off the coast of Hodeidah.

On 20 February, France announced that one of its warships shot down two Houthi UAVs over the Red Sea, while CENTCOM announced the downing of ten bomb-carrying drones and a cruise missile targeting USS Laboon. Houthis claimed that they attacked Eilat and a number of American warships in the Red Sea and Arabian Sea with drones.

On the morning of 22 February, two UAVs targeting commercial vessels in the Red Sea were stated to have been intercepted yet again by one of the French FREMM frigates in the area. Later that day, the Houthis' Humanitarian Operations Coordination Center sent statements to shipping insurers and firms announcing a formal ban on vessels owned or partially owned by Israeli, British, or American entities or individuals in the Red Sea, Gulf of Aden, and Arabian Sea. The ban also included vessels sailing under the flags of the mentioned nations. The statement came as the Houthis launched drones and ballistic missiles targeting Eilat and an American destroyer in the Red Sea, though none of them struck their target according to authorities. However, the Houthis successfully fired two missiles at a Palau-flagged cargo ship named Islander which sparked a fire and wounded one sailor on board the vessel, though the ship continued its transportation route. Houthi leader Abdul-Malik al-Houthi also said in a statement that operations in the Red Sea and surrounding waters were continuing, escalating and effective, and announced the introduction of "submarine weapons" without giving further details.

On 24 February, the US and UK conducted their fourth round of joint airstrikes, hitting 18 Houthi targets across eight locations. The British Ministry of Defense said that four Royal Air Force Typhoon fighter jets, supported by two Voyager tankers, participated in the strikes. The Houthis' official news agency said the attacks killed a civilian and injured eight others, making them the first civilian casualties during US and British airstrikes.

On 26 February, damages were reported to Red Sea undersea communications cables. Initial reports by industry sources, African press, and Israeli press, tied this to Houthi attacks that was predicted by international press, while Seacom was unable to confirm the cause, they later confirmed the location of the damage to be in Yemeni maritime jurisdictions. Press releases by Seacom and Flag Telecom were describing the difficulty of repair due to the crisis in shipping. Houthi leaders denied involvement. The same day, Greece approved a decision to send the Greek frigate Hydra to the Red Sea to assist Operation Aspides. Also on 26 February, the German frigate Hessen launched two SM-2 missiles at an American Reaper drone in a friendly fire incident. The missiles missed their target, falling into the sea.

On 27 February, Houthi leader Mohammed al-Houthi said they will only allow a salvage operation to take place if humanitarian aid is sent to Gaza Strip. On the same day, German frigate Hessen intercepted two Houthi drones as they targeted the naval vessel, making it the German Navy's first naval engagement of Operation Aspides. The Hessen downed one drone with her 76mm cannon and a second with her CIWS system. The Rubymar, which was struck by the Houthis earlier in February started sinking while drifting northwards and sank by 2 March 2024.

== March 2024 ==
On 2 March, during Operation Aspides, the Italian destroyer Caio Duilio shot down a Houthi missile over the Red Sea. The missile was within 4 miles (6.4 km) of the destroyer before it was shot down.

On 4 March, Houthi Telecommunications Minister Misfer Al-Numair said that vessels entering Yemeni waters would need a permit from the Houthi-controlled Maritime Affairs Authority.

On 4 March 2024, INS Kolkata, deployed to the Gulf of Aden, responded to a request from MSC Sky II, a Liberian flagged container vessel, that had reportedly been attacked by a drone or missile, at about 1900 h (IST) on 4 March, 90 nautical miles (170 km; 100 mi) southeast of Aden. The ship's master reported smoke and flames onboard following the attack. INS Kolkata was quickly redirected to provide the required support, and by 2230 hours (IST), it had reached the incident site. Kolkata then escorted the ship from the area of the incident into the territorial seas of Djibouti at the master's request. Early on 5 March, a 12-person specialised firefighting team from Kolkata boarded the Sky II and extinguished the remaining fires. In addition, an explosive ordnance disposal team boarded MSC Sky II to evaluate residual risk. The 23-person crew, 13 of whom were citizens of India, were safe, and the ship continued sailing towards its next destination.

On 8 March, Finland announced they will send up to five officers to the European-led Operation Aspides and up to two soldiers to take part in the US-led Operation Prosperity Guardian. The Royal Netherlands Navy also confirmed the same day that it would be sending HNLMS Tromp to the Red Sea. The frigate would be a part of Operation Prosperity Guardian but also support Operation Aspides. The frigate is manned with 200 sailors. She has a NH90 maritime attack helicopter on board and is equipped to intercept incoming missiles and drones. The Netherlands also announced its intent to send a joint logistics support vessel to the Red Sea in the following month.

On 9 March, the French FREMM Alsace patrolling the Gulf of Aden under the newly launched EU Aspides mission, as well as French Mirage 2000-5 stationed in Djibouti, intercepted four Houthi UAVs threatening commercial transit that day.

On 11 March, the US and UK conducted 17 airstrikes against port cities and towns under Houthi control in Western Yemen. Among the targets struck were Hodeidah and the port of Ras Isa. A spokesperson for the internationally recognized Yemeni government said the strikes killed 11 people and injured 14 others.

On 12 March, the Italian Ministry of Defense reported that Caio Duilio had shot down two Houthi drones in self-defense.

On 14 March, the Russian state news agency RIA Novosti reported that the Houthis claimed to have a hypersonic missile, citing an unnamed official and no evidence.

On 18 March, Yemeni Houthis launched a cruise missile that successfully struck Israel, reportedly hitting an open area north of Eilat. Israel stated there was no damage or injuries caused.

On 20 March, the embarked Panther helicopter from Alsace shot down a Houthi UAV flying towards commercial vessels over the southern Red Sea. The door gunner of the helicopter, which was patrolling in the area, engaged and destroyed the UAV with a 7.62 mm machine gun. The same day, a US Navy sailor assigned to USS Mason went missing while conducting supporting operations in the Red Sea. On 23 March, the US Department of Defense declared him as dead, stating that his death occurred in a non-combat incident.

On the morning of 21 March, the embarked helicopter of the German frigate Hessen destroyed a seaborne drone (USV) in the Red Sea. Later that day, the French Alsace, providing close protection to merchant shipping in the area, engaged and destroyed three Houthi ballistic missiles threatening the transit with its Aster 30 missiles. The same day, Bloomberg had reported that the Houthis reached a deal with Russia and China, agreeing to provide safe passage for vessels under their jurisdiction in exchange for political support. The IDF also announced on the same day that it intercepted a "suspicious aerial target" approaching Israeli territory over the Red Sea.

On 27 March, the US Navy said it shot down four Houthi UAVs targeting warships in the Red Sea. The following day, several Russian Pacific Fleet warships navigated into the Red Sea via the Bab al-Mandeb Strait, including the Russian cruiser Varyag and frigate Marshal Shaposhnikov according to Zvezda. This was reportedly after the Houthis made a political deal with Russia and China, allowing them safe passage possibly in exchange for blocking resolutions at the UN Security Council.

== April 2024 ==
On 3 April, Danish chief of defense Flemming Lentfer was fired after failing to report flaws regarding air defenses and weapons systems aboard the frigate Ivar Huitfeldt which emerged after a Houthi attack in March, when the frigate's air defenses failed while engaging with Houthis. A problem also occurred with the frigate's ammunition system, which caused half of the rounds it fired to detonate before hitting their target.

In April, Tim Lenderking, the United States special envoy for Yemen, stated that he hoped to achieve a diplomatic solution with the Yemeni Houthis in regard to their attacks, and that the US would consider removing the Houthis from its designated terrorist list if they ceased their attacks.

On 9 April, the IDF used a seaborne missile from INS Magen to shoot down a UAV for the first time. The UAV, which came from the Red Sea, breached Israeli airspace and crossed into the area of the Gulf of Aqaba, setting off sirens in Eilat.

On 10 April, the US military said it destroyed eleven drones belonging to the Houthis which it said presented a threat to US, coalition, and merchant vessels. Eight of the drones were destroyed in Houthi-controlled territory, while three were shot down; two over the Gulf of Aden and another over the Red Sea.

On 13 April, the Houthis in coordination with Iran launched several drones at Israel amidst the Iranian strikes against Israel, according to the maritime security agency Ambrey. The organization said that the target of the drones are potentially Israeli ports, and that collateral damage to shipping is likely. The following day, the IDF's C-Dome system intercepted an aerial target in the Eilat area, which came from the direction of the Red Sea.

On 18 April, the Iranian spy ship MV Behshad, which is suspected of assisting the Houthis, left its position at sea and started to sail towards the port of Bandar Abbas.

On 25 April, a Greek frigate intercepted two Houthi drones in the Red Sea.

On 26 April, the Houthis said they shot down an American MQ-9 Reaper drone off the coast of Yemen. The US confirmed the crash of an MQ-9 Reaper in the area and launched an investigation into it.

== May 2024 ==
In early May, Houthi-run Saba News Agency reported that at least 18 people were arrested on suspicions of spying for the US and Israel. According to Saba, the supposed spy network was formed in November. Saba did not provide evidence to support the claim, but said that the men had confessed to spying.

On 3 May 2024, the Houthi-aligned Yemeni Armed Forces SPC military spokesperson Yahya Saree announced the expansion of their campaign to the targeting of ships in the eastern Mediterranean bound for Israel. in a televised speech, Saree stated that "We will target any ships heading to Israeli ports in the Mediterranean Sea in any area we are able to reach".

On 7 May, USS Dwight D. Eisenhower returned to Red Sea after a short port call in late April at Souda Bay, Crete to resupply.

On 10 May, a coalition warplane intercepted a Houthi drone over the Gulf of Aden. The following day, three other drones were intercepted over the Red Sea. No casualties or damage to shipping were reported in both incidents.

On 15 May, the Houthis claimed to have shot down a MQ-9 Reaper drone near Marib, later releasing footage of its purported downing. The US military however declined to comment. On 21 May, the Houthis claimed to have shot down another MQ-9 Reaper drone, stating it crashed in Al Bayda Governorate.

On 29 May, the Houthis claimed that they shot down an MQ-9 Reaper drone with a surface-to-air missile over Marib province. Footage obtained by the Associated Press displayed a damaged drone, but it remained mostly intact and lacked signs of blast damage. It also lacked markings, and the downing was not acknowledged by local authorities. Associated Press reported that a USAF official denied the loss of aircraft on the theater, meanwhile the CIA that operates those drones refused to comment.

On 30 May, the US and UK conducted strikes against 13 Houthi targets across Yemen, killing 16 people and injuring 42 others. The Houthis on the next day threatened to escalate their attacks in response and claimed to have targeted USS Dwight D. Eisenhower with drones and ballistic missiles. An American defence official told The Associated Press that the ship was in fine condition. The US Central Command meanwhile reported that the Houthis launched two anti-ship ballistic missiles and a drone over the Gulf of Aden, with the drone being intercepted and the missiles not causing any damage. In addition, it stated that they also launched four drones over the Red Sea, with three being intercepted and one crashing into the water.

== June 2024 ==
The Houthis targeted USS Dwight D. Eisenhower, USS Gravely, and three commercial vessels on 1 June. The US Central Command confirmed the attacks, while adding that no casualties or damage was reported, with one drone being intercepted in the southern Red Sea and two others crashing into the water. It also added that it had shot down two anti-ship ballistic missiles targeting USS Gravely.

On 3 June, the IDF's Arrow defense system intercepted a surface-to-air missile aimed at Eilat from the direction of the Red Sea. The Houthis later claimed that they were targeting an IDF site with a ballistic missile named Palestine. On 6 June, the group and the Islamic Resistance in Iraq claimed to have launched two coordinated attacks on Haifa. Israel however denied these claims. The Houthis later stated that they would intensify their joint operations with the Islamic Resistance in Iraq.

On 6 June, at least eleven Yemeni UN workers were arrested by the Houthis. Four days later, the group claimed that they had arrested an undisclosed number of members of an "American-Israeli spy network" that disguised itself as international and UN organizations, and aired purported confessions from ten Yemenis, claiming that several of them were recruited by the U.S. Embassy in Yemen. None of the people in the taped confessions however were among the UN workers arrested four days earlier.

The Houthi-run Al-Masirah television channel on 7 June reported that the US and the UK had carried out four airstrikes on the Hodeida International Airport and the Port of Salif, in addition to two airstrikes on the al-Thawra region to the north of Sana'a. No casualties were reported, while neither the US and UK confirmed the attacks. Separately, the US Armed Forces stated that they had destroyed a drone in the Bab-el-Mandeb strait launched from the Houthi-ruled area and a Houthi patrol boat in the Red Sea.

The Houthis on 9 June claimed to have targeted the British destroyer HMS Diamond in the Red Sea with ballistic missiles. The British Ministry of Defence however denied the claim as untrue.

CNN on 11 June published a report citing three American officials stating that American intelligence agencies believed the Houthis were discussing amongst themselves about arming the Somali militant group Al-Shabaab, and officials were investigating whether any weapon deliveries had been made or if Iran was involved. The U.S. Central Command meanwhile stated that the U.S. military had destroyed two missile launchers used by the Houthis.

On 12 June, the Houthis claimed joint attacks with the Islamic Resistance in Iraq on sites in Ashdod and Haifa. On 13 June, the U.S. Central Command stated that it had destroyed two Houthi patrol boats, an unmanned surface vessel and a drone in the Red Sea over the past day. The Houthis meanwhile stated that the U.S. and UK had carried out two airstrikes on the government complex in the Al Jabin district of the Raymah Governorate, killing two people and wounding nine. The group also claimed that the two countries had carried out 22 airstrikes on Sanaa, Al Hudaydah and Raymah governorates over the past week.

On 15 June, the US Central Command stated that its military had destroyed seven Houthi radar systems in Yemen that enabled the group to locate and target merchant vessels. It also claimed that a Houthi UAV and two USVs in the Red Sea were destroyed simultaneously. The Houthis claimed to have targeted an American destroyer on the next day.

On 17 June, Al-Masirah reported that the US and the UK had carried out at least six airstrikes on the Hodeida International Airport and four on the island of Kamaran. Associated Press journalists who were given an on-board tour of USS Dwight D. Eisenhower meanwhile found no signs of damage. Al-Masirah on 19 June claimed that the US and the UK carried out three airstrikes on sites located in Al-Taif area of Ad Durayhimi district in Al Hudaydah Governorate, and four airstrikes on the government complex in Al Jabin district of Raymah Governorate.

The Houthis on 22 June again claimed to have targeted USS Dwight D. Eisenhower in the Red Sea, but Reuters cited two U.S. officials who denied the claim. The ship meanwhile ended its tour and was ordered to return home, being replaced by USS Theodore Roosevelt. The US Central Command also stated that it had destroyed three Houthi uncrewed surface vessels in the Red Sea over the past day, while the Houthis had also fired three anti-ship ballistic missiles over the Gulf of Aden, but none of the military or commercial vessels reported any casualties or significant damage.

On 23 June, the Houthis claimed to have carried out a joint attack with the Islamic Resistance in Iraq on four ships in the Haifa port. There was however no confirmation from the IDF or independent sources. The U.S. Central Command on 28 June stated that its forces had destroyed seven drones and a UAV ground control station in Houthi-controlled territory over the past day.

== July 2024 ==
The Houthis on 2 July stated that they had carried out a joint operation with the Islamic Resistance in Iraq, claiming to have attacked a "vital target" in Haifa with a number of missiles. The Operation Aspides mission stated that two UAVs were destroyed by the Greek frigate Psara in the Gulf of Aden on 7 July.

The IDF stated that it had shot down a suspected UAV heading towards Israel from the Red Sea on 8 July. The Houthis later claimed to have carried out a joint attack along with the Islamic Resistance in Iraq on Eilat using a number of drones.

On 7 July 2024, the port of Eilat's CEO said there had been no activity at the port in the past eight months, and he was requesting financial assistance from the Israeli government. A few days later the CEO said the port was in a state of bankruptcy.

Al-Masirah stated that the U.S. and the U.K. on 11 July launched five airstrikes, hitting targets in the Ras Isa area located to the northwest of Al Hudaydah. The U.S. Central Command meanwhile stated that it destroyed five Houthi USVs and two UAVs in the Red Sea, and another UAV in Houthi-controlled territory. On 12 July, it stated that it had destroyed three UAVs in Houthi-controlled territory. Al-Masirah meanwhile reported that the U.S. and U.K. had carried out three airstrikes on the Hodeida International Airport.

Al-Masirah reported on 14 July that the U.S. and U.K. carried out an airstrike in the Midi district of Hajjah Governorate, two airstrikes on the Hodeida International Airport, and also struck the al-Buhaisi area in Al Hudaydah Governorate. The Operation Aspides mission meanwhile stated that Psara shot down a suspected Houthi drone in the Gulf of Aden. The U.S. Central Command stated that the U.S. military had destroyed two Houthi UAVs and one USV in the Red Sea, in addition to destroying another UAV in territory controlled by the group. The Houthis during the day stated that they had attacked military targets in Eilat with UAVs in retaliation for the Israeli attack on Al-Mawasi the previous day.

On 15 July, the UAE-based news network Al-Ain reported that the Houthis had lost contact with a large vessel smuggling foreign personnel and missile equipment to Al Hudaydah, and had entered their third day of searching for the ship using reconnaissance UAVs and patrol ships.

On 19 July, an explosion caused by a Yemeni UAV in Tel Aviv killed one person and wounded at least ten others near the U.S. consulate. A ballistic missile and three other UAVs were also reportedly fired at the city, but were intercepted by the U.S. The Houthis later claimed responsibility for the attack, stating that they used a drone called "Jaffa" which was capable of evading radar and interception systems, and added that they would continue to target Tel Aviv as a primary target within their operational range. According to an investigation by the IDF, the UAV had initially been detected by its radar systems, but was not consistently tracked due to human error and multiple layers of radar surveillance.

On 20 July, Israel carried out several airstrikes on infrastructure in Al Hudaydah, with Al Masirah reporting that Israeli jets targeted oil refining facilities at the Hudaydah Port and a power plant, killing at least three people and wounding 87 others, while IDF stated that it had struck a facility used for storing and distributing weapons. More than 220 projectiles had been launched by the Houthis on Israel by 20 July according to the IDF.

On 21 July, the IDF stated that it had intercepted a surface-to-surface missile launched from Yemen. Rocket and missile sirens meanwhile sounded in Eilat, however the IDF said that the city was not targeted and denied reports of an explosion. The Houthis claimed that they had targeted Eilat with several missiles. Al-Masirah meanwhile reported that the U.S. and the U.K. had carried out two airstrikes on Buhais area in Hajjah Governorate and four airstrikes on Ras Isa in Al Hudaydah Governorate.

Abdul-Malik al-Houthi on 21 July stated that the Israeli airstrikes would lead to an escalation of Houthi attacks on Israel, adding that they would continue supporting Palestinians and would move to a new level of attacks in future. The group described the attack on Tel Aviv as the beginning of the fifth phase of their attacks.

Al-Masirah on 26 July reported that the U.S. and the U.K. carried out four airstrikes on Kamaran island. On the next day, it reported that the two countries had carried out four airstrikes on the Hodeida International Airport, which according to residents struck Houthi targets.

CNN reported in August 2024 that Russia was planning to ship weapons to Houthis in late-July 2024, in retaliation for the US supporting Ukraine during Russia's invasion of the country, but refrained from doing after being warned by Saudi Arabia, who was also requested by the US to pressure Russia.

== August 2024 ==
On 3 August, the US Central Command announced that US forces had destroyed a Houthi missile and launcher. The group later stated that it had shot down a MQ-9 Reaper drone in the Saada Governorate, publishing a video purportedly showing its wreckage. The US Defense Department stated that it was investigating the claim.

On 5 August, the US Central Command stated that the US military had destroyed three Houthi UAVs over the Gulf of Aden; a UAV in Houthi-controlled territory; and a UAV, a USV and an anti-ship ballistic missile in the Red Sea. On the following day, it stated that the US military had destroyed one Houthi UAV and two anti-ship ballistic missiles over the Red Sea.

On 7 August, the Houthis stated that they had targeted the U.S. destroyers USS Cole and USS Laboon; however, a U.S. official denied the claim. The US Central Command meanwhile stated that American forces had destroyed two Houthi UAVs, a ground control station and three antiship cruise missiles in the territory controlled by Houthis over the past day. It also stated that the group was mounting a campaign of disinformation to foment unrest in the region.

On 8 August, the US Central Command said that the US forces destroyed two Houthi antiship cruise missiles and a ground control station in Houthi-controlled territory, as well as a Houthi USV in the Red Sea over the past day. Al-Masirah on 12 August reported that a UAV operated by the US-led coalition carried out an airstrike on Kamaran island.

On 14 August, the US Central Command announced that the US military had destroyed two Houthi vessels over the past day. Al-Masirah on 15 August reported that the US and the UK carried out an airstrike on As Salif district. The US Central Command meanwhile stated that the US military had destroyed a Houthi ground control station in territory controlled by the group.

On 16 August, the US Central Command said that the US military had destroyed a Houthi USV in the Red Sea over the past day. On 18 August, it stated that the US military had destroyed a Houthi UAV in the area controlled by the group over the past day. Al-Masirah on 21 August stated that the US and the UK had carried out three airstrikes in the As Salif district.

On 21 August, the US Central Command stated that the US forces had destroyed a Houthi radar system and surface-to-air missile in the area controlled by Houthis. On the following day, it stated that the US military had destroyed two Houthi UAVs over the Red Sea and another in Houthi-controlled territory. A French destroyer which was part of the Operation Aspides mission meanwhile destroyed a Houthi USV targeting the drifting oil tanker Sounion.

On 23 August, the US Central Command stated that the US forces had destroyed a Houthi missile system in Houthi-controlled territory. On 29 August it stated that the US forces had destroyed a Houthi missile system and UAV over the past day in territory controlled by the group. On the following day, it stated that the US forces had destroyed two Houthi UAVs in territory controlled by the group. On 31 August, it stated that US forces had destroyed a Houthi UAV and USV in territory controlled by the group.

== September 2024 ==
On 2 September, the US Central Command stated that the US forces had destroyed two Houthi missile systems in Houthi-controlled territory over the past day. On the following day, it stated that the US forces had destroyed another Houthi missile system. On 7 September, it stated that the US forces had destroyed a Houthi UAV and a support vehicle in Houthi-controlled territory over the past day.

On 8 September, the Houthis claimed that they destroyed a US MQ-9 Reaper drone over the Marib Governorate. Al-Masirah meanwhile reported that multiple air strikes were carried out by the US-led coalition in the vicinity of Ibb. The US Central Command meanwhile stated that the US forces had destroyed three Houthi UAVs and two missile systems in Houthi-controlled territory over the past day. On the following day, Al-Masirah reported that the U.S. and U.K.-led coalition carried out airstrikes which struck a location in the al-Jabanah area of Al Hudaydah.

On 10 September, the US Central Command stated that the US forces had destroyed two Houthi missile systems and a support vehicle in Houthi-controlled territory, as well as a Houthi UAV above the Red Sea over the past day. The Houthis meanwhile claimed that they had shot down another US MQ-9 Reaper drone over the Saada Governorate. Al-Masirah claimed that an airstrike by the US and UK-led coalition struck a suspected military base near a girls' school in Al-Janad area of Taiz Governorate, causing a stampede which killed two students and injured at least ten others.

On 11 September, the US Central Command stated that the US forces had destroyed five Houthi UAVs and two missile systems in Houthi-controlled territory over the past day. Al-Masirah meanwhile reported that the US and UK-led coalition carried out two airstrikes in Al-Kamp area of Taiz Governorate.

On 12 September, the US Central Command reported that a missile system in Houthi-controlled territory was destroyed over the past day by US forces. On 14 September, it stated that three Houthi UAVs and a support vehicle in Houthi-controlled territory were destroyed over the past day by US forces.

On 15 September, the Houthis launched a ballistic missile that was partially intercepted by the Arrow defense system according to the IDF, with its fragments falling in open fields, causing a fire in an open area near Lod, and on a train station in Modi'in-Maccabim-Re'ut. The falling projectile fragments caused damage at the train station. Nine people suffered minor injuries while running to bomb shelters. More than 2,365,000 Israelis sought shelter with alerts that lasted 90 seconds in the greater Tel Aviv area.

The Houthis claimed that they had targeted an Israeli military position in the Tel Aviv district with a new hypersonic ballistic missile which the IDF failed to intercept. The US Central Command later stated that the US forces had destroyed a Houthi missile system in the territory controlled by the group over the past day.

On 16 September, the Houthis claimed that they had destroyed a US MQ-9 Reaper drone over the Dhamar Governorate. Separately, Mohammed al-Bukhaiti, a senior official of the political bureau of the Houthi movement, stated that the US had offered to accord recognition to its government in exchange for it ceasing its attacks and also made threats of intervening militarily. Two US officials however dismissed the statement as baseless in remarks to Reuters.

On 18 September, the US military confirmed that the Houthis had destroyed US MQ-9 Reaper drones on 10 and 16 September. On 21 September, the US Central Command stated that US forces had destroyed a Houthi UAV above the Red Sea over the past day. On 25 September, it stated that another Houthi UAV was destroyed above the Red Sea by US forces over the past day.

Vice-chair of the UN-recognized Yemeni government and leader of the Southern Transitional Council Aidarus al-Zoubaidi on 24 September said that the airstrikes by the coalition on the Houthis had not seriously affected their capabilities during an interview with The Guardian. He also accused Iran and Russia of supplying the group with weapons.

On 27 September, the Arrow defense system intercepted a missile from Yemen targeting central Israel. A teenager was moderately injured after being struck by a car that was pulling over to the side of a road during the attack, and seventeen others were lightly hurt from falls while on their way to shelters or due to acute anxiety. The Houthis on 27 September claimed that they targeted Tel Aviv with a ballistic missile and Ashkelon with a drone in response to Israel's attacks on Lebanon and Gaza, but the IDF stated that it was not aware of any drone entering Israel. The group also stated that they had attacked three US Navy destroyers with 23 missiles and a UAV in the Red Sea. A US official confirmed that US Navy warships intercepted multiple missiles and drones launched by the group while they were sailing through the Bab-el-Mandeb, adding that no damage was inflicted to any of the vessels.

On 28 September, the Arrow defense system shot down a ballistic missile launched from Yemen, with its remains crashing near Tzur Hadassah, causing minor damage. The Houthis stated that they had targeted Ben Gurion Airport as Netanyahu's plane arrived after returning from New York City.

On 29 September, the Israeli Air Force struck Houthi targets in Al Hudaydah and Ras Issa, including power plants and port facilities, killing at least six people and injuring 57 others according to the Houthi-controlled Health Ministry. The Houthi-run Information Ministry claimed that the group had emptied the facilities used to store fuel prior to the attack.

On 30 September, the Houthis claimed that they had shot down a US MQ-9 Reaper drone in Saada Governorate. The US military later confirmed its loss.

== October 2024 ==
On 1 October, the Houthis claimed that they had attacked a military target in Tel Aviv and Eilat with four Samed-4 UAVs. The IDF meanwhile stated that it had intercepted a UAV over the Mediterranean Sea, near the shore of central Israel.

On 2 October, the Houthis claimed to have targeted military posts deep inside Israel with three Quds-5 cruise missiles. On the following day, the IDF stated that it had shot down two UAVs near the coastline of central Israel, with another striking an open area near Bat Yam. The Houthis claimed the attacks, stating that they had successfully struck a vital target in Tel Aviv with multiple Yaffa-type UAVs.

On 4 October, the US forces carried out airstrikes against many cities in Yemen, with the US Central Command stating that it carried out fifteen airstrikes. Al-Masirah reported that four airstrikes targeted Sana'a, while seven struck Al Hudaydah, including the Hodeida International Airport. The Dhamar Governorate and Al Bayda Governorate were also struck per the Houthi media office. US officials told The Associated Press that the strikes had targeted Houthi military bases, weapon systems and other equipment. Al-Masirah meanwhile also claimed that the UK was involved in the airstrikes, an allegation which was denied by the British Ministry of Defence.

On 7 October, the Houthis claimed that they had launched two missiles at Jaffa, with the first being Palestine 2 missile that reached its target and the second was a Dhu al-Fiqar missile. The IDF stated that the Israeli Air Force had intercepted one missile launched from Yemen and aimed at Jaffa. The group also claimed to have targeted Jaffa and Eilat with several drones.

On 14 October, Al-Masirah stated that the US and UK-led coalition carried out two airstrikes in Al Hudaydah Governorate.

The United States Secretary of Defense Lloyd Austin on 16 October stated that Northrop B-2 Spirit bombers targeted five underground weapon storage facilities where Houthis stored weapons used in targeting commercial and military vessels. The US Central Command stated that there was no indication of civilians being harmed due to the attack. Al-Masirah meanwhile stated that airstrikes were carried out around Sana'a and Saada.

On 19 October, the US Central Command stated that the US military had shot down twenty kamikaze UAVs and land-attack cruise missiles launched by Houthis and other pro-Iranian militias during the past week, in addition to a Houthi surface-to-air missile launcher along with its radar. Al-Masirah meanwhile reported that the US and UK-led coalition launched airstrikes targeting Ras Issa.

On 22 October, the Houthis claimed that they had targeted an Israeli military base in the Tel Aviv area with cruise and ballistic missiles, bypassing American and Israeli defense systems. The IDF however stated that it was unaware of missiles being launched towards Israel from Yemen.

The Houthis meanwhile stated that the US and UK-led coalition targeted the Hodeidah International Airport twice with airstrikes. On 24 October, the Islamic Resistance in Iraq claimed that it carried out two attacks in northern Israel with UAVs, while also targeting a vital site in the Jordan Valley. The IDF meanwhile stated that a UAV launched from Iraq crashed into the Red Sea near Eilat.

On 29 October, the Houthis claimed that they had targeted an industrial area in Ashkelon with UAVs. The IDF confirmed that a UAV had crossed into Israeli airspace, but fell into an open area near Ashkelon.

On 31 October, Al-Masirah reported that the US and UK-led coalition had targeted the Hodeidah International Airport and the al-Hawak district of Al Hudaydah.

== November 2024 ==
On 8 November, the Houthis claimed to have shot down an American MQ-9 Reaper UAV over the Al Jawf Governorate. The US military acknowledged the videos being circulated online purportedly of the drone's debris and stated that they were investigating. The group additionally stated that it had targeted the Nevatim Airbase in Israel with a ballistic missile, but the IDF stated that it was intercepted. Al-Masirah stated that the US and UK-led coalition had launched two airstrikes in the Al Hudaydah Governorate.

On 10 November, Al-Masirah reported that US and UK-led coalition carried out airstrikes on the city of Sana'a, its suburbs, the 'Amran Governorate and other areas of Yemen. US officials confirmed the airstrikes, stating that the US forces conducted attacks on facilities utilised by Houthis for storing weapons which they used for targeting military and civilian ships. The US Central Command admitted on 13 November that it had carried out airstrikes against weapons storage facilities of the Houthis on 9 and 10 November using both the US Air Force and Navy assets, including the F-35C aircraft.

On 11 November, the Houthis claimed to have successfully targeted the Nahal Sorek military base near Jaffa, but the IDF stated that it intercepted the projectile in the Bet Shemesh area, with its debris causing fires. Al-Masirah meanwhile reported that the US and UK-led coalition carried out airstrikes in the 'Amran and Saada governorates. The Islamic Resistance in Iraq meanwhile claimed to have carried out UAV attacks on northern and southern Israel. The Houthis later attacked USS Stockdale and USS Spruance in the Bab-el-Mandeb with at least eight UAVs, five ballistic missiles, and three anti-ship cruise missiles; US officials said all were intercepted without causing any damage or casualties. The group also claimed to have targeted USS Abraham Lincoln, but US officials denied the claim.

On 12 November, Al-Masirah reported that the US and the UK-led coalition launched an air strike targeting a civilian car in the As Sawma'ah district, and three US-UK air strikes targeting the Al-Faza area in the At Tuhayta district.

On 16 November, the Houthis claimed to have targeted a site in Eilat using a number of UAVs.

On 17 November, the Houthis claimed to have targeted sites in Tel Aviv and Ashkelon area with several UAVs, but the IDF stated that it was unaware of any such attack.

The IDF intercepted a missile launched from Yemen on 21 November. The Houthis later claimed to have successfully targeted the Nevatim Airbase on November with the Palestine 2 missile.

On 28 November, Al-Masirah reported that the US and UK-led coalition had carried out two airstrikes on Bajil district.

== December 2024 ==
On 1 December, the IDF intercepted a ballistic missile launched from Yemen before it crossed into Israeli territory. The Houthis later took responsibility, stating that they attacked a vital target in central Israel. The group also claimed to have hit a US destroyer and three supply ships belonging to the US Armed Forces which they identified as Stena Impeccable, Maersk Saratoga and Liberty Grace, with sixteen ballistic and cruise missiles. The United States Central Command later stated that USS Stockdale and USS O'Kane intercepted three anti-ship ballistic missiles, three UAVs and an anti-ship cruise missile launched at them and three merchant ships.

On 2 December, the Israeli Navy stated that it had intercepted a UAV launched from Iraq over the Red Sea. The Houthis later claimed that they had carried out three UAV attacks in cooperation with the Islamic Resistance in Iraq against Israeli sites, including two in northern Israel and one in Eilat.

A missile launched from Yemen on 7 December was intercepted by Israeli air defenses before it entered Israeli territory. Another missile launched by the Houthis was shot down by the Israeli Air Force on the following day, before it entered Israeli territory. The Houthis stated that they had targeted a vital facility in southern Israel in cooperation with the Islamic Resistance in Iraq using UAVs. On 9 December, a UAV launched from Yemen damaged an apartment block in Yavne, without causing any casualties. The Houthis claimed that they had successfully hit a sensitive target in the Tel Aviv area.

On 10 December, the Houthis stated that they had targeted three supply vessels of the American military, as well as the destroyers USS O'Kane and USS Stockdale escorting them through the Gulf of Aden. The US Central Command later stated that the destroyers had intercepted all the UAVs and cruise missiles launched by the group at the ships.

The IDF intercepted a UAV targeting Eilat and launched from Yemen over the Red Sea on 12 December, while another UAV launched from the east of Israel was intercepted over southern Israel. The Houthis on the following day claimed to have successfully targeted military sites in Jaffa and Ashkelon using UAVs, in addition to conducting a UAV attack in cooperation with the Islamic Resistance in Iraq against strategic sites in southern Israel. Al-Masirah on 15 December claimed that the US and UK-led coalition carried out airstrikes targeting the At Tuhayta district.

On 16 December, the IDF intercepted a missile launched from Yemen before it crossed into Israeli territory. The Houthis claimed the attacked, stating that they had successfully targeted central Israel with the Palestine 2 missile. A UAV launched from Yemen was also intercepted over the Mediterranean Sea by the Israeli Navy. Al-Masirah meanwhile stated that the U.S. and U.K.-led coalition had carried out an airstrike on the Bahis area in the Midi district and the al-Ardi complex in Sanaa. The US Central Command later admitted that the US military had targeted a Houthi command-and-control facility. The Houthis also targeted three commercial ships and destroyers of the US Navy escorting them through the Gulf of Aden with UAVs and a missile during the day, but four UAVs and the missile were shot down by the destroyers, a US Navy helicopter and a French Air Force aircraft.

Overnight on 18 December, the Arrow defense system partially intercepted a Houthi ballistic missile before it entered Israeli airspace, the warhead however was undamaged and the shrapnel fell in Ramat Gan, with cars being damaged and a school collapsing. The Houthis claimed to have struck two military sites in the Tel Aviv area using hypersonic ballistic missiles. A suspected Houthi UAV was intercepted on the following day near the coast of Tel Aviv by the Israeli Air Force. The Houthis later claimed to have targeted a military site in the Tel Aviv area with a UAV.

Shortly after the Houthi missile attack, fourteen Israeli warplanes struck areas in Yemen in two waves of airstrikes. The first wave saw strikes on the Hudaydah Port, the Port of Salif, and the Ras Isa oil terminal, while the second wave hit fuel depots of two power stations located near Sanaa. The IDF stated that its strikes targeted sites used by the Houthis for military operations and put the three ports they struck out of use, while destroying eight tugboats. Al-Masirah stated that the attacks killed at least nine civilians and wounded three others, while damaging an oil facility and the Hudaydah Port.

The Houthis claimed to have carried out two successful UAV attacks on Israel in cooperation with the Islamic Resistance in Iraq on 20 December, including one against Israeli targets in southern Israel and another against a military site in central Israel.

On 21 December, a Houthi ballistic missile hit a playground in Jaffa after several failed interception attempts, lightly wounding 16 people, while another 14 were injured while fleeing to shelters and seven were treated for anxiety attacks. A man in Rishon LeZion died after suffering a cardiac arrest due to the missile sirens. The Houthis claimed to have targeted an Israeli military site in the Tel Aviv area with the Palestine 2 missile. Later that day, a UAV suspected to have been launched from Yemen was shot down by the IAF over southern Israel.

Also on 21 December, the US Central Command stated that the Us military carried out airstrikes on Sanaa, targeting a Houthi missile storage site and command facilities, in addition to shooting down multiple Houthi UAVs and an anti-ship cruise missile above the Red Sea. It later confirmed that USS Gettysburg accidentally shot down a F/A-18 Super Hornet fighter jet over the Red Sea in a friendly fire incident, with one of its pilots suffering minor injuries. The Houthis meanwhile claimed to have thwarted the attack and shoot down the American jet, adding that they fired eight cruise missiles and 17 UAVs at American destroyers.

On 23 December, the IDF intercepted a UAV outside the Israeli airspace, with the Houthis claiming to have launched two UAVs towards Ashkelon and the Tel Aviv area. A ballistic missile launched by the Houthis was intercepted on the following day by the Arrow defense system before entering Israeli airspace. A woman was seriously injured while running to shelter, while 25 others were treated for anxiety attacks or light injuries received while running to shelters. Israeli defense minister Israel Katz later threatened to target Houthi leaders in response.

On the morning of 25 December, a Houthi missile was intercepted outside Israeli airspace. Nine people were injured while rushing to bomb shelters and two were treated for anxiety attacks. Fragment from an interceptor missile caused minor damage in Be'er Ya'akov, while shrapnel was also reported to have landed in the Shephelah and Modi'in-Maccabim-Re'ut. Later that day, a UAV launched by the group from crashed into an open area near Ashkelon, causing no casualties. The Houthis claimed to have launched two UAVs, one at a site in the Tel Aviv area and the other at the industrial zone in Ashkelon. The Houthis also claimed that they had dismantled a spy ring working for the Central Intelligence Agency and Mossad, stating that its members were monitoring Houthi military installations and collecting information on senior political and military figures.

On 26 December, 25 IAF jets carried out airstrikes in Yemen against Houthi targets, hitting the Sanaa International Airport, where an air traffic control tower, the departure lounge and runway were damaged; the Hezyaz power station near Sanaa; as well as infrastructure in Al Hudaydah, As-Salif, and Ras Qantib ports, including a power plant. At least six people were killed and at least 40 others were wounded in the attacks according to the Houthis, with Director-General of the World Health Organization Tedros Adhanom Ghebreyesus, who was visiting Yemen to negotiate the release of UN staff members as well as employees of diplomatic missions and NGO workers arrested by the Houthis, narrowly escaping being killed, and an employee of the United Nations Humanitarian Air Service being seriously wounded.

The Houthis launched another ballistic missile overnight at Tel Aviv overnight on 26–27 December, claiming to have successfully targeted the Ben Gurion Airport, causing casualties and putting it out of operation. It was intercepted outside of Israeli airspace by the Terminal High Altitude Area Defense (THAAD) system of the US, marking its first use since its deployment to Israel in October. Eighteen people were lightly wounded while running to a bomb shelter, while two suffered anxiety attacks. The group also claimed to have carried out a UAV attack on the Tel Aviv area, but there were no reports confirming such an attack. Al-Masirah later reported that the US and UK-led coalition carried out an airstrike on the September 21 Park in the Ma'ain district of Sanaa.

A missile launched from Yemen was intercepted by the IDF outside Israeli airspace, with one person suffering from an anxiety attack. The Houthis later claimed to have successfully struck the Nevatim Airbase. Al-Masirah meanwhile reported that the US and UK-led coalition had carried out two airstrikes in the Bahis area of Midi district in the Hajjah Governorate. The Houthis also claimed that they had shot down a US MQ-9 Reaper UAV over the Al Bayda Governorate.

A ballistic missile launched by the Houthis was intercepted by the Arrow defense system before crossing into Israeli territory on 30 December, with fragments of the missile falling in Beit Shemesh. A girl was injured while running towards a shelter, while multiple were treated for anxiety attacks. The Houthis claimed to have launched two missiles targeting the Ben-Gurion Airport and a power station south of Jerusalem.

On 31 December, the United States Central Command stated that ships and aircraft of the US Navy struck Houthi targets from 30 to 31 December, in addition to shooting down several missiles and kamikaze UAVs over the Red Sea. Al-Masirah stated that the US forces targeted the al-Ardi Complex housing the headquarters of the Ministry of Defense and the 22nd May Complex housing the headquarters of the Ministry of Information.

== See also ==
- 2024 Israeli invasion of Lebanon — The war between Israel and Hezbollah, involving an Israeli ground invasion of Lebanon.
