= Israel–Yemen relations =

Bilateral relations

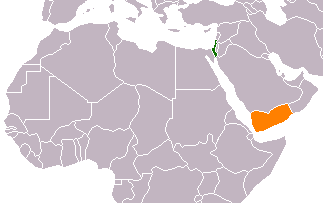
- Israel: Yemen

The State of Israel and the Republic of Yemen do not have diplomatic relations. Since Israel's formal establishment in 1948, Yemen and its predecessors (the Kingdom of Yemen and the Yemen Arab Republic in the North, and South Yemen in the South) have repeatedly denounced Israel in the context of regional conflicts with Palestine and the wider Arab world. Since the Houthi insurgency in Yemen, direct strikes between the Houthis and Israel have taken place.

Holders of an Israeli passport or any passport with an Israeli stamp are barred entry to Yemen and Yemen is classified as an "enemy state" under Israeli law.

== History ==
Yemen occupies a strategic position at the entrance to the Red Sea and controls the Bab-el-Mandeb, Israel's outlet to the Indian Ocean and the Far East. Yemenite Jews once formed a sizable Jewish minority in Yemen with a distinct culture but most of them immigrated (ethnically and religiously expelled) to Israel in the mid-20th century.

In February 1948, Imam Yahya was assassinated and Ahmad bin Yahya came to power. The new Imam called upon all Arabs to unite against the Zionist State. He promised to provide Egypt with assistance in the war against Israel, but his contributions were minor. After the Arab defeat and establishment of the State of Israel, he feared that Israel might demand reparations for Jewish property in Yemen. Thinking this, he swiftly set in motion a plan for Jewish emigration en masse; referred to as "Operation Magic Carpet", the effort would see nearly 50,000 Jews flying safely out of Yemen.

In 1964, an Egyptian pilot, Captain Abbas Hilmi defected to Israel and told his interrogators that the Egyptians were using poison gas against the Yemeni Royalists. In an effort to rid itself of the Egyptian military force, the Royalist government appealed to the UAR to send forces to fight against Israel.

In an attempt to explore the underlying reasons for the Six-Day War, observers concluded that both the U.S. and Great Britain sought the withdrawal of Egyptian forces from Yemen and that the war's objective was to restore the Royalist regime. Many Yemenis were convinced that Israel was behind this maneuver. Rumors spread in South Yemen that shortly before their withdrawal from there, the British collaborated with Israel in an attempt to crush the tribes of Southern Arabia in order to prolong their colonial rule.

Following the Six-Day War, Yemen severed its diplomatic relations with the US due to "Washington's blind support to Israel against the Arab cause in Palestine" and condemned Israel for its occupation of Palestinian land. The division of Yemen into two countries following Britain's withdrawal was a source of major concern for the Israelis. A Yemeni government official assured the Americans that "North Yemen would do nothing to undermine U.S. peace efforts in the current Egyptian–Israeli talks to implement the Camp David agreements." In the early fall of 1987, relatively little attention was paid to the Arab-Israeli conflict due to the fact that the threat from Iran became the Arab world's primary occupation, and the YAR was just as concerned about the Iranian threat as its neighbors in South Arabia.

=== South Yemen ===
On 22 June 1969, the Corrective Move led to the overthrow of Qahtan al-Shaabi and brought Salim Rubaya Ali to the Presidency.

The foreign policy resolutions of the Unification Congress of October 1975 called for support for the Palestinians. Reacting to Israel's raids in south Lebanon, Abd al-Fattah Ismail, a spokesman for South Yemen, attested to the close link with the Arab liberation movement in its entirety. In February 1977, Yasser Arafat was cordially received in Aden where he was referred to as "Brother Arafat the President of Palestine," and In March 1977, President Rubiyya Ali met the Somali, Sudanese and YAR chiefs of state in Taiz, in order to consider means of consolidating Arab solidarity "in order to confront Israel's aggressive policy and the Zionist forces supporting it". Responding to accusations made by Washington that South Yemen supported terrorism, Foreign Ministry officials in Aden claimed that supporting the just cause of national liberation movements, suppressed by Zionist imperialist and racist regimes did not constitute an act of terrorism.

Yet after the 1973 blockade, Yemen did not interrupt the free navigation of Israeli ships originating from Eilat, and when Soviet Premier Alexei Kosygin visited Aden in September 1979, South Yemen was prepared to accept the principle of freedom of navigation for all ships from "all adjoining states". At the same time, officials in Aden continued to express solidarity of their Arab neighbors. Therefore, in 1976 South Yemen sent troops as part of the Arab deterrent force in Lebanon, and when Ali Nasser Muhammad visited Moscow in February 1978, the joint communique issued by the two governments condemned the Israeli-Egyptian dialogue.

In 1982, South Yemen went along with the North Yemen's proposal to host PLO forces after their eviction from Lebanon by the Israelis. In 1983, it played a major diplomatic role in restoring unity within the Palestinian camp.

=== After reunification ===
Covert negotiations regarding the transfer of Jews to Israel were denied by San'a. In an interview to Radio Amman, Yemen's Deputy Information Minister Abd-al-Rahman al-Akwa denied reports from Israeli and American sources that attempts were being made to transfer Yemeni Jews to Israel. When the London Sunday Times reported that Israel was preparing to airlift Yemeni Jews to Israel, Yemeni sources denied that San'a decided to expel the Jews and added that "Yemeni citizens, including Jews have the right to travel to any country except Israel. Ariel Sharon, who later became Israel's Minister of Housing was reported to have said that 1,600 Yemeni Jews were about to emigrate to Israel, and Integration Minister Rabbi Yitzhak Perez stated that Israel was using "secret efforts to bring 1,500 Jews from Yemen." In May 1992, Radio Monte Carlo in Arabic announced that a "responsible" Yemeni source has denied the veracity of the report about the immigration of Jews. In the spring of 1993, Israeli sources said that some 100 Jews immigrated secretly to Israel. Attempting to cover up the immigration issue, Yemeni sources said that prominent Jews had asked for protection against Israeli attempts to coerce them to immigrate to Israel.

In the autumn of 1993, Saleh met Mousa Abu Marzook, head of the Hamas Political Bureau. The President of Yemen expressed full support for the Palestinian struggle, and they discussed ways to bring all Palestinian factions to agree on a common strategy. In an interview with an Egyptian weekly, Saleh said that his country would be willing to host a meeting of all Palestinian factions, in order to discuss their differences and bring unity to their ranks. In another interview with a London-based Arabic newspaper, Basindwah said that Yemen would exert every effort in order to reconcile all factions within the Palestinian camp and called on the Palestinians to prevent Israel from benefiting from the dissension in their ranks. When interviewed by the Egyptian press, Basindwah said that his government would support any decision made by the Palestinians. And when asked about the future of the Palestinian forces stationed in Yemen, he said that: "The Palestinian forces stationed in Yemen are actually in their homeland. But whether they decide to stay or leave is a matter for the PLO to decide."

Despite its willingness to moderate its attitude towards Israel, San'a was not ready to take any step which might trigger Arab criticism against it. Even reports regarding the relaxation of the Arab Boycott against Israel by Oman and other Gulf countries did not inspire the Yemeni government to follow suit. In a statement to Al Ahram, Basindwah said that his country was not ready to end the boycott of Israel before a just and comprehensive peace in the Middle East became reality.

The Yemeni government seemed determined to maintain friendly relations with Egypt, even though the latter concluded a peace agreement with Israel. During his visit to Cairo in August 1993, Basindwah said: "The relations between Yemen and Egypt are deep rooted. These relations were baptized by blood when the Egyptian people and Army helped Yemen during our revolution against the defunct imams' rule and British colonialism". In an interview with an Egyptian newspaper, Saleh expressed his country's unqualified support for Egypt.

In March 1994, Sheikh Abd-al-Majid al-Zindani, member of the Yemeni Presidential Council warned against what he regarded as a foreign and Zionist scheme to partition Yemen into several stateless in order to make it easier to control its oil wealth and strategic location, especially in the strait of Bab el Mandab. In 1995, Yemen and Eritrea had a conflict over the strategic Hanish islands in the Red Sea. The Yemenis were convinced that Israel was involved in the conflict. Yemen's Deputy Prime Minister and Foreign Minister Abd-al-Karim al-Iryani said in a news conference:

In fact, it has been proved beyond any doubt that there was a direct Israeli involvement, we would have been very happy to announce this, for several reasons which I do not care to discuss here. But we know in advance, and we were told by the Eritreans before we had a dispute with them that they received a grant from Israel, in the form of four or six boats. This fact was known to us, and we mentioned it in the media. What we know are the statements by the Israeli health minister ... It is normal for Israel to sympathize with Eritrea. Eritrea has official diplomatic relations with Israel. Do you expect it to support Yemen, which has not yet announced an end to the state of war with Israel?

— Abd-al-Karim al-Iryani, Yemeni Foreign Minister, news conference

While waging a verbal campaign against Israel, Yemen continued to collaborate closely with Iran and Iraq. It denounced U.S. policy toward Iraq and assisted Saddam Hussein on every occasion. According to the London-based newspaper Asharq Al-Awsat, 19 Iraqi pilots were being trained in Yemen in the fall of 1993. According to Iran's Minister of the Interior, Ali Mohammad Besharati, the promotion of his country's relations with Yemen was a pivotal feature of Iranian diplomacy.

In February 1996, Abd-al-Wahhab Darawsha and Talab al-Sani, both leaders of the Democratic Party and Knesset members arrived in San'a at the invitation of the Yemeni parliament, the House of Representatives. The Yemeni government did not give publicity to their visit.

In the spring of 1996, Yemeni Deputy Prime Minister and Foreign Minister, Abd al-Karim al-Iryani said that his government was deeply suspicious of what he called "the Zionist entity's intentions and seriousness in the search for peace". Yemen's Prime Minister, Faraj Said Bin Ghanem discussed issues of national security with his Egyptian counterpart, Kamal Ganzouri and Assistant Yemeni Foreign Minister, Eid Ali Abdel Rahman told news reporters that San'a would not take any steps towards establishing diplomatic relations with Israel until the latter agreed to the establishment of a Palestinian state with East Jerusalem as its capital.

In October 2008, security forces arrested six alleged Islamist militants linked to Israeli intelligence. In March 2009, a state security court sentenced 27-year-old Abdullah al-Haidari to death after convicting him of establishing contacts with the office of former Israeli Prime Minister Ehud Olmert. A three-year prison term for another convict in the case, Emad Ali al-Raimi, 24, was also confirmed by the appeals court. The court also lowered the sentence for a third convict Ali Abdullah al-Mahfal, 25, from five to three years. The three remaining suspects were released before trial, due to lack of evidence.

=== Yemeni responses to Israeli military action (2006–2014) ===
In the midst of the 2006 Lebanon War, The ruling party, the General People's Congress, strongly condemned the actions of what it considered to be aggressions against the Palestinians and the Lebanese and called for the international community to intervene. Other political parties have also condemned the Israelis, and announced their support for the Palestinian and Lebanese people "in their fight for their right of survival and defeating occupier." They also called for the closing of Israeli embassies in Arab countries. Thousands came together in the capital city, Sana'a, on 19 July to protest the Israeli attacks against the Palestinians and Lebanese. The demonstration was organized by the ruling and opposition political parties.

Israeli action during the Gaza War (2008–2009) prompted Yemeni President Ali Abdullah Saleh condemned the Israeli raids as a "barbaric aggression". Tens of thousands of people marched, many carrying banners condemning Israel and what they called "Arab silence" over the "extermination of the Palestinian people by the Zionist enemy". Following the war Yemen has prepared 42 tons of aid for the people of Gaza. Yemen has also declared its readiness to receive 500 injured Palestinians from the Gaza Strip and treat them in Yemeni hospitals.

In response to the 2010 Gaza flotilla raid, the Yemeni Parliament strongly condemned the Israeli attack and demanded for "an Islamic army to encounter the Israeli arrogance."

During the 2012 Gaza War, according to a statement released to the Saba News Agency from a government source, "Yemen has announced its strong condemnation and denunciation of the "brutal Zionist aggression on the Gaza Strip, and standing of the Yemeni people with their brothers in Palestine at all times". The unnamed spoken also said that "The Yemeni government calls for the international community to bare their responsibilities towards the Zionist offensive and take swift action to stop this brutal aggression". The Yemeni parliament has denounced the Israeli operation, considering it an "aggression against all Arab and Muslim countries" and calling for using oil as a weapon to end the Israeli operation. It called on the Arab parliaments and shoura councils to hold an urgent meeting to discuss the "Israeli aggression against Gaza", calling for visiting Gaza in sympathy with its people. On 17 November, Permanent Representative of Yemen to the Arab League, Mohammed al-Haisami called "all Arab states to put an end to the cruel Zionist aggression on the Gaza Strip and to stop the crimes committed by Israel on the Palestinian people".On 19 November, hundreds marched in Sanaa to "affirm their solidarity with those under siege in the Gaza strip". The demonstrators, which began at Change Square, marched to the local Hamas office in Haseba district.

The Yemeni government denounced Israel during the 2014 Gaza War.

=== Yemini civil war and Houthi relations ===
Since the beginning of the Yemeni civil war in 2014, both the Presidential Leadership Council and Houthis have refused normalization with Israel. The general public in Israel are increasingly growing concerned in regards to Houthi capability to potentially attack Israel. During a 2019 conference on fighting Iranian terrorism, a tense situation arose when the President of Yemen Abdrabbuh Mansur Hadi had to sit next to the Prime Minister of Israel Benjamin Netanyahu even though the two are enemies. With backing from the UAE, groups in the south of Yemen are warming up to the idea of normalized relations.

Following the Houthi insurgency in Yemen, tensions grew with Israel. Analyst Salem Al Ketbi argued that a Houthi attack on Israel, albeit unlikely, is still a possibility, but could take the form of an intelligence or cyberspace attack rather than a military one.

==== Middle Eastern and Red Sea crises (2023–present) ====
Shortly after the Gaza war began in October 2023, Houthi militants based in Yemen began targeting civilian merchant and naval vessels passing through the Red Sea. The Houthis said that their attacks would continue until Israel ended its "crimes in Gaza." The group said it would target vessels linked to Israel, but has primarily indiscriminately attacked many vessels with no relation to the country. By May 2024, Houthis had conducted over 50 attacks; Houthi leader Abdul-Malik al-Houthi said his forces had launched 606 ballistic missiles and drones against 107 ships affiliated with Israel and its allies across the Red Sea, Bab-el-Mandeb strait, Gulf of Aden, and Indian Ocean.

In addition to attacking ships in the Red Sea, Houthis targeted Israel itself with countless airstrikes and drone attacks since the war began, prompting retaliatory strikes by Israel. The first was on 19 October 2023, when United States officials said the USS Carney shot down three land-attack cruise missiles and several drones heading toward Israel launched by the Houthis in Yemen. After a Houthi drone attack in July 2024 killed one person and injured 10 others near the U.S. embassy office in Tel Aviv, Israel responded by attacking military facilities and oil depots in al-Hudaydah, Yemen, killing at least six and wounding at least 83. Israel attacked Yemen again in September, killing six and injuring 57 others. After Houthi attacks in December 2024, Israel launched two waves of strikes against Houthi territory in al-Hudaydah and Sanaa, killing a total of 13 people. The most deadly of these strikes targeted the Sanaa International Airport.

During much of the January 2025 Gaza war ceasefire, which was agreed to on 15 January, Houthi attacks against ships in the Red Sea and against Israeli territory largely subsided. The Houthis announced a resumption in attacks on 11 March, citing insufficient humanitarian aid entering Gaza. Effective 11 March, Yemeni forces declared the Bab-el-Mandeb strait closed to all Israeli-owned and Israeli-flagged shipping until all crossings into the Gaza Strip were reopened and the entry of humanitarian supplies was authorized. After the March 2025 Israeli strikes on Gaza, the Houthis pledged escalation on 18 March. On 4 May, a Houthi attack hit the Ben Gurion Airport in Israel; in response, Israel carried out retaliatory attacks on Yemen, including an attack on Sanaa International Airport.

== Cultural ties ==
When the Israeli singer, Ofra Haza planned to visit Yemen, where her parents emigrated from, the Yemeni government gave its approval. The organ of the Nasserist Unionist People's Organisation, Al-Warawi, was critical of this decision: "The visit proves that the ruling coalition began to march toward normalization of cultural and economic relations with Israel." It added that the approval given to the singer's visit was "a flying balloon whose purpose is to gauge the response of the nation and the parties before additional steps to normalize relations can be taken." The organ of the Arab Socialist Ba'ath Party, Al-Thawri, claimed that the attempt to improve relations with Israel was part of a Yemeni grand design to become friendly with the United States.

In 2010, Yemen sacked the country's chess team and members of the governing body after its players competed against Israel at a tournament in Belarus. The Yemeni Sports minister, Hamud Mohammed Ubad, ordered the dismissal after players ignored instructions to pull out if drawn against Israel. Ubad said that "this was an individual action contrary to the policy of Yemen, which refuses any normalisation with Israel".

== See also ==
- Foreign relations of Israel
- Foreign relations of Yemen
- International recognition of Israel
