= Timeline of the Red Sea crisis =

These are monthly timelines of the Red Sea crisis, which began on 19 October 2023.

The Houthis have also mounted a campaign targeting international commercial vessels passing through the Red Sea demanding an end to the Gaza war.

== 2023 ==
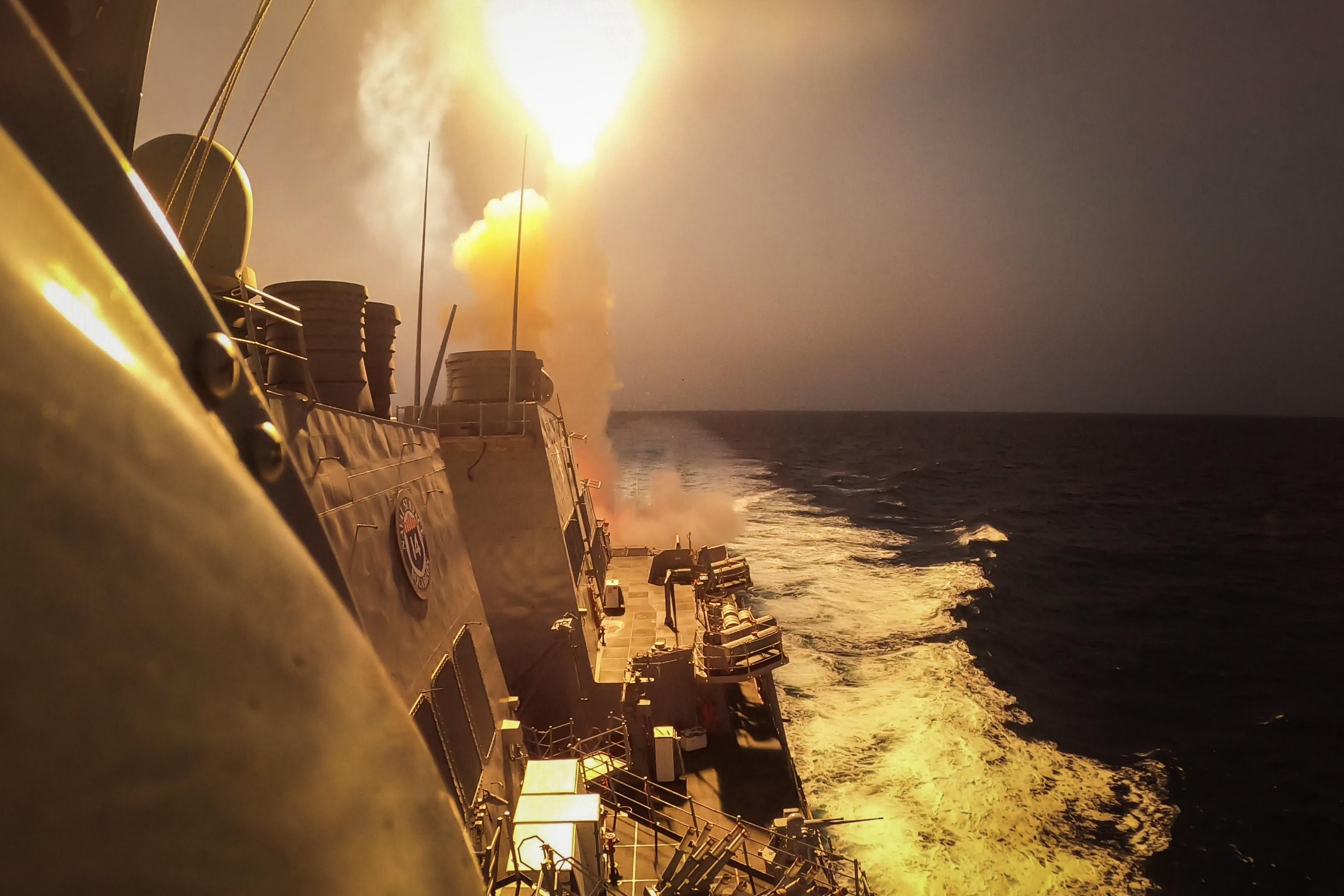
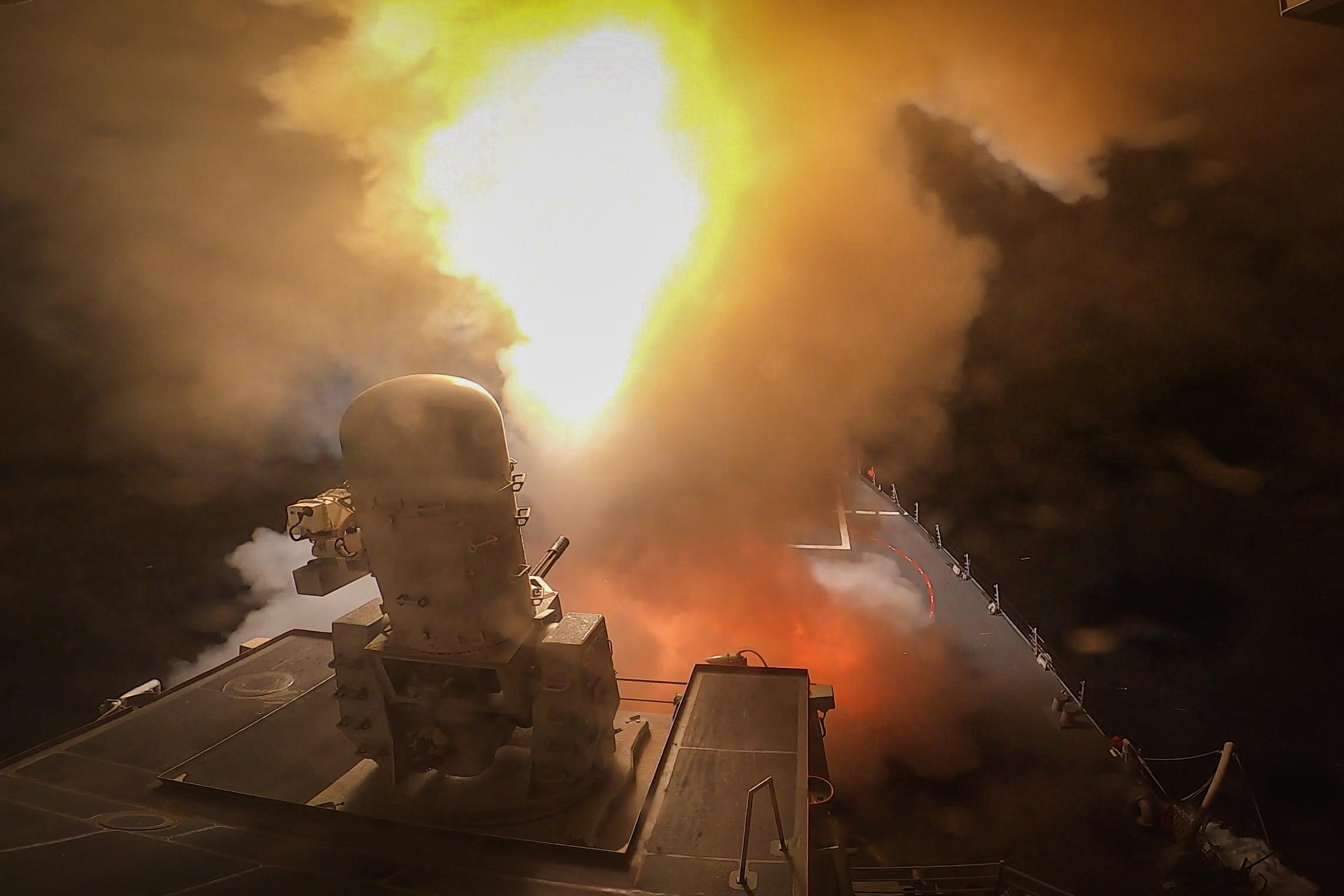
USS Carney engages with Houthi missiles, 19 October 2023.

On 8 October 2023, the day after the October 7 attacks, U.S. Secretary of Defense Lloyd Austin directed the Gerald R. Ford carrier strike group to the Eastern Mediterranean in response. Along with the aircraft carrier USS Gerald R. Ford, the group includes the cruiser Normandy, and the destroyers Carney, Ramage, Roosevelt and Thomas Hudner.

On 19 October 2023, US officials said the United States Navy destroyer USS Carney shot down three land-attack cruise missiles and several drones heading toward Israel launched by the Houthis in Yemen. This was the first action by the US military to defend Israel since the outbreak of the war. It was later reported that the ship shot down four cruise missiles and 15 drones. Another missile was reportedly intercepted by Saudi Arabia. More were intercepted by Israel's Arrow anti-ballistic missiles; others fell short of their targets or were intercepted by the Israeli Air Force and the French Navy.

The Houthis continued attacking Israel with UAVs and missiles over the following months. A US MQ-9 Reaper drone was shot down off the coast of Yemen by Houthi air defences on 8 November; the Pentagon previously said that MQ-9 drones were flying over Gaza in an intelligence gathering role to aid in the hostage recovery efforts. On 9 November, the Houthis fired a missile toward the city of Eilat. The missile was intercepted by an Arrow 3 missile, marking the first time it was used in an interception.

On 30 November, Saudi media reported that an Israeli airstrike caused an explosion at a Houthi arms depot in Sana'a, the capital of Yemen. Houthi officials denied the report, stating that a gas station was hit instead. A member of the Houthis' political bureau, Hezam al-Asad, said that the explosion was caused by the remnants of a bomb left over from the Yemeni civil war.

On 14 December, India initiated Operation Sankalp to ensure the security of the regional maritime domain. The destroyer INS Kolkata was stationed in the Gulf of Aden for maritime security on 18 December. The destroyer INS Kochi was already deployed in the region to counter Somali pirates, although the Government of India remained silent about its involvement in Operation Prosperity Guardian. By 21 December, the port of Eilat, which gives Israel via the Red Sea its only easy shipping access to Asia without the need to transit the Suez Canal, had seen an 85% drop in activity due to the Houthi action. On 26 December, India deployed the destroyers INS Mormugao and Visakhapatnam in the Arabian Sea after an Israel-affiliated merchant vessel was struck off the Indian coast. The navy was investigating the nature of the attack on the vessel, MV Chem Pluto, which docked in Mumbai on Monday, and initial reports pointed to a drone attack, a navy statement said. The Pentagon said on Saturday that a drone launched from Iran struck the Chem Pluto in the Indian Ocean. The Foreign Ministry of Iran denied the US accusations and called them "baseless". The vessel's crew included 21 Indians and 1 Vietnamese citizen.

== 2024 ==
On 4 January, just hours after warning, Houthis launched an unmanned surface vessel (USV) towards US Navy and commercial vessels, but it detonated well over 1 nautical mile (1.9 km; 1.2 mi) from the ships. On 7 January, the Houthi movement stated that retaliatory attacks against the US Navy would continue unless the US handed over the Navy service members who killed the 10 Houthi attack boat personnel for them to stand trial in Yemen. Meanwhile, the Pakistan Navy deployed two Tughril-class frigates, PNS Tughril and Taimur in the Arabian Sea following "recent incidents of maritime security."

On 10 January, a large-scale attack was initiated by the Houthis against USS Dwight D. Eisenhower, USS Gravely, USS Laboon, USS Mason and HMS Diamond, in which at least 21 UAVs and missiles were launched. On 11 January, US Navy SEALs raided a ship off the coast of Somalia which was bound for the Houthi militants. Iranian-made missile components and other weapons, including air defense parts, were seized from the ship. The ship was then sunk and its crew of 14 people detained. Two SEALs were killed in the mission.

On 12 January, the US and UK conducted airstrikes against over a dozen Houthi targets in Yemen with the support of multiple other countries, just hours after the group's leader vowed that any American attack on its forces would "not go without a response". The strikes were the first time Houthi targets in Yemen were targeted since the beginning of the Red Sea crisis.The Houthis said five of their fighters were killed and six others were injured.

US Forces and allies conduct joint strikes in Yemen, 22 January 2024

On 21 January, the French frigate Alsace joined defence operations in the Red Sea after transiting through the Suez Canal, reinforcing French assets deployed in the area in the face of Houthi attacks against international shipping. On 24 January, Houthis claimed to have attacked US destroyers and other warships in the Red Sea. This attack supposed to be in response to Operation Poseidon Archer. Houthi claimed to have directly hit a US destroyer with a missile during the attack. This attack was denied by the United States government. On the night of 26 to 27 January, the French frigate Alsace came to the aid of an oil tanker on fire in the Gulf of Aden, alongside Indian and American destroyers INS Visakhapatnam and USS Carney. The fire suffered by the Marlin Luanda tanker was caused by a missile fired from Yemen. It was brought under control after 20 hours, with no casualties sustained.

On 29 January, Danish frigate HDMS Iver Huitfeldt departed from the Korsør naval base for the Red Sea to assist the US-led coalition in safeguarding commercial traffic against Houthi attacks. On 31 January, top European Union diplomat Josep Borrell announced that the bloc plans to start a naval mission to protect merchant shipping in the Red Sea within the following three weeks, and officials stated that seven EU member states were prepared to provide military equipment. An adviser to Borrell stated that the mission's launch date should be 19 February. Borrell added that the mission would be called 'Aspides', which translates to 'protector'.

On 3 February, a day after conducting airstrikes in Iraq and Syria, the US and UK conducted strikes against 36 Houthi sites, which included underground facilities, UAV storage and operation sites, missile systems, radars, and helicopters in 13 different locations across Houthi-controlled parts of Yemen in an attempt to degrade their capabilities. Houthi official Mohammed Al-Bukhaiti stated that they would "meet escalation with escalation" in response to the bombings. Houthi official media stated that 17 fighters were killed during the airstrikes. On 8 February, the German frigate Hessen departed from Wilhelmshaven for the Red Sea with about 240 people on board in order to assist the upcoming Operation Aspides.

On 15 February, the US Army announced that the Coast Guard seized a vessel originating from Iran and was bound for Houthi-controlled Yemen on 28 January. The US Army said the vessel was carrying advanced weapons and other "lethal aid". It had more than 200 packages containing ballistic missile and naval drone components, explosives, communications gear, and anti-tank missile launcher parts. On 19 February, the European Union announced the start of the naval mission Operation Aspides, planning to send warships and provide early airborne warning systems to the Red Sea and surrounding waters. The launch was confirmed by Italian Foreign Affairs Minister Antonio Tajani. France, Germany, Italy and Belgium all announced their intention to contribute to the operation. Operation Aspides is headquartered in Larissa, Greece. The operation is not allowed to attack pre-emptively, and will only fire on Houthis if they attack first. The operation only operates at sea, and does not conduct or participate in military strikes.

On 22 February, the Houthis' Humanitarian Operations Coordination Center sent statements to shipping insurers and firms announcing a formal ban on vessels owned or partially owned by Israeli, British, or American entities or individuals in the Red Sea, Gulf of Aden, and Arabian Sea. The ban also included vessels sailing under the flags of the mentioned nations. Houthi leader Abdul-Malik al-Houthi also said in a statement that operations in the Red Sea and surrounding waters were continuing, escalating and effective, and announced the introduction of "submarine weapons" without giving further details.

On 26 February, damages were reported to Red Sea undersea communications cables. Initial reports by industry sources, African press, and Israeli press, tied this to Houthi attacks that was predicted by international press, while Seacom was unable to confirm the cause, they later confirmed the location of the damage to be in Yemeni maritime jurisdictions. Press releases by Seacom and Flag Telecom were describing the difficulty of repair due to the crisis in shipping. Houthi leaders denied involvement. The same day, Greece approved a decision to send the Greek frigate Hydra to the Red Sea to assist Operation Aspides. Also on 26 February, the German frigate Hessen launched two SM-2 missiles at an American Reaper drone in a friendly fire incident. The missiles missed their target, falling into the sea.

On 4 March, Houthi Telecommunications Minister Misfer Al-Numair said that vessels entering Yemeni waters would need a permit from the Houthi-controlled Maritime Affairs Authority. Meanwhile, INS Kolkata, deployed to the Gulf of Aden, responded to a request from MSC Sky II, a Liberian flagged container vessel, that had reportedly been attacked. On 8 March, Finland announced they will send up to five officers to the Operation Aspides mission and up to two soldiers to take part in the US-led Operation Prosperity Guardian. The Royal Netherlands Navy also confirmed the same day that it would be sending the De Zeven Provinciën-class frigate HNLMS Tromp to the Red Sea. The frigate would be a part of Operation Prosperity Guardian but also support Operation Aspides.

On 14 March, the Russian state news agency RIA Novosti reported that the Houthis claimed to have a hypersonic missile. On 21 March, Bloomberg reported that the Houthis reached a deal with Russia and China, agreeing to provide safe passage for vessels under their jurisdiction in exchange for political support. The IDF also announced on the same day that it intercepted a "suspicious aerial target" approaching Israeli territory over the Red Sea.

On 28 March, several Russian Pacific Fleet warships navigated into the Red Sea via the Bab al-Mandeb Strait, including the Russian cruiser Varyag and the Russian frigate Marshal Shaposhnikov according to Zvezda. This was reportedly after the Houthis made a political deal with Russia and China, allowing them safe passage possibly in exchange for blocking resolutions at the UN Security Council.

On 3 April, Danish chief of defense Flemming Lentfer was fired after failing to report flaws regarding air defenses and weapons systems aboard the Ivar Huitfeldt frigate which emerged after a Houthi attack in March, when the frigate's air defenses failed while engaging with Houthis. A problem also occurred with the frigate's ammunition system, which caused half of the rounds it fired to detonate before hitting their target. Tim Lenderking, the United States special envoy for Yemen, meanwhile stated that he hoped to achieve a diplomatic solution with the Yemeni Houthis in regard to their attacks, and that the US would consider removing the Houthis from its designated terrorist list if they ceased their attacks.

On 13 April, the Houthis in coordination with Iran launched several drones at Israel amidst the Iranian strikes against Israel, according to the maritime security agency Ambrey. The organization said that the target of the drones were potentially Israeli ports, and that collateral damage to shipping was likely. The following day, the IDF's C-Dome system intercepted an aerial target in the Eilat area, which came from the direction of the Red Sea.

In early May, Houthi-run Saba News Agency reported that at least 18 people were arrested on accusations of spying for the US and Israel. On 3 May, the Houthi-aligned Yemeni Armed Forces SPC military spokesperson Yahya Saree announced the expansion of their campaign to the targeting of ships in the eastern Mediterranean bound for Israel.

On 30 May, the US and UK conducted strikes against 13 Houthi targets across Yemen, killing 16 people and injuring 42 others. The Houthis on the next day threatened to escalate their attacks in response and claimed to have targeted the USS Dwight D. Eisenhower with drones and ballistic missiles.. The Houthis targeted the USS Dwight D. Eisenhower, USS Gravely, and three commercial vessels on 1 June.

On 6 June, the Houthis and the Islamic Resistance in Iraq claimed to have launched two coordinated attacks on Haifa. Israel however denied these claims. The Houthis later stated that they would intensify their joint operations with the Islamic Resistance in Iraq. Meanwhile, at least eleven Yemeni UN workers were arrested by the Houthis. Four days later, the group claimed that they had arrested an undisclosed number of members of an "American-Israeli spy network" that disguised itself as international and UN organizations, and aired purported confessions from ten Yemenis, claiming that several of them were recruited by the U.S. Embassy in Yemen. None of the people in the taped confessions however were among the UN workers arrested four days earlier.

CNN on 11 June published a report citing three American officials stating that American intelligence agencies believed the Houthis were discussing amongst themselves about arming the Somali militant group Al-Shabaab, and officials were investigating whether any weapon deliveries had been made or if Iran was involved.

On 7 July, the Port of Eilat's CEO said there had been no activity at the port in the past eight months, and he was requesting financial assistance from the Israeli government. A few days later the CEO said the port was in a state of bankruptcy. On 15 July, the UAE-based news network Al-Ain reported that the Houthis had lost contact with a large vessel smuggling foreign personnel and missile equipment to Al Hudaydah.

On 19 July, an explosion caused by a Yemeni UAV in Tel Aviv killed one person and wounded at least ten others near the U.S. consulate. The Houthis later claimed responsibility for the attack, stating that they used a drone called "Jaffa" which was capable of evading radar and interception systems, and added that they would continue to target Tel Aviv as a primary target within their operational range. On 20 July, Israel carried out several airstrikes on infrastructure in Al Hudaydah.. More than 220 projectiles had been launched by the Houthis on Israel by 20 July according to the IDF. Abdul-Malik al-Houthi on 21 July stated that the Israeli airstrikes would lead to an escalation of Houthi attacks on Israel, adding that they would continue supporting Palestinians and would move to a new level of attacks in future. The group described the attack on Tel Aviv as the beginning of the fifth phase of their attacks.

CNN reported in August 2024 that Russia was planning to ship weapons to Houthis in late-July 2024, in retaliation for the US supporting Ukraine during Russia's invasion of the country, but refrained from doing after being warned by Saudi Arabia, who was also requested by the US to pressure Russia.

On 15 September, the Houthis launched a ballistic missile that was partially intercepted by the Arrow defense system according to the IDF, with its fragments falling in open fields, causing a fire in an open area near Lod, and on a train station in Modi'in-Maccabim-Re'ut. Nine people suffered minor injuries while running to bomb shelters. More than 2,365,000 Israelis sought shelter with alerts that lasted 90 seconds in the greater Tel Aviv area. The Houthis claimed that they had targeted an Israeli military position in the Tel Aviv district with a new hypersonic ballistic missile which the IDF failed to intercept. On 29 September, the Israeli Air Force struck Houthi targets in Al Hudaydah and Ras Issa, including power plants and port facilities, killing at least six people and injuring 57 others according to the Houthi-controlled Health Ministry.

Vice-chair of the UN-recognized Yemeni government and leader of the Southern Transitional Council Aidarus al-Zoubaidi on 24 September said that the airstrikes by the coalition on the Houthis had not seriously affected their capabilities during an interview with The Guardian. He also accused Iran and Russia of supplying the group with weapons. The United States Secretary of Defense Lloyd Austin on 16 October stated that Northrop B-2 Spirit bombers targeted five underground weapon storage facilities where Houthis stored weapons used in targeting commercial and military vessels. The US Central Command stated that there was no indication of civilians being harmed due to the attack. Al-Masirah meanwhile stated that airstrikes were carried out around Sana'a and Saada.

Overnight on 18 December, the Arrow defense system partially intercepted a Houthi ballistic missile before it entered Israeli airspace, the warhead however was undamaged and the shrapnel fell in Ramat Gan, with cars being damaged and a school collapsing. Shortly after the Houthi missile attack, fourteen Israeli warplanes struck areas in Yemen in two waves of airstrikes. The first wave saw strikes on the Hudaydah Port, the Port of Salif, and the Ras Isa oil terminal, while the second wave hit fuel depots of two power stations located near Sanaa. The IDF stated that its strikes targeted sites used by the Houthis for military operations and put the three ports they struck out of use, while destroying eight tugboats.

On 21 December, a Houthi ballistic missile hit a playground in Jaffa after several failed interception attempts, lightly wounding 16 people, while another 14 were injured while fleeing to shelters and seven were treated for anxiety attacks. A man in Rishon LeZion died after suffering a cardiac arrest due to the missile sirens. On 26 December, 25 IAF jets carried out airstrikes in Yemen against Houthi targets, hitting the Sanaa International Airport, the Hezyaz power station near Sanaa, as well as infrastructure in Al Hudaydah, As-Salif, and Ras Qantib ports, including a power plant. At least six people were killed and at least 40 others were wounded in the attacks according to the Houthis, with Director-General of the World Health Organization Tedros Adhanom Ghebreyesus, who was visiting Yemen to negotiate the release of UN staff members as well as employees of diplomatic missions and NGO workers arrested by the Houthis, narrowly escaping being killed, and an employee of the United Nations Humanitarian Air Service being seriously wounded.

== 2025 ==
On 14 January, a ballistic missile launched from Yemen was intercepted by Israeli air defenses during the early morning. A fragment of the missile crashed into a home in Mevo Beitar, causing damage, with eleven people being wounded while running to shelters and four being treated for acute anxiety. On 16 January, Houthi leader Abdul-Malik al-Houthi stated that January 2025 Gaza war ceasefire marked Israel's failure in the Gaza Strip. al-Houthi also warned that the group would attack again in case of any breach by Israel.

On 22 January, the Houthis stated that they had released all 25 crewmembers of the cargo vessel Galaxy Leader, which they had seized in November 2023, after mediation by Oman and a request by Hamas. The newly sworn in US president, Donald Trump, reimposed sanctions on the Houthis under the United States Department of State list of Foreign Terrorist Organizations in response to their attacks. The United Nations stated on 24 January that the Houthis had detained seven more UN personnel and that the organization would suspend movement of UN personnel in Houthi-controlled areas.

On 10 February, the United Nations suspended its operations in the Saada Governorate after the Houthis detained eight more of its staff members. The following day, WFP announced the death of one of its staff members detained by Houthis since January. Abdul-Malik al-Houthi meanwhile warned that the group would resume its attacks if the Gaza war ceasefire collapsed. On 13 February, Abdul Malik al-Houthi stated that his group would resume attacks if Israel and the US carried out Trump's plan to move Palestinians from the Gaza Strip.

On 5 March, the US imposed sanctions on seven senior members of the Houthi group who smuggled arms and military equipment and negotiated purchases of weapons with Russia. It also sanctioned Abdulwali Abdoh Hasan Al-Jabri, along with his company Al-Jabri General Trading and Investment Co., for raising funds for the Houthis and recruiting Yemenis as mercenaries to fight in Ukraine for Russia. On 7 March, amid the standoff over the ceasefire in the Gaza Strip, Abdul-Malik al-Houthi warned Israel to resume the entry of humanitarian aid into the Strip within four days or the group would resume its naval attacks against Israel. On 11 March, Houthi spokesman Yahya Saree announced that the group would resume its attacks on Israeli vessels unless the border crossings to the Gaza Strip were reopened and humanitarian aid resumed.

A report released by Conflict Armament Research on 13 March stated that the Houthis were importing components of hydrogen fuel cells from Chinese companies, enabling their UAVs to fly farther and better evade detection.

On 15 March, the US carried out aerial and naval strikes on dozens of Houthi military targets in Yemen after President Trump ordered an escalated military campaign against the Houthis, targeting radars, air defenses, missile and drone systems, and at least one senior Houthi commander. Trump later warned the Houthis to cease their attacks and also warned Iran against assisting them. On the night of 15–16 March, a Houthi missile landed in Egypt, leading the IDF to investigate whether the missile had been aimed at Israel. On 16 March, the Houthis stated that they had attacked USS Harry S. Truman and its strike group with 18 ballistic and cruise missiles and one UAV. A US official stated that US warplanes shot down 11 UAVs, with none coming close to the warship, while a missile fired by the group fell far from it in the water. The Houthis also announced a "ban" on US vessels entering the Red Sea, the Arabian Sea, and the Gulf of Aden, and said they would target US warships in response to the previous day's American airstrikes.

On 17 March, US Secretary of Defense Pete Hegseth warned the Houthis that the US would continue targeting them unless they stopped attacking international shipping. On 22 March, US National Security Advisor Michael Waltz stated during the day that the US had so far taken out main leaders of the Houthis, including the commander of their missile crew.

On 24 March, the White House stated that US government officials had mistakenly disclosed plans about striking the Houthis to Jeffrey Goldberg, editor-in-chief of The Atlantic, hours before the US carried out airstrikes on 15 March against the group. On 3 April, The Daily Telegraph cited a senior Iranian official who stated that Iran was ending its support for the Houthis, and added that a Russian military expert was advising the Houthis from Sanaa.

On 5 April, President Trump published a video during the day showing a purported bombing of Houthis in an earlier airstrike, however pro-Houthi media reported that it was an Eid gathering in Al Hudaydah Governorate of people not connected to the group. Moammar al-Eryani, the Minister of Information of the internationally recognised Yemeni government, stated that around 70 Houthi members were killed in the airstrike, in addition to members of the Islamic Revolutionary Guard Corps.

On 17 April, US airstrikes hit the Ras Isa oil port, killing 80 people and wounding 150 others according to the Houthis. The US State Department also accused Chang Guang Satellite Technology Co. Ltd., a Chinese commercial satellite image provider, of providing information to the Houthis, in addition to sanctioning International Bank of Yemen and three of its top officials for helping the Houthis evade sanctions. Meanwhile, pro-Hoithi media reported that the US also carried out airstrikes on a government complex in the Mukayras district of Al Bayda Governorate.

On 20 April, pro-Houthi media reported that US airstrikes hit Ma'ain and Shu'aub districts of Saana, with twelve being killed and 30 being wounded due to airstrikes on the Farwa neighborhood market in Shu'aub district. The US however later stated that the casualties were caused by an air defense missile of the Houthis. On 27 April, pro-Houthi media later reported that the US carried out airstrikes on the city of Sanaa as well as Saada and 'Amran governorates, killing eight people in the Bani Al Harith district of Sanaa and wounding several others. US Central Command meanwhile stated that the US military had carried out airstrikes on over 800 targets since 15 March, resulting in more than 650 Houthi casualties.

The Houthis stated on 28 April that they carried out an attack on USS Harry S. Truman and its accompanying warships in the Red Sea with cruise missiles, ballistic missiles and UAVs. An F/A-18 Super Hornet and its tow fell into the sea whilst being towed, with one sailor sustaining a minor injury.

On 4 May, a ballistic missile launched from Yemen hit a grove of trees near an access road of the main Terminal 3 of the Ben Gurion Airport, after the Arrow and the US THAAD systems failed to intercept it. Six people were wounded in the attack, while two others suffered acute anxiety. The Houthis stated that they had targeted the airport with a hypersonic ballistic missile, while also claiming to have struck a vital target in Ashkelon. Netanyahu later vowed to retaliate against Houthis and Iran through multiple strikes. On 5 May, around 20 IAF fighter jets carried out airstrikes on the Hudaydah Port, Al Salakhanah and Al Hawak neighborhoods of the city of Hodeidah, as well as a cement factory near the city of Bajil, in retaliation for the Houthi missile attack on Israel the previous day. At least four people were killed and 39 others were injured in the attacks according to the Houthi-run Health Ministry.

Trump separately announced on 6 May that the US would cease its attacks on the Houthis after the group agreed to stop its attacks on commercial shipping, with a deal being negotiated between the two by Oman. The group however warned that it would continue its attacks on Israel. While Oman stated that the group would halt its attacks on international shipping, the Houthis only stated that they would halt their attacks on military and commercial ships linked to the US. A F/A-18F Super Hornet meanwhile fell into the sea due to a failed landing on the runway of USS Harry S. Truman. The Houthis later claimed to have attacked the carrier and its accompanying warships with a ballistic missile and a number of UAVs before the ceasefire took effect, causing the crash of the fighter jet and the carrier retreating to the north of the Red Sea.

On 16 May, fifteen Israeli fighter jets carried out airstrikes on the ports of Hudaydah and Salif, dropping around 35 munitions per the IDF. The IDF estimated that it would take the Houthis a month to repair the two ports. Katz meanwhile threatened that Abdul-Malik al-Houthi would be assassinated if his group did not stop attacking Israel. The Houthi-controlled Health Ministry stated that one person was killed and nine others were wounded in the airstrikes.

On 19 May, the Houthis announced that they would implement a "maritime blockade" on the Port of Haifa. The USS Harry S. Truman meanwhile had left for the Mediterranean Sea, before it returned to Naval Station Norfolk.

On 28 May, the IAF bombed the Sanaa International Airport, with Al Masirah stating that it carried out four airstrikes. The airstrikes destroyed the last operational Yemenia airplane which Katz stated was also used to transport Houthi members. On 29 May, Israeli air defenses intercepted a ballistic missile launched from Yemen, with the Houthis stating that they had targeted the Ben Gurion Airport. In retaliation for the attack on Sanaa International Airport on 28 May, the Houthis warned on 30 May that they would target civilian aircraft operated by Israeli carriers as well.

On 14 June, the IDF stated that it had targeted Muhammad Abd al-Karim al-Ghamari, the Chief of the General Staff of the pro-Houthi faction of the Yemeni Armed Forces. An Israeli official later stated that he had been wounded in the attack, though this was denied by the Houthis. Mohammed al-Bukhaiti, a member of the Houthi political bureau, stated on 17 June that the group would intervene to help Iran against Israel and was coordinating with it in its conflict against Israel. The Houthis on 21 June also threatened to target American ships in the Red Sea if the US attacked Iran alongside Israel.

On 6 July, the IAF began extensive overnight airstrikes against sites in Yemen codenamed Operation Black Flag, targeting the ports of Al Hudaydah, Ras Isa, and Salif, as well as the Ras Kanatib power plant. The hijacked Galaxy Leader on which the Houthis had installed a radar to track international shipping according to the IDF, was also targeted.. Germany stated on 8 July that one of its aircraft which was a part of Operation Aspides, was targeted by a People's Liberation Army Navy warship with laser earlier in the month.

The IDF stated on 21 July that the IAF attacked Houthi military infrastructure and engineering equipment being used by the group for repairs at the Hudaydah Port using UAVs. Later, the IDF stated that a UAV apparently launched from Yemen was intercepted by the IAF. On 22 July, with Houthis claiming responsibility, the US sanctioned a Houthi-linked network of two individuals and five entities engaging in petroleum smuggling as well as evading sanctions. On 24 August, the IAF struck a military complex housing the Presidential Palace of Yemen, a fuel depot and two power stations in Sanaa. Ten people were killed and 102 wounded in the attacks according to the Houthi-run Health Ministry. On 28 August, the IAF carried out airstrikes on a compound in Sanaa targeting the Houthi leadership, killing Houthi Prime Minister Ahmed al-Rahawi and a number of other Houthi ministers.

Eighteen UN staff members were arrested by the Houthis on 31 August. The group later accused them of espionage. On 5 October, Houthis detained nine more UN staff members. The Houthis detained twenty UN workers on 19 October on accusations of espionage, while releasing another eleven after questioning. On October 25, the group detained two more UN staff members. The Houthis stated that many of those detained would be tried for links to the Israeli assassination of their leaders in August 2025.

On 10 September, the IAF carried out airstrikes on Sanaa and Al Hazm in the Al Jawf Governorate. The Houthi-run health ministry stated that 46 people were killed and 165 wounded in the attack. 31 journalists and media staff when a newspaper complex housing three Houthi-linked media outlets was struck according to the Committee to Protect Journalists. On 25 September, the IAF carried out airstrikes in Sanaa, with the IDF stating that it struck five military headquarters, including the headquarters of the Houthi general staff and the propaganda department, and two weapon storage facilities. Al Masirah stated that they struck the Dhahban power station, areas in As Sabain and Ma'ain districts, and a residential neighborhood, killing eight people and wounding 142 others.

On 16 October, the Houthis announced that Muhammad Abd al-Karim al-Ghamari, the Chief of the General Staff of the pro-Houthi faction of the Yemeni Armed Forces who had been targeted alongside other Houthi leaders in late-August 2025, had died, without disclosing the circumstances surrounding his death. The Israeli government claimed responsibility for his death.

Following the implementation of the ceasefire in the Gaza Strip in October 2025, the Houthis paused their attacks on Israel.

== 2026 ==
The Houthis on 28 February 2026 announced that they would resume their attacks on Israel and commercial ships in the Red Sea following the airstrikes by Israel and the United States on Iran. On 5 March, Houthi leader Abdul-Malik al-Houthi said in a recorded address that his group stands with Iran in the ongoing war and is prepared to take action if developments require it, warning that the group remains ready to intervene if the situation escalates further.

The Houthis launched a ballistic missile at Israel on 28 March which was intercepted by Israeli air defenses, marking the resumption of the group's attacks. The Houthis claimed that they targeted sensitive Israeli military sites and was cooperating with Hezbollah and Iran, adding that the attacks would continue until the conflict against all Axis of Resistance fronts stopped. The group later launched a second missile attack at Israel. The Houthis on 1 April also threatened to close the Bab-el-Mandeb again should "the aggression against Iran and Lebanon escalate savagely" or if the Gulf Arab states directly joined the war against Iran.

On 13 July, the Houthis launched a missile attack on Saudi Arabia in response to an attack on the Sanaa International Airport, marking the first time the group attacked the country since March 2022. The Houthis continued carrying out attacks on Saudi infrastructure and commercial ships over the following weeks.

== See also ==
- Tanker War – Series of military attacks by Iran and Iraq against merchant vessels in the Persian Gulf and Strait of Hormuz from 1984 to 1988.
- Guanbi policy – A military blockade policy of the government of the Republic of China (ROC) against the Chinese Communist Party (CCP) in the Communist-controlled Zone and later, the newly established People's Republic of China (PRC), with the naval traffic blockade lasting until 12 September 1979 (while the regulation on the vessels, crew and owner companies was abolished on 15 January 1992). The privateering of foreign vessels by the Kuomintang government occurred even in international waters.
