= Marib–Ras Isa oil pipeline =

Main oil pipeline in Yemen

Marib – Ras Isa oil pipeline

Location
- Country: Yemen
- Start: Marib oil field
- To: Ras Isa terminal

General information
- Type: Crude oil
- Operator: SAFER Exploration & Production Operations Company
- Construction started: 1986
- Commissioned: 1987

Technical information
- Length: 438 km (272 mi)
- Diameter: 24 in (610 mm)

The Marib – Ras Isa oil pipeline (also known as Marib pipeline) is the main oil pipeline in Yemen. It runs from the Ma'rib oil refinery to FSO Safer, an offshore storage and offloading facility, offshore from As-Salif.

Feasibility study of the pipeline was conducted in 1985. Construction started in September 1986 and the pipeline was commissioned in 1987. The pipeline was sabotaged during the 2011 Yemeni revolution and was shut in October 2011. The reparation works were concluded on 15 July 2012.

The pipeline is 438 kilometres (272 mi) long and it uses pipes with diameter of 24 and 36 inches (610 and 910 mm). It has a capacity of 200,000 barrels per day (32,000 m^{3}/d). The pipeline and terminal are operated by the SAFER Exploration & Production Operations Company.

On April 17, 2025, the oil port was destroyed by bombing by the United States Armed Forces.
