= United Nations Security Council Resolution 2722 =

United Nations Security Council Resolution adopted in 2024

UN Security Council Resolution 2722
- Date: 10 January 2024
- Meeting no.: 9,527
- Code: S/RES/2722 (Document)
- Subject: Maintenance of international peace and security
- Voting summary: 11 voted for; None voted against; 4 abstained
- Result: Adopted

Security Council composition
- Permanent members: China; France; Russia; United Kingdom; United States
- Non-permanent members: Algeria; Ecuador; Guyana; Japan; South Korea; Malta; Mozambique; Sierra Leone; Slovenia; Switzerland

United Nations Security Council Resolution 2722 was adopted on 10 January 2024. According to the resolution, the Security Council called for the Houthis in Yemen to immediately cease all attacks on merchant and commercial vessels and to release the captured ship Galaxy Leader and its crew.

Algeria, China, Mozambique and Russia abstained from voting.

Two days later the United States and the United Kingdom, with support from Australia, Bahrain, Canada, New Zealand, the Netherlands and South Korea, launched a series of air and missile strikes against the Houthis.

== See also ==
- Red Sea crisis
- List of United Nations Security Council Resolutions 2701 to 2800 (2023–present)
