= September 2025 Israeli attacks in Yemen =

Israeli airstrike in Yemen

- Part of the 2025 Israeli attacks in Yemen amidst the Red Sea crisis, and the Middle Eastern crisis (2023–present)
- Type: Airstrikes
- Location: Sanaa and Al Jawf Governorate, Yemen
- Target: Civilian structures and alleged Houthi bases
- Date: 10 September 2025
- Executed by: Israel Defense Forces; Israeli Air Force
- Casualties: 46 killed 165 injured

On 10 September 2025, Israel carried out a series of airstrikes against various targets between Sanaa and Al Jawf Governorate, Yemen, killing 46 people and wounding 165 more. During the strikes, the Committee to Protect Journalists reported that 31 media workers were killed, making it the deadliest attack on journalists since the Maguindanao massacre.

== Attacks ==
Civilian and residential areas were attacked in Sanaa's al-Tahrir neighbourhood; homes were also hit. A medical facility on 60th Street in the southwest of the city was bombed, as well a government compound in al-Jawf’s capital, al-Hazm, and the headquarters of two newspapers. Houthi military spokesman Yahya Saree said that the group used surface-to-air missiles against the Israeli incursion, saying that some Israeli planes were turned back before they were able to discharge their weapons. Israel reported that they also attacked "military camps in which operatives of the Houthis were identified". The National Museum of Yemen also sustained damage from the attacks.

At around 4:45 p.m. local time, Israeli strikes hit a complex housing Houthi-linked media outlets in Sanaa, killing 31 journalists from three different agencies, including the Al-Yemen and 26 September newspapers. The IDF said that it hit the public relations headquarters of the Houthi army, which was responsible for propaganda efforts and publishing speeches by senior Houthi figures such as Abdul-Malik al-Houthi and Yahya Saree. No evidence was provided for the claim. According to the Committee to Protect Journalists, the strike was the second deadliest attack on journalists it had recorded, surpassed only by the Maguindanao massacre in the Philippines, and the deadliest on journalists in the Middle East.

A funeral for the slain journalists was held on 16 September.

== See also ==
- Israeli war crimes
- List of journalists killed in the Gaza war
- List of massacres in Yemen
- Timeline of the Red Sea crisis
- US–UK airstrikes on Yemen
