= 29 September 2024 Israeli attacks on Yemen =

Israeli attacks against multiple targets in Yemen

- Part of the Red Sea crisis and the Middle Eastern crisis (2023–present)
- Type: Airstrikes
- Locations: Al Hudaydah, Yemen; Ras Isa, Yemen
- Target: Power plants, fuel facilities
- Date: 29 September 2024
- Executed by: Israel Defense Forces: Israeli Air Force
- Casualties: 6 dead, 57+ injured

On 29 September 2024, Israel launched attacks in Yemen against the ports of Al Hudaydah and Ras Isa, both located in the Houthi-controlled part of the country, using F-15I, F-35I Adir, and F-16I aircraft. Six people were killed and at least 57 were injured. Widespread power outages were caused in the city of Hodeida itself. The attacks caused significant damage to Yemeni port facilities and power generating stations.

The Israeli attacks were in response to the fire of a ballistic missile by the Houthis directed at Israel's Ben Gurion International Airport a day before, that was intercepted by Israel. The Houthis said their missile attacks are part of a broader campaign to express solidarity with the people of Gaza and Lebanon. This was the second major Israeli retaliatory strike against the Houthis since Operation Outstretched Arm on 20 July 2024, which saw Israeli aircraft attacking the Al Hudaydah port.

== Background ==
=== War in Yemen ===
The Houthi movement, officially "Ansar Allah", is an Islamist group in Yemen that follows the Shiite Zaydi faith. The movement has been fueled by decades of discrimination against the Shi'ites in Yemen and took power in 2014. In 2015, Saudi Arabia and its allies, with American support, launched a war against the Houthis, and imposed a naval and air blockade. The resulting famine has claimed the lives of an estimated 150,000 people. They were designated a terrorist organization by the United States, Saudi Arabia, United Arab Emirates, Malaysia, and Australia. The group has called for the destruction of Israel. The movement, whose militants oppose Yemen's internationally recognized government, has controlled a considerable swath of the country's territory along the Red Sea since 2014.

=== Spillover of the Israel–Hamas war ===
After the 2023 Hamas-led attack on Israel and subsequent Israeli invasion and bombardment of the Gaza Strip, the Houthis launched retaliatory attacks on Israel, promising to continue them until "Israeli aggression stops."

Houthi attacks on international shipping vessels in the Red Sea were deemed by some as international piracy, drawing a military response from a number of countries. In January 2024, the UN Security Council adopted Resolution 2722, condemning the Houthi attacks and affirming freedom of navigation. The United States-led Operation Prosperity Guardian was launched to protect Red Sea shipping. Since 12 January, the US and UK have led coalition air and missile strikes against the Houthis, while other countries are independently patrolling the waters near Yemen.

On 19 July a drone launched by Houthi militants from Yemen hit Tel Aviv, killing one person and injuring 10 others.

The next day, Israel attacked the Hodeidah port in Yemen, killing 14 people and injuring 90. Houthi officials condemned the Israeli attacks, and said they will not stop until what they called "the genocide in Gaza" is stopped. Among those killed in the Israeli attacks were 12 employees of the Yemen Petroleum Corporation. The attacks reportedly targeted a power station, and caused power outages for the local population.

On September 28 2024, the Houthis launched a ballistic missile from Yemen towards Ben Gurion Airport in Israel, prompting air raid sirens in Tel Aviv and most of Central Israel.

== Attacks ==
The Israeli military said it used dozens of aircraft, including fighter jets, refuelers and spy planes, to make the attacks some 1,800 km from Israel.

=== Targets ===
According to early reports the targets were fuel facilities, power stations and docks at the Ras Issa and Hodeidah ports. The attacks killed one port worker and three electrical engineers. Residents said the attacks power outages in most of Hodeidah.

Israel acknowledged that the ports are used to import oil, but said they are also used to import weapons and the oil can be used for military purposes.

== Reactions ==
Iran's Foreign Ministry condemned the airstrikes, labeling them "inhumane" and accusing the United States of backing Israeli attacks against civilian facilities.

Israeli defence minister tweeted “Our message is clear, for us, no place is too far” in reference to the long distance traversed to conduct the attacks.

== See also ==
- December 2024 Israeli airstrikes in Yemen
- 20 July 2024 Israeli attack on Yemen
- 2024 missile strikes in Yemen – missile strikes by the United States and the United Kingdom on Houthi controlled parts of Yemen
- Operation Wooden Leg – the most distant publicly known airstrike undertaken by the Israel Defense Forces
- Operation Opera – another long-distance airstrike undertaken by the IDF
