= July 2024 Houthi–Israel attacks =

Airstrikes against the Houthis

- Part of the Red Sea crisis and the Middle Eastern crisis (2023–present)
- Type: Drone attack
- Location: Tel Aviv, Israel
- Target: Apartment building in Tel Aviv
- Date: 19 July 2024
- Executed by: Houthi movement
- Casualties: 1 killed, 10 injured

20 July 2024 Israeli attack on Yemen
- Part of the Red Sea crisis and the Middle Eastern crisis (2023–present)
- Location within Yemen
- Type: Airstrike
- Location: Al Hudaydah, Yemen
- Target: one power plant, fuel storage belonging to Yemen Petroleum Corporation, container crane
- Date: 20 July 2024
- Executed by: Israel Defense Forces; Israeli Air Force
- Casualties: 14 killed (including 12 employees of Yemen Petroleum Corporation), 90+ injured, 6 missing

On 19 July 2024, Houthi militants in Yemen performed a drone attack on Israel, hitting an apartment building near the U.S. Embassy branch office in Tel Aviv, Israel's economic center in Ben Yehuda Street. The drone strike killed one person in his apartment building, and injured 10 others. The drone was spotted but not intercepted due to what Israel attributed to human error, with the Houthis asserting that they had developed a drone with the ability to evade the Iron Dome. The air raid siren was also not activated.

The attack is reportedly the first successful one by the Houthis to hit its target, with previous attempts being intercepted by either Israeli defenses or Western allies located in the region.

The following day, the Israel Defense Forces (IDF) responded with an attack on Hudaydah Port in Al Hudaydah, Yemen. The attack damaged a power generating station, an oil refinery, fuel storage facilities belonging to the Yemen Petroleum Corporation (YPC), and port cranes. Israel claimed it targeted weapon storage facilities. 14 people were killed, including 12 port employees and more than 90 were injured, many with severe burns.

The attack was codenamed by the IDF as Operation Outstretched Arm (Hebrew: מבצע יד ארוכה). Houthi officials condemned the Israeli bombing of Al Hudaydah, promised retaliation, and said that this would "increase our determination to stop the genocide in Gaza".

The operation marks the first time Israel directly attacked Yemen. It used F-15 and F-35I jet fighters, along with Boeing 707 jets for aerial refueling. Commentators have noted the significance of the operation, emphasizing that it involved targets 1,700 kilometers from Israel, approximately 200 kilometers farther than Tehran, showcasing the extended reach of Israeli military operations.

== Background ==
=== War in Yemen ===
The Houthi movement, officially "Ansar Allah", is Islamist group in Yemen that follows the Shiite Zaydi faith. The movement has been fueled by decades of discrimination against the Shi'ites in Yemen and took power in 2014. In response, it was attacked by Saudi Arabia and its allies, in a war that killed 150,000 people. They were designated a terrorist organization by the United States, Saudi Arabia, United Arab Emirates, Malaysia, and Australia. The group has called for the destruction of Israel. The movement, whose militants oppose Yemen's internationally recognized government, has controlled a considerable swath of the country's territory along the Red Sea since 2014.

=== Houthi attacks on Israel ===
The Houthis have long called for the destruction of Israel but did not take direct action against it until Hamas's October 7 attacks which initiated the Gaza war. Since the war began, the Iran-backed Houthi forces have launched drone and missile attacks toward Israel, though most were intercepted, causing minimal damage. The Houthis stated these attacks are in retaliation for Israeli bombing of the Gaza Strip and vowed to continue until the "Israeli aggression stops."

On 19 October 2023, Houthis fired a barrage of rockets and drones into Israeli territory that were intercepted by USS Carney. Israel's Arrow missile defense system saw its first use in combat on 31 October, intercepting Houthi weapons. Subsequently, the Houthis intensified their attacks on ships in the Red Sea that they considered associated with Israel or its foreign allies, disrupting one of the world's busiest shipping lanes. These attacks were deemed by some as international piracy, drawing a military response from a number of countries. In December 2023, the United States and several Western allies launched operations in the Red Sea to thwart attacks on ships originating from Yemeni territory and to ensure the security of shipping routes. Despite these efforts, the campaign largely fell short of its goals. In January 2024, the UN Security Council adopted Resolution 2722, condemning the Houthi attacks and affirming freedom of navigation. Since 12 January 2024, the US and UK have led coalition air and missile strikes against the Houthis, while other countries are independently patrolling the waters near Yemen.

== Events ==
=== 19 July drone attack on Tel Aviv ===
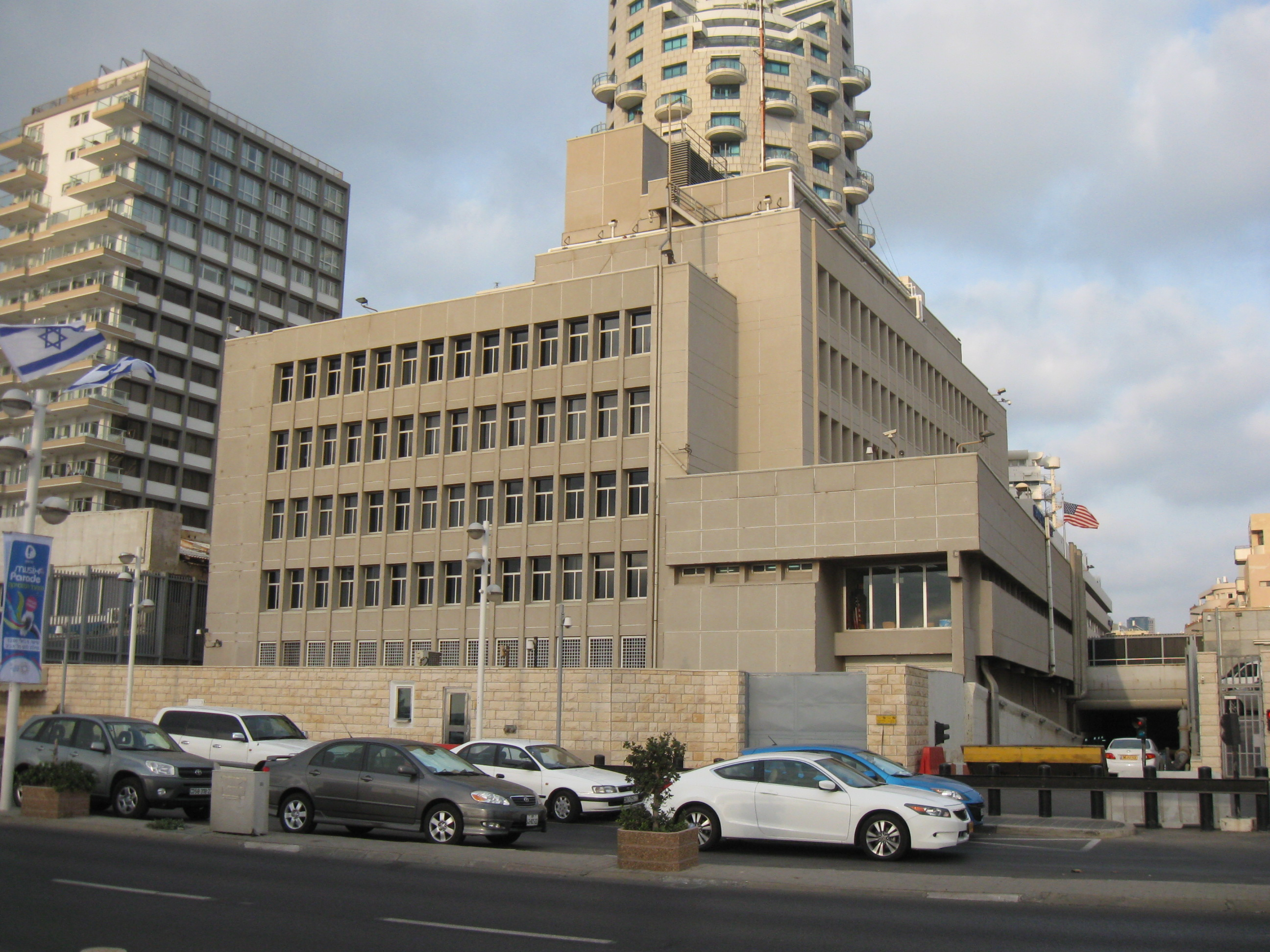
The US Embassy branch office in Tel Aviv. The attack took place in the vicinity of the compound

On 19 July, a drone launched by Houthi militants from Yemen hit an apartment building near the US Embassy branch office in Tel Aviv, Israel's economic center. The drone strike killed one person in his apartment building, and injured 10 others. The drone is suspected by the IDF to have been an Iranian-made Samad-3 modified by the Houthis to carry more fuel (for a longer range) in exchange for a smaller warhead. According to Israel, the drone was spotted but not intercepted and no air raid siren was sounded due to human error.

The Houthi military spokesperson, Yahya Saree, stated that the aircraft was a new drone type, named "Yafa" or "Jaffa" that was able to fly "undetected through Israel's extensive air defence systems." Their claim was challenged by Fabian Hinz, a researcher at the International Institute for Strategic Studies. The Houthis also described the attack on Tel Aviv as the beginning of the fifth phase of their conflict with Israel.

According to The Associated Press news agency, this was the Houthis' first successful strike on Israel with the others being "intercepted by either Israeli defenses or Western allies with forces stationed in the region." Likewise, According to Ibrahim al-Marashi, associate professor at California State University, the Houthi attack marked both a technical and symbolic victory in that it marked the first time the group had entered Israeli territory since hostilities began in October 2023, evading Israeli air defense systems and causing damage.

Video from the blast site revealed shattered glass scattered across the sidewalks, while onlookers gathered near a building marked by the explosion. The area was cordoned off with police tape. IDF said it had initiated an investigation into the drone attack causing a "large explosion" near the U.S. embassy office and would determine why the country's air defense systems were not activated to intercept the "aerial target". Houthi militants said that the attack on Tel Aviv as the beginning of the fifth phase of their conflict with Israel.

==== Reactions ====
- Houthis: Houthis spokesman Yahya Saree claimed responsibility for the attack and vowed to continue targeting Israel in solidarity with Palestinians in the Gaza war.
- Hezbollah: Hezbollah hailed the event as a victory for the "oppressed Palestinian people" and their fighters. They mentioned that Yemeni fighters were backing the "brave Palestinian fighters" in Gaza, who are "defending all the people and nations of the Arab and Islamic world".
- Israel: Israeli defense minister Yoav Gallant vowed to respond to the Houthi attack. Israeli aircraft struck military and oil refining facilities at the Hudaydah Port in retaliation the next day. Israeli opposition leader Yair Lapid said the attack further demonstrated the current government's inability to provide security for Israeli citizens.
- United States: The U.S. condemned the strike, calling it "the latest in the Houthis' reckless and destabilizing actions."
- European Union: The EU said it "firmly condemns the indiscriminate Houthi-claimed drone attack on Tel Aviv." Spokeswoman Nabila Massrali said that "International Humanitarian Law strictly prohibits indiscriminate shelling of civilian population centers and applies to all actors at all times without exception."
- United Nations: UN Secretary-General António Guterres said he was "deeply concerned about the risk such dangerous acts pose for further escalation in the region," urging "maximum restraint."

=== Israeli response ===
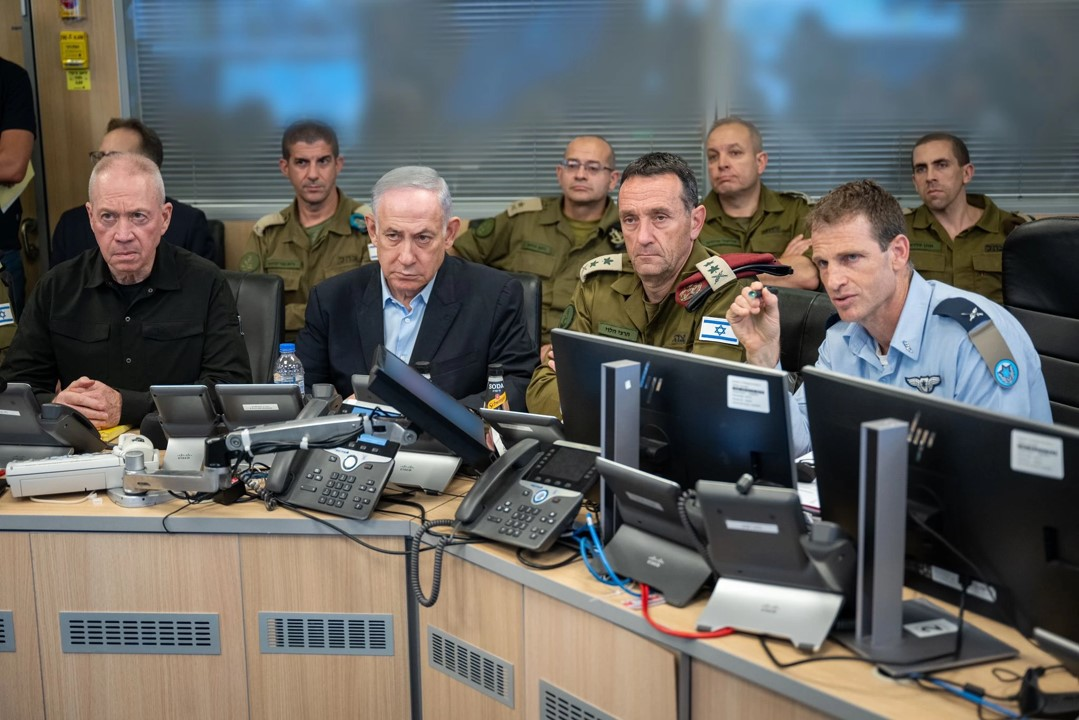
Israeli Air force pit in Kirya during the attack in Yemen. In the first row, from right to left: Chief of Staff Herzi Halevi, Prime Minister Benjamin Netanyahu, Defense Minister Yoav Gallant

Israel's Defense Ministry stated that the operational plans for the strikes on Yemen were reviewed and approved on 20 July morning, with Defense Minister Yoav Gallant, IDF Chief of Staff Herzi Halevi, and other top defense officials overseeing the discussions. The Israeli cabinet convened for a special emergency meeting, with ministers summoned on short notice, to approve the operation. The cabinet meeting, chaired by Defense Minister Yoav Gallant and Chief of Staff Herzl Halevi, was conducted under strict censorship.

The Israeli attack commenced at 6pm local time. The attacks hit a refinery, electricity power station, fuel storage facilities, cranes, and equipment belonging to humanitarian aid agencies. (Hudaydah port has been used to supply humanitarian aid to Yemen). Nine port employees of the Yemen Petroleum Company were killed, and 87 people were injured, most of them with severe burns. Witnesses (about 2 miles, 3.2 km from the bombed areas) reported about 12 separate blasts in two barrages, and said the Israeli attack was so intense it reminded them of the Saudi bombing of the city in 2015.

==== Targets ====
The Israeli attacks specifically targeted an electricity generation station, according to local Yemeni channel Al-Masirah TV (run by the Houthis). Other expert also confirmed attacks on the power station. Residents confirmed widespread power outages. A Middle East expert at Navanti Group said power shortages will increase suffering of the local population.

A fire described as "huge" was created after Israel bombed a refinery and fuel storage depots at the port, belonging to the Yemen Petroleum Company (YPC). It was estimated the fuel storage contained more than 100,000 litres (22,000 imp gal; 26,000 US gal) of fuel. Some of the fuel was owned by YPC, while the rest was owned by independent Yemeni businesses. The Houthis, who form the government in Hudaydah, have also been known to make money off fuel sales in Yemen.

Israel also hit cranes at the harbor. The World Food Programme reported damage to a crane its aid vessel was using. There were other merchant vessels adjacent to the cranes the IDF struck, and its not clear the extent of their damage. The warzone reported that Hudaydah port had just two heavy dockside cranes, and both were severely damaged by Israel. Their loss will considerably slow down humanitarian shipments into Yemen. Israel, however, claims these cranes were used to unload Iranian weapons and published footage of destroying the cranes.

American and Israeli officials claimed that Israel only targeted Houthi military sites in the area of the port, used for weapon storage. According to these officials, Israel attacked the Hudaydah Port because it is used for transfers of weapons from Iran, and facilitates export and import of goods.

Images and videos posted on social media have shown flames and smoke rising in the city. Fires continued to burn, with smoke lingering, for several days after the attack.

==== Military logistics ====
The airstrike involved complex logistical and tactical measures due to the significant distance of 1,700 kilometers (1,100 mi) from Israel. The operation used aerial refueling with Boeing 707 "Re'em" aircraft, low-altitude flights to evade enemy radar, and possibly coordination with Saudi Arabia. The airstrikes mark the first time Israel has attacked Yemen. The IDF's task force included aerial intelligence and surveillance by the "Nachshon" squadron, naval support from warships and possibly a submarine in the Red Sea, and the use of "stand-off" munitions from a range of 100 kilometers (62 mi). The primary strike force comprised F-35I "Adir" and F-15 fighters.

The Israeli government awaited the return of the aircraft before confirming responsibility for the operation.

==== Involvement of other countries ====
Saudi Arabian outlet Al Arabiya said the bombing was a joint operation between Israel, the US and the UK. US officials denied involvement. The Guardian noted that US forces had bombed Hudaydah as recently as June 2024.

Israeli news outlet Yedioth Ahronoth reported that Israel likely coordinated the attack with Saudi authorities, given the proximity of Saudi airspace to the likely route Israeli jets took to reach Yemen.

==== Firefighting and repairs ====
Firefighting teams arrived immediately to the port, but struggled to contain the blaze. The fire had expanded and threatened both humanitarian ships and food storage facilities. Meanwhile, Yemeni port authorities kept other parts of the port facilities functional to receive ships carrying food, medicine and fuel. Yemeni human rights group, Mwatana, reported that some additional casualties may be buried under the rubble and could not be reached due to the fires.

Repairs on the power plant damaged by Israel were started, as authorities tried to bring back electricity to the Yemeni people.

Two container ships docked at the port on 23 July, making them the first merchant vessels to use the port since the Israeli airstrikes. By 28 July, the port had become fully operational.

The Yemen Red Sea Ports Corporation, which runs the Hudaydah Port, estimated that the strikes caused over US$20,000,000 in damages, excluding losses caused by the destruction of fuel storage facilities. Two cranes and a small vessel were destroyed, while damage was caused to nearby buildings and docks.

==== Reactions ====
- Israel: Prime Minister Benjamin Netanyahu said that the strikes targeted the port because it was used for the military purposes and that they displayed that "there is no place that the long arm of the state of Israel will not reach." Israeli military spokesperson Daniel Hagari claimed responsibility for the attacks on behalf of the Israeli Defense Forces, stating that Israeli fighter jets struck Houthi military targets "in response to the hundreds of attacks against the State of Israel in recent months" to "send a message". Foreign Minister Israel Katz said that the strikes served as a warning to Iran and dealt a "severe blow to Iran's terrorist branch in Yemen". Defense Minister Yoav Gallant stated, "the blood of Israeli citizens has a price," and emphasized that any attack on Israelis will be met with a response "identical" to those in Lebanon and Gaza. Gallant added, "The fire that is currently burning in Hodeidah is seen across the Middle East and the significance is clear." He further noted, "The first time that they harmed an Israeli citizen, we struck them. And we will do this in any place where it may be required."
- Houthis: Houthi spokesperson Nasruddin Amer referred to the attacks as "a brutal Israeli aggression" specifically meant to cause suffering to the Yemeni population and force the Houthis to stop support for Gaza during the Gaza war. He stated that the attacks would only increase the Yemeni population's resolve in supporting Gaza and their willingness to face hardship for their sake. Chief Houthi negotiator reiterated this sentiment in a public statement. Houthi policymaker Mohammed al-Bukhaiti stated that the airstrike would only increase Yemeni military operations conducted against Israel until the war ended, stating that they would "meet escalation with escalation", he also stated that "the Zionist entity will pay the price for targeting civilian facilities, and we will meet escalation with escalation". Houthi officials said "This will increase our determination to stop the genocide in Gaza."
- Iran: The country condemned the attack, a foreign ministry spokesperson warned about a possibility for a wider regional conflict and calls Israeli allies responsible for the attack.
- Hamas: The group condemned the attack. A member of the political bureau, Izzat al-Rishq, stated that "the occupation state will undoubtedly be burned by the fire ignited in Hudaydah today, and the mounting Zionist crimes will change the entire equation".
- Hezbollah: The group called the operation a "foolish step" and said that it sparked a new and dangerous phase of confrontation across the Middle East.
- Iraq: The foreign ministry condemned the attacks which targeted oil and civilian facilities, including Al Hodeidah port and the electricity company, leading to the deaths and injuries of civilians. They considered the attack a dangerous escalation which threatened stability in the region. Iraq affirmed its full solidarity with the Yemeni people, and holds the Israeli entity responsible for any military escalation in the region.
- Kuwait: The foreign ministry condemned the attack, stating that Israel's actions contribute to the "undermining of international efforts aimed at ending the cycle of violence" in the region.
- Oman: The foreign ministry condemned the attack, stating that the attack "represents a new escalation of tension in the region that would further complicate the regional situation and hinder efforts to calm the situation".
- Saudi Arabia: Defense ministry spokesperson Turki Al-Maliki said that Saudi Arabia was not involved in the attack, adding that Saudi Arabia will not allow its airspace to be infiltrated by any party.
- United Nations: Secretary-General Antonio Guterres has expressed deep concern over Israel's attack on Yemen.
- United States: A spokesperson for the US National Security Council stated that the US had not coordinated with Israel on the airstrikes, adding that the country fully recognizes Israel's right to self-defense.
- Yemen: The internationally recognized government condemned the Israeli attack but also cautioned the Houthis against dragging the people of Yemen "into absurd battles in the interests of the Iranian regime," and warned Iran and Israel not to turn the country into "an arena for their absurd wars and their subversive projects in the region."

===== Media =====
According to Yedioth Ahronoth, the operation was meant as a deterrent to the pro-Iranian government in Sanaa and as a signal to the US-UK coalition that the IDF will no longer rely solely on allied air defense.

According to The Washington Post, analysts from Yemen determined that the operation would likely not deter the Houthis, but would instead enable them to mobilize Yemenis to fight against a perceived foreign threat, consolidating their local support.

The Economist wrote that with its strikes, "Israel was trying not only to deter the Houthis. It was also sending a message to Iran: Hodeidah, after all, is farther away from Israel than most of Iran’s big cities."

The Jerusalem Post observed that the operation bore similarities to the 1985 Operation Wooden Leg, where the Israeli Air Force targeted PLO sites in Tunisia, 2,200 kilometers from Israel. It emphasized the role of the F-35s in the 2024 operation, noting their stealth capabilities were crucial for striking the Houthis, who already used anti-aircraft missile systems to shoot down American UAVs. The Post described the operation as "an important milestone" for the F-35s within the Israeli Air Force, marking eight years since their initial deployment in Israel.

The Human Rights Watch called the strikes a possible war crime since they were apparently an "indiscriminate or disproportionate attack on civilians".

== Aftermath ==
On the morning of 21 July, the IDF intercepted a missile fired from Yemen. Rocket and missile sirens sounded in Eilat, however the IDF stated that the city was not targeted and denied reports of an explosion. The Houthis stated that they had targeted Eilat with several missiles.

On 29 September 2024, following the Houthi missile launch on Ben-Gurion International Airport near Tel Aviv that came in retaliation to the 2024 Hezbollah headquarters strike, Israel launched another attack on Hodeidah port and power station, killing at least 4 civilians. Over 10 airstrikes struck the port, causing major explosions that reverberated throughout the city. The strikes reportedly targeted oil tanks at Ras Issa port and other facilities. According to the IDF the Houthi regime facilitates the transfer of Iranian weapons and supplies to the region, including oil, for military purposes.

== See also ==
- December 2024 Israeli airstrikes in Yemen
- 29 September 2024 Israeli attacks on Yemen
- 2024 missile strikes in Yemen – missile strikes by the United States and the United Kingdom on Houthi controlled parts of Yemen
- Operation Wooden Leg – the most distant publicly known airstrike undertaken by the Israel Defense Forces
- Operation Opera – another long-distance airstrike undertaken by the IDF
- List of massacres in Yemen
- September 2025 Israeli attacks in Yemen
