= December 2024 Israeli airstrikes in Yemen =

Israeli airstrikes against the Houthis

December 2024 Israeli airstrikes in Yemen Operation White City
- Part of the Red Sea crisis and the Middle Eastern crisis (2023–present)
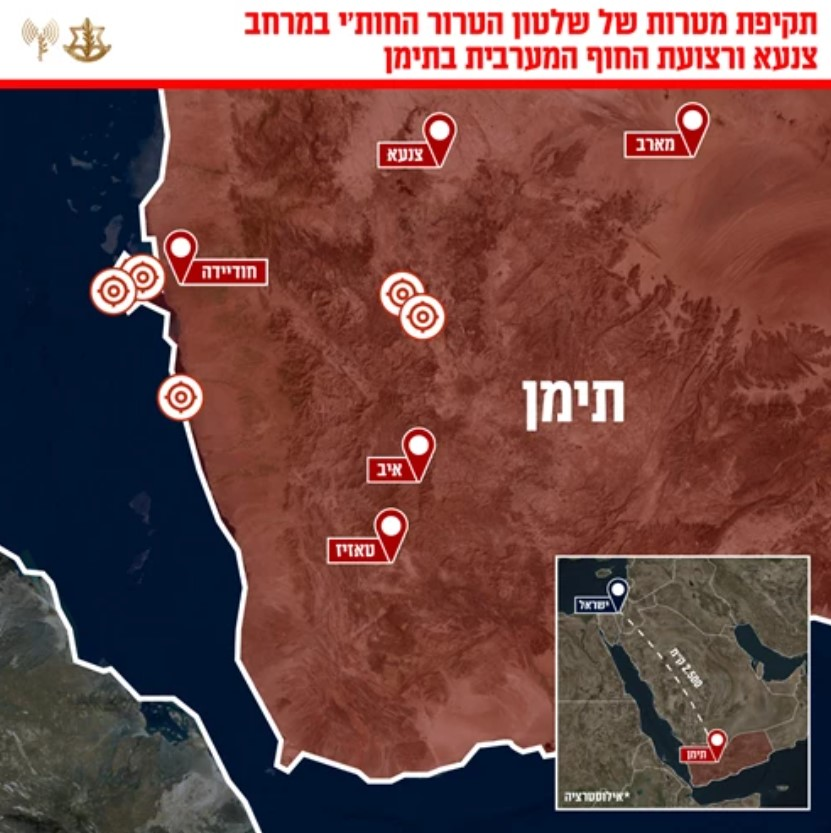
- Map of the 19 December airstrikes released by the Israel Defense Forces
- Type: Airstrikes
- Location: Al Hudaydah Governorate and Sanaa, Yemen
- Target: First Strikes: Port of as-Salif, Ras Isa oil facility, two power stations, eight tugboats Second strikes: Sanaa International Airport, Al-Dailami Air Base, Hudaydah Port, Haziz and Ras Qantib power stations
- Date: 19 and 26 December 2024
- Executed by: Israel Defense Forces: Israeli Air Force
- Casualties: 15 killed, 42+ wounded

In December 2024, Israel carried out several strikes against the Houthis, a Zaidi militia supported by Iran, in response to Houthi attacks on population centers in Israel. On the morning of 19 December 2024, Israel carried out several airstrikes in western Yemen in an operation dubbed Operation White City (Hebrew: מבצע העיר הלבנה), and on 26 December the Israeli Air Force conducted another air attack targeting Sanaa International Airport and the port of al-Hodeida. It was reported that the strikes were executed in cooperation with the U.S. and UK militaries.

At least nine civilians died, and three others were wounded in the attacks. The Israel Defense Forces struck a port and an oil facility near the capital Sanaa, used by the Houthis in their military operations, which it said was retaliation for Houthi drone and missile attacks on Israel. Houthi sources said that Israeli strikes targeted the Heyzaz and Dhahban power stations near Sanaa, as well as the Hudaydah Port and Ras Isa oil facility.

Between the attacks, Israeli prime minister Benjamin Netanyahu said that, "the Houthis will also learn what Hamas, Hezbollah, the Assad regime, and others have learned — and even if it takes time, this lesson will be learned across the entire Middle East."

== Background ==
Following the October 7 attacks in 2023 that killed 1,200 people, Israel responded with an offensive on the Gaza Strip that has killed over 45,000 Palestinians. In solidarity with the Palestinians, the Houthis launched a campaign of attacks against merchant ships that they claimed were linked to Israel, the United States, and the United Kingdom in the Red Sea and Gulf of Aden; however, many ships targeted held no links to the three countries. Two ships were sunk and four sailors were killed throughout the Houthi campaign. The Galaxy Leader was also hijacked.

The Houthis have also launched over 200 missiles and 170 drones at Israel, the majority of which were intercepted before reaching their targets. The strikes incurred Israeli airstrikes on Yemen in July and September.

On 20 July 2024, Israel conducted attacks on Hudaydah Port in Al Hudaydah, Yemen, claiming to have targeted Houthi infrastructure. They carried out an aerial bombing of alleged ammunition depots, oil storage facilities, and power stations. Israel struck targets Inside Yemen again in September and earlier in December.

The airstrikes had been planned for weeks in response to previous attacks on Israel and began within an hour from the time of arrival of a Houthi-fired ballistic missile into Israeli airspace. The missile caused the activation of the Israeli danger alarm system, and therefore disrupted the sleep of millions of Israelis, having to evacuate to a safe place. The missile was partially intercepted by the Arrow defense system. The missile's warhead, which didn't explode during the interception, hit a school building in Ramat Gan and detonated. Despite the heavy destruction to the building, there were no children inside (it was around 3 a.m.) and no human injuries were reported. Israeli planes were already in the air en route to Yemen at the time of the attack.

== Airstrikes ==
=== 19 December ===
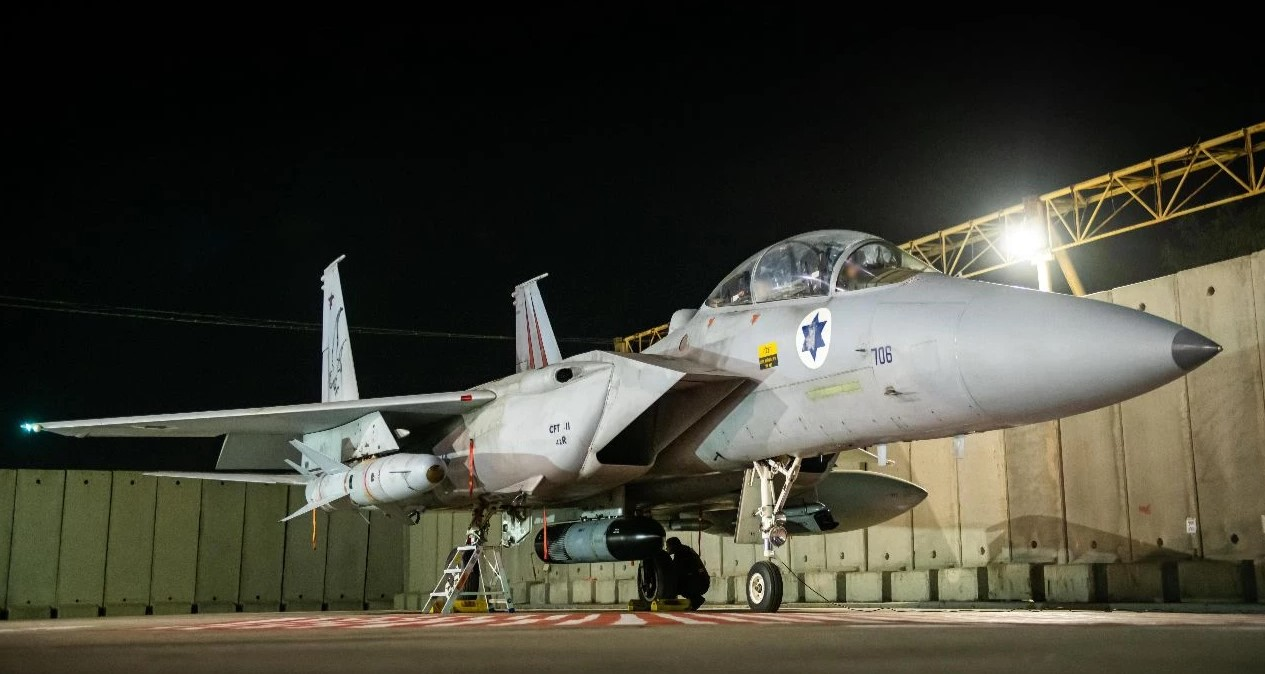
An Israeli fighter jet that participated in the airstrikes.

The strikes came in two waves and saw dozens of munitions dropped on five targets. Fourteen fighter jets alongside refuelers and surveillance aircraft participated in the operation. The aircraft departed at around 1:00 a.m. and embarked on a 1,800 kilometres (1,100 mi)-flight to Yemen. The strikes were conducted overnight due to operational concerns and attempts to improve intelligence on the targets. The first wave began at 3:15 a.m. and targeted Yemen's Red Sea coast, striking the ports of Hudaydah, Ras Isa, and Salif. Four air raids were reported on Al Hudaydah, including two that hit the Ras Isa oil terminal. Seven people were killed in as-Salif, two employees of the oil terminal were killed and another was injured in Ras Isa, and two people were injured in Hudaydah Port. The strikes also destroyed eight tugboats. The second wave, which occurred at 4:30 a.m., targeted the Dhahban and Heyzaz power plants—respectively located north and south of Sanaa. IDF spokesman Daniel Hagari said that the strikes targeted port and energy infrastructure used for military activity by the Houthis.

=== 26 December ===
The Israeli Air Force conducted a series of daylight strikes targeting Houthi-controlled infrastructure in Yemen, including Sanaa International Airport, Hudaydah port, and a power station near Sanaa. The operation dubbed as the Operation Sound of Vineyard, involving 25 aircraft, was aimed at maximizing damage while maintaining an element of surprise. Key targets included the airport's control tower, which was disabled. Reports indicate casualties and damage to infrastructure, with claims that some targets were civilian. Israeli officials, who informed the U.S. in advance, stated the strikes were a response to Houthi aggression, warning that further actions would follow if necessary. A second wave of attacks occurred shortly after the initial strikes. The attack included 7 strikes on Sanaa International Airport which took out the airport's control tower and damaged the runway, as well as 3 strikes on the port of Hodeidah and the Haziz and Ras Qantib power stations. Houthi owned media outlet Al Masirah reported that at least four people were killed and 16 others were injured in the attacks, three of them were killed at Sanaa International Airport and another person was killed at Ras Issa port. Three others were reported missing in Hodeidah. Several aircraft of the Yemeni Air Force-SPC captured during the Yemeni civil war were also amongst the targets. Al-Dailami Air Base was also reportedly struck. World Health Organization Director-General Tedros Adhanom Ghebreyesus and a United Nations team were about to board a plane at the Sanaa airport at the time of the strikes. A crew member on the plane was injured. The death toll later rose to six with an additional 40 being wounded.

On 26 December 2024, twenty-five Israeli Air Force aircraft struck multiple targets in the areas of Yemen controlled by the Houthi Movement, most notably on the capital's Sanaa International Airport. According to Israel, the attacks, which were part of their operation code-named Operation Tzelilei HaKerem (English: Operation Sounds of the Vineyard), were carried out in response to the firing of ballistic missiles and unmanned aerial vehicles (UAVs) toward Israel by the Houthi Movement. It took place as part of multiple Israeli airstrikes in Yemen in December amidst the Houthi involvement in the Gaza war.

CCTV footage of the Israeli strike on the airport

The airstrikes, which took place on 26 December, were carried out by 25 Israeli Air Force warplanes during a speech by Houthi leader Abdul-Malik al-Houthi. According to the Saudi state-owned Al Arabiya news channel, the airstrikes targeted the Sanaa International Airport, Hudaydah port, and a power station near Sanaa. The operation was aimed at maximizing damage while also maintaining an element of surprise. Key targets included the airport's control tower, which was disabled, and civilian aircraft allegedly used by the Houthi government. Reports indicated casualties and damage to infrastructure, with claims by the Houthi state controlled Al Masirah TV that some targets were civilian.

Israeli officials, who informed the United States of the attacks in advance, stated the strikes were a response to Houthi actions, warning that further actions would follow if they deemed it necessary. A second wave of attacks occurred shortly after the initial strikes. This attack included seven strikes on Sanaa International Airport which took out the airport's control tower and damaged the runway, as well as three strikes each on the port of Hodeidah, Ras Iffa Port and the Haziz and Ras Qantib power stations.

Houthi Movement owned media outlet Al-Masirah reported that at least three people were killed, and fourteen others injured in the attacks, three of them were killed at Sanaa International Airport and another person was killed at Ras Issa Port. Three others were reported missing in Hodeidah. Several fighter aircraft of the Yemeni Air Force-SPC were also amongst the targets; three of these aircraft were reported by Israeli media sources to have been destroyed. Al-Dailami Air Base was also struck by Israeli aircraft. One of the two remaining naval tugs under the command of Yemeni Navy-SPC was also destroyed.

World Health Organization Director-General Tedros Adhanom Ghebreyesus and a United Nations team were about to board a plane at the Sanaa airport at the time of the strikes. A crew member on the plane was injured. The death toll later rose to six, with an additional forty being wounded.

This was the largest strike carried out by Israel in Yemeni territory since the beginning of the Gaza war, following three previous operations: the 20 July 2024 attack, the September 2024 strike, and the December 2024 strikes.

== Reactions ==
- Israel: Israeli Prime Minister Benjamin Netanyahu said that by striking the Houthis, Israel was protecting not just itself but the entire world from the Houthi attacks on international shipping and trade routes. President Isaac Herzog thanked his troops, saying that they dealt a heavy blow on the Houthis, who he said intended "to harm [Israel] and the entire region". Defense Minister Israel Katz warned that Houthi leaders would also be targeted. Sources in Israel's defense establishment stated that the strike marks the start of a larger campaign against the Houthis. The IDF raised the readiness level of its air defense systems and the Air Force, in anticipation of a possible Houthi response. Soon after the second wave of airstrikes on Yemen, the Houthi Movement launched a ballistic missile at Tel Aviv, causing sirens to sound across central Israel, the fate of the missile was unclear as the IDF refused to provide further details.
- Iran: Iranian foreign ministry spokesman Esmaeil Baghaei said that the strikes were a violation of international law and the Charter of the United Nations.
- Houthi movement: Houthi political official Mohammed al-Bukhaiti vowed that the Houthis would "escalate our military targeting of Israel" until it stopped "the genocide in Gaza."
- United Nations: UN secretary general António Guterres expressed that he's "gravely concerned" by the intensified escalation and Israeli strikes on the airports and ports, which he said were "especially alarming" as they posed "grave risks to humanitarian operations" in Yemen.

Two days after the initial Israeli airstrikes on Yemen, the Yemeni Houthis launched a ballistic missile, successfully impacting Tel Aviv, Israel in a rare instance of failed interception over in the sky. The missile landed on a playground, causing 18 injuries by broken glass fragments and in evacuating to seek shelter. The Houthis claimed it was a hypersonic ballistic missile named 'Palestine-2' and was directed at an Israeli military target in the Tel Aviv area.

After the second Israeli wave of airstrikes on Yemen, the Yemeni Houthis launched another ballistic missile at Tel Aviv, causing sirens to sound across central Israel.

== See also ==
- 20 July 2024 Israeli attack on Yemen
- 29 September 2024 Israeli attacks on Yemen
- US–UK airstrikes on Yemen – missile strikes by the United States and the United Kingdom on Houthi controlled parts of Yemen
- Operation Wooden Leg – the most distant publicly known airstrike undertaken by the Israel Defense Forces
- Operation Opera – another long-distance airstrike undertaken by the IDF
