= Timeline of the Gaza war (20 August 2025 – 2 October 2025) =

- Initial attacks; (7–27 October 2023); Invasion of the Gaza Strip; (28 October 2023 – 23 November 2023); First ceasefire; (24 November 2023 – 11 January 2024); Yemen airstrikes; (12 January 2024 – 6 May 2024); Rafah offensive; (7 May 2024 – 12 July 2024); Al-Mawasi attack; (13 July 2024 – 26 September 2024); Attack on Hezbollah headquarters; (27 September 2024 – 16 October 2024); Killing of Yahya Sinwar; (17 October 2024 – 26 November 2024); Israel–Lebanon ceasefire agreement; (27 November 2024 – 18 January 2025); Israel–Hamas ceasefire agreement; (19 January 2025 – 17 March 2025); March 2025 Israeli attacks on the Gaza Strip; (18 March 2025 – 15 May 2025); May 2025 Gaza offensive; (16 May 2025 – 19 August 2025); August 2025 Gaza offensive; (20 August 2025 – 2 October 2025); October 2025 Israel–Hamas ceasefire agreement; (3 October 2025 – present)

== August ==
=== 20 August ===
- The Gaza Health Ministry said that at least 58 people were killed throughout Gaza in the past 24 hours, increasing its count of the Palestinian death toll in Gaza to 62,122. (Note: Casualty count includes both militants and civilians.)
- The IDF announced a mobilization of 60,000 reserve troops for its plans to take over Gaza City, and later began its operation.
- The IDF announced that in the prior week in Khan Yunis it killed a Nukhba forces militant who participated in the 7 October attacks.
- The IDF ordered the evacuation of Jabalia and the outskirts of Gaza City.
- The IDF said that 18 Hamas militants infiltrated an IDF post in Khan Yunis, opened fire using machine-guns and RPG's, injuring three soldiers one critically and one slightly. It also said that ten Hamas militants were killed, and eight others managed to return to the tunnel shaft from which they initiated the attack.
- The Trump administration sanctioned more ICC judges, prosecutors, saying that they directly engaged in efforts to investigate, arrest, detain, or prosecute nationals of the United States or Israel, without the consent of either nation.
- The IDF struck Hezbollah facilities in south Lebanon including a rocket launcher and weapons storage facilities, saying it removed threats on Israel that violated the agreement with Lebanon.
- The IDF said that the Givati Brigade resumed operations to destroy militant infrastructure both above and below ground, to kill militants, and to strengthen their hold to prevent militants from returning to their positions in Jabalia and Gaza City.
- The IDF announced that 99th division uncovered a tunnel with weaponry belonging to Hamas in Zaytun in recent days.

=== 21 August ===
- The Gaza Health Ministry said that at least 70 people were killed throughout Gaza in the past 24 hours, increasing its count of the Palestinian death toll in Gaza to 62,192. The IDF reported that more than 22,000 of those killed were militants.
- The Gaza Health Ministry said that two people died due to malnutrition in Gaza in the last 24 hours, increasing its count of the death toll due to malnutrition since the start of the war to 271.
- Wafa reported that a former Palestinian national basketball player was shot dead near a GHF aid distribution point while seeking aid and medicine for his daughter.
- The Lebanese Health Ministry said that an Israeli strike hit a motorcycle in Nabatieh Governorate, killing a man.
- The IDF said that a Palestinian militant opened fire towards Israelis in the vicinity of Adei Ad, slightly injuring one man.
- The IDF said that a militant group tried to disrupt aid delivery in Gaza and launched a rocket from a position near Nasser Hospital. It also said that the rocket fell next to an aid convoy that came from Israel's Kerem Shalom border crossing.
- The IDF said that it struck the Hamas launch site in Khan Yunis that was used by militants for shelling the IDF during an attack that critically injured one soldier and lightly injured two others in the prior day.

=== 22 August ===
- The Gaza Health Ministry said that at least 71 people were killed throughout Gaza in the past 24 hours, increasing its count of the Palestinian death toll in Gaza to 62,263.
- The Integrated Food Security Phase Classification said that Gaza City is gripped by famine and it is likely to spread across Gaza. In response, the Netanyahu government denied it.
- Shafaq reported that at least twelve people were killed after an Israeli strike hit a school in Sheikh Radwan.
- The IDF said that it downed a drone that was launched from Yemen and reached Israel.
- The IDF said that it killed a Hezbollah operative in Ayta ash-Shaab and accused him of trying to rehabilitate Hezbollah infrastructure.
- The IDF said that a missile fired from Yemen "most likely fragmented in mid-air" due to its attempts to down it. An IAF investigation found that the missile had a cluster bomb warhead.
- The IDF said that it struck a facility used by Hezbollah to store weapons in Deir Kifa.
- The IDF said that its 36th division struck buildings that hosted Hamas militants in Khan Yunis, as well as a launch site in Deir el-Balah which had rockets aimed at Israel.
- The IDF said that its 99th division operated in the outskirts of Gaza City to destroy militant infrastructure both above and below ground, killed militants, struck a building that was used for militant activity, and destroyed a weapons warehouse in Zeitoun.
- The IDF said that its 215th division killed militants and destroyed a building used by militants.

=== 23 August ===
- The Gaza Health Ministry said that at least 61 bodies of people killed in Israeli attacks arrived at hospitals throughout Gaza in the past 24 hours, increasing its count of the Palestinian death toll in Gaza to 62,622.
- The Gaza Health Ministry said that eight people, including two children died due to malnutrition in Gaza in the last 24 hours, increasing its count of the death toll due to malnutrition since the start of the war to 281, including 114 children.
- The IDF said that a platoon commander from the Kfir Brigade's Shimshon Battalion was killed in an operational accident involving an IDF explosive device detonation in Khan Yunis.

=== 24 August ===
- The Gaza Health Ministry said that at least 64 bodies of people killed in Israeli attacks arrived at hospitals throughout Gaza in the past 24 hours, increasing its count of the Palestinian death toll in Gaza to 62,686.
- The Gaza Health Ministry said that eight people died due to malnutrition in Gaza in the last 24 hours, increasing its count of the death toll due to malnutrition since the start of the war to 289.
- The IDF said that it struck a military site where the presidential palace is situated, power plants, a site used to store fuel in Sanaa and accused Houthi militants of using civilian infrastructure for militant purposes. The Houthi-run Health Ministry said that six people were killed and 86 others were wounded in the strikes.
- An Israeli policeman who had participated in the fighting at the Sderot police station during the 7 October attacks committed suicide.

=== 25 August ===
- The Gaza Health Ministry said that at least 58 bodies of people killed in Israeli attacks arrived at hospitals throughout Gaza in the past 24 hours, increasing its count of the Palestinian death toll in Gaza to 62,744.
- The Gaza Health Ministry said that 11 people, including two children died due to malnutrition in Gaza in the last 24 hours, increasing its count of the death toll due to malnutrition since the start of the war to 300.
- An Israeli double tap strike hit the Nasser Hospital, killing according to health officials and news organizations at least 22 people, including medics and five journalists. Most of the deaths were caused by the second strike. The IDF said that it targeted a Hamas surveillance camera and six of those killed were militants. Hamas denied it. A Reuters probe found that the camera actually belonged to the news agency.
- The Lebanese Health Ministry said that an Israeli drone attack hit Tibnin, killing one person.

=== 26 August ===
- The Gaza Health Ministry said that at least 75 bodies of people killed in Israeli attacks arrived at hospitals throughout Gaza in the past 24 hours, increasing its count of the Palestinian death toll in Gaza to 62,819.
- The Gaza Health Ministry said that three people died due to malnutrition in Gaza in the last 24 hours, increasing its count for the number of deaths due to malnutrition since the start of the war to 303.

=== 27 August ===
- The Gaza Health Ministry said that at least 76 bodies of people killed in Israeli attacks arrived at hospitals throughout Gaza in the past 24 hours, increasing its count of the Palestinian death toll in Gaza to 62,895.
- The Gaza Health Ministry said that Israeli strikes throughout Gaza killed at least 20 people, including a four-year-old girl.
- The IDF announced that it killed Hamas's general security intelligence head in western Gaza in a strike the previous week.
- The Gaza Health Ministry said that 10 people died due to malnutrition, increasing death toll due to malnutrition since the start of the war to 313.
- The IDF said that it downed a missile launched towards Israel by the Houthis.

=== 28 August ===
- The Gaza Health Ministry said that at least 71 bodies of people killed in Israeli attacks arrived at hospitals throughout Gaza in the past 24 hours, increasing its count of the Palestinian death toll in Gaza to 62,966.
- The IDF said that the IAF downed a drone fired from Yemen prior to entering into Israel.
- The IDF said that it struck multiple Hezbollah militant infrastructures, including a rocket launcher in south Lebanon and accused the group of violating the ceasefire. NNA reported that the strike in Qila injured one person.
- The IDF said that it struck a military target that belong to the Houthis in Sanaa. On 30 August, the Houthis confirmed that prime minister Ahmed al-Rahawi and several of his ministers were killed in the strike.
- The Lebanese Army said that two soldiers were killed and two injured in an explosion when they searched a crashed Israeli drone in Ras al-Naqoura. The IDF expressed regret.

=== 29 August ===
- The Gaza Health Ministry said that at least 59 bodies of people arrived at hospitals throughout Gaza in the past 24 hours, increasing its count of the Palestinian death toll in Gaza to 63,025.
- The Gaza Health Ministry said that five people including two children died due to malnutrition, increasing its count of the death toll due to malnutrition since the start of the war to 322.
- The daily 10 hours Humanitarian pause was ended by Israeli forces in Gaza City saying it constitutes a dangerous combat zone.
- The IDF and Shin Bet recovered the bodies of hostages Ilan Weiss and Idan Shtivi from Gaza.
- An Israeli strike in Gaza killed several people, including a three-year-old child, according to a relative of them.
- The Trump administration announced that it would bar entry of Palestinian officials seeking to attend the U.N. General Assembly in New York City in September saying the PA and PLO are "undermining the prospects for peace” and should "consistently repudiate terrorism, and end incitement to terrorism in education, as required by U.S. law and as promised by the PLO".

=== 30 August ===
- The Gaza Health Ministry said that at least 66 bodies of people killed in Israeli attacks arrived at hospitals throughout Gaza in the past 24 hours, increasing its count of the Palestinian death toll in Gaza to 63,371.
- An Israeli strike hit in the vicinity of a bakery in Gaza City, killing 12 people.
- The IDF announced that a soldier was moderately injured and several other soldiers were slightly injured when a personnel carrier hit an explosive device in Zeitoun neighborhood of Gaza City.
- An Israeli strike hit an apartment in Rimal neighborhood of Gaza City killing 11 people, including children. Israeli officials said that it targeted al-Qassam Brigades spokesperson Abu Obaida.
- The IDF announced that a reservist from its 36th Division was killed in a friendly fire incident in south Gaza, becoming the 900th soldier killed since the war began on 7 October and increasing the IDF death toll to 461.
- Hamas confirmed the death of its leader in the Gaza Strip, Mohammed Sinwar.

=== 31 August ===
- The Gaza Health Ministry said that at least 88 bodies of people killed in Israeli attacks arrived at hospitals throughout Gaza in the past 24 hours, increasing its count of the Palestinian death toll in Gaza to 63,459.
- The Gaza Health Ministry said that seven people died due to malnutrition, increasing its count of the death toll due to malnutrition since the start of the war to 339.
- The IDF said that it attacked "underground Hezbollah infrastructure" in Beaufort Ridge and accused the group of violating the ceasefire.
- Israeli Defence Minister Israel Katz said that al-Qassam Brigades spokesperson Abu Obaida was killed by Israeli forces in Gaza.
- A missile fired from Yemen fell prior to reaching Israel.

== September ==
=== 1 September ===
- The Gaza Health Ministry said that at least 98 bodies of people killed in Israeli attacks arrived at hospitals throughout Gaza in the past 24 hours, increasing its count of the Palestinian death toll in Gaza to 63,557.
- Palestinian officials and witnesses said that Israeli strikes hit homes in Gaza City, killing at least 19 people including children and women.
- The Gaza Health Ministry said that nine people, including three children died due to malnutrition in the last day, increasing its count of the death toll from malnutrition since the start of the war to 348.
- The IDF said that a UAV launched at Israel from Yemen was downed before reaching its target.
- The IDF said that its Unit 990 attacked surveillance posts and a building used by militants that was used for launching 2 rockets at its forces.
- The IDF said that its Givati Brigade killed militants in Jabalia and destroyed underground pathways and explosives fields.
- The IDF said that its Golani Brigade and Unit 188 killed two militants and destroyed underground militant infrastructures.
- The IDF said that its "Diamond Unit" destroyed 8km of underground pathways.

=== 2 September ===
- The Gaza Health Ministry said that at least 76 bodies of people killed in Israeli attacks arrived at hospitals throughout Gaza in the past 24 hours, increasing its count of the Palestinian death toll in Gaza to 63,633.
- The Gaza Health Ministry said that thirteen people, including three children died due to malnutrition in the last day, increasing its count of the death toll from malnutrition since the start of the war to 361.
- Two missiles fired from Yemen at Israel fell on their way in Saudi Arabia.
- The IDF said that it killed dozens of Hamas militants in north and central Gaza, including the Zaytoun Battalion's deputy company commander since 2024. It added that it killed a Nukhba forces commander who participated in the 7 October attacks and destroyed militant structures in Shuja'iyya and Zaytun.
- The IDF said that it downed a missile fired from Yemen prior to entering Israel.
- The IDF and Shin Bet said that they killed a Hamas militant who held Israeli hostages Emily Damari, Romi Ronen and Naama Levy in Gaza.
- The IDF said that it downed two drones fired from Yemen.
- A militant that boasted killing 10 Israelis on a call to his family through a phone he took from a victim of his on the October 7 attacks, was killed in Deir al-Balah, according to local sources.

=== 3 September ===
- The Gaza Health Ministry said that at least 113 bodies of people killed in Israeli attacks arrived at hospitals throughout Gaza in the past 24 hours, increasing its count of the Palestinian death toll in Gaza to 63,746.
- The Gaza Health Ministry said that six people, including a child died due to malnutrition in the last day, increasing its count of the death toll from malnutrition since the start of the war to 367.
- The IDF and Shin Bet announced that they killed the head of the Mujahideen Brigades in the vicinity of Nuseirat, saying that the militant was appointed as head of the group after its previous three leaders were killed in IDF strikes in recent months.
- The IDF said that it downed two missiles fired towards Israel from Yemen, including one that carried cluster munitions.
- NNA reported that one person was killed in an Israeli drone attack in Yatar.
- The Lebanese Health Ministry said that Israeli artillery fire killed another person in south Lebanon.

=== 4 September ===
- The Gaza Health Ministry increased its count of the Palestinian death toll in Gaza to 64,231.
- The IDF announced that a missile fired from Yemen fell outside Israel.
- The IDF said that it downed two drones fired from Yemen.

=== 5 September ===
- The Gaza Health Ministry said that at least 69 bodies of people killed in Israeli attacks arrived at hospitals throughout Gaza in the past 24 hours, increasing its count of the Palestinian death toll in Gaza to 64,300.
- The Gaza Health Ministry said that three people died due to malnutrition in the last day, increasing its count of the death toll from malnutrition since the start of the war to 376.
- An Israeli missile strike destroyed Mushtaha Tower in Rimal, Gaza City. This came after the IDF announced that it would target tall buildings, saying that they were used by Hamas. Hamas denied it.
- A 57-year-old Palestinian man was killed by Israeli forces in the vicinity of an IDF checkpoint in Burin. The IDF said that it was approached by a militant who hurled a suspicious object and ignored commands to stop, prompting it to open fire under a “standard arrest procedure.”

=== 6 September ===
- The Gaza Health Ministry said that at least 68 bodies of people killed in Israeli attacks arrived at hospitals throughout Gaza in the past 24 hours, increasing its count of the Palestinian death toll in Gaza to 64,368.
- The Gaza Health Ministry said that six people, including a child died due to malnutrition in the last day, increasing its count of the death toll from malnutrition since the start of the war to 382.
- An Israeli missile strike destroyed Sousi Tower in Gaza City, saying that it was used for Hamas intelligence gathering and explosive devices. Hamas denied the accusation.

=== 7 September ===
- The Gaza Health Ministry said that at least 87 bodies of people killed in Israeli attacks arrived at hospitals throughout Gaza in the past 24 hours, increasing its count of the Palestinian death toll in Gaza to 64,455.
- The Gaza Health Ministry said that five people, including three children died due to malnutrition in the last day, increasing its count of the death toll from malnutrition since the start of the war to 387.
- A drone fired by the Houthis hit the Ramon Airport in Eilat, injuring two people.
- Al Jazeera reported that Israeli forces bombed Al-Farabi School in Gaza City, killing eight people.
- The IDF reported that Hamas fired two rockets from the Gaza strip towards the Israeli city of Netivot. One rocket was intercepted and the other fell in an open area.

=== 8 September ===
- The Gaza Health Ministry said that at least 67 bodies of people killed in Israeli attacks arrived at hospitals throughout Gaza in the past 24 hours, increasing its count of the Palestinian death toll in Gaza to 64,522.
- The Gaza Health Ministry said that six people, including two children died due to malnutrition in the last day, increasing its count of the death toll from malnutrition since the start of the war to 393.
- Two Palestinians shot and killed six Israelis and wounded several others. Those who carried out the attack were killed. al-Qassam Brigades claimed responsibility for the attack.
- Hezbollah officials said that Israeli strikes on northeastern Lebanon killed five people, including four Hezbollah militants.
- Four Israeli soldiers were killed in Kafr Jabalia following a Hamas assault on a tank, according to the IDF, increasing the number of Israeli soldiers killed in the Gaza invasion to 465. During subsequent exchanges of fire with the militants, a soldier was moderately injured, while two militants were also hit.

=== 9 September ===
- The Gaza Health Ministry said that at least 83 bodies of people killed in Israeli attacks arrived at hospitals throughout Gaza in the past 24 hours, increasing its count of the Palestinian death toll in Gaza to 64,605.
- The Gaza Health Ministry said that six people died due to malnutrition in the last day, increasing its count of the death toll from malnutrition since the start of the war to 399.
- The IAF carried out an airstrike on Hamas political leaders in Doha who met to formalize their response to US ideas for a hostage deal and a ceasefire in Gaza. Hamas said the targeted members survived, but six others were killed.
- A spokesperson for the Gaza-bound Global Sumud Flotilla said that an Israeli drone struck one of its vessels, the Portuguese-flagged "Family Boat", off Sidi Bou Said in Tunisia, causing a fire, but that all its passengers and crew were safe. The Tunisian National Guard denied the claim of a drone strike and said it was caused by those on board themselves.
- The IDF said that a militant that commanded a Hamas Nukhba group in Beit Hanoun, and took part in the 7 October attacks, and took parts in raids that killed and injured IDF soldiers, was killed by the IDF, while he was planning and about to execute additional attacks against IDF.

=== 10 September ===
- The Gaza Health Ministry said that at least 41 bodies of people killed in Israeli attacks arrived at hospitals throughout Gaza in the past 24 hours, increasing its count of the Palestinian death toll in Gaza to 64,656.
- The Gaza Health Ministry said that five people, including a child, died due to malnutrition in the last day, increasing its count of the death toll from malnutrition since the start of the war to 404.
- The IDF said that it carried out strikes on Houthi targets including military camps where the group's militants were present, a fuel storage facility, and the Military Public Relations Headquarters in Sanaa and Al Jawf Governorate. The Houthi Health Ministry said that at least 35 people were killed and 131 others were injured.
- The Global Sumud Flotilla said that another drone struck one of its vessels while it was docked at Sidi Bou Said in Tunisia, the British-flagged "Alma", setting it on fire.

=== 11 September ===
- The Gaza Health Ministry said that at least 72 bodies of people killed in Israeli attacks arrived at hospitals throughout Gaza in the past 24 hours, increasing its count of the Palestinian death toll in Gaza to 64,718.
- The Gaza Health Ministry said that seven people, including a child, died due to malnutrition in the last day, increasing its count of the death toll from malnutrition since the start of the war to 411.
- The IDF said that it killed a militant from an Iranian division in Lebanon.
- The IDF said that it identified a suspected UAV over Eilat and southern Arava areas.
- The IDF said that its 36th division finished its mission in Khan Yunis, during which hundreds of militants were killed, dozens of underground tunnels including Hamas hideouts and hundreds of militant infrastructures were destroyed.

=== 12 September ===
- The Gaza Health Ministry said that at least 38 bodies of people killed in Israeli attacks arrived at hospitals throughout Gaza in the past 24 hours, increasing its count of the Palestinian death toll in Gaza to 64,756.
- The Gaza Health Ministry said that two people, including a child, died due to malnutrition in the last day, increasing its count of the death toll from malnutrition since the start of the war to 413.
- Gaza's civil defence agency reported that an Israeli strike hit northwestern Gaza City, killing 14 people including, according to a relative, women and children.

=== 13 September ===
- The Gaza Health Ministry said that at least 47 bodies of people killed in Israeli attacks arrived at hospitals throughout Gaza in the past 24 hours, increasing its count of the Palestinian death toll in Gaza to 64,803.
- The Gaza Health Ministry said that seven people, including two children, died due to malnutrition in the last day, increasing its count of the death toll from malnutrition since the start of the war to 420.
- The IDF reported that a missile launched at Israel by the Houthis was downed without causing any casualties.

=== 14 September ===
- The Gaza Health Ministry said that at least 68 bodies of people killed in Israeli attacks arrived at hospitals throughout Gaza in the past 24 hours, increasing its count of the Palestinian death toll in Gaza to 64,871.
- The Gaza Health Ministry said that two people died due to malnutrition in the last day, increasing its count of the death toll from malnutrition since the start of the war to 422.

=== 15 September ===
- The Gaza Health Ministry said that at least 34 bodies of people killed in Israeli attacks arrived at hospitals throughout Gaza in the past 24 hours, increasing its count of the Palestinian death toll in Gaza to 64,905.
- The Gaza Health Ministry said that three people died due to malnutrition in the last day, increasing its count of the death toll from malnutrition since the start of the war to 425.

=== 16 September ===
- The Gaza Health Ministry said that at least 58 bodies of people killed in Israeli attacks arrived at hospitals throughout Gaza in the past 24 hours, increasing its count of the Palestinian death toll in Gaza to 64,964.
- The Gaza Health Ministry said that three people, including a child, died due to malnutrition in the last day, increasing its count of the death toll from malnutrition since the start of the war to 428.
- Israeli forces announced that they started the main phase of their Gaza City ground offensive.
- The IDF said that it carried out airstrikes on Houthi military infrastructure in Hodeida.

=== 17 September ===
- The Gaza Health Ministry said that at least 98 bodies of people killed in Israeli attacks arrived at hospitals throughout Gaza in the past 24 hours, increasing its count of the Palestinian death toll in Gaza to 65,062.
- The Gaza Health Ministry said that four people died due to malnutrition in the last day, increasing its count of the death toll from malnutrition since the start of the war to 432.

=== 18 September ===
- The Gaza Health Ministry reported that at least 79 bodies of people killed in Israeli attacks throughout Gaza in the past 24 hours, increasing its count of the Palestinian death toll in Gaza to 65,141.
- Four Israeli soldiers were killed by a roadside IED in Rafah, increasing the IDF death toll to 469.
- A drone fired by the Houthis hit a hotel in Eilat.
- Two IDF soldiers were killed by a Jordanian aid driver near Allenby Bridge at the West Bank–Jordan crossing. The shooter was killed at the scene.

=== 19 September ===
- The Gaza Health Ministry said that at least 33 bodies of people killed in Israeli attacks arrived at hospitals throughout Gaza in the past 24 hours, increasing its count of the Palestinian death toll in Gaza to 65,174.
- The Gaza Health Ministry said that four people, including one child died due to malnutrition in the last day, increasing its count of the death toll from malnutrition since the start of the war to 440.
- Hamas carried out public extrajudicial executions accusing those killed of being spies for Israel. The event was filmed and posted on social media.
- The Lebanese Health Ministry reported that a man was killed and 11 others were injured by an Israeli airstrike on a vehicle outside of Tibnin Public Hospital while another attack on a vehicle in Ansar killed one person. The IDF said that it killed a Hezbollah commander in south Lebanon. It added that it killed a Radwan force militant in Tibnin, and attacked "a vessel that was used by Hezbollah to gather intelligence" on Israeli forces in Naqura.

=== 20 September ===
- The Gaza Health Ministry said that at least 34 bodies of people killed in Israeli attacks arrived at hospitals throughout Gaza in the past 24 hours, increasing its count of the Palestinian death toll in Gaza to 65,208.
- The Gaza Health Ministry said that two people died due to malnutrition in the last day, increasing its count of the death toll from malnutrition since the start of the war to 442.
- Al Jazeera reported that at least four children were killed after an Israeli strike hit a school sheltering displaced Palestinians in Gaza City.
- The IDF said that it killed a Hamas sniper in Gaza City who was en route to attack its soldiers.

=== 21 September ===
- The Gaza Health Ministry said that at least 75 bodies of people killed in Israeli attacks arrived at hospitals throughout Gaza in the past 24 hours, increasing its count of the Palestinian death toll in Gaza to 65,283.
- Al Jazeera reported that an Israeli strike hit the Sabra neighborhood of Gaza City, killing at least 25 people who were all members of the same family. Seventeen others were rescued in the aftermath of the attacks.
- Al Jazeera reported that an Israeli strike hit Bureij, killing seven Palestinians, including four children.
- Lebanon's health ministry said that an Israeli strike hit a motorbike and a vehicle in Bint Jbeil, killing five people including three children and injuring two others. The IDF said that one of those killed was a Hezbollah militant and it regrets any harm to uninvolved individuals.
- The IDF said that two missiles were launched from Gaza to Israel. It also said that one was intercepted by the IAF and the other fell in an open area.

=== 22 September ===
- The Gaza Health Ministry said that at least 61 people were killed in Israeli attacks throughout Gaza in the past 24 hours, increasing its count of the Palestinian death toll in Gaza to 65,344.
- The IDF said that it killed the militants who attacked and injured an officer of the Givati Brigade in Gaza City.
- An Israeli soldier from the 7th Armored Brigade was killed during combat in Gaza City after a Hamas militant fired a RPG at the brigade's tanks.

=== 23 September ===
- The Gaza Health Ministry said that at least 38 people were killed in Israeli attacks throughout Gaza in the past 24 hours, increasing its count of the Palestinian death toll in Gaza to 65,382.
- The IDF said its airstrike killed a group of militants that planted explosive devices in Gaza City.
- Israeli media outlet Channel 12 reported that Hamas militants executed 3 Palestinians in Gaza City for alleged collaboration with Israel.
- Al Jazeera reported that one man was killed and others were wounded during an Israeli strike in Tel al-Hawa.
- Al Jazeera reported that Israeli shelling destroyed the main medical centre in Gaza City, injuring at least two medical workers.

=== 24 September ===
- The Gaza Health Ministry said that at least 37 people were killed in Israeli attacks throughout Gaza in the past 24 hours, increasing its count of the Palestinian death toll in Gaza to 65,419.
- Organisers of the Gaza-aid Global Sumud Flotilla reported hearing explosions and seeing multiple drone attacks from their boats situated off Greece near the coast of Crete.
- Magen David Adom reported that at least 24 Israelis were injured, including two critically, from a Houthi drone that hit Eilat.
- The IDF said that its Nahal Brigade struck militant infrastructure in Gaza City, killed a militant in a shootout, seized weapons, and destroyed a structure from which a rocket was launched.
- A soldier from the Nahal Brigade was killed by Hamas sniper fire in Gaza City, increasing the IDF death toll in Gaza to 471.

=== 25 September ===
- The Gaza Health Ministry said that at least 83 people were killed in Israeli attacks throughout Gaza in the past 24 hours, increasing its count of the Palestinian death toll in Gaza to 65,502.
- The IDF said that it carried out airstrikes on Houthi targets in Sanaa. The Houthi health ministry said that at least nine people were killed in the attacks.

=== 26 September ===
- The Gaza Health Ministry said that at least 47 people were killed in Israeli attacks throughout Gaza in the past 24 hours, increasing its count of the Palestinian death toll in Gaza to 65,549.

=== 27 September ===
- The Gaza Health Ministry said that at least 77 people were killed in Israeli attacks throughout Gaza in the past 24 hours, increasing its count of the Palestinian death toll in Gaza to 65,926.

=== 28 September ===
- The Gaza Health Ministry said that at least 79 people were killed and brought to hospitals throughout Gaza in the past 24 hours, increasing its count of the Palestinian death toll in Gaza to 66,005.
- The IDF said that one of its soldiers was killed in a friendly-fire incident by a fellow soldier after a militant attempted to attack both of them at a junction near Kedumim in the West Bank.
- The IDF said that a Hamas militant of the Bureij Battalion, who participated in the 7 October attacks and took part of abducting Israelis during the attack, and since then participated and directed several attacks on the IDF in Gaza, was killed.
- The IDF said it destroyed several Hezbollah weapon repositories that violated the ceasefire agreement.

=== 29 September ===
- The Gaza Health Ministry said that at least 50 people were killed in Israeli attacks throughout Gaza in the past 24 hours, increasing its count of the Palestinian death toll in Gaza to 66,055.
- The IDF said that two militants were killed after they attacked a guarded area in Gaza City.
- The IDF announced that in the prior week it killed a militant who participated in the 7 October attacks, led launches of incendiary balloons at Israel in the years prior to the war, was in charge of the parading of Israeli hostages in Gaza City when they were released, and took part in various attacks on Israeli forces.

=== 30 September ===
- The Gaza Health Ministry said that at least 42 people were killed in Israeli attacks throughout Gaza in the past 24 hours, increasing its count of the Palestinian death toll in Gaza to 66,097.
- The Gaza Health Ministry increased its count of the death toll from malnutrition since the start of the war to 453.
- The IDF said that in the Zeytun suburb of Gaza City a concealed explosive field that was intended to strike soldiers of the IDF, was destroyed by Unit 11 of the IDF.
- The IDF said that in the Gaza, a militant armed with weapon and grenades who approached soldiers of Givati was killed.
- The IDF said that it killed two Hezbollah militants that were in charge of artillery in southern Lebanon, used rockets to attack Israel, and accused them of working on rebuilding militant infrastructure and attacks against its forces.

== October ==
=== 1 October ===
- The Gaza Health Ministry said that at least 51 people were killed in Israeli attacks throughout Gaza in the past 24 hours, increasing its count of the Palestinian death toll in Gaza to 66,148.
- The Gaza Health Ministry said that two people, including a child, died due to malnutrition in the last day, increasing its count of the death toll from malnutrition since the start of the war to 455.
- The IDF said that its 99th division obtained "operational hold" of the Netzarim Corridor.
- The IDF said that the IAF downed two rockets launched from north Gaza towards Israel.
- The IDF boarded and seized several ships that took part in the Global Sumud Flotilla.

=== 2 October ===
- The Gaza Health Ministry said that at least 77 people were killed in Israeli attacks throughout Gaza in the past 24 hours, increasing its count of the Palestinian death toll in Gaza to 66,225.
- The IDF said that a militant climbed to an IDF post in central Gaza, and opened fire. It added that an officer from the border protection corps was severely injured and two other soldiers were lightly injured.
