= US–UK airstrikes on Yemen =

Military strikes conducted by the US and UK against Yemeni Houthis

- Part of the Operation Prosperity Guardian, Red Sea crisis and the Yemeni civil war
- Location of airstrikes in Houthi-controlled territory (green) in Yemen on 12 January 2024
Date	First phase: 12 January 2024 – 17 January 2025 (1 year and 5 days); Second phase: 15 March 2025 – 6 May 2025 (1 month and 3 weeks)
Location	Houthi-held Yemen (shown in green in the map above)
Result	Inconclusive: 2025 U.S.–Houthi ceasefire; Houthis ceased attacks on the commercial shipping in the Red Sea; Houthis to continue targeting Israel and Israeli-linked vessels

Belligerents
United States; United Kingdom	Houthi Yemen; Houthis

Commanders and leaders
(United States) Donald Trump; (United States) Pete Hegseth; (United States) Joe Biden; (United States) Lloyd Austin; (United States) Brad Cooper; (United States) George Wikoff; (United Kingdom) Keir Starmer; (United Kingdom) John Healey; (United Kingdom) Rishi Sunak; (United Kingdom) Grant Shapps	(Houthis) Abdul-Malik al-Houthi; (Houthis) Mohamed al-Atifi; (Houthis) Mahdi al-Mashat; (Houthis) Abdel-Aziz bin Habtour; (Houthis) Yahya Saree

Units involved
United States Air Force; United States Navy; Royal Air Force	Yemeni Armed Forces (SPC-faction); Yemeni Navy

Strength
United States Navy; USS Dwight D. Eisenhower; F/A-18 Super Hornets; USS Philippine Sea; USS Gravely; USS Mason; USS Carney; USS Florida; Royal Air Force; Typhoon FGR.4s	Unknown

Casualties and losses
15 MQ-9 Reapers shot down	600 Houthis killed (up to 22 April)

Between 12 January 2024 and 6 May 2025 the United States and the United Kingdom, with support from Australia, Bahrain, Canada, Denmark, the Netherlands, and New Zealand, launched a series of cruise missile and airstrikes against the Houthi movement in Yemen in response to Houthi attacks on ships in the Red Sea. The Houthis had previously declared that their attacks were in support of Palestinians during the Gaza war; Houthi attacks on shipping were condemned by the United Nations Security Council the day before the initial strike.

The first phase of attacks between January 2024 and January 2025 were codenamed Operation Poseidon Archer. US President Joe Biden ordered the strikes, and UK Prime Minister Rishi Sunak convened his cabinet to authorize British participation. American officials said the strikes were intended to degrade Houthi capabilities to attack Red Sea targets rather than to kill leaders and Iranian trainers. By 2 January 2025, the Houthis recorded 931 American and British airstrikes against its sites in Yemen, resulting in 106 deaths and 314 injuries. The strikes were halted during much of the January 2025 Gaza war ceasefire, which lasted from January to March.

Airstrikes resumed between 15 March and 6 May 2025, under the codename Operation Rough Rider. US President Donald Trump ordered the operation with over 1,000 airstrikes having been conducted by the end of April, with UK Prime Minister Keir Starmer authorizing strikes as well. On 6 May, Trump declared the strikes to be over as a result of a ceasefire reached between the United States and the Houthis, brokered by Oman.

== Background ==
Houthi attacks on commercial ships in the Bab-el-Mandeb strait.

On 16 February 2021, the Biden administration removed the Houthis, the formal political and military organization of the Houthi movement, from the Foreign Terrorist Organization (FTO) blacklist, due to concerns that the designation would impede the delivery of humanitarian aid amid Yemen's worsening political and socioeconomic crisis, as the Houthis controlled much of the most populated territory in Yemen. In April 2022, the United Nations brokered a ceasefire between the Houthis and Yemen's internationally recognized Presidential Leadership Council (PLC), which, despite formally lapsing the following October, continues to hold as of December 2023.

With the start of the Gaza war in October 2023, the Iran-backed, (Note: Both Iran and the Houthi movement deny that Iran is involved or is backing the Houthis.) Houthi-controlled Supreme Political Council declared its support for Hamas and began launching attacks on commercial ships transiting the Red Sea, especially in the Bab el-Mandeb, the narrow strait that connects the Red Sea to the Gulf of Aden. While the Houthis initially claimed to target only commercial ships bound for Israeli ports or with some link to Israel, they soon began indiscriminately targeting vessels, attempting attacks on ships with no discernible Israeli ties. Israeli National Security Advisor Tzachi Hanegbi warned that "Israel is giving the world some time to organize in order to prevent this but if there isn't to be a global arrangement, because it is a global issue, we will act in order to remove this naval siege." To launch attacks on Red Sea shipping, the Houthis use coastal missile batteries, loitering munitions, and fast attack craft armed with light autocannons, machine guns, and anti-tank missiles.

By 21 December 2023, the Port of Eilat, which gives Israel via the Red Sea its only easy shipping access to Asia without the need to transit the Suez Canal, had seen an 85% drop in activity due to the Houthi action.

Before the Houthi attack on the freighter Maersk Hangzhou on 30 December 2023, the United States had shot down a total of 24 Houthi missiles and drones and deployed naval ships to protect Red Sea shipping lanes, but had not engaged directly with the Houthis.

A considerable number of freighters have continued to transit, with mostly large container ships diverting away rather than other shipping, with the strait continuing to be heavily used by bulk carriers and tankers which are under different contract arrangements and often from countries supportive of Gaza's situation so perceiving a minimal risk from ongoing Houthi attacks. In the first week of January 2024 the average number of freighters active each day in the Red Sea included 105 bulk carriers and 58 tankers, down from 115 bulk carriers and 70 tankers the week before. In contrast, six of the ten largest container shipping companies were largely avoiding the Red Sea, with relatively few container ships transiting the Bab al-Mandeb strait from 18 December 2023.

As of January 2024, most marine insurances require a warranty of no Israeli involvement to insure vessels for the Red Sea route, with some requiring warranties of no US or UK interest and no calls to Israeli ports in the last 12 months.

On 3 January 2024, the United States and a group of countries issued an ultimatum to the Houthis to stop their activities. In the days leading up to the strike, members of the US Congress and The Pentagon demanded a strong and deterrent response to the Houthis. One day before the strike, the United Nations Security Council passed a resolution condemning Houthi activities in the Red Sea, in which Russia, China, Algeria and Mozambique abstained.

== Timeline ==
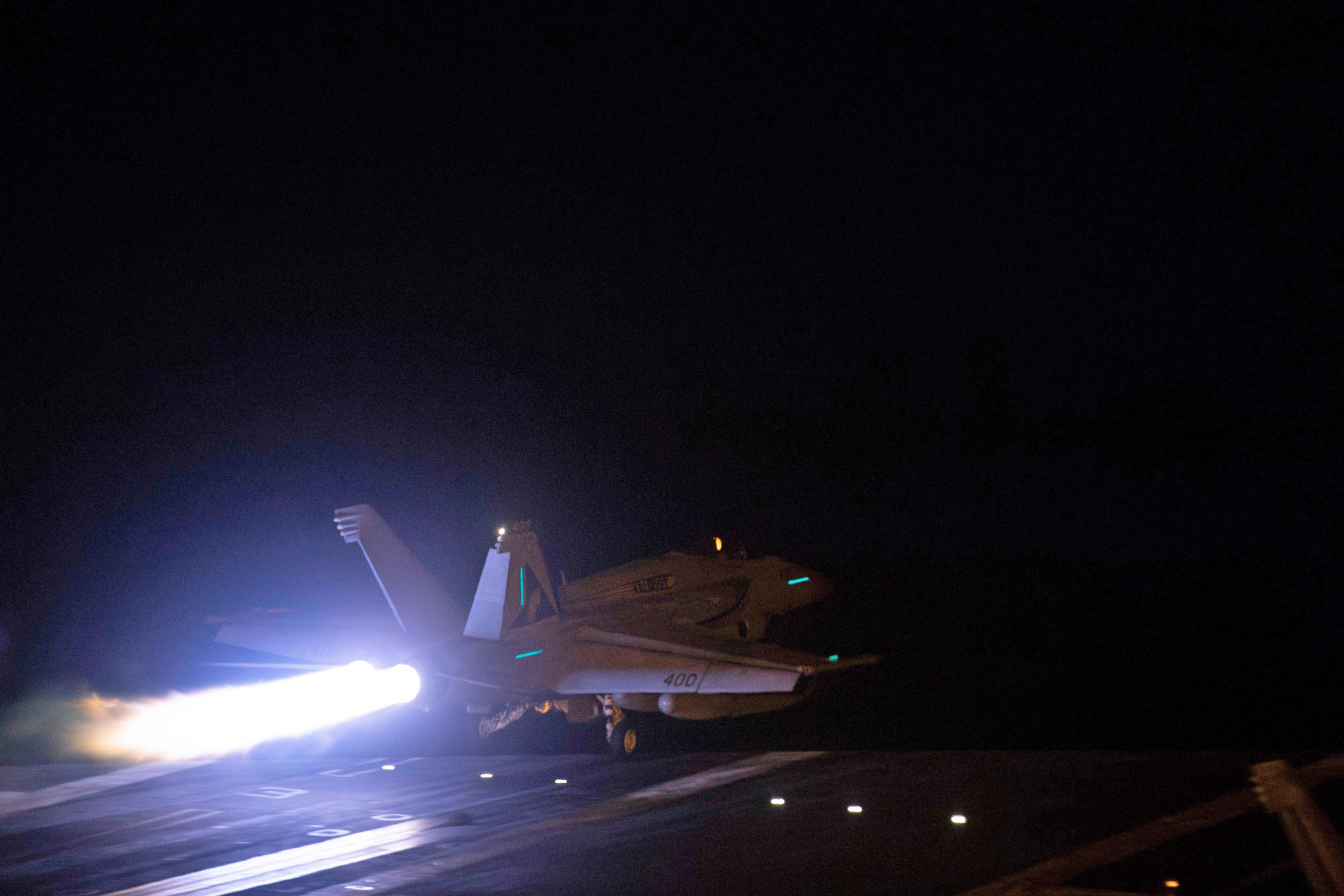
A US Navy F/A-18 taking off prior to the strikes

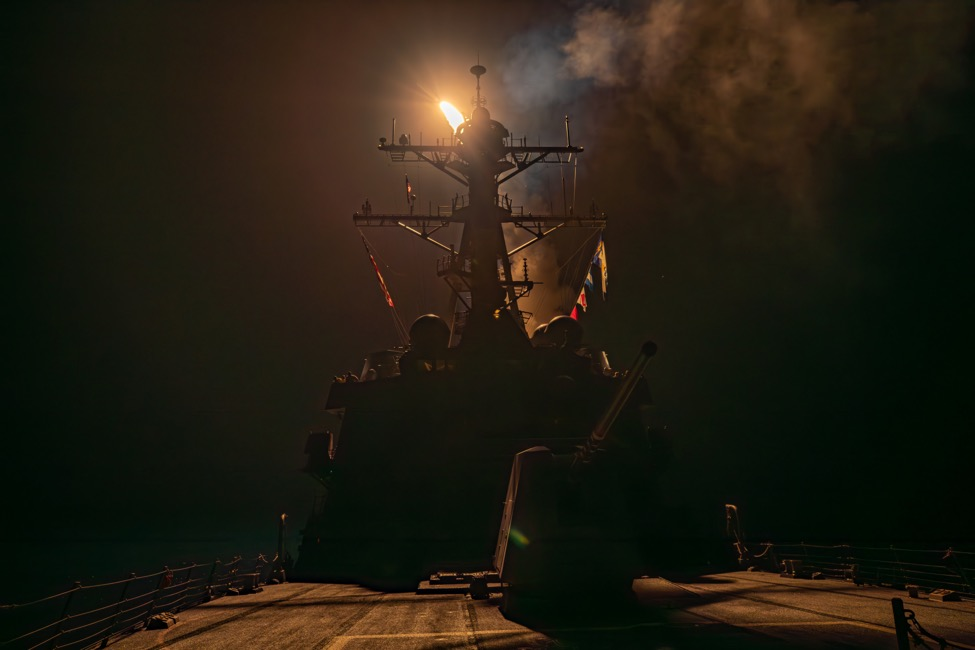
Tomahawk missiles being launched from a US destroyer

=== January 2024 ===
On 12 January, the first wave of strikes began around 2:30 a.m. Yemen time (UTC+3). American fighter jets, armed with precision-guided bombs, were dispatched from regional bases. Simultaneously, 22 fixed-wing aircraft, including F/A-18s, took off from the aircraft carrier USS Dwight D. Eisenhower. In addition, the cruiser USS Philippine Sea, the destroyers USS Gravely, and USS Mason, along with the cruise-missile submarine USS Florida, launched a total of 80 Tomahawk cruise missiles. During this first wave of strikes, more than 100 missiles hit more than 60 targets in 16 locations. About 30 to 60 minutes later, a second wave of more than 50 missiles struck dozens more targets in 12 other locations.

The BBC reported four Royal Air Force Typhoon jets flew from the RAF Akrotiri airbase in Cyprus in the strike. Two Royal Air Force Voyager air-to-air refueling tankers supported the mission. The Ministry of Defence announced that it had targeted two sites. One, at Bani in northwestern Yemen, had been used to launch reconnaissance and attack drones. The other was Abs Airport, which, according to the MoD, had been used to launch cruise missiles and drones at targets in the Red Sea. Explosions were reported in Sanaa, Hodeidah, and Dhamar. The targets included logistics centres, air defense systems, and weapons storage sites. According to Al-Masirah, a Houthi-run news channel, the strikes hit Hodeida International Airport, Taiz International Airport, al-Dailami Air Base (which shares the runway with Sanaa International Airport), an airport near Hajjah, and a camp east of Saada. This set of airstrikes began Operation Poseidon Archer.

On 13 January, At 3:45 a.m. Yemen time (UTC+3) the US struck a radar site near Sanaa, which Al-Masirah reported was at Al-Dailami Air Base. US Central Command said the "follow-on action" was conducted by the destroyer USS Carney with Tomahawk missiles. On 16 January, at 4:15 a.m local time, the US conducted new airstrikes in Yemen, targeting four Houthi anti-ship ballistic missiles that US officials said were being prepared to target ships in the region.

On 17 January, at about 11:59 p.m. local time, US ships and submarines fired missiles against 14 Houthi missiles that US officials said were an immediate threat to ships in the region.

On 18 January, at 3:40 p.m. local time, the US struck three Houthi anti-ship missiles that US officials said were being prepared to target commercial ships in the region.

On 19 January, at 6:45 p.m. local time, US Navy F/A-18 aircraft from the USS Dwight D. Eisenhower targeted Houthi anti-ship missiles in Yemen that US officials said were being prepared for launch. Al-Masirah reported airstrikes in the al-Jabaana neighborhood of Hodeida.

On 20 January, at 4 a.m. local time, a US airstrikes hit a Houthi anti-ship missile that US officials said was prepared to target shipping in the Gulf of Aden.

On 22 January, at about 11:59 p.m. local time, the US and UK conducted joint air and missile strikes against on eight Houthi targets across Yemen, including radars and drone and missile sites. Al-Masirah reported airstrikes in Sanaa and al-Dailami Air Base.

On 27 January, at about 3:45 a.m. local time, US forces hit a Houthi anti-ship missile that US officials said was being prepared for use against ships in the Red Sea.

On 31 January, at about 3:30 p.m. local time, the US conducted a strike against a Houthi surface-to-air missile that US officials said posed an imminent threat to US aircraft.

=== February 2024 ===
On 1 February, at about 1:30 a.m. local time, the US conducted strikes against a Houthi UAV ground control station and 10 Houthi one-way UAVs.

On 3 February, at about 7:20 p.m. local time, the US struck six anti-ship cruise missiles that US officials said were an "imminent threat" as they were being prepared to launch against vessels in the Red Sea.

Later that day, at about 11:30 p.m. local time, the US and UK struck 36 Houthi targets at 13 locations: underground storage facilities, command and control centers, missile systems, UAV storage and operational sites, radars, and helicopters. The sites were struck using F/A-18 fighter jets from the USS Dwight D Eisenhower and Tomahawk missiles fired by the USS Gravely and the USS Carney from the Red Sea. Explosions were reported in Sanaa following the strikes. Sky News Arabia reported that over 40 Houthi fighters were killed in the airstrikes conducted that day.

On 4 February, at about 4 a.m. local time, the US struck an anti-ship cruise missile which was determined as an imminent threat. Additional strikes occurred at 5:30 a.m. and 10:30 a.m. local time, targeting five land attack cruise missiles that US officials said were being prepared for launch against merchant and US Navy ships.

On 7 February, at 9 p.m. local time, the US conducted strikes against two Houthi mobile anti-ship cruise missiles. A second strike against a Houthi mobile land attack cruise missile occurred at 11:30 p.m. as it prepared to target ships in the Red Sea. Houthi media reported that locations in Al Hudaydah Governorate were targeted.

On 8 February, the US conducted seven strikes against Houthi unmanned surface vessels and anti-ship cruise missiles that were prepared to launch against ships in the Red Sea.

On 9 February, the US conducted a total of seven strikes against Houthi unmanned surface vessels, mobile anti-ship cruise missiles, and a land attack cruise missile (LACM) that were prepared to launch against ships in the Red Sea. The Houthis said that 17 of its fighters were killed in the strikes.

On 10 February, at about 4-5 p.m. local time, the US conducted five strikes against Houthi unmanned surface vessels and mobile anti-ship cruise missiles north of Al Hudaydah.

On 13 February, the US conducted a strike on a Houthi mobile anti-ship cruise missile that was being prepared to target ships in the region.

On 14 February, the US conducted four strikes against seven anti-ship cruise missiles, three unmanned aerial vehicles, and one explosive unmanned surface vessel in Houthi controlled areas of Yemen.

On 15 February, the US conducted two strikes against Houthi anti-ship cruise missiles that were being prepared to target ships in the Red Sea.

On 16 February, the US conducted two strikes against Houthi anti-ship cruise missiles using unmanned surface vessels.

On 17 February, the United States military said it destroyed a Houthi unmanned underwater vehicle and a Houthi unmanned surface vehicle while also conducting three strikes against Houthi anti-ship cruise missiles.

On 20 February, a US MQ-9 Reaper drone was shot down by Houthi surface-to-air missiles near Hodeidah.

On 21 February, the US conducted four strikes targeting Houthi anti-ship ballistic and cruise missiles that were prepared to target shipping in the Red Sea.

On 22 February, the US conducted six strikes targeting Houthi unmanned aerial vehicles and anti-ship cruise missiles that were prepared to target shipping in the region.

On 23 February, the US conducted strikes against seven Houthi anti-ship cruise missiles that were prepared to target shipping in the region.

On 24 February, at around 11:45 p.m. local time, the US and UK carried out over a dozen airstrikes targeting 18 Houthi sites, marking their fourth round of joint airstrikes. According to US officials, the strikes aimed at underground weapons storage facilities, missile storage facilities, one-way attack unmanned aerial systems, air defense systems, radars, and a helicopter.

A day after the attacks, the Houthis' official news agency reported that a civilian was killed and eight others were injured.

On 26 February, between 4:45 p.m. and 11:45 p.m. local time, US strikes destroyed three UAVs and two anti-ship cruise missiles.

On 29 February, the US conducted two strikes targeting six Houthi anti-ship cruise missiles that were prepared to launch towards the Red Sea.

=== March 2024 ===
The US conducted a strike targeting a Houthi surface-to-air missile that was deemed as a threat to the US aircraft in the region.

On 4 March, the US conducted strikes targeting two Houthi anti-ship cruise missiles that presented a threat to merchant vessels and US Navy ships in the region.

On 6 March, the US conducted strikes against two unmanned aerial vehicles in a Houthi controlled area of Yemen that presented a threat to merchant vessels and US Navy ships in the region.

On 7 March, the US conducted strikes against four mobile Houthi anti-ship cruise missiles and one Houthi unmanned aerial vehicle in Houthi-controlled areas of Yemen.

On 8 March, the US conducted strikes against two Houthi truck-mounted anti-ship missiles in Houthi-controlled areas of Yemen.

On 11 March, the US conducted six strikes destroying an unmanned underwater vessel and 18 anti-ship missiles in Houthi controlled areas of Yemen.

On 13 March, the US conducted strikes against four unmanned aerial systems and one surface-to-air missile in Houthi-controlled areas of Yemen.

On 14 March, The US conducted strikes against nine anti-ship missiles and two unmanned aerial vehicles in Houthi-controlled areas of Yemen.

On 16 March, the US conducted strikes against five unmanned surface vessels and one UAV in Houthi-controlled areas of Yemen that posed a threat to shipping in the region.

On 18 March, the US conducted strikes against seven anti-ship missiles, three unmanned aerial vehicles, and three weapons storage containers in Houthi-controlled areas of Yemen.

On 22 March, the US conducted strikes against three Houthi underground storage facilities and four unmanned aerial vehicles in Houthi-controlled areas of Yemen, including in Sanaa.

On 30 March, the US conducted a strike on one unmanned aerial systems in the Houthi-controlled areas of Yemen.

=== April 2024 ===
On 4 April, the US conducted a strike on one anti-ship missile in a Houthi controlled territory of Yemen.

On 6 April, the US conducted strikes on one mobile surface-to air missile system in Houthi controlled territory of Yemen.

On 8 April, the US conducted strikes on an air defense system and a ground control station in Houthi-controlled areas of Yemen.

On 10 April, the US conducted strikes on eight UAVs in Houthi-controlled areas of Yemen.

On 14 April, the US conducted strikes on four UAVs in Houthi-controlled areas of Yemen.

On 16 April, the US conducted strikes on two UAVs in Houthi-controlled areas of Yemen.

On 25 April, the US conducted strikes on one unmanned surface vessel and one unmanned aerial vehicle in Houthi-controlled areas of Yemen.

On 30 April, The US conducted strikes on one uncrewed surface vessel in Houthi-controlled areas of Yemen.

=== May 2024 ===
On 2 May, the US conducted strikes on three uncrewed aerial systems (UAS) in Houthi-controlled areas of Yemen.

On 13 May, the US conducted strikes on one uncrewed aerial system (UAS) in Houthi-controlled areas of Yemen.

On 15 May, the US conducted strikes on four uncrewed aerial system (UAS) in Houthi-controlled areas of Yemen.

On 22 May, the US conducted strikes on four uncrewed aerial system in the Houthi-controlled areas of Yemen.

On 24 May, the US conducted strikes on one land attack cruise missile in the Houthi-controlled areas of Yemen.

On 29 May, the US conducted strikes on two missile launchers in the Houthi-controlled areas of Yemen.

On 30 May, the US and UK Armed Forces conducted strikes against 13 Houthi targets in the Houthi-controlled areas of Yemen. US aircraft from the USS Dwight D. Eisenhower aircraft carrier and other US warships in the area carried out airstrikes against underground facilities, missile launchers, command and control sites, a Houthi ship and other sites in Yemen. Royal Air Force Typhoon FGR4s also carried out strikes in Hodeida and against Houthi weapons and infrastructure. In Hodeida, the Houthis said that civilian homes and the headquarters of Hodeida Radio were targeted. The Houthis acknowledged 16 deaths and 35 injuries, the highest death toll recorded throughout the US and UK campaign.

Additionally, The US conducted strikes on eight uncrewed aerial vehicles in the Houthi-controlled areas of Yemen.

=== June 2024 ===
On 7 June, the Houthis' official news outlet reported four joint US and UK airstrikes on Hodeida International Airport and the Port of Salif, and two additional strikes on the Al-Thawra region.

Later that day, the US also conducted strikes on four Unmanned aerial vehicles and two anti-ship ballistic missiles in the Houthi-controlled areas of Yemen. Separately, US forces successfully destroyed a Houthi patrol boat in the Red Sea.

On 11 June, the US conducted strikes on two anti-ship cruise missile launchers in the Houthi-controlled areas of Yemen.

On 12 June, the US conducted strikes on three anti-ship cruise missile launchers in the Houthi controlled areas of Yemen.

On 13 June, the US conducted strikes on an air defense sensor in the Houthi controlled areas of Yemen.

On 14 June, the US conducted strikes on seven radars in the Houthi controlled areas of Yemen. The US said that the targeted radars had allowed the Houthis to target maritime vessels and endanger commercial shipping.

On 15 June, the US Central Command stated that its military had destroyed seven Houthi radar systems in Yemen that enabled the group to locate and target merchant vessels. It also claimed that a Houthi UAV and two USVs in the Red Sea were destroyed simultaneously.

On 17 June, the US and the UK had carried out at least six airstrikes on the Hodeida International Airport and four on the island of Kamaran.

On 19 June, the US and the UK carried out three airstrikes on sites located in Al-Taif area of Ad Durayhimi district in Al Hudaydah Governorate, and four airstrikes on the government complex in Al Jabin district of Raymah Governorate.

On 28 June, CENTCOM stated that American strikes had destroyed seven drones and a UAV ground control station in Houthi-controlled territory over the past day.

=== July 2024 ===
On 11 July, U.S and the U.K launched five airstrikes, hitting targets in the Ras Issa area located to the northwest of Al Hudaydah. The U.S. Central Command meanwhile stated that it destroyed five Houthi USVs and two UAVs in the Red Sea, and another UAV in Houthi-controlled territory.

On 12 July, CENTCOM stated that it had destroyed three UAVs in Houthi-controlled territory. meanwhile Yemeni media reported that the U.S. and U.K. had carried out three airstrikes on the Hodeida International Airport.

On 14 July that the U.S. and U.K. carried out an airstrike in the Midi district of Hajjah Governorate, two airstrikes on the Hodeida International Airport, and also struck the al-Buhaisi area in Al Hudaydah Governorate. The U.S. Central Command stated that the U.S. military had destroyed two Houthi UAVs and one USV in the Red Sea, in addition to destroying another UAV in territory controlled by the group.

On 26 July, the US and the UK carried out four airstrikes on Kamaran island.

On 27 July, the US and the UK carried out four airstrikes on the Hodeida International Airport, which according to residents struck Houthi targets.

=== August 2024 ===
On 3 August, the US Central Command announced that US forces had destroyed a Houthi missile and launcher.

=== October 2024 ===
On 4 October, the US Central Command launched four airstrikes on Sanaa and seven in Hodeidah, as well as in Dhamar and Al Bayda Governorates.

On 16 October, American B-2 Spirit bombers struck five underground weapons storage facilities in Yemen.

On 23 October, the US and UK-led coalition carried out two airstrikes on Hodeida International Airport.

=== November 2024 ===
On 9 November the Pentagon confirmed conducting multiple airstrikes targeting weapon storage areas. Houthi sources confirmed the attacks, no casualties were reported.

=== December 2024 ===
On 16 December, the US carried out an airstrike on a command and control facility in Sanaa that was used in attacks against US naval vessels and merchant ships in the southern Red Sea and Gulf of Aden.

On 21 December, CENTCOM announced that it carried out precision strikes on a missile storage facility and a command-and-control site in Sanaa. AlHadath reported that fuel depots, power stations, and military targets were hit. The strikes were initially blamed on Israel.

On 22 December, CENTCOM said a F/A-18 Hornet that had taken off from the aircraft carrier USS Harry S. Truman was shot down by friendly fire coming from the guided missile cruiser USS Gettysburg over the Red Sea. Its two occupants were rescued.

On 31 December, CENTCOM announced that US Navy warships and aircraft struck Houthi sites in Sanaa and Yemen's coastal regions over the course of two days, targeting a command and control facility and advanced conventional weapon storage and production sites. Several airstrikes were reported in Sanaa, and the defense ministry was also reportedly targeted.

=== January 2025 ===
On 8 January, CENTCOM announced that it conducted precision strikes on two underground advanced conventional weapon storage facilities in Yemen used to attack ships in the southern Red Sea and Gulf of Aden.

On 10 January, the Israeli Air Force (IAF), US, and UK conducted coordinated airstrikes on a power station and two ports in Yemen. The US and UK conducted 12 strikes on underground infrastructure north of Sanaa, while the IAF hit economic infrastructure.

=== March–May 2025 ===
During much of the January 2025 Gaza war ceasefire, which was agreed to on 15 January, Houthi attacks against ships in the Red Sea had largely subsided. The Houthis announced a resumption in attacks on 11 March, citing insufficient humanitarian aid entering Gaza.

On 15 March, fighter jets from USS Harry S. Truman, the US Air Force, as well as drones began a wave of naval and airstrikes against dozens of Houthi targets in Yemen, including radar systems, air defenses, and missiles and drones, in what was described by US officials as a start of a new offensive against the group that could last several days. The strikes were ordered by US President Donald Trump, who said that they targeted militant bases, leaders, and missile defense systems, and were the most intense since he took office.

Al-Masirah and other local media reported airstrikes in Sanaa at 1:30 p.m. ET, which a US official told CBS News was "just the start" of the campaign. A strike at a power station in Dahyan, Saada Governorate caused a power outage, and Houthi military targets in Taiz were also struck. Other strikes were reported in Al Bayda Governorate, Dhamar Governorate, and Hajjah Governorate.

According to the Associated Press, suspected U.S. airstrikes continued overnight into Wednesday, April 2. Houthi rebels reported that one strike targeted water infrastructure in the Mansuriyah district, not far from the port city of Hodeida, killing at least four people and wounding others. On 17 April, the US military said that it struck Ras Issa fuel port in western Yemen, saying that it was a Houthi fuel source. Al-Mashirah reported that the strike killed at least 80 people and injured at least 150 others. On 20 April, airstrikes killed 12 people and injured 30 others in Sanaa. On 28 April, Al-Mashirah and human rights organization Euro-Mediterranean Human Rights Monitor reported that US strikes hit a detention centre holding African migrants in Saada Governorate, killing at least 68 people and injuring 47 others.

On 29 April 2025, the UK struck a cluster of buildings that it believed were being used to manufacture drones. These were the first strikes authorized by Prime Minister Keir Starmer.

== Ceasefire ==
On 6 May 2025, U.S. President Donald Trump declared an end to the strikes on Yemen, stating that they were over, "effective immediately," as a result of a ceasefire between the U.S. and the Houthis, brokered by Oman. The Houthis agreed to halt attacks on vessels in the Red Sea but emphasized that the ceasefire did not in "any way, shape, or form" apply to Israel, which had just launched its own strikes on Yemen. While Trump framed the truce as the Houthis having "capitulated" and not "want[ing] to fight anymore," the Houthis claimed that it was in fact the U.S. that "backed down." According to reports, Iran played a role in persuading the Houthis to reach a truce with the United States to help build "momentum" for the 2025 Iran–United States negotiations. According to Israeli officials, Israel was not given "advance notice" of the U.S.-Houthi ceasefire. Israeli media described the ceasefire as "very bad news for Israel" and "doubly surpris[ing]".

== Assessments ==
Bab-el-Mandeb transits by cargo vessels
over 10,000 deadweight tonnage (approx.)

Before attacks

After first Houthi ship seizure/attack (19 November 2023)

After naval protection operation started (18 December 2023)

After US/UK attack on Yemen mainland (12 January 2024)

According to Lt. Gen. Douglas Sims, the director of the US military's Joint Staff, the initial strikes on 12 January successfully achieved their objective of damaging the Houthis' ability to launch complex drone and missile attacks similar to the one they conducted on 10 January. Two US officials, speaking to The New York Times, estimated that the strikes had damaged or destroyed about 20 to 30 percent of the Houthis' offensive capability. Despite damaging or destroying about 90 percent of the selected targets struck, the officials added that locating Houthi targets had proved to be more challenging than anticipated. On 18 January, Joe Biden acknowledged that the strikes had not stopped the Houthis from continuing to attack shipping, but said that efforts to stop them would continue.

According to Yemeni sources who spoke to Sky News Arabia, as of 21 January, at least 75 Houthi fighters, including six members of the Lebanese Hezbollah, three Iranian Revolutionary Guards, and two Iranian-backed Iraqi militants, have been killed in the ongoing bombing campaign.

== Reactions ==
=== Domestic ===
==== Yemeni government ====
The internationally recognized Government of Yemen issued a statement to Saba News Agency strongly condemning military actions by the Houthis blaming them for "dragging the country into a military confrontation arena for propaganda purposes" and "misleadingly linking it to support for Palestinians".

The government reaffirmed its right to enhance security in the Red Sea region, saying stability there and globally "cannot be achieved except by restoring the legitimate state institutions in Yemen." Reaffirming its support for the Palestinian cause, the Yemeni government warned that "the Israeli aggression in occupied territories risks further destabilizing the region and threatening international peace and security".

In an interview with Agence France-Presse, Aidarus al-Zubaidi, vice president of the Presidential Leadership Council and president of the Southern Transitional Council, said that the missile strikes were not enough to deter the Houthi attacks and said that "an international and regional alliance is necessary to secure international navigation in the Red Sea." He also urged foreign forces to support government forces in launching a ground operation against the Houthis in conjunction with the strikes.

==== Houthi movement ====
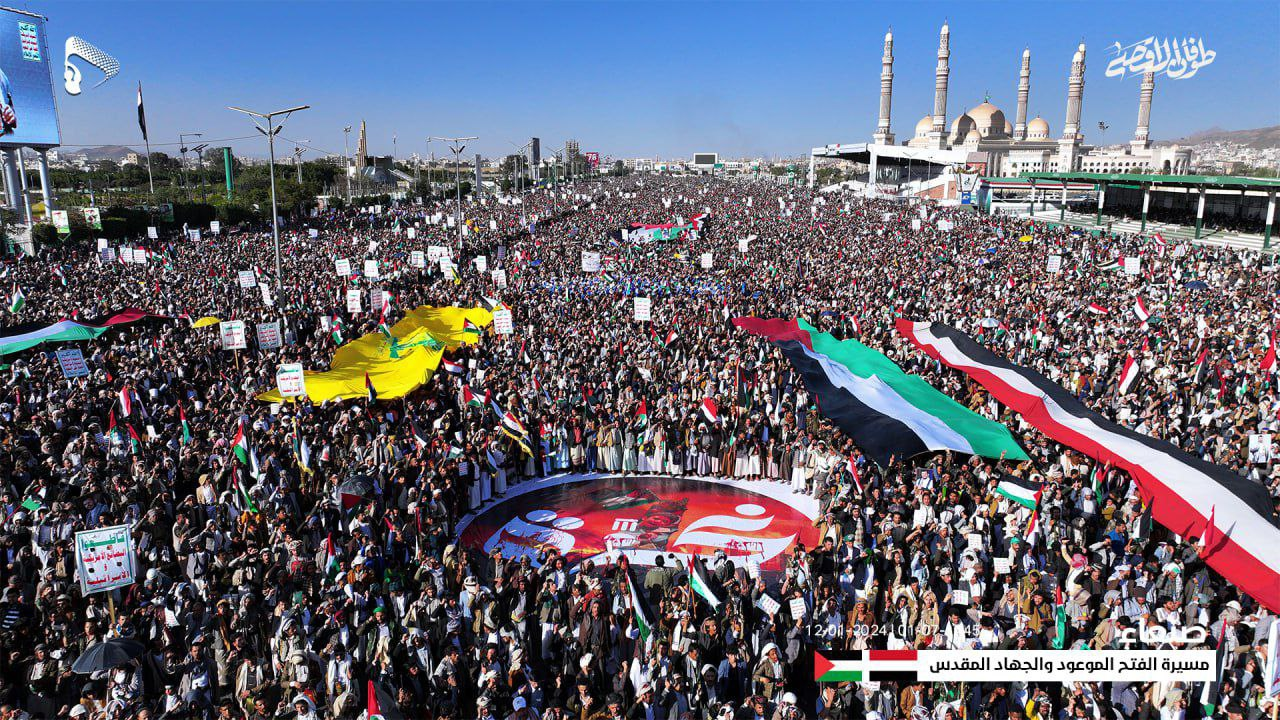
Protests in the Yemeni capital, Sana'a, in the aftermath of the missile strikes

Houthi deputy foreign minister Hussein al-Izzi called the attacks "blatant aggression" and said the US and UK would "pay a heavy price" in an interview with Al-Masirah. Similarly, high-ranking Houthi official Ali al-Qahoum vowed there would be retaliation. Mohammed Abdulsalam, a spokesman for the group, announced that the Houthis would continue to target Israeli ships or any ships heading to "the ports of occupied Palestine," saying that the US and UK were wrong to think that the strikes "would deter Yemen from supporting Palestine and Gaza".

Mohammed al-Bukhaiti, a senior Houthi official, stated, "Every individual in this world is faced with two choices that have no third: Either to stand with the victims of genocide or to stand with its perpetrators."

Following the initial strikes on 12 January, protests attended by hundreds of thousands of people were held in Sanaa and in other Houthi-controlled cities such as Hodeida and Ibb, to denounce the US and British military actions, with demonstrators chanting "Death to America" and "Death to Israel".

Following China Ocean Shipping Company, the fourth largest shipping company, and its container shipping subsidiary OOCL stopping all services to Israel, a senior Houthi official said Chinese and Russian vessels not connected with Israel will have safe passage.

=== Participants ===
==== United States ====
Reactions from the US Congress were mixed, with some supporting the strikes and others condemning Biden for using military force without congressional approval. Some critics said that in accordance with Article 1 of the Constitution, Biden needed to seek authorization from Congress before initiating military action. Under Article Two of the United States Constitution, the president has the limited authority to take defensive military action without Congressional approval, though supporters and opponents of the strikes disagree that the strikes can be considered defensive. Legal experts have argued that ambiguity in existing law allows for Congress to place limits on the president's authority to take military action without its approval. Senate Minority Leader Mitch McConnell welcomed the action but said the president's decision was overdue. Biden said that he has sent a message to Iran with the Yemen strikes.

Joe Biden stated that the "defensive action follows this extensive diplomatic campaign and Houthi rebels' escalating attacks against commercial vessels" and added that he would "not hesitate to direct further measures to protect our people and the free flow of international commerce as necessary". Following the airstrike on 13 January, Biden said that the US had sent a "private message" to Iran regarding the Houthis.

Protesters from Code Pink and the ANSWER Coalition gathered outside the White House several hours after the strikes. In New York City, pro-Palestinian protestors gathered at Times Square.

On 17 January, the Biden administration restored the Houthi movement to its list of Specially Designated Global Terrorist entities, but did not redesignate it as a Foreign Terrorist Organization.

According to a survey conducted by the Harvard CAPS–Harris Poll on 17–18 January 2024, 74% of American respondents supported strikes against the Houthis in Yemen.

==== United Kingdom ====
Rishi Sunak said that the strikes stemmed from the principle of self-defense. He also confirmed that the UK received non-operational assistance and support from the Netherlands, Canada, and Bahrain.

The UK noted that initial indications suggest the Houthis' ability to threaten commercial shipping has "taken a blow". The Liberal Democrats and the Green Party of England and Wales criticized the Sunak government for bypassing parliament, while the leader of the Scottish National Party in the House of Commons, Stephen Flynn, said that it was "incumbent upon the UK Government to appraise Parliament as soon as possible and MPs must therefore be recalled to Westminster".

According to a YouGov poll conducted on 15–16 January 2024, 53% of British respondents supported the government's decision to launch strikes against the Houthis in Yemen, while 22% opposed.

=== Other countries ===
- Albania: Defense Minister Niko Peleshi said that Albania supported the reaction of its the US and UK against the Houthis, calling the latter's attacks in the Red Sea "destabilizing, illegal and unjustified".
- Australia: Defence Minister Richard Marles said to reporters the decision to launch the strikes "was not taken lightly", saying that the action taken was about "maintaining freedom of navigation on the high seas". The Australian Greens party condemned the ruling government, stating that support for US and British strikes amounted to "a dangerous escalation at a time for peace".
- Belgium: Foreign Minister Hadja Lahbib expressed support for the strikes, saying that Belgium was "working with its EU partners and US ally to restore maritime security in the region and avoid any spillover."
- Canada: Foreign Minister Mélanie Joly and Defence Minister Bill Blair endorsed the attacks, with both of them stating the strikes were "consistent with the UN Charter".
- China: Foreign Ministry spokesperson Mao Ning urged restraint. UN ambassador Zhang Jun said the Security Council had not authorised the use of force in Yemen, adding that the strikes "not only caused infrastructure destruction and civilian casualties, but have also resulted in heightened security risks in the Red Sea."
- Cyprus: Foreign Ministry spokesman Theodoros Gotsis said that the Cypriot government was in "constant communication with the UK" within the framework set by the Treaty of Establishment regarding the use of British military bases in the country. He also called for an "immediate end to all actions that threaten free and safe navigation", given the country's "significant maritime footprint" in the region. The Cyprus Peace Council said British participation in the airstrikes in Yemen was turning Cyprus into a "war base" and announced plans to hold a demonstration outside the RAF Akrotiri base on 14 January.
- Denmark: Foreign Minister Lars Løkke Rasmussen stated Denmark's full support for the strikes.
- Egypt: The Foreign Ministry expressed "deep concern" over the escalation of military operations in the Red Sea and air strikes in Yemen, and has also called for "uniting" international and regional efforts to reduce instability in the region.
- France: Foreign Minister Stéphane Séjourné reaffirmed France's condemnation of Houthi strikes on commercial vessels, stating that "with those armed actions, the Houthis bear the extremely serious responsibility of the escalation in the region". However, the French government did not express support for the US and UK air strikes.
- Germany: Foreign Minister Annalena Baerbock expressed the German government's political support for the military strike, and said it was carried out "in accordance with the individual and collective right to self-defense of the United Nations Charter".
- Japan: Foreign Ministry spokesperson Kobayashi Maki stated that Japan supported "the determination of the United States and relevant countries to fulfill its responsibility in ensuring the free and safe navigation of vessels".
- Italy: The Presidency of the Council of Ministers confirmed it "supports the operations of allied nations, which have the right to defend their vessels, in the interest of global trade flows and humanitarian assistance."
- Iran: The Foreign Ministry condemned the strikes as a "clear violation of Yemen's sovereignty and territorial integrity" and a violation of international laws.
- Kosovo: Foreign Affairs Minister Donika Gërvalla stated "the Republic of Kosovo fully supports the proportional military actions of our international partners" against the Houthis, adding that Kosovo "as a deeply democratic country, clearly aligns itself with its strategic partners in joint efforts to maintain peace and security in the world."
- Netherlands: Prime Minister Mark Rutte expressed support for the attacks, stating "the US-British action is based on the right of self-defence, aims to protect free passage and is focused on de-escalation."
- New Zealand: Foreign Minister Winston Peters and Defence Minister Judith Collins expressed support for the strikes, with Peters stating that the "strikes support international security and trade, on which New Zealanders rely". Collins remarked that the strikes were "a good example of the international community uniting to address a serious threat to international security". On 23 January 2024, six New Zealand Defence Force personnel were deployed to the Middle East to help provide maritime security in the Red Sea including "precision targeting." The opposition Labour and Green parties criticised the deployment, citing the lack of a United Nations mandate and claiming it would inflame tensions. In mid-July 2024, the New Zealand deployment was extended until 31 January 2025.
- Oman: Foreign Minister Badr bin Hamad Al Busaidi said the attack went against his country's advice and that it would only add fuel to an extremely dangerous situation. State media reported that the Omani government denounced the military action from "friendly countries".
- Russia: Presidential spokesperson Dmitry Peskov called the strikes "illegitimate" under international law but also called on the Houthis to stop attacking commercial vessels, which he described as "extremely wrong".
- Saudi Arabia: The Foreign Ministry called for restraint and "avoiding escalation."
- Syria: The Foreign Ministry condemned the air strikes, stating that it was a "desperate attempt to divert the attention of world public opinion from the war crimes committed by Israel against the Palestinian people".
- Turkey: President Recep Tayyip Erdoğan accused the United Kingdom of attempting to make the region surrounding the Red Sea "a sea of blood".

=== Militant groups ===
- Hamas: Senior official Sami Abu Zuhri said in a press statement that "the US-UK aggression against the Yemeni forces' sites provokes the entire nation and indicates the intention to expand the conflict zone beyond Gaza's boundaries, which has repercussions".
- Hezbollah: The Media Relation Office condemned "the blatant US-UK aggression against brotherly Yemen, its security and sovereignty".
- Palestinian Islamic Jihad: In a press statement, the group expressed support for the Houthis and argued that "this aggression comes as part of the US and UK military aid to Israel and proves that the US administration is the one responsible for the Israeli genocidal war against the Palestinian people in Gaza".
- Popular Front for the Liberation of Palestine: In a statement the group condemned the strikes against Yemen and stated that the "Evil coalition's malicious goals are not to protect maritime navigation in the Red Sea, but rather to protect the security of the Zionist entity."
- Islamic Resistance in Iraq: Prior to the strikes, the IRI said that if Yemen is attacked by the US and UK, "we will attack the Americans' base with everything in our power". After the initial airstrikes, there were reports of a bomb and sirens being heard at the US Embassy in Iraq.

=== Shipping organizations ===
The Baltic and International Maritime Council (BIMCO), which covers 62% of world shipping tonnage, recommended that its members halt Red Sea transit for up to 72 hours as a result of the strikes. The International Association of Independent Tanker Owners (Intertanko) recommended that its members halt Red Sea transit for up to 24 hours.

=== Energy companies ===
QatarEnergy, the world's second largest exporter of liquefied natural gas, suspended sending tankers through the Red Sea. The LNG tankers were forced to sail around Africa via the Cape of Good Hope to avoid the war zone.

=== Relief organizations ===
A joint statement by 26 humanitarian organizations operating in Yemen raised concerns that the military escalation "will only worsen the situation for vulnerable civilians and hinder the ability of aid organisations to deliver critical services." It also urged all parties "to prioritise diplomatic channels over military options to de-escalate the crisis and safeguard the progress of peace efforts in Yemen."

=== Intergovernmental organizations ===
- NATO: A spokesperson said "these strikes were defensive and designed to preserve freedom of navigation in one of the world's most vital waterways."
- United Nations: A spokesperson for Secretary-General António Guterres said that he called for all sides "not to escalate the situation in the interest of peace and stability in the Red Sea and the wider region."

== See also ==
- Operation Prosperity Guardian
- Yemeni civil war (2014–present)
- 20 July 2024 Israeli attack on Yemen
- Operation Aspides
