= Yemeni Air Force =

Aerial warfare branch of Yemen's armed forces

Yemen Air Force and Air Defence
- القوات الجوية اليمنية والدفاع الجوي; Al-Quwwat al-Jawwiya al-Yamaniya wal-Difa' al-Jawwiy
- Emblem of the Yemen Air Force and Air Defence
- Founded: 1920; 106 years ago (founded); 1990; 36 years ago (current form)
- Country: Yemen
- Type: Air force
- Role: Aerial warfare
- Part of: Yemeni Armed Forces
- Engagements: Yemeni Civil War (1994); Houthi insurgency; Al-Qaeda insurgency in Yemen; Yemeni Revolution; Yemeni civil war (2014–present); Saudi Arabian-led intervention in Yemen; Houthi–Saudi Arabian conflict

Commanders
- Chief of Staff of the Yemeni Air Force: Major General Rashid Nasir al-Jundi
- Chief of Staff of the Yemeni Armed Forces: Lieutenant General Sagheer Hamoud Aziz

Insignia
- Roundel

- Fin flash

- Ensign of the Yemeni Air Force

Aircraft flown
- Attack: Su-22
- Fighter: F-5E, MiG-21, MiG-29
- Helicopter: Mi-14, Mi-17, Bell 206, Bell 212, UH-1H
- Attack helicopter: Mi-24
- Trainer: Aero L-39, F-5B
- Transport: An-26

The Yemeni Air Force (YAF; Arabic: القوات الجوية اليمنية, romanized: al-Quwwat al-Jawwiya al-Yamaniya) is the air force branch of the Yemeni Armed Forces. It inherited its aircraft from the former states of North and South Yemen who were supported by the United States and the Soviet Union during the Cold War, respectively. However, numbers of its aircraft can not be confirmed but serviceability of these aircraft is low, as a result of most of the air force being destroyed by airstrikes during the Saudi Arabian-led intervention in the Yemeni Civil War.

== History ==
=== Early Yemeni military flying ===
After being confronted by British air power during several conflicts in the 1920s, Imam Yahya, the King of Yemen, sought support from Italy in order to acquire aircraft for his country. In January 1926, an Italian was contracted to deliver six aircraft, the first three of which arrived in April. However, these were found to be in a poor state. After the Imam complained about this issue to the Italians, they agreed to provide Yemen with some better aircraft. In August, one was presented to Yemen. In 1927, 12 Yemenis were sent to Italy for flight training; with the help of an Italian team, a flight school was also set up in Yemen. A Junkers A 35 and a Junkers F 13 were acquired that same year. The A 35 crashed less than two months after its delivery, killing all three on board. This, along with language issues and renewed fighting with the British, caused Imam Yahya to stop the efforts to establish an air force.

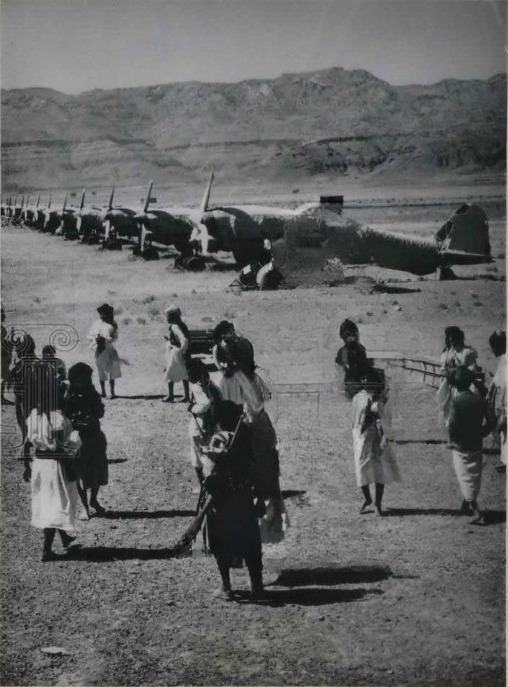
A row of North Yemeni Avia B-33s

This changed in the late 1940s, when several aircraft were bought from different sources: a single Amiot AAC-1 Toucan was purchased from Lebanon, as well as one Noorduyn Norseman from Egypt, and two Douglas C-47s from Italy. Two North American T-6 Texans were also donated by Saudi Arabia in 1955. In 1957, a major arms deal was signed with Czechoslovakia, including 24 Avia B-33 attack aircraft. However, due to a lack of support materiel and spare parts, none of these aircraft was ever flown in Yemen. In the same period, the Soviets provided four Mil Mi-4 and two Mil Mi-1 helicopters, as well as a single Ilyushin Il-14 transport aircraft. An aviation college was also created, and it was equipped with 10 Czechoslovak-made Zlin Z-126s that had been ordered together with the B-33s.

=== North and South Yemen ===
The Yemen Arab Republic Air Force (YARAF) was officially established on 20 November 1967. On this month, the Soviets delivered nine MiG-17 fighters and a single MiG-15UTI training aircraft, as well as four Ilyushin Il-28s, and three Antonov An-2s. Together with four MiG-17Fs, two Il-28s, two Il-14s and some Yakovlev Yak-11s donated by the Egyptians when they withdrew, and the remaining Zlin Z-126s, these aircraft constituted the whole fleet of the newly created air force as of late 1967. The YARAF was immediately engaged in the fighting against Royalist tribesmen, notably during the Siege of Sanaa. Some of the aircraft were flown by Soviet and Syrian pilots. While MiG-17s, Yak-11s and Il-28s attacked Royalist troops, Il-14s brought in supplies and evacuated the wounded from the besieged capital. During the 70 days of the siege, two MiG-17s were destroyed and their pilots killed, as well as one Yak-11 that was piloted by a Soviet, who was killed too. Five more airmen were killed during the siege, in unknown circumstances.

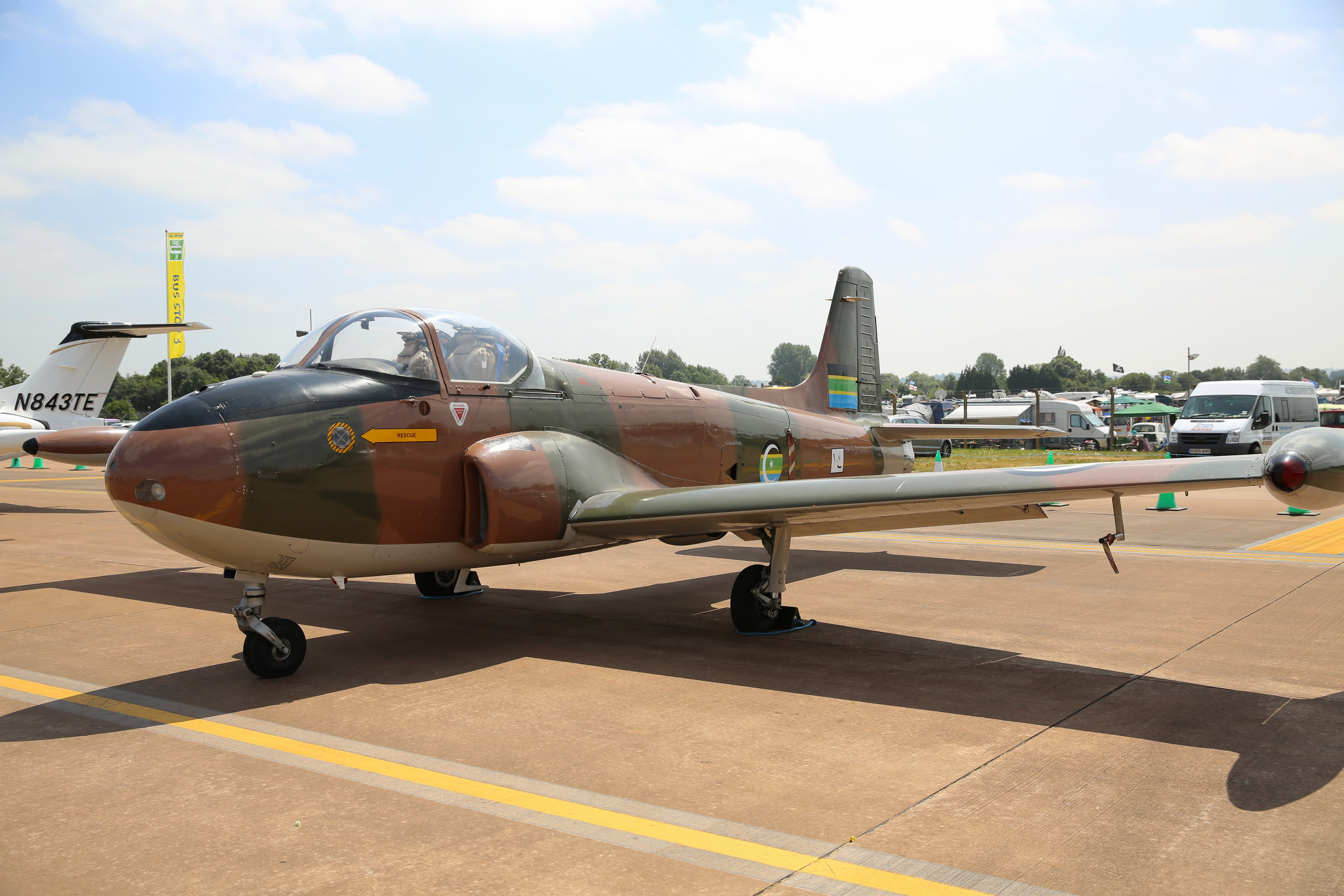
A BAC Jet Provost in South Arabian Air Force colors

Meanwhile, in what would then become South Yemen, the British had started to form an embryonic air force. Called the South Arabian Air Force (as an air corps of the Federation of South Arabia under British protection), it had received six de Havilland Canada DHC-2 Beavers, eight BAC Jet Provost Mk52As, six Bell 47G helicopters and four Douglas C-47s by December 1967. 9 Officers of the Aden Protectorate Levies were earmarked for training as combat pilots in RAF Khormaksar in 1965. Four BAC Strikemaster Mk 81s were delivered in 1970. When the Federation of South Arabia was released into independence, on 30 November 1967, it was instantly renamed the People's Republic of Yemen. A day later, the new country's air force was officially established, and named the People's Republic of Yemen Air Force (PRYAF). The nationality markings on the aircraft were changed too. Roundels and fin flashes using the colors of the FSA's flag were replaced by a light blue triangle with a dark outer part and a red star in the centre, and the new national tricolor flag with a blue triangle bearing a red star, respectively. In 1968, Soviet advisors arrived in the country to help build up the air force. The first 10 MiG-17Fs arrived in January 1969, and they were reinforced by eight more in 1970: these aircraft were used by No. 5 Squadron. On 1 December of the same year, the country was renamed the People's Democratic Republic of Yemen (PDRY), and the air force's name was changed accordingly. It was in this period that the triangular roundel was replaced by a circular one, consisting of the three colors of the national flag, with the top quarter being a sky-blue chevron with a red star in the middle. By 1972, the PDRYAF had received eight Mil Mi-8 and four Kamov Ka-26 helicopters, four Ilyushin Il-28s, and eight Antonov An-24 and Antonov An-26 transport aircraft from the Soviet Union.

=== Build-up and wars between the two Yemens ===
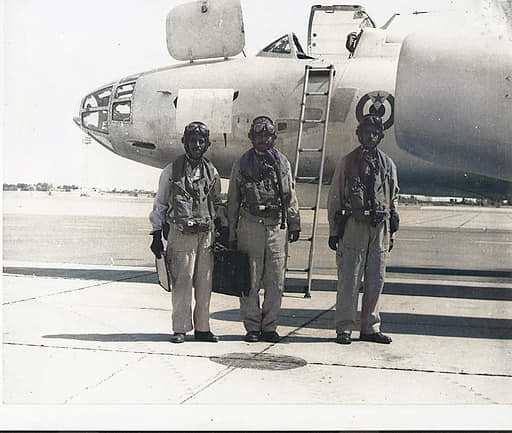
PDRY Air Force airmen in front of an Il-28

The PDRYAF participated in the short Yemenite War of 1972, flying transport missions in support of the ground units, and air strikes with its MiG-17 fighters. One of these aircraft was shot down by the Northerners, with its pilot killed. The North Yemeni air force isn't known to have been involved in the conflict, even though it received five MiG-17s and four Ilyushin Il-28s donated by Egypt and flown by Egyptian pilots midway through the war. However, these pilots weren't allowed to fly any combat sorties against the South Yemeni forces.

Shortly after the end of the conflict, the PDRYAF started receiving its first MiG-21MFs from the Soviet Union and East Germany. 36 pilots were trained in India and Indian Air Force and Cuban Air Force instructors were also based in PDRY. By 1974, more than 40 MiG-21s had been delivered. Around 1976, a dozen of Su-7 and Sukhoi Su-22s were delivered to replace the Il-28 bombers. In the frame of South Yemeni involvement in the Ogaden War, the PDRYAF sent 12 MiG-17Fs and two MiG-15UTIs to Ethiopia in 1977, together with pilots and ground personnel. Another contingent followed in early January 1978, including some MiG-21 pilots; one of them was killed when his aircraft, a MiG-21MF donated to Ethiopia by the USSR, was shot down by Somali air defences on 15 February. The MiG-15s and MiG-17s were never returned to South Yemen, and most of their pilots converted to Su-22s.

In February 1979, a new war between the two Yemens broke out. It was preceded by skirmishes that involved both air forces: on 25 February, a YARAF MiG-17 was damaged by a 9K32 Strela-2 MANPADS. On 28 February, the Southerners launched an invasion of North Yemen, and their air force bombed the Taiz airfield, and claimed to have destroyed up to six aircraft. Northern air defences were then bolstered and they shot down two PDRYAF Su-22s. In response, a campaign against the YAR's major air defence positions started, and most of these were destroyed. Moreover, three YARAF MiG-17s were shot down by PDRYAF MiG-21s. At the end of the war, the YARAF's combat aircraft fleet was almost completely destroyed.

Following the Yemen Arab Republic's defeat, Saudi Arabia and the United States arranged a $390 million arms deal, in which the Saudis would finance the acquisition of military hardware and transfer some of their own surplus weapons to the YAR. The United States delivered F-5E fighters and two Lockheed C-130H Hercules transport aircraft, while Saudi Arabia transferred four of its own F-5Bs to the YARAF. Saudi financial aid also enabled North Yemeni president Ali Abdullah Saleh to order new weapons from the Soviet Union. These included 60 MiG-21bis, 14 Su-22Ms, 18 Mil Mi-8s, three Antonov An-24s and three An-26s. Soviet advisors also helped repair some of the remaining MiG-15s, MiG-17s and Ilyushin Il-28s. This rapid expansion of the YARAF meant that foreign advisors were necessary to support its operations: while the Soviets helped with Soviet-built types, Taiwanese pilots and ground crews constituted the majority of the F-5 squadron's personnel until 1985, and they only left the country in 1991, after the unification. Moreover, the aircraft loss rate was high, due to the crews' inexperience.

Meanwhile, the PDRYAF was getting some reinforcements as well: six additional MiG-21s were delivered shortly after the 1979 war, while 40 Su-22Ms, Su-22M3s and Su-22UM3Ks were delivered by 1986. 16 secondhand Mil Mi-24A helicopters were also delivered in 1985-1986. For the southern air force, the first half of the 1980s was spent training in intensive joint exercises, in order to increase the armed forces' readiness in the prospect of a new war with the YAR. This period was brought to an abrupt end in January 1986, when a coup resulted in an 11-day civil war, colloquially known in Yemen as The Events. This short civil war resulted in the destruction of around 75% of the air force, while dozens of thousands of people fled to the North, including up to 40 PDRYAF pilots. Even though the Soviet Union subsequently delivered additional MiG-21bis, Mil Mi-25 helicopters, and a batch of between 12 and 14 Sukhoi Su-22M-4Ks, rebuilding the South Yemeni military to pre-1986 strength proved impossible.

=== Unification and civil war ===
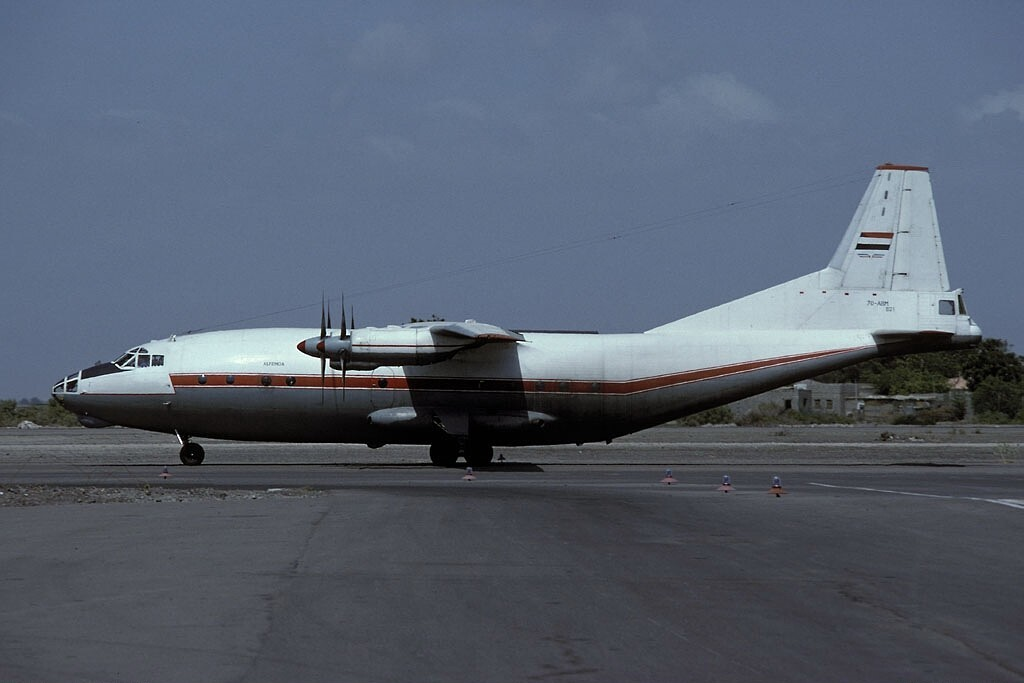
South Yemeni Antonov An-12 in 1992

On 22 May 1990, North and South Yemen were officially unified. The military forces of the two countries were to be gradually merged, but the process did not go as planned. Indeed, tensions started to rise up, and eventually led to the Yemeni Civil War of 1994.

Even though the PDRYAF had been considerably weakened by the 1986 civil war, its commanders still assessed it as superior to its northern counterpart, and expected it to establish air dominance. On the morning of 4 May, around 40 MiG-21s and Su-22s were sent to attack several targets in the north, including the Presidential Palace in Sanaa and several YARAF air bases. While these attacks caused significant damage and the YARAF did not react to it, the results still fell short of expectations. However, the PDRYAF kept on trying, and its Su-22 units performed several additional long-range bombing missions through the war, achieving notable results. Meanwhile, the YARAF was also using its own Su-22s, as well as MiG-21s, against targets in the south. YARAF F-5Es were also used in air combat and scored several victories. They allowed the Northerners to achieve local air dominance over crucial parts of the front lines. Since both air forces operated similar types of aircraft, friendly fire incidents were very common.

As the war continued, the Northerners' territorial gains and the losses took their toll on the PDRYAF. Even though its pilots often flew three or four sorties per day, the general situation of the Southerners was worsening. It was in this context that the PDRYAF introduced to service Mikoyan MiG-29 fighter-bombers. Bought second-hand from Moldova, these aircraft were flown by Eastern European mercenaries, and saw their first combat use on 29 June. Despite being the most modern combat aircraft available in Yemen, the MiG-29s did not provide the PDRYAF with an advantage in air combat, because their pilots were inadequately trained in air-to-air combat. Indeed, the only reported air-to-air action involving a MiG-29 was an encounter between one MiG and two F-5Es on 29 June. Neither side opened fire, and all three aircraft came away safely. The next day, South Yemeni president Ali Salem al-Beidh fled abroad, followed by thousands of South Yemenis. Dozens of PDRYAF members fled to Djibouti, Oman, and even the United Arab Emirates with their aircraft, while others fought to the bitter end. The war ceased on 7 July.

=== Unified Yemeni Air Force ===
While the unified air force took on the remaining aircraft of the former PDRYAF, including around a dozen each of MiG-21s and Su-22s, several MiG-29s, and some Mi-8s, Mi-17s and Mi-14s, it almost only consisted of the former YARAF. Its combat aircraft were concentrated on air bases in the north of the country, and it retained the YARAF's structure. In 1995-1996, two additional MiG-29s were bought from Kazakhstan. In 1996, the remaining Su-22s and Su-22Ms were withdrawn, and four Su-17M4s were bought from Ukraine. Most aircraft of the more modern Su-22 variants were then overhauled, a process which lasted well into the 2000s. In 1999, 12 Aero L-39Cs and 12 Zlin Z-242s were bought from the Czech Republic, and 12 more L-39Cs were bought from Ukraine in 2005.

Even though the appearance of MiG-29s in Yemen in 1994 did not have much of an impact on the air war, the type left an impression on Ali Abdullah Saleh's government. Correspondingly, in March 2000 negotiations were opened with Russia for the purchase of 24 aircraft. A year later, a contract for the delivery of 14 single-seaters and one MiG-29UB was signed. These aircraft, as well as those obtained from other countries, were to be upgraded to the MiG-29SM standard. Deliveries started in 2002, and continued until 2007. At that time, the Yemeni MiG-29 fleet reached its maximum strength, with a total of around 36 aircraft. These aircraft were the most advanced in the Yemeni combat fleet, as they were armed with R-77 air-to-air missiles, and Kh-29T and Kh-31P air-to-surface missiles.

=== War in Sadah ===
The Yemeni Air Force was used extensively against the Houthi insurgency in Yemen. The Yemeni Air Force was proven effective in destroying enemy positions and buildings. Most enemy casualties were attributed to air raids. A number of accidents did occur, including one in which a fighter plane accidentally fired a missile and killed more than 80 civilians. During Operation Scorched Earth on 2 and 5 October and 8 November 2009, three fighter jets reported as a MiG-21 and two Su-22 respectively crashed during military missions. The government claimed the crashes were due to technical malfunctions, while the rebels claimed they shot them down with MANPADS. In 2006, F-5Es, MIG 21s and Su-22s repeatedly bombed Houthi positions all over Saada.

=== War on Terror ===
As part of the Yemeni al-Qaeda crackdown, the Yemeni Air Force launched air raids on terrorist bases throughout Yemen to kill important terrorist leaders. The raids were confronted with anti-aircraft fire. After Ali Abdullah Saleh declared his support for George Bush in the war on terror, America provided Yemen with military aid. This included the Yemeni air force. The USA helped the YAF through training, funds, and munitions. They also provided them with Aircraft and Helicopters including 2 Cessna 208 light transport planes, 2 C-130 Hercules Cargo planes, 14 F-5E fighter jets, 1 CASA CN.295 medium cargo plane, 1 Beechcraft Super King Air, 3 Bell 206 helicopters, 6 Bell 212 helicopters, 3 Bell 214 helicopters, and 4 UH-1H helicopters. The Yemeni air force benefited immensely from US assistance. The US trained them in providing close air support for Yemeni Special Forces fighting against Al Qaeda.

=== 2011 Yemeni uprising ===
The Yemeni Air Force performed air strikes against opposition forces to the Saleh government during the 2011 Yemeni uprising. On 28 September 2011, a Su-22 was shot down during a bombing mission north of Sanaa by rebel soldiers using a MANPADS. The pilot ejected and was captured.

On 30 October, the al-Dailami air base, which shares the structures with Sanaa International Airport, was attacked by uprising forces. Different official sources reported two or three fighter jets destroyed on the ground either by mortar shells or with planted explosive charges. The aircraft were loaded with ammunition and combat ready for strikes on the next day. Among the destroyed aircraft, at least one MiG-29 was reported.

=== Saudi-led intervention in Yemen (2015–present) ===
On 19 March 2015, a first air raid against the internationally recognized Yemeni president Abd Rabbuh Mansur Hadi, indicated that at least some elements of the Yemeni Air Force had switched allegiance to fight alongside the Houthis rebels.

On 25 March 2015, two Yemeni Air Force aircraft, probably Su-22, took off from Sanaa Al-Dailami Air Base, which was under Houthis control, to launch an attack on the Yemeni president's residence in the al-Maasheeq district of Aden, becoming the third time in a week that elements of the Air Force acted against the internationally recognized government. The Houthis sent two Su-22s to bomb the presidential compound in Aden with one MiG 29 flying top cover. As the Sukhois made their first bombing run the Hadi loyalists responded with fierce ground fire but failed to shoot down any aircraft. During this attack, a few pro-Hadi MiG-29s scrambled from Al Anad Air Base to protect the presidential compound from Houthi -controlled warplanes.

During the initial days of the Saudi Arabian-led intervention in Yemen, Saudi Arabia Air Forces carried out air attacks on the Yemeni Airforce Al-Dulaimi Air Base next to the Sadaa International Airport, destroying one Beechcraft King Air 350ER surveillance aircraft, one CN-235 transport aircraft and two Bell 214 Huey helicopters.

The Yemeni Air Force did not completely join the Houthi rebels, as most of the personnel refused to take orders from their former enemy. Also the maintenance of the air-frames was mostly halted since the ousting of the Saleh regime in 2012 and thus, at the beginning of 2015, the situation of the Air Force seemed chaotic with most of the personnel deserted and air-frames lacking maintenance, effectively preventing the Yemeni Air Force to enter in the fight, remaining grounded during the Saudi-led intervention.

The following few days, the coalition strikes started targeting the structures and air-frames to a more severe extent.

On 15 April 2015, a Saudi debriefing showed the Arab coalition strikers destroying two Su-22 and one F-5 jet fighters while they were sitting on the tarmac. The F-5 looked covered by a net, while the Su-22s were parked in the open. Another picture showing the wrecks of two Su-22 and one F-5 jets emerged on 30 April 2015. On 4 May 2015, evidence of a Yemeni Il-76TD at Sanaa International Airport engulfed in flames emerged.

The fate of 10 Yemeni MiG-29 fighters remained unknown while the assessment on the number of other air-frames destroyed is difficult to establish. As of 2017 the Yemeni Air force after years of warfare and the Saudi-led coalition bombing is inoperable and non-functional. After government troops recaptured the Al Anad Air Base, the Yemeni air force was rebuilt and was trained by the UAE. They provide close air support. Houthis operate drones allegedly delivered by Iran.

In 2026, the Yemeni Government said they bombed the runway of Sanaa international airport to stop an Iranian plane from landing there on 13 July. On 25 July, military officials claimed their aircraft were used to target Houthi positions in Marib and al-Jaw. On 5 September, the Yemeni military said government warplanes were used to strike positions in Taiz and Hodeidah. After claiming each of these bombings were conducted by the Royal Saudi Air Force, on 16 September the Houthis released footage of a Saudi F-15 they said they shot down, which was verified by the BBC to show wreckage in a location west of Marib, and a tail number indicating it belonged to the 55th Squadron of the Royal Saudi Air Force based at King Khalid Air Base.

== Aircraft ==
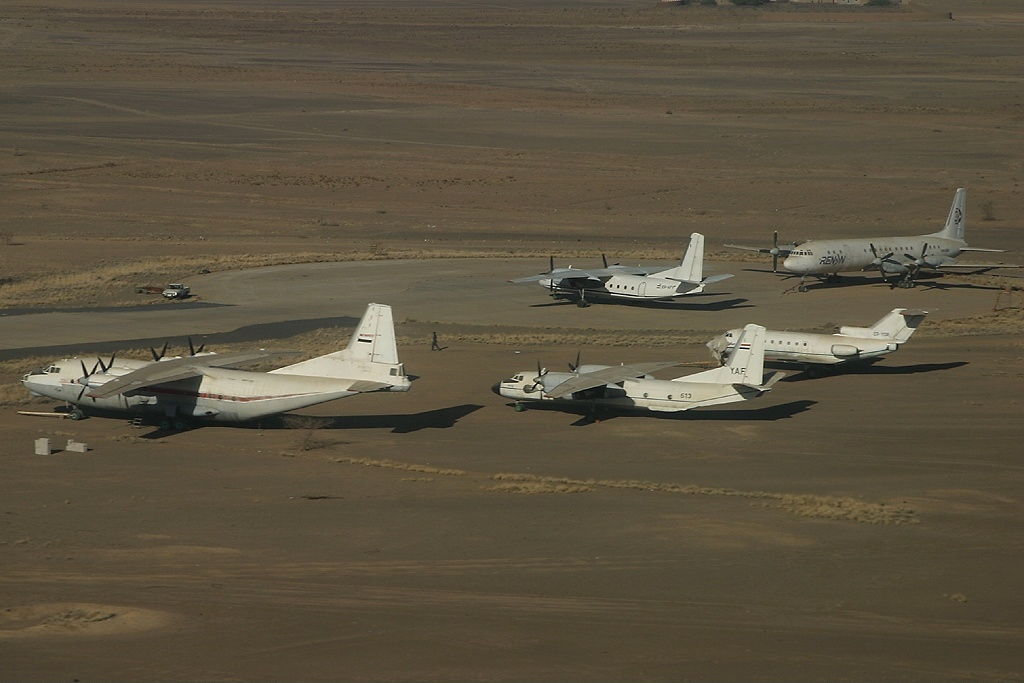
An Antonov An-12BK and a pair of An-26's at Sanaa International Airport

Aircraft	Origin	Type	Variant	In service	Notes
Combat aircraft
Northrop F-5	United States	Fighter	F-5E	10	
MiG-21	Soviet Union	Fighter	bis/UM	19	
MiG-29	Russia	Multirole	SE/UB/SMT	23	
Sukhoi Su-22	Soviet Union	Fighter / Bomber	M/M4	15	
Transport
Antonov An-26	USSR/Ukraine	Transport	An-24/26	3	
Helicopters
Bell 206	United States	Trainer	206B	1	
Bell 212	United States	Utility / Transport		4	
Bell UH-1	United States	Utility	UH-1H	3	
Mil Mi-14	Soviet Union	ASW / SAR		2	
Mil Mi-17	Soviet Union	Utility	Mi-8, Mi-17, Mi-171Sh	12	
Mil Mi-24	Soviet Union	Attack	Mi-24D/Mi-25, Mi-35	12	
Trainer aircraft
Northrop F-5	United States	Conversion trainer	F-5B	2	
Aero L-39	Czech Republic	Jet trainer	L-39C	28	

=== Retired aircraft ===
Retired aircraft include MiG-17F, Il-28, MiG-23, Strikemaster Mk.81, F-7 Airguard, C-47A Skytrain, C-130H Hercules, F27 Friendship, An-12, Super King Air 350 ISR, CN-235M-300, AT-802U, Yak-18, An-2, Il-10 (B-33), Cessna 208, H-13 Sioux, Mi-1, Mi-4 and Ka-32.

== Air defense ==
The Air Defense, once separated from the Air Force, according to the standard Soviet segregation of armed forces, was merged into the Air Force. Up to more than six hundred Surface-to-air missile launchers may have been procured over the time, including MANPADS, mostly if not all of Soviet and Russian origin.

There are about 8 Air defense brigades in the Yemeni air force. 6 of these sided with the Houthis and during the start of the Yemeni civil war, the Saudi-led coalition destroyed much of the systems and bases of 4 of these brigades, but two brigades survived the Saudi-led airstrikes as pro-Houthi army units scattered and hid most of the systems operated by these units. The remaining air defenses succeeded in shooting down two coalition F-16Cs, two Apaches and about a dozen UAVs. A new system built by pro-Houthi air defense personnel, which are originally R-27T air to air missiles guided by FLIR ULTRA 8500 Turrets and launched from APU-60 and P-12 launch rails, succeeded in damaging two Saudi F-15s. Defensive anti-aircraft gun (AAA) fire was clearly visible at night over Sanaa till mid April 2015.

On 25 April 2025, CNN reported that since the launch of the campaign in March 2025 by the U.S. targeting the Houthis in response to the Red Sea crisis, at least seven large USAF MQ-9 Reaper drones had been shot down. On 6 May 2025, both parties agreed the 2025 United States–Houthi ceasefire.

== Roundels ==
Mutawakkilite Kingdom of Yemen Air Force roundel (until 1962)

Yemen Arab Republic Air Force roundel (1962–1990)

South Arabian Air Force Roundel (1966-1967)

People's Republic of South Yemen Air Force roundel (1967-1980)

People's Democratic Republic of Yemen Air Force roundel (1980-1990)

== See also ==
- Military of Yemen
- List of equipment of the Yemeni Army
