= 2025 Houthi attack on Tel Aviv airport =

- Part of the Red Sea crisis and the Middle Eastern crisis (2023–present)
- Type: Ballistic missile attack
- Location: Tel Aviv, Israel
- Target: Ben Gurion Airport
- Date: 4 May 2025 c. 9:30 a.m. IST (UTC+3)
- Executed by: Houthi movement
- Outcome: Temporary suspension of flights towards Ben Gurion Airport; Beginning of the May 2025 Israeli attacks on Yemen
- Casualties: 8 injured

On 4 May 2025, the Houthi movement in Yemen fired a ballistic missile at Tel Aviv, Israel, hitting the perimeter of the main terminal of Ben Gurion Airport while leaving a crater and damaging a road and a vehicle. The Israeli defense system failed to shoot down the missile, despite several attempts to intercept it. As a result, eight people were injured—two of whom were injured on their way to a shelter. The attack caused air traffic to stop and several major airlines to cancel their flights for a few days. The Israel Airports Authority said the attack was the first time a missile landed so close to Israel's main airport.

== Background ==
Since October 2023, the Houthis had been targeting shipping in the Red Sea and launching ballistic missile and drone attacks on Israeli cities—including a successful drone attack on Tel Aviv in July 2024—in solidarity with Palestinians during the Gaza war. The group halted their attacks following the January 2025 ceasefire, but resumed them as soon as Israel broke the truce. In March 2025, the United States, under the Trump administration, launched large-scale aerial and naval strikes on Houthi targets in Yemen.

== Attack ==
In the morning of 4 May, at around 9:30 a.m. IST, a Houthi hypersonic ballistic missile—which the Houthis claim to have stealth technology, a range of 2,150 kilometres (1,340 mi), and a speed sixteen times the speed of sound—was launched at Tel Aviv. Despite several Israeli attempts to intercept it using the advanced U.S.-made THAAD system and its Arrow defense system, it ultimately failed to shoot down the missile. The missile landed near the main terminal of Ben Gurion Airport, leaving a huge crater while damaging a road and a vehicle. Eight Israelis were injured. Footage showed drivers on a road pulling over as the missile landed, creating a plume of black smoke near the airport. The Israel Defense Forces blamed "a technical issue with the interceptor launched toward the missile" for the successful Houthi missile, although it stated that it found "no malfunction" in the detection procedure.

The attack resulted in the brief suspension of flights at the airport, with some having to be redirected. All entrances to the airport were closed temporarily while train journeys were stopped. Several major airlines announced they were canceling their flights for a few days, including British Airways, Lufthansa, Air Europa, Air France, SWISS, Austrian Airlines, Brussels Airlines, Ryanair, and Wizz Air.

== Analysis ==
Military affairs analyst for Israel's Army Radio, Amir Bar Shalom, said the missile attack was "very accurate if you’re launching from 2,000 kilometers, it’s impressive," and that "you have to take this threat seriously."

== Aftermath ==
The day following the attack, the Israeli Air Force began bombing targets in Hodeidah with more than 30 aircraft, attacking nine Houthi targets using approximately 50 munitions. Among the attack targets was the Bajil Cement Factory east of the city. Reports from Yemen indicated there were dead and wounded at the cement factory. Houthi-linked media reported two people were killed and 42 others were injured. According to an Israeli security source: "We destroyed Hodeidah port and concrete factories that were used for manufacturing weapons." The following day, Israel bombed Sanaa International Airport, effectively disabling it.

== Reactions ==
- Houthi movement: The Houthi movement claimed responsibility for the attack "in rejection" of Israel's "genocide in Gaza". Houthi spokesman Yahya Saree said in a televised statement that Ben Gurion Airport was "no longer safe for air travel" and that "the American and Israeli defense systems failed to intercept the missile aimed" at the airport. Senior Houthi leader Muhammad al-Bahithi claimed that the hypersonic missile attack at the airport was "proof of our ability to strike fortified sites in Israel." Later, the Houthis said they will impose "a comprehensive aerial blockade" on Israel by repeatedly targeting its airports.
- Israel: Prime Minister Benjamin Netanyahu vowed to respond to the strike "at a time and place of our choosing, to their Iranian terror masters" and that "The US, in coordination with us, is also operating against them." Defense Minister Israel Katz also threatened "Whoever attacks us, we will hit back sevenfold," apparently referencing the Torah. Israel initiated airstrikes on Yemen the following day.
- United States: Following the attack, U.S. National Security Council James Hewitt said that the U.S. military will continue its attacks on the Houthis and that "the Trump administration remains committed to ending the Houthis' capabilities to hijack freedom of navigation in the Red Sea." On the same day, U.S. forces struck an area south of Sanaa with three air attacks. Despite this, the U.S. reached a ceasefire deal with the Houthis on 6 May.
- Hamas: Hamas praised the attack, calling Yemen "the twin of Palestine, as it continues to defy the most brutal forces of oppression, refusing submission or defeat despite the aggression it faces."
- (South Yemen) Southern Transitional Council: Summer Ahmed, the representative of the Yemeni STC to the United Nations, called the attack a "blatant act of terrorism," which is "part of a broader pattern of Houthi aggression."
- Iran: Iran denied responsibility for the Houthi attack on Israel. In response to threats to hold Iran responsible for the actions of the Houthis, Iranian defense minister Aziz Nasirzadeh warned that Iran will target the bases, interests, and forces of the United States and Israel if attacked. Iranian media lauded the Houthi missile strike as a major victory.
