= 2025 Israeli attacks in Yemen =

Airstrikes against the Houthi movement

- Part of the Red Sea crisis and the Middle Eastern crisis (2023–present)
- Locations of attacks within Yemen
- Location: Houthi-controlled Yemen
- Date: 5 May–5 October 2025 (5 months)
- Executed by: Israel Defense Forces; Israeli Air Force; Israeli Navy
- Outcome: Ceasefire: At least 13 high-ranking Houthi leaders killed
- Casualties: 61+ killed, 463+ injured

On 5 May 2025, Israel launched a series of airstrikes against the Houthi movement in Yemen, in response to a Houthi ballistic missile attack on Ben Gurion Airport the day before. Among the targets was Sanaa International Airport, which was bombed and destroyed along with several aircraft by the Israeli Air Force on 6 May. The Israeli Navy joined the campaign later in June. Prime Minister Ahmed al-Rahawi was the most senior Houthi official to be killed in the strikes and the broader Red Sea crisis. The Houthis and Israel halted their attacks in early October 2025, in the wake of the ceasefire in Gaza brokered by US President Donald Trump.

== Background ==
After the March 2025 ceasefire ended with Israeli surprise attacks on the Gaza Strip, the Houthis resumed attacking Israel with ballistic missiles. After 26 missiles were intercepted, on May 4, 2025, a ballistic missile hit near Ben Gurion Airport, causing the cancellation of many flights. As a result, Israeli Air Force aircraft attacked Hodeidah Port the following day with dozens of munitions.

== Attacks ==
=== 5 May ===
On 5 May, more than 30 Israeli Air Force aircraft attacked nine Houthi targets using approximately 50 munitions. Among the attack targets was the al-Imran cement factory east of Hodeidah. Reports from Yemen indicated there were dead and wounded at the cement factory. Houthi-linked media reported four people were killed and 42 others were injured. According to an Israeli security source: "We destroyed Hodeidah port and concrete factories that were used for manufacturing weapons." Although the Houthis condemned it as a joint raid of "US-Israeli aggression," the U.S. denied involvement. The Houthis halted their attacks on Israel in early October 2025, in the wake of the ceasefire in Gaza brokered by US President Donald Trump; the Israelis likewise stopped their airstrikes.

=== 6 May ===
On 6 May, Israeli forces targeted Sanaa International Airport, effectively disabling it by striking the runway, al-Dailami Air Base, the departure hall, and three civilian planes. The Israel Defense Forces claimed that the Houthis were using the airport to "transfer weapons and operatives." It also struck power stations in Sanaa, claiming that they served as "significant electricity supply infrastructure" for the Houthis. According to Houthi-linked media, three people were killed and another 38 were wounded. Three aircraft belonging to Yemenia were also reported to have been destroyed on the ground. According to the Airport director, Khaled al-Shaief, "around $500 million in losses were caused by the Israeli aggression" on the airport.

=== 11 May ===
On 11 May, the Houthi interior ministry reported that Israel struck the ports of Ras Isa, Hodeidah, and Salif after ordering the residents to leave. Houthi-run state media, however, denied that any Israeli attacks on Yemeni ports took place.

=== 16 May ===
On 16 May, 15 Israeli fighter jets bombed infrastructure at the Houthi-held ports of Hodeidah and Salif by dropping 30 munitions, claiming they were "used for the transfer of weapons" and reflected "cynical exploitation of civilian infrastructure by the Houthi terror regime to advance terror." Israel also warned that it would target Houthi leader Abdul-Malik al-Houthi if Houthi attacks on Israel persist. According to Houthi authorities, at least one person was killed while nine others were injured by the attack.

=== 28 May ===
On 28 May, Israeli forces bombed Sanaa International Airport and destroyed the last plane belonging to the country's flag carrier, Yemenia, claiming it was being used by the Houthis. Yemenia said that the plane was scheduled to fly Muslim pilgrims to Hajj in Saudi Arabia, and announced the temporary suspension of flights to and from Sanaa's airport.

=== 10 June ===
At around 07:00 on 10 June, the Israeli Navy launched its first operation against the Houthis, targeting the port of Hodeidah through two warships, one of them a Sa'ar 6. According to Reuters, an Israeli military official described the operation as "a unique long-range strike conducted from hundreds of kilometers away" which took significant planning. The Houthi affiliated al-Masirah channel reported two separate missile strikes hitting two piers at the city port, but no casualties were reported. Israel later assumed responsibility for the attacks, justifying them by claiming that the Houthis were using the port for transferring weapons. Officials estimated that the port, which plays a key role for humanitarian aid entering the country, would be rendered unusable for about a month.

=== 14 June ===
On 14 June, amid the Twelve-Day War, the Israeli Air Force launched an attack on a meeting of senior Houthi officials in a residential compound in Sanaa, in an attempt to assassinate Houthi military chief of staff Muhammad Abd al-Karim al-Ghamari. According to Al-Hadath, Supreme Political Council chairman Mahdi al-Mashat was attending the meeting. The Houthis declined to discuss the attack but affirmed that "we are not afraid of being targeted" and "every leader is succeeded by a thousand leaders." The results of the strike are currently unknown. An Israeli official later stated that al-Ghamari had been wounded in the attack, though this was denied by the Houthis.

=== 6 July ===
The Israeli military it carried out strikes against Houthi targets in Yemen around midnight on 6 July, attacking the ports of Hodeidah, Ras Isa, As-Salif, as well as the Ras Qantib power plant. They also reported that they had struck the Galaxy Leader ship, which was taken over by Houthi forces in November 2023 right after the war began. The IDF claimed that the Houthi forces had installed radar systems on the vessel to track other vessels in the international maritime arena. Israeli Defense Minister Israel Katz said the strikes were part of the newly named "Operation Black Flag."

=== 21 July ===
Israel bombed the port of Hodeidah early on 21 July in conjunction with its Deir al-Balah offensive in Gaza. Israel Katz said "The Houthis will pay heavy prices for launching missiles towards the state of Israel."

=== 17 August ===
Israel bombed an energy infrastructure site near Sanaa which it claimed was being used by the Houthis, in response to continued attacks. Earlier, the Israeli Navy reportedly attacked the Hizyaz power station. Al-Masirah said the power station was hit by an "aggression" which put some generators out of service and caused a fire.

=== 24 August ===
Following a Houthi attack on Israel on 22 August using a drone and a projectile with a cluster bomb warhead, the Israeli Air Force attacked four targets in Sanaa on 24 August using 35 munitions, marking the 15th time Israel attacked the Houthis since its first attack on 20 July 2024. The strikes targeted a military compound containing the presidential palace of Yemen, a fuel depot, and both the Asar and Hizaz power plants, calling them "a significant electricity supply facility for military activities." According to the Houthi-run Ministry of Public Health and Population, at least six people were killed and 86 others were injured in the attack. The next day, Anees al-Asbahi, a spokesman for the Houthi-run Health Ministry, said in a statement that 10 people were killed and 102 wounded in the strikes.

=== 28 August ===
The Israeli Air Force attacked a group of 10 senior Houthi officials in Sanaa watching a nationally televised speech by Houthi leader Abdul-Malik al-Houthi on 28 August 2025. According to reports, there were increasing indications that the Houthi defense minister and military chief were killed in the strikes, alongside others. The IDF carried out around 10 attacks within Sanaa. Yemen's Al-Jumhuriya channel, which is affiliated with the Houthis' opposition, reported on August 29 that Houthi prime minister Ahmed al-Rahawi was killed along with several of his companions in a separate Israeli attack on an apartment. On 30 August, the Houthis confirmed that prime minister Ahmed al-Rahawi was killed in the strike along with "several" other ministers. On 16 October, the Houthis confirmed the death of Houthi chief of staff Muhammad Abd al-Karim al-Ghamari as a result of the strike.

=== 10 September ===
The IDF struck Sanaa and several locations in Yemen, targeting "military camps manned by Houthi terrorists, including the Houthi propaganda apparatus, as part of Operation Ringing Bells," according to Israel Katz. The IDF reportedly targeted several areas in al-Hazm in Al Jawf Governorate, including a government complex, military camps, public information department offices, and a fuel storage site. Houthi president Mahdi al-Mashat vowed to respond to the attack, stating "the brutal Zionist aggression against our country is a failure." A spokesman for the Houthi-run health ministry reported that 35 people had been killed and 131 others were injured.

=== 16 September ===
Israeli Air Force struck 12 targets at the Port of Hudaydah. Israel gave an advance notice prior to the attack for people to evacuate the area. According to reports, the number of Yemeni civilians killed in these attacks reaches dozens. Houthi spokesperson, Yahya Saree, said that Israel had plans to attack further inside Yemeni territory, but the Houthi's air defenses thrwarted those plans.

Hours later, the Houthis fired a missile towards Israel, which was shot down.

=== 25 September ===
Dozens of IDF aircraft bombed Houthi security and intelligence targets (command headquarters of the Houthi General Staff) in Sanaa, killing 8 people and injuring 142. Targets included residential areas in the Ma'ain and Sabain districts, as well as the Dhahaban power station. The strikes took place the day after a Houthi drone attack on the southern Israeli city of Eilat injured 22 people.

=== 5 October ===
As reported by Al-Masirah, a missile launched from Yemen into Israeli territory has led to the suspension of operations at Ben Gurion Airport. In the aftermath of the attack, sirens have been activated in multiple regions of Israel.

== Aftermath ==
After the attacks in May, both Prime Minister of Israel Benjamin Netanyahu and Israeli Minister of Defense Israel Katz warned that the group would suffer more strikes and "heavy blows" respectively from the country if they did not stop their attacks on Israel, with Katz saying that Tehran, the capital of the group's funder Iran, will also be targeted. The Houthis dismissed those statements as Israel's "further evidence of bankruptcy".

Before Katz and Netanyahu's statements a day earlier in May, the Houthis announced that they would still continue to target the country's ships, despite Oman's wish for freedom of navigation in the Red Sea at the ceasefire for the United States attacks in Yemen, unless Israel starts sending humanitarian aid to the Gaza Strip.

On August 3, 2025, 150 members of the Iranian parliament issued a statement supporting the Houthi fighters, saying they are standing on the right side of history.

== See also ==
- US–UK airstrikes on Yemen
  - March–May 2025 United States attacks in Yemen
    - 2025 U.S.–Houthi ceasefire
- 2024 Houthi drone attack on Israel
- 20 July 2024 Israeli attack on Yemen
- December 2024 Israeli airstrikes in Yemen
  - 26 December 2024 Israeli attack on Yemen
- Israeli invasion of Syria (2024–present)
- May 2025 Gaza offensive
- Israeli attack on Doha
