= 2025 Eilat drone attack =

Houthi attack on Israel

- Part of the Red Sea crisis and the Middle Eastern crisis (2023–present)
- Footage of the attack
- Type: Drone strike
- Location: Eilat, Southern District, Israel
- Target: Hotel
- Date: 24 September 2025; 17:39 (UTC+03:00)
- Executed by: Houthis
- Outcome: Success: Drone evades interception attempts by Israeli aircraft and Iron Dome
- Casualties: 22 injured

On 24 September 2025, a drone launched by the Houthis from Yemen struck a commercial area in Eilat, a resort city in Israel, injuring 22 people. The casualty figure was one of the largest for Israeli civilians since the beginning of the Red Sea crisis. The drone had managed to reach the country as it had been detected later than usual by Israeli defense systems, and successfully evaded two interception attempts by the Iron Dome air defence system.

== Background ==
Since the outbreak of the Red Sea crisis in October 2023, the Yemen-based Houthis had launched numerous attacks on Israel utilizing drones and missiles, in turn provoking a response from the Israeli Defense Forces (IDF). The conflict had further escalated in August 2025 after the Houthis fired an advanced missile at Israel, which led to an Israeli airstrike assassinating the Prime Minister of the Houthi-led government, Ahmed al-Rahawi, alongside much of his cabinet. The Houthis vowed revenge for his death.

The resort city of Eilat had been the subject of multiple drone strikes in September; one which hit the nearby Ramon Airport and injured two people, and another which struck near a hotel within the city but produced no casualties.

== Attack ==
During the evening 24 September 2025, corresponding with the second day of the Jewish new year Rosh Hashanah, an explosive drone crashed near the Mall HaYam shopping area, metres away from a nearby hotel in the tourist-populated city centre of Eilat. The initial blast set off another explosion from a nearby electricity pole and ignited a fire at the site. Israel claimed that the hotel had been the target of the drone, which damaged several rooms despite not directly hitting it.

Magen David Adom (MDA) first responders arrived at the scene soon after to treat the wounded, while Israel Police and IDF units cordoned off the area and evacuated civilians. The fire at the site was also extinguished. Most of those injured were admitted to the local Yoseftal Medical Center, while two Israeli Air Force (IAF) helicopters transported those with non-minor wounded to Soroka Medical Center in Beersheba. MDA head Eli Bin reported that the strike inflicted "damage on a scale we are not used to seeing."

Initial reports declared that 22 people had been wounded in the strike. Of them, 19 had received only minor shrapnel wounds. Two people had sustained serious injuries; a 60-year-old man with shrapnel wounds to his limbs, and a 26-year-old man with injuries to his chest. A 30-year-old man was also "moderately hurt". Speaking to the Foundation for Defense of Democracies, expert Edmund Fitton-Brown said the attack represented "the most serious Houthi attack on Israel to date in terms of casualties."

The Houthis claimed responsibility for the strike in a statement by spokesperson Yahya Sarea released shortly after it took place. He said that two drones had been launched to Israel, suggesting that one did not succeed in striking the country. The IDF reported that the drone had been detected too late into its flight path to have military aircraft intercept and neutralize it. Home Front Command eventually detected the drone and instigated its siren system across Eilat, but did not give ample time for civilians to take shelter. The Iron Dome attempted to shoot down the drone twice but failed both times, possibly due to its low altitude by the time of engagement.

== Response ==
Avatar of ישראל כ”ץ Israel Katz

ישראל כ”ץ Israel Katz
(@Israel_katz)
tweeted:

Hebrew:

מאחל החלמה מלאה לפצועים מפגיעת הכטב"מ באילת.

הטרוריסטים החות'ים מסרבים ללמוד מאיראן, לבנון ועזה - וילמדו בדרך הקשה.

מי שפוגע בישראל ייפגע שבעתיים.

Translation:

Wishing a full recovery to those injured in the drone attack in Eilat. The Houthi terrorists refuse to learn from Iran, Lebanon, and Gaza - and they will learn the hard way. Whoever harms Israel will be harmed sevenfold.

24 Sep 2025

Prime Minister Benjamin Netanyahu spoke with Eilat mayor Eli Lankri shortly after the attack, promising a military response to the Houthis. He also stated that he discussed bolstering Eilat's air defense with IDF command. IAF commander Tomer Bar stated that an investigation would be conducted in order to address any faults in the drone defense system, and assured that "there is no reason to stop normal activity in the city." Defense Minister Israel Katz wrote a post on Twitter threatening that the Houthis would be "harmed sevenfold".

The IAF carried out airstrikes on Yemen's capital, Sanaa, on 25 September. Israel claimed that the strikes had hit "Houthi general staff's control headquarters, security and intelligence compounds, and military camps", though the group instead reported attacks on civilian targets, including the Dhahaban power station. The local health ministry reported the deaths of eight people and injuries to 142.

== See also ==
- 2024 Houthi drone attack on Israel
- 2025 Houthi attack on Tel Aviv airport
