= Al-Dailami Air Base =

Air base in Yemen

al-Dailami Air Base
- قاعدة الديلمي الجوية
- Sanaa Governorate in Yemen
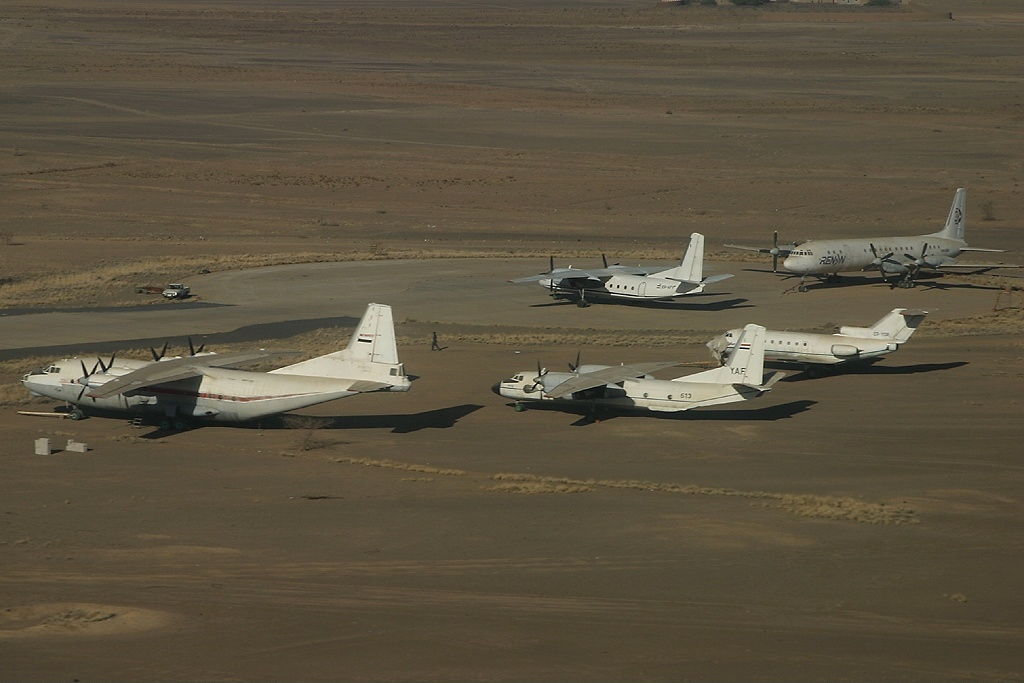
- Antonov An-12, Ilyushin Il-18, Antonov An-24, Antonov An-26 and Yakovlev Yak-40 at al-Dailami Air Base.

Site information
- Type: Air base
- Owner: Ministry of Defense (Yemen)
- Operator: Yemeni Air Force

Location
- Shown within Yemen
- Coordinates: 15°28′34″N 44°13′15″E

Site history
- Built: 1970s
- In use: 1970s–present

Airfield information
- Elevation: 2,199 metres (7,215 ft) AMSL
Runways
Direction	Length and surface
18/36	3,252 metres (10,669 ft) Asphalt

al-Dailami Air Base is an air base in Yemen. It is located 15 km (9.3 mi) north of the city of Sana'a and shares the runway with Sana'a International Airport.

== Military power ==
The 2nd Aviation Brigade, the 4th Aviation Brigade, the 6th Aviation Brigade, the 8th Aviation Brigade, the 110th Air Defense Brigade, and the 101st Air Defense Brigade are located at the base.

== History ==
=== 2011 Yemeni revolution ===
On 30 October, the air base was attacked by uprising forces. Different official sources reported two or three fighter jets destroyed on the ground either by mortar shells or with planted explosive charges. The aircraft were loaded with ammunition and combat ready for strikes on the next day. Among the destroyed aircraft, at least one MiG-29 was reported.

=== Airstrikes ===
According to the Yemen Data Project, Al-Dailami was the target of 154 Saudi-led coalition air raids, with up to 456 individual airstrikes hitting the air base between 26 March 2015 and 21 January 2022.

On January 12 2024, the US and the UK started attacks against Houthi targets in Yemen by conducting an airstrike on the airbase. On January 13, the US conducted a cruise missile attack on radar facilities at the airbase.

On 6 May 2025, the Israeli Air Force conducted an airstrike on the airbase.

== See also ==
- List of airports in Yemen
- Republic of Yemen Armed Forces
- Al Anad Air Base
