= 2025 United States–Houthi ceasefire =

2025 ceasefire agreement in the Yemeni civil war

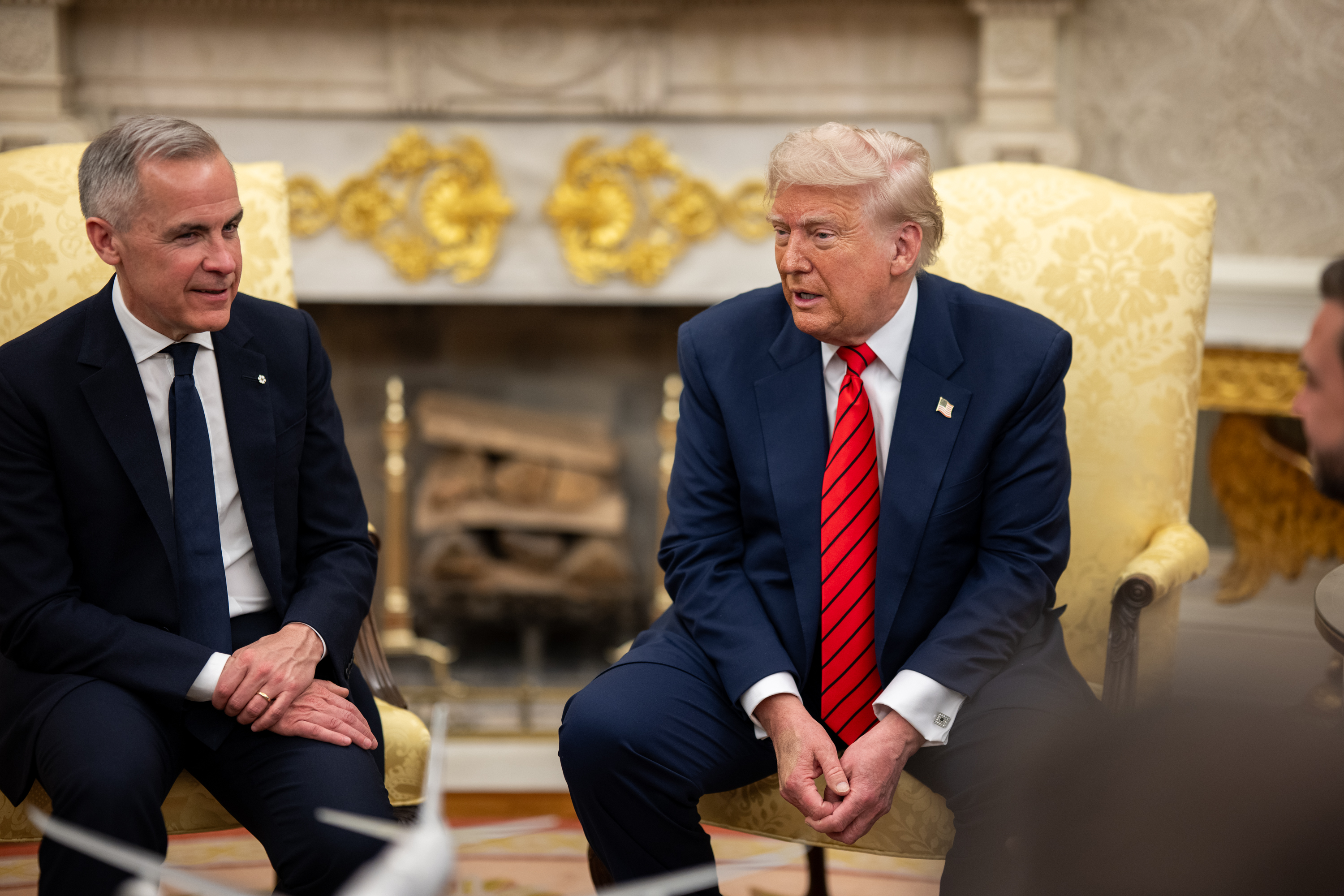
- Trump announces the ceasefire during a meeting with Canadian Prime Minister Mark Carney, May 6, 2025
- Context: Ending Operation Prosperity Guardian and US–UK airstrikes on Yemen
- Effective: May 6, 2025
- Mediators: Oman
- Parties: United States; Houthis

On May 6, 2025, a ceasefire deal between the United States and the Houthi movement in Yemen—brokered by Oman—took hold, ending the March–May 2025 United States attacks in Yemen, as well as the wider US–UK airstrikes on Yemen since the beginning of the Red Sea crisis. The Houthis agreed to halt their attacks on U.S. vessels but otherwise would continue their attacks on vessels in the Red Sea and emphasized that the ceasefire did not in "any way, shape, or form" apply to Israel, which had begun launching its own strikes on Yemen.

== Background ==
U.S. striking Houthi positions in Yemen on March 15

The Houthi movement began targeting international shipping in October 2023, after Israel invaded the Gaza Strip in response to the October 7 attacks. Claiming solidarity with Palestinians and aiming to pressure Israel into agreeing to a ceasefire and lifting its blockade of Gaza, the Houthis launched missiles and drones at vessels traveling near Yemen, and also fired ballistic missiles and launched drone attacks at Israeli cities, killing at least one civilian in Tel Aviv and striking the perimeter of Ben Gurion Airport. In response, the United States, the United Kingdom, and a multinational coalition began Operation Prosperity Guardian, combining naval escorts with episodic airstrikes on Houthi military and civilian infrastructure. On January 12, 2024, the United States, along with the United Kingdom, began launching cruise missile and airstrikes against Houthi targets in Yemen in response to Houthi attacks on ships in the Red Sea.

The Houthis halted their attacks on vessels following the January 2025 Gaza war ceasefire, but immediately resumed the attacks after Israel ended the ceasefire by bombing the Gaza Strip in March 2025. As a result, the United States launched a large campaign of air and naval strikes against Houthi targets in Yemen on March 15, 2025, including radar systems, air defenses, and ballistic and drone launch sites used by the Houthis.

== Ceasefire deal ==
Trump announcing the ceasefire with Carney

On May 6, 2025, U.S. president Donald Trump declared an end to the strikes on Yemen, stating that they were over, "effective immediately," as a result of a ceasefire between the U.S. and the Houthis, brokered by Oman. The announcement took place during a meeting with Canadian Prime Minister Mark Carney at the Oval Office. The Houthis agreed to halt attacks on vessels in the Red Sea but emphasized that the ceasefire did not in "any way, shape, or form" apply to Israel. While Trump framed the truce as the Houthis having "capitulated" and not "want[ing] to fight anymore," while also having shown "a lot of bravery," the Houthis stated that it was in fact the U.S. that "backed down." Administration officials interviewed by The New York Times said that Trump agreed to the cease fire because the airstrikes were not achieving their objectives and the United States failed to achieve air superiority against the Houthis. According to reports, Iran played a role in persuading the Houthis to reach a truce with the United States to help build "momentum" for the 2025 Iran–United States negotiations.

In response to Israeli backlash, U.S. ambassador to Israel Mike Huckabee said that the United States does not require Israeli approval to reach a ceasefire deal, asserting that the United States will take action against threats to U.S. citizens and not necessarily Israel.

== Aftermath ==
Amid the intensification of the Iran–Israel Twelve-Day war in June 2025, the Houthis vowed to join the war on the side of Iran if the United States assisted Israel in offensive strikes against Iran. Following the U.S. strikes on Iran on June 21, the Houthis indicated they would end the ceasefire, but there has been no resumption of hostilities. The Houthis resumed attacks on non-U.S. vessels in the Red Sea on July 6, 2025, sinking the Liberian-flagged cargo ship Magic Seas, during the attack killed three mariners and wounded two others.

== Analysis ==
According to former U.S. Middle East envoy Dennis Ross, the U.S.–Houthi truce sidelined the Israeli government, indicating that "the Trump Administration thinks about America's interests." Analysts also noted that the Houthis are the "biggest winners" of the ceasefire, as they will continue to target Israel and Israeli-linked vessels.

== Reactions ==
- Israel: Following the ceasefire deal, Israeli prime minister Benjamin Netanyahu asserted that "Israel will defend itself by itself." Israeli Defense Minister Israel Katz said that "Israel must be able to defend itself by itself against any threat and any enemy." According to Israeli officials, Israel was not given "advance notice" of the U.S.-Houthi ceasefire. Israeli media described the ceasefire as "very bad news for Israel" and "doubly surpris[ing]".
- Iran: Iranian foreign ministry spokesman Esmaeil Baqaei welcomed the cessation of attacks and praised the "steadfastness and perseverance" of Yemenis supporting the Palestinian people.
- Saudi Arabia: The Saudi foreign ministry welcomed the ceasefire in Yemen "with the aim of protecting international navigation and trade."
- United Nations: UN secretary general deputy spokesperson Stephanie Tremblay welcomed the ceasefire and commended Oman's efforts in securing the agreement.
