= Sanaa International Airport =

Airport in Yemen

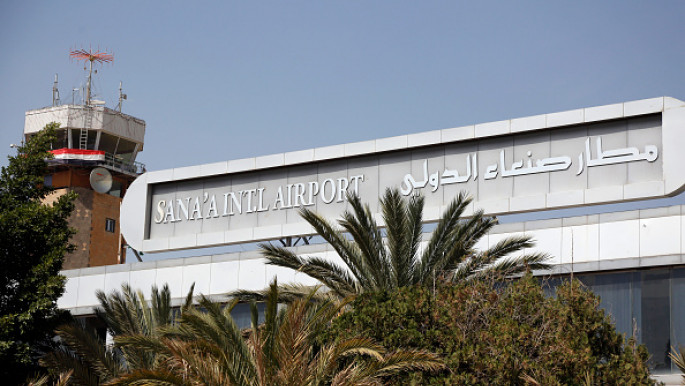
- IATA: SAH; ICAO: OYSN

Summary
- Airport type: Public/Military
- Owner: Yemeni Government
- Serves: Sanaa
- Location: Sanaa
- Opened: 1964
- Hub for: Yemenia
- Elevation AMSL: 7,216 ft (2,199 m)
- Coordinates: 15°28′35″N 044°13′11″E

Map
- Location within Yemen

Runways
Direction	Length		Surface
Direction	ft	m	Surface
18/36	10,669	3,252	Asphalt

Sanaa International Airport (IATA: SAH, ICAO: OYSN) is the primary international airport of Yemen located in Sanaa, the capital of Yemen. It serves Sanaa City, as well as the entire population of the northern provinces of Yemen. Initially, a small passenger terminal was built in the 1970s. The runway is shared with the large Al-Dailami Air Base.

== History ==
Due to the Saudi Arabian-led intervention in Yemen, a no-fly zone was imposed over the entire country in March 2015, and civilian flights ceased operation. The only flights operating from then on were flights by foreign countries to evacuate their nationals. The militaries of India and Pakistan evacuated their citizens from Yemen as the war began.

On 29 April 2015, the airport was the target of severe bombardment from the Royal Saudi Air Force. The sole runway and the passenger terminal building was severely damaged and was deemed unusable for the foreseeable future. On 9 August 2016, the airport was closed down once again after resumption of services by Yemenia due to closure of airspace by the Saudi-led coalition.

On 6 November 2017, in response to a Houthi missile landing in Saudi Arabia, the Saudi authorities closed the airport along with all other routes into Yemen. On 14 November of that year, the Saudi Air Force bombed the airport, inflicting damage upon it. On 23 November 2017, the authorities allowed the airport to reopen for aid flights, along with the port of Hodeidah. On 25 November, four planes carrying humanitarian aid landed in Sanaa, the first such planes to land since the total blockade had been imposed.

On 3 February 2020, a United Nations plane carrying seven seriously ill Yemenis took off on a mercy flight to Jordan. In December 2021, the airport was targeted by Saudi Arabian airstrikes. Civilians were reportedly evacuated before the airstrikes were launched but the airport was heavily damaged.

On 16 May 2022, commercial flights from the airport resumed after six years. The first Yemenia flight carried 151 passengers to the Jordanian capital Amman. On 28 July 2024, it was announced that Yemenia would resume flights from Sanaa International Airport to Egypt, (Note: Flights between Sanaa and Cairo had been halted since late 2016.) and India in the following week. However, that was cancelled.

On 25 May 2025, for the first time since the start of the civil war the first plane carrying Yemeni pilgrims departed directly from Sanaa International Airport en route to the Saudi city of Jeddah, marking the beginning of Hajj pilgrimage season. Khaled Al-Shaif, Director of Sanaa International Airport, stated in a press release that approximately 2,000 pilgrims will be transported directly from the airport to the holy sites.

On 13 July 2026, the Presidential Leadership Council (the internationally recognized government of Yemen) and Saudi Arabia launched airstrikes on the airport, allegedly to prevent an Iranian plane from landing. The Houthis retaliated by launching numerous missiles and drones against Saudi Arabia's Abha International Airport.

=== 2024 and 2025 Israeli airstrikes ===
CCTV footage of the Israeli airstrike on the Sanaa Airport tower (26 December 2024)

The Israeli Air Force conducted airstrikes on Sanaa International Airport twice; the first time was in response to Houthi attacks targeting population centers in Israel, and was conducted on 26 December 2024 during a speech by Houthi leader Abdul-Malik al-Houthi.

On 6 May 2025, following a warning issued by the Israel Defense Forces to all residents near Sanaa International Airport, along with 10 other sites in the country, airport buildings were destroyed along with several aircraft by an Israeli airstrike. Three aircraft belonging to Yemenia were also reported to have been destroyed on the ground.

This attack came less than 24 hours after Israeli forces bombed Hodeidah International Airport following Houthi strikes on the Ben Gurion airport near Tel Aviv. Reacting to the strikes on Sanaa Airport, Israeli Prime Minister Benjamin Netanyahu stated "we attacked in the past, we will attack in the future." According to the Airport director, Khaled al-Shaief, "around $500 million in losses were caused by the Israeli aggression" on the airport. The airport received its first flight from Queen Alia International Airport 11 days after the airstrikes. On 28 May, another Israeli airstrike destroyed a Yemenia aircraft that had been chartered to take Hajj pilgrims to Mecca before it could be boarded. The aircraft was the last civilian aircraft that Yemenia Airways was operating from the airport.

== Facilities ==
The airport has one 3,200-meter-long runway, an apron with 27 parking spaces, and a passenger terminal. Ground Handling and Fueling (JET A-1), are provided by Civil Airlines, forwarders, and operators like Yemenia.

== Operations ==
In 2007, the airport handled about 1.7 million passengers, representing 80% of all air passengers in Yemen and 87% of all international passengers. During that year, there were 38 flights per day on average.

== Accidents and incidents ==
- On 14 September 1994, Al-Yemda Boeing 737 flight from Aden to Sanaa, Yemen, was hijacked by a man with a hand grenade. He reportedly demanded to be taken to Saudi Arabia. When the hijacker went into the flight deck, he was overpowered by security personnel who had entered the plane and was arrested.
- On 30 October 2011, a shelling attack by opposition tribesmen on the neighbouring air force base damaged the airport's runway, forcing incoming flights to be diverted to Aden. There were no reports of casualties, although an ammunition storage and two fighter jets were destroyed.
- On 21 November 2012, an Antonov An-26 crashed in the abandoned Al-Hasaba Marketplace. Pilots saw that there was an engine which caught fire. The aircraft was operated by the Yemeni Air Force.
- On 19 February 2013, a Yemeni Air Force fighter plane, a Sukhoi Su-17, crashed onto a building shortly after taking off from Sanaa International Airport close to a busy road. The crash location was behind a local hospital. Eighteen people died and 16 were injured. Yemeni Air Force was concerned in the aftermath of two plane crashes.
- On 23 June 2014, British citizen and pro-democracy campaigner Andargachew Tsige was controversially arrested at Sanaa airport and later extradited to Ethiopia.
- On 26 March 2015, the Royal Saudi Air Force bombed positions in Sanaa, including the airport, in reaction to the Houthi takeover in Yemen.

== See also ==
- List of airports in Yemen
