= 10 January 2025 Israeli attack on Yemen =

10 January Israeli attack on Yemen
- Part of the Red Sea Crisis, and the Middle Eastern crisis (2023–present)
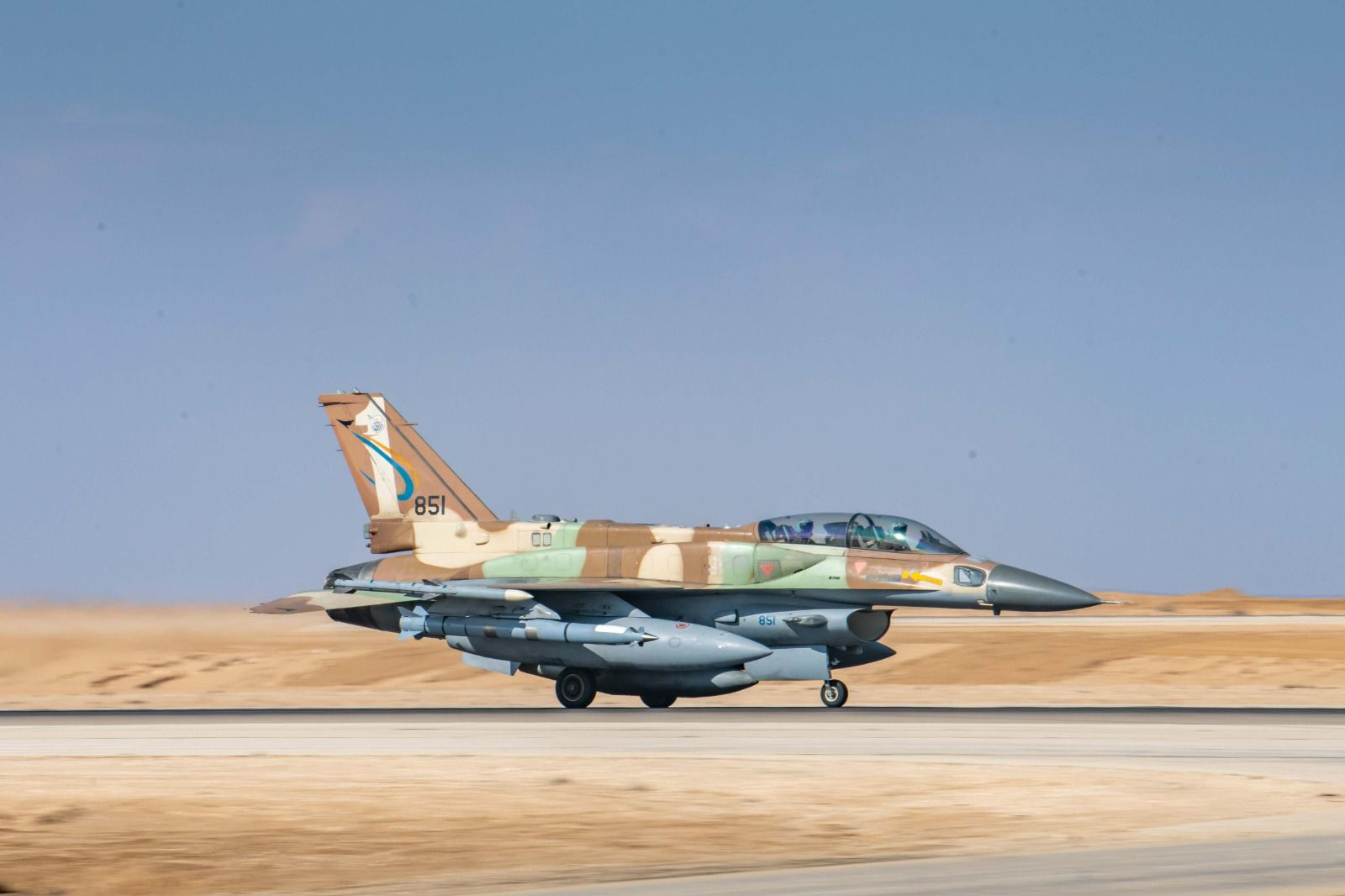
- Type: Airstrikes
- Location: Yemen
- Date: 10 January 2025
- Executed by: Israel Defense Forces; Israeli Air Force
- Casualties: At least 1 killed

On 10 January 2025, the Israeli Air Force conducted airstrikes with the involvement of American and British Air Forces on multiple targets in the coastal strip controlled by the Houthi Movement and deep inside Yemen. According to Israel, the attacks targeted 30 locations in Sanaa and Al Hudaydah, including the 70th Square area, infrastructure at the "Hizaz" power station, as well as 12 targets in Amran Governorate focusing on underground command facilities and missile depots. The strikes were carried out in response to the Houthis' continued launching of missiles and unmanned aerial vehicles (UAVs) toward Israel, and took place immediately after separate military operations by the United States and United Kingdom in Yemen amid the Houthi involvement in the Gaza War.

== Background ==
The Houthis are a Shia-Zaidi armed movement operating in northwestern Yemen, supported by Iran and considered a terrorist organization by the United States, the United Arab Emirates, and other countries. The movement opposes the formal government of Yemen and has controlled a large area along the Red Sea since 2014.

After the start of the Gaza war on 7 October 2023, the Houthis began launching missiles and UAVs toward Israel. Additionally, the Houthis attacked international ships in the Red Sea in actions defined as international crimes that even led to military responses against them from several countries. In January 2024, the United Nations Security Council adopted Resolution 2722, condemning the Houthi attacks. Operation Prosperity Guardian led by the United States began protecting shipping in the Red Sea. From 12 January, the United States and the United Kingdom led airstrikes and missile attacks against the Houthis, while other countries independently patrolled the waters adjacent to Yemen and attacked Houthi vessels in the Red Sea.

In previous Israeli responses to Houthi attacks, Israel conducted Operation Long Arm on 20 July 2024, another attack on 29 September 2024, Operation White City on 19 December 2024, and Operation Vineyard Sounds on 26 December 2024.

== Course of the attack ==
Early on the morning of 10 January it was reported that the United States Air Force and the Royal Air Force had begun strikes, after which the Israeli Air Force also joined the attacks.

30 targets were attacked in Sanaa and Al Hudaydah, including the area of the 70th Square, the weekly demonstration center, infrastructure at the "Hizaz" power station, and more.

In Amran Governorate 12 targets were attacked, focusing on underground command facilities and missile depots according to Saudi reports.

== Aftermath ==
After the attack Israeli Minister of Defense Israel Katz said, "Hodeidah Port is paralyzed and Ras Isa is burning – there will be no immunity for anyone. We will also hunt down the heads of Houthi terrorism".

== See also ==
- Operation White City
- Operation Long Arm
