= AXB =

AXB may refer to:

- Air India Express, India, ICAO airline code AXB
- Maxson Airfield, Alexandria Bay, New York, former IATA airport code AXB
- Boeing AXB, a variant of the Boeing P-12 1930s aircraft
