= VF-11 =

Fighter Squadron 11
- Active: 1 February 1927 – 15 February 1959
- Country: United States
- Branch: United States Navy
- Role: Fighter aircraft
- Part of: Inactive
- Nickname(s): Red Rippers
- Engagements: World War II; Korean War; 1958 Lebanon crisis

Aircraft flown
- Fighter: F6C-3 Hawk; F3B-1; F4B-1; FF-1; F3F-1; F4F-3 Wildcat; F6F Hellcat; F8F Bearcat; F2H-2/4 Banshee; F3D-2 Skynight

Fighter Squadron 11 or VF-11 was an aviation unit of the United States Navy. It was originally established as VF-5 on 1 February 1927, redesignated as VF-5S on 1 July 1927, redesignated as VF-5B in January 1928, redesignated VB-1B on 1 July 1928, redesignated VF-5B on 1 July 1930, redesignated VF-5S in July 1932, redesignated VF-5B in April 1933, redesignated VF-4 on 1 July 1937, redesignated VF-41 on 15 March 1941, redesignated VF-4 on 4 August 1943, redesignated VF-1A on 15 November 1946, redesignated VF-11 on 2 August 1948 and disestablished on 15 February 1959. It was the second US Navy squadron to be designated VF-11.

== Operational history ==
=== 1920s-30s ===
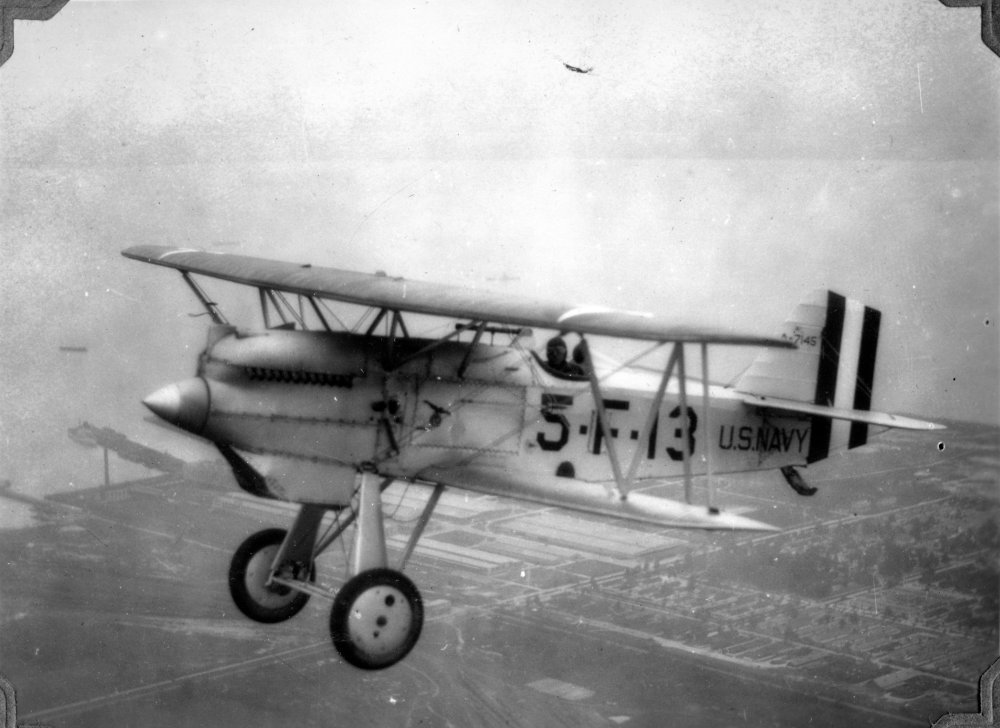
VF-5B F6C-1 date unknown

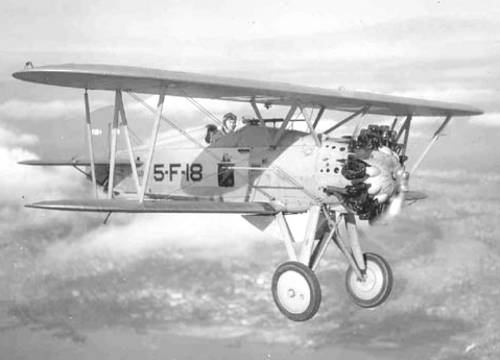
VF-5 F4B-1 date unknown

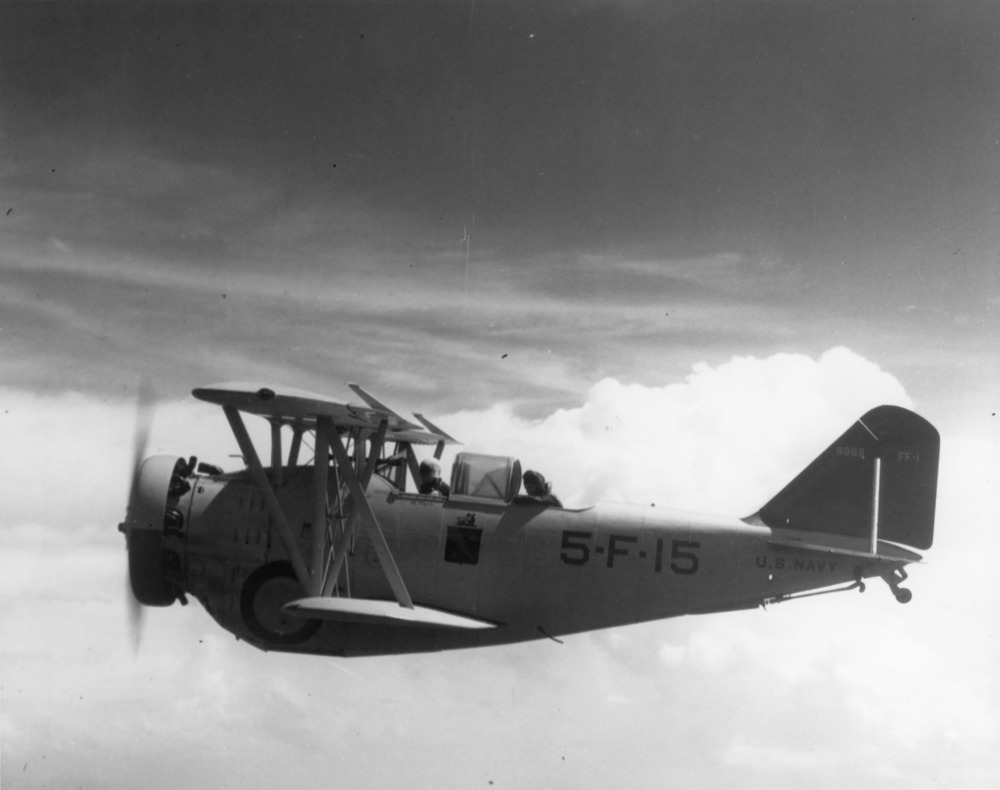
VF-5B FF-1 in 1936

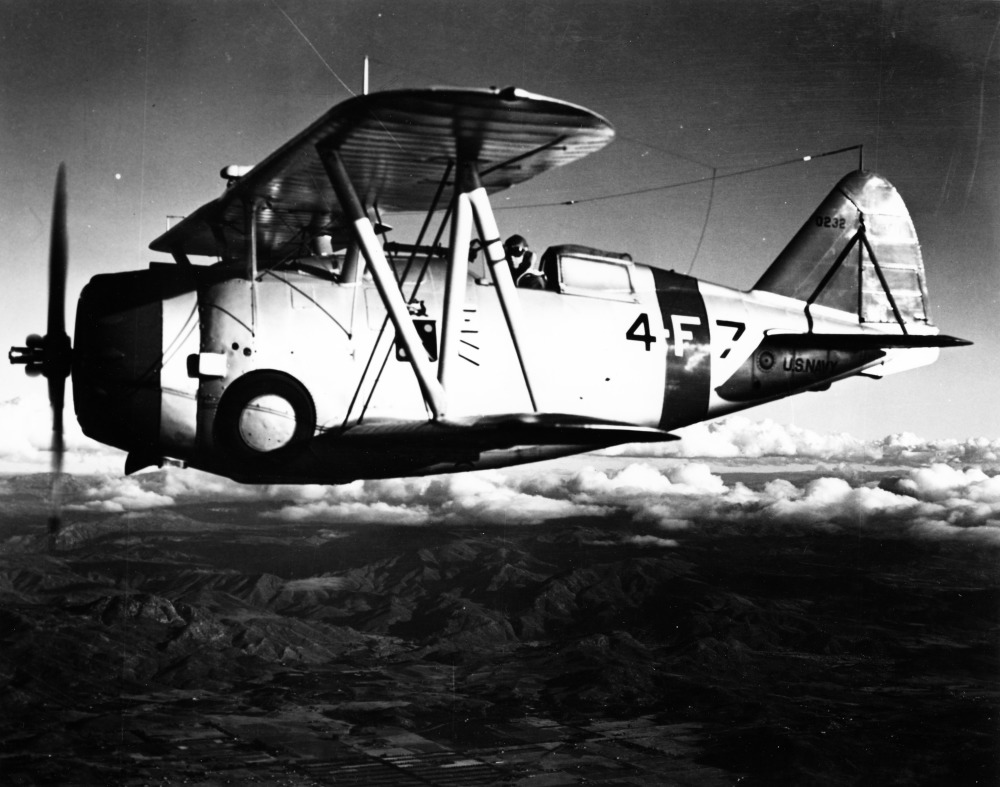
VF-4 F3F-1 in 1939

VF-5 was established on 1 February 1927 at Hampton Roads, Virginia flying the Curtis F6C-3 Hawk. From 1927 to World War II, the squadron flew various aircraft including the Boeing F3B-1 and F4B-1, the Grumman FF-1 and F3F-1 and also held the following designations (designations tended to change based on the mission; e.g., "S" for scout, "B" for bomber): VF-5S, VF-5B, VB-1B, and VF-4.

=== 1940s ===
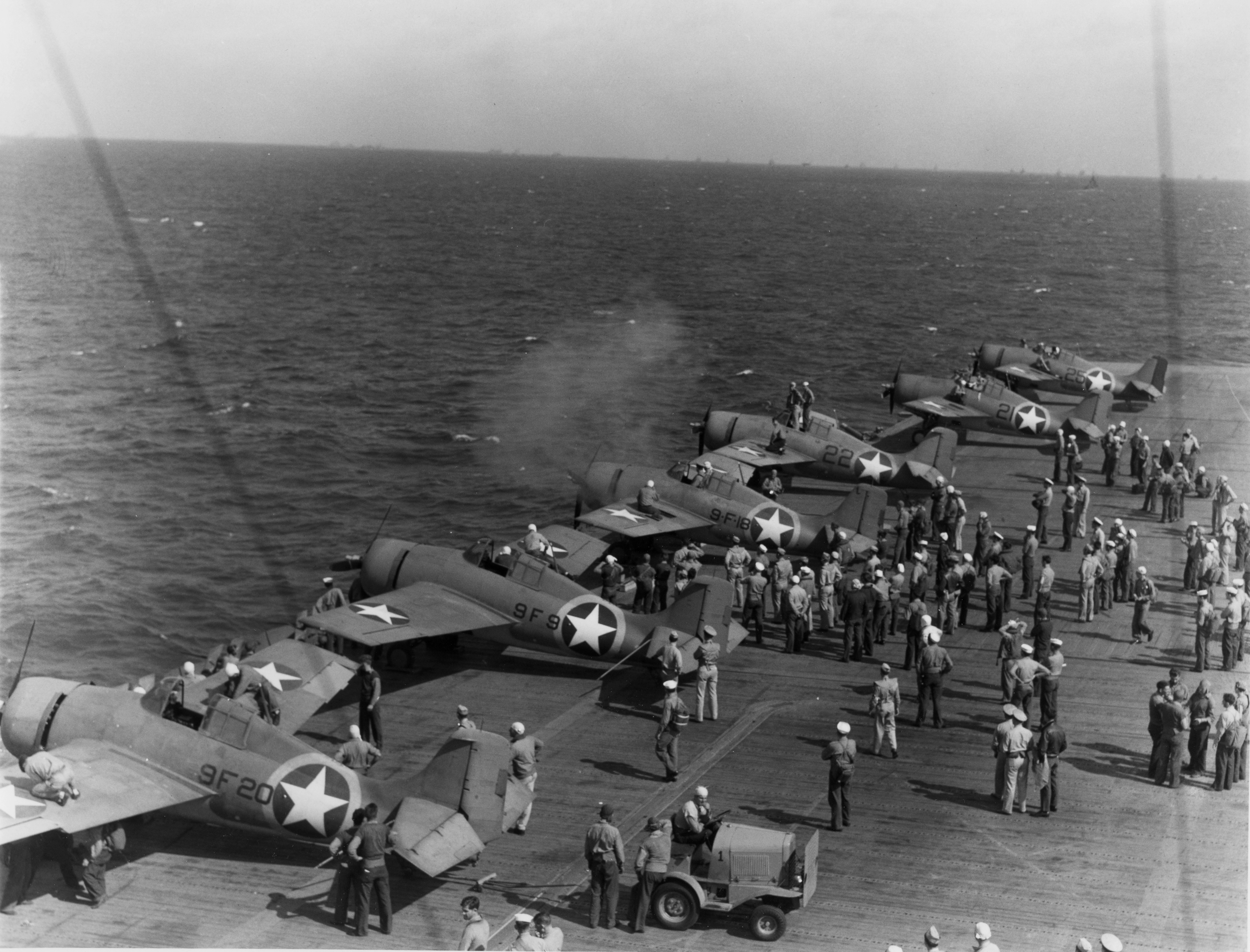
VF-41 F4F-4s testing their guns on USS Ranger prior to Operation Torch in November 1942

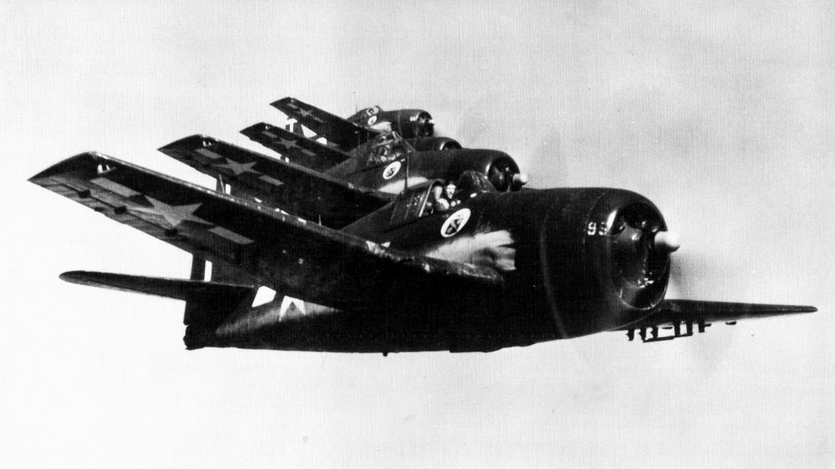
VF-4 F6Fs c.1945

During World War II, VF-41 deployed on USS Ranger supported the Allied invasion of Northwest Africa, downing 14 Vichy French aircraft in the Grumman F4F-3 Wildcat on 8/9 November 1942. The squadron lost 7 F4Fs in action over the same period. In October and November 1943 while operating from USS Ranger, VF-41 attacked targets in German-occupied Norway.

The squadron transferred to the Pacific Theatre. VF-4 deployed aboard USS Bunker Hill losing 5 F6Fs in operations off the Philippines in November 1944. VF-4 deployed aboard USS Essex and participated in the Battle of Mindoro, attacks on Japanese bases on Formosa and the Battle of Okinawa, losing 28 F6Fs between November 1944 and March 1945. For the fighter-bomber mission the Hellcat was fitted with wingroot pylons, each of which could carry a 1,000 -Ib bomb or a 'Tiny Tim' rocket. Smaller rockets were carried on three zero-length launchers on each wing.

VF-11 operating the F8F-1 Bearcat was assigned to Carrier Air Group One (CVG-1) embarked on USS Tarawa on a cruise from the U.S. West Coast to the U.S. East Coast from 1 October 1948 to 21 February 1949.

=== 1950s ===
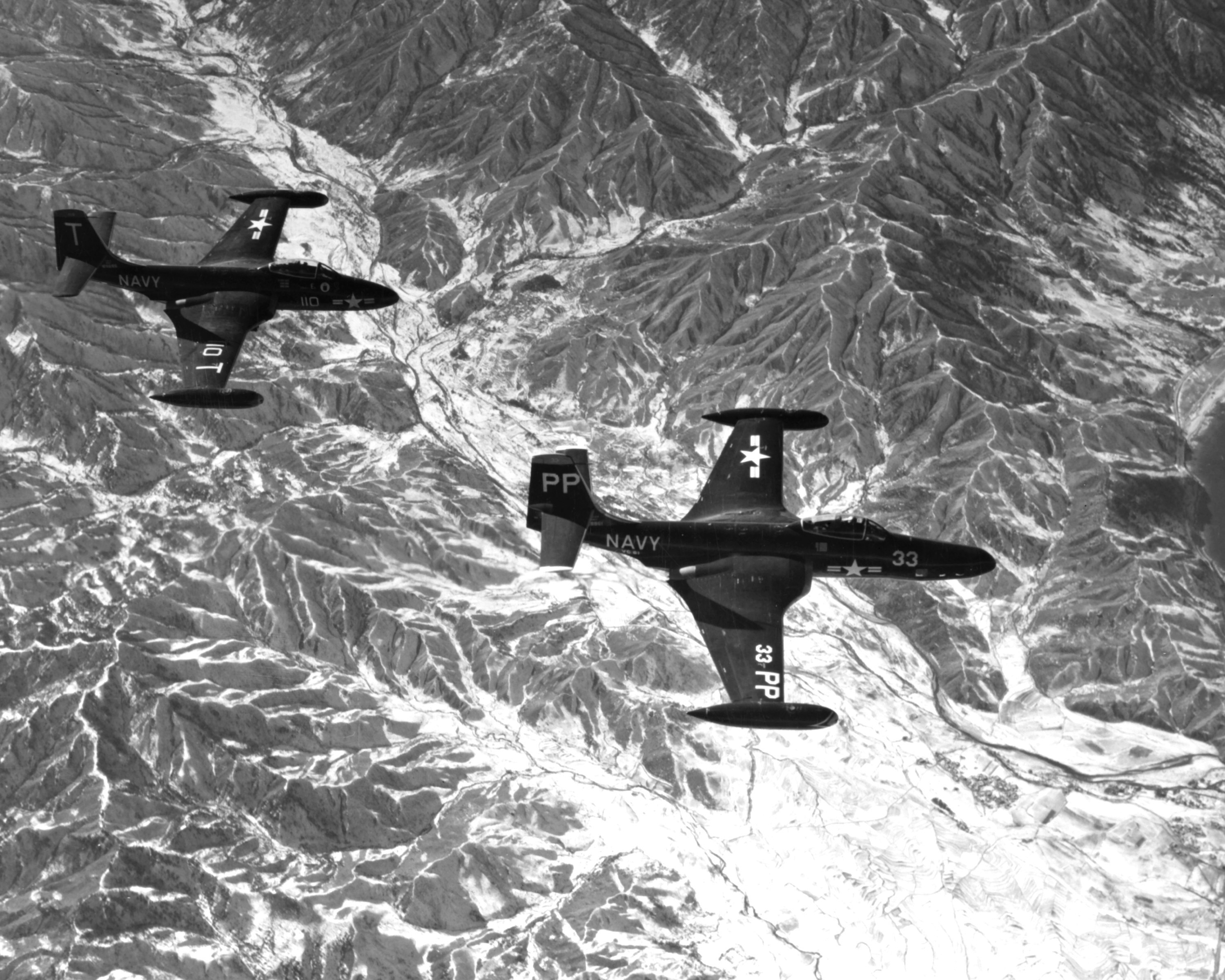
VF-11 F2H-2 escorts a VC-61 F2H-2P over Korea in 1953

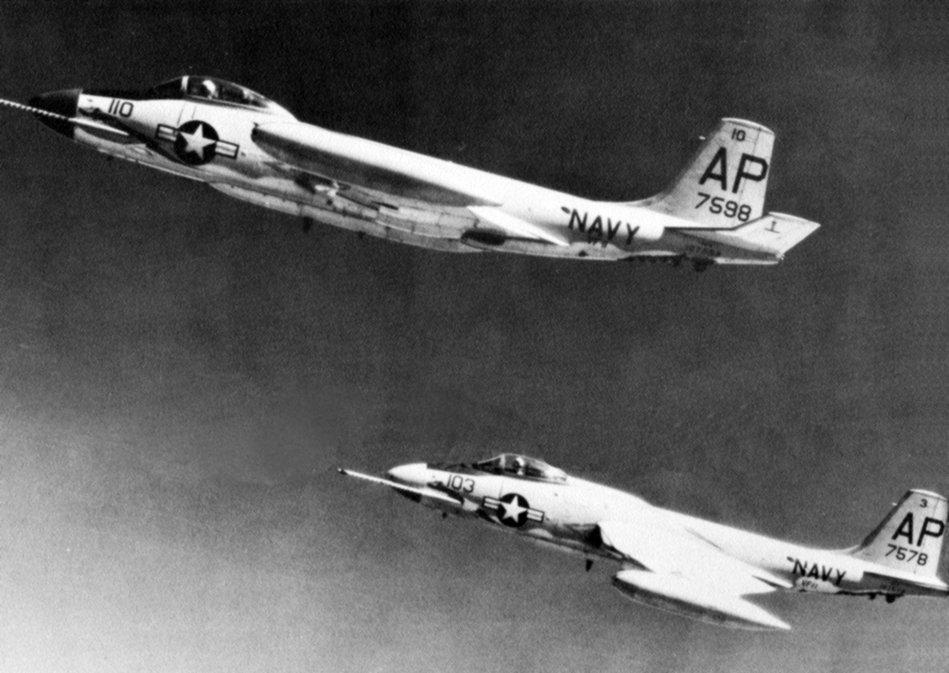
VF-11 F2H-4s in 1958

VF-11 flew the F2H-2 Banshee during the Korean War as part of Carrier Air Group 101 (CVG-101) deployed on USS Kearsarge from 11 August 1952 to 17 March 1953. During this deployment VF-11 lost 2 F2H-2s and their pilots to enemy fire.

VF-11 was assigned to Carrier Air Group 10 (CVG-10) aboard USS Coral Sea for a Mediterranean from 13 August 1956 to 11 February 1957.

VF-11 operating the F2H-4 was assigned to Air Task Group 201 (ATG-201) aboard USS Essex for a deployment to the Mediterranean, the Indian Ocean and the Western Pacific from 2 February to 17 November 1958. In the Mediterranean, USS Essex supported the US Marines landed in Lebanon.

In 1959, VF-11 moved to NAS Jacksonville and was disestablished on 15 February 1959, their men and equipment being distributed to other squadrons and activities. The 3rd VF-11, redesignated from VF-43 on 16 February 1959 adopted the insignia and nickname of the disestablished second VF-11.

== Home port assignments ==
- Hampton Roads
- NAS Jacksonville

== Aircraft assignment ==
- F6C-3 Hawk
- F3B-1
- F4B-1
- FF-1
- F3F-1
- F4F-3 Wildcat
- F6F Hellcat
- F8F Bearcat
- F2H-2/4 Banshee
- F3D-2 Skynight

== See also ==
- VFA-11
- History of the United States Navy
- List of inactive United States Navy aircraft squadrons
- List of United States Navy aircraft squadrons
