= Boeing P-12 =

US military fighter aircraft in service 1930-1941

P-12 / F4B
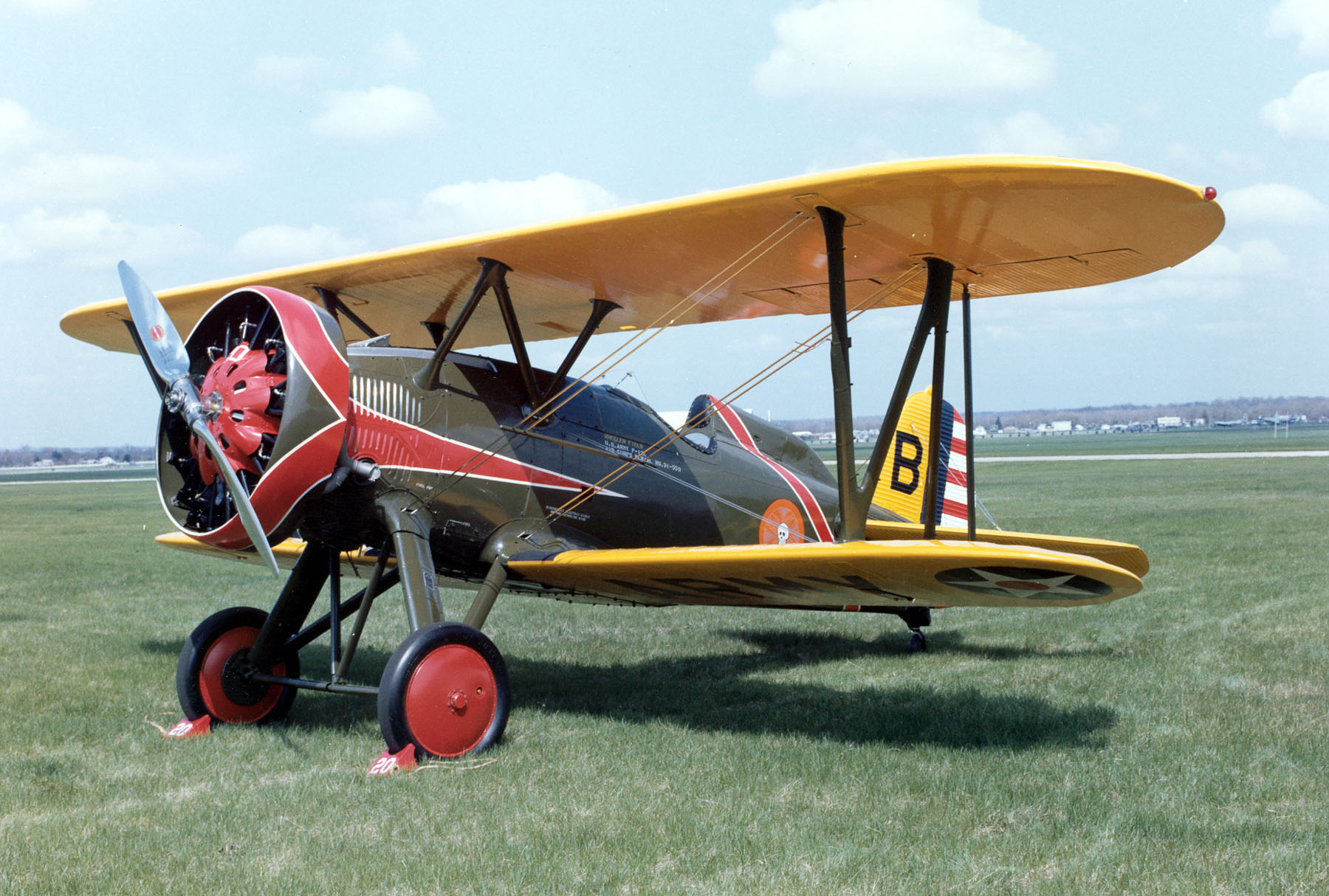
- Boeing P-12E at the National Museum of the United States Air Force, in markings of 6th Pursuit Squadron, 18th PG, Wheeler Field, Hawaii

General information
- Type: Fighter aircraft
- Manufacturer: Boeing Aircraft Company
- Primary users: United States Army Air Corps United States Navy; Philippine Army Air Corps; Royal Thai Air Force
- Number built: 586: 366 P-12; 187 F4B; 33 demonstrators and exports

History
- Manufactured: 1929–1932
- Introduction date: 1930
- First flight: 25 June 1928
- Retired: 1949 (Brazilian Air Force)

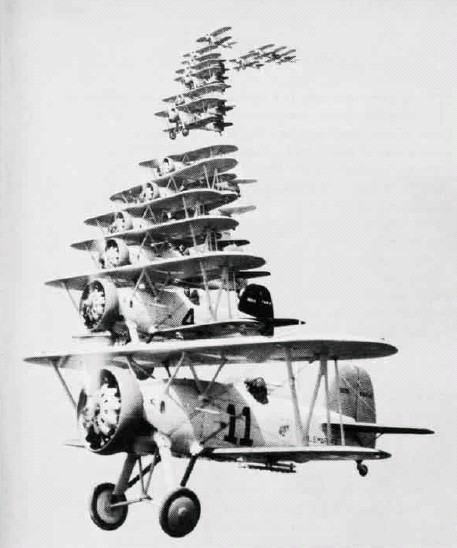
Formation of F4B-4 in the 1930s

The Boeing P-12 or Boeing F4B is an American fighter aircraft that was operated by the United States Army Air Corps, United States Marine Corps, and United States Navy. It was the chief fighter aircraft in American service during the early 1930s but also used internationally. By the late 1930s it was replaced in front-line duty by newer designs, but it was still used for training into the early 1940s. Many variants of the aircraft were developed. In the 21st century a handful of surviving air frames are on display in museums.

== Design and development ==
Developed as a private venture to replace the Boeing F2B and F3B with the United States Navy, the Boeing Model 99 first flew on 25 June 1928. The new aircraft was smaller, lighter and more agile than the ones it replaced but still used the Wasp engine of the F3B. This resulted in a higher top speed and overall better performance. As result of Navy evaluation 27 were ordered as the F4B-1; later evaluation by the United States Army Air Corps resulted in orders with the designation P-12. Boeing supplied the USAAC with 366 P-12s between 1929 and 1932. Production of all variants totaled 586.

F4B-1 (Boeing Model 99)

The F4B-1 was built using typical construction techniques of the day with a welded truss fuselage with formers and longerons to define the aerodynamic shape. Wings were of wood construction and covered by fabric. Ailerons were tapered, with corrugated aluminum covering. The Pratt & Whitney R-1340 nine-cylinder radial engine was uncowled and sported prominent cooling fairings behind each cylinder which were later removed in service.

F4B-2 (Boeing Model 223)

The F4B-2 was similar to the F4B-1 but incorporated a Townend ring cowling around the engine. The prominent cooling fairings behind each cylinder were not incorporated on this model. A spreader bar was incorporated between the landing wheels and the tail skid was replaced by a castoring tailwheel. Finally, the tapered ailerons were replaced by constant chord Frise ailerons. A total of 46 production F4B-2s were built. Bureau numbers included A-6813 through A8639 and A-8791 through A-8809. Some F4B-2s received F4B-4 style vertical fins and rudders to address poor directional stability.

F4B-3 (Boeing Model 235)

The F4B-3 represented a significant departure in design from the earlier versions of the F4B. While the F4B-1 and F4B-2 had fuselages constructed of welded steel tube truss, the F4B-3 used a combination of welded truss and semi-monocoque construction. From the engine mount aft to the rear of the fuel tank bay, the structure was welded steel truss, while the fuselage aft of the fuel tank bay was constructed of stressed skin, semi-monocoque aluminum alloy. Wings were constructed primarily of wood and covered in fabric. The F4B-3 was powered by a single-row, nine-cylinder Pratt & Whitney R-1340-D engine generating 500 hp. It had an internal supercharger and turned a 9 ft. two-blade Hamilton Standard propeller. The original configuration of the F4B-3 has a headrest fairing similar to the P-12E, but most were retrofitted with a headrest fairing capable of storing a liferaft. This later headrest fairing design was carried over to the F4B-4.

F4B-4 (Boeing Model 235)

The F4B-4 was nearly identical to the F4B-3, but incorporated a larger vertical fin to address the directional stability issues that plagued the F4B from its inception. The design was so similar to the F4B-3 that both aircraft had the same Boeing Model Number (235). The first nine aircraft (A-8912-8920) featured the same carburetor induction scheme as the F4B-3, but all following aircraft (A-8009-A-9053, 9226-9263 and 9719) featured a single oval carburetor intake on the port side only.

F4B-5 (Boeing Model 261)

A detailed specification was written for an F4B-5 as a minor development of the F4B-4 but was not proceeded with.

== Operational history ==
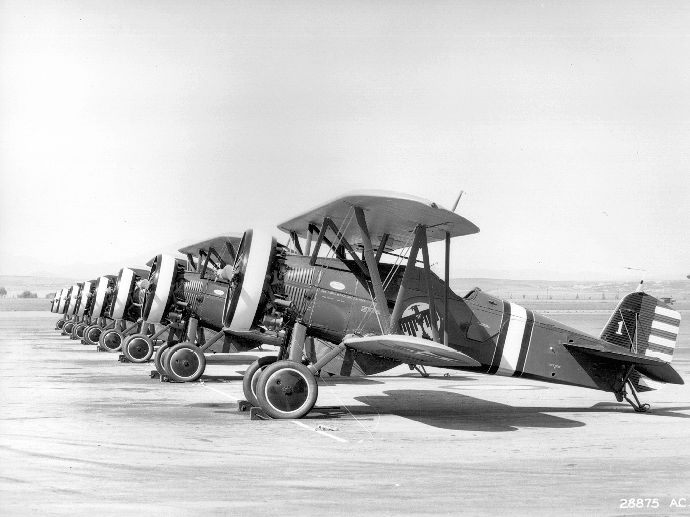
Row of Army Air Corps P-12s in 1932, of the 17th Pursuit Squadron

U.S. Army Air Corps

P-12s were flown by the 17th Pursuit Group (34th, 73rd, and 95th Pursuit Squadrons) at March Field, California, and the 20th Pursuit Group (55th, 77th and 79th Pursuit Squadrons) at Barksdale Field, Louisiana. Older P-12s were used by groups overseas: the 4th Composite Group (3rd Pursuit Squadron) in the Philippines, the 16th Pursuit Group (24th, 29th, 74th, and 79th Pursuit Squadrons) in the Canal Zone, and the 18th Pursuit Group (6th and 19th Pursuit Squadrons) in Hawaii.

The P-12 remained in service with first-line pursuit groups until replaced by Boeing P-26s in 1934–1935. Survivors were relegated to training duties until 1941, when most were grounded and assigned to mechanic's schools. 23 P-12Cs, P-12Ds and P-12Es were transferred to the Navy for use as advanced trainers. Bureau numbers were 2489 through 2511. These aircraft were redesignated as F4B-4As.

U.S. Marine Corps

F4Bs were flown by two Marine squadrons. VF-10M flew F4B-4s from February to July 1933. In June 1933, the squadron mission changed from Fighting to Bombing and was redesignated as VB-4M. By direction of MAJ Roy S. Gieger, Officer-in-Charge of Marine Corps Aviation, all VF-10M F4B-4s on strength be transferred to VF-9M at Quantico. By September 1933, VB-4M had been re-equipped with 16 F4B-3s.

VF-9M based at Brown Field, Quantico flew F4B-4s, starting the transition in September 1932. In June 1933, VF-9M received all of the F4B-4s transferred from VF-10M. VF-9M flew their F4B-4s until 1938 when they were replaced by Grumman F3F-2s.

A single F4B-3 (BuNo) 8911 was assigned to Headquarters, U.S. Marine Corps and was the personal aircraft of Col. Ross “Rusty” Rowell, Director of Marine Corps Aviation.

=== Production history ===
The production runs are shown below with the P-12 designations for Army aircraft and the F4B designations being for the Navy. The remaining aircraft are civilian or export.

Number built	Model	Engine	Modifications
9	P-12	R-1340-7	
90	P-12B	R-1340-9	NACA cowl, shorter landing gear, larger wheels
96	P-12C		ring cowl, spreader-bar landing gear
35	P-12D	R-1340-17	
110	P-12E		semi-monocoque metal fuselage, redesigned vertical tail, some with tailwheels replacing skids
25	P-12F	R-1340-19	
27	F4B-1		split axle landing gear, ventral bomb rack
46	F4B-2		spreader bar landing gear, frise ailerons, tailwheel replacing skid
21	F4B-3		Boeing Model 235, semi-monocoque metal fuselage
92	F4B-4	R-1340-16	redesigned vertical tail, underwing racks (two 116 lb bombs), last 45 had mod. headrest w/life raft
5	100/100A		(civilian version of F4B-1)
14	256		(F4B-4, export to Brazil)
9	267		(F4B-3 fuselage/P-12E wings, export to Brazil)

== Variants ==
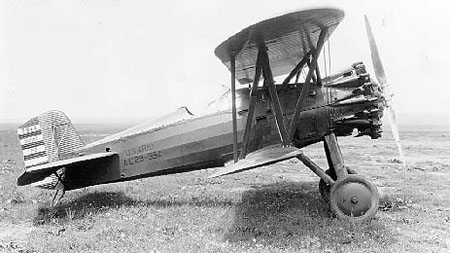
Boeing P-12

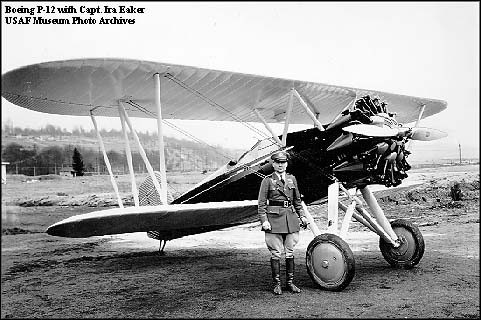
Boeing P-12 with Captain Ira Eaker

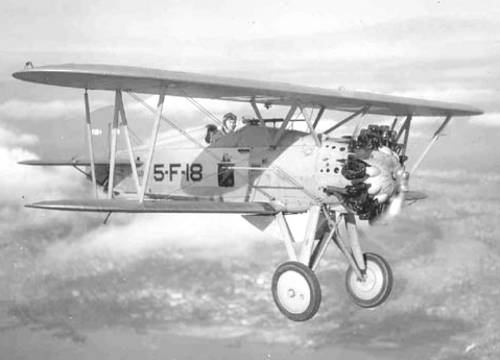
Boeing F4B-1 of VF-5 squadron

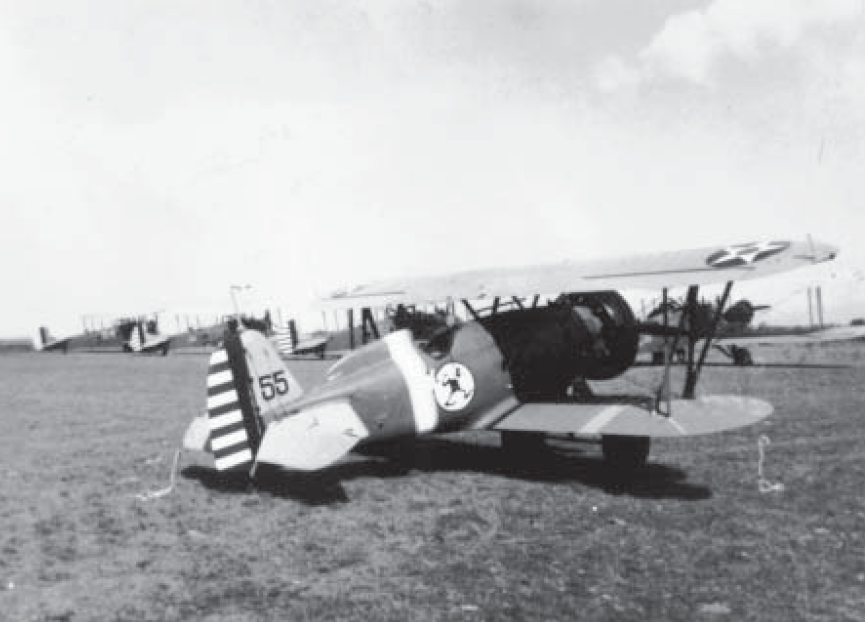
Boeing P-12E, trainer aircraft, 25th Bombardment Squadron, France Field, 1933

P-12
Model 102, U.S. Army Air Corps version of the F4B-1 with a 450 hp R-1340-7 engine; nine built.
XP-12A
Model 101, 10th built P-12 with NACA cowl, a 525 hp R-1340-9 engine, and a shorter undercarriage; one built.
P-12B
Model 102B, as P-12 with larger mainwheels and improvements tested on XP-12A; 90 built.
P-12C
Model 222, as P-12B with ring cowl and spreader-bar undercarriage; 96 built.
P-12D
Model 227, as P-12C with a 525 hp R-1340-17 engine; 35 built.
P-12E
Model 234, as P-12D with semi-monocoque metal fuselage, redesigned vertical tail surfaces, some were later fitted with tailwheels instead of skids; 110 built.
P-12F
Model 251, as P-12E with a 600 hp R-1340-19 engine; 25 built.
XP-12G
P-12B modified with a R-1340-15 engine with side-type supercharger; one converted.
XP-12H
P-12D modified with a GISR-1340E experimental engine; one converted.
P-12J
P-12E modified with a 575 hp R-1340-23 engine, and special bomb sight; one conversion.
YP-12K
P-12E and P-12J re-engined with a fuel injected SR-1340E engine; seven temporary conversions.
XP-12L
YP-12K temporary fitted with a F-2 supercharger; one converted.
A-5
designation for proposed use of P-12 as a radio-controlled target drone (cancelled)
XF4B-1
Designation given to two prototypes for Navy evaluation, the former Model 83 and the former Model 89.
F4B-1
Boeing Model 99 for the United States Navy, split-axle landing gear and ventral bomb rack; 27 built.
F4B-1A
One F4B-1 (BuNo A-8133) converted to unarmed executive transport for the Assistant Secretary of the Navy, fuel tank moved to upper wing centre section.
F4B-2
Boeing Model 223, spreader bar landing gear, frise ailerons, tailwheel replacing skid; 46 built.
F4B-3
Boeing Model 235, as F4B-2 but with semi-monocoque metal fuselage and equipment changes; 21 built.
F4B-4
Boeing Model 235, as F4B-3 but with redesigned vertical tail surfaces, 550 hp R-1340-16 engine, underwing racks for two 116 lb bombs, last 45 built had an enlarged headrest housing a life raft; 92 built and one built from spares.
F4B-4A
23 assorted P-12 aircraft transferred from USAAC for use as trainers. Later modified as part of Project FOX, for use as radio-controlled target aircraft.
Model 83
One prototype with spreader-bar landing gear and 425 hp Pratt & Whitney R-1340-8 engine, later designated XF4B-1 for Navy evaluation.
Model 89
One prototype with split-axle undercarriage and provision for a 500 lb bomb on ventral rack, later designated XF4B-1 for Navy evaluation.
Model 91
As Model 83 except with metal frame wings.
Model 100
Civil version of the F4B-1 with upper wing tank, four built.

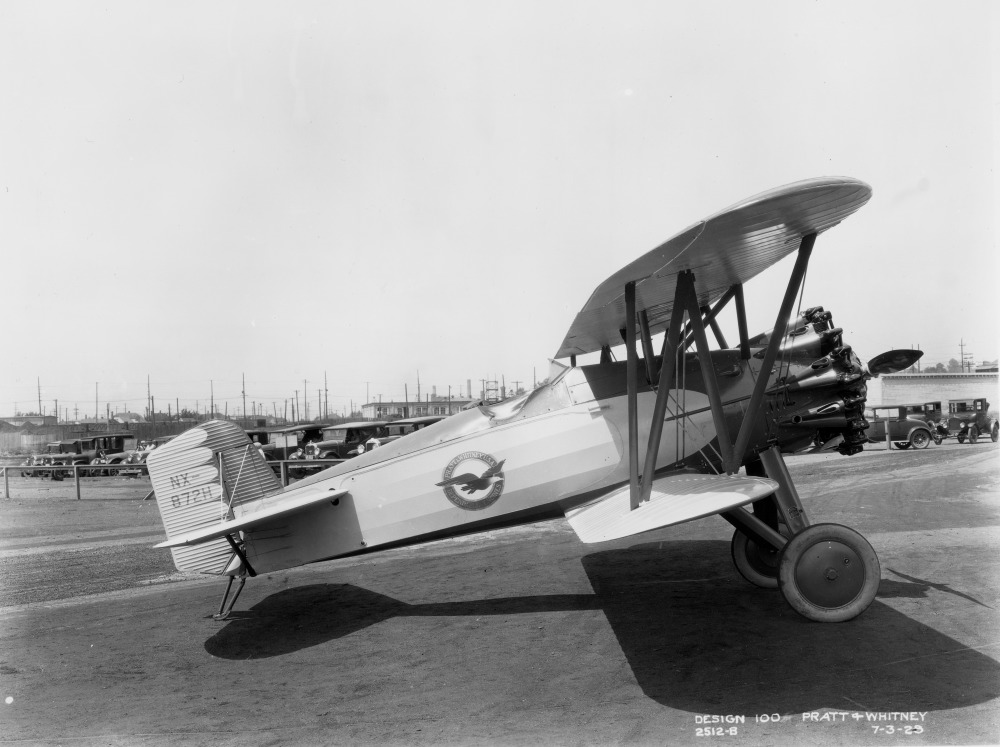
Boeing 100 NX872H

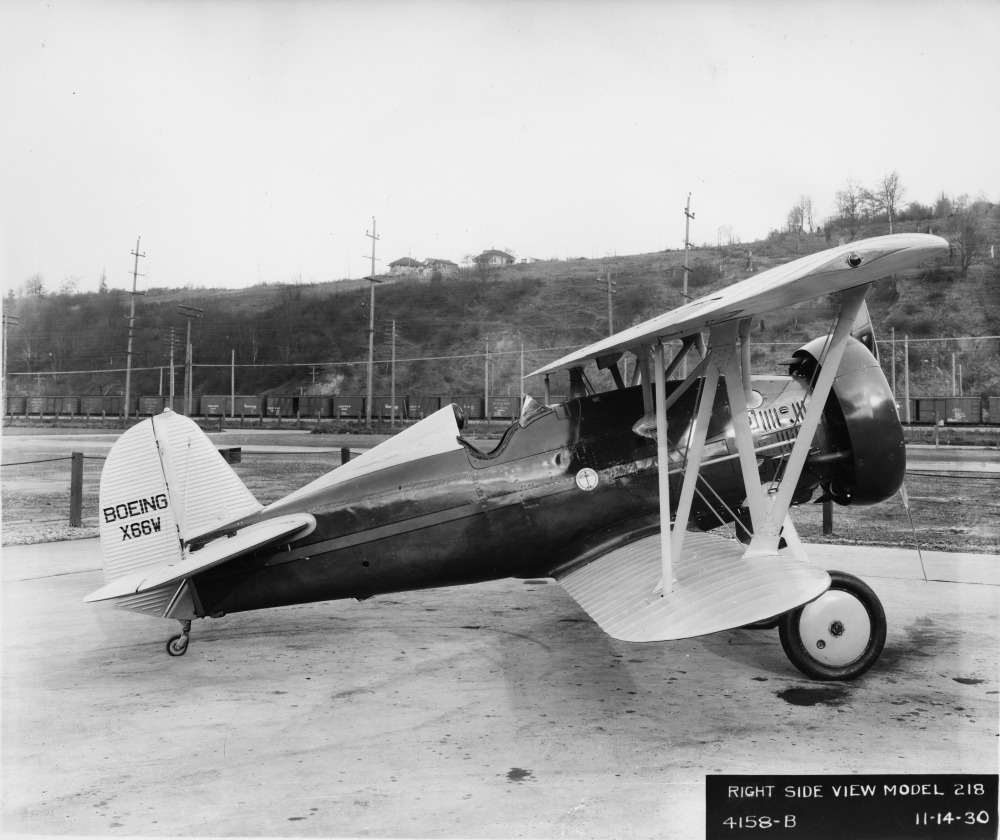
Boeing 218

Model 100A
Two-seat civil version for Howard Hughes, later converted to a single-seater; one built.
Model 100D
One Model 100 temporary used as a P-12 demonstrator.
Model 100E
Export version of the P-12E for the Siamese Air Force under the designation B.Kh.7 (Thai: บ.ข.๗), two built, one later transferred to the Japanese Navy under the designation AXB.
Model 100F
One civil variant of the P-12F sold to Pratt & Whitney as an engine test bed.
Model 218
Prototype of the P-12E/F4B-3 variant, after evaluation sold to the Chinese Air Force.
Model 256
Export version of the F4B-4 for Brazilian Navy, 14 built. Locally designated C1B.
Model 267
Export version for Brazil with an F4B-3 fuselage and P-12E wings; nine built.
Model 303
P-12E with a more powerful engine and brazier head rivets in body; a version with wing tanks was known as the 303A.
Model 304
As Model 303 but with the fabric covered steel tube fuselage of the P-12C; the version with wing tanks was known as the 304A.

== Operators ==
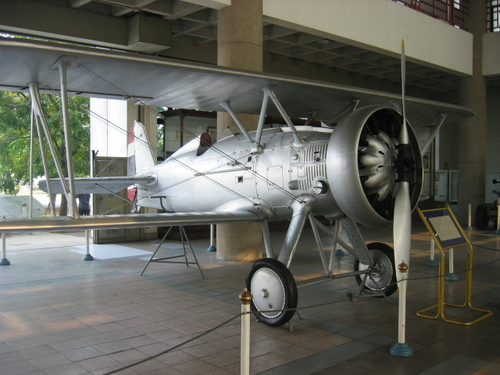
Boeing 100E at the Royal Thai Air Force Museum

Brazil

- Brazilian Air Force

China

- Chinese Nationalist Air Force

Philippines

- Philippine Army Air Corps

Spain

- Spanish Air Force

Thailand

- Royal Thai Air Force operated Boeing 100E variant.

United States

- United States Army Air Corps
- United States Navy
- United States Marine Corps

== Aircraft on display ==
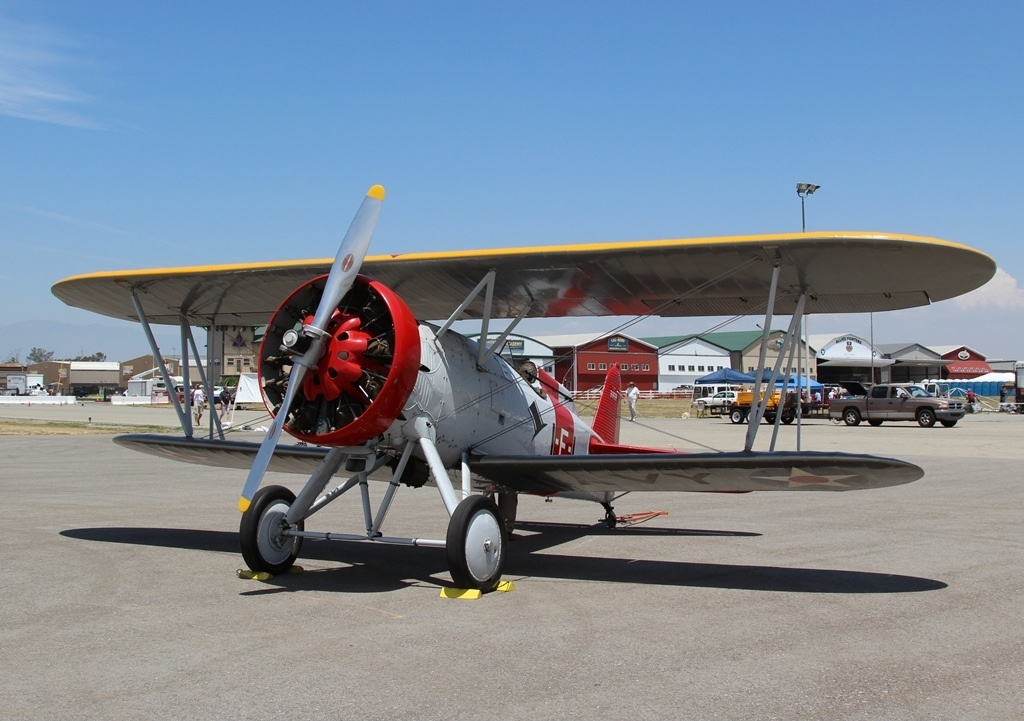
P-12E at Planes of Fame, USA

- 31-559 – P-12E on display at the National Museum of the United States Air Force at Wright-Patterson AFB near Dayton, Ohio.
- 32-017 – P-12E on display at the Planes of Fame Air Museum in Chino, California. This airframe is painted as an F4B-3.
- 32-092 – P-12F on display at the National Naval Aviation Museum in Pensacola, Florida. This airframe is restored to look like an F4B-4 and painted with the markings of Fighting Squadron 6B "Felix the Cat".
- 9241 – F4B-4 on display in the "Sea-Air Operations" Gallery at the National Air and Space Museum in Washington, D.C. (Currently in storage due to ongoing renovations at the museum).
- 1143 – Model 100 on display at the Museum of Flight in Seattle, Washington.
- 1488 – Model 100E on display at the Royal Thai Air Force Museum in Bangkok.
- Replica – A 3/4 scale replica P-12F is on display at the Tennessee Museum of Aviation in Sevierville, Tennessee.
- Replica – A 3/4 scale replica F4B-4 is on display in the entrance hall of the Honolulu International Airport. Originally built by and displayed at the San Diego Air and Space Museum.

== Specifications (P-12E) ==
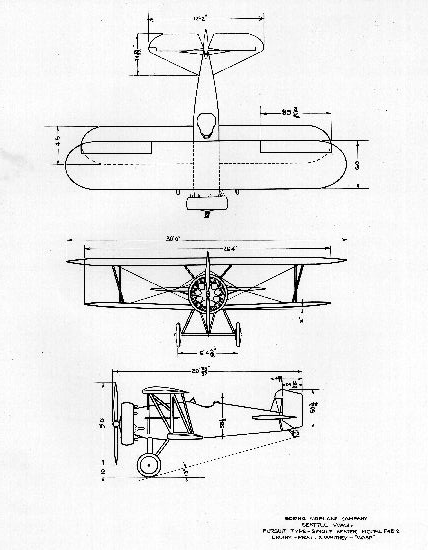
F4B-2 3-view drawing

Data from

General characteristics

- Crew: 1
- Length: 20 ft 4 in (6.20 m)
- Wingspan: 30 ft (9.1 m)
- Height: 9 ft (2.7 m)
- Airfoil: Boeing 106
- Gross weight: 2,690 lb (1,220 kg)
- Powerplant: 1 × Pratt & Whitney R-1340-17 Wasp 9-cylinder air-cooled radial piston engine, 500 hp (370 kW)
- Propellers: 2-bladed adjustable-pitch metal propeller

Performance

- Maximum speed: 189 mph (304 km/h, 164 kn)
- Cruise speed: 160 mph (260 km/h, 140 kn)
- Range: 570 mi (920 km, 500 nmi)
- Service ceiling: 26,300 ft (8,000 m)

Armament

- Guns: 2 x .30 inch (7.62 mm) Browning machine guns with 600 rounds per gun or 1 x .30 inch (7.62 mm) machine gun with 600 rounds and 1 x .50 inch (12.7 mm) machine gun with 200 rounds
- Bombs: 244 lb (111 kg) of bombs carried externally.

== See also ==
Related lists

- List of military aircraft of the United States
- List of fighter aircraft
