= Denmark's role in Operation Prosperity Guardian =

Danish naval deployment as part of a US-led maritime security mission in the Red Sea

Denmark's involvement in Operation Prosperity Guardian
- Part of Operation Prosperity Guardian
Date	29 January 2024 – 4 April 2024
Location	Red Sea, Gulf of Aden, Yemen
Result	Mission completed; political fallout in Denmark

Commanders and leaders
- Commander Sune Lund

Units involved
- HDMS Iver Huitfeldt (F361)

Casualties and losses
- None
- Deployment ended April 2024; internal investigations ongoing

Denmark's role in Operation Prosperity Guardian refers to its military contribution to the United States-led multinational naval mission, called Operation Prosperity Guardian, launched in December 2023 to safeguard commercial shipping routes in the Red Sea and Gulf of Aden. The operation was initiated in response to escalating Houthi attacks on civilian and military ships, which disrupted the global trade routes. Denmark deployed the frigate HDMS Iver Huitfeldt and personnel to the headquarters of the operation, with a mandate to use force in defense of freedom of navigation and allied assets. During its deployment, the frigate responded to multiple aerial threats but experienced critical failures across all layers of its air defense system. This incident led to political fallout in Denmark, including the dismissal of the Chief of Defense, and triggered multiple investigations into military readiness.

== Military contribution ==
Denmark's participation in Operation Prosperity Guardian included the deployment of a frigate, intelligence support, and strategic coordination with international allies. The Royal Danish Navy contributed the frigate HDMS Iver Huitfeldt (F361), which is equipped with radar systems, air defense capabilities, and carries a Seahawk helicopter. The frigate carried a crew of up to 175 personnel and was scheduled to operate in the Red Sea and Gulf of Aden from early February to mid-April 2024. HDMS Iver Huitfeldt operated under Combined Task Force 153 (CTF153), with the objective of enhancing maritime security and protecting civilian vessels in international waters, including countering hijacking attempts.

The Danish contribution had a mandate to use force to counter threats against the freedom of navigation. The Danish forces were authorized to use force in self-defense and to protect civilian ships and allied units participating in Operation Prosperity Guardian, as well as those operating under other mandates such as EMASoH, the EU's Operation Atalanta, or national deployments. Their designated area of operations included the Red Sea, the Bab el-Mandeb Strait, the Gulf of Aden, and nearby regions. As part of the Combined Maritime Forces (CMF), Danish units could also operate in the Arabian Sea and Persian Gulf, where CMF headquarters are located.

Cyber capabilities were also included in the Danish contribution. These assets could be used independently or alongside other Danish operations and remained active from the adoption of the parliamentary mandate until six months after the frigate's return.

== Deployment timeline ==
On 24 January 2024, the Danish Parliament (Folketinget) passed Resolution B104, authorizing Denmark's participation in Operation Prosperity Guardian with the deployment of a staff officer. Shortly after the decision, on 29 December 2023, the Danish government announced an additional contribution with a Royal Danish Navy frigate.

The frigate HDMS Iver Huitfeldt departed from Korsør on 29 January 2024, setting course for the Mediterranean Sea. The final decision to deploy the ship to the operational area was made after parliamentary approval on 6 February 2024.

Once operational, Iver Huitfeldt joined Combined Task Force 153 (CTF153), a multinational naval task force tasked with protecting maritime traffic in the Red Sea and surrounding regions. The ship's mission was scheduled to last until mid-April 2024.

During its deployment in the Red Sea, HDMS Iver Huitfeldt engaged in active defense against aerial threats. On the night of 9 March 2024, the frigate intercepted and shot down four drones launched by Houthi forces, who were targeting commercial vessels in the southern Red Sea. According to Danish defense reports, the drone attack involved at least 15 aerial threats.

While the Danish frigate successfully neutralized four of them, a later internal report revealed that all layers of the ship's air defense systems failed at different times during the engagement. Following the incident, Iver Huitfeldt was ordered to relocate to a less volatile area of the Red Sea due to continued security threats. On 4 April 2024, Iver Huitfeldt returned to Korsør, Denmark.

== Operational failures and political response ==
On the night of 9 March 2024, the Danish frigate HDMS Iver Huitfeldt engaged and shot down four drones launched by Houthi forces in the Red Sea. While initially presented as a successful defense operation, this assessment was challenged after the Danish defense media outlet Olfi published details from a leaked internal report on 2 April 2024.

The report revealed that the frigate experienced multiple technical failures during the engagement. The ship's primary air defense system was non-operational for approximately 30 minutes, preventing the launch of its Sea Sparrow missiles. As a result, the crew had to rely on the ship's cannons. However, around half of the rounds reportedly detonated prematurely, failing to hit their targets. According to the ship's commander, the high number of defective rounds led to excessive ammunition consumption, which could have posed a significant risk had the attack involved more drones or missile threats.

The leak caused a public and political backlash. On 3 April 2024, Chief of Defense Flemming Lentfer was dismissed by Defense Minister Troels Lund Poulsen, who stated that he no longer had confidence in Lentfer's leadership. The decision followed criticism of the Danish Defence Command for not informing the ministry of the severity of the incident.

== Pre-deployment concerns ==
Prior to the mission, Danish military officials had assured the government that Iver Huitfeldt was fully combat-ready. However, an internal assessment on 26 January 2024, by Commander Sune Lund indicated that the ship's operational readiness was at 95%, while technical readiness was only at 90% due to an accelerated preparation process.

During a training exercise in the UK in December 2023, the crew experienced multiple issues with the ship's control and weapons systems. These unresolved concerns raised further doubts about whether Iver Huitfeldt was fully mission-capable when it was deployed to the Red Sea on 29 January 2024.

== Aftermath ==
Following the drone engagement on 9 March 2024, three official investigations were launched into the technical failures aboard HDMS Iver Huitfeldt.

The first investigation, classified by the Danish Defense Command, was leaked to the defense media outlet Olfi and published on 2 April 2024. The leaked report contradicted initial government messaging by revealing that all layers of the frigate's air defense systems had failed at various points during the engagement. The findings suggested that the ship and crew had been at significantly greater risk than previously disclosed.

In response to the leak and growing public scrutiny, Defense Minister Troels Lund Poulsen ordered a second investigation, citing a lack of awareness of the full extent of the system failures. However, on 3 April 2024, Danish broadcaster TV 2 reported that the Ministry of Defense had, in fact, already been informed of the technical issues through a classified XSUM report. This briefing had been submitted on 15 March 2024, two days after the ship commander's initial report. According to TV 2's coverage, daily updates had been provided to the ministry throughout the mission, and a high-level meeting had been scheduled for 18 March to discuss the matter further.

That same day, 3 April 2024, Minister Poulsen dismissed Chief of Defense Flemming Lentfer, citing a loss of confidence. The minister subsequently tasked the Danish Defense Intelligence Service (FE) with investigating the leaks of classified information. Lentfer publicly stated that he was prepared to take legal action, arguing that there was no legitimate basis for his dismissal.

A third investigation, this time unclassified, was published on 25 April 2024. It confirmed that Iver Huitfeldt had successfully neutralized four drones launched by Houthi forces. However, it restated that all three layers of the ship's air defense systems had experienced critical failures:

- The primary air defense system, which launches Sea Sparrow missiles, was non-operational for 30 minutes during the battle.
- The 76mm cannon, the ship's secondary defense layer, malfunctioned in multiple instances. Many of the rounds exploded too close to the frigate rather than hitting their intended targets.
- The 35mm close-in weapon system, the final layer of defense, locked up when activated and only became operational again after the last drone had already been shot down.

Ship commander Sune Lund later stated that these failures could have had critical consequences if the attack had involved additional or more advanced threats, such as missiles. Following the engagement, the frigate was relocated to a less volatile area of the Red Sea due to ongoing security concerns. The Danish Defense Command concluded that had the attack included missiles alongside the drones, the risk to the ship and crew would have been significantly higher.

The Ministry of Defense was initially not provided with a detailed breakdown of the technical malfunctions. It was only after media coverage of the leaks that a full internal review was launched, ultimately contributing to the dismissal of the Chief of Defense.

Despite the system failures, Danish officials commended the ship's crew for their performance during the engagement, noting that no injuries or damage to the vessel occurred. Defense Minister Poulsen acknowledged the operational challenges but emphasized that the mission had been completed successfully. The Defense Command and Ministry continue to evaluate the implications of the incident for future naval deployments.

== See also ==
- Operation Prosperity Guardian
- Royal Danish Navy
