= Operation Prosperity Guardian =

International military operation to protect Red Sea shipping

- Part of the Red Sea crisis and the Yemeni civil war
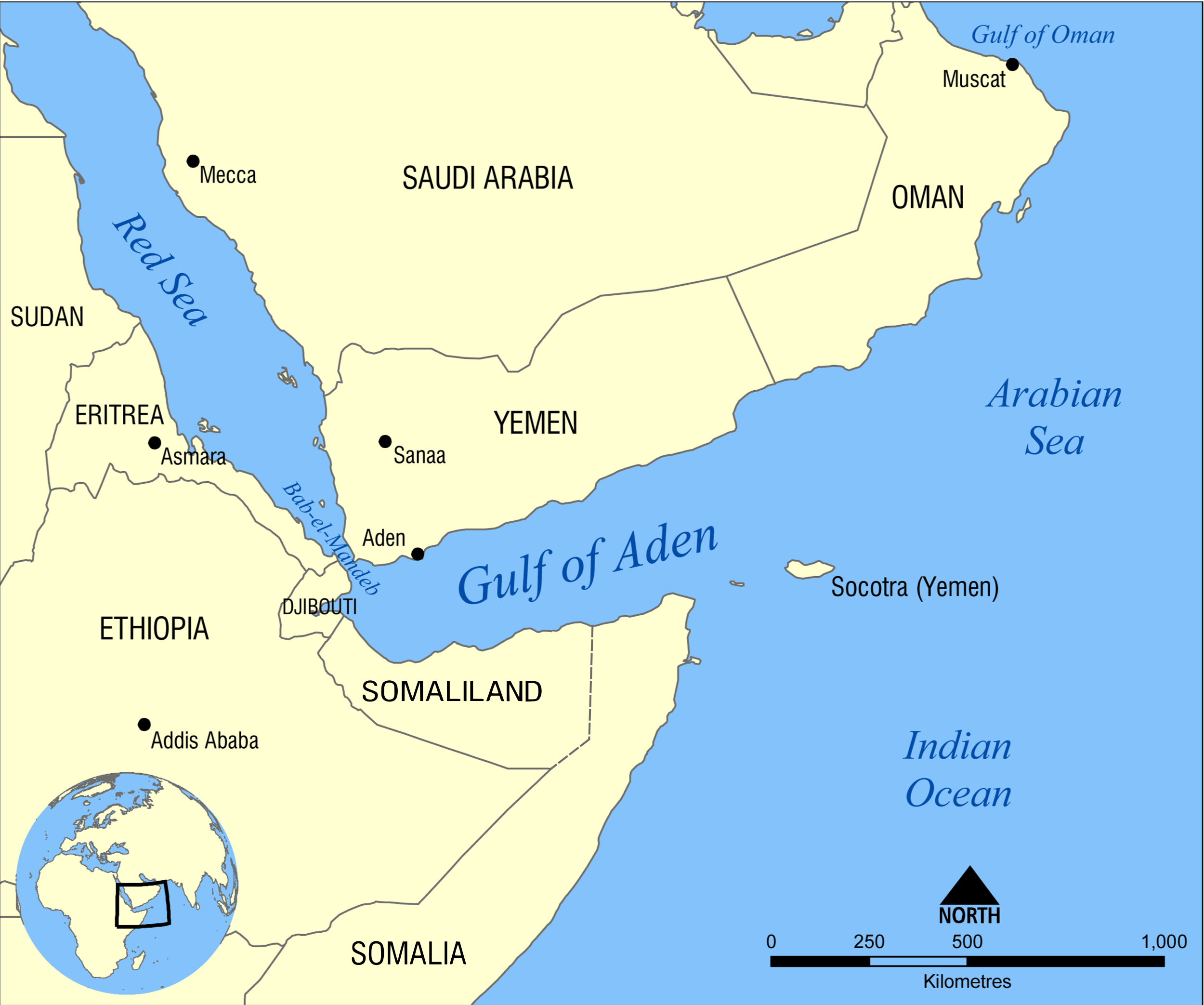
| Date | 18 December 2023 – 6 May 2025 (2 years, 10 months, 2 weeks and 4 days) |
| Location | Red Sea and Gulf of Aden |
| Status | Operational failure; Large number of U.S. and allied airstrikes against Houthi-controlled territory in Yemen; US-led Operation Poseidon Archer; US-led Operation Rough Rider; Israeli attacks in July 2024, September 2024, December 2024, January 2025 and May 2025; 2025 U.S.–Houthi ceasefire; Houthis agreed not to attack US vessels, but resumed attacks on the commercial shipping in the Red Sea; Houthis to continue targeting Israel and Israeli-linked vessels |

Belligerents
| United States; United Kingdom; Australia; Bahrain; Canada; Denmark; Finland; Greece; Netherlands; New Zealand; Norway; Singapore; Sri Lanka; Supported by: Seychelles | Houthis |

Commanders and leaders
| (United States) Donald Trump; (United States) Pete Hegseth; (United States) Joe Biden; (United States) Lloyd Austin; (United States) Brad Cooper; (United Kingdom) Keir Starmer; (United Kingdom) John Healey; (United Kingdom) Rishi Sunak; (United Kingdom) Grant Shapps | (Yemen) (Houthis) Mansour al-Saadi; (Yemen) (Houthis) Muhammad Fadl Abdulnabi |

Units involved
- See order of battle

Strength
| Unknown | (Yemen) Unclear (see Houthi armed strength) |

Casualties and losses
| 3 deaths (non-combat); 2 F-18 aircraft | 10 deaths, 2 injured |

Bab-el-Mandeb transits by cargo vessels
over 10,000 deadweight tonnage (approx.)

Before attacks

After first Houthi ship seizure/attack (19 November 2023)

After naval protection operation started (18 December 2023)

After US/UK attack on Yemen mainland (12 January 2024)

Operation Prosperity Guardian was a United States-led military operation by a multinational coalition formed in December 2023 to respond to Houthi-led attacks on shipping in the Red Sea.

Following the breakout of the Gaza war in October 2023, the Houthi movement in Yemen launched a series of attacks against commercial vessels in the Red Sea, including but not limited to those heading or related to Israel, with the stated purpose of preventing the bombing of Gaza and forcing Israel to let food and medicine into the strip. On 18 December 2023, U.S. Secretary of Defense Lloyd Austin announced the formation of an international maritime security force aimed at ending the blockade and countering threats by Houthi forces against international maritime commerce in the region.

The coalition had more than 20 members Egypt and Saudi Arabia, both economically reliant on unhindered commercial shipping in the area, are absent from the listed participants. France, Italy and Spain have also declined to participate. The chairman of the Suez Canal Authority, Usama Rabia, claimed that "navigation traffic in the Suez Canal was not affected by what is happening in the Red Sea". Nevertheless, on 10 January, the United Nations Security Council (UNSC) adopted a resolution demanding a cessation of Houthi attacks on merchant vessels.

The day of the UNSC resolution, the Houthis launched their largest-ever barrage of 18–24 attack drones and missiles at international ships and warships in the Red Sea. In response, on 12 January 2024, the coalition launched its first airstrikes against Houthi targets in Yemen, to which the Houthis have pledged to retaliate.

As of 2 January 2025, the Houthis recorded 931 American and British airstrikes against its sites in Yemen, resulting in 106 deaths and 314 injuries. Since 15 March 2025, attacks in Yemen have intensified during Operation Rough Rider and the United States have conducted over 1,000 airstrikes.

On 6 May 2025, President Donald Trump announced that the Houthis had "capitulated" and promised not to attack commercial vessels passing Red Sea and Gulf of Aden. He further declared the US strikes to be over, "effective immediately," as a result of a ceasefire between the U.S. and the Houthis, brokered by Oman.

The Houthis agreed to halt attacks on US vessels in the Red Sea but emphasized that the ceasefire did not in "any way, shape, or form" apply to Israel. While Trump framed the truce as the Houthis having "capitulated" and not "want[ing] to fight anymore," while also having shown "a lot of bravery," the Houthis stated that it was in fact the U.S. that "backed down." Administration officials interviewed by The New York Times said that Trump agreed to the cease fire because the airstrikes were not achieving their objectives and the United States failed to achieve air superiority against the Houthis.

After the ceasefire was implemented, attacks on commercial shipping resumed. Operation Aspides a "purely defensive" EU military operation has continued to provide limited protection to shipping.

== Background ==
The operation aims to ensure both the freedom of navigation and the safety of maritime traffic in the Red Sea, Bab al-Mandeb and Gulf of Aden. Following the start of the Gaza war, multiple civilian container and freight ships were attacked and hijacked in the Gulf of Aden by Houthi forces. Houthi forces stated that only vessels with links to Israel are targeted, though vessels without links to Israel have been targeted, possibly due to misidentification from many vessels turning off their automatic identification system signal during transit. The Houthis claim the attacks will end if Israel allows humanitarian supplies to enter Gaza; the attempted blockade is seen as a way to pressure Israel's Western allies to work to restrain Israeli operations in the war. As of 1 January 2024, at least seventeen civilian vessels have been attacked.

The waterways to and from the Red Sea are shipping chokepoints for the global economy which connects the Mediterranean Sea with the Indian Ocean and the Suez Canal with the Horn of Africa. This had led to the 2023 situation being dubbed "a new Suez Crisis" by The Economist.

A considerable number of freighters have continued to transit, with mostly large container ships diverting away rather than other shipping, with the strait continuing to be heavily used by bulk carriers and tankers which are under different contract arrangements and often from countries supportive of Gaza's situation so perceiving a minimal risk from ongoing Houthi attacks. In the first week of January 2024 the average number of freighters active each day in the Red Sea included 105 bulk carriers and 58 tankers, down from 115 bulk carriers and 70 tankers the week before. In contrast, six of the ten largest container shipping companies were largely avoiding the Red Sea, with relatively few container ships transiting the Bab al-Mandeb strait from 18 December 2023.

== Forces ==
For most of the campaign, the US Navy assigned two carrier strike groups, equating at least five ships each, and 7,000 personnel in the Red Sea for the operation.

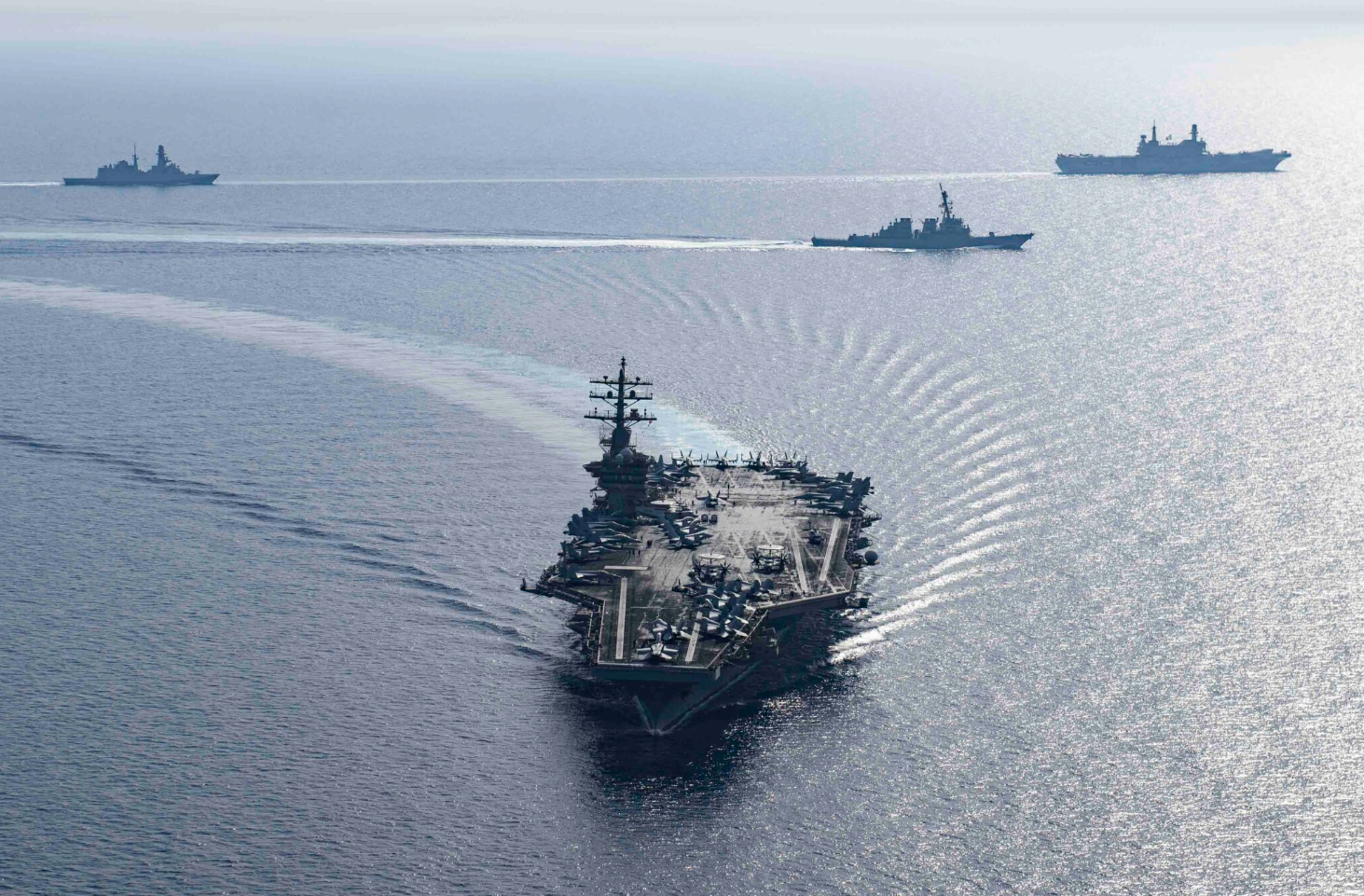
Aircraft carrier USS Dwight D. Eisenhower with destroyer USS Laboon involved in Operation Prosperity Guardian together with French frigate Forbin and Italian aircraft carrier Cavour from Operation Aspides in the Red Sea, June 2024.

Combined Task Force 153, under control of the U.S. Combined Maritime Forces, will control the vessels of the operation, which currently include the United States Navy's Carrier Strike Group 2. This strike group consists of the aircraft carrier USS Dwight D. Eisenhower and her escorting Arleigh Burke-class destroyers, USS Gravely, USS Laboon and USS Mason. Other countries' vessels involved include the British destroyer HMS Diamond and frigate HMS Richmond, with Greece also announcing plans to send one frigate to the region. Denmark would initially announce they would be sending one officer to aid the operation but made an additional announcement on 29 December 2023 that a frigate would also be sent.

Australia announced that it will send 11 military personnel but rejected a US request to send a warship. The Canadian Armed Forces will deploy an unspecified number of land, air and sea support vehicles. Canada is sending three staff officers by way of Operation Artemis. The Netherlands plans to send two staff officers. Norway plans on dispatching up to ten staff officers, but as of 21 December is not sending any vessels. Singapore will be deploying a team from the Republic of Singapore Navy (RSN)'s Information Fusion Centre to support information sharing and engagement outreach to the commercial shipping community, as well as a senior national representative to the Combined Maritime Forces (CMF).

Seychelles is not deploying any vessels or personnel, and limits its participation to "providing and receiving information" as a member of Combined Maritime Forces (CMF) (which is based in Bahrain). On 23 January 2024, New Zealand sent six New Zealand Defence Force personnel to help provide maritime security in the Red Sea including "precision targeting".

On 24 February 2024, Sri Lanka Navy confirmed that one of its ships had completed its maiden patrol in the Bab el-Mandeb Strait and was returning to the island but did not clarify the dates, name of the ship or plans for further patrols. It was later revealed to be SLNS Gajabahu and the Sri Lankan government confirmed that patrols would continue.

Finland announced on 8 March 2024 that the country would send up to two soldiers to support Operation Prosperity Guardian, in addition to supporting the European Union-led Operation Aspides.

On 1 February 2025, Destroyer Squadron 50 of U.S. Naval Forces Central Command assumed responsibility for leading Operation Prosperity Guardian from Combined Task Force 153.

=== Prosperity Guardian ===
- United States
  - CENTCOM
  - United States Navy
    - NAVCENT
      - Fifth Fleet
        - Carrier Strike Group 2
          - USS Dwight D. Eisenhower (Aircraft carrier)
          - USS Philippine Sea (Cruiser)
          - USS Carney (Destroyer)
          - USS Laboon (Destroyer)
          - USS Mason (Destroyer)
          - USS Thomas Hudner (Destroyer)
          - USS Arleigh Burke (Destroyer)
          - USS Bataan (Amphibious assault ships)
          - USS Florida (Submarine)
    - United States Pacific Fleet
      - Third Fleet
        - Carrier Strike Group 3
          - USS Abraham Lincoln (Aircraft Carrier)
          - USS Frank E. Petersen Jr. (Cruiser)
          - USS Stockdale (Destroyer)
          - USS Spruance (Destroyer)
          - USS O'Kane (Destroyer)
          - USS Michael Murphy (Destroyer)
        - Carrier Strike Group 9
          - USS Theodore Roosevelt (Aircraft Carrier)
          - USS Daniel Inouye (Destroyer)
          - USS Russell (Destroyer)
          - USS Halsey (Destroyer)
      - USFFC
        - Carrier Strike Group 8
          - USS Harry S. Truman (Aircraft Carrier)
          - USS Stout (Destroyer)
          - USS Jason Dunham (Destroyer)
          - USS Gravely (Destroyer)
          - USS Cole (Destroyer)
          - USS Gettysburg (Cruiser)
    - United States Naval Air Forces
      - Carrier Air Wing One
        - Strike Fighter Squadron 11
          - F/A-18F Super Hornet
        - Strike Fighter Squadron 136
          - F/A-18E Super Hornet
        - Strike Fighter Squadron 143
          - F/A-18E Super Hornet
        - Strike Fighter Squadron 81
          - F/A-18E Super Hornet
        - Carrier Airborne Early Warning Squadron 126
          - E-2D Hawkeye
        - Electronic Attack Squadron 144
          - EA-18G Growler
        - Fleet Logistics Support Squadron 40
          - C-2A Greyhound
        - Helicopter Sea Combat Squadron 11
          - MH-60S Seahawk
        - Helicopter Maritime Strike Squadron 72
          - MH-60R Seahawk
      - Carrier Air Wing Three
        - Strike Fighter Squadron 32
          - F/A-18 Super Hornets
        - Strike Fighter Squadron 83
          - F/A-18 Super Hornets
        - Strike Fighter Squadron 105
          - F/A-18 Super Hornets
        - Strike Fighter Squadron 131
          - F/A-18 Super Hornets
        - Electronic Attack Squadron 130
          - EA-18G Growler
        - Carrier Airborne Early Warning Squadron 123
          - E-2C Hawkeye
        - Helicopter Sea Combat Squadron 7
          - MH-60S Seahawk
        - Helicopter Maritime Strike Squadron 74
          - MH-60R Seahawk
      - Carrier Air Wing Nine
        - Strike Fighter Squadron 14
          - F/A-18E Super Hornet
        - Strike Fighter Squadron 41
          - F/A-18F Super Hornet
        - Marine Fighter Attack Squadron 314
          - F-35C Lightning II
        - Strike Fighter Squadron 151
          - F/A-18E Super Hornet
        - Electronic Attack Squadron 133
          - EA-18G Growler
        - Carrier Airborne Early Warning Squadron 117
          - E-2 Hawkeye
        - Helicopter Sea Combat Squadron 14
          - MH-60S Seahawk
        - Helicopter Maritime Strike Squadron 71
          - MH-60R Seahawk
    - United States Naval Special Warfare Command
      - United States Navy SEALs
  - United States Air Force
    - One KC-135 Stratotanker
    - MQ-9 Reapers
  - United States Marine Corps
    - II Marine Expeditionary Force
      - 26th Marine Expeditionary Unit
      - 2nd Marine Aircraft Wing
        - Marine Aircraft Group 14
          - McDonnell Douglas Harriers
  - United States Coast Guard
- United Kingdom
  - Royal Navy
    - HMS Diamond (Destroyer)
    - HMS Duncan (Destroyer)
    - HMS Richmond (Frigate)
    - HMS Lancaster (Frigate)
  - Royal Air Force
    - RAF Akrotiri
      - No. 903 Expeditionary Air Wing
        - Four RAF Typhoon fighters
        - Two Voyager KC2s
- Sri Lanka
  - Sri Lanka Navy
    - SLNS Gajabahu (Armed patrol vessel)
- Canada
  - Royal Canadian Navy (personnel only)
- Australia
  - Royal Australian Navy (personnel only)
- New Zealand
  - Royal New Zealand Navy (personnel only)
- Singapore
  - Republic of Singapore Navy (personnel only)
- Bahrain
  - Royal Bahraini Naval Force (personnel only)
- Seychelles
  - Seychelles Coast Guard (intelligence support)

=== Joint Operations (Prosperity Guardian + Aspides) ===
- Greece
  - Hellenic Navy
    - Hydra (Frigate)
    - Psara (Frigate)
- Denmark
  - Royal Danish Navy
    - HDMS Iver Huitfeldt (Frigate)
- Netherlands
  - Royal Netherlands Navy
    - HNLMS Tromp (Frigate)
    - HLMS Karel Doorman (Joint support ship)
    - Netherlands Naval Aviation Service
      - One NH90
      - One Eurocopter AS532 Cougar
- Sweden
  - Swedish Navy (personnel only)
- Finland
  - Finnish Navy (personnel only)

== Synopsis ==
From the day of Operation Prosperity Guardian's announcement to 30 December 2023, Fifth Fleet commander Vice Admiral Brad Cooper said the coalition had shot down 17 drones and four anti-ship ballistic missiles launched by the Houthis. During that day, the MV Maersk Hangzhou experienced a missile attack and issued a distress call, to which the USS Laboon and USS Gravely responded to. A day later, four Houthi vessels sailed towards the Maersk Hangzhou and attempted a boarding action. Helicopters from the USS Gravely and USS Dwight D. Eisenhower were dispatched and attacked the Houthi boats after being fired upon, repelling the attack and killing 10 fighters. The incident represented the first successful Houthi attack on a vessel since the start of the operation, and the first lethal engagement between Houthi and US forces during it.

In their most sophisticated attack at that point, the Houthis launched 18 drones and three missiles at coalition forces in the Red Sea on 9 January 2024.

February saw a Houthi-related incident during every day, while March had incidents in all but nine days, although an increase was reported in the volume of ballistics launched.

By January 2025, Vice Admiral Brendan McLane reported that the US Navy had neutralized 380 Houthi-launched projectiles utilizing 120 SM-2 missiles, 80 SM-6 missiles, and 20 Evolved Sea Sparrow missiles and SM-3 missiles, as well as 160 rounds from 5-inch/54-caliber Mark 45 guns. He said the attacks had increased in coordination and sophistication over time, citing the heightened usage of anti-ship ballistic missiles and one-way attack drones as an example.

With the signing of a ceasefire between the US and Houthis on 6 May 2025, Operation Prosperity Guardian was retired.

== Attacks on shipping ==
List of attacks after the announcement of Operation Prosperity Guardian
| Date | Vessel attacked | | Agent | Result | Ref |
| Date | Name | Flag | Agent | Result | Ref |
|---|---|---|---|---|---|
| 18 December 2023 | MSC Clara | Panama | Houthi drones | Unknown | |
| 18 December 2023 | Swan Atlantic | Norway | Houthi drones | Minor damage | |
| 26 December 2023 | MSC United VIII | Liberia | Houthi naval missile | Unknown | |
| 30 December 2023 | Maersk Hangzhou | Singapore | Houthi land-based missile | Minor damage | |
| 31 December 2023 | Maersk Hangzhou | Singapore | Houthi crew | Unharmed | |
| 12 January 2024 | Khalissa | Panama | Houthi projectile | Unknown | |
| 15 January 2024 | Gibraltar Eagle | Marshall Islands | Houthi anti-ship missile | Minor damage | |
| 16 January 2024 | Zografia | Malta | Ballistic missile | Minor damage | |
| 17 January 2024 | Genco Picardy | Marshall Islands | Houthi drone | Minor damage | |
| 18 January 2024 | Chem Ranger | Marshall Islands | Houthi anti-ship ballistic missile | Unharmed | |
| 22 January 2024 | Ocean Jazz | United States | Houthis | Unknown | |
| 24 January 2024 | Maersk Detroit | United States | Houthi missile | Unharmed | |
| 24 January 2024 | Maersk Chesapeake | United States | Houthi missile | Unharmed | |
| 26 January 2024 | Marlin Luanda | Marshall Islands | Houthi missile | Set afire | |
| 30 January 2024 | Koi | Liberia | Houthi naval missiles | Unknown | |
| 6 February 2024 | Morning Tide | Barbados | Houthis | Minor damage | |
| 6 February 2024 | Star Nasia | Marshall Islands | Houthis | Minor damage | |
| 12 February 2024 | Star Iris | Marshall Islands | Houthi missiles | Minor damage | |
| 16 February 2024 | Pollux | Panama | Houthi missile | Minor damage | |
| 18 February 2024 | Rubymar | Belize | Houthi anti-ship missile | Sunk | |
| 19 February 2024 | Sea Champion | Greece | Houthi naval missiles | Minor damage | |
| 19 February 2024 | Navis Fortuna | Marshall Islands | Houthi naval missile | Minor damage | |
| 22 February 2024 | Islander | Palau | Houthi missile | Damaged | |
| 6 March 2024 | True Confidence | Barbados | Houthi anti-ship missile | Set afire | |
| 8 March 2024 | Propel Fortune | Singapore | Houthi anti-ship missiles | Unknown | |
| 24 March 2024 | Huang Pu | Panama | Houthi anti-ship ballistic missile | Unknown | |
| 7 April 2024 | Hope Island | Marshall Islands | Houthis | Unknown | |
| 7 April 2024 | MSC Grace | Panama | Houthis | Unknown | |
| 7 April 2024 | MSC Gina | Panama | Houthis | Unknown | |
| 9 April 2024 | Maersk Yorktown | United States | Houthi anti-ship missile | Unharmed | |
| 9 April 2024 | MSC Gina | Panama | Houthis | Unknown | |
| 9 April 2024 | MSC Darwin VI | Liberia | Houthis | Unknown | |
| 24 April 2024 | Maersk Yorktown | United States | Houthi missile | Unharmed | |
| 24 April 2024 | HMS Diamond | United Kingdom | Houthi missile | Unharmed | |
| 24 April 2024 | MSC Veracruz | Portugal | Houthi anti-ship ballistic missile | Unknown | |
| 26 April 2024 | Andromeda Star | Panama | Houthi missiles | Minor damage | |
| 26 April 2024 | Maisha | Antigua and Barbuda | Houthi missile | Unharmed | |
| 29 April 2024 | Cyclades | Malta | Houthi missiles and UAVs | Minor damage | |
| 29 April 2024 | MSC Orion | Portugal | Houthi drones | Minor damage | |
| 18 May 2024 | Wind | Panama | Houthi missiles | Minor damage | |
| 23 May 2024 | Yannis | Malta | Houthi missiles | Unharmed | |
| 23 May 2024 | Essex | Liberia | Houthi missiles | Unharmed | |
| 28 May 2024 | Laax | Marshall Islands | Houthi missiles | Damaged | |
| 1 June 2024 | Abliani | Malta | Houthi drones and rockets | Unharmed | |
| 1 June 2024 | Maina | Malta | Houthi anti-ballistic missiles and armed drones | Unharmed | |
| 1 June 2024 | Al Oraiq | Marshall Islands | Houthi anti-ballistic missiles and armed drones | Unharmed | |
| 8–9 June 2024 | Norderney | Antigua and Barbuda | Houthi missiles | Set afire | |
| 8 June 2024 | MSC Tavivshi | Liberia | Houthi ballistic missile | Set afire | |
| 9 June 2024 | Unknown | Unknown | Houthi ballistic missile | Damaged | |
| 12 June 2024 | Tutor | Liberia | Houthi Toufan-1 USV, ballistic missiles, drones | Sunk | |
| 13 June 2024 | Verbena | Palau | Houthi cruise missiles | Set afire | |
| 13 June 2024 | Unknown | Unknown | Unknown Houthi weapons | Unharmed | |
| 16 June 2024 | Unknown | Unknown | Unknown | Unharmed | |
| 21 June 2024 | Transworld Navigator | Liberia | Houthi ballistic missiles | Unharmed | |
| 23 June 2024 | Transworld Navigator | Liberia | Houthi USV | Damaged | |
| 24 June 2024 | MSC Sarah V | Liberia | Houthi Hatem 2 hypersonic missile | Unharmed | |
| 26 June 2024 | Unknown | Unknown | Houthi missile | Unharmed | |
| 27 June 2024 | Unknown | Unknown | Likely Houthi USV | Unharmed | |
| 28 June 2024 | Delonix | Liberia | Houthi ballistic missiles | Unharmed | |
| 9 July 2024 | Maersk Sentosa | United States | Houthi missiles | Unharmed | |
| 10 July 2024 | Mount Fuji | Liberia | Likely Houthi weapons | Unharmed | |
| 11 July 2024 | Unknown | Unknown | Likely Houthi missiles | Unharmed | |
| 15 July 2024 | Bentley I | Panama | Houthi USV, patrol boats, ballistic missiles | Hit | |
| 15 July 2024 | Chios Lion | Liberia | Houthi USV | Damaged | |
| 19 July 2024 | Lobivia | Singapore | Houthi ballistic missiles, UAVs | Set afire | |
| 20 July 2024 | Pumba | Liberia | Houthi UAVs, USV | Damaged | |
| 3 August 2024 | Groton | Liberia | Houthi ballistic missiles | Hit | |
| 8–9 August 2024 | Delta Blue | Liberia | Houthi RPG, USV, missiles | Unharmed | |
| 13 August 2024 | Delta Atlantica | Liberia | Likely Houthi USV, other weapons | Hit | |
| 13 August 2024 | On Phoenix | Panama | Likely Houthi weapons | Unharmed | |
| 21–22 August 2024 | Sounion | Greece | Houthi boats, USV, other weapons | Set afire | |
| 21–22 August 2024 | SW North Wind I | Panama | Houthi USV, other weapons | Damaged | |
| 30 August 2024 | Groton | Liberia | Houthi missiles | Unharmed | |
| 2 September 2024 | Blue Lagoon I | Panama | Houthi ballistic missiles | Damaged | |
| 6 July 2025 | Magic Seas | Greece | Houthi boats, USV | Sunk | |
| 8 July 2025 | Eternity C | Liberia | Houthi boats, USV | Sunk | |

== Reactions ==
The Houthis stated: "We have capabilities to sink your fleet, your submarines, your warships", adding "the Red Sea will be your graveyard". In a public statement, Commander-in-Chief of the Islamic Revolutionary Guard Corps (IRGC) Hossein Salami reassured the Iranian public that there is nothing to fear from the coalition. (The Iranian government has long had purported direct ties to the Houthi movement.) IRGC senior officer Mohammad Reza Naqdi was cited as threatening to close "the Mediterranean Sea, (the Strait of) Gibraltar and other waterways" without explaining how.

While named by the United States as part of the coalition, the French Defense Ministry stated that its warships, including the frigate Languedoc, would remain under French command. Italian Defense Ministry, which has deployed the frigate Virginio Fasan in the Red Sea, also stated that the warship was not part of Prosperity Guardian. Spanish Defense Ministry stated that it would only take part in operations under NATO or EU coordination. Spain also vetoed any potential EU contribution to Operation Prosperity Guardian through the resources of EU-conducted Operation Atalanta. At the time, Spain was the commanding nation of Operation Atalanta and had the frigate Victoria deployed in the area.

The Maersk Line announced on 24 December 2023 that with Operation Prosperity Guardian now in place, it would resume using the Suez Canal. On 2 January 2024, both Maersk and Happag-Lloyd announced that the route would once again be avoided until further notice.

On 3 January 2024, President of Sri Lanka Ranil Wickremesinghe indicated that Sri Lanka will be deploying a warship to the Red Sea and the Sri Lanka Navy stated that it is ready to deploy one of its five Advanced Offshore Patrol Vessels as part of Operation Prosperity Guardian.

On 13 January 2024, pro-Palestinian protesters in central London expressed support for the Houthi movement, chanting slogans hours after the RAF and US launched a missile and airstrike on ground targets in Yemen. Some demonstrators shouted, "Yemen, Yemen make us proud, turn another ship around," and displayed signs reading "Hands off Yemen", "Thanks Yemen" and "UK+US wants war. Yemen supports Palestine. Gaza Wants to live".

Houthi attacks on merchant ships in the Red Sea escalated, in response to "American-British aggression against our country", as stated by a Houthi spokesman in January 2024. US Central Command then stated that the Houthi attacks "have nothing to do with the conflict in Gaza" and that Houthis had "fired indiscriminately into the Red Sea", to target vessels, affecting more than 40 nations.

In March 2024, ahead of the 9th anniversary of the Saudi-led intervention in the Yemeni civil war, Mohammed al-Houthi warned Saudi Arabia that it will resume attacking the country should it allow the US-led coalition to use its territory or airspace "in their aggression on Yemen". al-Houthi also called the US-UK strikes inside Yemen as "arrogant" and "unjustified actions", saying the Houthi rebels will not remain silent and will respond in kind.

== See also ==
- Yemeni civil war (2014–present)
- Operation Aspides
- Operation Earnest Will
- Operation Ocean Shield
- Operation Praying Mantis
- Operation Sankalp
- International Maritime Security Construct
- List of wars involving the United Kingdom
- List of wars involving the United States
- United States conflict with Iran-backed militias (2023–present)
- Denmark's role in Operation Prosperity Guardian
