= VFA-11 =

Strike Fighter Squadron 11
- Active: 1 September 1950 – present
- Country: United States
- Branch: United States Navy
- Type: Fighter/Attack
- Role: Close air support Air interdiction Aerial reconnaissance
- Part of: Carrier Air Wing One
- Garrison/HQ: NAS Oceana
- Nickname: "Red Rippers"
- Colors: Red and White
- Tail Code: AB
- Engagements: 1958 Lebanon crisis Second Taiwan Straits Crisis; Vietnam War; Multinational Force in Lebanon; Operation Earnest Will; Operation Provide Comfort; Operation Southern Watch; Operation Desert Strike; Operation Noble Eagle; Operation Enduring Freedom; Iraq War; Operation Inherent Resolve; Operation Prosperity Guardian; Operation Poseidon Archer

Commanders
- Current commander: CDR Mitchell G. Parmentier, USN

Aircraft flown
- Fighter: F4U Corsair; F9 Cougar; F2H Banshee; F-8 Crusader; F-4 Phantom; F-14 Tomcat; F/A-18F Super Hornet

Strike Fighter Squadron 11 (VFA-11) is a United States Navy strike fighter squadron stationed at Naval Air Station Oceana, Virginia, United States. The squadron was established in 1950 and is nicknamed "Red Rippers" (call sign "Ripper"). VFA-11 is equipped with the Boeing F/A-18F Super Hornet and currently assigned to Carrier Air Wing One.

== Insignia and nickname ==
The "Red Ripper" squadron insignia as described by an early member: "The boar's head is taken from the one that graces the label of the Gordon's Gin bottle. The scroll effect under the head is a string of link sausage, a good line of bologna which all members of the squadron were to be adept at 'shooting.' The balls on the shield might be called balls of fire; actually, they were supposed to typify good, strong masculinity. The bolt of lightning was the bar sinister of bastardy. The whole theme was worked into a sort of toast or creed with which the squadron members were to begin and end all good drinking bouts. The official Ripper toast is, 'Here's to us, the RED RIPPERS – a damn bunch of gin drinking, bologna slinging, two-balled, he-man bastards'." In 2011, while on liberty in Bahrain, high-ranking authorities declared the toast inappropriate and offensive; the toast was banned shortly thereafter. Slowly since, the toast has returned in more informal settings.

== History ==
VFA-11 was established as fighter squadron VF-43 in 1950 and was eventually redesignated VF-11 Red Rippers prior to its current designation as a fighter/attack squadron.

Two other squadrons have previously been designated VF-11. The first VF-11 (never known as Red Rippers) was established in 1942, was redesignated VF-111 in 1948, and was disestablished in January 1959. The second VF-11 (first to be named Red Rippers) was established as VF-5 in 1927 and went through numerous redesignations before being disestablished in February 1959.

Officially, the US Navy does not recognize a direct lineage with disestablished squadrons if a new squadron is formed with the same designation. Often, the new squadron will assume the nickname, insignia, and traditions of the earlier squadrons.

=== 1950s ===
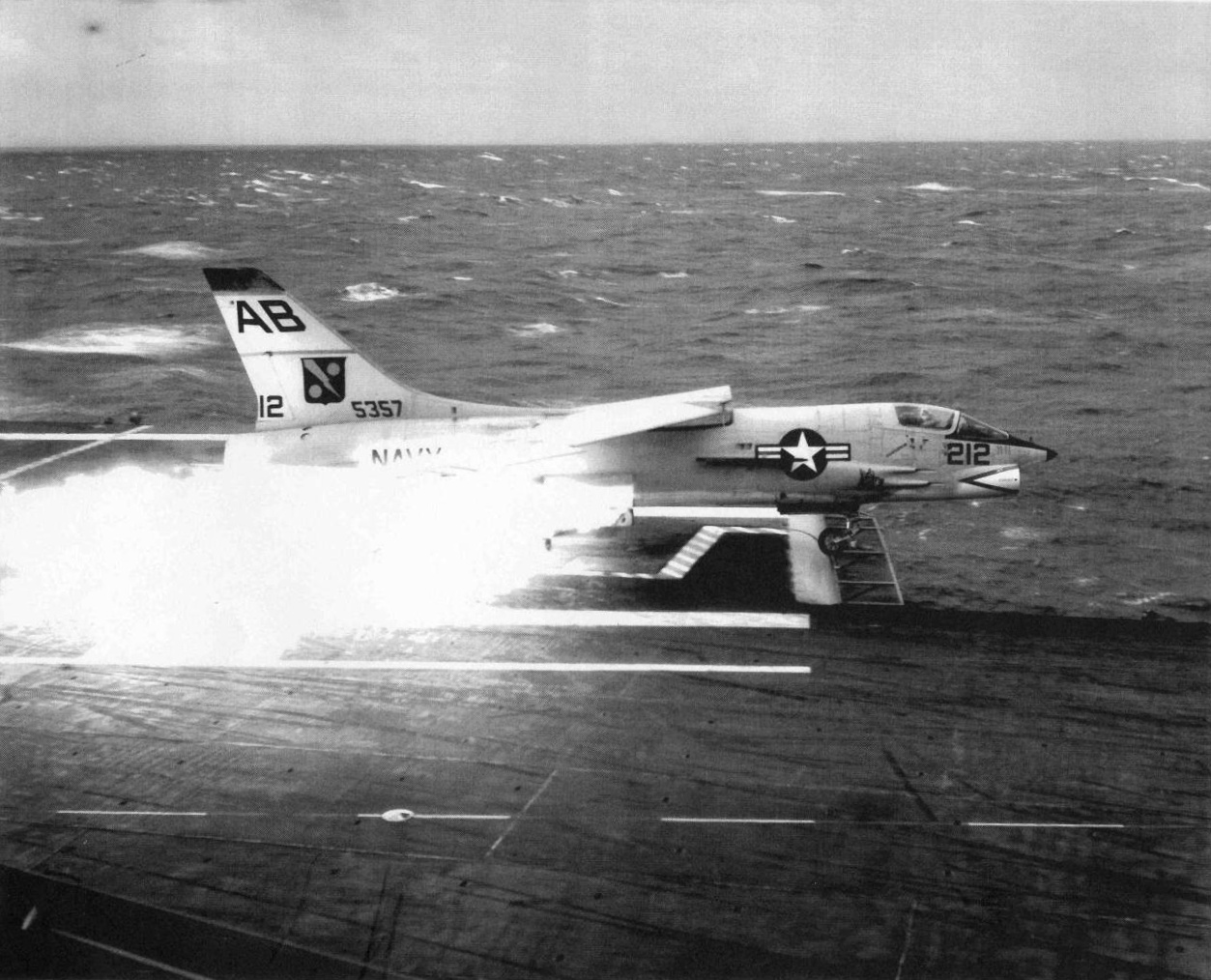
VF-11 F-8 mishap aboard USS Franklin D. Roosevelt

On 1 September 1950, Fighter Squadron 43 (VF-43), known as "Rebel's Raiders", was established at NAS Jacksonville, Florida. They moved to NAS Cecil Field on 18 September 1950, and were initially outfitted with new F4U-5N Corsair night-fighters. The squadron traded its night fighters for F4U-5s (day fighters) in October 1950. The squadron's first deployment was aboard USS Oriskany to the Mediterranean Sea from April–October 1951.

In February 1952, the squadron transitioned to the F4U-4 and deployed to the Mediterranean aboard USS Coral Sea.

In the mid-1950s, the squadron transitioned to the F9F-8 Cougar, and later shifted to F2H Banshees. In February 1958, the squadron deployed to the Mediterranean aboard USS Essex with McDonnell F2H-4 Banshees. They provided air cover for the landings in Lebanon and were sent through the Suez Canal to the Taiwan Straits during the Quemoy-Matsu shelling by the Chinese. Upon returning to the states, they were stationed at NAS Jacksonville to be disestablished on 15 February 1959, however; instead, on 16 February 1959 (the day after the second VF-11 was disestablished), VF-43 was redesignated as VF-11 at NAS Cecil Field, flying F-8 Crusaders. They adopted the traditions and insignia of the first "Red Rippers" (although they do not claim the lineage).

=== 1960s ===
VF-11 deployed aboard USS Franklin D. Roosevelt, where during the unrest in the Dominican Republic following the assassination of Rafael Trujillo in 1961. VF-11 was the first operational squadron to receive the F8U-2NE, receiving its first aircraft on 8 February 1962.

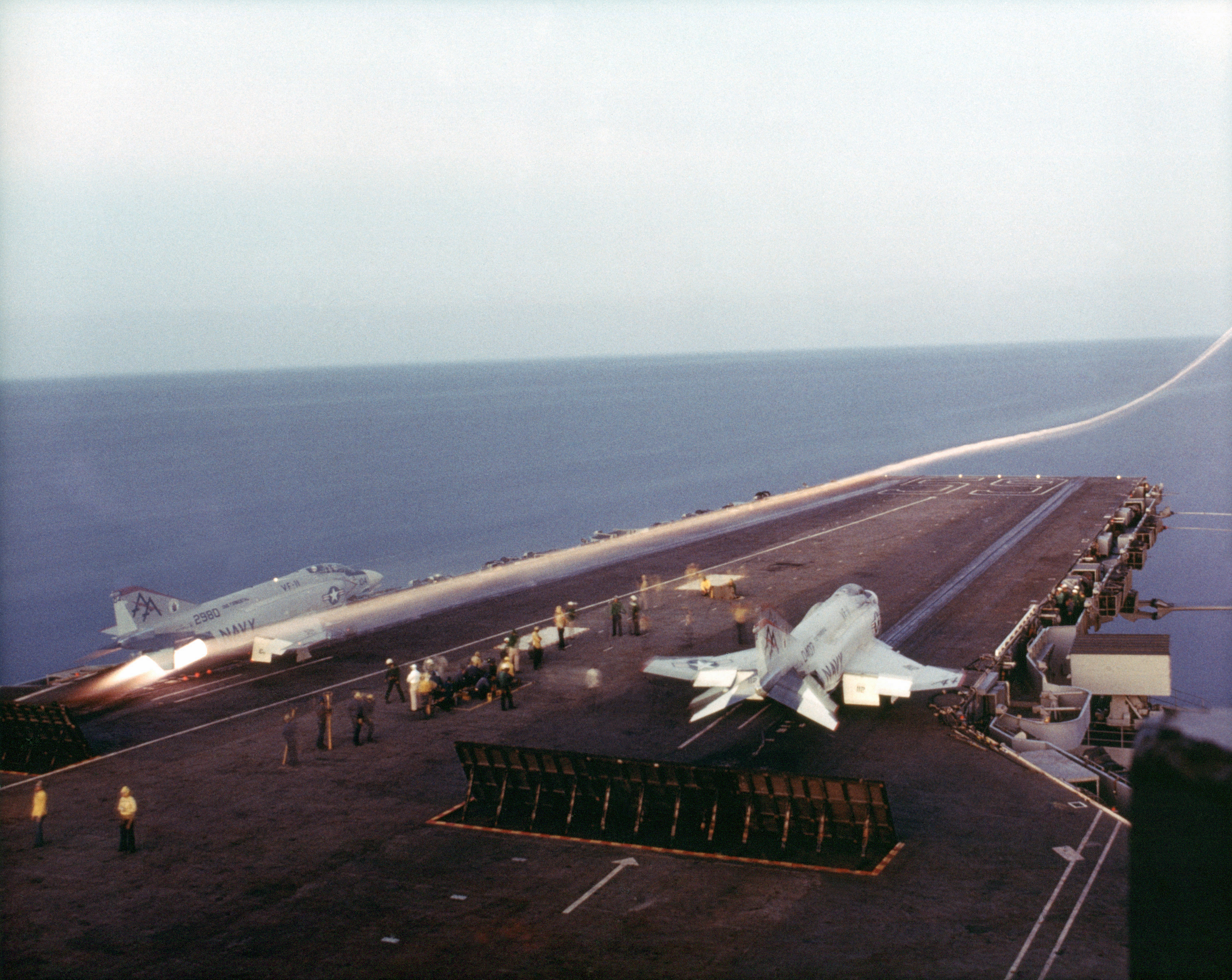
VF-11 F-4s launch from USS Forrestal

In January 1966 the squadron traded their F-8Es for F-8Ds. In the late 1966, they moved to NAS Oceana and transitioned to the F-4B Phantom. The squadron saw its first combat on 25 July 1967 over North Vietnam operating from USS Forrestal. The brief combat period on Yankee Station was cut short when, on 29 July 1967, the Forrestal fire occurred. VF-11 lost 47 men in the catastrophe.

=== 1970s ===
The squadron made several Mediterranean cruises in the 1970s aboard Forrestal. In 1972, they landed an F-4B aboard HMS Ark Royal in a cross-deck exercise. On 20 August 1973, the squadron received its first F-4J, beginning the transition from the F-4B.

=== 1980s ===
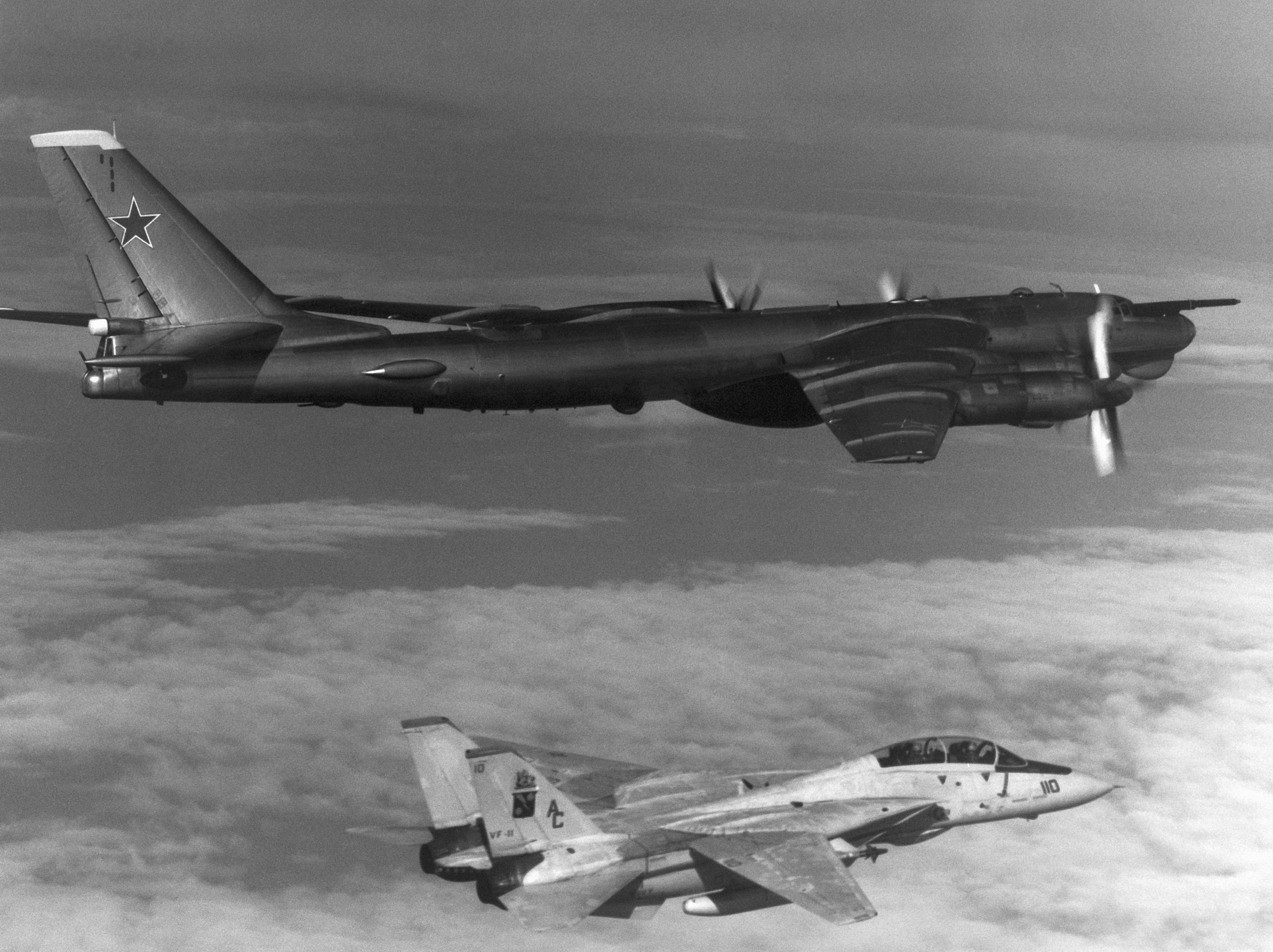
VF-11 F-14A intercepting a Soviet Tu-95 in 1985

The squadron transitioned to the F-14 Tomcat in 1980 and deployed in 1982 to the Indian ocean through the Suez canal returning on 14 July. Two years later, the squadron's combat debut in the F-14 occurred in early December 1983 when VF-11 aircraft engaged eight Syrian Air Force MiGs over Lebanon and were fired upon by Syrian surface-to-air missiles (SAM) and anti-aircraft artillery (AAA). On 4 December 1983 the squadron flew combat air patrols over a Navy strike force from the carrier USS John F. Kennedy, while A-6E Intruders from John F. Kennedy attacked Syrian positions in the Bekaa Valley. The strikes were in response to the Syrian SAM and AAA engagements. Two of the twenty-eight strong strike package were shot down, one A-7 from USS Independence and one A-6 from John F. Kennedy. The pilot of the A-6 crew died while the bombardier/navigator Lieutenant Bobby Goodman was held prisoner by the Syrians for 30 days before being released. While they were deployed for operations in Lebanon, one aircraft sustained damage from a suspected surface-to-air missile. VF-11 and three other squadrons from CVW-3 and John F. Kennedy won Battle Es for 1983. VF-11 also won the Safety 'S'.

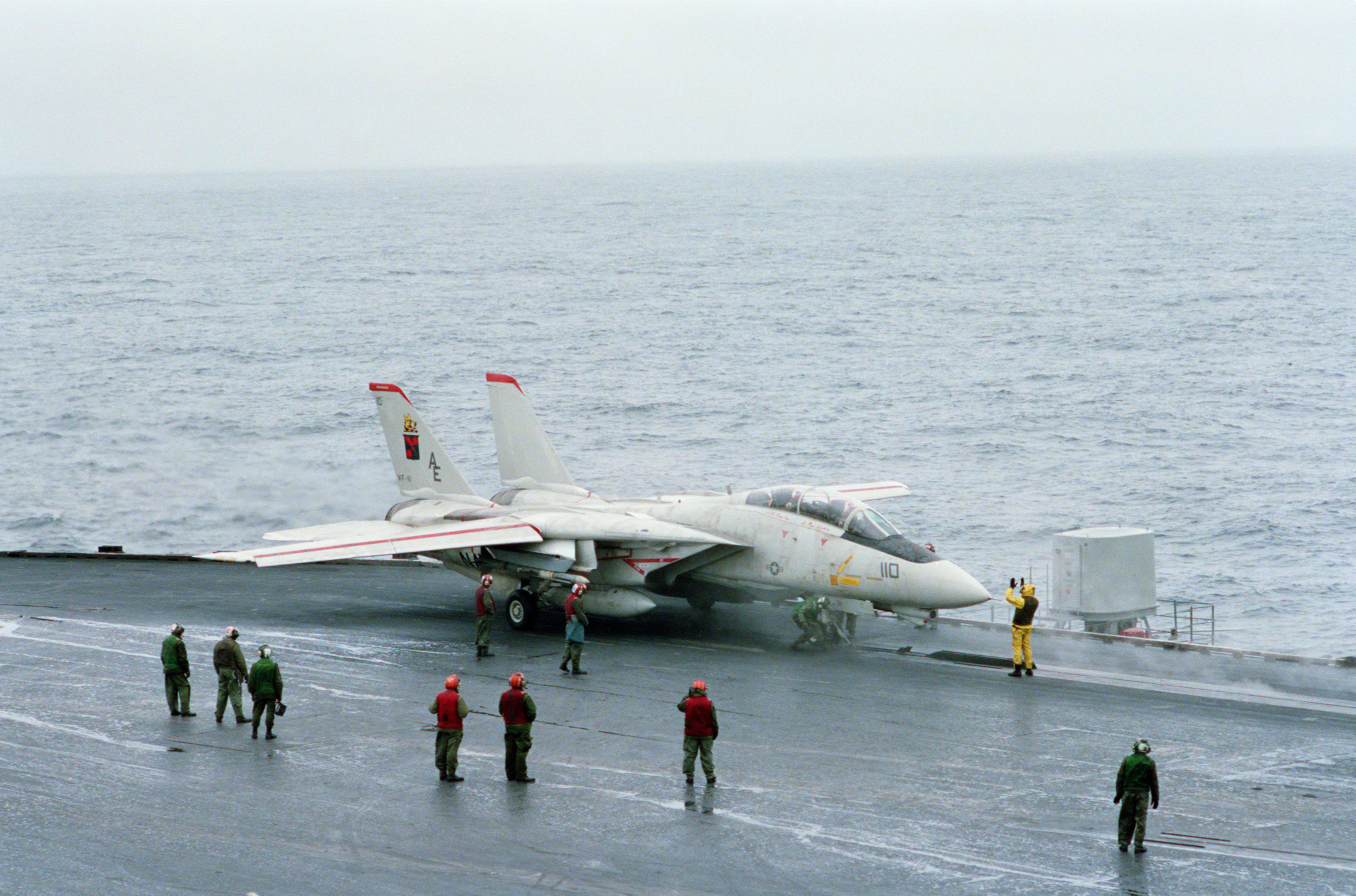
VF-11 F-14 aboard USS Forrestal, 1988

After three cruises with Carrier Air Wing Three and the John F. Kennedy Battle Group, VF-11 and its sister squadron transferred to Carrier Air Wing Six and USS Forrestal. In 1985 VF-11 won the Battle E award as the best fighter squadron in the Atlantic Fleet and the Joseph C. Clifton award as the best fighter squadron in the Navy. They deployed again in 1986 on the Forrestal where it would stay until Forrestal's decommissioning. In September 1987, VF-11 and the Forrestal battle group participated in North Atlantic exercises above the Arctic Circle. In April, 1988 VF-11 and the Forrestal battle group set sail for a six-month Indian Ocean cruise which lasted for six months. Forrestal and CVW-6, with VF-11 attached, supported Operation Earnest Will, the escort of U.S. flagged tankers in the Persian Gulf. VF-11 stayed with CVW-6/Forrestal until its last cruise in 1991, making a total of five deployments.

=== 1990s ===
During May 1991, VF-11 and other CVW-6 squadrons operating from Forrestal participated in Operation Provide Comfort, flying missions over northern Iraq in support of the Kurdish relief effort. In January 1992, VF-11 and VF-31 moved to NAS Miramar and transitioned to the F-14D Tomcat. VF-11's F-14As were transferred to VF-24 and VF-211.

In February 1994, VF-11 and CVW-14 deployed aboard USS Carl Vinson, in support of Operation Southern Watch, returning to NAS Miramar on 15 August. In late 1994, VF-11 acquired night vision goggles requiring substantial changes to the F-14's internal and instrument lighting. In 1995, VF-11 received upgrades to their mission computers, providing air-to-ground ordnance capability. VF-11 sent their first aircrews to Forward Air Controller school in September 1995. Also in 1995, VF-11 was aboard Carl Vinson when she visited Hawaii for the 50th anniversary of Victory over Japan Day

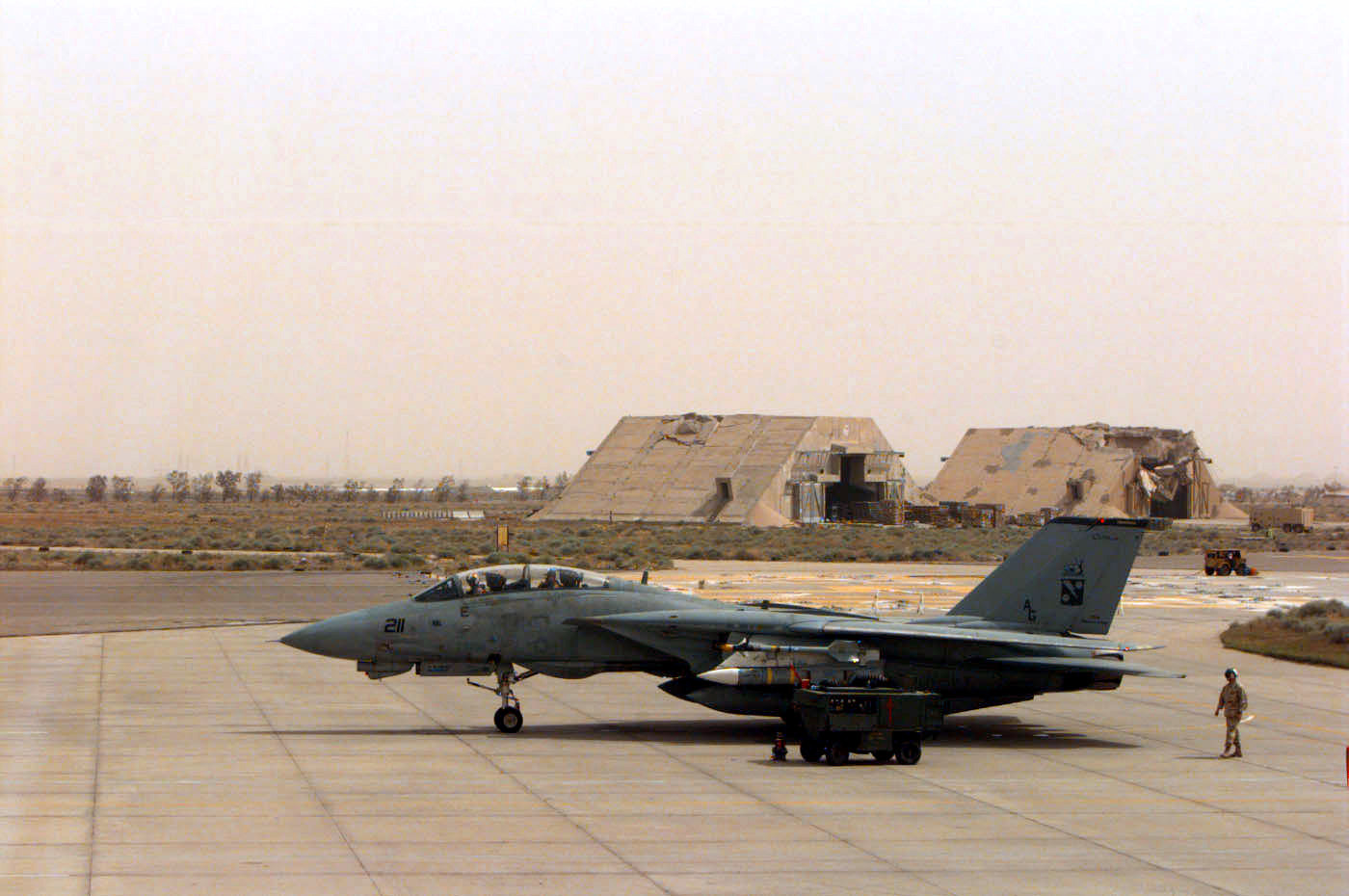
F-14B of VF-11 at Ahmed Al Jaber Air Base, Kuwait, in support of operation Southern Watch on 19 March 1998

In May 1996, CVW-14 deployed with Carl Vinson in support of Operation Southern Watch. On 31 August, the Iraqi army attacked the town of Erbil in northern Iraq and several SAM missiles were launched against U.S. aircraft. The United States responded with Operation Desert Strike by attacking targets in the southern no-fly zone with cruise missiles launched from B-52s escorted by VF-11 Tomcats. Carl Vinson left the Gulf on 1 October. Upon return from deployment, VF-11 moved to NAS Oceana as the United States Marine Corps took over Miramar. At the same time, VF-11 transitioned to the F-14B and changed air wings to Carrier Air Wing Seven.

In 1997, VF-11 was awarded the Battle E and Clifton Awards as the squadron celebrated their 70th anniversary. Also that year, VF-11 received the LANTIRN infrared targeting pod and dropped their first GBU-16 laser-guided bomb. In February 1998, the squadron deployed from Norfolk with CVW-7 aboard USS John C. Stennis on its maiden voyage/world deployment. They supported Operation Southern Watch, travelled to Australia and Pearl Harbor before the carrier arrived at its new home, Naval Air Station North Island.

=== 2000s ===
VF-11 made a deployment in 2000 aboard USS Dwight D. Eisenhower, in support of Operation Southern Watch.

Seven hours after the September 11 attacks, VF-11 emergency sortied all squadron aircraft aboard John F. Kennedy to support Operation Noble Eagle. They deployed in support of Operation Enduring Freedom in early February 2002, and employed the first JDAM bombs from F-14s in combat on 11 March 2002.

In 2004 VF-11 deployed for the last time with the F-14 aboard USS George Washington in support of Operation Iraqi Freedom. During that cruise, VF-11 F-14s participated in the bombing of Fallujah during a 48-hour period between 28 and 29 April.

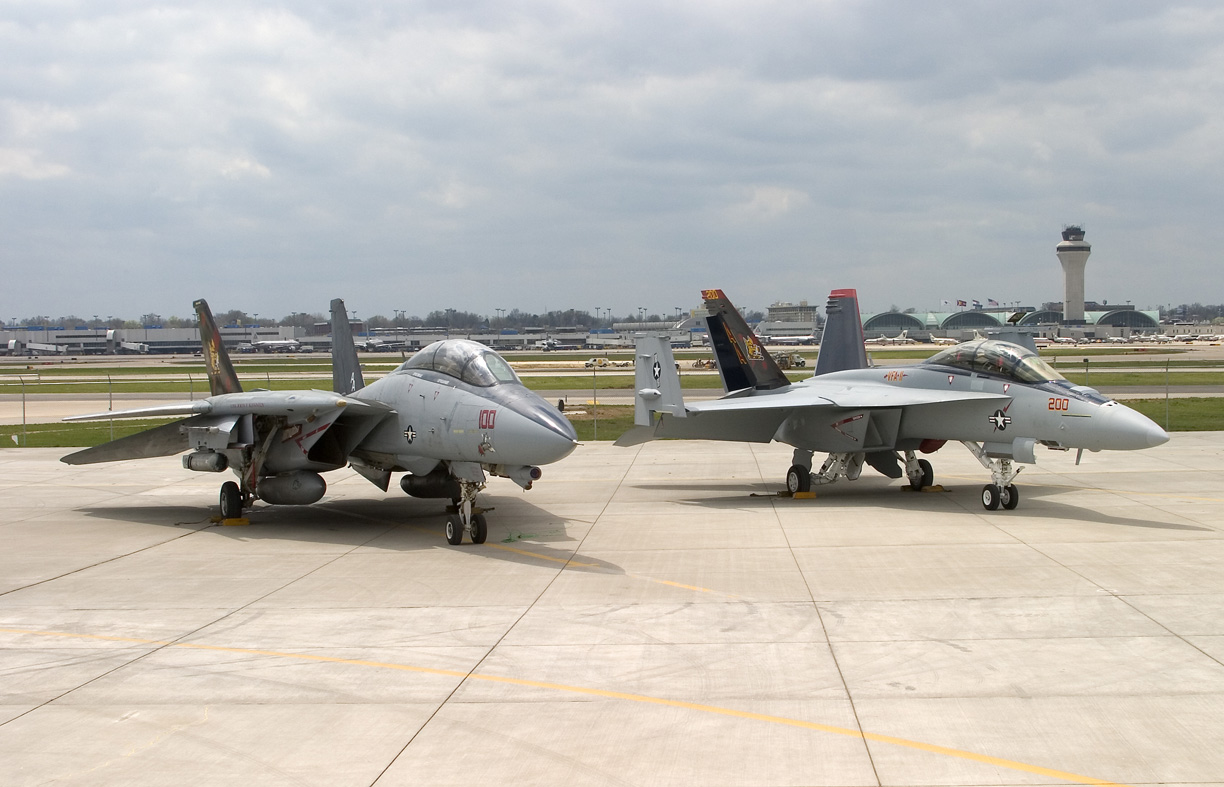
An F-14B and F/A-18F from VFA-11 (formerly VF-11) "Red Rippers". The squadron transitioned to Super Hornets in 2005

On 20 April 2005, VF-11 delivered the last of their F-14s to the "boneyard" at Davis-Monthan Air Force Base in Tucson, Arizona. The squadron reported to VFA-106 for F/A-18 Super Hornet transition training, completing on 5 November 2005.

In May 2006, VFA-11 deployed to the Caribbean Sea supporting the Partnership of the Americas for two months as part of Carrier Air Wing Seventeen. VFA-11 transferred to Carrier Air Wing Three and deployed with USS Harry S. Truman in November 2007 to the Persian Gulf. VFA-11 and the rest of CVW-3 returned home on 4 June 2008.

=== 2010s ===
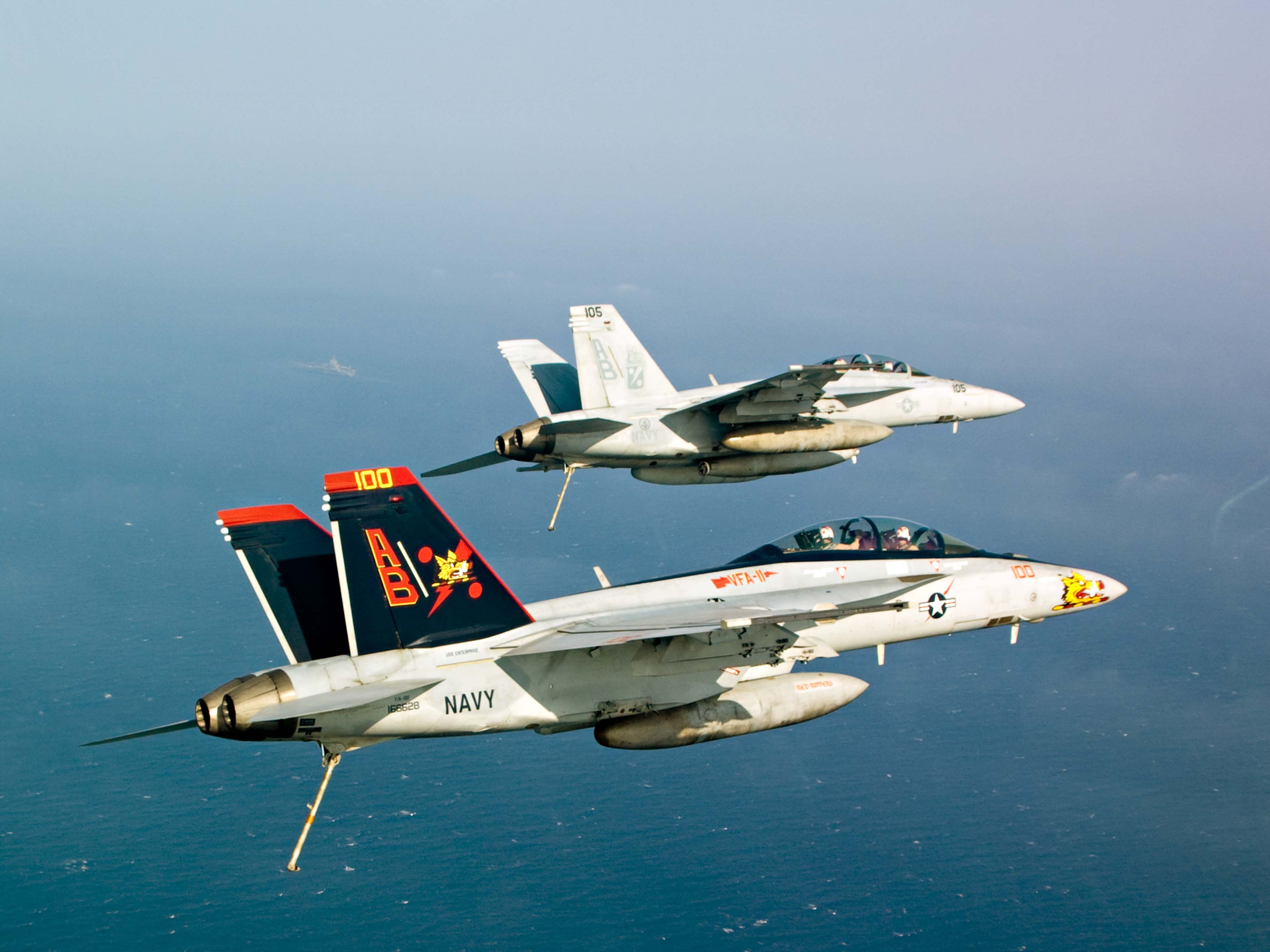
VFA-11 F/A-18Fs over the Red Sea in 2012

In January 2011, VFA-11 joined CVW-1 on board USS Enterprise for a deployment supporting Operation Enduring Freedom in the U.S. 5th Fleet area of responsibility. Following the retirement of USS Enterprise in December 2012, CVW-1 was reassigned to USS Theodore Roosevelt.

On 11 March 2015, the Theodore Roosevelt Carrier Strike Group departed Naval Station Norfolk for around the world tour with deployments to the U.S. 5th, 6th and 7th Fleets, before arriving in their new homeport of San Diego, California.

=== 2020s ===
In late September 2024, VFA-11 and their F/A-18Fs departed the US as part of CVW-1 on a scheduled deployment aboard Harry S. Truman. Following multiple exercises with European militaries, VFA-11 and CVW-1 were ordered to operate in the Red Sea in defense of international shipping lanes and Israel against Houthi/Iran proxy military unit attacks from Yemen. VFA-11 and CVW-1 arrived in the CENTCOM Area of Responsibility in mid December 2024 with combat operations against the Houthis/Iranians commencing upon arrival to the Red Sea.

On 22 December 2024, a F/A-18F Super Hornet belonging to VFA-11 and flying off Harry S Truman was accidentally shot down over the Red Sea in a friendly-fire incident by the cruiser USS Gettysburg, which was part of the Carrier Strike Group. Both pilots ejected and were recovered safely shortly after, with only one receiving minor injuries after an initial assessment.

Airstrikes were undertaken against the Houthis/Iranians for much of the later half of December 2024 through April 2025. Strikes against the Houthis/Iranian proxy military units in Yemen increased significantly following 15 March 2025, with VFA-11 and CVW-1 conducting increased sorties on a larger set of enemy targets.

On May 6 2025, an F/A-18F Super Hornet from VFA-11 fell off the USS Harry S Truman in the Red Sea. The aircraft was landing on the deck of the boat when there was a failure with the arresting cable system which sent the jet overboard. Both crew members ejected and were safely recovered.

In the summer of 2025, VFA-11 received its first Block III upgraded Super Hornet.

== See also ==
- Naval aviation
- List of United States Navy aircraft squadrons
- List of Inactive United States Navy aircraft squadrons
