= Boeing F3B =

Fighter aircraft family by Boeing

F3B
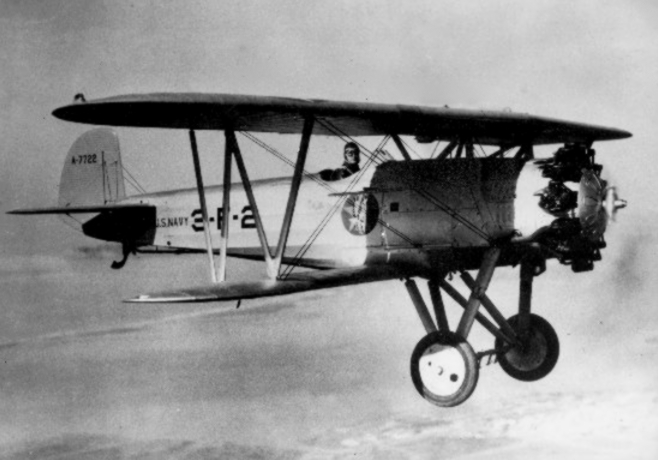
- Boeing F3B-1, U.S. Navy Photo

General information
- Type: Carrier-based Fighter-Bomber
- Manufacturer: Boeing
- Primary user: United States Navy
- Number built: 74 including the prototype

History
- Introduction date: August 1928
- First flight: 3 February 1928
- Developed from: Boeing F2B, FB-5

The Boeing F3B was a biplane fighter and fighter bomber that served with the United States Navy from 1928 into the early 1930s.

== Design and development ==
Designed by the company as its Model 74, the plane was an incremental improvement over the F2B. The Navy-designated prototype XF3B-1 still had the tapered wings of the F2B for instance, but was built as a single-float seaplane using the FB-5 undercarriage. However, the growing use of aircraft carriers took away most of the need for floating fighters, and by the time other test results had been taken into account, the production F3B-1 (Model 77) had a larger upper wing that was slightly swept back and a redesigned tail with surfaces made from corrugated aluminum. It also eliminated the spreader bar arrangement of the undercarriage and revised the vertical tail shape.

== Operational history ==
It first flew on 3 February 1928, turning in a respectable performance and garnering Boeing a contract for 73 more. F3Bs served as fighter-bombers for some four years with the squadrons VF-2B aboard USS Langley, VB-2B aboard USS Saratoga (later VF-6B), and VB-1B on USS Lexington, during which period some were fitted with Townend rings and others with streamlined wheel fairings. The aircraft remained in first-line service to 1932 and were then retained as "hacks" (command and staff transports) for several more years.

== Variants ==
XF3B-1
(Model 74) One prototype serial number A7674
F3B-1
(Model 77) Single-seat fighter biplane for the US Navy, 73 aircraft serial numbers A7675-A7691; A7708-A7763

== Operators ==
United States

- United States Navy

== Specifications (F3B-1) ==
Data from The Complete Encyclopedia of World Aircraft

General characteristics

- Crew: 1
- Length: 24 ft 10 in (7.57 m)
- Wingspan: 33 ft 0 in (10.06 m)
- Height: 9 ft 2 in (2.79 m)
- Wing area: 275 sq ft (25.55 m^{2})
- Empty weight: 2,179 lb (988 kg)
- Max takeoff weight: 2,945 lb (1,336 kg)
- Powerplant: 1 × Pratt & Whitney R-1340-80 Wasp radial engine, 425 hp (317 kW)

Performance

- Maximum speed: 157 mph (253 km/h, 137 kn)
- Cruise speed: 131 mph (211 km/h, 114 kn)
- Range: 340 mi (547 km, 296 nmi)
- Service ceiling: 21,500 ft (6,600 m)
- Rate of climb: 2,020 ft/min (10.26 m/s)

Armament

- Guns: Two 0.3 in (7.62mm) forward firing Browning machine guns in the forward fuselage
- Bombs: Five 25 lb (11.3 kg) bombs carried under the fuselage and lower wing

== See also ==
Related development

- Boeing F2B
- Boeing Model 15

Related lists

- List of military aircraft of the United States
- List of fighter aircraft
