= Operation Long Arm =

1992 anti-CSAM crackdown by USA and Denmark

Operation Long Arm was the first recorded crackdown on internet child pornography in the United States, involving the United States Customs Service along with Danish law enforcement. It led to 34 arrests and convictions in the US, as well as two in Australia.

== Overview ==
In early 1992, a tip-off stemming from the arrest of an individual attempting to purchase a child pornography VHS cassette from an undercover police in Miami led to the uncovering of a Bulletin Board System (BBS) based in Denmark, called Bamse. The network operated on a subscription basis of $80 annually or the exchange of child pornography images. At the time of its shutdown, it boasted a peak of 900 active users from countries including the United States, Denmark and Australia.
