= Outline of the Houthi movement =

Topical index of English Wikipedia articles about the Houthis

Ansar Allah أنصار الله
- The slogan and emblem of the Houthis (The Sarkha) translated as, "God is the Greatest, Death to America, Death to Israel, Curse be upon the Jews, Victory to Islam"
- Founder: Hussein al-Houthi
- Founded: 1994; 32 years ago
- Preceded by: Believing Youth
- Membership: 350,000 (2024)
- Ideology: Khomeinism; Shia Islamism; Pan-Islamism; Anti-imperialism; Anti-Zionism; Arab nationalism; Pan-Arabism; Yemeni nationalism; Zaydi revivalism; Populism
- Religion: Shia Islam (Zaydi)
- International affiliation: Axis of Resistance

Website
- ansarollah.com.ye/en/

The following is a topical outline of the English language Wikipedia articles on the topic of the Houthis.

The Houthis, (Note: /ˈhuːθiːz/; Arabic: الحوثيون, romanized: al-Ḥūthiyūn, ar) officially known as Ansar Allah, (Note: Arabic: أنصار الله, romanized: ʾAnṣār Allāh, lit. 'Partisans of God', pronounced [ʔansˤaːr ɑɫˈɫɑh]) is a Zaydi revivalist and Shia Islamist political and military organization that emerged from Yemen in the 1990s. It is predominantly made up of Zaydis, whose namesake leadership is drawn largely from the al-Houthi family. The group has been a central player in Yemen's civil war, drawing widespread international condemnation for its human rights abuses, including targeting civilians. The movement is designated as a terrorist organization by some countries and they are widely considered part of the Iranian-led "Axis of Resistance".

== Houthi movement ==
- Houthis
- Shia Islam in Yemen
- History of Yemen

=== Organization, ideology and media ===
- Supreme Political Council
- Supreme Revolutionary Committee
- Al-Houthi family
- Sarkha
- Al-Masirah

== History ==
=== Houthi insurgency (2004–2010) ===
- Houthi insurgency
- Battle of Saada
- Operation Scorched Earth
- Operation Blow to the Head
- Siege of Dammaj

=== Takeover of Yemen (2014–2015) ===
- Battle of Amran
- Battle of Sanaa (2014)
- Houthi takeover of Yemen
- Aftermath of the Houthi takeover in Yemen

=== Civil war and conflict with Saudi Arabia ===
- Yemeni civil war (2014–present)
- Saudi-led intervention in the Yemeni civil war
- Houthi–Saudi Arabian conflict
- Houthi blockade of Saudi Arabia

=== Red Sea crisis (2023–present) ===
- Red Sea crisis
- Timeline of the Red Sea crisis
  - Timeline of the Red Sea crisis (2023)
  - Timeline of the Red Sea crisis (2024)
  - Timeline of the Red Sea crisis (2025)
- Houthi attacks on commercial vessels
- Red Sea crisis order of battle
- Houthis in the 2026 Iran war
- 2025 United States–Houthi ceasefire

== Attacks by the Houthis ==
=== Shipping ===
- Hijacking of the Galaxy Leader
- Galaxy Leader
- Attacks on the Eternity C
- Attacks on the MV Maersk Hangzhou
- Marlin Luanda missile strike
- MV Rubymar
- Attacks on the Sounion
- MV True Confidence
- Attacks on the MV Tutor

=== Israel ===
- July 2024 Houthi–Israel attacks
- 2025 Houthi attack on Tel Aviv airport
- 2025 Eilat drone attack

=== Saudi Arabia and the United Arab Emirates ===
- 2018 Riyadh missile strike
- 2019 Afif attack
- 2019 Abha International Airport attacks
- Abqaiq–Khurais attack
- 2020 Riyadh drone and missile attack
- 2022 Abu Dhabi attack
- 2022 Jeddah missile attack

=== Yemen ===
- 2015 Marib attack
- 2015 Taiz attack
- 2019 Anad base drone strike
- January 2020 Marib attack
- August 2020 Marib attack
- 2020 Aden airport attack
- 2021 Anad airbase attack
- 2021 occupation of the United States embassy compound in Yemen
- Marib petrol station attack
- 2024 al-Bayda bombing
- Assassination of Thabet Gawas

== Operations and strikes against the Houthis ==
=== Multinational naval operations ===
- Operation Prosperity Guardian
- Operation Aspides
- Multinational Maritime Defense Alliance

=== Airstrikes ===
- Sanaa funeral airstrike
- US–UK airstrikes on Yemen
- 30 May 2024 attacks on Yemen
- 29 September 2024 Israeli attacks on Yemen
- December 2024 Israeli airstrikes in Yemen
- 10 January 2025 Israeli attack on Yemen
- March–May 2025 United States attacks in Yemen
  - United States government group chat leaks
- 2025 Ras Isa oil terminal airstrikes
- 2025 Israeli attacks in Yemen
- August 2025 Israeli attack on Sanaa
- September 2025 Israeli attacks in Yemen

== Governance and humanitarian impact ==
- Houthi-controlled Yemen
- Impact of Houthi policies on Yemen's humanitarian sector and NGOs
- FSO Safer
- Levi Marhabi

== External relations and designations ==
- Iranian support for the Houthis
- Executive Order 14175
- United Nations Security Council Resolution 2722

== Individuals ==
- Jamal Amer
- Ali Al Bukhaiti
- Muhammad Abd al-Karim al-Ghamari
- Abdul-Malik al-Houthi
- Badreddin al-Houthi
- Hussein al-Houthi
- Mohammed al-Houthi
- Yahia al-Houthi
- Yusuf al-Madani
- Fares Manaa
- Mahdi al-Mashat
- Muhammad Ahmed Miftah
- Ahmed al-Rahawi
- Abdullah al-Ruzami
- Saleh Ali al-Sammad
- Yahya Saree

== Related Outlines ==
- Outline of the Yemeni crisis, revolution, and civil war (2011–present)
- Outline of the Gaza war
- Outline of the 2026 Iran war
- Outline of the 2023 Israel-Hamas war

== Miscellaneous ==
- Axis of Resistance
- Bab-el-Mandeb
- Zaydism

== See also ==
- 2026 Iran war
- Gaza war
- Hezbollah
- Iran–Israel conflict
- Iran–Yemen relations
- Islamic Resistance in Iraq
- Islamic Revolutionary Guard Corps
- Kingdom of Yemen
- North Yemen civil war
- Politics of Yemen
- Tribes of Yemen
- Yemeni crisis
