= Al-Houthi =

Al-Houthi (Arabic: الحوثي) is the tribal surname of Houthi tribe and it is the surname of four brothers who have or are leading the Zaidi Shia insurgency in Yemen and whose followers are referred to as the Houthis.

- Abdul-Malik al-Houthi (born 1979)
- Badreddin al-Houthi (1926–2010)
- Hussein al-Houthi (1959–2004)
- Mohammed al-Houthi (born 1979)
- Yahia al-Houthi (born 1961)
