= Yusuf al-Madani =

Yemeni military officer (born 1977)

Major general Yusuf al-Madani
- يوسف المداني

Chief of Staff of the Yemeni Armed Forces disputed by Sagheer Hamoud Aziz (Presidential Leadership Council)
- Incumbent
- Assumed office 16 October 2025
- Appointed by: Mahdi al-Mashat
- President: Mahdi al-Mashat
- Prime Minister: Muhammad Ahmed Miftah
- Preceded by: Muhammad Abd al-Karim al-Ghamari

Personal details
- Born: Yusuf Hassan Ismail Al-Madani; 1977 (age 48–49) Abu Dawar, Mustaba district, Hajjah Governorate, North Yemen
- Nickname: Abu Husayn (kunya)

Military service
- Allegiance: Yemen (de facto under Supreme Political Council)
- Branch/service: Yemeni Army (SPC); Houthis
- Years of service: c. 2002–present
- Rank: Major general
- Battles/wars: Houthi insurgency; Battle of Amran; Yemeni civil war; Battle of Sanaa (2014); Al Hudaydah offensive; Marib campaign; Red Sea crisis; Houthi attacks on commercial vessels; 2026 Yemen offensives

Yusuf al-Madani (Note: Arabic: يوسف المداني, romanized: Yūsuf al-Madanī) (born 1977) is a Yemeni military officer who is the current chief of staff of the Houthi-led faction of the Yemeni Armed Forces. He is the brother-in-law of Houthi leader Abdul-Malik al-Houthi, and previously commanded the group's Fifth Regional Corps, which oversaw Yemen's Red Sea coastline. He has faced sanctions by the United Nations and various countries over his role in the Yemeni civil war.

A veteran Houthi commander, he has been involved in wars against the Yemeni government since the outbreak of the Houthi insurgency. He is a liaison between the Houthis and Iran and Hezbollah, having held close ties to the Iranian Quds Force leader Qasem Soleimani. He is seen as a possible successor to al-Houthi as leader of the Houthi group.

== Early life ==
Al-Madani was born to an religious Zaydi family in 1977 in Abu Dawar, Mustaba district, Hajjah Governorate. He failed to study in public schools, so his father enrolled him into a religious school in Saada Governorate, where he was taught by Houthi cleric Majd al-Din al-Muayyad.

He is the middle child of ten siblings. His brother, Taha, was a prominent Houthi member who was killed in 2017.

== Military career ==
=== Early career and Iran ties ===
Al-Madani left his studies at al-Muayyad's school to join Al-Shabab al-Mu'min (Young Believers) in the Maran Mountains, which was founded by Hussein al-Houthi and served as the ideological predecessor of the Houthi movement. In 2002, he traveled to Iran, where he was trained by the Islamic Revolutionary Guard Corps (IRGC) before returning to Yemen the following year. He also traveled to southern Lebanon, where he was trained by Hezbollah. He was one of the first Houthis to travel to these places.

After his return to Yemen, Al-Madani managed the training of Houthi fighters in both local Yemeni training camps and IRGC camps in Iran and Syria. He also controlled logistical operations. A liaison between the Houthis and their allies Iran and Hezbollah, he oversaw communication and the transportation of IRGC and Hezbollah personnel to Yemen, which was critical in developing the Houthis' military capabilities. Senior Hezbollah leader Imad Mughniyeh recommended al-Madani's appointment as Quds Force commander Qasem Soleimani's associate, a position he held until Soleimani's assassination in 2020.

=== Houthi insurgency ===
Al-Madani became the second-in-command of the Houthi military wing after Hussein al-Houthi's killing in 2004. Al-Madani saw himself as the most worthy successor to Hussein, leading to a conflict with senior Houthi member Abdullah al-Ruzami, who attempted to appoint himself as the group's leader. Al-Madani then declared himself the military commander of the militia. In an effort to resolve the conflict, Badreddin al-Houthi appointed his son, Abdul-Malik, as the group's new leader.

During the Houthi insurgency, al-Madani served as a commander during all six wars against the Yemeni government between 2004 and 2010. In 2009, he was reportedly wounded in action. The following year, he was granted temporary leadership of the Houthi group after al-Houthi was seriously wounded. In 2011, he introduced the use of "hard power" in Hajjah Governorate, where the Houthis had previously used "soft power" to gain control. After he moved into Abu Dawar, he and up to 200 fighters began violently converting residents and establishing checkpoints in the area. According to the Houthis, al-Madani and his followers were harassed and resorted to violence as self-defense.

Al-Madani managed military operations in Amran alongside Abdul-Malik al-Houthi and Abu Ali al-Hakem. He was one of the Houthis who oversaw the killing of 310th Armored Brigade commander Brigadier General Hameed Al-Qushaibi. He was a prominent field commander during the takeover of Sanaa in September 2014, where he released Iranians who were detained by the government for espionage and arms smuggling. However, al-Houthi removed him from the group's military command during the offensive and appointed his brother, Abdulkhaleq al-Houthi, to lead the battle.

=== Yemeni civil war ===
Following his dismissal from the Houthi military command, al-Madani was appointed as the vice chairman of the Supreme Security Committee before becoming the committee's chairman, alongside a promotion to general. After the Houthis established a governing council in the areas under their control, they named Saleh Ali al-Sammad as its president, in a perceived attempt to convey that al-Madani's role in the group was strictly military and not political. However, al-Madani's close relations with Soleimani shielded him from further attempts by the Houthi leadership to weaken his influence in the group.

He is a member of the command and control structure of the Houthis' Jihad Council, tasked with the role of ensuring efficiency on battlefields, particularly in major offensives. In 2015, he became responsible for military and tribal relationships and developing military and ideological influence. In 2017, he became commander of the military's Fifth Regional Corps—comprising the areas of Hodeidah, Hajjah, Al Mahwit, and Raymah—where he oversaw the Red Sea coastline and naval activities. In Hodeidah, he violated ceasefire provisions set by the Hudaydah Agreement by using military operations to exacerbate the humanitarian crisis and use it as a continual source of pressure against the Saudi-led coalition.

He led an offensive to seize control of Marib's energy resources in 2021 that was thwarted by the Yemeni army, resulting in heavy casualties. However, it strengthened the group's presence in several of the governorate's districts. He later oversaw Houthi naval attacks during the Red Sea crisis.

On 16 October 2025, he was appointed as the Houthi military chief of staff after his predecessor, Muhammad Abd al-Karim al-Ghamari, was killed by an Israeli airstrike in August. Political analyst Baraa Shiban said that al-Madani could be a possible successor to Abdul-Malik al-Houthi in the event of his death.

During the September 2026 Yemen offensives, al-Madani was reportedly stationed in Al-Hudaydah Governorate to oversee the Houthi offensive on Yemen's west coast.

== Sanctions ==
On 20 May 2021, he was sanctioned by the United States Department of the Treasury and designated as a Specially Designated Global Terrorist. On 11 November, the United Nations Security Council sanctioned al-Madani for his involvement in activities that threatened Yemen's stability. He has also been sanctioned by Australia, Belgium, the European Union, France, Japan, Monaco, South Africa, Switzerland, Ukraine, and the United Kingdom.

== Personal life ==
Al-Madani is married to the daughter of Hussein al-Houthi, and he is the brother-in-law of current Houthi leader Abdul-Malik al-Houthi. He belongs to Zaydism's "Sayyid" class.
