= Operation Scorched Earth =

Yemeni military offensive in the northern Saada Governorate

- Part of the Houthi insurgency in Yemen and Iran–Saudi Arabia proxy conflict
Date	11 August 2009 – 12 February 2010 (6 months and 1 day)
Location	Saada Governorate, Yemen and Jabal al-Dukhan, Jazan Province, Saudi Arabia
Result	Stalemate: Ceasefire after rebels accepted the government's truce conditions.

Belligerents
Yemen; Hashed tribesmen Saudi Arabia; Alleged support: Morocco; Jordan	Houthis; Alleged support: Iran: Quds Force; Hezbollah

Commanders and leaders
(Yemen) Ali Abdullah Saleh (Yemen) Ali Mohammed Mujur (Yemen) Ali Mohsen al-Ahmar (Yemen) Amr Ali Mousa Al-Uuzali † (Yemen) Ali Salem al-Ameri † (Saudi Arabia) Abdullah bin Abdul Aziz Al Saud (Saudi Arabia) Khalid bin Sultan	Abdul-Malik al-Houthi; Yahya Badreddin al-Houthi; Yusuf al-Madani; Taha al-Madani; Abu Ali Hakem; Abdullah al-Qa'ud; Abu Nasir

Strength
Yemen: 30,000 in-theatre 66,700 total 3,000 tribal fighters Saudi Arabia: 199,500 total Alleged: Jordan: 2,000; Morocco Hundreds al-Qaeda: 300	100,000–150,000 Houthi rebels Alleged: 200 Somali fighters

Casualties and losses
Yemen: 126+ KIA (Government confirmed); 144–159 KIA (Independent estimate); 400–500 POW; 3 fighter jets lost 69 Salafi fighters killed Saudi Arabia: 133 KIA; 470 WIA; 6 MIA (Saudi claim); Total: 328–361 killed	600+ KIA (Government claim); 458–544 KIA (Independent estimate); 1,000 POW (including at least 26 Somalis); Total: 458–600 killed
- Total Yemeni Casualties: 8,000 killed Saudi Civilian Casualties: 4 civilians killed 50,000 displaced

Operation Scorched Earth (Arabic: عملية الأرض المحروقة) was the code-name of a Yemeni military offensive in the Saada Governorate that began in August 2009. It marked the sixth wave of violence during the ongoing insurgency by the Houthis against the government. In November 2009, the conflict spread across the border into neighboring Saudi Arabia. This conflict led to the Saudi military's incursion into Yemen, marking the first military operation conducted by Saudi Arabia since 1991.

== Background ==
Skirmishes and clashes between the two sides began in June 2009, when nine foreigners were abducted during a picnic in the Saada Governorate. Three bodies were found which belonged to a South Korean teacher and two German nurses. In addition, two German children were freed in May 2010 by Saudi and Yemeni forces. The remaining party members are still missing, and their current status is unknown. It remains unclear who was behind the abduction. Initial official statements suggested Houthi rebels had seized the group. However, according to Yemen's news agency, Houthi rebels accused drug cartels of the kidnapping and the three subsequent murders. A spokesman for the insurgents accused regional tribes of being responsible for the kidnappings and slayings.

A government committee criticized the fighters for not abiding by an agreement to end hostilities announced by the Yemeni president in July 2008. In July and early August 2009, local officials said the fighters had taken control of parts of the Saada Governorate, including a vital army post near the province's capital.

== Operation ==
=== August–September, 2009 ===
After the government promised to adopt an "iron fist" policy against the rebels, Yemeni troops backed by tanks and fighter aircraft launched a major offensive on rebel strongholds on 11 August 2009. Air, artillery, and missile attacks targeted the Malaheedh, Mahadher, Khafji, and Hasama districts, including the headquarters of the rebel leader Abdul-Malik al-Houthi.

After two days of bombardment, the Yemeni government offered ceasefire terms to the rebels, which included demands for information on the six hostages who disappeared back in June. The rebels rejected the terms, and the fighting continued. After three weeks, the provincial capital Sa'dah was further cut off. Mobile landlines were suspended after the Houthis shelled a communications tower in the neighboring Amran province. The rebels held out in Sa'dah neighborhoods and old mountain fortresses around the city.

In September, the first of many ceasefires was agreed. The Yemeni army pushed to secure the road that links Sa'dah to Harf Sufyan, launching salvos of shells to "demine" and "remove bombs" for humanitarian convoys. On 17 September, an airstrike claimed the lives of more than 80 people in a camp for displaced people in the 'Amran Governorate'. On the same day, rebels and government forces also saw massive military action around Sa'dah. Yemeni press releases and military officials claimed that several Houthi leaders were among the dead.

=== Eid attacks ===
Another ceasefire was agreed on 19 September in commemoration of the Islamic holiday, Eid ul-fitr. The government announced on state television that the ceasefire would go into effect for three days, with the possibility of becoming a permanent ceasefire upon certain conditions being met. The Houthis responded by saying they would abide by the ceasefire in exchange for prisoners, some of which they claimed had been held for years.

However, both sides claimed that the other had not laid down arms. The Houthis asserted that the government continued air and rocket attacks. In contrast, the government claimed the Houthis launched attacks in the Amran and Saada provinces. A Human Rights Watch report noted how the Houthis attacked the village of Mudaqqa on 16 September, prompting a government response.

The next day, the rebels attacked Sa'dah from three directions in a pre-dawn strike. Hundreds of fighters used at least 70 vehicles to assault checkpoints in the city while storming the Republican Palace. After four hours of combat, the attack was repelled by government air support. The Yemeni government claimed to have killed 153 rebels and captured 70, while only having suffered two deaths and 20 injuries.

=== October, 2009 ===
Fighting continued into October, with Houthi rebels claiming to have captured the town of Munabbih, one of the fifteen districts of the Sa'dah governorate.

On 2 October 2009, the Houthis announced that they had successfully shot down a Yemen Air Force MiG-21 fighter jet in the al-Sha'af district. A senior Yemeni military official denied the claim and said the plane ran into a mountain peak because of a technical fault. Contrary to state media, another Yemeni military commander told the AFP news agency that the aircraft had been "flying at low altitude" when it was hit. Three days later, a Yemeni Sukhoi jet crashed northeast of Sa'dah in the Alanad district; the rebels claimed to have shot it down while the government again attributed the crash to technical problems. Further reports by Yemeni sources also claim these planes were shot down, adding that agents of Hezbollah armed with shoulder-fired missiles were responsible. The Saudi Al-Arabiya and Kuwaiti Al-Seyassah news networks noted that a group of Hezbollah fighters from Lebanon was killed or captured by Yemeni forces.

The official Yemen News Agency reported more heavy fighting in Sa'dah on 9 October, with Houthis launching suicide attacks and gaining some territory before government forces gained the upper hand, killing 100 and wounding more than 280 people. Dozens more casualties were reported in the following days. In the offensive's tenth week, the rebels captured a military base near the Saudi border in the Razeh district of Sa'dah governorate. The fighters also seized a military center, a government building, and even Razeh's airport.

The month of October saw the involvement of Somali forces alongside the Houthis. Some 200 Somali recruits arrived on boats via the Red Sea and were mainly sent on suicide missions against government and military targets in Saada City. Yemen would later claim to have captured 28 Somali troops. Other sources indicated that Somali fighters were used to dig trenches to hide ammunition and launch ambushes from the mountains. By December, a Somali diplomat claimed that many Somali refugees faced abduction by the Houthis as they fled into Saudi Arabia. Those who refused faced execution.

=== Saudi incursion ===
By early November, the rebels stated that Saudi Arabia was permitting Yemeni army units to launch attacks across the border from a base in Jabal al-Dukhan, which the Yemeni government later denied. The conflict spilled into the neighboring Saudi Arabia on 3 November 2009 when a Saudi border patrol was ambushed in a cross-border attack, killing one soldier and wounding eleven more. The Kingdom's news agency later added that a second soldier died from injuries suffered during the fight.

Following the cross-border ambush on 3 November, Saudi Arabia responded by moving troops to the border and striking Houthi positions on 5 November 2009, using F-15 and Tornado jets. Saudi Arabia denied hitting any targets inside Yemen, but it was reported that six Yemeni locations suffered rocket attacks, one of which received 100 rockets in one hour. Residents of the coastal city of Jizan reported hearing fighter jets and seeing armored convoys move towards the border. The city's King Fahd Hospital was also placed on alert for treating military casualties. A Saudi government adviser later said no decision had yet been taken to send troops across the border, but made clear Riyadh was no longer prepared to tolerate the Yemeni rebels.

By 8 November 2009, Saudi Arabia confirmed that it had entered the fray, claiming to have "regained control" of the Jabal al-Dukhan mountain from the rebels. Around this time, Jordanian commandos, who had arrived in Saudi camps a few days prior, backed up Saudi forces in efforts to take Al-Dukhan mountain. The Jordanians reportedly sustained casualties in the attacks.

As the war extended into December, reports indicated that Moroccan special forces had joined the 2,000 Jordanian commandos on the ground. Clashes continued throughout the month of December along the border. As the fighting extended into January, Samira al-Madani became the first female journalist in Saudi Arabian history to report from the battlefield near the border. She also interviewed several soldiers and Prince Gazan Mohamed bin Nasser bin Abdul Aziz, who briefed her on the situation.

=== Truce attempts ===
The Yemeni government launched a direct attack into Saada on 7 December 2009. Forces attacked the barricaded strongholds of the city hoping to end the battle quickly and decisively. Fighting continued past 11 December 2009 with Houthi forces still holding out in barricaded houses of the Old City. The battle for the city appeared to have ended following the arrest of some 200 fighters after a week and a half of fighting. Abdul Malik al-Houthi reportedly suffered injuries during the fighting, but managed to escape to safety as Yemeni forces continued to engage rebels throughout the province.

By 1 January 2010, Yemen's Higher Security Committee proposed a ceasefire, which was rejected.

Houthi leader Abdul Malek al-Houthi said they would stop fighting to prevent further civilian casualties and suggested the withdrawal was a gesture for peace. Saudi General Said Al-Ghamdi confirmed that the Houthis had ceased fire as a result of the determined Saudi assault. Prince Khalid bin Sultan announced that the Houthis were defeated though did not declare an end to the Saudi bombing campaign, aimed at preventing any future incursions into the Kingdom.

On 30 January 2010, Houthi rebels appeared to have accepted the Yemeni government truce offer.

=== Clashes continue ===
Following the truce, the Houthis claimed that Saudis continued with air and missile attacks. The situation deteriorated on 31 January 2010 after the Yemeni government turned down a truce offer by the Houthis. Made by Abdel-Malik al-Houthi, the offer was rejected because he demanded that the government end its military operations first. Yemen continued with the military offensive, killing 12 Houthis in the process.

Early February saw a new round of attacks by Yemeni forces on Sa'ada. Saudi Arabia also rejoined the fight with air raids. On 5 February 2010, the Yemeni court sentenced Yayha Al-Houthi, the brother of the Houthis' leader Abdul-Malek Al-Houthi, to 15 years imprisonment. The Yemeni MP was tried in absentia due to his involvement in the Shia insurgency.

On 6 February 2010, the Houthis renewed their attacks against the Yemeni government, killing 15 Yemeni soldiers in an ambush in Wadi Al-Jabara district and killing 8 soldiers during street battles in Sa'dah city that day. The same day, Saudi air raids destroyed four civilian residences and injured two women. The Saudi military fired 174 rockets and mortars at the rebel controlled Al-Dhaher, Qamamat, Ghafereh, Al-Rammadiat and Shada districts.

The last round of skirmishes occurred on 11 February 2010 with five soldiers and thirteen rebels dying in the Amran governorate. Fighting also continued in Sa'dah city and killed seven soldiers and eleven rebels. Houthis repulsed an attempted army infiltration in the Al-Aqab district killing an unspecified number of Yemeni soldiers. Meanwhile, Saudis carried out 13 air raids on the Harf Sufyan, Jouan and Jebel Talan districts.

=== Inside Saada City ===
During the fighting, roughly 20,000 refugees fled to the provincial capital. The increase in population forced residents to share houses with refugees, along with food and water. Street fights and the continual breaking of ceasefires posed many problems for civilians, along with hot days and rainy nights. Mobile phone networks were cut off during the beginning of war, making it nearly impossible to communicate with the outside world. United Nations aide workers were forced to pull out, but a few remained, often finding themselves pinned down in their homes.

Government operations were concentrated primarily in the northern parts of the Old City, including the residential neighborhoods of Al-Rout, Al-Shaab, Al-Jarba, Al-Toot, and Bab Najran. The Bab Najran neighborhood in particular was cited as a main rebel stronghold and suffered frequent shelling from tanks and artillery. Houthi sources claimed that government forces used bulldozers to clear houses and other rebel positions during operations.

A letter from a worker with the Islamic Relief organization provided a detailed account from the ground. Schools became refugee collection centers and prices were hiked due to the closures of shops and businesses. Mortars, gunmen, and a government-imposed curfew hindered the efforts of refugees and aid workers to travel freely. Since the only hospital was located in the bombarded Old City, aid groups within Saada became the only source of the population's limited food, water, and improvised shelter.

=== Truce ===
On 12 February 2010, the Houthis accepted the government's ceasefire proposal.

A Yemeni general claimed the Houthis violated the ceasefire on the same day, claiming that four soldiers were killed in two districts while adding that an attempt was made to assassinate him. The Houthis denied responsibility for this attack. As the remainder of February progressed, it became clear that the fighting had ended. By the 25th, reports indicated that the Houthis, under the conditions that they would remain masked and would not be followed, had agreed to leave their final positions in northern Saada City. Yemeni engineers then cleared homes from mines and booby traps. A United Nations team, including a representative of the UNHCR, was finally allowed into Saada City and surrounding refugee camps in April 2010.

== Casualties ==
=== Death toll ===
As the name of the operation implied, the government used scorched earth tactics and the military was given orders to destroy all civilian and military infrastructure that could be used by the Houthis in violation of the Geneva Convention of warfare. The exact breakdown of the casualties is unknown as neither side has released any casualty figures. However, official news reports on 6 February 2010 claimed that the Yemeni government suffered at least 126 casualties, including 19 tribal fighters, two generals, Sa'dah's regional security chief and three security guards. The Yemeni government claimed to have killed 600 Houthi fighters in the first two months of the offensive, although this cannot be verified.

On 23 January 2010, the Saudi government released new figures confirming 133 soldiers had been killed and six were still missing.

=== Refugee crisis ===
Upon the onset of the conflict, camps were set up along the border area between Yemen and Saudi Arabia. Other camps and settlements were dispersed throughout the Hajjah, Amran, and Al-Jawf provinces. Aid agencies tried organizing routes through Saudi Arabia, since domestic roads into the country were generally off limits. The International Committee of the Red Cross and the Yemen Red Crescent Society sponsored four camps for internally displaced persons on the outskirts of and within the city, but one had to be dismantled and the refugees moved after being caught in crossfire. Prior to the war, an estimated 120,000 were already displaced as a result of the four previous wars.

The northwestern village of Al-Mazrak became the main collection center for refugees with three camps set up for 23,000 displaced persons and 70,000 more outside the camp. UNICEF played a major role in creating educational environments for children and finding and hiring instructors. The village was home to the only camp that was open to United Nations workers during the war.

== International tensions ==
The conflict took international dimension in late October 2009 with clashes between the Houthis and Saudi security forces near the border. Since the beginning of the operation, the Houthis accused Saudi Arabia of supporting the Yemeni government and conducting bombing raids into Yemen. Prior to this, Yemeni President Ali Abdullah Saleh held talks in the Moroccan city of Agadir with Saudi Crown Prince Sultan bin Abdul Aziz Al Saud and King Abdullah II of Jordan. Saudi Arabia, Jordan, and Morocco would later play roles in the fight against the Houthis. Morocco, which had severed ties with Iran in March of that year, noted that Tehran's alleged backing of the Houthis helped in the decision to later send troops.

Around this period, Yemeni officials claimed to have captured a boat in the Red Sea that was transporting anti-tank shells. Five Iranian "instructors" were also captured. Various official Iranian sources responded, calling it a politically motivated fabrication and stating that the ship was traveling for business activities and was carrying no consignment. In Saana, the government shut down an Iranian sponsored hospital after suspicions that the staff, which included eight Iranians, were providing aid to the rebels. Government officials claimed that hospital services were closed down due to a delay in rent payments, but security surrounded and blocked off patients from receiving aid. As the Hajj approached during the month of November, Iranian President Mahmoud Ahmadinejad noted that "appropriate measures" would be taken in case Iranian pilgrims faced restrictions.

On 13 November 2009, the Iranian group Society of Seminary Teachers of Qom denounced the Yemeni and Saudi offensives against the Houthis. Two days later, Iranian Speaker of Parliament Ali Larijani accused the United States of cooperating with the Saudi campaign. A few days later, Iran announced plans to send warships to the Gulf of Aden as a means of protecting trade routes against Somali pirates. This move coincided with the Saudi naval blockade in the Red Sea to stop arms shipments allegedly from Tehran and Eritrea to the Houthis. Three Saudi warships with marine commandos from the Yanbu naval base patrolled the waters off the coast of northern Yemen.

== See also ==
- List of modern conflicts in the Middle East
