= Geosectarianism =

Geosectarianism is a term coined by Kamran Bokhari, one of the world's renowned authorities on the geopolitics of the Middle East and South Asia. Geosectarianism refers to the main intra-Muslim struggle between the Sunni and Shi'a camps on a regional scale. Rooted in a religious schism in contemporary times, it has taken on a strong ethnic dimension. Saudi Arabia leads the largely Arab Sunni camp, which is engaged in a struggle to counter a rising Iran; the latter heads a bloc of Shi'a state and non-state actors (Iraq, Syria, Hezbollah, and the al-Houthi movement). Iraq, Syria, Lebanon, Yemen, Bahrain, and northeastern Saudi Arabia are its key geopolitical battlespaces.
