= Assassination of Thabet Gawas =

2022 murder in Aden, Yemen

- Part of Yemeni Civil War (2014-present)
- Location: Dar Sad District, Aden, Yemen
- Date: March 23, 2022
- Target: Brigadier General Thabet Gawas
- Victim: 4
- Perpetrator: Houthis

On March 23, 2022, Houthis assassinated Yemeni army commander Thabet Gawas and three others in a car bombing in Aden, Yemen.

== Prelude ==
Since 2014, the Yemeni government led by Abdrabbuh Mansur Hadi has been fighting a civil war against the predominantly Shia Houthis, who control the capital of Sanaa. The Yemeni government has since been headquartered in the southern city of Aden, although most of the city is controlled by the Southern Transitional Council. Thabet Gawas was a Yemeni commander of the 15th Infantry Brigade based in Houthi-controlled Saada, and was known for his extremely staunch position against the Houthis, being referred to as "Terrorizer of the Houthis." Gawas also participated in the battle that killed Hussein al-Houthi, the founder of the Houthi movement. As a result, he was considered a priority target for Houthis. In 2020, Gawas took part in the Abyan campaign in late 2020 against the Houthis. Later, Gawas commanded the 131st Infantry Brigade and the Al-Anad axis militia.

Prior to the assassination of Gawas, several other Yemeni commanders were assassinated in Yemen. Gawas had also survived several assassination attempts in previous years.

== Attack ==
At the time of the attack, Gawas was traveling with three others, including his son and nephew, near a security checkpoint in Green City, a suburb of Dar Sad District, north of Aden. Yemeni media reported that Gawas was returning from a funeral of one of his friends. The bombing was carried out by an explosive-laden Hyundai Tucson, which was parked at the security checkpoint and detonated as Gawas's convoy passed by. The bombing was first announced in a Telegram post by President Hadi, mourning Gawas. No one initially claimed responsibility for the attack.

== Aftermath ==
Abdul Wahab al-Ansi, the secretary-general of the Yemeni Islah Party, sent his condolences to Gawas' son, Ahmed Thabet Gawas. Several other Yemeni generals expressed their condolences. The Yemeni Minister of Information, Muammar al-Eryani, stated that while the attacks "bore the hallmark of Al-Qaeda and ISIS", the attack could have also been perpetrated by the Houthis. Houthi commander Abdul Qadir al-Murtada celebrated the killing of Gawas. Later, Houthis admitted that pro-Houthi cells in southern Yemen carried out the attack.

Gawas was buried in Radfan, Lahij Governorate, on March 25, 2022.
