= Jabal al-Dukhan =

Saudi Arabian mountain

Jabal al-Dukhan (Arabic:جبل دخان) (Arabic: "smoke mountain") is a mountain located in Saudi territory southwest of the village of Al Khubah in Jizan Province, which borders the Jabal Dukhan path of the Saudi Arabia–Yemen border between from the south-east and the length of the mountain and his 7x7 kilometers and reaches an elevation of the mountain from the sea about 500 meters from the sea and rises out of place 250 meters.

In 2009 it was the location of fighting between Saudi forces and the Houthis during Operation Scorched Earth.
