= Yemeni crisis =

Ongoing crisis occurring in the country of Yemen

- Part of the Arab Spring, Arab Winter, Iran–Saudi Arabia proxy war and Middle Eastern crisis (2023–present)
- Current military situation in the Yemeni civil war. Yemeni government led by the Presidential Leadership Council (PLC) (since 2022) Supreme Political Council (SPC) of the Houthi (since 2016) Al-Qaeda in the Arabian Peninsula (AQAP) (since 2009)
Date	27 January 2011 – present (12 years, 9 months, 3 weeks and 1 day)
Location	Yemen
Status	Ongoing

Belligerents
- Full list of armed factions

Casualties and losses
- Total killed: 377,000+ deaths

The Yemeni crisis began with the 2011–2012 revolution against President Abdullah Saleh, who had led Yemen for 33 years. After Saleh left office in early 2012 as part of a mediated agreement between the Yemeni government and opposition groups, the government led by Saleh's former vice president, Abdrabbuh Mansur Hadi, faced challenges in governing Yemen’s divided political landscape and addressing armed opposition from Southern movement, Al-Qaeda in the Arabian Peninsula and the Houthi militant movement that had been waging a protracted insurgency in the north for years.

In September 2014, the conflict escalated into a civil war when Houthi forces entered the capital of Sanaa and forced Hadi to negotiate a "unity government" with other political factions. The Houthis continued their advance and influence over government operations until, after forces aligned with the Houthis reportedly attacked his presidential palace and private residence, Hadi resigned along with his ministers in January 2015.

The following month, the Houthis declared themselves in control of the Yemeni government, dissolving the Parliament, and installing an interim Revolutionary Committee led by Mohammed al-Houthi, a cousin of Houthi leader Abdul-Malik al-Houthi. Hadi escaped to Aden, where he declared that he remained Yemen's legitimate president, proclaimed the country's temporary capital, and called on loyal government officials and members of the military to rally to him.

Beginning in 2017 the separatist Southern Transitional Council (STC) began fighting against the government. In 2019 the STC signed a ceasefire with the government, with sporadic clashes. In 2022, the Presidential Leadership Council (PLC) was formed following Hadi's resignation. In December, 2025 the STC launched an offensive across southern Yemen. Following the offensive, the STC announced a constitution for an independent southern Yemeni state. Following this, the PLC launched a Saudi-backed counteroffensive the STC fractured, with some leaders declaring the group to be dissolved. As of August 2026, the PLC remains the internationally recognized government of Yemen, while the Houthis control much of the country, including the de jure capital of Sanaa. 2026 Yemen offensives begin in September 2026, ending the 2022 truce.

== Background ==
The wave of protests known as the Arab Spring did not take long to arrive in Yemen after the Tunisian revolution (2011–2012). Yemen was one of the poorest countries in the region. Its government faced widespread allegations of corruption, with a large amount of weapons in private hands. By 2011, the country was already facing challenges from al Qaeda-linked militants and separatists in the south and Zaydī Shīʿa Muslim rebels in the north. Yemen had only been unified since 1990, and deep divisions persisted between the north and south.

=== Ecological crisis ===
Yemen's political instability has been compounded and partly caused by the severe ecological crisis in the country. As of 2023, the average Yemeni has access to only 86 m^{3} of renewable freshwater per year for all uses, (62 gallons per day) compared to a Middle Eastern regional average of approximately 631 m^{3}, both of which are significantly below the internationally defined threshold for water stress of 1,700 m^{3} per capita per year. Yemen's groundwater is the main source of water in the country but the water tables have dropped severely, leaving the country without a viable source of water. For example, in Sanaa, the water table was 30 meters below surface in the 1970s but had dropped to 1200 meters below surface by 2012. The groundwater has not been regulated by Yemen's governments.

Even before the revolution, Yemen's water situation had been described as increasingly dire with some environmental analysts warning that Yemen could be among the first countries to face extreme water scarcity if current trends continue. Agriculture in Yemen takes up about 90% of water in Yemen even though it only generates 6% of GDP - however a large portion of Yemenis are dependent on small-scale subsistence agriculture. Half of agricultural water in Yemen is used to grow khat, a narcotic that most Yemenis chew. This means that in such a water-scarce country as Yemen, where half the population is food-insecure, 45% of the water withdrawn from the ever-depleting aquifers is used to grow a crop that feeds nobody.

This water insecurity has a direct impact on political stability. Outsiders hear most about the proxy war between factions supported by other countries, but according to the Yemeni newspaper Al-Thawra, 70% to 80% of conflicts in the country's rural regions are water-related. The country's Interior Ministry has estimated that across the country, water and land related disputes kill 4,000 people a year - more than terrorism. In Al-Jawf Governorate, a dispute over a well's placement has led to a blood feud that has continued for more than 30 years

In 2007, Yemen's minister of Water and Natural Resources suggested that Sanaa, the capital city, might have to be evacuated if it runs out of water. Although the government was unable to move the capital in an orderly and peaceful way, the war and political crisis have rendered Sanaa and most of Yemen into a battleground that people have been forced to flee.

Additional environmental catastrophes have battered Yemen as the war has progressed. In late 2015, two historic cyclones struck the country. The first of these, Cyclone Chapala, struck the island of Socotra before hitting the port of Mukalla on Yemen's south coast, where it caused catastrophic flash flooding. This storm, combined with the following Cyclone Megh, left enough moisture in the soil for locusts to breed. These locusts can fly 100 miles in a day and destroy any crop they encounter.

== History ==
=== Revolution (2011–12) ===
Yemen's political crisis began in 2011, amid the Arab Spring and the ongoing Houthi insurgency, South Yemen insurgency, and the Al-Qaeda insurgency in Yemen.

==== Protests against Saleh ====
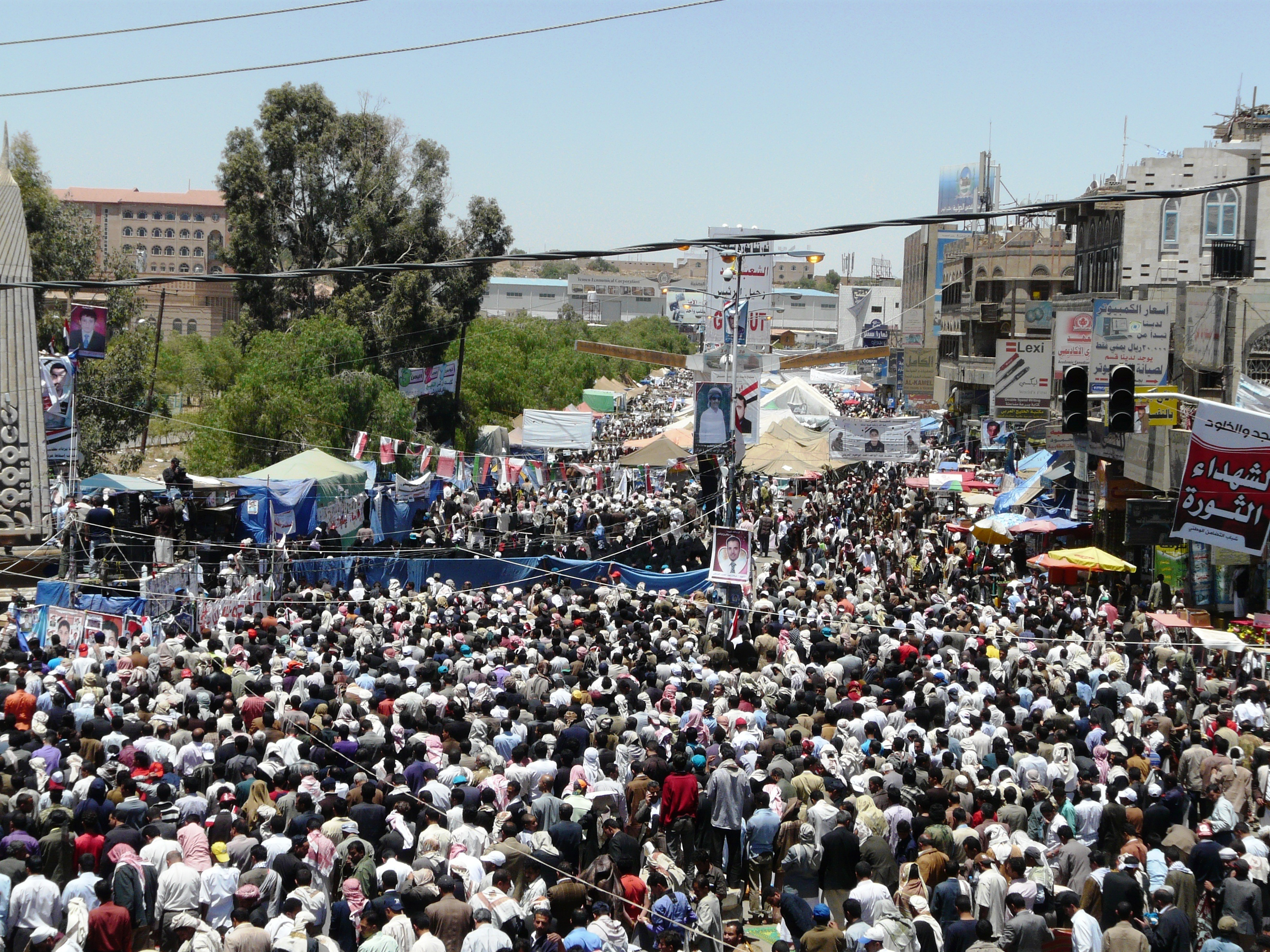
Protesters in Sanaa on 4 April 2011, during the early stages of the Yemeni Revolution.

Popular protests broke out in early 2011, led by both secular and Islamist opposition groups. Longtime rebel groups like the Houthis and the Southern Movement also participated in the protests. Saleh responded with a violent crackdown, and the country nearly disintegrated into an all-out civil war as several army elements broke with the government and joined the protesters, beginning in March.

Saleh was almost killed when a bomb went off in a mosque where he and other top government officials were praying on 3 June, apparently in an assassination attempt. While his condition initially appeared grave, Saleh recovered and returned to work on 23 September after several months of medical treatment in Saudi Arabia. He left Vice President Hadi in charge during his absence. As acting president, Hadi met with the opposition and reportedly expressed openness to political reforms. However, he rejected the idea of forcing Saleh from power without the president's consent.

==== Deal brokered ====
The Gulf Co-operation Council applied no small amount of pressure on Saleh to negotiate an end to the uprising by stepping down. Weeks after returning from Saudi Arabia, Saleh finally agreed on 23 November to resign in exchange for immunity. As part of the deal, the opposition agreed to allow Hadi to stand unopposed for the presidency in 2012.

==== Siege of Dammaj ====
Meanwhile, the insurgent Houthis in northern Yemen laid siege to a Salafi town in Saada Governorate, Dammaj. Fighting was worst in November and December. The Yemeni military was unable to restore order due to the crisis elsewhere in the country.

=== Transitional period (2012–14) ===
The Yemeni Revolution came to an apparently successful conclusion in 2012 for the opposition, as Saleh left office. However, unrest continued in both northern and southern Yemen.

==== Election of Hadi ====
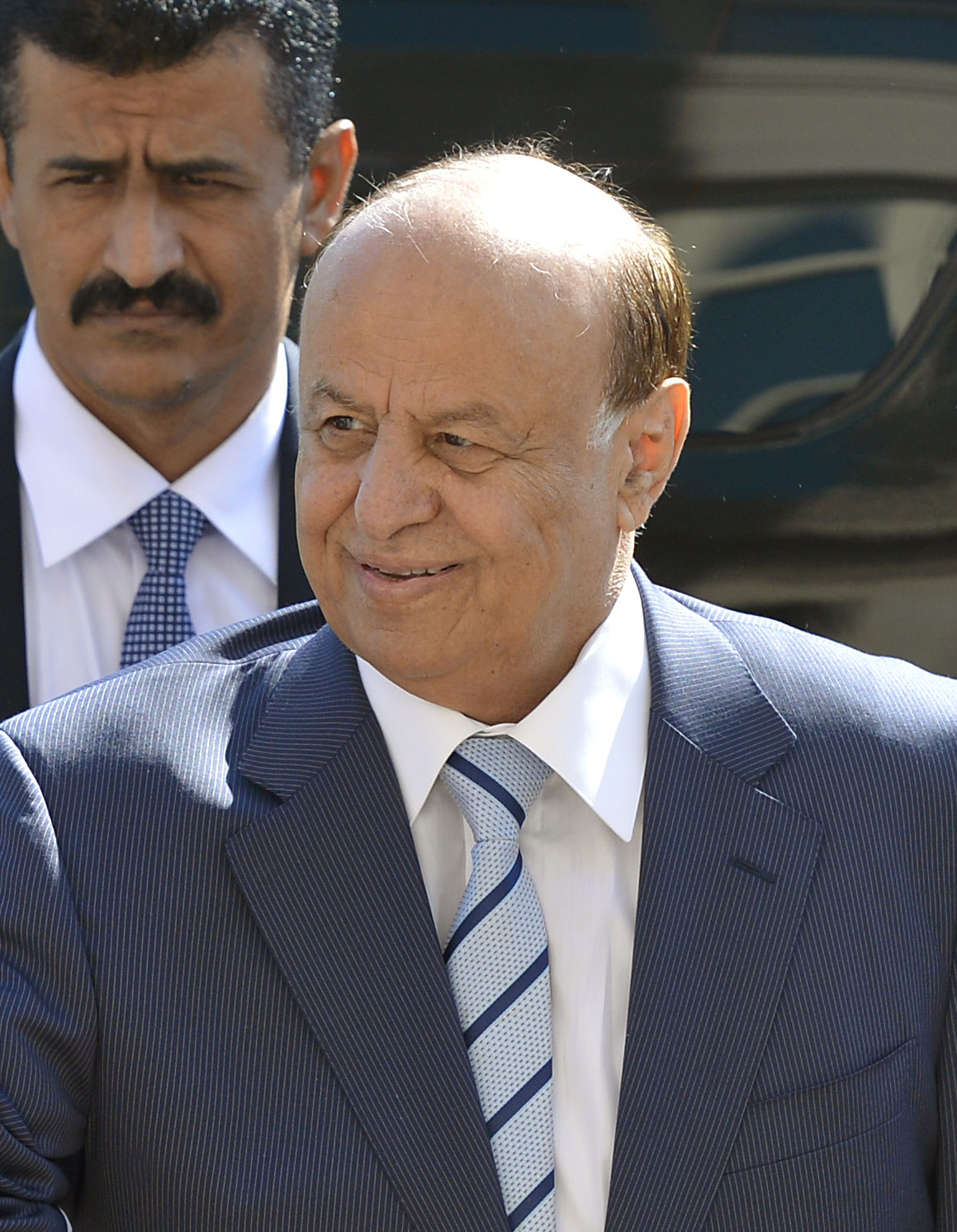
Abdrabbuh Mansur Hadi, the second President of Yemen.

Hadi's election on 24 February 2012 peacefully introduced a new government in Yemen, with only a small percentage of voters spoiling their ballots in the single-candidate contest. Hadi, a southerner, especially enjoyed support in former South Yemen, quieting the murmurs of separatism, although the Southern Movement boycotted the presidential election, as did the Houthis. Hadi did not give the restive Houthis any seats in his cabinet.

==== Dammaj clashes continue ====
The conflict in Dammaj was renewed in April when fighting broke out between Houthi tribesmen and Salafi students. Both sides accused the other of breaking a truce agreement.

==== Hadi makes inroads ====
National reconciliation talks were held with the participation of many separatist elements, as well as the Houthis.

Nine years after the death of Hussein Badreddin al-Houthi, the Yemeni government turned over the remains of the Houthi patriarch to his family and he was buried in northern Yemen in June 2013, with a representative of the Hadi administration in attendance.

Hadi visited the United States, a key overseas ally, in July 2013. The U.S. also lifted a ban on transferring detainees from its Guantanamo Bay detention camp in Cuba to Yemen.

Meanwhile, Saudi Arabia deported as many as 300,000 to 400,000 Yemeni migrant workers to their home country during 2013, causing an influx of poor, landless Yemenis into northern Yemen.

==== Renewed clashes ====
The conflict between Houthis and Salafis in Saada Governorate was renewed in October and November. Saada government officials accused Houthi fighters of attacking a Salafi mosque in Dammaj in an attempt to drive the Sunnis out, while the Houthis accused the Salafis of using the religious institute as a staging ground for foreign Sunni fighters. The government attempted to intervene to stop the fighting.

Sectarian fighting in Al Jawf Governorate lasted throughout the year. Dhamar Governorate also saw clashes between the Houthis and Salafis toward the end of the year.

==== Shia–Sunni conflict spreads ====
Clashes in Dammaj spread to the Amran Governorate by January 2014. The Houthis achieved victory in Saada when the Yemeni government brokered a deal under which Salafi fighters and their families were evacuated to the neighboring Al Hudaydah Governorate. According to reports, the Houthis then blocked government troops from fully deploying throughout the territory, in spite of a signed agreement.

Fighting in the Amran Governorate intensified during the year, with clashes between Houthis and supporters of the Islamist Islah Party eventually leading to a Houthi takeover of the entire governorate. The conflict spread to the Sanaa Governorate by July.

==== Houthis take Sanaa ====
The Houthis began protesting against Hadi's government to demand concessions in order to resolve a years-long insurgency they had been waging against the Yemeni state in mid-2014. The uprising escalated dramatically as Houthi fighters swept into Sanaa, the capital, and effectively seized control of the city from the Yemeni military within a couple of days in September. The forces of General Ali Mohsen al-Ahmer surrendered to the Houthis after a brief fight.

Ali Abdullah Saleh, the former president, was widely suspected of aiding the Houthis behind the scenes and helping pave the way for their takeover. Prime Minister Mohammed Basindawa resigned on 21 September as part of a deal meant to end the standoff.

==== Unity government formed ====
The Houthis and the government agreed on 21 September to form a "unity government" within one month. However, the Houthis rejected Hadi's original choice of prime minister, Ahmad Awad bin Mubarak, and Oil Minister Khaled Bahah was appointed instead with the armed group's approval. The Houthis and the General People's Congress led by Saleh announced abruptly on 8 November that they would not participate in the unity government, claiming it was unacceptable to them. The boycott prompted sanctions against Saleh and senior Houthi leaders from the United Nations Security Council and the United States Department of the Treasury.

=== War in Yemen (2014–present) ===
Yemen was riven in 2015, with the Houthis establishing a new government in Sanaa and Hadi retreating with his supporters to Aden, and later Saudi Arabia. The Arab League, led by the Saudis, began a bombing campaign and mobilization of various armed forces in the region for a possible invasion.

==== Houthis consolidate power ====
A Houthi official announces the dissolution of House of Representatives and the formation of a Houthi-led transitional authority on 6 February 2015.

The Houthis stepped up their pressure on Hadi's weakened government, seizing the presidential palace and strategic military installations in Sanaa and shelling the president's private residence on 20 January. The following day, they took control of Hadi's home, stationing armed guards outside to keep him under virtual house arrest.

Hadi, Prime Minister Khaled Bahah, and the cabinet resigned the following day, saying they could not continue to work under the conditions the Houthis had imposed. The rebel group welcomed Hadi's resignation, but continued to keep him under house arrest. The news prompted four southern governorates to announce they would disregard all orders from Sanaa.

The House of Representatives was to meet on 25 January to discuss whether to accept or reject Hadi's resignation under the Yemeni constitution, but the session was cancelled after the Houthis took control of the parliament building. The United Nations stepped in to attempt a negotiated resolution to what many in Yemen regarded as a Houthi coup.

UN negotiations were fruitless, and a Houthi ultimatum to Yemen's political factions to find a solution was not met. On 6 February, the Houthis declared themselves in total control of the Yemeni government, dissolving parliament and installing a Revolutionary Committee led by Mohammed Ali al-Houthi to lead the state in an interim capacity. The announcement sparked protests in Sanaa and other cities, especially in the south.

==== Post-coup developments ====
Reactions to the Houthi takeover were broadly negative, with the Arab League, Gulf Cooperation Council, United Nations, and United States refusing to recognise the "constitutional declaration" and several governorates rejecting the Houthis' authority. With most political parties criticising the coup, Jamal Benomar, the UN envoy to Yemen, announced a resumption of national talks over the future of Yemen on 8 February. Benomar said the Houthis had agreed to participate in the talks. UN Secretary-General Ban Ki-moon called for Hadi to be reinstated as president.

The Houthis and other factions reached a tentative agreement, announced on 20 February, to keep the House of Representatives in place despite the "constitutional declaration" dissolving it two weeks prior. The agreement also stipulated that a "people's transitional council" would be established to represent southerners, women, youth, and other political minorities. The next day, Hadi traveled to Aden, where he said all Houthi-directed actions since 21 September 2014 were invalid, and condemned the coup d'état.

==== Civil war erupts ====
Fighting broke out over Aden International Airport on 19 March, with special forces loyal to ex-president Ali Abdullah Saleh attempting to seize the airport before they were defeated by troops and militiamen under orders from the Hadi administration. The following day, in an apparently unrelated incident, four suicide bombers detonated themselves in Sanaa mosques packed with Houthi congregants, killing at least 142. The Sunni Islamist group Islamic State of Iraq and the Levant's Yemen branch claimed responsibility.

Hadi declared Aden to be Yemen's temporary capital on 21 March while Sanaa remains under Houthi control. The next day, Houthi forces advanced toward Aden, capturing key parts of Yemen's third-largest city, Taiz. They consolidated their grip on much of the south and seized much of Aden itself by early April.

==== Saudi Arabian-led intervention in Yemen ====
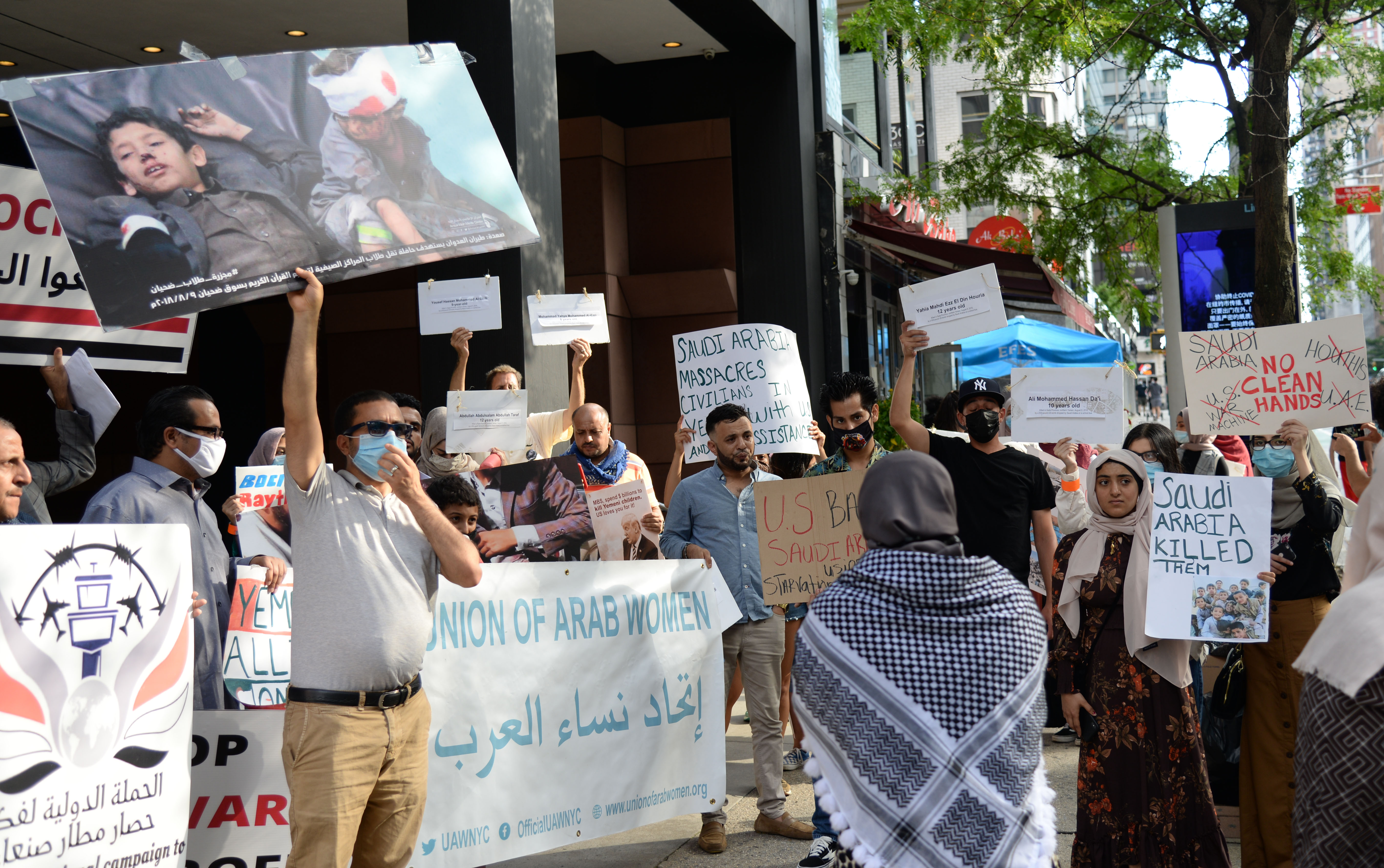
Protest against the Saudi-led intervention and blockade of Houthi-controlled areas of Yemen, New York City, 14 August 2020

On 26 March 2015, Saudi Arabia and several other countries announced that they had begun military operations in Yemen against Houthi rebels. Bahrain, Kuwait, Qatar and the United Arab Emirates issued a statement along with Saudi Arabia saying their goal is to "repel Houthi aggression" in Yemen. Egypt, Jordan, Morocco, and Sudan are also members of the coalition.

In addition to airstrikes against targets throughout Yemen, which the General People's Congress blamed for causing dozens of civilian casualties, Egyptian warships reportedly shelled a Houthi column as it advanced toward Aden on 30 March, and Saudi and Houthi forces traded artillery and rocket fire across the border between Saudi Arabia and Yemen.

The 8 October 2016 attack by the Saudi Arabian-led coalition killed at least 140 people and injured more than 600 in Sanaa. This was one of the single worst death tolls in the two-year war. Saudi Arabia and its allies accepted the internal review's finding, by the Joint Incidents Assessment Team (JIAT), that the coalition's bombardment of this funeral ceremony was based on faulty information, i.e., that this was a gathering of armed Houthi leaders.

the conflict settled into a protracted stalemate characterized by regional fragmentation, including the assassination of former president Ali Abdullah Saleh in 2017 following the fracturing of his alliance with the Houthis.

As the Southern Transitional Council, supported by the United Arab Emirates, fought for control of the south, internal divisions within the anti-Houthi camp also grew. Broader fighting continued despite UN-backed initiatives like the 2018 Stockholm Agreement, which sought to reduce local tensions surrounding Hudaydah.

In April 2022, Hadi resigned and handed over power to the newly established Presidential Leadership Council, led by Rashad al-Alimi, as part of a UN-brokered truce. Backchannel negotiations persisted until late 2023, when the Houthis launched shipping attacks in the Red Sea and Bab-el-Mandeb strait due to the start of the Gaza war, even though the official truce had lapsed. The United States, the United Kingdom, and Israel launched retaliatory strikes in 2024 and 2025 as a result of the wider Red Sea crisis. After regional diplomatic changes in late 2025, ceasefires eventually reduced maritime and U.S.-Houthi clashes.

On 2 December 2025, the Southern Transitional Council (STC) launched a large-scale offensive with a force of 10,000 fighters against Yemeni government positions in the Hadhramaut Governorate, eventually expanding into the Al-Mahrah Governorate and other adjacent governorates. By 8 December, STC forces had seized control of nearly all the governorates that were once part of South Yemen, in addition to Dhale Governorate, including the entire southern coastline of Yemen, the border region with Oman, and the oil fields in Hadhramaut Governorate. The STC claimed control over all 8 governorates by 9 December. By 9 December, STC forces were estimated to control 90–95% of the populated areas in the former South Yemen, in addition to holding at least 80% of Yemen's proven oil reserves. Of all the regions seized by the STC, the Hadhramaut Governorate was the most strategically valuable one by far. This was seen as marking a major victory for the UAE, and a significant setback for Saudi ambitions in the region, as it could have provided the conditions for the STC eventually declaring the secession of southern Yemen.

During the offensive, Saudi Arabia withdrew its remaining forces from Aden and Aden International Airport.

==== STC offensive and PLC counter-offensive ====
On 2 December 2025, the Southern Transitional Council (STC) launched a large-scale offensive with a force of 10,000 fighters against Yemeni government positions in the Hadhramaut Governorate, eventually expanding into the Al-Mahrah Governorate and other adjacent governorates. By 8 December, STC forces had seized control of nearly all the governorates that were once part of South Yemen, in addition to Dhale Governorate, including the entire southern coastline of Yemen, the border region with Oman, and the oil fields in Hadhramaut Governorate. The STC claimed control over all 8 governorates by 9 December. By 9 December, STC forces were estimated to control 90–95% of the populated areas in the former South Yemen, in addition to holding at least 80% of Yemen's proven oil reserves. Of all the regions seized by the STC, the Hadhramaut Governorate was the most strategically valuable one by far. This was seen as marking a major victory for the UAE, and a significant setback for Saudi ambitions in the region, as it could have provided the conditions for the STC eventually declaring the secession of southern Yemen.

During the offensive, Saudi Arabia withdrew its remaining forces from Aden and Aden International Airport.

Tensions escalated further in late December. Saudi Arabia demanded STC withdrawal from the seized territories and conducted airstrikes on STC positions starting 26 December, including reported strikes in Wadi Nahb (Hadhramaut) and later on a port shipment in Mukalla alleged to contain UAE-supplied weapons. On 30 December 2025, the PLC government, backed by Saudi Arabia, declared a 90-day state of emergency across Yemen, canceled a joint defense agreement with the United Arab Emirates (UAE), ordered the withdrawal of all remaining UAE forces within 24 hours, and imposed a temporary blockade on entry points. The UAE subsequently announced the full withdrawal of its remaining counterterrorism personnel from Yemen, effectively ending its direct military presence and marking a de facto removal from the Saudi-led coalition's operations in the country.

On 30 December, the Royal Saudi Air Force carried out airstrikes on the STC-controlled port city of Mukalla, targeting what it said was a shipment of weapons that had arrived from the UAE. The UAE denied that the shipments contained weapons. Shortly afterward, the internationally recognized Yemeni government ordered all UAE forces to leave Yemeni territory within 24 hours, announced a 72-hour air, land, and sea blockade, and declared a 90-day state of emergency. Later that day, the UAE announced it would voluntarily withdraw its remaining forces from Yemen following the Saudi strikes.

On 2 January 2026, Yemeni government forces, supported by Saudi airstrikes, launched a counteroffensive to retake the territories captured by the STC. The STC later announced plans to hold an independence referendum within two years. Backed by Saudi Arabia, government forces advanced rapidly, capturing Seiyun on 3 January and Mukalla the following day, reversing the STC gains. On 7 January, government forces began entering the STC's capital, Aden, amid the collapse of STC resistance. Subsequently, STC leader Aidarus al-Zoubaidi was removed from his position on the Yemeni Presidential Council, charged with treason, and later fled to the UAE. On 9 January, the STC announced its dissolution following widespread territorial losses across the country.

==== Involvement in the 2026 Iran war ====
Following the start of the Iran war in 2026, the Houthi movement and the Presidential Leadership Council (PLC), which is supported by Saudi Arabia, were incorporated into the larger theater of the conflict as the regional aspect of the conflict grew. By firing ballistic missiles against Israel in March 2026, the Houthis officially entered the regional conflict, shattering the relative peace upheld by the 2022 truce mediated by the United Nations.

By the middle of 2026, Houthi military strategy had significantly shifted toward regional maritime chokepoints due to external geopolitical pressures. In reaction to ongoing Saudi coalition actions, the Houthis declared in July 2026 that they would impose a strict naval blockade on Saudi Arabian ports and shipping that passes through the Strait of Bab el-Mandeb. A lightning ground offensive along the Red Sea coast that led to the capture of the strategically important port of Mokha was sparked by this strategic expansion, which combined local civil grievances with the larger strategic actions of the Iranian-aligned Axis of Resistance.

On July 13, 2026, an aircraft operated by Iran's Mahan Air—an airline subject to international sanctions for transporting weapons and Islamic Revolutionary Guard Corps (IRGC) personnel—attempted to finish an unauthorized flight to Sanaa Airport, which is under Houthi control, marking the height of the logistical and airspace escalation. The internationally recognized Yemeni government denied landing permission, and subsequent airstrikes damaged the runway to enforce the inspection mechanism, forcing the aircraft to divert and land in Hodeidah, a Houthi-held Red Sea port.

==== Renewed fighting (2026) ====
The relative calm that had been maintained since the 2022 United Nations-brokered truce was shattered when talks broke down, dragging Yemen back into active, all-out warfare. Following a Houthi attack on Saudi Arabia's Abha Airport, tensions reached a peak and there was a significant regional escalation. The Houthis quickly took control of Yemen's Red Sea coast and the vital Bab-el-Mandeb Strait after launching a massive, unanticipated general offensive in the coastal regions on September 3, 2026. Intense fighting broke out in several governorates, including Al-Bayda, Al-Hudaydah, Al-Jawf, Marib, and Taiz. Within the first month of the offensive, over 800 people were killed and a large number of civilians were displaced.

By late September and early October, Taiz became the center of the ground war as Houthi forces tried to encircle the city and cut off the last ground line of communication to the government seat in Aden. Yemeni government troops and local tribal coalitions put up a fierce, coordinated fight against Houthi advances that targeted the crucial road link via the Al-Safiyah junction and the areas surrounding Jabal Habashi. Yemeni military spokesperson Majed al-Nuzaili declared on 3 October, that government forces had conducted massive defensive counter-operations using aircraft, drones, and heavy artillery, resulting in the degradation of high-value logistical targets across frontline sectors and over 700 Houthi casualties.

The head of the internationally recognized Presidential Leadership Council (PLC), Rashad al-Alimi, formally announced the start of a full-scale military counteroffensive from Saudi Arabia on 4 October 2026. Al-Alimi described the operation as a "decisive phase" aimed at reclaiming all remaining Houthi-controlled territories and restoring state authority. Government troops successfully cut off Houthi supply routes and retook Dhubab, including its airport. After that, they completely re-secured the Bab al-Mandab Strait and recaptured Mokha, encircling hundreds of remaining Houthi fighters. Government forces advanced along the western coast and fought on the ground near Taiz, Marib, and the Houthi-held capital Sanaa with the help of Saudi airstrikes.

Cross-border warfare soon resulted from the fighting. In retaliation, the Houthis launched missiles and drones at a number of Saudi cities, focusing on civilian transportation hubs and energy infrastructure. On 11 October, they launched a significant attack on Riyadh's King Khalid International Airport, stopping airport operations. In an official briefing to the UN Security Council on 9 October 2026, Hans Grundberg, the UN Special Envoy to Yemen, declared that the country had essentially returned to "full-scale war," pointing out that since August, the renewed hostilities had already forced over 200,000 people to flee their homes.

Houthi rebels attacked the Al-Maashiq Palace complex in Aden, the temporary capital of the internationally recognized government, on 15 October 2026, using drones and missiles. Five people, including members of Prime Minister Shaya al-Zindani's security detail, were killed and sixteen others were injured in the attack, which involved five ballistic missiles hitting the compound.

At least 73 recruits were killed and over 200 others were injured when Houthi forces fired three ballistic missiles at the al-Alam military training camp in the Shabwa Governorate on 19 October 2026. The United Kingdom declared after the escalation that it would increase its military assistance to protect Saudi Arabia from Houthi drone and missile attacks.

In the northern Al-Jawf Governorate, strategic heights and weapons depots east of al-Hazm were successfully recaptured by the PLC 1st Emergency Brigade by late October, while defensive units repelled Houthi pushes on vital routes between Taiz and Lahj.

Over 300,000 civilians in western Yemen were displaced within two months as a result of the renewed fighting, according to the International Organization for Migration (IOM).

On 3 November, government forces extended their operations and advanced further into the nearby al-Dahida heights. A major escalation occurred across Yemen's northern front as troops, supported by combat drones and fighter jets, overran Houthi fortifications and took significant military equipment.

Yemeni government forces reported on 7 November, that they had conducted 875 strikes on Houthi positions, repelled attacks in Marib, advanced in the Al-Jawf Governorate, and neutralized about 130 fighters. At the same time, Houthi authorities reported that Saudi strikes killed at least 33 civilians, mostly women and children, and injured 39 others, including nine women and eight children in the village of al-Shariya near Sanaa. They also alleged that the strikes had targeted responding paramedics.

On 15 November, the government forces declared their withdrawal from Dhubab and areas overlooking the strategic Bab el-Mandeb Strait in western Taiz Governorate, announcing their redeployment to defend Aden, the government's temporary capital. The Presidential Leadership Council's six-week counteroffensive to drive the Houthis off the southern Red Sea coast essentially ended with the retreat, leaving the Houthis in control of the maritime corridor.

== Humanitarian situation ==
=== Humanitarian crisis ===
==== Scale of humanitarian crisis ====
The Yemeni civil war has been described as one of the world’s worst humanitarian crises. Out of a pre-war population of around thirty million, an estimated 23.4 million people now require humanitarian assistance, meaning that an 80 percent of Yemenis rely on some form of aid to survive. The conflict itself has also caused about 233,000 deaths, with half of them from indirect causes such as hunger and the collapse of health services, and 3.65 millions of displaced mostly within the country itself. Particularly alarming is the impact on Yemeni children, as nearly two million of them are considered acutely malnourished, and even more are living in areas classified under famine risk.

==== Food insecurity and famine ====
An estimated 90 percent of national Yemeni food consumption is dependent on imports, a factor that makes the country particularly vulnerable to trade disruptions, such as the one caused by the ongoing civil war. When trade flows were disrupted after 2015, this structural reliance rapidly translated into widespread food insecurity, with early UN assessments suggesting that two thirds of the population faced some degree of food shortage.

Subsequent analyses describe a population increasingly reliant on food aid because of a combination of factors: the uncontrolled inflation, the prolonged suspension of many public-sector salaries, and the naval controls and port inspections imposed by the Saudi-led coalition, which slow and reduce imports through the main Red Sea ports, all are frequently cited as important factors to the economic stagnation. Between January and November 2020, the average cost of meeting food requirements was estimated to have risen by about 16 percent, making basic needs harder to afford even where these were still available. Humanitarian organisations and UN officials have repeatedly warned that all these dynamics are “starving” Yemen and have placed the country in a situation which the UN Secretary-General defined as the worst famine seen globally in decades.

==== Water crisis ====
Access to safe drinking water and basic sanitation has deteriorated sharply over the course of the conflict. Studies link this to the bombing and the neglect of water networks and sewage infrastructure, together with the collapse of already fragile public utilities, which has left millions of people in the main cities without reliable and safe piped water or functioning wastewater treatment. In many towns and rural areas instead, families usually depend on groundwater pumped by diesel engines and on trucked water supplies, both of which require fuel that must be imported; during a period of complete closure of key ports in November 2017, humanitarian agencies estimated that around eight million people temporarily lost access to running water when fuel for pumps and distribution could not be procured.

==== Collapse of health systems and epidemics ====
The war has severely weakened Yemen’s health system. More than half of the country’s health facilities have been reported as non-functional, a situation attributed to airstrikes, damage to buildings, departures or non-payment of staff, and long-term shortages of medicines and equipment.Facilities that continue to operate frequently do so under difficult conditions, facing unreliable electricity, scarce fuel for generators and obstacles in maintaining hygiene standards or cold-chain storage. Researchers link these operation difficulties to port restrictions, disrupted supply chains and the broader economic crisis.

This institutional collapse has coincided with a series of major epidemics. Yemen has experienced what many researchers describe as the largest recorded cholera outbreak in modern times, with over one million suspected cases and earlier World Health Organization estimates of more than 600,000 cases with over 2,000 deaths. The spread of cholera has been associated with the destruction of water treatment plants, malfunctioning sewage systems and fuel shortages that hindered water pumping and waste disposal. Interruptions in vaccination campaigns and the wider deterioration of primary health care also facilitated outbreaks of diphtheria and measles,while when the COVID-19 pandemic reached Yemen, observers reported delayed vaccine delivery, limited testing capacity and additional economic pressure due to rising prices and economic stagnation.

According to Al Jazeera, outdated medical equipment, airport closures, and budget cuts are jeopardizing patient outcomes in Yemen. More than a decade of war in Yemen has taken a heavy toll on the healthcare system. People in the country are unable to afford treatment for serious illnesses, such as cancer, due to restrictions on travel abroad for treatment, a lack of medical facilities, and insufficient resources.

==== Displacement and collapse of coastal fishing livelihoods ====
Displacement has been a persistent feature of the conflict. Around 3.65 million Yemenis are estimated to be internally displaced, and many households have moved multiple times as fighting shifted between regions. These people often end up in overcrowded camps or informal settlements, or are absorbed into host communities whose resources and services are already under strain, which can limit displaced people access to shelter, education, health care and employment.

On the Red Sea coast, these patterns of displacement intersect with the decline of artisanal fishing. Before the war, fishing was the country’s second largest export sector after oil and gas and an important pillar of local livelihoods, providing work for more than half a million people and supporting an estimated 1.7 million. From 2015 onwards, airstrikes, naval attacks and blockades targeted fishing boats, landing sites and coastal settlements, which, combined with security restrictions and interception at sea, made fishing increasingly dangerous. Because of this, in some coastal areas only about half of the fishermen were able to continue going to sea, while in others the residents have completely abandoned their homes following repeated attacks.

Data indicate that the average monthly income of the fishermen still operating fell by around 45 percent, while the cost of boats and engines rose sharply as the currency weakened and imports became more expensive. At the same time, the volume of fish reaching inland markets such as Sanaʿa reportedly declined by more than half, while retail prices increased by roughly 30–40 percent. This combination of reduced supply and higher prices contributed also to the food insecurity problem. Moreover, the closure or partial shutdown of fish-processing plants, ice factories and related businesses led to thousands of job losses along the chain, with analysts noting how the sector may even experience further shocks, including the possibility of an oil spill in the Red Sea.

==== Risk of an oil spill ====
The FSO Safer, a floating oil storage and offloading tanker moored off Yemen’s Red Sea coast and holding around 1.1 million barrels of oil, has become a major humanitarian concern for the country. Since 2015, the vessel has not received proper maintenance, and experts have warned that corrosion or technical failure could lead to a large spill. Modelling exercises suggest that a serious spill could force the closure of major Red Sea ports such as Hudaydah and Salif, with the port of Aden possibly also affected in the Gulf of Aden. Such a scenario would cause an interruption of food assistance and a dramatically acute fuel shortage, among other consequences, and worsen the already severe humanitarian challenges the country is facing.

==== Obstacles to humanitarian aid delivery ====
Humanitarian agencies in Yemen operate in an environment shaped by military, administrative and political constraints imposed by the different sides of the conflict. At sea, naval controls, inspection regimes and port restrictions have delayed or limited the arrival of food, fuel and medical supplies, creating recurrent logistical challenges.

In territories controlled by the Houthis instead, aid efforts have also been victim of a dense bureaucracy, as the creation of the Supreme Council for the Management and Coordination of Humanitarian Affairs (SCMCHA) gave the Houthis decisional power over project approvals, staff movement, and local partnerships among many other things. Reports from donors and humanitarian organizations describe then diversion of assistance, pressure to channel funds and contracts through Houthi-linked entities, black-market resale of aid and attempts to impose additional taxes on humanitarian programmes, all of which have delayed operations and increased their cost.

Donor governments have debated imposing stricter conditions or suspending some forms of assistance in response to these actions, but such measures have been pursued cautiously because of concerns that a reduction in aid would primarily affect civilians who depend on it.

== See also ==
- Outline of the Yemeni crisis, revolution, and civil war (2011–present)
- South Yemen insurgency
- COVID-19 pandemic in Yemen
- Yemen cholera outbreak
- Health in Yemen
- Famine in Yemen (2016-present)
