= Al-Houthi family =

Yemeni Hashemite Arab clan

Al-Houthi
- Hashemite tribe
- Ethnicity: Arab
- Nisba: Al-Houthi
- Location: Saada Governorate, Yemen
- Descended from: al-Sayyid Badr ad-Dīn ibn Amīr ad-Dīn ibn al-Ḥusayn al-Houthi ibn Muḥammad ibn al-Ḥusayn ibn Aḥmad ibn Zayd ibn Yaḥyā ibn ‘Abd Allāh ibn Amīr ad-Dīn ibn ‘Abd Allāh ibn Nahshal ibn al-Muṭahhar ibn Aḥmad ibn ‘Abd Allāh ibn ‘Izz ad-Dīn ibn Muḥammad ibn Ibrāhīm ibn al-Muṭahhar ibn Yaḥyā ibn al-Murtaḍā ibn Muṭahhar ibn al-Qāsim ibn al-Muṭahhar ibn Muḥammad ibn al-Muṭahhar ibn ‘Alī ibn Aḥmad ibn Yaḥyā ibn al-Ḥusayn ibn al-Qāsim ibn Ibrāhīm Ṭabāṭabā ibn Ismāʿīl al-Dībādj ibn Ibrāhīm al-Ghamr ibn al-Ḥasan al-Muthannā ibn al-Ḥasan ibn ʿAlī ibn Abī Ṭālib
- Parent tribe: Rassids
- Religion: Zaydi Shi'ism

Al-Houthi are an influential Yemeni family who trace their origins to the Banu Hashim, descending directly from Hasan ibn Ali. Initially a scholarly family of the Zaydi tradition based in Sa'dah, the family fell into political prominence in Yemen in the 1990s, centering upon Badruddin al-Houthi and his ideals of a Zaydi-ruled Yemen, though his views were considered rather proximate to Twelver Shi'ism as commonly practiced in Iran where he had spent considerable time residing and held unwaning admiration for Ruhollah Khomeini and his Shi'ite-system of governance.

== Arrival in Northern Yemen ==
The al-Houthi family being part of the Hashemite Sadah social class of North Yemen bears a common ancestor to the other Zaydi Hashemite families in the region, all being descended from Yahya ibn Husayn al-Rassi al-Hasani who arrived in Sa'ada in 894 AH (Anno Hegirae), he was a follower of Zaydi Shi'ism and gave rise to the Hadawi school of thought within it.

== Description ==
The family is mainly based in the Marran Mountains of Sa'ada Province in North-Western Yemen, their common grandfather Husayn ibn Muhammad had migrated there from Houth. The al-Houthi clan has produced numerous Ulama of the Zaydi Shia community in Yemen, being affiliated with the Jaroudi sect of Zaydism. The family traditionally had presided as Qadis in the Sa'ada region until the 1962 civil war in Yemen which resulted in the Mutawakkilite Kingdom—a continuation of the Zaydi Imamate that had ruled Yemen for about one thousand years—being overthrown by the Yemeni republicans supported by Gamal Abdel Nasser of Egypt. The Zaydi Imamate was ruled at that time by the Rassid dynasty from which the al-Houthi clan derives.

Members of the family, most notably Badreddin al-Houthi and his son Hussein, were among the founders of the Hizb al-Haqq party; the former was also elected as a representative for this party in 1993. However, the Houthi representatives soon distanced themselves from the party, which they considered "elitist and co-opted by the Saleh regime".

Hussein al-Houthi subsequently became the first leader of the Houthi movement that sought to bring back Zaydi Shia rule to Yemen. There were several factors that contributed to mounting frictions and the rise of the Houthi movement. The president of North Yemen (and subsequently unified Yemen), Ali Abdullah Saleh, came from a Zaydi Shia family, but not all Zaydis accepted his rule as legitimate as Saleh was not part of the elite Sayyid class of Yemen. Hence, according to Zaydi doctrine, he was not a legitimate Imam of the Zaydi community. Moreover, the position of Saudi-backed Salafis and other Sunni groups in Yemen steadily increased from the 1970s onward, as did the position of Sheikhs who sometimes cooperated with these Salafi groups for pragmatic reasons. The Salafis reportedly pursued an aggressive "policy of provocation" towards the Zaydis who inhabited the surrounding area, often accusing them of apostasy and sometimes even destroying their cemeteries. Despite this, the Salafi school enjoyed the support of both the Saudi and North Yemeni regimes. This situation helped sow the seeds for mounting discontent among the Zaydi population and ultimately Zaydi revivalist movements such as the Houthis.

While the Houthi vision for Yemen is generally seen as entailing the leadership of a Sayyid or Hashemite, the movement is ambiguous about the necessity of Sayyid rule or some kind of imamate. It sees these elements as "preferable" but not as absolutely crucial. Today, the Houthi movement and tribe is led by Abdul-Malik al-Houthi, the younger brother of Hussein al-Houthi. The leaders of the Houthi movement derive from this tribe.

== Notable members ==
- Abdul-Malik al-Houthi (born 1979)
- Badreddin al-Houthi (1926–2010)
- Hussein al-Houthi (1959–2004)
- Mohammed al-Houthi (born 1979)
- Yahia al-Houthi (born 1961)
