= 2024 al-Bayda bombing =

2024 bombing in al-Bayda, Yemen

al-Bayda bombing
- Part of Yemeni crisis
- Location: Radda District, al-Bayda, Yemen
- Date: March 19, 2024
- Attack type: Bombing
- Deaths: 12-20 civilians including 9 from the same family
- Injuries: 13-27 civilians
- Victim: Civilians
- Perpetrator: Houthis

On 19 March 2024, Houthi militants in Yemen blew up a house in the city of Radda, the capital of al-Bayda governorate, killing at least 12 people, nine of which were from the same family.

== Background ==
A day before the attack, two Houthi fighters were killed in an ambush allegedly set up by the house's owner, Ibrahim al-Zalei. Local media reported that the Houthi attack targeted the homes of the Al-Naqus and Al-Zayla’i families in retaliation for the killing of two Houthi members, who were allegedly shot by a member of the latter family the previous Sunday.

== The bombing ==
Houthis besieged the house and its surroundings in the district of Radea, in the Bayda early Tuesday, before booby-trapping the house and blowing it up, causing severe damage to neighboring buildings. They also carried out a campaign of house raids and widespread arrests of citizens.

The Musawa Organization for Rights and Liberties stated that the bombing resulted in the collapse of 8 neighboring buildings. They also stated that this assault left nine dead and nine others wounded from the same family.

== Reactions ==
- Yemeni Information Minister Muammar al-Eryani said the bombing led to the collapse of nearby houses, killing at least 12, most of them women and children, with 20 more still buried under the debris, he also accused the Houthis of adopting a "policy of bombing houses and forcibly displacing their residents as an approach to terrorize citizens" in revenge against opponents of their coup.
- Houthi-run Interior Ministry said detonating the house was an “irresponsible reaction” by security forces who used “excessive force in an illegal way” while pursuing suspects behind Monday's ambush. It said an investigation committee has been formed to bring those involved to justice.
