= Houthi insurgency =

2004–2014 political-religious armed movement escalating into the Yemeni Civil War

- Part of the Yemeni crisis and the Iran–Saudi Arabia proxy conflict
Date	18 June 2004 – 16 September 2014 (10 years, 2 months, 4 weeks and 1 day)
Location	Yemen
Result	Houthi victory: Conflict escalates into a full-scale civil war with the Yemeni government and foreign intervention; Houthi rebels take over Sa'dah and establish an independent administration in Sa'dah Governorate and parts of 'Amran, Al Jawf and Hajjah.; Houthis take control of Sanaa; Yemeni government under President Hadi relocated from Sanaa to Aden

Belligerents
Yemen: Central Security Organization; Sunni tribes; Al-Islah militias; Saudi Arabia	Houthi movement	al-Qaeda: Ansar al-Sharia

Commanders and leaders
(Yemen) Abdrabbuh Hadi (2012–2015) (Yemen) Hameed Al-Qushaibi † (Yemen) Ali Abdullah Saleh (2004–2012) (Yemen) Mohammed Basindawa (2011–2014) (Yemen) Ali Mohsen al-Ahmar (2004–2014) (Yemen) Ali Muhammad Mujawar (2007–2011) (Yemen) Abdul Qadir Bajamal (2001–2007) (Yemen) Ahmed Saleh (2000–2012) (Yemen) Yahya Saleh (2001–2012) (Yemen) Amr Ali al-Uuzali † (Yemen) Ali Salem al-Ameri † (Yemen) Ahmed Bawazeir † (Saudi Arabia) Khalid bin Sultan (2011–2013) (Saudi Arabia) Saleh Al-Muhaya (2009–2011)	Abdul Malik al-Houthi; Hussein Badreddin al-Houthi †; Yahia al-Houthi; Muhammad al-Houthi; Abdul-Karim al-Houthi; Abdullah al-Ruzami (POW)^{3} Abu Ali al-Hakem; Yusuf al-Madani; Taha al-Madani; Abu Haider †; Abbas Aidah †; Mohammad Abd al-Salam; Ali al-Qantawi †; Fares Mana'a^{4} (Yemen) Ali Abdullah Saleh (alleged from 2014) (Yemen) Ahmed Saleh (alleged from 2014) (Yemen) Yahya Saleh (alleged since 2014)	Nasir al-Wuhayshi †; Qasim al-Raymi; Nasser al-Ansi †; Ibrahim al-Rubaish †; Khalid Batarfi; Harith bin Ghazi al-Nadhari †

Strength
Yemen: 30,000 soldiers in-theatre 66,700 total 27,000 tribal fighters Saudi Arabia: 100,000 deployed 199,500 total	Houthis; 2,000 (2004); 10,000 (2009) 100,000 (2011)	-

Casualties and losses
Yemen: 1,000–1,300 killed 6,000 wounded (Yemeni claim); 2,600–3,000 killed 8,000 wounded (Independent estimates); 495 captured (all released); Saudi Arabia: 133 KIA; 470 WIA 6 MIA/POW	3,700–5,500 rebels and civilians killed 3,000 arrested	-
- Total casualties: Hundreds to thousands killed (humanitarian organizations), 25,000 (Houthi sources); 2,000 Sa'dah residents handicapped 250,000 Yemenis displaced 1.General Ali Mohsen al-Ahmar in charge of Yemeni operations against the Houthis until 2011 when he deserted. 2.Sheikh Badreddin al-Houthi died of natural causes in November 2010; 3.Sheikh Abdullah al-Ruzami turned himself in to the authorities in 2005, but later he was released 4.Sheikh Farris Mana'a was a government ally until his arrest in 2010, after which he endorsed the Houthis and was appointed to head their administration.

The Houthi insurgency, also known as the Sa'dah Wars, was a military rebellion that began in northern Yemen and has since escalated into a full-scale civil war. The conflict was sparked in 2004 by the government's attempt to arrest Hussein al-Houthi, a Zaidi religious leader of the Houthis and a former parliamentarian on whose head the government had placed a $55,000 bounty.

Initially, most of the fighting took place in Saada Governorate in northwestern Yemen, but some of the fighting spread to neighbouring governorates Hajjah, 'Amran, al-Jawf and the Saudi province of Jizan. After the Houthi takeover of the capital city Sanaa in late 2014, the insurgency became a full-blown civil war with a major Saudi-led intervention in Yemen beginning in March 2015.

== Background ==
In 1962, the September revolution in North Yemen ended over 1,000 years of rule by Zaidi Imams, who claimed descent from the Hashemites. Sa'dah, in the north, was their main stronghold and since their fall from power the region was largely ignored economically and remains underdeveloped. The Yemeni government has little authority outside the capital Sanaa.

During Yemen's 1994 civil war, the Wahhabis, an Islamic group adhering to a strict version of Sunni Islam found in neighboring Saudi Arabia, helped the government in its fight against the secessionist south. Zaidis complain the government has subsequently allowed the Wahhabis too strong a voice in Yemen. Saudi Arabia, for its part, worries that strife instigated by the Zaidi sect so close to Yemen's border with Saudi Arabia could stir up groups in Saudi Arabia itself.

The conflict was sparked in 2004 by the government's attempt to arrest Hussein Badreddin al-Houthi, a Zaidi religious leader of the Houthis and a former parliamentarian on whose head the government had placed a $55,000 bounty.

Hussein Badreddin al-Houthi's movement accused Ali Abdullah Saleh of massive financial corruption and criticized him for being backed by Saudi Arabia and United States at the expense of the Yemeni people and Yemen's sovereignty.

== Motives and objectives ==
When armed conflict erupted between the Yemeni government and Houthis for the first time in 2004, Ali Abdullah Saleh, the Yemeni president, accused the Houthis and other Islamic opposition parties of trying to overthrow the government and the republican system. As such, the Yemeni government alleged that the Houthis were seeking to overthrow it and to implement Zaidi religious law.

Houthi leaders for their part rejected the accusation, stating that they had never rejected the president or the republican system but were only defending themselves against government attacks on their community. The Houthis said that they were "defending their community against discrimination" and government aggression. The Yemeni government has accused Iran of directing and financing the insurgency.

According to a February 2015 Newsweek report, the Houthis are fighting "for things that all Yemenis crave: government accountability, the end to corruption, regular utilities, fair fuel prices, job opportunities for ordinary Yemenis and the end of Western influence."

In an interview with the Yemen Times, Hussein al-Bukhari, a Houthi insider, said that the Houthis' preferred political system is a republic with a system of elections where women can also hold political positions. Furthermore, he said that they do not seek to form a cleric-led government after the model of the Islamic Republic of Iran, since "we cannot apply this system in Yemen because the followers of the Shafi doctrine are bigger in number than the Zaydis."

== Timeline ==
=== Phase 1: June–September 2004 ===
From June to August 2004, government troops battled supporters of al-Houthi in the north. Estimates of the dead range from 500 to 1,000. On 10 September, Yemeni forces killed al-Houthi. Since then, the rebellion has been led by one of his brothers, Abdul-Malik al-Houthi, while his father, Badreddin al-Houthi, became the group's spiritual leader.

=== Phase 2: March–June 2005 ===
Between March and April 2005, around 1,500 people were killed in a resurgence of fighting between government forces and supporters of the slain cleric, now rebranded as Houthis.

In May 2005, the rebels rejected an offer of a presidential pardon by President Ali Abdullah Saleh after their conditions for surrender were refused by the government, and minor clashes continued. On May 21, the government released estimates of the impact of the insurgency, announcing that the insurgency was responsible for 552 deaths, 2,708 injures, and over US$ 270 million in economic damages.

It was reported at the time that Badreddin al-Houthi and the Houthis' military commander Abdullah al-Ruzami surrendered to Yemeni authorities after tribal mediators worked out a deal with the government. However, this was based on a deliberate misrepresentation by the Saleh regime of a letter by the Houthi leaders in which they tried to negotiate.

In September 2005, Saleh made a speech announcing that he granted amnesty to all jailed Houthi supporters and that a financial compensation would be provided to the Hamid al-Din family which had ruled the Zaydi Imamate until 1962. However, these announcements were not carried through, except for the release of about 50 people out of a total of 4,000- to 5,000 imprisoned.

=== Phase 3: November 2005 – 2006 ===
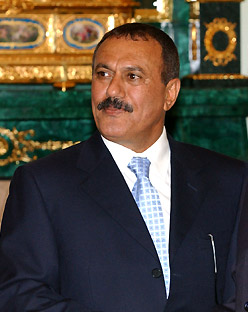
Ali Abdullah Saleh

Fighting broke out again on 9 November 2005 and continued until early 2006. The pro-government Hamdan tribe, led by Sheikh Abdullah al-Awjari, battled with pro-Houthi tribes and Houthis tried to assassinate a Ministry of Justice official in Dhamar. The fighting ended before the presidential elections that year and in March 2006, the Yemeni government freed more than 600 captured Houthi fighters. There was no data with regards to casualties in 2006, but they were said to be significantly lower than those of the previous year. However, this was also linked to the Saleh regime's intensified censorship and crackdown on free press, making it virtually impossible for journalists to investigate the conflict.

=== Phase 4: January–June 2007 ===
Fighting broke out on 28 January 2007, when militants attacked a number of government installations in Saada Governorate, causing 26 casualties; with six soldiers killed and leaving a further 20 injured.

Further attacks on 31 January left six more soldiers dead and 10 wounded. A further ten soldiers died and 20 were wounded in an attack on an army roadblock near the Saudi Arabian border on 1 February. Though there was no official confirmation of militant casualties in the attacks, government sources claim three rebel fighters were killed in a security operation following the 31 January attacks.

In February, the government launched a major offensive against the rebels involving 30,000 troops. By 19 February, almost 200 members of the security forces and over 100 rebels had died in the fighting. A further 160 rebels were killed in the subsequent two weeks. A French student was also killed.

A ceasefire agreement was reached on 16 June 2007. The rebel leaders agreed to lay down arms and go into exile in Qatar (by whom the agreement had been mediated), while the government agreed to release rebel prisoners, help pay for reconstruction and assist with IDPs returning home. In total some 1,500 people were killed by the conflict in 2007, including 800 government troops, 600 rebels and 100 civilians.

=== Phase 5: March–July 2008 ===
Armed incidents resumed in April 2008, when seven Yemeni soldiers died in a rebel ambush on 29 April. On 2 May, 15 worshippers were killed and 55 wounded in a bombing at the Bin Salman Mosque in Saada as crowds of people left Friday prayers. The government blamed the rebels for the bombing, but the Houthis denied responsibility. Shortly after the attack, three soldiers and four rebels died in overnight skirmishes.

On 12 May, clashes between Yemeni soldiers and rebels near the border with Saudi Arabia killed 13 soldiers and 26 rebels. During fighting in May 2008, a total of 1,000 government forces were killed and 3,000 injured. Some 70,000 people were displaced by the fighting. President Saleh declared an end to fighting in the northern Sa'dah governorate on 17 July 2008.

=== Phase 6: Operation Scorched Earth, August 2009 – February 2010 ===
On 11 August 2009, the government promised to use an "iron fist" against the rebels. The Yemeni troops, backed by tanks and fighter aircraft, launched a fresh offensive, code-named Operation Scorched Earth, against the Houthis in the northern Sa'ada province. Hundreds of thousands of people were displaced by the fighting.

On 17 September, more than 80 people were killed in an air raid on a camp for displaced people in northern Yemen.

The conflict took on an international dimension late in the month. Clashes were reported between the Houthis and Saudi security forces near the border. Also, Yemeni officials captured a boat in the Red Sea that was transporting anti-tank shells and, according to some reports, five Iranian "instructors" sent to help the Houthis. Various official Iranian sources responded, calling this claim a politically motivated fabrication, and stating that the ship was traveling for business activities carrying no consignment.

In early November the rebels stated that Saudi Arabia was permitting Yemeni army units to launch attacks from across the border at a base in Jabal al-Dukhan, charges which were denied by the Yemeni government. In late October, heavy clashes in the area of Razih led to the Houthis capturing two military headquarters and killing Yemeni General Amr Ali Mousa Al-Uuzali. In early November, General Ali Salem al-Ameri and regional security chief Ahmed Bawazir were killed in a Houthi ambush as they were returning from Saudi Arabia.

=== Attacks on Saudi Arabia's borders, new ceasefire: November 2009 – January 2010 ===
The conflict took on an international dimension on 4 November 2009 when the Houthis attacked the Saudi border, killed one of the Saudi border guards, seized al-Khubah Village and other villages. The Houthis accuse Saudi Arabia of supporting the Yemeni government in attacks against them. It was not clear what type of support they meant. The Saudi government denied this. The rebels shot dead a Saudi security officer in a cross-border attack. The rebels took control of a mountainous section inside Saudi Arabia, in the border region of Jabal al-Dukhan and occupied two villages inside Saudi territory.

The Houthis had entered Saudi territory and attacked patrols, and that a second soldier later died from wounds sustained in the same clash. On 5 November, Saudi Arabia responded by launching heavy air strikes on rebels in northern Yemen, and moved troops nearer the border. Saudi government officials said only that the air force had bombed Yemeni rebels who had seized a border area inside the kingdom, which they said had now been recaptured. The officials said at least 40 rebels had been killed in the fighting. The Saudi government adviser said no decision had yet been taken to send troops across the border, but made clear Riyadh was no longer prepared to tolerate the Yemeni rebels.

The Saudi assault continued the following day, as Saudi residents near the southern border of Jizan Province were evacuated. At the same time, a Houthi spokesman reported to the media that they had captured Saudi troops. On 18 November, Yemen forces killed two Houthi commanders, Abbas Aaida and Abu Haider. On 19 November, Yemeni forces took control of al-Malahiz, killing the local commander Ali al-Qatwani.

On 20 December, a Saudi air strike killed some civilians. According to a spokesman for the Houthis, a Saudi attack killed 54 people in the town of Al Nadheer in the northern province of Sa'dah. The group also claimed that Saudi forces were advancing on the nearby town of Zawa, also in Sa'dah, and had fired more than 200 shells.

On 22 December, the Houthis stated that they managed to repulse Saudi Arabian forces trying to infiltrate into the province of Sa'dah, killing an unspecified number of Saudi soldiers in a battle in the border region.

The fighting between Yemeni and Saudi forces and Houthis killed at least 119 Yemeni government forces, 263 Houthis, 277 civilians and 7 foreign civilians. Saudi casualties were confirmed at 82 at the time. With more soldiers killed in subsequent clashes and missing soldiers being found dead, however, the casualties rose to 133 killed by 22 January 2010. The number of missing was put at six.

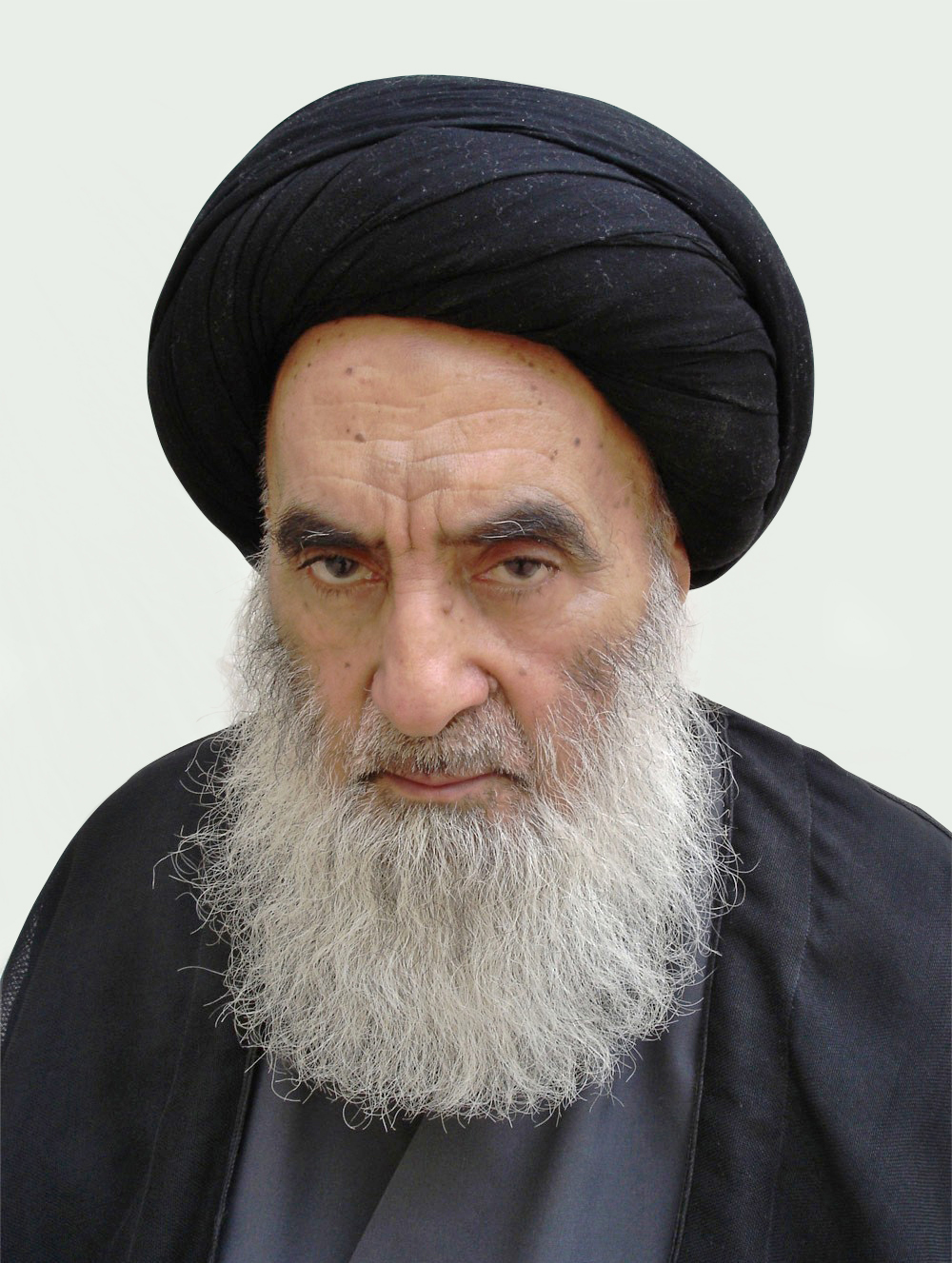
Ali al-Sistani

In early January 2010, the Houthis chose the Iraqi cleric Grand Ayatollah Ali al-Sistani to mediate in their political standoff with the Yemeni government and to find a solution to the conflict. Saudi cleric Mohamad al-Arefe criticized this choice, a preacher at Riyadh's central mosque, who dismissed al-Sistani as "an infidel and debauched." The remarks by the Saudi cleric were considered extremely insulting by Shi'as around the world, causing major outrage in some Shi'a dominant countries like Iraq, Iran and Lebanon.

On 13 January 2010, Operation Blow to the Head was launched in an attempt by the government to capture the city of Sa'adah. Security forces claimed they killed 34 and arrested at least 25 Houthis and killed al-Qaeda in Yemen leader Abdullah al-Mehdar in the next two weeks of fighting.

On 25 January 2010, the Houthis offered a truce. Houthi leader Abdul Malek al-Houthi said they would stop fighting to prevent further civilian casualties and the withdrawal was a gesture for peace, but warned that if the Saudis were to continue fighting the Houthis would go over into open warfare. A Saudi general announced that the Houthis had stopped fighting and were not on Saudi land anymore and that in response the Saudis also stopped fighting saying, "The battle has ended by God's will." But the Saudi king denied the Houthis had withdrawn saying they were forced out, and declared military victory for the end of their conflict with the Houthis. There have however been allegations that the Saudis launched new air raids on 29 January, thus breaking the truce.

On 1 January the Yemeni government offered a conditional cease-fire. The cease-fire had five conditions: the re-establishment of safe passage on roads, the surrender of mountain strongholds, a full withdrawal from all local authority property, the return of all military and public equipment seized during hostilities and the release of all the detained civilians and soldiers. On 30 January, Abdel-Malek al-Houthi released a video wherein he blamed the government for the recent round of fighting but said that: "Nevertheless, and for the fourth time, I announce our acceptance of the [government's] five conditions [for an end to the conflict] after the aggression stops ... the ball is now in the other party's court."

After the truce was accepted on 30 January, there were still some clashes between the Houthis and both Saudi and Yemeni forces. Therefore, on 31 January the Yemeni government rejected the truce and launched a new round of attacks, killing 24 people.

=== Phase 7: 2010 conflict with pro-government tribes ===
In April, Houthi spokesman Mohammed Abdulsalam declared that rebels had captured the Manaba district in Sa'dah, with little government resistance. Government troops declared they had killed 30 Houthis who had tried to penetrate into Harf Sufyan District.

On July 17, 2010, the Houthis warned on their website that the government was preparing for another offensive against the Houthis. They said the government had been digging trenches from the Sanaʽa to Sa'ada. They claimed the army was trying to amass servicemen in villages and that soldiers in al-Amashiyya in Sufyan region were creating an army stronghold on Mount Guide. The report came as the Yemeni government blamed Houthi fighters for recent ethnic clashes which had killed 11 people, including two soldiers, and for the kidnapping of two people in a market. The Houthis have denied these allegations and have claimed that it was the work of the government.

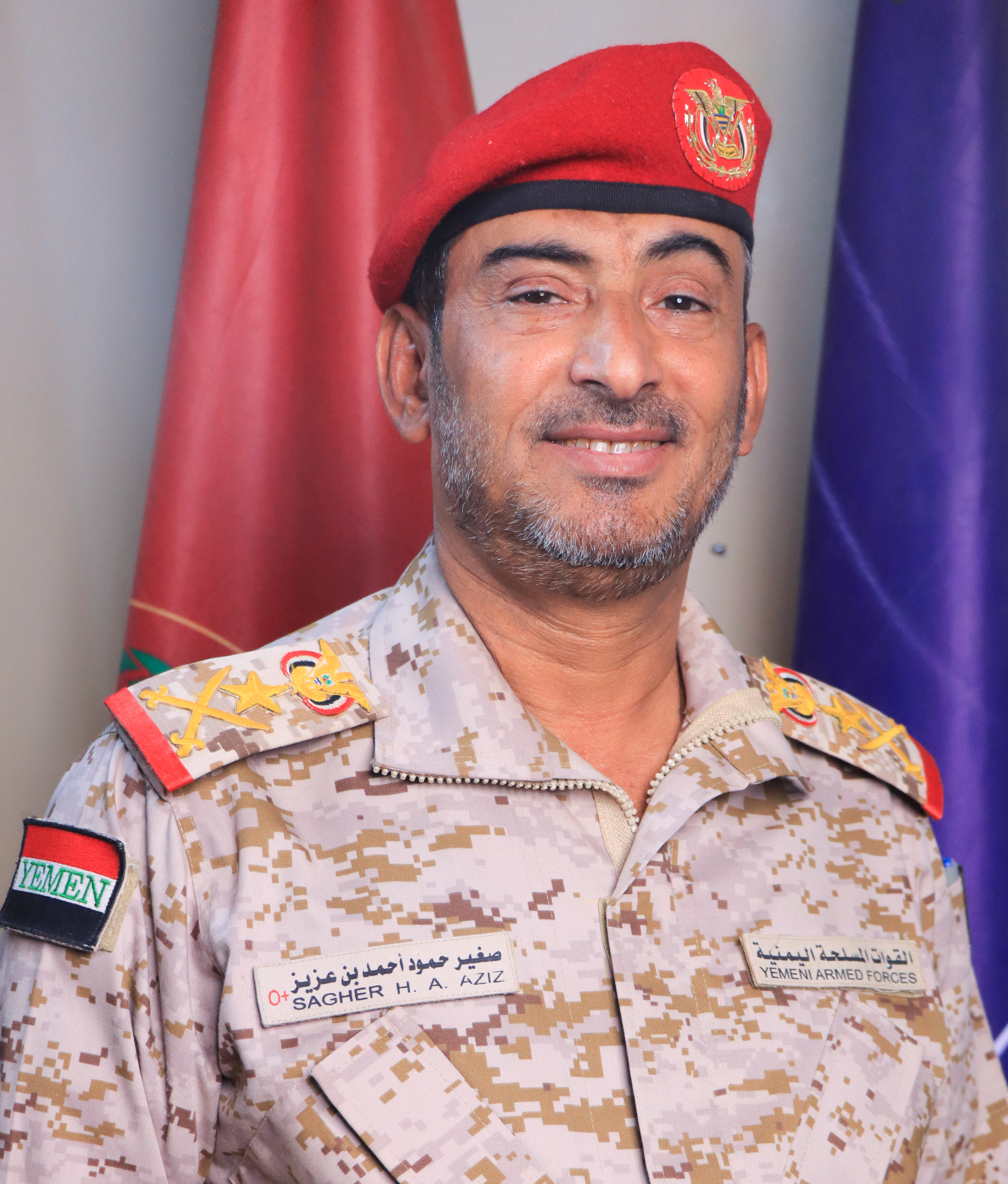
Sagheer Hamoud Aziz

On July 20, 2010, clashes broke out between Houthis and members of an army-backed tribe, led by Sheikh Sagheer Aziz, in the region of Sufyan. A Houthi commander declared that the clashes had broken out because of Yemeni Army attacks on Houthis and local pro-Houthi tribes. Forty-nine people were reported killed in the clashes, including 20 tribal and 10 Houthi fighters. The Houthis also managed to surround the Yemeni military bases in the region.

Over the following days the Yemeni army and pro-government Bin Aziz tribes continued to clash with the Houthis. The government claimed that in the following two days, 20 fighters were killed on each side. A Houthi spokesman denied these claims, stating only three Houthi fighters had been killed in the clashes. Both sides have blamed each other for starting the clashes. The UN expressed great concern about the situation in North Yemen.

On July 23, Houthi spokesman Dayf-Allah al-Shami said calm had returned to the region and that a government committee was trying to mediate a cease-fire between the Houthis and the Bin Aziz tribes in the Sufyan region.

On July 27, Houthis seized a military post at al-Zaala in Harf Sufyan, capturing 200 soldiers of the army's Republican Guard. Tribal sources claimed they had inflicted 200 fatalities on the Houthis in al-Amashiyya while suffering only 30 dead themselves. Houthi spokesman Abdul Salam denied the high number of killed and said the claims were highly exaggerated. Houthis said they recovered the bodies of 17 of their fighters, including that of rebel commander Abu Haidar, near the house of Sheikh Saghir Aziz in al-Maqam, near al-Zaala.

On July 29, the Houthis released the 200 soldiers they had captured as a goodwill gesture. In total some 70 people had died since the clashes started.

On November 22, one soldier was killed and two wounded in a roadside bombing. The next day 23 Houthi fighters and supporters were killed and 30 injured by a car bomb targeting a Shi'a religious procession in al-Jawf province. On November 26, two Shi'a mourners were killed and eight injured by a bomb while on their way to Sa'adah city to attend Badreddin al-Houthi's funeral.

In total, between 195 and 281 people were killed during this round violence, with the majority of the casualties on the Houthi side.

=== 2011 Yemeni revolution ===
A major demonstration by over 16,000 protestors took place in Sanaa on 27 January. On 2 February, President Saleh announced he would not run for reelection in 2013 and that he would not pass power to his son. On 3 February, 20,000 people protested against the government in Sanaa, and others in Aden, in a "Day of Rage" called for by Tawakel Karman. On the same day, soldiers, armed members of the General People's Congress and many others held a pro-government counter-demonstration in Sanaʽa.

On February 27, Abdul Malik al-Houthi announced support for the pro-democracy protests and the effort to effect regime change, as had happened in Tunisia and Egypt. Following these statements, large crowds of Houthis joined in protests across Northern Yemen.

Houthi fighters entered Saada on March 19, engaging in a drawn out battle with the pro-government forces of Sheikh Uthman Mujalli. They seized control of the city on March 24, after destroying Sheikh Mujalli's house and forcing the local governor to flee. The Houthis established military checkpoints at the entrances to the city after police deserted their posts and were relocated to army camps elsewhere.

On March 26, Houthi rebels declared the creation of their own administration in Saada Governorate, independent from Yemeni authorities. A former arms dealer was appointed governor by the Houthis, the previous governor having fled to Sanaa.

On July 8, 23 people were killed in fighting between the Houthis and the opposition Islah party in al-Jawf governorate. The fighting erupted after the governor of al-Jawf fled, opposition tribes took control of the governorate, and the Houthis refused to hand over a Yemeni military base which they had seized several months earlier. Fighting continued until July 11, with more than 30 people killed. The Houthis claimed that some elements of the pro-Islah militias had links to al-Qaeda.

On July 28, over 120 people were killed as the Houthis launched an offensive to take over government buildings in al-Jawf. Fighting in al-Jawf lasted for four months, in which time Sunni tribes claimed to have killed 470 Houthis, while acknowledging 85 casualties of their own. The Houthis eventually took control of al-Jawf governorate.

Territory and areas of influence for rebels (blue) and Islamists (red) in Yemen's uprising, as of 23 October 2011.

In August a car-bombing killed 14 Houthis in al-Jawf. Although the Houthis initially blamed the US and Israel for the bombing, al-Qaeda eventually claimed responsibility, the organization having declared a holy war against the Houthis earlier that year. In early November clashes erupted between Houthis and a Salafi group in Sa'dah, leaving one Salafist dead.

On November 9, after several days of heavy fighting, the Houthis managed to break through defense lines of the pro-government Kashir and Aahm tribes in Hajjah Governorate, seizing control of the Kuhlan al- Sharaf District and advancing towards the port of Midi, thereby gaining access to the sea. Through Hajjah, the Houthis would be able to launch an assault on the Yemeni capital Sanaʽa. By taking Kuhlan Ash Sharaf, the Houthis managed to gain control over a highway linking San'a to the sea.

On November 15, clashes between Houthis and Islah party militia restarted in al-Jawf, after an Islah party member tried to blow himself up during the al-Ghadeer festival, in Al Maton District but was captured and killed by the Houthis. A total of 10 people died in the ensuing fighting.

On December 19, Houthis stormed a Sunni Islamist school in the Shaharah District of 'Amran governorate, injuring one teacher and expelling all teachers and students from the school. Houthis then took up positions inside the school.

On 23 November, Saleh signed a power-transfer agreement brokered by the Gulf Cooperation Council in Riyadh, under which he would transfer his power to his vice-president within 30 days and leave his post as president by February 2012, in exchange for immunity from prosecution. Although the GCC deal was accepted by the JMP, it was rejected by many of the protesters and the Houthis.

A presidential election was held in Yemen on 21 February 2012. With a reported 65 percent turnout, Abdrabbuh Mansur al-Hadi won 99.8% of the vote, and took the oath of office in Yemen's parliament on 25 February 2012. Saleh returned home the same day to attend Hadi's presidential inauguration. After months of protests, Saleh had resigned from the presidency and formally transferred power to his successor, marking the end of his 33-year rule.

Throughout the year, some 200 people were killed in clashes between Houthis and Salafi militias in Sa'dah province.

=== Post–Saleh (2012–2014) ===
On February 26, 2012, heavy fighting occurred in Hajjah governorate as Houthis fought Sunni tribesmen loyal to the al-Islah party. At least seven fighters from the Hajur tribe were killed and nine others injured, while in the Ahem area nine bodies were found, belonging to Houthi fighters. Houthis launched an assault backed by artillery on al-Jarabi area, al-Hazan village, al-Moshaba mountain, and Ahem police station to take control of the al-Moshaba mountain. Parts of the Kushar District were put under siege since clashes erupted in that province between Houthis and the al-Zakari tribe in November. In early February, over 55 people had been killed during sectarian violence in Kushar. During February and March some 27 people were killed and 36 injured due to mines in Hajjah. A total of 600 were killed in clashes in Hajjah between November 2011 and April 2012, mainly in Kushar and Mustaba Districts.

On March 8, a high-ranking military commander and six of his bodyguards were killed by Houthi gunmen in the northern province of Amran.

On March 23, a suicide bomber targeted a Houthi march in Sa'dah. No casualties were reported. On March 25, some 14 people were killed and three injured in a car bombing in al-Hazm of al-Jawf province, targeting a Shi'a gathering near a school. Another 8 Houthis were killed in an attack by Salafis on April 21. From June 2 to June 4, the Houthis clashed with Salafi militias in Kataf district leaving several dead. The Houthis claimed to have taken over three Salafi positions and confiscated Saudi weapons during the clash.

On August 21, clashes broke out between the Houthis and tribes in Ash Shahil district of Hajjah after the Houthis allegedly shot two women in the district. As the fighting broke out, the Houthis retreated from al-Amroor area and retreated to the mountains between Janeb al-Sham and Janeb al-Yemen. The Houthis were said to control several mountains in the region including Mount Azzan and the governorate center that overlooks al-Mahabishah, Qafl Shamer and Ku'aydinah districts. A truce was signed between the two sides on August 30.

Clashes reignited on September 6 and the Houthis managed to seize control of five schools, a medical center and a police station. Some 30 people were killed in the battles. Afterwards Houthis claimed civilian areas were being shelled by al-Islah, while MP Ali al-Ma'amari accused Houthis of killing a worker from Taiz.

In September and October 2012, the Houthis led many protests in Sanaʽa amid anti-American protests across the Islamic world caused by the release of Innocence of Muslims. Houthi slogans were hung all across the old city of Sanaʽa and Shi'a majority areas during the protests. This led to the Houthis expanding their control in Sanaʽa Governorate and other areas around the capital, particularly Khwlan and Sanhan Districts and the town Shibam Kawkaban in al-Mahwit. Al-Juraf district was also named as a Houthi stronghold, where they had large numbers of weapons stationed. Sunni sources have alleged that the Houthis used the protests to smuggle weapons and fighters from areas surrounding Sanaʽa into Sanaʽa city itself, mainly in the old city.

During one of the protests, in Raydah, Amran, clashes broke out between Houthis and Islahi gunmen after the Islahi gunmen interrupted a Houthi mass rally denouncing Innocence of Muslims and the US government on September 21. Two people were killed during the clash and three Islahi gunmen were captured. Fighting continued until September 23, leaving 16 fighters dead and 36 Islah men captured by the Houthis. After a cease-fire was agreed on, the Houthis withdrew from the town and released the prisoners they had taken. A group of Houthis remained in Owaidan mosque.

=== 2014: Transition to civil war ===
Houthi control from 2014 to 2015

On 18 August 2014, the Houthis began a series of demonstrations in Sanaʽa against increased fuel prices. The protests and their ensuing repression by government security forces led to violent clashes between the Houthis and the government starting 16 September. On 21 September, the Houthis took control of Sanaʽa, after which Prime Minister Mohammed Basindawa resigned and the Houthis signed a deal for a new unity government with other political parties. The protests were marked by clashes between the Houthis and the government and also clashes between the Houthis and al-Qaeda in the Arabian Peninsula.

At least 340 people were killed on the outskirts of the Yemeni capital in one week of fighting between the Shiite rebels and Sunni militiamen before the city fell. The Battle of Sana'a and the following Houthi takeover in Yemen transformed the northern insurgency into a country-wide civil war.

== Alleged foreign involvement ==
=== Iran, North Korea, Libya and Hezbollah ===
There have been a number of allegations that Iran, North Korea, Libya and Hezbollah have intervened to aid the Houthis, including:

- Hezbollah and Iran have been accused of embedding long-term advisors in Yemen in order to help advance the Houthi drone program. Senior Hezbollah operatives, such as Nasrallah advisor Khalil Harb, have been accused of travelling to Yemen to train Houthi rebels since at least 2013, two years before the 2015 civil war began. During this time period, Harb also travelled to Tehran in order to coordinate Hezbollah's operations in Yemen with Iran. Iran has been accused of being behind Houthi drone attacks as recently as 2019.
- The Saudi and Yemeni governments both accuse Iran of helping the Houthis. Iran, they say, has secretly landed arms on the Red Sea coast. In October, 2009, Yemen's government said its navy intercepted an arms-carrying Iranian vessel. Yemen's state-controlled press claims Houthi rebels have been trained in an Iranian-run camp across the Red Sea in Eritrea. Yemen's president, Ali Abdullah Saleh, says members of Lebanon's Iran-backed Hezbollah militia are teaching them. The Yemeni authorities also darkly note that the Houthis' long-time leader, Hussein Badreddin al-Houthi, who died in battle in 2004, used to visit Qom, one of Shia Islam's holiest places. None of these accusations have yet been borne out by independent observers and the Iranians deny any involvement.
- Saudi-owned Al Arabiya claimed that "well-informed sources" are saying that "the president of the former South Yemen (Ali Salim al-Bidh) conducted a secret visit to the Lebanese capital Beirut last October (2009), and tried to contact figures close to Hezbollah aiming to win its support for the Houthi rebels, and for South (Yemen's) secession." The sources added that those Hezbollah-allied figures "informed al-Bidh that the party's top officials do not want to meet with him and that they do not approve the attribution of Hezbollah's name with what is happening in Yemen, or to appear as supporting to any rebellion." Ibrahim al-Mussawi, Head of Hezbollah's Media Unit, told Alarabiya.net that his party denies the report about an alleged secret visit.
- High-ranking officials from the Iranian Revolutionary Guard were said to have secretly met with Houthi rebels and Hezbollah in Yemen to coordinate joint military operations against Saudi positions along the border. Pan-Arab Asharq al-Awsat daily said Arab and Egyptian sources uncovered that a number of intelligence services in the region have learned of the three-way meeting which also aimed at developing a plan to escalate the military situation along the Saudi-Yemeni border. It said the high-level meeting which took place in November, 2009 was the most prominent evidence of "direct Iranian involvement" in the support of Houthi rebels financially, militarily and logistically.
- Yemeni Foreign Minister Abu Bakr al-Qirbi on 13 December 2009 urged Iran to crack down on Iranian groups he accused of aiding Houthi rebels in northern Yemen and held Iran's government partly to blame. He said: "Religious (Shiite) circles and groups in Iran are providing aid to the Huthis," However, Iran has repeatedly denied such accusations.
- On 25 May 2009, Iran first deployed warships to the Gulf of Aden to combat piracy in Somalia. On 18 November, a second group of Iranian warships came to the Gulf of Aden, at the same time as Saudi Arabia imposed a blockade on Houthi-controlled coasts and launched a crackdown on Houthi ships delivering weapons to the Houthis. Iran dispatched its 5th fleet to the Gulf of Aden. Some have alleged that the Iranian Navy is operating there to help supply the Houthis with weapons and counter the Saudi naval power in the area rather than to fight Somali pirates.
- Allegations have been made by the Yemeni government and by Yemeni media that Libya under Muammar Gaddafi provided support to the Houthis before its overthrow in 2011. Documents uncovered in 2011 allegedly reveal Libya's support for the Houthis prior to 2011. Yahia Badreddin al-Houthi, the brother of Houthi leader Abdul-Malik Badreddin al-Houthi, was granted political asylum by Libya in the late 2000s.
- According to a recent UN report made in August 2018, the North Korean government-owned Korean Ministry of Military Equipment and Korea Mining and Development Trading Corporation (KOMID) are supplying the Houthis with arms which violated North Korea's sanctions.

=== Saudi Arabia, Egypt, Jordan, Sudan, Bahrain, and the United Arab Emirates ===
Saudi Arabia has led a major military intervention in Yemen, and organized a coalition of other nations to support its efforts, including Egypt, Jordan, Sudan, and Bahrain.

=== United States ===
In December 2009, The New York Times reported that the US has provided weapons and logistical support to Yemeni government strikes against suspected hide-outs of al-Qaeda within its borders. The officials said that the American support was approved by President Obama and came at the request of the Yemeni government.

On June 17, 2011, following Friday prayers, tens of thousands of protestors rallied in Saada against US interference in Yemen.

The Houthis blamed US intelligence forces of carrying out a bombing in August 2011 which killed 14 Houthi fighters.

=== Other ===
- Jordan: It has been alleged that Jordan deployed commandos to fight alongside the Saudis during their offensive in Northern Mount Al-Dukhan and that Saudis sent the Jordanian commandos to fight in Northern Yemen. They also sent auxiliary units to support Saudi forces. By December 2009, it was alleged that over 2,000 Jordanian soldiers were fighting at the front.
- Morocco: It was alleged that Morocco have sent hundreds of elite fighters, mainly para-troopers trained for counter-insurgency operations, to aid the 2009–2010 Saudi offensive.
- Pakistan: Initially it was alleged in some news channels that the Pakistan government had sent contingent of special forces to join Yemeni counter insurgency operations in Sa'dah. However, Pakistan government has strongly rejected these rumors of sending Pakistani troops to join a Saudi-backed coalition forces fighting Houthi rebels in war-stricken Yemen. The official statement says Government of Pakistan is in favor of a peaceful solution to this dispute.

== Humanitarian effects ==
In April 2008, the United Nations High Commissioner for Refugees estimated that the conflict had created 77,000 internally displaced persons (IDPs) in Sa'dah Governorate. By order of then king Abdullah of Saudi Arabia, the Saudis were to shelter and build 10,000 new homes for the war-displaced people of Saudi nationality in Jizan.

=== Use of child soldiers ===
UNICEF and the Islamic Relief were reported as condemning Houthi rebels for abusing children by forcing them to fight for their cause. In November 2009, over 400 children walked to the UNDP office in Sanaʽa, to protest against the alleged Houthi abuse of children's rights.

Allegations were made that both the Yemeni government and the Houthi rebels exploited the use of child soldiers during the war. Human Rights Watch noted difficulty in citing the exact numbers of child soldiers on the Houthis' part. However, there existed a significant amount of evidence that the government itself employed child soldiers in the ranks of the armed forces, the result of the country's lack of birth certificates and further documentation of age. Where the Yemeni government was limited by restrictions, The Times reported on a fourteen-year-old boy who fought for a tribal militia sponsored by the government.

A Sanaʽa-based human rights group, Seyaj Organization for Childhood Protection, noted that the Houthis were mainly responsible, stating that fifty-percent of the rebels were under the age of eighteen. It is estimated that anywhere between 400 and 500 children are killed every year in Yemen as the result of tribal conflict. The same organization eventually released a report claiming that 700 children were used as soldiers by the Houthis and pro-government militias during the war. The report concluded that 187 children were killed during the conflict, 71% as the result of the fighting.

These allegations were supported by the story of "Akram," a nine-year-old boy who was duped by a cousin to deliver a bomb to an unspecified target in the Old City of Saada. Akram, unknowingly wired with an explosive, was apprehended by police and taken to safety in Sanaʽa, along with his father. A day after telling his story at a press conference Akram's home was bombed in Saada City. His younger brother suffered injuries in the retaliation.

The Panel of Experts on Yemen was informed regarding Yemen's widespread exploitation of youngsters in hostility-related activities. In 2017 and 2018, it was able to document three examples of children aged 12 to 15 being employed by Houthi troops to combat. The youngsters were kidnapped from their homes or schools in two situations. The boy in the other case was enticed away from his house by Houthis who told him he was going to a three-day educational camp. The three children were transferred to a training camp for three to four months, where they were taught about ideology and jihad and given small-arms training.

Saudi Arabia has also been accused of using child soldiers from Darfur in the frontline of the Yemen war.

=== Attacking civilian targets ===
The UN has determined that both Houthi and coalition forces willfully assaulted civilian targets, in breach of international law. This covers the devastation of a Doctors Without Borders hospital in 2015. Other alleged war crimes committed by both sides include torture, arbitrary arrests, and forced disappearances. Moreover, in a letter dated 27 January 2020 from the Panel of Experts on Yemen addressed to the President of the Security Council, the Panel reports that it was informed of 14 cases involving the use of improvised explosive devices against civilians that were ascribed to the Houthis. The Panel was able to complete investigations in two of these situations, finding that the two cases resulted in the deaths of three civilians, two of whom were children, and the injuries of 16 others, all of whom were children. The deployment of unguided explosive ordnance in populated areas generated questions about whether the principles of international humanitarian law were being followed.

== See also ==
- Outline of the Yemeni crisis, revolution, and civil war (2011–present)
- Timeline of the Yemeni crisis (2011–present)
- Yemeni Revolution
- Yemeni crisis (2011–present)
- Yemeni civil war (2014–present)
- Southern Movement
- South Yemen insurgency
