= Vilayat-e Faqih =

Vilayat-e Faqih (Persian: ولایت فقیه, also velāyat-e faqīh), is Persian for guardianship of Faqīh (an Islamic jurist)

- For the doctrine, see the Guardianship of the Islamic Jurist
- For the Vilayat-e Faqih (Guardianship of the Islamic Jurist) in the Islamic Republic of Iran, see the Supreme Leader of Iran
- For the current Vali-e-Faqih (Guardian Jurist) of Iran, see Ayatollah Mojtaba Khamenei
- For the book by Ayatollah Ruhollah Khomeini establishing the doctrine of faqih as ruler, see Islamic Government: Governance of the Jurist
