= Fares Manaa =

Yemeni arms-dealer, businessman, and politician

Fares Mohammed Manaa

Minister of State Disputed
- Incumbent
- Assumed office 28 November 2016
- President: Saleh Ali al-Sammad
- Prime Minister: Abdel-Aziz bin Habtour

Governor of Saada*
- In office 27 March 2011 – 24 December 2014
- Preceded by: Taha Hajer
- Succeeded by: Mohamed Jaber Awadh al-Razehi

Personal details
- Born: February 8, 1965 (age 61) Sa'dah, Yemen
- Party: Independent; GPC (until March 2011)
- Profession: Arms-dealer, businessman, former governor

Military service
- Allegiance: Houthis
- Battles/wars: Houthi insurgency in Yemen
- His authority as governor was not recognised by the Yemeni government in Sana'a

Fares Mohammed Manaa (Arabic: فارس محمد مناع; born February 8, 1965) is a Yemeni arms-dealer, businessman, rebel commander and politician. He is said to be Yemen's most famous arms-dealer.

== Early life ==
Manaa was born on February 8, 1965, in the northern city of Saada. He graduated from the Faculty of Commerce and Economics at Sanaa University.

== Political career ==
Manaa was an ally of Yemeni President Ali Abdullah Saleh and member of his ruling GPC party and served as head of his presidential committee and as head of a local council tasked with mediating a peace-deal between the Yemeni government and Houthis during the Shia insurgency in Yemen. His brother was the governor of Saada Governorate at the time.

=== Sanctions and allegations ===
Manaa was put on a UN Security Council list of people accused of trafficking arms to Somali Islamist insurgent group Al-Shabaab, which is considered a terrorist organisation by the United States and is accused of links with al-Qaeda. This led to his assets being frozen by the U.S. Department of the Treasury. He was also accused of receiving millions in funds from the then Libyan ruler Muammar Gaddafi, spying for Libya and supplying arms to the Houthis. Manaa denied these charges claiming that arms had been stolen by Houthis from an arms deposit he owned. In October 2009 he was put at the top of a blacklist of Yemeni arms-dealers, after which he was put under surveillance.

=== Arrest and detention ===
In late January 2010, Manaa was arrested by Yemeni authorities leading to protests in Sa'dah by tribal chiefs and the resignation of his brother, Hassan Manaa, as governor. In May, a mini-bus driver was killed and a policeman and a civilian woman were injured as a group of Manaa's men attacked the car in which he was being transported to a penal court. This resulted in his trial being delayed by 25 days. He was eventually released on June 4, after which his relations with President Saleh soured.

=== Role in 2011 uprising and governorship ===
On March 19 2011, Houthis attacked the city of Sa'dah, starting a battle with pro-government al-Abdin tribesmen, led by Yemeni lawmaker Sheikh Othman Majali. During the battle, rebels joined forces with Fares Manaa and after their victory, set up a local committee, composed of rebels, residents and defected military commanders, which appointed him as the new governor of Sa'dah on 26 March, after the pro-Saleh governor Taha Hajer fled to the capital Sanaa. He subsequently led the Houthi-aligned administration in Saada governorate until December 2014.

=== Later political role ===
Following the establishment of the Houthi-led Supreme Political Council in 2016, Manaa was assigned a ministerial role. Later reports referred to him as a former Minister of State.
