= Al Khubah =

- Village
- Location in Saudi Arabia
- Coordinates: 16°47′19″N 43°13′19″E
- Country: Saudi Arabia
- Province: Jizan Province
- Time zone: UTC+3 (EAT)
  - Summer (DST): UTC+3 (EAT)

Al Khubah (Arabic: الخوبة) is a village in Jizan Province, in south-western Saudi Arabia.

== See also ==
- List of cities and towns in Saudi Arabia
- Regions of Saudi Arabia
