= Dar Sad district =

Coordinates: 12.9069°N 44.9783°E

Dar Sad District مديرية دار سعد
- District
- Interactive map of Dar Sad District
- Country: Yemen
- Governorate: Aden

Population (2003)
  - Total: 79,712
- Time zone: UTC+3 (Yemen Standard Time)

Dar Sad District (Arabic: دار سعد) is a district of the Aden Governorate, Yemen. As of 2003, the district had a population of 79,712 inhabitants.
