= Mustaba district =

Coordinates: 16°10′N 43°15′E

Mustaba District مديرية مستباء
- District
- Interactive map of Mustaba District
- Country: Yemen
- Governorate: Hajjah

Population (2003)
  - Total: 42,531
- Time zone: UTC+3 (Yemen Standard Time)

Mustaba District (Arabic: مديرية مستباء) is a district of the Hajjah Governorate, Yemen. As of 2003, the district had a population of 42,531 inhabitants.
