= Abdullah al-Ruzami =

Yemeni rebel

- Military career
- Allegiance: Houthi movement
- Conflicts: Houthi insurgency in Yemen

Abdullah Eida al-Ruzami was the military leader of Houthis, who fought against the Saudi-backed government of Yemen during the Houthi insurgency in Yemen.

He co-signed a letter to the Yemeni government with Yahia Badreddin al-Houthi, the rebels' spiritual leader, in May 2005 offering an end to the uprising if the government would send emissaries or ended the military campaign against the rebels. "But if injustice continues with killing, destroying, and imprisonment... then the trouble will not be solved, but will become more complicated and the gap will become even wider."

Al-Ruzami has twice turned himself in to government authorities, but has never been arrested or imprisoned. Ten days after the alleged death of al-Houthi in September 2004, and again on 23 June 2005, al-Ruzami turned himself into police in Sana'a after negotiations between tribal authorities.
