= Yahia al-Houthi =

Houthi leader (born 1961)

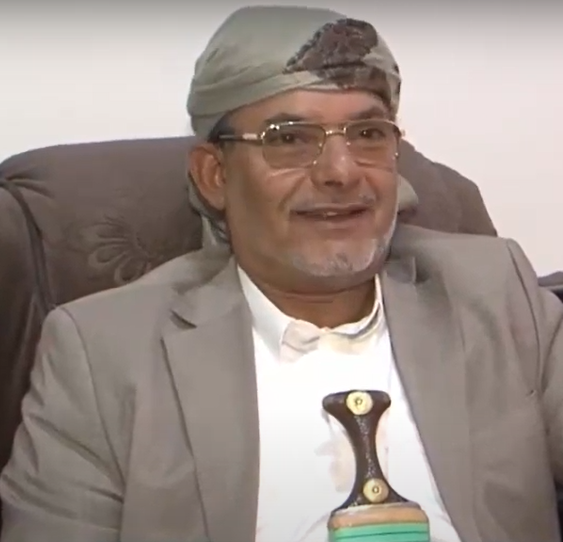

Minister of Education disputed
- In office 28 November 2016 – 12 August 2024
- President: Saleh Ali al-Sammad; Mahdi al-Mashat
- Prime Minister: Abdel-Aziz bin Habtour
- Succeeded by: Hassan Abdullah Yahya Al-Saadi

Personal details
- Born: 1961 (age 64–65) Ar Ruways, Saada Governorate, North Yemen
- Parent: Badreddin al-Houthi (father)
- Relatives: Abdul-Malik al-Houthi; Hussein al-Houthi (brothers); Mohammed al-Houthi (cousin)

Military service
- Allegiance: Houthis
- Battles/wars: Houthi insurgency

Yahia Badreddin al-Houthi (Arabic: يحيى بدر الدين الحوثي; born 1961) is a Yemeni political leader and brother of current Houthi leader Abdul-Malik, late Houthi leader Hussein, Muhammad, Ibrahim, Abdulkhalik, and Abdul-Karim.

al-Houthi cosigned a letter to the Yemeni government with Abdullah al-Ruzami, the rebels' military leader, in May 2005 offering an end to the uprising if the government would send emissaries or ended the military campaign against the rebels. "But if injustice continues with killing, destroying, and imprisonment... then the trouble will not be solved, but will become more complicated and the gap will become even wider." He was a Yemeni lawmaker but was forced to flee to Germany after the Yemeni government lifted his parliamentary immunity to try him for his involvement in the Houthi rebellion. He was then tried in absentia.

On 5 February 2010, he was sentenced to 15 years' imprisonment. He remained in Germany until he returned to Yemen in 2013.

When the Supreme Council for the Management and Coordination of Humanitarian Affairs (SCMCHA) proposed a 2 percent tax on humanitarian aid, al-Houthi spoke out against SCMHCA chairman Ahmed Hamid, calling him and the organization "illegitimate" and criticizing how they handle international aid.
