= Badreddin al-Houthi =

Yemeni cleric and politician (1926–2010)

Badreddin al-Houthi بدرالدين الحوثي
- Born: 3 November 1926; Dahyan, Saada, Kingdom of Yemen
- Died: 25 November 2010 (aged 84)
- Political party: Party of Truth (Yemen)
- Children: Hussein, Abdul-Malik, Yahia, Muhammad, Ibrahim, Abdulkhalik, Abdul-Karim
- Family: al-Houthi

Badreddin al-Houthi (Note: Arabic: بدرالدين الحوثي, romanized: Badr al-Dīn al-Ḥūthī) (3 November 1926 – c. 25 November 2010) was a Yemeni cleric and politician. A Zaydi Shia religious leader, he was one of the founders of the Party of Truth in Yemen and the spiritual leader of the Houthis.

He was also the father of the founder of the Houthi movement, Hussein al-Houthi, and the father of the organization's current leader, Abdul Malik al-Houthi.

== Biography ==
He was born in Dahyan, Saada. He is one of the founders of the Party of Truth in Yemen and the spiritual leader of the Houthi movement. Upon the death of his son Hussein in 2004, he briefly took over the leadership of the Houthi movement.

In 2010, al-Qaeda in the Arabian Peninsula announced that it targeted his convoy on Eid al-Ghadir with a car bomb between Saada and al-Jawf on November 24, 2010. A day later, the Houthis announced that he died at the age of 84 as a result of complications related to asthma.

== Personal life ==
Badr al-Dīn married four times. Two of his wives were of tribal, two of sayyid (hashemite) background. His first wife came from a minor tribal shaykhly family of the local Khawlān tribe in Marran district, and bore his sons Husayn, Yahya, ʿAbd al-Qadir and Ahmad. His second wife belonged to Āl al-Sittīn, an influential sayyid family of Dahyan, and bore Muhammad and Hamid. His third wife came from another minor tribal shaykhly family of the local Khawlan tribe in Marran, and bore Amir al-Din and Ibrahim. His fourth wife was from Āl al-ʿIjri, a sayyid clan from the vicinity of Haydan, and bore ʿAbd al-Malik, ʿAbd al-Khaliq, Najm al-Din, ʿAbd al-Salam and ʿAli. His thirteen sons and numerous daughters were born and raised in the area of the Khawlān tribe in Marran district. The exact number of daughters is not known.
