= Hussein al-Houthi =

Yemeni politician and religious leader (1959–2004)

- حسين الحوثي
- Al-Houthi, date unknown
- Born: Hussein Badreddin al-Houthi; 20 August 1959; Saada Governorate, North Yemen
- Died: 10 September 2004 (aged 45); Saada Governorate, Yemen
- Cause of death: Killed in action
- Known for: Founding father of the Houthi movement
- Father: Badreddin al-Houthi
- Relatives: Abdul-Malik al-Houthi (brother); Yahia al-Houthi (brother); Mohammed al-Houthi (cousin)
- Military career
- Allegiance: Houthis
- Service years: 2004
- Rank: Commander
- Conflicts: Houthi insurgency in Yemen

Hussein Badreddin al-Houthi (Note: Arabic: حسين الحوثي, romanized: Ḥusayn al-Hūthī) (20 August 1959 – 10 September 2004) was a Yemeni politician and religious leader who was the founder of the Houthi movement. A member of the Yemeni parliament for the Party of Truth between 1993 and 1997, he served as a key figure in the Houthi insurgency against the Yemeni government, beginning in 2004.

Al-Houthi, who was a one-time rising political aspirant in Yemen, had wide religious and tribal backing from Zaydi Shia communities in northern Yemen's mountainous regions. Al-Houthi was killed by security forces in Saada Governorate in 2004.

== Early life ==
Hussein al-Houthi was born on 20 August 1959 in the Marran area, the ancestral home of the Houthi tribe, in northern Yemen. Some sources have stated his year of birth was 1956. Nevertheless, the part of Yemen Al-Houthi hailed from formed the core of the Yemen Arab Republic (North Yemen). His father, Badreddin al-Houthi, was a prominent Zaydi cleric who briefly took control of the Houthi movement after his son's death.

According to a disciple, Hussein al-Houthi lived part of his life with his family, including his father, Badreddin and his younger brother, Abdul-Malik, in Qom, Iran. The disciple also claimed that al-Houthi had close relationships with Ali Khamenei, Supreme Leader of Iran, and Hassan Nasrallah, Hezbollah's former leader.

== Political career ==
=== Member of Al-Haqq ===
Al-Houthi was a member of the Yemeni Zaydi/Shafi'i political party Al-Haqq (The Truth). When the party supported South Yemeni separatism, it became a target of the government, and he fled, allegedly, to Syria and then to Iran. After his return to Yemen, he broke with Al-Haqq to form his own party.

=== Believing Youth movement ===
Al-Houthi founded the Believing Youth movement (Arabic: شباب المؤمنین) in 1990 or 1992 to teach young persons about Zaidi Islam and its history to revive Zaydism in Saada Governorate.

=== Forming Ansarallah ===
Al-Houthi was accused by the Ali Abdullah Saleh government of trying to set himself up as an imam, of setting up unlicensed religious centres, of creating an armed group called Ansarallah and of staging violent anti-American and anti-Israeli protests, as al-Houthi's followers felt Yemen's government was too closely allied with the United States.

== Death ==
On 18 June 2004, Yemeni police arrested 640 of his followers, who were demonstrating in front of the Great Mosque of Sanaa. Two days later the Yemeni government offered a bounty of $US55,000 for his capture, launching an operation aimed at ending his alleged rebellion.

In July, the Yemen Army forces killed 25 of his supporters and increased the bounty to $US75,500. After months of battles between Yemeni security forces and Houthis, on 10 September the Yemeni Interior and Defence Ministries released a statement declaring that he had been killed, along with 20 of his aides, in Marran province, Saada Governorate.

== Legacy ==
On 5 June 2013, tens of thousands of Yemeni Shias attended the reburial of the remains of al-Houthi in Sa'dah, where armed rebels were deployed in large numbers. The new Yemeni government had turned over his remains to his family on 28 December 2012 as a goodwill gesture to bolster national reconciliation talks. The previous government of Ali Abdullah Saleh, who had stepped down in 2012 after the Yemeni revolution, originally buried al-Houthi in 2004 at the Sana'a central prison to prevent his grave from becoming a shrine for the Zaidis. A representative of Yemeni President Abdrabbuh Mansur Hadi attended the funeral, but a Houthi spokesman accused the central government of refusing to give visas to several dignitaries who wanted to travel to Yemen to attend the ceremony and of tearing down pictures of al-Houthi put up in the Yemeni capital.

The Houthis take their name from the family name al-Houthi. His brothers Abdul-Malik, Yahia, and Abdul-Karim are leaders of the rebels as were his late brothers Ibrahim and Abdulkhalik.

== Notes ==
Preceded by Post-Created	Leader of the Houthi Movement; June 2004 – September 2004	Succeeded by Abdul-Malik al-Houthi
