= Abdul-Malik al-Houthi =

Leader of the Houthis since 2004

- عبد الملك الحوثي
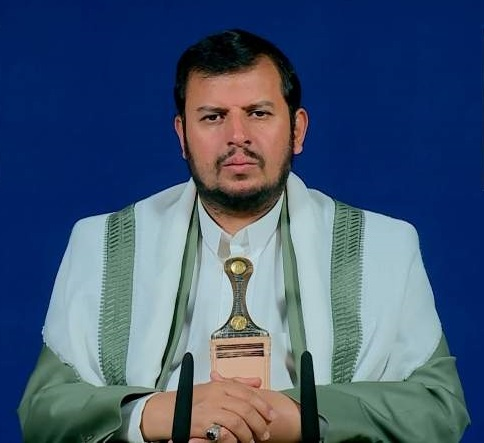
- al-Houthi in 2024

2nd Leader of the Houthis
- Incumbent
- Assumed office 10 September 2004
- Preceded by: Hussein al-Houthi

De facto ruler of Houthi-controlled Yemen
- Incumbent
- Assumed office January 2010
- President: Mohammed al-Houthi; Saleh Ali al-Sammad; Mahdi al-Mashat
- Prime Minister: Talal Aklan; Abdel-Aziz bin Habtour; Ahmed al-Rahawi; Mahdi al-Mashat
- Preceded by: Position established

Personal details
- Born: Abdul-Malik Badr al-Din al-Houthi; 22 May 1979 (age 47) Saada Governorate, North Yemen
- Relations: Houthi family
- Parent: Badreddin al-Houthi (father)
- Relatives: Hussein al-Houthi (brother); Yahia al-Houthi (brother); Mohammed al-Houthi (cousin)
- Profession: Politician; Religious leader; Tribal chieftain
- Tribe: Houthi

Military service
- Allegiance: Houthis
- Years of service: 2004–present
- Rank: Commander
- Battles/wars: Houthi insurgency; Yemeni civil war (2014–present); Saudi Arabian-led intervention in Yemen; Gaza war; Red Sea crisis; 2024 missile strikes in Yemen; March–May 2025 United States attacks in Yemen; 2025 Israeli attacks in Yemen; 2026 Iran war; 2026 Houthi strikes on Israel

Abdul-Malik Badr al-Din al-Houthi (Note: Arabic: عبد الملك الحوثي, romanized: ʿAbd al-Malik al-Ḥūthī) (born 22 May 1979) is a Yemeni politician and religious leader who is the second leader of the Houthis (Ansar Allah), an organization principally made up of Zaydi Shia Muslims, since 2004.

His late brother Hussein was the founder of the group, whose leadership he succeeded after the latter's death in battle. Abdul-Malik al-Houthi is the leading figure in the Yemeni civil war which started with the Houthi takeover in Yemen in the Saada Governorate in northern Yemen.

== Personal life ==
Al-Houthi was born in Saada Governorate, Yemen Arab Republic, into the Houthi tribe on 22 May 1979. He is a Zaydi Shia Muslim. His father, Badreddin al-Houthi, was a religious scholar of Yemen's minority Zaydi sect. Abdul-Malik is the youngest among his eight brothers. His older brother, Hussein, was politically active and a member of the parliament of Yemen, as well as being a prominent critic of the former President of Yemen, Ali Abdullah Saleh. Hussein founded the Houthi movement to promote Zaidi thought, "rise against the oppressors ruling Yemen", and to provide educational and social services. After Hussein was killed, Abdul-Malik succeeded him by taking control of the Houthi movement.

== Political activity ==
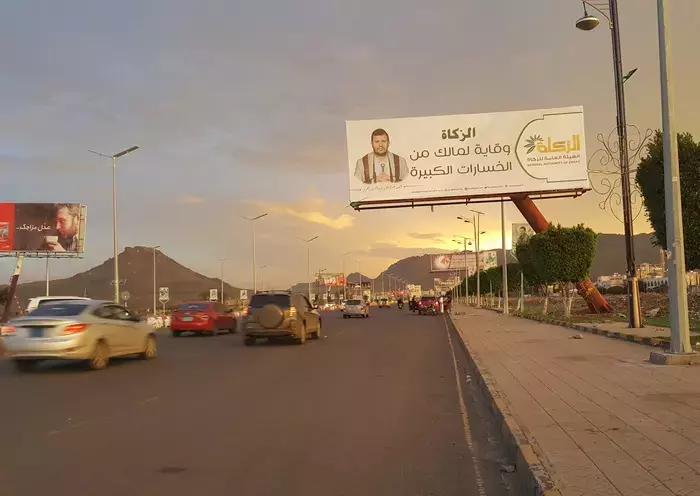
A billboard in Sanaa featuring al-Houthi

Abdul-Malik al-Houthi criticized the Yemeni government for maintaining a status quo in the country, which he said had plunged people into poverty, and accused the government of marginalizing the Zaidi community. The Yemeni government of President Ali Abdullah Saleh accused al-Houthi's group of trying to reestablish the "clerical imamate", which al-Houthi denied.

Al-Houthi was reported to have been badly injured during an air raid in December 2009, a claim denied by a spokesman. On 26 December 2009, two days after a heavy air strike from the Royal Saudi Air Force, it was claimed that Al-Houthi had been killed. However, the claim was refuted by the Houthis, who then released video evidence showing he was alive.

Al-Houthi addressed the nation on Yemen TV in a late-night speech on 20 January 2015, after troops loyal to him seized the presidential palace and attacked the private residence of president Abdrabbuh Mansur Hadi in Sana'a. He demanded Hadi implement reforms giving the Houthi movement more control over the government. Although it was initially reported that Hadi conceded to al-Houthi's demands, the president resigned from office on 22 January, saying the political process had "reached a dead end". The UN Security Council then imposed sanctions on al-Houthi. He was praised by Iranian conservative politician Mohsen Rezaee, in a statement of moral support and defense of "real Islamic awakening".

During the bombing of the Sanaa airport by Saudi-led coalition warplanes in 2015, missiles pounded al-Houthi's hometown of Marran.

Al-Houthi condemned the UK military cooperation and arms sales to the Saudi military. According to a Sky News analysis, The UK has sold at least £5.7bn worth of arms to the Saudi-led coalition fighting in Yemen since 2015.

During the Gaza war, Al-Houthi's spokesperson Yahya Saree stated that the Houthis had launched a large number of missiles and drones towards Israel, however, they were not explicitly declaring war on the country.

In March 2025, al-Houthi condemned the massacres of Syrian Alawites and the publication of such killings on social media. He accused the Syrian Armed Forces of being "Takfiri groups" that commit genocide against defenseless citizens.

== International reaction ==
The UN announced a travel ban on al-Houthi in November 2014 after the Houthi takeover of Sana'a. On 27 April 2015, the US Treasury Department added Abdul-Malik to its Specially Designated Nationals (SDN) list.

During a visit to the northern province, Jamal Benomar, the former UN envoy to Yemen, met with al-Houthi and said he supported the Houthi group in their rejection of moving the talks between Al Houthi and the current government outside of Yemen, in spite of the complaint of Hadi, the Yemeni legitimate president.

On 10 January 2020, U.S. Secretary of State Mike Pompeo announced plans to designate Abdul Malik al-Houthi, Abd al-Khaliq Badr al-Din al-Houthi and Abdullah Yahya al-Hakim as Specially Designated Global Terrorists. The following year, Antony J. Blinken revoked the designation.

On 16 May 2025, during the context of the Gaza war, Israeli Prime Minister Benjamin Netanyahu and Israeli Defense Minister Israel Katz warned al-Houthi that if his group's attacks on Israel continue, he will be directly targeted and "hunted down and eliminated," saying that al-Houthi could "join the list" of Hamas leader Yahya Sinwar and Hezbollah chief Hassan Nasrallah; both killed by Israel.

== Notes ==
Preceded by Hussein al-Houthi	Leader of the Houthi Movement; September 2004 – present	Succeeded by -
