= Timeline of the Red Sea crisis (2025) =

These are monthly timelines for the year 2025 of the Red Sea crisis, which began on 19 October 2023.

== January 2025 ==
On 1 January, the Houthis claimed to have shot down a US MQ-9 Reaper drone over the Ma'rib Governorate with a surface-to-air missile.

A ballistic missile launched from Yemen was intercepted by the IDF during early morning on 3 January, with fragments falling near Modi'in-Maccabim-Re'ut and in Har Gilo, causing minor damage. Twelve people were injured while running towards shelters, and nine were treated for acute anxiety. A UAV launched from Yemen was later intercepted outside Israeli territory by the IAF. The Houthis took responsibility for both the attacks, claiming to have successfully struck a power plant near Tel Aviv with a Palestine 2 missile and a military target in the Tel Aviv area with the UAV.

On 5 January, another ballistic missile launched by the Houthis was intercepted before crossing into Israeli territory. The Houthis claimed to have successfully targeted the Orot Rabin power station near Hadera. Houthi-run media outlets later reported that the US and UK-led coalition carried out three airstrikes east of Saada.

On 6 January, the Houthis claimed to have stopped US forces from carrying out airstrikes by targeting USS Harry S. Truman with two cruise missiles and four UAVs. The group also claimed to have successfully struck two Israeli military sites in the Jaffa area and another site in Ashkelon with UAVs.

On 8 January, the US Central Command stated that the US military carried out strikes against two underground facilities used by Houthis for storing advanced conventional weapons. The Al-Masirah reported that the US and UK-led carried out five airstikes on Harf Sufyan district in 'Amran Governorate and two airstrikes on Sanhan and Bani Bahlul district in Sanaa Governorate.

On 9 January, Al-Masirah reported that the US and UK-led coalition carried out six airstrikes, including three on the Harf Sufyan district in 'Amran Governorate, two on the Jarban area in Sanaa Governorate and one on the Alluheyah district in Al Hudaydah Governorate. Three UAVs launched from Yemen were meanwhile intercepted by the IAF, with one being shot down over Israeli territory by IAF helicopters and its fragments crashing into an open field, and two others being intercepted by the IAF over the Mediterranean Sea. The Houthis claimed to have successfully struck targets in Tel Aviv area with the three UAVs.

On 10 January, the US-led coalition and IAF carried out coordinated airstrikes on targets in Yemen. Al-Masirah reported that warplanes of US and UK carried out twelve airstrikes on the Harf Sufyan district, six on the Hudaydah Port, and several on Sanaa. More than twenty IAF jets later bombed the Hudaydah Port, Ras Issa port, and the Hezyaz power plant in Sanaa. Al-Masirah reported that a civilian was killed and six others injured in the airstrikes. The Houthis meanwhile claimed to have prevented an attack later by USS Harry S. Truman, after targeting it and several naval vessels it was escorting with several cruise missiles and UAVs.

The Houthis during the night of 11 January claimed to have again successfully targeted USS Harry S. Truman and the naval warships accompanying it over a nine-hour period with multiple cruise missiles and UAVs, forcing the aircraft carrier to withdraw. An American official later confirmed that the carrier and three commercial ships it was escorting had come under attack, but the UAVs and missiles were shot down by destroyers and a helicopter of the US Navy destroyers, as well as a French Air Force aircraft.

On 13 January, a UAV launched from Yemen was intercepted over the Mediterranean Sea by a missile boat of the Israeli Navy. A missile was also intercepted by the IAF before it entered Israeli. The Houthis later claimed to have targeted the Jaffa area with a Palestine 2 missile and four UAVs.

On 14 January, a ballistic missile launched from Yemen was intercepted by Israeli air defenses during the early morning. A fragment of the missile crashed into a home in Mevo Beitar, causing damage, with eleven people being wounded while running to shelters and four being treated for acute anxiety. The Houthis took responsibility for the attack, claiming that they had targeted the headquarters of the Israeli Defense Ministry in Tel Aviv with a hypersonic ballistic missile. The group later claimed to have successfully struck Israeli sites in the Tel Aviv area with UAVs and a power station in Eilat with a cruise missile.

The Houthis on 15 January again claimed to have struck USS Harry S. Truman and the warships accompanying it in the Red Sea with several cruise missiles and UAVs. On 16 January, the January 2025 Gaza war ceasefire was declared by Houthi leader Abdul-Malik al-Houthi to mark Israel's failure in the Gaza Strip. al-Houthi also warned that the group would attack again in case of any breach by Israel.

On 17 January, the Houthis claimed that the US had conducted five airstrikes on the Harf Sufyan district. It later claimed to have targeted Eilat with four cruise missiles, a target in the Ashkelon area with a UAV and the Tel Aviv area with multiple UAVs, in addition to targeting USS Harry S. Truman again.

During the morning of 18 January, the IDF intercepted a ballistic missile launched from Yemen in the morning, with fragments falling near Beitar Ilit, Bar Giora, and Mevo Beitar. Missile debris also damaged homes in Mevo Beitar and Tzur Hadassah. The Houthis claimed to have hit the headquarters of the Israeli Defense Ministry in Tel Aviv. A second ballistic missile was later shot down by air defenses. The Houthis claimed that they successfully hit two vital targets in Eilat with a ballistic missile and cruise missile. The group also claimed that it targeted USS Harry S. Truman and the warships accompanying it in the Red Sea using UAVs and cruise missiles, forcing it to change its operational area.

On 19 January, Al-Masirah reported that the US carried out four airstrikes on the Al-Azraqeen area north of Sanaa. After the implementation of the ceasefire in the Gaza Strip, the Houthis announced on 20 January that they would stop attacking ships transiting through the Red Sea, except for ships affiliated with Israel. They also stated that they would attack the ships of other states in the event of any attack being carried out against it by them.

On 22 January, the Houthis stated that they had released all 25 crewmembers of the cargo vessel Galaxy Leader, which they had seized in November 2023, after mediation by Oman and a request by Hamas. The newly sworn in US president, Donald Trump, reimposed sanctions on the Houthis under the United States Department of State list of Foreign Terrorist Organizations in response to their attacks.

The United Nations stated on 24 January that the Houthis had detained seven more UN personnel and that the organization would suspend movement of UN personnel in Houthi-controlled areas.

== February 2025 ==
On 10 February, the United Nations suspended its operations in the Saada Governorate after the Houthis detained eight more of its staff members. The following day, WFP announced the death of one of its staff members detained by Houthis since January. Abdul-Malik al-Houthi meanwhile warned that the group would resume its attacks if the Gaza war ceasefire collapsed.

On 13 February, Abdul Malik al-Houthi stated that his group would resume attacks if Israel and the US carried out Trump's plan to move Palestinians from the Gaza Strip. On 22 February, two US officials told Reuters that the Houthis had fired surface-to-air missiles at a F-16 fighter jet and an MQ-9 Reaper drone earlier that week, but missed.

== March 2025 ==
On 4 March, the Houthis said they had shot down an MQ-9 over Al Hudaydah Governorate; a US defence official later confirmed to Al Arabiya that they had lost contact with one.

On 5 March, the US imposed sanctions on seven senior members of the Houthi group who smuggled arms and military equipment and negotiated purchases of weapons with Russia. It also sanctioned Abdulwali Abdoh Hasan Al-Jabri, along with his company Al-Jabri General Trading and Investment Co., for raising funds for the Houthis and recruiting Yemenis as mercenaries to fight in Ukraine for Russia.

On 7 March, amid the standoff over the ceasefire in the Gaza Strip, Abdul-Malik al-Houthi warned Israel to resume the entry of humanitarian aid into the Strip within four days or the group would resume its naval attacks against Israel. On 11 March, Houthi spokesman Yahya Saree announced that the group would resume its attacks on Israeli vessels unless the border crossings to the Gaza Strip were reopened and humanitarian aid resumed.

A report released by Conflict Armament Research on 13 March stated that the Houthis were importing components of hydrogen fuel cells from Chinese companies, enabling their UAVs to fly farther and better evade detection.

On 15 March, the US carried out aerial and naval strikes on dozens of Houthi military targets in Yemen after President Trump ordered an escalated military campaign against the Houthis, targeting radars, air defenses, missile and drone systems, and at least one senior Houthi commander. Trump later warned the Houthis to cease their attacks and also warned Iran against assisting them. On the night of 15–16 March, a Houthi missile landed in Egypt, leading the IDF to investigate whether the missile had been aimed at Israel.

On 16 March, the Houthis stated that they had attacked USS Harry S. Truman and its strike group with 18 ballistic and cruise missiles and one UAV. A US official stated that US warplanes shot down 11 UAVs, with none coming close to the warship, while a missile fired by the group fell far from it in the water. The Houthis also announced a "ban" on US vessels entering the Red Sea, the Arabian Sea, and the Gulf of Aden, and said they would target US warships in response to the previous day's American airstrikes.

On 17 March, the Houthis claimed a second attack on USS Harry S. Truman. US Secretary of Defense Pete Hegseth warned the Houthis that the US would continue targeting them unless they stopped attacking international shipping. Pro-Houthi media claimed that the US carried out two airstrikes around Al Hudaydah—one on a cotton-ginning plant and the other on the command cabin of the carrier ship Galaxy Leader, seized by the Houthis in November 2023, and another airstrike on an under-construction cancer-treatment facility in Saada. Trump meanwhile stated that he would hold Iran responsible for any Houthi attack.

On 18 March, the Houthis claimed to have attacked USS Harry S. Truman for the third time with missiles and UAVs, but this was dismissed by US officials. Later, the group launched a ballistic missile at Israel, the first in two months, with the IDF stating that it was intercepted by the Arrow defense system outside Israel's borders. The Houthis stated that they had targeted the Nevatim Airbase with a Palestine 2 missile, and said they would continue their attacks unless Israel ceased its actions in Gaza. At least ten Houthi military officers meanwhile had been killed by US airstrikes.

On 19 March, the US launched multiple airstrikes on Yemen. Al-Masirah stated that the strikes first hit Sanaa, As Safra and Majz districts of Saada Governorate, and the Al-Ahli Sports Club building in the Al Mina district of Al Hudaydah Governorate. The Houthis meanwhile claimed to have targeted USS Harry S. Truman and the accompanying carrier group for the fourth time. US airstrikes also hit Al Hazm district in Al Jawf Governorate, As Sawadiyah district in the Al Bayda Governorate, and Sanaa. The Houthis stated that sixteen of their members were killed in the airstrikes.

On 20 March, the IDF announced that a ballistic missile was intercepted outside of its airspace overnight. Thirteen people were injured while rushing to shelter and another three suffered anxiety attacks. The Houthis claimed to have launched a hypersonic ballistic missile at the Ben Gurion Airport. Later that day, the IDF announced that another missile from Yemen was shot down outside of Israeli airspace, with no injuries being reported. The Houthis claimed that they successfully targeted a military site in Jaffa with a Palestine 2 missile. Al-Masirah meanwhile reported that the US carried out four airstikes on Al Mina district in the Al Hudaydah Governorate and another airstrike on As Safra district of Saada Governorate. The Houthis meanwhile claimed to have attacked USS Harry S. Truman for the fifth time, using ballistic missiles, cruise missiles and UAVs.

On 21 March, The Associated Press cited a US official to state that Hegseth had ordered USS Harry S. Truman to remain in the area for another month and also ordered deployment of USS Carl Vinson to the area. Meanwhile, a ballistic missile launched from Yemen was intercepted outside Israeli territory, with no injuries being reported. The Houthis stated that they had targeted the Ben Gurion Airport, and also claimed to have targeted USS Harry S. Truman and its carrier group again using UAVs. Al-Masirah also reported that the US carried out airstrikes on At Tuhayta district in Al Hudaydah Governorate and Saqayn district in Saada Governorate during the day.

On 22 March, a ballistic missile launched from Yemen fell short and crashed in Saudi Arabia while targeting Israel. The Houthis however claimed that they had successfully targeted the Ben Gurion Airport with a hypersonic ballistic missile. Al-Masirah reported that the US carried out new airstrikes, with three targeting Hodeida International Airport and another five targeting Majzar district in the Marib Governorate. US National Security Advisor Michael Waltz meanwhile stated during the day that the US had so far taken out main leaders of the Houthis, including the commander of their missile crew.

On 23 March, a ballistic missile launched from Yemen towards Israel was intercepted by the IAF outside Israeli borders. The Houthis claimed to have successfully struck the Ben Gurion Airport with a Palestine 2 missile. The group also claimed to have clashed with USS Harry S. Truman and other warships in the Red Sea. The US carried out airstrikes on Saana, Hodeidah Airport, Al Hudaydah, Port of Salif, Al-Jawf Governorate, Sahar and Kitaf wa Al Boqe'e districts in Saada Governorate, and the Marib Governorate during the day, killing one person and injuring thirteen others according to pro-Houthi media. AlHadath reported that the person killed was a senior Houthi official.

On 24 March, the White House stated that US government officials had mistakenly disclosed plans about striking the Houthis to Jeffrey Goldberg, editor-in-chief of The Atlantic, hours before the US carried out airstrikes on 15 March against the group. Meanwhile, a ballistic missile launched from Yemen was intercepted outside Israeli borders, with several pieces of debris falling in Beit Shemesh. The Houthis claimed to have targeted the Ben Gurion Airport with two ballistic missiles and USS Harry S. Truman with ballistic missiles, cruise missiles and UAVs.

On 26 March, the Houthis claimed to have successfully struck military targets in Tel Aviv using a number of UAVs and attacked warships led by USS Harry S. Truman using missiles, UAVs and naval forces. Neither of the attacks were confirmed. Pro-Houthi meanwhile reported that the US carried out airstrikes on the city of Sanaa, Sanhan and Bani Bahlul district and Bani Hushaysh district of Sanaa Governorate, outskirts of city of Saada, Al Salem district of Saada Governorate and Harf Sufyan district of 'Amran Governorate since the previous night, wounding two civilians.

On 27 March, two ballistic missiles launched at Israel from Yemen were intercepted by air defenses outside Israeli borders, with no injuries or damages being reported. The Houthis claimed the attacks, stating that they had launched one missile at the Ben Gurion Airport and another at a military target in Jaffa. The group also claimed to have attacked USS Harry S. Truman with rockets and UAVs. Al-Masirah meanwhile reported airstrikes on Khawlan district of Sanaa Governorate, killing two people and wounding two others. The Wall Street Journal reported that at least 41 Houthis had been killed so far in the airstrikes.

On 28 March, Al-Masirah reported that the US carried out airstrikes on Sanaa, Sanaa International Airport, Saada Governorate, Marib Governorate, Al Jawf Governorate, Al Hudaydah Governorate and 'Amran Governorate, wounding seven people. The Houthi-controlled Ministry of Telecommunications & Information Technology stated that the airstrikes in 'Amran and Saada governorates took out broadcasting stations, communication towers and the messaging network. On 29 March, pro-Houthi media reported that the US carried out airstrikes on Sanna, Al Jawf Governorate and Saada Governorate, killing one person and wounding four others.

During early morning of 30 March, the Houthis claimed that they had attacked USS Harry S. Truman three times with missiles, UAVs and naval forces over the past day. A ballistic missile launched by the group was intercepted before crossing into Israeli territory, with one woman being injured while running to shelter. The Houthis claimed that they successfully struck the Ben Gurion Airport. US airstrikes around Sanaa and in Hajjah Governorate which began during the night and continued till the following morning killed three people and wounded twelve others according to the group. The Houthis meanwhile claimed to have shot down a MQ-9 Reaper drone over Marib Governorate. The group later also released footage purporting to be of the drone's wreckage.

== April 2025 ==
Pro-Houthi media on 1 April reported US airstrikes on Sanhan wa Bani Bahlul and Bani Matar districts in Saana Governorate, El Mansouria district of Al Hudaydah Governorate, Washhah district of Hajjah Governorate and the Saada Governorate. The Houthis stated that at least four people were killed in one of the strikes on a water project in El Mansouria district. Pro-Houthi media stated that the US airstrikes continued into the following day, hitting Hajjah, Saada, Saana and Ibb governorates, killing two more people. The Houthis meanwhile claimed to have attacked USS Harry S. Truman again. The US meanwhile sanctioned Russia-based individuals and entities for assisting Houthis in procuring weapons and other goods.

On 3 April, the Houthis claimed to have shot down a MQ-9 Reaper drone over Al Hudaydah Governorate, im addition to claiming that they attacked USS Harry S. Truman and its accompanying warships using several cruise missiles and UAVs. Pro-Houthi media also claimed that the US carried out airstrikes on Saana and Saada Governorate, in addition to killing a guard of a Houthi communications tower. The Daily Telegraph meanwhile cited a senior Iranian official who stated that Iran was ending its support for the Houthis, and added that a Russian military expert was advising the Houthis from Sanaa.

The Houthis on 4 April claimed to have stopped two planned aerial attacks by the US by targeting USS Harry S. Truman and its accompanying warships. Pro-Houthi media meanwhile reported that the US carried out airstrikes on Saada Governorate. Israeli air defenses shot down a UAV over the Arabah area during the day, with the Houthis claiming to have targeted a military site in Tel Aviv.

Two missiles launched from Yemen on 5 April fell far outside Israeli borders. Saudi media meanwhile reported the deployment of an additional THAAD air defense system battery and two Patriot air defense system batteries. During the day, President Trump also published a video during the day showing a purported bombing of Houthis in an earlier airstrike, however pro-Houthi media reported that it was an Eid gathering in Al Hudaydah Governorate of people not connected to the group. Moammar al-Eryani, the Minister of Information of the internationally recognised Yemeni government, stated that around 70 Houthi members were killed in the airstrike, in addition to members of the Islamic Revolutionary Guard Corps.

Al-Masirah on 6 April reported that the US carried out five airstrikes on Kamaran island. Other airstrikes on Sanaa and Saada killed six people and wounded 32 others according to pro-Houthi media. A UAV launched from Yemen was intercepted by the IAF outside Israeli borders on 7 April. The Houthis claimed to have attacked a military target in the Tel Aviv area with a UAV and two US destroyers in the Red Sea with several missiles and UAVs. Al-Masirah meanwhile reported airstrikes on the Saada and Hajjah governorates.

On 8 April, pro-Houthi media reported that US airstrikes hit Saada, Marib, Al Hudaydah, 'Amran, Sanna, Ibb and Dhamar governorates. The airstrikes killed at least thirteen people and wounded fifteen others in Al Hawak district of Al Hudaydah Governorate, wounded three in Dhamar and Ibb governorates, and hit telecommunications equipment in 'Amran Governorate.

US airstrikes that began on 9 April and continued into the following morning according to pro-Houthi media, killing at least three people in As Sabain district, in addition to hitting the Kamaran island. The Houthis also claimed to have shot down another US MQ-9 Reaper drone over the Al Jawf Governorate, broadcasting footage of its purported wreckage. Al-Masirah on 11 April reported that US airstrikes targeted Sanaa, Bani Hushaysh district, Ma'ain district, Hamdan district and the Jabal Nuqum mountain to the east of Sanaa, hitting residential areas and farmlands. The Houthis also claimed to have attacked USS Harry S. Truman in the Red Sea with missiles and UAVs.

On 12 April, the IDF stated that a UAV launched from Yemen was intercepted, while Jordanian media reported that it had intercepted a UAV over the Dead Sea. A Jordanian military source stated that a UAV crashed in the Ma'in area of Jordan according to a Jordanian military source, with its debris causing a fire to break out. The Houthis claimed to have attacked two military targets in the Jaffa area.

On 13 April, the IDF stated that a ballistic missile launched by the Houthis was intercepted by air defenses, with shrapnel falling in Hebron area of West Bank. The Houthis claimed to have launched two ballistic missiles, attacking the Sdot Micha Airbase and the Ben Gurion Airport, however the IDF stated that only one missile entered Israel, with the other likely falling short outside Israel. The Houthis also claimed to have attacked an Israeli military target in the Ashkelon area, however no such attack was confirmed. Pro-Houthi media meanwhile reported that US airstrikes hit the Al-Sawari Ceramics Factory in the Bani Matar District of Sanaa Governorate and the Khabb wa ash Sha'af district of Al Jawf Governorate, killing at least seven people and wounding 29. The Houthis also claimed to have shot down a MQ-9 Reaper drone over the Hajjah Governorate.

US airstrikes that began overnight on 15 April hit Al Hudaydah, Al Jawf and Marib governorates according to pro-Houthi media. Later, it also reported US airstrikes on Kamaran island. On 16 April, US airstrikes hit As Sabain and Ath'thaorah districts of Sanaa; Bani Hushaysh, Manakhah and Nihm districts of Sanaa Governorate; and Al Hazm district of Al Jawf Governorate, with one person being killed in Ath'thaorah district. Yemeni media also reported that Saudi Arabia bombed the Shada'a District of Saada Governorate with artillery and missiles.

On 17 April, US airstrikes hit the Ras Isa oil port, killing 80 people and wounding 150 others according to the Houthis. The US State Department also accused Chang Guang Satellite Technology Co. Ltd., a Chinese commercial satellite image provider, of providing information to the Houthis, in addition to sanctioning International Bank of Yemen and three of its top officials for helping the Houthis evade sanctions. Meanwhile, pro-Hoithi media reported that the US also carried out airstrikes on a government complex in the Mukayras district of Al Bayda Governorate. Yemeni media also reported airstrikes on Al Sama'a camp in the Arhab district of Sanaa Governorate.

A ballistic missile launched by the Houthis at Israel on 18 April was intercepted by Israeli air defences, with some civilians being injured while rushing to shelters and a fire breaking out near Beit Shemesh due to shrapnel from the interceptor missile. Some shrapnel from the interceptor missile also fell near Beit Fajjar in West Bank. The Houthis claimed to have attacked a military target near the Ben Gurion Airport with the "Zulfiqar" ballistic missile. The group also claimed to have targeted USS Harry S. Truman and USS Carl Vinson as well as their escorting warships, and shooting down a US MQ-9 Reaper drone over Sanaa. The US later acknowledged the loss of the drone.

On 19 April, pro-Houthi media reported US airstrikes on Ath'thaorah and Assafi'yah districts of Sanaa; Bani Hushaysh, Bani Matar, Al Husn and Hamdan districts of Sanaa Governorate; Sirwah district of Marib Governorate; Al Hudaydah and Hodeida International Airport; killing three people and wounding four others. The Houthis also claimed to have shot down another MQ-9 Reaper drone operated by the US.

On 20 April, pro-Houthi media reported that US airstrikes hit Ma'ain and Shu'aub districts of Saana, with twelve being killed and 30 being wounded due to airstrikes on the Farwa neighborhood market in Shu'aub district. The US however later stated that the casualties were caused by an air defense missile of the Houthis. Airstrikes continued overnight into the following day per pro-Houthi media, hitting Marib, 'Amran, Saada and Al Mahwit governorates as well. The Houthis meanwhile claimed that they attacked two targets in Israel with UAVs, including a vital target in Ashkelon using a Yafa-type UAV, and a military target in Eilat using a Samad-1 UAV. The group also claimed to have attacked USS Harry S. Truman and its accompanying warships in the Red Sea, as well as USS Carl Vinson and its accompanying warships in the Arabian Sea.

On 22 April US airstrikes reportedly hit Majzar, Sirwah and Al Abdiyah districts in the Marib Governorate; Al Hazm district of Al Jawf Governorate, At Tuhayta and As Salif districts in Al Hudaydah Governorate, Kamaran island, Al-Salem district in Saada Governorate, Khawlan district in the Sanaa Governorate, Jabal Nehm to the east of Sanaa and Al-Barqa Mountain in the Taiz Governorate. The Houthis meanwhile claimed to have shot down a US MQ-9 Reaper drone over the Hajjah Governorate, in addition to attacking USS Harry S. Truman and USS Carl Vinson along with their accompanying warships in the Red Sea and the Arabian Sea respectively.

On 23 April, a ballistic missile launched from Yemen was intercepted by Israeli air defenses in northern Israel, with a number of people being injured while rushing to shelter. The Houthis claimed to have attacked a vital target in Haifa with the missile, in addition to attacking a target in the Tel Aviv area with a UAV, however no reports of any UAV attack were confirmed. Pro-Houthi media meanwhile reported that US airstrikes struck Al Hudaydah, Marib, Saada and Taiz governorates, hitting telecommunications equipment in Marib Governorate.

On 24 April, pro-Houthi media reported that the US carried out airstrikes on the Sanaa and Saada Governorate, wounding three people. It later reported that the US also carried out airstrikes on Al Haymah Ad Dakhiliyah and Manakhah districts in the Sanna Governorate, as well as Al Hudaydah Governorate, with one person being killed in the Saada Governorate. On 25 April, pro-Houthi media reported that the US carried out airstrikes on Majzar and Medghal districts in the Marib Governorate, Harf Sufyan district in the 'Amran Governorate, Bajil and As Salif districts in Al Hudaydah Governorate, Kamaran island, Nihm and Bani Hushyash district in the Sanaa Governorate, and Al Mahwit Governorate.

On 26 April, the IDF intercepted a ballistic missile launched from Yemen before it crossed the Israeli border. The Houthis claimed that they had targeted the Nevatim Airbase. Later, the IDF shot down a UAV, with the Houthis claiming that they had launched two UAVs at a target. Pro-Houthi media meanwhile reported that the US carried out airstrikes on the city of Sanaa as well as the governorates of Al Hudaydah, Saada, Marib and Al Jawf, with two Yemenis being killed and ten being wounded in Sanaa, in addition to three Russian sailors being injured at the Ras Isa oil port. The Houthis also claimed to have targeted USS Harry S. Truman and USS Carl Vinson, as well as the warships accompanying them, with cruise missiles and UAVs in the Red Sea and the Arabian Sea respectively.

On 27 April, a ballistic missile launched from Yemen was intercepted by Israeli air defenses outside Israeli territory, with the Houthis again claiming to have targeted the Nevatim Airbase. Pro-Houthi media later reported that the US carried out airstrikes on the city of Sanaa as well as Saada and 'Amran governorates, killing eight people in the Bani Al Harith district of Sanaa and wounding several others. US Central Command meanwhile stated that the US military had carried out airstrikes on over 800 targets since 15 March, resulting in more than 650 Houthi casualties.

The Houthis stated on 28 April that they carried out an attack on USS Harry S. Truman and its accompanying warships in the Red Sea with cruise missiles, ballistic missiles and UAVs. An F/A-18 Super Hornet and its tow fell into the sea whilst being towed, with one sailor sustaining a minor injury. The Houthus however claimed to have shot down the jet. An initial probe indicated that the incident occurred after the jet made a hard turn to evade the Houthi attacks. Pro-Houthi media later reported that the US carried out airstrikes on the Harf Sufyan district in the 'Amran Governorate, the Barash area to the east of Jabal Nuqm, the Bart Al Anan district in Al Jawf Governorate, the Bilad Ar Rus district in Sanaa Governorate, the Sahar district in Saada Governorate and a detention centre holding African migrants in the Saada Governorate. 68 people were killed and 47 others were wounded at the detention centre.

On 29 April, pro-Houthi media reported that the US carried out airstrikes on Bart Al Anan district in the Al Jawf Governorate; Bani Matar, Al Husn and Hamdan districts in the Sanaa Governorate; Bani Hushaysh district in the city of Sanaa and Sahar district in Saada Governorate. Arabic media also reported airstrikes on Houthi barracks in Maqbanah district of Taiz Governorate, Farzat Nihm to the east of Sanaa, the Dhamar Governorate, Houthi targets in Al Nahda neighborhood of Sanaa, the First Armored Division camp northwest of Sanaa, the Central Military Region headquarters in Sawad camp south of Sanaa, Al Khalq and Al Ghayl districts in the Al Jawf Governorate, Majzar district in Marib Governorate and Al-Suwadiyah camp in Al Bayda Governorate. UK stated that it had carried out joint airstrikes on Houthis along with the US, targeting a group of buildings manufacturing drones south of Sanaa.

On 30 April, pro-Houthi media reported US airstrikes on Al Hazm district in Al Jawf Governorate and Al Hawak district in Al Hudaydah. The Houthis meanwhile claimed to have targeted USS Carl Vinson in the Arabian Sea and the warships accompanying it, as well as Israeli military sites in Tel Aviv and Ashkelon with UAVs. None of the attacks however were independently confirmed.

== May 2025 ==
On 1 May, pro-Houthi media reported that the US carried out airstrikes on Hamdan district in Sanaa Governorate, the vicinity of the city of Saada, Khabb wa ash Sha'af district of Al Jawf Governorate, Al Wahdah district in the city of Sanaa and Kitaf wa Al Boqe'e district in the Sadaa Governorate. Arabic media also reported airstrikes on 'Amran Governorate, Al Mahwit Governorate and Faj Attan area to the west of Sanaa. Three civilians were wounded in the overnight airstrikes on Sanaa per the Houthi-run Ministry of Public Health and Population.

On 2 May, the IDF stated that two ballistic missiles launched from Yemen were intercepted by air defenses, with shrapnel from the first missile's interception damaging a kindergarten in Mishmar HaEmek. An Israeli civilian was slightly injured while rushing to the shelter. The Houthis claimed to have targeted the Ramat David Airbase and Haifa. The IDF later stated that a UAV launched from Yemen was shot down by the IAF. Pro-Houthi media meanwhile reported that the US carried out airstrikes on the Ras Isa oil port.

On 3 May, the IDF stated that a ballistic missile launched from Yemen was intercepted by air defenses. Later, it stated that it shot down a UAV near the border with Egypt. The Houthis claimed to have attacked a military target in the Jaffa area with the Palestine 2 missile. Pro-Houthi media meanwhile reported that the US carried out airstrikes on Bani Hushaysh district in the Sanaa Governorate, Khabb wa ash Sha'af district in Al Jawf Governorate, Medghal district in the Marib Governorate, As Salif district in Al Hudaydah Governorate and the Kamaran island.

On 4 May, a ballistic missile launched from Yemen hit a grove of trees near an access road of the main Terminal 3 of the Ben Gurion Airport, after the Arrow and the US THAAD systems failed to intercept it. Six people were wounded in the attack, while two others suffered acute anxiety. The Houthis stated that they had targeted the airport with a hypersonic ballistic missile, while also claiming to have struck a vital target in Ashkelon. Netanyahu later vowed to retaliate against Houthis and Iran through multiple strikes. Pro-Houthi media meanwhile reported that the US carried out airstrikes on Majz and Sahar districts in the Saada Governorate, Majzar district in the Marib Governorate, Al Hazm and Khabb wa ash Sha'af districts in Al Jawf Governorate, the Ras Isa oil port, Al-Sawad area to the south of the city of Sanaa and the Kamaran island.

On 5 May, pro-Houthi media reported that the US carried out airstrikes east of the city of Saada; Sanhan wa Bani Bahlul, Bani Hushaysh and Bani Matar districts in the Sanaa Governorate; Shu'aub and Bani Al Harith districts in the city of Sanaa; Al Hazm and Khabb wa ash Sha'af districts in Al Jawf Governorate; and Raghwan district in the Marib Governorate. The Houthis also claimed that the UK was involved in the airstrikes, however the British Ministry of Defence denied involvement. At least fifteen people were wounded in Sanaa according to the group. Later, around 20 IAF fighter jets carried out airstrikes on the Hudaydah Port, Al Salakhanah and Al Hawak neighborhoods of the city of Hodeidah, as well as a cement factory near the city of Bajil, in retaliation for the Houthi missile attack on Israel the previous day. At least four people were killed and 39 others were injured in the attacks according to the Houthi-run Health Ministry.

On 6 May, pro-Houthi media reported that the US carried out airstrikes on Sanhan wa Bani Bahlul district in Sanaa Governorate, Al Hazm district in Al Jawf Governorate and the Ras Isa oil port. Later, the IDF warned civilians to evacuate the Sanaa International Airport. Pro-Houthi media reported that the IAF carried out airstrikes on the airport; power stations in Sanhan wa Bani Bahlul district, Ma'ain district and Bani Al Harith district; as well as a cement factory in the city of 'Amran. The IDF stated that it had completely disabled the airport and destroyed three commercial aircraft of Yemenia Airlines. At least three people were killed and 54 were wounded according to the Houthis. The director of the airport stated that the attack caused damages of around $500 million to the airport.

Trump separately announced on 6 May that the US would cease its attacks on the Houthis after the group agreed to stop its attacks on commercial shipping, with a deal being negotiated between the two by Oman. The group however warned that it would continue its attacks on Israel. While Oman stated that the group would halt its attacks on international shipping, the Houthis only stated that they would halt their attacks on military and commercial ships linked to the US. A F/A-18F Super Hornet meanwhile fell into the sea due to a failed landing on the runway of USS Harry S. Truman. The Houthis later claimed to have attacked the carrier and its accompanying warships with a ballistic missile and a number of UAVs before the ceasefire took effect, causing the crash of the fighter jet and the carrier retreating to the north of the Red Sea.

On 7 May, a UAV launched from Yemen was intercepted by the IAF. The Houthis claimed to have targeted the Ramon Airbase with two UAVs and a vital target in the Tel Aviv area using a Yaffa-type UAV. Israeli defence minister Israel Katz warned the Houthis against continuing its attack on Israel on 8 May, stating that the IDF would inflict heavy blows on it even without US support. On 9 May, a ballistic missile launched from Yemen was intercepted by the IDF. The Houthis claimed to have targeted the Ben Gurion Airport with a hypersonic ballistic missile and a vital military target in the Tel Aviv area with a UAV.

On 11 May, the IDF issued evacuation warnings for the ports of Hudaydah, Ras Isa and Salif before carrying out its attacks on Al Hudaydah Governorate. A ballistic missile launched by the Houthis fell short in Saudi Arabia on 12 May. On 13 May, the IDF intercepted a missile launched from Yemen, with two people being injured while rushing to shelter. Another ballistic missile launched from Yemen fell short. The Houthis claimed that they had targeted the Ben Gurion Airport with a hypersonic ballistic missile. Another ballistic missile launched from Yemen was intercepted by the IDF on 14 May, with the Houthis claiming to have attacked the Ben Gurion Airport. Israel later issued evacuation warnings for the ports of Ras Isa, Hudaydah and Salif.

On 15 May, a ballistic missile launched from Yemen was intercepted by air defenses, with debris falling into the West Bank settlement of Alon Shvut. The Houthis claimed to have targeted the Ben Gurion Airport with a hypersonic ballistic missile. On 16 May, fifteen Israeli fighter jets carried out airstrikes on the ports of Hudaydah and Salif, dropping around 35 munitions per the IDF. The IDF estimated that it would take the Houthis a month to repair the two ports. Katz meanwhile threatened that Abdul-Malik al-Houthi would be assassinated if his group did not stop attacking Israel. The Houthi-controlled Health Ministry stated that one person was killed and nine others were wounded in the airstrikes. The IDF later stated that a UAV launched from east of Israel was intercepted. The Sanaa International Airport resumed operations on 17 May, eleven days after Israel had struck it.

On 18 May, a ballistic missile launched from Yemen was intercepted by Israeli air defenses, with one person being lightly injured while rushing to shelter. The Houthis claimed to have successfully targeted the Ben Gurion Airport with a Palestine 2 missile, a Zulfiqar missile and a Yaffa-type drone. On 19 May, the Houthis announced that they would implement a "maritime blockade" on the Port of Haifa. USS Harry S. Truman meanwhile had left for the Mediterranean Sea, before it returned to Naval Station Norfolk.

Two ballistic missiles launched from Yemen were intercepted by Israeli air defenses on 22 May, with one person being injured while rushing to shelter. The Houthis claimed responsibility for both the missiles, stating that they had targeted the Ben Gurion Airport. The group also claimed to have struck vital military targets in Tel Aviv and Haifa using UAVs, however no such attacks were confirmed. Another ballistic missile launched from Yemen was intercepted by Israeli air defenses on 23 May. The Houthis claimed to have successfully targeted the Ben Gurion Airport with a hypersonic ballistic missile.

A ballistic missile launched from Yemen was intercepted by Israeli air defenses on 25 May, with debris of the missile falling in southern Hebron Hills. The Houthis claimed to have successfully targeted the Ben Gurion Airport with a hypersonic ballistic missile. Two ballistic missiles launched from Yemen were intercepted by Israeli air defenses on 27 May. The Houthis claimed to have targeted the Ben Gurion Airport with a hypersonic ballistic missile, and a vital military target in eastern Jaffa with a ballistic missile.

On 28 May, the IAF bombed the Sanaa International Airport, with Al Masirah stating that it carried out four airstrikes. The airstrikes destroyed the last operational Yemenia airplane which Katz stated was also used to transport Houthi members. On 29 May, Israeli air defenses intercepted a ballistic missile launched from Yemen, with the Houthis stating that they had targeted the Ben Gurion Airport. In retaliation for the attack on Sanaa International Airport on 28 May, the Houthis warned on 30 May that they would target civilian aircraft operated by Israeli carriers as well.

== June 2025 ==
On 1 June, Israeli air defenses intercepted a ballistic missile launched from Yemen. The Houthis claimed that they had targeted the Ben Gurion Airport, in addition to claiming UAV attacks on major targets in Tel Aviv, Ashdod and Eilat areas. The following day, another ballistic missile was intercepted by Israeli air defenses, with the Houthis claiming to have attacked the Ben Gurion Airport. On 3 June, a ballistic missile launched from Yemen was interecepted by the IDF, with shrapnel damaging homes in Modi'in-Maccabim-Re'ut. The Houthis claimed to have targeted the Ben Gurion Airport with a Palestine 2 hypersonic ballistic missile.

On 4 June, the IDF stated that it intercepted a UAV launched from the east over the Be'er Milka area. The Houthis claimed to have targeted the Ben Gurion Airport with two UAVs. A ballistic missile launched from Yemen was interecepted by Israeli air defenses on 5 June, with the Houthis claiming to have targeted the Ben Gurion Airport with a hypersonic ballistic missile.

A missile fired by the Houthis toward Israel fell short inside Saudi Arabia on 9 June. The IDF later issued evacuation warnings for the ports of Hudaydah, Ras Isa and Salif. During the morning of 10 June, Sa'ar 6-class corvettes of the Israeli Navy carried out strikes on the Hudaydah Port with two long-range guided missiles, marking the first Israeli naval strike on the Houthis. A ballistic missile launched later from Yemen was intercepted by Israeli air defenses and the IAF, with the Houthis claiming to have targeted the Ben Gurion Airport with two ballistic missiles.

On 13 June, a ballistic missile launched from Yemen landed in the West Bank town of Sa'ir near Hebron, with five Palestinians, including three children, being wounded. Three UAVs apparently launched from Yemen were later intercepted by the IDF. On 14 June, the IDF stated that it had targeted Muhammad Abd al-Karim al-Ghamari, the Chief of the General Staff of the pro-Houthi faction of the Yemeni Armed Forces. An Israeli official later stated that he had been wounded in the attack, though this was denied by the Houthis.

The Houthis claimed on 15 June that they had targeted the Jaffa area with several ballistic missiles over the past 24 hours, carrying out missile attacks in coordination with Iran for the first time. A ballistic missile launched on 16 June by the Houthis at Israel fell short. Mohammed al-Bukhaiti, a member of the Houthi political bureau, stated on 17 June that the group would intervene to help Iran against Israel and was coordinating with it in its conflict against Israel. The Houthis on 21 June also threatened to target American ships in the Red Sea if the US attacked Iran alongside Israel.

The IDF on 25 June stated that it intercepted a UAV apparently launched from Yemen. A ballistic missile launched by the Houthis on 26 June fell short outside Israel's border per the IDF. On 28 June, the IDF stated that it likely intercepted a ballistic missile launched by the Houthis, with the group later claiming that it had attacked a sensitive target in Beersheba.

== July 2025 ==
On 1 July, the IAF intercepted a ballistic missile launched from Yemen, with the Houthis claiming to have successfully targeted the Ben Gurion Airport with a Palestine 2 hypersonic ballistic missile, in addition to targeting sensitive sites in Tel Aviv, Eilat and Ashkelon with UAVs.

On 6 July, a ballistic missile launched from Yemen was intercepted by the IDF, with the Houthis claiming to have targeted the Ben Gurion Airport. Later that night, the IAF began extensive overnight airstrikes against sites in Yemen codenamed Operation Black Flag, targeting the ports of Al Hudaydah, Ras Isa, and Salif, as well as the Ras Kanatib power plant. The hijacked Galaxy Leader on which the Houthis had installed a radar to track international shipping according to the IDF, was also targeted. Around 20 fighter jets partook in the strikes, dropping 50 munitions.

The Houthis on 7 July targeted Israel with two ballistic missiles during early morning, although no impacts or casualties were reported. The group later also targeted Israel with a UAV which was intercepted, and a ballistic missile which fell short outside Israel. The Houthis claimed to have targeted Israel with eleven missiles and UAVs; including the Ben Gurion Airport, Port of Ashdod, and a power plant in Ashkelon with ballistic missiles; and the Port of Eilat with eight UAVs.

Germany stated on 8 July that one of its aircraft which was a part of Operation Aspides, was targeted by a People's Liberation Army Navy warship with laser earlier in the month. On 10 July, a ballistic missile fired from Yemen was intercepted by Israeli air defenses in the morning, with the Houthis stating that they had targeted the Ben Gurion Airport. Another missile fired later fell short of Israeli territory.

On 16 July, a ballistic missile launched from Yemen was interecepted by Israeli air defenses. The Houthis claimed to have launched a Zulfiqar-type ballistic missile and UAVs at the Ben Gurion Airport, in addition to UAV attacks on a military installation in the Negev and the Port of Eilat. Another ballistic missile launched on 18 July was intercepted, with the Houthis claiming to have targeted the Ben Gurion Airport.

The IDF stated on 21 July that the IAF attacked Houthi military infrastructure and engineering equipment being used by the group for repairs at the Hudaydah Port using UAVs. Later, the IDF stated that a UAV apparently launched from Yemen was intercepted by the IAF. The Houthis claimed that they attacked five Israeli targets using five UAVs, including the Ben Gurion Airport, the Port of Eilat, the Ramon Airport and a target in Ashdod.

A ballistic missile launched from Yemen was interecepted by Israeli air defenses on 22 July, with Houthis claiming responsibility, stating that they targeted the Ben Gurion Airport. Another missile fell short outside Israeli territory. The US meanwhile sanctioned a Houthi-linked network of two individuals and five entities engaging in petroleum smuggling as well as evading sanctions.

On 25 July, a ballistic missile launched from Yemen was interecepted by Israeli air defenses, with the Houthis claiming to have targeted a sensitive site in the Beersheba area. Another ballistic missile was intercepted on 29 July, with the Houthis claiming to have targeted the Ben Gurion Airport.

== August 2025 ==
On 1 August, the IDF intercepted a ballistic missile launched from Yemen, with the Houthis claiming to have targeted the Ben Gurion Airport using a Palestine 2 hypersonic ballistic missile. On 5 August, another ballistic missile was intercepted, with the Houthis stating that they attacked the Ben Gurion Airport.

On 12 August, the IDF shot down a UAV near the coast of Eilat, with the Houthis claiming to have launched six UAVs at vital targets in Haifa, the Negev, Eilat and Beersheba. On 14 August, a missile launched from Yemen was intercepted by Israeli air defenses, with the group stating that it targeted the Ben Gurion Airport. Missile boats of the Israeli Navy struck the Haziz power plant near Sanaa on 17 August. A ballistic missile launched by the Houthis was later intercepted by Israeli air defenses, with the group claiming to have targeted the Ben Gurion Airport.

A ballistic missile containing a cluster bomb warhead and a UAV were launched from Yemen towards Israel on 22 August. While the UAV was intercepted, a bomblet from the missile fell in a yard of a home in Ginaton, causing minor damage. The Houthis claimed to have targeted the Ben Guiron Airport with the missile and sites in Tel Aviv and Ashkelon with two UAVs. The IDF later stated that the missile contained cluster munitions and on 24 August, the IAF struck a military complex housing the Presidential Palace of Yemen, a fuel depot and two power stations in Sanaa. Ten people were killed and 102 wounded in the attacks according to the Houthi-run Health Ministry.

On 27 August, a ballistic missile launched from Yemen was interecepted, with the Houthis claiming to have successfully hit the Ben Guiron Airport with a Palestine-2 type missile. On 28 August, the IAF carried out airstrikes on a compound in Sanaa targeting the Houthi leadership, killing Houthi Prime Minister Ahmed al-Rahawi and a number of other Houthi ministers. A ballistic missile launched by the Houthis on 30 August fell short outside Israeli territory. Eighteen UN staff members were arrested by the Houthis on 31 August. The group later accused them of espionage.

== September 2025 ==
On 1 September, a UAV launched from Yemen was intercepted before it reached Israeli territory. Two ballistic missiles launched from Yemen at Israel on 2 September fell short over Saudi Arabia, while a UAV was intercepted by the IAF before it reached Israeli territory. The Houthis claimed attacks on multiple sites in Israel, including on the headquarters of the General Staff of the Israel Defense Forces and the Ben Guiron Airport in Tel Aviv, a power station in Hadera and the Port of Ashdod.

On 3 September, a ballistic missile carrying a cluster bomb warhead was intercepted by the IAF in the morning. Another ballistic missile launched from Yemen was later intercepted. The Houthis claimed to have attacked Tel Aviv with a Palestine 2 ballistic missile with a cluster bomb warhead and another ballistic missile, in addition to attacking a sensitive Israeli target west of Jerusalem with a Palestine 2 missile and another vital target in Haifa with a UAV. Another ballistic missile launched on the following day fell short, with the Houthis claiming to have hit the Ben Guiron Airport with the Zulfiqar ballistic missile.

On 7 September, four UAVs were launched from Yemen towards Israel, with three being intercepted near the Sinai area. One of the UAVs however managed to hit the Ramon Airport, wounding eight people. The Houthis claimed to have launched eight UAVs towards Israel, with one targeting the Ramon Airport, three targeting two military targets in the Negev, one targeting a vital site in Ashkelon, one targeting the Ben Guiron Airport and two targeting a vital site in the Ashdod area. Three UAVs launched from Yemen were shot down over southern Israel by the IAF on the following day. The Houthis claimed to have targeted the Ben Guiron Airport, the Ramon Airport and a sensitive site in Dimona.

A ballistic missile launched from Yemen was interecepted by the IDF on 9 September, with the Houthis claiming to have attacked several sensitive targets in the Jerusalem area with a missile containing a cluster bomb warhead, in addition to attacking the Ramon Airport and two vital targets in the Eilat area using three UAVs. On 10 September, the IAF carried out airstrikes on Sanaa and Al Hazm in the Al Jawf Governorate. Al-Masirah stated that airstrikes targeted a medical facility in Sanaa, the National Museum of Yemen and other historical sites, and the local government compound in Al Hazm, while Israel stated that it targeted Houthi military camps, the public relations headquarters of the group and a fuel depot. The Houthi-run health ministry stated that 46 people were killed and 165 wounded in the attack. 31 journalists and media staff when a newspaper complex housing three Houthi-linked media outlets was struck according to the Committee to Protect Journalists.

On 11 September, a ballistic missile launched by the Houthis towards the Negev and Arabah areas and a UAV were intercepted. Another UAV was reported to have been The Houthis claimed to have targeted a site in the Negev with a Palestine 2 missile, as well as another site in the Negev with a UAV and the Ramon Airport with two UAVs. A ballistic missile launched from Yemen on 13 September was intercepted by the IDF, with the Houthis claiming to have targeted several sensitive sites in the Tel Aviv area using a missile with a cluster bomb warhead. On 15 September, the IAF stated that it intercepted a UAV launched by the Houthis, who claimed to have struck the Ramon Airport with three UAVs and a military target in the Negev using one UAV.

The IAF struck the Hudaydah Port on 16 September, with a ballistic missile launched by the Houthis being intercepted later. The group claimed to have targeted a sensitive site in Tel Aviv using a Palestine 2 missile, in addition to targeting the Ramon Airport using UAVs. On 18 September, a UAV launched from Yemen hit a hotel in Eilat, while two other UAVs and a ballistic missile were intercepted. The Houthis claimed to have attacked a sensitive military target in the Tel Aviv area with a missile, in addition to attacking targets in the Eilat area with three UAVs and a sensitive target in Beersheba.

The Houthis claimed to have launched several drones at targets in Eilat and Beersheba on 23 September. On 24 September, a UAV launched from Yemen struck a tourism center in Eilat and wounded at least 50 people. The Houthis claimed to have targeted two military sites in Eilat using two UAVs. A ballistic missile launched by the Houthis meanwhile fell short. On 25 September, the IAF carried out airstrikes in Sanaa, with the IDF stating that it struck five military headquarters, including the headquarters of the Houthi general staff and the propaganda department, and two weapon storage facilities. Al Masirah stated that they struck the Dhahban power station, areas in As Sabain and Ma'ain districts, and a residential neighborhood, killing eight people and wounding 142 others. A ballistic missile launched later by the Houthis was intercepted, with the group claiming to have launched a Palestine 2 missile armed with a cluster munition warhead at several sensitive targets in Tel Aviv.

A ballistic missile launched overnight on 28 September was intercepted by Israeli air defenses. The Houthis claimed to have attacked several sensitive targets in the Tel Aviv area using a missile containing a cluster bomb warhead, in addition to launching two UAVs against two vital targets in the Eilat area.

== October 2025 ==
A UAV launched by Houthis was shot down by the IAF on 1 October near the coast of Eilat. A ballistic missile launched from Yemen was interecepted on 5 October, with Houthis claiming to have attacked several sensitive targets in the Jerusalem area with a missile containing a cluster bomb warhead. A UAV launched by the Houthis was later shot down over Eilat. Four UAVs launched by the Houthis were intercepted near Eilat on 7 October. The Houthis meanwhile also detained nine more UN staff members. Two UAVs launched by the Houthis on 9 October were intercepted by the IAF.

On 16 October, the Houthis announced that Muhammad Abd al-Karim al-Ghamari, the Chief of the General Staff of the pro-Houthi faction of the Yemeni Armed Forces who had been targeted alongside other Houthi leaders in late-August 2025, had died, without disclosing the circumstances surrounding his death. The Israeli government claimed responsibility for his death.

The Houthis detained twenty UN workers on 19 October on accusations of espionage, while releasing another eleven after questioning. On October 25, the group detained two more UN staff members. The Houthis stated that many of those detained would be tried for links to the Israeli assassination of their leaders in August 2025.

Following the implementation of the ceasefire in the Gaza Strip in October 2025, the Houthis paused their attacks on Israel.

== See also ==
- Timeline of the Red Sea crisis (2024) – The war between Israel and Hamas as well as allied Palestinian groups that began concurrently.
- Hezbollah–Israel conflict (2023–present) - The conflict between Israel and Hezbollah that began concurrently.
