= March–May 2025 United States attacks in Yemen =

US-led aerial and naval strikes on Houthi targets in Yemen

Operation Rough Rider
- Part of the US–UK airstrikes on Yemen, Red Sea crisis, and Middle Eastern crisis (2023–present)
- US striking Houthi positions in Yemen on March 15
- Location: Houthi-controlled Yemen
- Commanded by: Donald Trump; Michael Kurilla; George Wikoff; Derek France
- Target: Houthis; Yemeni Army (SPC)
- Date: 15 March – 6 May 2025 (1 month and 3 weeks)
- Executed by: United States Armed Forces; United States Navy; United States Air Force; British Armed Forces (Note: From 30 April 2025); Royal Air Force
- Outcome: Inconclusive Status quo ante bellum: Houthis suffer casualties and material damage; Ceasefire leads to Houthis no longer targeting US ships while continuing to strike Israeli targets and commercial shipping until late September 2025.
- Casualties: US/Yemeni (PLC) estimate: 500–600 Houthis killed (up to 22 April); 153 civilians killed, 243 wounded (Pentagon assessment); Houthi claim: 123 people killed, 247 wounded (15 March to 15 April); 80 killed, 150+ wounded (on 17 April); Airwars estimate: 224 civilians killed US material losses: 2 Boeing F/A-18 Super Hornet fighter aircraft 7 General Atomics MQ-9 Reaper combat drones

In March 2025, the United States launched a large campaign of air and naval strikes against Houthi targets in Yemen. Codenamed Operation Rough Rider, it was the first large-scale US military operation in the Middle East during President Donald Trump's second term. The strikes began on March 15, targeting radar systems, air defenses, and ballistic and drone launch sites used by the Houthis to attack commercial ships and naval vessels in the Red Sea and Gulf of Aden. On 30 April 2025, the United Kingdom joined the United States in conducting strikes on Houthi targets.

The Houthi group began targeting international shipping in October 2023, after Israel invaded the Gaza Strip in response to the October 7 Hamas attacks. Claiming solidarity with Palestinians and aiming to pressure Israel into agreeing to a ceasefire and lifting its blockade of Gaza, the Houthis launched missiles and drones at vessels traveling near Yemen, and also fired ballistic missiles at Israeli cities, killing at least one civilian in Tel Aviv. In response, the United States, the United Kingdom, and a multinational coalition began Operation Prosperity Guardian, combining naval escorts with episodic airstrikes on Houthi military and civilian infrastructure.

By mid-March 2025, the Houthis had attacked more than 190 ships, sinking two, seizing another, and killing at least four seafarers. On March 18, Trump warned Iran—longtime backers of the Houthis—that further attacks would be considered acts of aggression, despite no direct involvement.

On May 6, President Donald Trump declared the strikes to be over, "effective immediately," as a result of a ceasefire between the US and the Houthis, brokered by Oman. The Houthis asserted that the ceasefire did not in "any way, shape, or form" preclude attacking Israel, which had just begun bombing Yemen.

== Background ==
Map of Houthi activity near the Yemeni coast as of 16 June 2024: Supreme Political Council (Houthis) Presidential Leadership Council (UN-recognized government of Yemen) Houthi strikes Houthi hijackings

The Houthis are a Shia Islamist military and political group located in Yemen, backed by Iran, and widely considered part of the Iranian-led Axis of Resistance. Emerging in the 1990s, they played a major role in Yemen's civil war, opposing the Presidential Leadership Council (SLC). The group took control over northern Yemen, including the capital, Sanaa, since 2014,

The Saudi-led coalition, backed by the United States, has fought against the Houthi Movement for over a decade. Since the October 7 attacks in October 2023, they have continued to target commercial shipping in the Red Sea using missiles, drones, and explosive-laden boats, forcing many shipping companies to reroute vessels around southern Africa at higher costs, in an attempt to force a ceasefire in the Gaza War and an end to the Israeli blockade of the Gaza Strip. Since November 2023, they have conducted over 190 attacks on shipping, sunk two vessels, seized another, and killed at least four seafarers, disrupting global trade. The Economist based in the UK reported that Red Sea cargo shipments had decreased by 70% in volume as a result of these strikes. It alleged that the Houthis had turned their strikes into a business model by requesting Protection racket payments from shipowners in exchange for safe passage, generating substantial revenue through blackmarket transactions and a form of maritime extortion.

The Houthis also conducted ballistic missile and drone attacks on Israeli cities, including Eilat and Tel Aviv, where a drone strike killed one Israeli. In response, the United States, the United Kingdom, and Israel, with support from a multinational coalition, launched attacks in Yemen to disrupt their capabilities.

While other members of Iran's Axis of Resistance—including Hamas, Hezbollah, and Syria—suffered major setbacks, the Houthis have used Yemen's geography to continue to fight against the Presidential Leadership Council. Following a ceasefire in Gaza-Israel in January 2025, they halted their attacks, but tensions resurfaced when they warned to resume strikes on targets in Israel if Israel disrupted humanitarian aid to Gaza again, which it blocked on 2 March. Following the aid block, the Houthis set a four-day deadline for border crossings to be reopened and aid to be allowed. The Houthis announced a resumption in attacks on 11 March after the demands were not met. The Houthis also fired a missile at a US Air Force F-16 and shot down a US MQ-9 Reaper drone. President Trump redesignated the Houthis as a foreign terrorist organization in January 2025.

In February 2025, CBS News reported that President Donald Trump and Defense Secretary Pete Hegseth had rolled back constraints on American commanders, allowing them to authorize airstrikes and special operations raids outside conventional battlefields. This broadened the range of people who could be targeted, with the Houthis being among the first under the new rule.

Weapons analysts have suggested that the Houthis may have acquired advanced drone technology, potentially increasing their operational range. Many of the militia's weapons are either manufactured in underground facilities or smuggled from Iran, their primary backer. Iran's enrichment of uranium to near weapons-grade levels remains a major international concern. Meanwhile, economic hardship in Iran has fueled domestic unrest.

== Prelude ==
Following Trump's election, Gen. Michael Kurilla, commander of the United States Central Command, proposed an 8–10 month bombing campaign based on Israel's operation against Hezbollah, where the US would strike Houthi air defenses before conducting targeted assassinations against senior Houthi officials. Saudi officials who supported Kurilla's proposal provided a list of 12 prominent Houthi leaders, stating that their assassinations would "cripple" the group. In early March, Trump partially approved Kurilla's plan, giving it 30 days to exhibit results in a campaign named "Operation Rough Rider" by Pete Hegseth.

On 13 March 2025, National Security Adviser Michael Waltz created a Signal group chat called "Houthi PC small group", for Trump administration officials to coordinate the attacks. The group included accounts that seemed to correspond to Marco Rubio, JD Vance, Tulsi Gabbard, Scott Bessent, Pete Hegseth, John Ratcliffe, Steve Witkoff, Susie Wiles, Joe Kent, and Stephen Miller. Waltz also accidentally added the editor-in-chief of The Atlantic, Jeffrey Goldberg. This incident became known as Signalgate.

On the morning of 14 March, Vance messaged the group asking for the attacks to be delayed by one month, saying: "I am not sure the president is aware how inconsistent this is with his message on Europe right now" and that the attacks "risk that we see a moderate to severe spike in oil prices". But Hegseth convinced Vance to continue with the attack, saying that the attacks were "not about the Houthis. I see it as two things: 1) Restoring Freedom of Navigation, a core national interest; and 2) Reestablish deterrence, which Biden cratered." Miller messaged at 9:35 a.m. ET that Trump had given approval for the attacks.

Trump authorized the attack plan, which had been in development for several weeks, with the final order issued on Saturday, 15 March. Some members of Congress received briefings from the White House the same day. At 11:44 a.m. ET, Hegseth messaged the group operational details of the attacks, including information about targets, weapons used, and attack sequencing.

== Strikes ==
=== First week (15–21 March 2025) ===
==== 15 March ====
CCTV footage showing the effect of US strikes in Sanaa

At least 40 air raids took place across Yemen, mainly in the capital of Sanaa and in Saada Governorate.

The eight strikes in Sanaa included one on a residential area that killed 15 people and injured nine others; one on the Sanaa International Airport, which houses a major military facility, with images showing black smoke billowing over the area; and four in the Geraf neighborhood of Shaoub district in northern Sanaa. Al-Masirah and other local media reported airstrikes in Sanaa at 1:30 p.m. ET.

Twelve strikes hit Saada, including one on a power station in Dahyan that caused a power outage. Military installations in Taiz were also struck. In Kahza, Ibb Governorate, Houthi media reported that 15 people were killed after American attacks hit two residential buildings. Eight strikes took place in Al Bayda Governorate, and further attacks hit Dhamar Governorate, Hajjah Governorate, and Marib Governorate.

The strikes, which US officials described as the largest military attack of Trump's second term, were carried out by fighter jets from the Nimitz-class aircraft carrier USS Harry S. Truman, stationed in the northern Red Sea, and United States Air Force attack planes and armed drones launched from regional bases. The BBC reported that the UK did not participate in the airstrikes but assisted in refueling.

After the initial strikes, Trump claimed on Truth Social that the Houthis were waging a campaign of "piracy, violence, and terrorism against American, and other, ships, aircraft, and drones", and vowed to use "overwhelming lethal force" until Houthi attacks on shipping cease. "No terrorist force will stop American commercial and naval vessels from freely sailing the Waterways of the World." He added, "Your time is up, and your attacks must stop, starting today. If they don't, hell will rain down upon you like nothing you have ever seen before." He also warned Iran to end its support for the Houthis, promising to hold the country "fully accountable" for the actions of the militant group.

Hegseth posted on X that "Houthi attacks on American ships & aircraft (and our troops!) will not be tolerated; and Iran, their benefactor, is on notice", adding that "freedom of navigation will be restored".

The Houthis described the attacks as a "war crime" and vowed retaliation. According to the Houthi-run health ministry, at least 53 people were killed, including five children and two women, and 98 others were wounded. The United Nations Children's Fund (UNICEF) independently determined that at least 2 children were killed in the attack.

Avatar of UNICEF Yemen

UNICEF Yemen
(@UNICEF_Yemen)
tweeted:

The UN verified that at least 2 boys aged 6 & 8 were among those killed by the airstrikes that targeted northern Saada 2 nights ago. A 3rd child was injured & the condition of a 4th child is yet to be confirmed. UNICEF calls for the protection of children & civilians at all times

17 March 2025

Waltz claimed that the attacks killed several Houthi leaders and indicated that the US would consider hitting Iranian targets in Yemen.

In the Signal chat, Hegseth said that the strikes had killed the Houthis' "top missile guy".

==== 16 March ====
Airstrikes hit military headquarters, weapon storage facilities, and detection equipment used to locate shipping. Al-Masirah reported two US strikes in Al Hudaydah.

Saudi news outlet AlHadath reported that the security chief of Houthi leader Abdul-Malik al-Houthi was killed in Saada.

The Houthis claimed that they targeted the aircraft carrier USS Harry S. Truman using 18 ballistic and cruise missiles and a drone. A US official said that a US aircraft shot down 11 drones launched by Houthis towards USS Harry S. Truman and a missile fired by Houthis failed in flight and splashed down into the sea. Later, the Houthis said that they fired missiles and drones towards USS Harry S. Truman and its several warships for the second time.

Institute for the Study of War reported that US airstrikes in Al Jawf Governorate killed three Houthi officials, including Commander Zain al Abidin al Mahtouri in al Hazm.

==== 17 March ====
Two early-morning air raids in the port city of Al Hudaydah hit a cotton ginning factory and the command cabin of the hijacked Israel-linked cargo ship Galaxy Leader, Houthi-aligned Saba News Agency reported. Saba also said strikes had damaged an under-construction cancer facility in Saada.

Another strike killed "Abu Taha" Zain al-Abidin Ali Abdullah al-Muhturi, a senior official in the Houthi internal security department, in the headquarters of the government complex in the city of Al-Hazm, the center of Al Jawf Governorate, northeast of Sanaa.

Other strikes hit the Al-Habashi Iron Factory in the Bajil district of Al Hudaydah Governorate and sites south of the presidential compound in Sanaa.

Lieutenant General Alex Grynkewich, US Joint Staff Director for Operations, said that more than 30 targets in Yemen had been struck since the bombing campaign began, killing dozens of Houthi militants.

Trump declared in a post that more Houthi attacks would be viewed as direct actions, or casus belli, by Iran that would incur severe consequences.

On the night of March 17/18, the United States launched a wave of strikes targeting Houthi and IRGC targets, reportedly inflicting casualties on both.

==== 18 March ====
Agence France-Presse was told by witnesses that three strikes were conducted in Saada in the late night.

==== 19 March ====
Houthi media reported that at least 10 strikes were conducted by the US in Sanaa and Al Hudaydah. Strikes also took place in As Safra, Saada, which is reportedly one of the most militarized Houthi strongholds, containing training bases and weapon storage facilities. According to Reuters, trenches and bunkers that were built to house Houthi leaders following former president Joe Biden's airstrikes in Yemen were also struck, forcing the group's leadership into hiding. US strikes on Sanaa injured seven women and two children in a residential neighborhood. Al-Masirah also reported strikes in Al-Sawadiya, southeast of Sanaa. ISW reported airstrikes on the Houthi's Communications Ministry and Postal Authority in Sanaa.

Pro-Houthi media reported that funerals were held in Sanaa for 16 slain militants.

==== 20 March ====
Al-Masirah reported that at least four US strikes hit the Al Mina district of al-Hudaydah, but later Houthi aligned media reported a total of five strikes in Al Hudaydah Governorate, including one hitting a cotton processing plant in Zabid, the cotton processing plant had allegedly been converted into a mines and explosive devices factory. US also conducted an airstrike near Safraa.

Yemen's Houthi-run health ministry said that a US airstrike hit a wedding hall which was under construction in Sanaa, injuring nine people, including women and children.

==== 21 March ====
Yemeni media reported that US fighter jets conducted six air strikes in At Tuhayta district including strikes reportedly targeting a Houthi military base in al Fazah-al Tuhayta. ISW reported a total of seven airstrikes.

=== Second week (22–26 March 2025) ===
On 22 March, AlHadath reported that a prior US airstrike on a naval base in Al Hudaydah wounded eight people, including Mansour al-Saadi, the commander of the Houthi naval forces.

Saba News Agency reported that the US conducted three strikes on Hodeida International Airport. Three Houthi commanders were killed in airstrikes in Majzar, Marib Governorate. A Houthi military base and ammunition depot was targeted in a US airstrike in Al Jawf Governorate.

On 23 March, the Houthi-controlled Health Ministry reported that one person was killed and 13 others, including three children, were injured in a US strike on a residential building in the Aser area of western Sanaa. Strikes were also reported in Saada, Al Hudaydah, and Marib. The strikes in western Sanaa reportedly targeted a Houthi ammunition depot. AlHadath reported that the person killed was a senior Houthi official. Saba News Agency reported a US attack on the Port of Salif. Saba news agency also reported US bombings in Sahar district and Kitaf wa Al Boqe'e district. It also reported that the US conducted five air attacks in Marib Governorate.

According to Michael Waltz, the attacks killed key Houthi leaders, including their "head missileer", and also targeted their headquarters, communication nodes, arms factories, and unmanned surface vehicle production facilities.

On 24 March, Saudi media outlet Al Hadath reported that a high-level Houthi official was killed in overnight US airstrikes in Sanaa.

On 25 March, Saba News Agency reported that US air strikes in the outskirts of Saada injured at least two people. Saba News Agency reported that a US strike hit a cancer hospital in Saada Governorate for the second time, destroying it. ISW reported a total of 12 airstrikes in Saada Governorate.

On 26 March, ISW reported that the US conducted at least 14 airstrikes against Houthi infrastructure and leadership.

The Houthi-linked Al-Masirah reported two US strikes in Saada Governorate. Al-Masirah reported US strikes in the Saada area, Al Salem district in Saada Governorate and Harf Sufyan district. Al-Masirah also reported more US strikes in Sanaa.

The Yemen Data Project reported that at least 25 civilians, including four children, were killed and at least 28 civilians were wounded in the airstrike campaign so far.

=== Third week (27 March – 2 April) ===
The Houthi-linked Al Masirah TV reported that four US attacks hit a stone quarry in the al-Arqoub area in the Khawlan district, killing at least two people and injuring two others. Al Masirah TV also reported that US strikes hit Sahlain and al-Salem areas of Saada Governorate. ISW reported at least 23 airstrikes in Yemen on 27 March.

On 27 March, a spokesman of the Air Force Global Strike Command confirmed that B-2 Spirit stealth bombers had been moved to an air base on the Diego Garcia atoll in the Indian Ocean. The base has been used in the past as a launch point for major operations in the Middle East, including the invasions of Iraq and Afghanistan. This is the first significant deployment of B-2s to Diego Garcia since 2020, and there was media speculation that it is connected to the US campaign in Yemen.

That happened five months after the Biden administration also used B-2s to strike targets in Yemen in hopes of compelling the Houthis to cease their attacks on shipping. On 16 October 2024, B-2s flying from RAAF Base Tindal in the Northern Territory, Australia, struck five underground weapons storage facilities owned by the Houthis. It was believed the strikes were also meant to demonstrate to Iran the US military's ability to destroy targets buried underground.

US aircraft striking an area in Sanaa on 28 March

On 28 March, Houthi media reported that a new series of US airstrikes throughout areas controlled by Houthis in Yemen, including neighborhoods in Sanaa, wounded at least seven people. It also reported that targeted areas included places where many of the Houthi leadership reside. ISW reported at least 44 airstrikes on March 28 including at least eight airstrikes targeting a Houthi military base, underground facilities and communication infrastructure in Jabal al Aswad, Amran Governorate as well as the Houthi military headquarters in Sanaa. Houthis published a list of 41 fighters that had been killed although the actual number of casualties was not disclosed. Several Houthi leaders were also reportedly amongst the dead. CENTCOM conducted eight airstrikes targeting three new Houthi military bases and ammunition depots in Sanhan District and also struck the Houthis' government complex in Hazm City.

On 29 March, Al Masirah reported that the US conducted at least 72 strikes, killing one person and injuring four others. United States Central Command said that it struck "Houthi positions".

On 30 March, Houthi media reported that US airstrikes hit Saada and Saada Governorate. It also reported that US airstrikes struck Sanaa, Sanaa Governorate and Al-Salem district. CENTCOM conducted an air strike on a vehicle on the N5 highway in al Tour, Hajjah Governorate killing two likely high ranking Houthi commanders.

On 31 March, ISW reported at least 62 airstrikes targeting Houthi infrastructure and leadership between 28 and 31 March. The Houthi-run Health Ministry said that US strikes which started on 15 March killed 59 people and injured 136 others. It also said that those killed include women and children.

The Houthis reported US airstrikes around Sanaa—where one person was killed—and in Hajjah Governorate, where a strike on a pickup truck killed two and injured a child. Footage from Al-Masirah showed broken glass in homes but did not show the target of the strikes. The militant group reported that 12 people were wounded in the strikes. Al Masirah reported that the US conducted four strikes on Jadr area in the Bani Al Harith district, killing at least one person and injuring at least five others. Saba News Agency reported that US strikes in Yemen one day prior extensively damaged Saada Governorate. Al Masirah reported citing Yemeni Health Ministry that US strikes hit the Bani Qais area, killing two people and injuring a child. Al Masirah reported two US strikes on Kamaran.

Houthis claimed that air defences shot down a US General Atomics MQ-9 Reaper above Marib Governorate.

On 1 April, ISW reported a total of at least 27 airstrikes targeting Houthi forces. Al Masirah reported that US carried out 15 strikes in Saada Governorate, including Saada, Maiz district, Sahar district and the Jarban area in Sanhan and Bani Bahlul district. United States Central Command said that it targeted Houthi positions. Al Masirah also reported that US carried out two strikes on Mount Nab Shuaib in the Bani Matar district. US conducted three airstrikes at al Dailami Airbase near Sanaa International Airport and also struck Kamaran island. Houthi media also reported airstrikes in Hajjah and Hodeidah.

On 2 April, ISW reported at least 22 airstrikes. The Associated Press reported that US strikes continued through the night into Wednesday, April 2. Houthi forces said that a strike targeted a "water project" in the Mansuriyah district, near Hodeida, killing at least four and wounding more. Houthi media also reported US strikes in Saada Governorate. Four airstrikes were conducted on Houthi training grounds in Mansuriyah District. Airstrikes were also conducted on Hudaydah Port and Kamaran. Al-Masirah reported that a US strike in the Ras Issa district of Al-Salif in the Al Hudaydah Governorate killed one person and wounded another person. Al-Masirah also reported a US strike in Saada. CENTCOM conducted an airstrike on 2 April on al Fazah in Hudaydah Governorate, killing 70 Houthi fighters including many mid-ranking Houthi military and intelligence officials and the al Tuhayta Axis Commander Najib Kashri and the Houthis' Red Sea Coastal Region Commander Abu Taleb, the whereabouts of the latter remained unknown while the former was confirmed to be killed.

=== Fourth week (3–9 April 2025) ===
On 3 April, ISW reported at least 28 airstrikes targeting Houthi forces and infrastructure. Al-Masirah reported that US fighter jets conducted more strikes, including a strike which hit a communications network in Jabal Namah, in the Jablah district of the Ibb Governorate, killing one person. It also reported that US forces conducted two strikes in the Kitaf wa Al Boqe'e district, and a strike on the Kahlan area east of Saada. Houthi-linked media also reported a US strike on a car in Majz district reportedly killing the personal assistant of Houthi Interior Minister Abdulkarim al Houthi. CENTCOM also struck a vehicle carrying Houthi fighters near Saada. US forces struck Houthi positions near Taiz Airport. Houthis claimed to have destroyed an American MQ-9 Reaper.

On 4 April, ISW reported at least 3 airstrikes conducted by CENTCOM. Al-Masirah reported that US fighter jets carried out bombings in al-Asayid area of Kitaf wa Al Boqe'e district and in Saada targeting command and control sites. A US airstrike killed a Houthi Police supervisor in Al Hudaydah Governorate. CENTCOM conducted at least two airstrikes targeting a Houthi military base in Kahlan. The Houthis said that they launched the drone and shot down a Giant Shark F360 reconnaissance drone over Saada Governorate with "a locally made surface-to-air missile".

On 5 April, Al Masirah reported that US fighter jets conducted two air strikes on the Kahlan area east of Saada. Yemeni media reported that four additional US airstrikes hit Saada. Al Masirah TV also reported that a US strike hit a solar energy store in the Hafsin area, west of Saada, killing two one person and injuring at least four others. United States Central Command said that its strikes targeted Houthi targets. CENTCOM conducted airstrikes on Houthi naval sites in Kamaran.

On 6 April, Al Masirah reported that US strikes in Saada had killed two people and injured two more. Al Masirah reported five strikes on Kamaran had targeted Houthi naval sites. The Houthi-run Health Ministry said a US air strike hit a house in Sanaa, killing four people including two women and injuring 16 others. Trump posted a video that purported to show an April 2 airstrike on Houthis, which pro-Houthi media said was actually an Eid al-Fitr gathering in Al Hudaydah Governorate of people not connected to the group. Moammar al-Eryani, the Minister of Information of the internationally recognised Yemeni government, said the strike killed about 70 Houthi members and some members of the Islamic Revolutionary Guard Corps. He offered no evidence for this claim. At least three airstrikes targeted Houthi underground facilities at al Sabaha military complex on Jabal Awsad.

On 7 April, ISW reported at least 26 airstrikes from 5–7 April including an unspecified number of airstrikes targeting a Houthi command and control site on 50th Street in Hudaydah. Al Masirah reported that three US strikes hit Al Ammar in the As Safra district and three other US strikes hit Bani Hassan area in the Abs district.

On 8 April, ISW reported at least 29 airstrikes including at least 9 strikes targeting three separate Houthi military bases in Marib Governorate, 11 strikes targeting two Houthi sites in Sanaa Governorate and two airstrikes targeting a Houthi weapons depot on Kamaran. The Houthi-linked Al Masirah TV reported a series of US strikes in Sanaa, six US attacks on Al Jumaimah area of the Bani Hushaysh district and on the Jarban area of Sanhan District. It also reported at least two strikes in Kamaran island. It later reported that more US attacks hit Sanaa Governorate and Marib Governorate. Saudi media outlet AlHadath reported that US strikes in Yemen killed the head of Houthi intelligence, Abdulnaser al Kamali in a targeted strike on his vehicle. Unnamed sources told AlHadath that two airstrikes hit Houthi weapons storing sites in Kamaran island and an ammunition depot in the al-Juba area of Marib Governorate. CENTCOM conducted an unspecified number of airstrikes targeting 13 Houthi military officials during a meeting at Sheikh Saleh al Suhaili's house in Sanaa, Houthi sources reported four dead and 25 wounded. Houthi-run Health Ministry reported that US strikes hit Amin Moqbel area of Hodeidah, killing two people and injuring 13 others. It said that multiple strikes hit "residential" district, so majority of the casualties were civilians. Houthi-affiliated media said that US strikes hit a telecommunications network in the Shawa area of Amran Governorate. Houthi-linked later reported that death toll increased to at least six deaths including at least three children and two women and 16 injuries and again later to 10 people killed and 16 others injured. ISW reported on 10 April that US had also conducted at least 10 more airstrikes on April 8 targeting a Houthi military base on Mount Nuqum wounding Houthi president Mahdi al Mashat and a senior Houthi intelligence official.

On 9 April, ISW reported at least 20 airstrikes including at least four airstrikes targeting communications sites in two sorties as well as strikes on a Houthi barracks in Hudaydah City. Houthi-run Health Ministry said that US airstrikes in As Sabain district of Sanaa killed at least three "civilians". Houthi media also reported several more strikes in Sanaa, including the Bani Hushaysh district. Houthis also reported US airstrikes in Kamaran island. However ISW later reported that the strike in As Sabain district actually may have killed a relatively more high-value Houthi leader, as it targeted a car between al Saleh Mosque and the gate of the Presidential Palace, and that the three killed were likely Houthi fighters. The Houthis claimed to have downed a General Atomics MQ-9 Reaper over Al Jawf Governorate.

=== Fifth week (10–16 April) ===
On 10 April, ISW reported 9 airstrikes including three airstrikes targeting Houthi underground facilities and weapons depots in Mount Nuqum in Sanaa and five more airstrikes targeting two other Houthi weapons depots around Sanaa as well as strikes on Houthi barracks and weapons depots on Kamaran.

On 11 April, ISW reported at least 11 airstrikes targeting Houthi infrastructure and leadership near Sanaa including one airstrike targeting Houthi underground facilities and weapons depots in Mount Nuqum. US fighter jets also conducted a wave of strikes in Houthi-controlled areas of Yemen including Sanaa, Faj Attan in Ma'ain district, Jabal Nuqum and Bani Hushaysh district. ISW later reported on 14 April that three airstrikes in Bani Hushaysh District struck Houthi weapons depots.

On 12 April, Al Masirah reported that US strikes hit several areas in Yemen including a vocational institute in As Sawma'ah district. It also reported that three strikes hit al-Salheen in Saada Governorate. ISW stated that five strikes took place in As Sawama'ah.

On 13 April, the Houthi-run Yemeni Health Ministry reported that US strikes hit a ceramics factory in Bani Matar district, killing seven people and injured 29 others including five children and a women, one of them seriously. It added that the victims were workers from a factory and residents of homes next to it. Al-Masirah reported that two US strikes targeted al-Yatmah in Khabb wa ash Sha'af district of Al Jawf Governorate. Two airstrikes struck a likely Houthi communications site in Baraa. The Houthis claimed that they shot down an US General Atomics MQ-9 Reaper over Hajjah Governorate with a locally made surface-to-air missile.

On 14 April, ISW reported at least 47 airstrikes between 11 and 14 April. Al-Masirah reported that 15 US strikes hit Raghwan district and Medghal district in Marib Governorate. Houthi-run Health Ministry said that US strikes in Yemen killed 123 people including children and women and injured 247 others.

On 15 April, ISW reported at least 27 airstrikes including at least seven airstrikes targeting Houthi barracks and depots on Kamaran as well as on military bases near the al Jawf Junction in Sanaa. Al Masirah reported that US air strikes hit Kamaran island and Az Zahir district. Al Masirah reported that at least 13 US strikes hit al-Salem and Kitaf wa Al Boqe'e district of Saada Governorate. It also reported that US strikes hit Harf Sufyan district and the outskirts of Sanaa.

On 16 April, ISW reported at least 39 airstrikes including 15 airstrikes on Houthi warehouses on Kamaran, 15 airstrike on underground bases in the Saada, five strikes on training camps in al Bayda Governorate and an unspecified number of airstrikes in Mayfaar Ans District and Harf Sufyan District. Al Masirah reported that one person was killed in a US strike in al-Nahda residential neighbourhood of al-Thawra district. It also reported that 14 US strikes hit al-Hafa area of As Sabain district. It added that three US strikes hit Bani Hushaysh district and US forces targeted Manakhah district and Al Hazm district. Yemeni media also reported that Saudi Arabia bombed the Shada'a District of Saada Governorate with artillery and missiles.

=== Sixth week (17–23 April) ===
On 17 April, ISW reported at least 30 airstrikes including 14 airstrikes targeting Houthi underground facilities at Mount Nuqum and six other airstrikes, elsewhere in Sanaa Governorate with one hitting building in Sanaa killing many fighters and two airstrikes targeting Houthi supply between Sanaa and eastern front As well as 10 airstrikes in Hudaydah Governorate with seven at the al Tuhayta axis. Al-Masirah reported that US fighter jets conducted more strikes in Al Munirah district. The US military said that it struck Ras Issa fuel port in western Yemen, saying that it was a Houthi fuel source. Al-Mashirah reported that the strike killed at least 80 people and injured at least 150 others.

On 18 April, ISW reported 19 airstrikes including 14 airstrikes targeting Ras Issa Port and three airstrikes targeting a Houthi command site in Mukayras District as well as two airstrikes in Arhab District. Al-Masirah reported that multiple US strikes hit the al-Hafa area of As Sabain district. It also reported four US strikes in Bani Hushaysh district. Al-Masirah also reported three US strikes in Saada Governorate. It also reported four US strikes in Bart Al Anan district and Khabb wa ash Sha'af district. The Houthis also claimed they shot down a US drone conducting "hostile acts" around Sanaa Governorate.

On 19 April, Al-Masirah reported four US strikes in Arhab district and also reported that US jets conducted 13 air strikes on Hudaydah Port and Hodeida International Airport. Al Masirah reported that a US strike in al-Thawra, Bani Matar and al-Safiah district of Sanaa killed three people and wounded four others. Houthi-affiliated Yemeni media reported that US conducted at least 29 air strikes throughout Yemen in the evening, targeting Sanaa Governorate, 'Amran Governorate, Marib Governorate and Al Hudaydah Governorate. CENTCOM also struck Kamaran Island and conducted a total of at least 13 airstrikes in Sanaa. The Houthis claimed that they shot down a US drone above Sanaa.

On 20 April, Al-Masirah reported US airstrikes in Kamaran island and Al Jubah district. Houthi media reported two US airstrikes in Attan area of Sanaa. It also reported that US airstrikes hit a sanitation project in Asr, Furwah and a popular market in Shaub district. The Houthis said that US strikes on a market in Sanaa killed 12 people, while strikes in al-Farwah wounded 30 people. They added that US strikes hit Saada Governorate. Two attacks in al Mahwit Governorate and Sanaa initially reported as US Air strikes were later shown to be unsuccessful missile launches by Houthis per OSINT.

On 21 April, ISW reported at least 113 airstrikes since April 18. ISW reported that 25 airstrikes targeted and struck Houthi infrastructure in al Tuhayta District. Al Masirah reported that US forces conducted three strikes on 'Amran Governorate, and two more on al-Jawba district of Marib Governorate. It also reported four other strikes on the Sarwah district of same governorate. US conducted four airstrikes targeting Houthi infrastructure on Kamaran and an unspecified number of airstrikes in Sanaa and in Barash Camp.

On 22 April, ISW reported at least 18 airstrikes including at least four strikes on Houthi barracks in Majzar District and four airstrikes targeting Houthi infrastructure in Sirwah District and two airstrikes targeting a Houthi communications site in al Husn District. Al-Masirah reported several US air strikes in Yemen including in Sanaa, the Brash area in Sanaa Governorate, Kamaran island, Majzar district, Sirwah district and Al Abdiyah district. Al-Masirah later reported a wave of US air strikes in Kamaran island, two in As Salif district and as-Saleem district in Saada Governorate. The Houthis claimed to have downed a US General Atomics MQ-9 Reaper conducting "hostile missions" over Hajjah Governorate.

On 23 April, ISW reported at least 22 airstrikes, including three on Houthi barracks in Majzar District and others on infrastructure in Hazm District and al Jawf district. At least four hit Houthi infrastructure on Kamaran, at least two targeted al Salif Port, and at least four targeted Hudaydah Airport. A Houthi communications site in western Taiz Governorate was also struck. Al-Masirah reported three strikes in Marib Governorate and four on the communications network in the Maqbanah district of Taiz Governorate.

=== Seventh week (24–30 April 2025) ===
On 24 April, ISW reported at least 27 airstrikes including: two on Houthi facilities in Sirwah District; at least six on Houthi sites in al Tuhayta District, and some in northern Sanaa on Houthi leaders. Al-Masirah reported 15 attacks: one attack in the Zaid neighbourhood of al-Jarf al-Sharqi, north of Sanaa, that damaged several houses and wounded one person; six attacks in the Brash area east of Mount Nuqum; six strikes in the Sahlin area of al-Salem district; and three attacks north of Saada. US strikes also killed the Houthi security commander for Majzar District. A CENTCOM spokesman said that the campaign had struck more than 800 Houthi targets, caused more than 650 Houthi casualties, and reduced Houthi missile attacks by 87 percent and drone attacks by 65 percent.

On 25 April, ISW reported a total of at least 28 airstrikes including: at least seven on Houthi infrastructure in Majzar and Madghal districts; at least 11 on Houthi sites in Bajil District, al Salif Port, and Kamaran; and others on Houthi sites in al Haymah, Manakhah, Bani Hashish, and Harib Nihm districts. Al-Masirah reported several US attacks throughout Yemen including: one in As Salif district; one on Kamaran island; two in Bani Hushaysh district; two in Harf Sufyan district; and four in Medghal district. The US military said, without evidence, that a Houthi missile exploded near the Old City of Sanaa. Al-Masirah reported at least six strikes on Bajil district; four in Takhiya area of Majz district; and one that hit a house east of Sahar district, killing a woman and injuring another person. US forces also carried out four strikes in Ras Isa area of As Salif district, and one strike in At Tawilah district. The US confirmed that the Houthis downed seven General Atomics MQ-9 Reapers.

On 26 April, US conducted five strikes at Ras Issa Port and Kamaran Island as well as additional strikes on command-and-control centers near the Presidential Complex in Sanaa and near Mount Yajoura, and also hit a house owner by a Houthi businessman in October 14 neighborhood of Sanaa.

On 27 April, Al-Masirah reported US strikes in Yemen including Ras Isa port in Al Hudaydah Governorate, the cargo vessel Galaxy Leader in Hudaydah Port, Kamaran island, Al Anan district of Al Jawf Governorate and Medghal district. Yemen's Houthi-run Health Ministry said that US strikes in As Sabain district killed two people and injured another, while nine others including two women and three children were injured in Bani Al Harith district. Al Mashirah later reported that at least eight people including women and children were killed in US strikes in the Bani Al Harith district, north of Sanaa. Saba News Agency reported two US strikes in Harf Sufyan district and two US strikes in Harf Sufyan district. US said that it struck 800 targets in Yemen since 15 March. United States Central Command claimed that the strikes killed hundreds of Houthi militants, and several Houthi leaders, including senior Houthi missile and UAV officials. United States Central Command also claimed that US strikes depleted Houthi capabilities to attack, saying that ballistic missile firing decreased by 69 percent, while drone attacks reduced by 55 percent. United States Central Command added that attacking Ras Isa stopped the Houthis from importing fuel via the port, "which will begin to impact Houthi ability to not only conduct operations, but also to generate millions of dollars in revenue".

On 28 April, ISW reported 56 airstrikes including 19 in Majzar and Madghal districts, Rabt al Anan and Nihm District, Sanaa Governorate and later reported three airstrikes targeting Harf Sufiyan and one targeting al Mahadhir. Three strikes struck Sanaa, one killing nine Houthi fighters including three senior officers. Al-Masirah reported that two US strikes hit Saada and two strikes hit Bart Al Anan district. Al-Mashirah and human rights organization Euro-Mediterranean Human Rights Monitor reported that US strikes hit a detention centre holding African migrants in Saada Governorate, killing at least 68 people and injuring 47 others. Amnesty International said the strike may be a war crime. An F/A-18 Super Hornet fighter jet assigned to Strike Fighter Squadron VFA-136 fell overboard from the USS Harry S. Truman and was lost at sea.

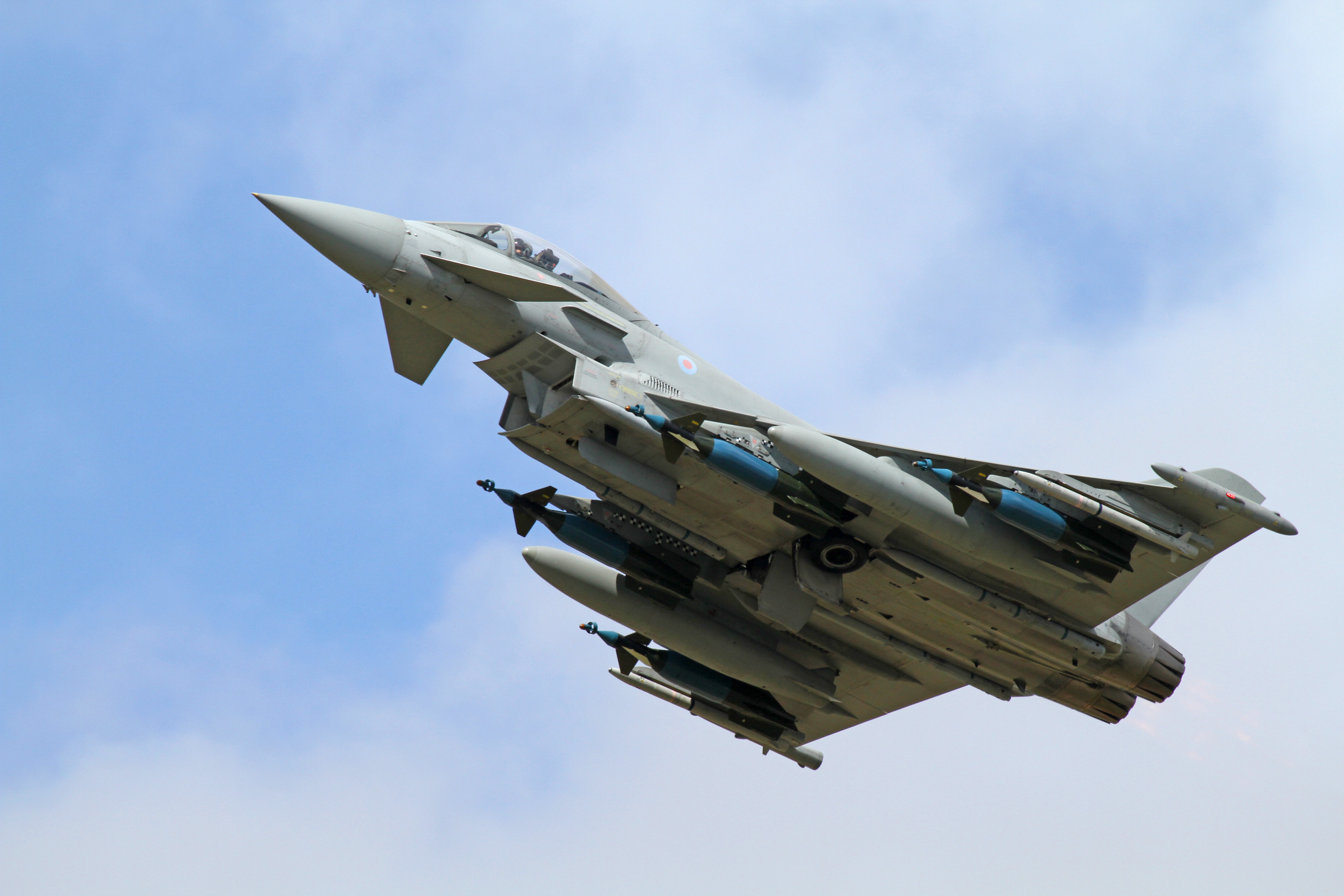
Typhoon FGR4

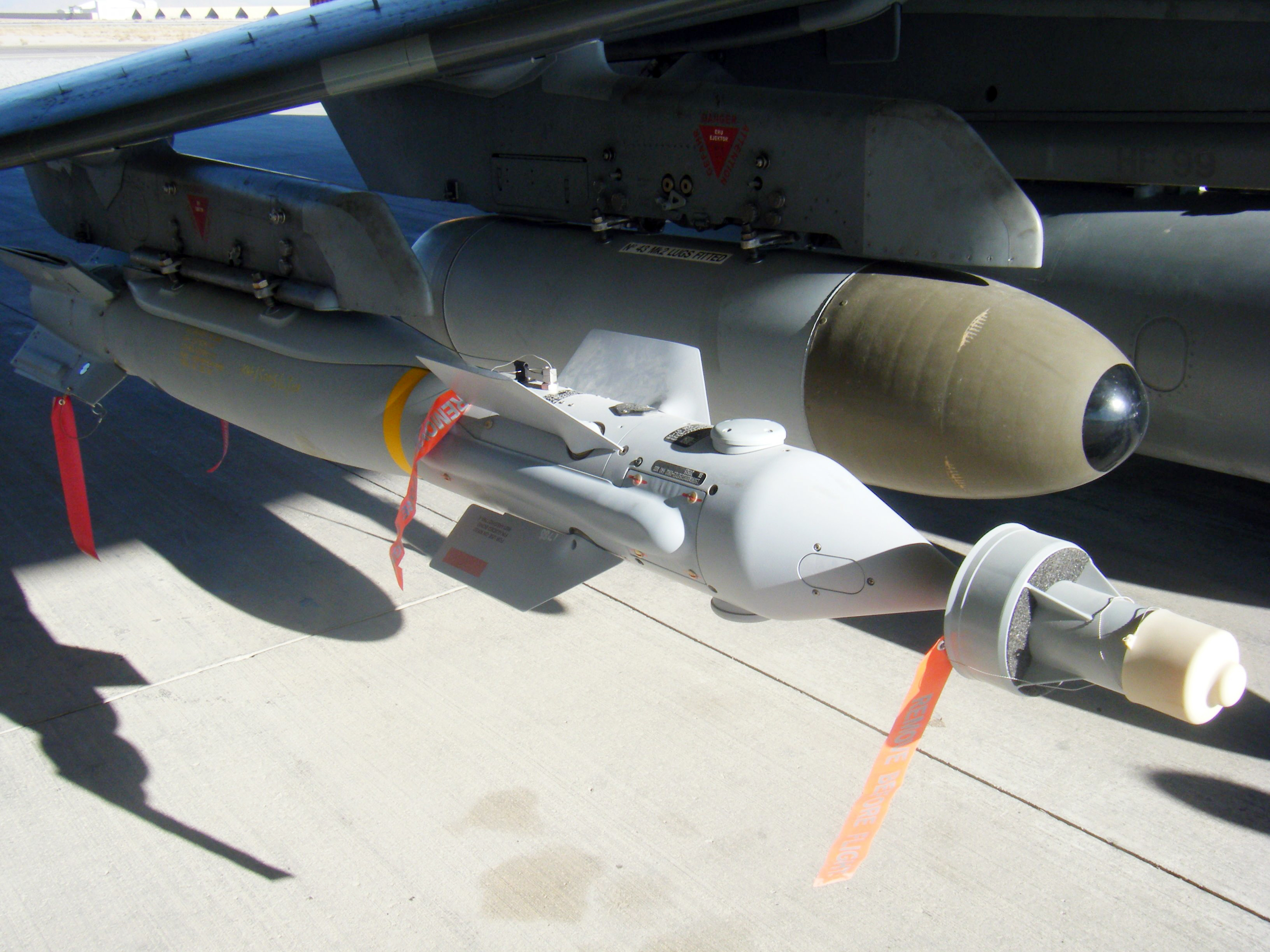
Paveway IV

On 29 April, ISW reported at least 17 airstrikes including four consecutive strikes struck a Houthi site in Maqbanah District and six strikes targeting Rabt Al Anan. It later also reported four airstrikes targeting Houthi infrastructure in Sahar District, three airstrikes in al Khalq and at least one airstrike targeting Mass military base in Madghal District as well as a strike on a "moving target" near a missile depot in al Suwadiya. Nine airstrikes took place in Saada Governorate. Al-Mashirah reported that US airstrikes targeted Bani Matar district, Bani Hushaysh district and Al Hasan, Yemen. The British Royal Air Force conducted its first operation during the campaign, targeting a cluster of buildings located 24 kilometers south of Sanaa. UK intelligence identified the buildings as a manufacturing center for Houthi drones used in naval attacks in the Red Sea. The operation, which involved Typhoon FGR4 fighter jets armed with Paveway IV guided bombs, involved "very careful planning ... to allow the targets to be prosecuted with minimal risk to civilians or non-military infrastructure" according to the British Ministry of Defense. The airstrikes were carried out at night to further reduce the chance of civilian casualties. British forces successfully carried out the operation and returned to base unharmed, while defense secretary John Healey later said in Parliament "initial assessment is that the planned targets were all successfully hit and we've seen no evidence of civilian casualties."

On 30 April, ISW reported at least 17 airstrikes. An airstrike targeted a Houthi site in al Hawak District and three airstrikes targeted Kitaf District. The UK Defense Ministry said that British forces took part in a joint operation with US forces against a Houthi target in Yemen. The Pentagon claimed that the US struck over 1,000 targets reducing their capabilities and killing several personnel.

=== Eighth week (1–6 May) ===
On 1 May, ISW reported at least 10 airstrikes. Six airstrikes took place in al Khab al Shaaf District. Later, ISW reported additional strikes, five in Saada, four in al Khab al Shaaf District, as well as strikes in Sanaa and Hamdan District, and in al Mahwit Governorate. Three airstrikes also struck Houthi sites in Asr and Mount Attan areas of Sanaa.

On 2 May, ISW reported at least 28 airstrikes. Al-Mashirah reported seven US strikes in Ras Issa oil port of As Salif district.

On 3 May, Saba News Agency reported that the US conducted overnight strikes on Sanaa, Bani Hushaysh district and Khabb wa ash Sha'af district. Al-Masirah reported two US air strikes on Kamaran island and As Salif district.

On 4 May, Al-Masirah reported US strikes throughout Yemen including 10 air attacks on Al Hazm district and five air attacks on Majzar district, Marib Governorate.

On 5 May, ISW reported a total of at least 108 airstrikes since 2 May including at least 57 in northeastern Yemen, 20 in Sanaa and additional strikes near Saada, moreover Kamaran, Ras Issa, and al Salif Port were struck at least five times. Saba News Agency reported reported 10 US strikes in and around Sanaa including two targeting Arbaeen Street in Sanaa and one on the airport road. The Houthi Health Ministry said that 14 people were injured in the Sawan neighborhood. Al-Mashirah reported three US air strikes in Khabb wa ash Sha'af district, two strikes on Sanaa's Attan area and two on Raghwan district. Israel and the United States launched a joint-operational attack on Yemen on the port city of Hodeidah, as a response to the Houthi bombarding the Gurion Airport in Israel. The IDF said that it carried out airstrikes in Yemen, saying that it is a response to Houthi ballistic missile attack on Ben Gurion Airport one day prior and previous attacks. The strikes conducted by IAF fighter jets targeted Houthi infrastructure along the coast of Yemen, including Hudaydah Port, and a concrete factory in Bajil, saying that they were used for militant purposes. Al-Masirah reported that an Israeli attack on a cement factory in Bajil killed two people and injured at least 42 others. Al-Masirah reported that US airstrikes hit Hodeidah's Ras Isa oil port in Hodeidah and another in the Al-Sawad area of Sanaa Governorate. Al-Masirah reported 10 US air strikes in Al Hazm, Yemen and two strikes in Sanhan and Bani Bahlul district.

On 6 May, ISW reported at least seven airstrikes including at least four airstrikes in al Sawad in Sanaa and three strikes on Ras Issa Port, all strikes occurred before the ceasefire agreement. For the second time during the bombing campaign, an F/A-18 Super Hornet fighter jet fell overboard from the USS Harry S. Truman and was lost at sea.

== Ceasefire ==
On 6 May 2025, US president Donald Trump declared an end to the strikes on Yemen, stating that they were over, "effective immediately," as a result of a ceasefire between the US and the Houthis, brokered by Oman. The Houthis agreed to halt attacks on vessels in the Red Sea but emphasized that the ceasefire did not in "any way, shape, or form" apply to Israel, which had just launched its own strikes on Yemen. While Trump framed the truce as the Houthis having "capitulated" and not "want[ing] to fight anymore," while also having shown "a lot of bravery," the Houthis claimed that it was in fact the US that "backed down." According to reports, Iran played a role in persuading the Houthis to reach a truce with the United States to help build "momentum" for the 2025 Iran–United States negotiations. According to Israeli officials, Israel was not given "advance notice" of the US-Houthi ceasefire. Israeli media described the ceasefire as "very bad news for Israel" and "doubly surpris[ing]". Following the ceasefire deal, Israeli prime minister Benjamin Netanyahu asserted that "Israel will defend itself by itself."

== Foreign involvement ==
Before the campaign, the UK had not officially acknowledged launching airstrikes in Yemen since May 2024. All previous British airstrikes were conducted during the tenure of UK prime minister Rishi Sunak and US president Joe Biden. At the start of the operation, the UK did not directly participate in the attacks but had provided support for US aircraft through "routine allied air-to-air refuelling." Declassified UK published an investigation on 18 March which showed that 53 people, including women and children, had died from US fighter jets aided by British aerial refuelling. The UK conducted its first operation during the campaign, which was also its operation under US president Donald Trump, on 29 April. The British defense secretary stated that the airstrikes were "in the interests of our national and economic security" and were to "prevent further attacks against UK and International shipping."

A Saudi official denied reports claiming Saudi Arabia was providing logistical support for US attacks on Yemen. Speaking to Al Arabiya, the official dismissed the allegations as "misleading" and stated that the kingdom was not supplying oil for the military operations. The dismissal came after reports that the UK assisted in refueling US fighter jets over Saudi Arabian airspace, while the Houthis vowed to take action "against any country that cooperates with the American enemy".

The Wall Street Journal reported that Israel provided intelligence from an individual in Yemen about a senior Houthi figure who would later be targeted in the March 15 airstrike, which was discussed in a group chat on Signal.

On 28 March, The New Arab reported that Houthi politburo member Mohammed Al-Farah accused UAE-allied separatist groups, including the Southern Transitional Council, of providing intelligence to the US military for their airstrikes, calling them "traitors" and stating that "the UAE's mercenaries stand out more than anyone else in their vileness and depravity." He threatened that if the separatist groups continued supplying intelligence to the US, his group would not only consider striking Mokha or Shabwa but could also strike Abu Dhabi and Dubai directly in response. The country was previously targeted by the Houthis in January 2022 in response to its involvement in the Yemeni Civil War.

== Reactions ==
=== Yemen ===
The Houthi political bureau called the attacks a war crime. Deputy head of the Houthi media office Nasruddin Amer said that "Sanaa will remain Gaza's shield and support and will not abandon it no matter the challenges." Another senior Houthi member told Al Arabiya said that the attacks violated Yemen's sovereignty and would be met with a "painful and deterrent" response. On 18 March, the pro-Houthi Yemeni Armed Forces stated that "the US aggression will not deter the steadfast and struggling Yemen from fulfilling its religious, moral, and humanitarian duties toward the Palestinian people", and reiterated the Houthis' demand for Israel to lift the blockade against the Gaza Strip.

The UN-recognized Presidential Leadership Council urged the international community to strengthen cooperation and adopt a comprehensive strategy to counter the Houthi militias and block their funding. The PLC stated that US strikes signaled a shift in the international approach to the Houthis, emphasizing that their threat now extends beyond Yemen and its neighbors, endangering global security and stability.

On 17 March, tens of thousands of protesters marched in support of the Houthis in Sanaa, Saada, Dhamar, Al Hudaydah, and 'Amran.

==== Houthi military response ====
On 16 March, the Houthis stated that they fired 18 ballistic and cruise missiles and a drone at USS Harry S. Truman and its carrier strike group. A US official claimed that 11 drones were intercepted by F-16 and F-18 fighter jets, while a Houthi missile malfunctioned and landed in the water. On the morning of 17 March, the Houthis claimed another strike on USS Harry S. Truman and surrounding warships, consisting of 18 missiles and a drone. On the morning of 18 March, the Houthis claimed a third attack on the aircraft carrier and surrounding warships, which US general Alexus Grynkewich said was hard to confirm since their attacks "were missing their targets by over 100 miles". A fourth attack on the aircraft carrier, consisting of cruise missiles and drones, was claimed by the Houthis on 19 March.

According to a May 2025 report from The New York Times, several American F-16s and an F-35 fighter jet were nearly struck by Houthi air defenses.

=== Iran and Axis of Resistance ===
Following the attacks, commander-in-chief of the IRGC Hossein Salami stated that the Houthis acted independently from Iran, and warned that "Iran will respond decisively and destructively if they take their threats into action", referring to Trump's threats against the country. The Iranian Ministry of Foreign Affairs called the attacks a violation of the Charter of the United Nations and international law. Foreign minister Abbas Araghchi said that America had no authority over Iran's foreign policy. The Supreme Leader of Iran, Ali Khamenei, condemned the US strikes on Yemen as a "crime that must be stopped".

In a letter to the UN Secretary-General António Guterres and the Security Council, Iran's permanent representative Amir Saeed Iravani stated that Trump and other US officials have made "reckless and provocative statements" containing "baseless accusations" and threats of force against Tehran. He dismissed claims made by Trump regarding Iranian support to the Houthis, accusing the US president of attempting to "unlawfully justify acts of aggression and war crimes against Yemen". He warned that any aggression against Iran would have severe consequences, for which the US would be fully accountable, and urged the Security Council to take serious note of inflammatory statements and ensure compliance with the UN Charter.

Lebanese militant group Hezbollah issued a statement condemning the attacks. Iraq's Harakat Hezbollah al-Nujaba also condemned the attacks and vowed to respond.

Iran described the strikes on the Ras Issa fuel port on April 17 as "barbaric" while Hamas called them "blatant aggression."

=== International ===
United Nations secretary-general António Guterres called for a cessation of military activities in the region and warned that an escalation could destabilize Yemen and worsen the nation's humanitarian situation.

Russian foreign minister Sergey Lavrov called for an end to the strikes and urged for diplomatic talks to find a peaceful solution during a call with his US counterpart Marco Rubio. Chinese foreign ministry spokesperson Mao Ning called for dialogue and a deescalation, while affirming China's position against a military escalation in the region. North Korean Ambassador to Egypt, Ma Dong-hee, who is also accredited to Yemen, condemns the attacks as a US threat to regional and global order.

In November 2026, 12 organizations, including Airwars, Amnesty International USA, and the Center for Civilians in Conflict, issued a statement calling for investigations into the killing of civiliains during the attacks.

== Military plan leak ==
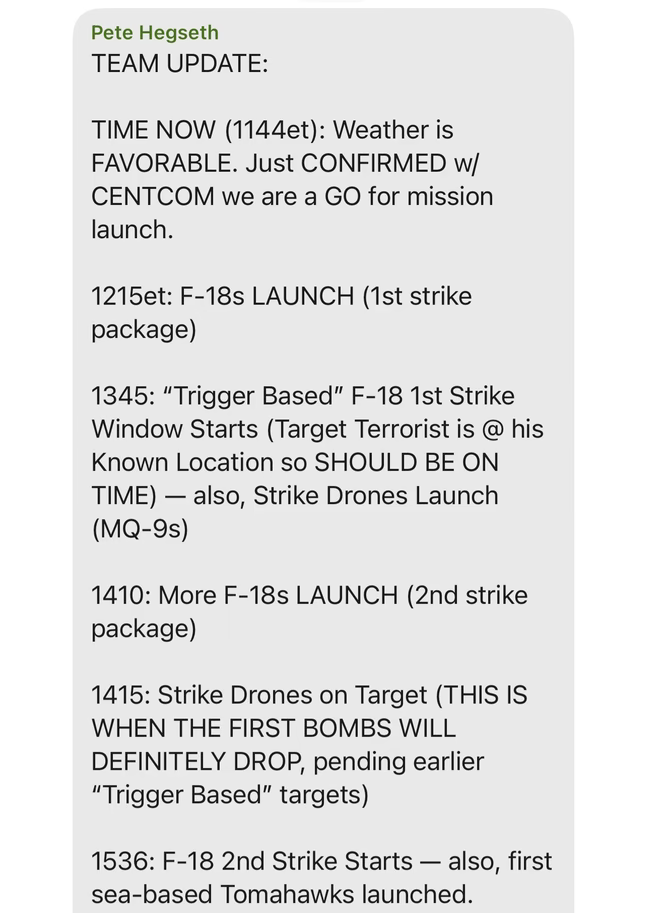

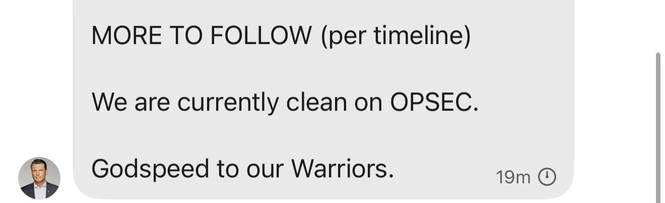
Screenshots from the leaked chat showing Pete Hegseth discussing plans for the attacks

The addition of Atlantic editor-in-chief Jeffrey Goldberg to Waltz's Signal chat group, and the subsequent revelation that Hegseth had sent attack plans in an unsecure platform, drew widespread criticism.

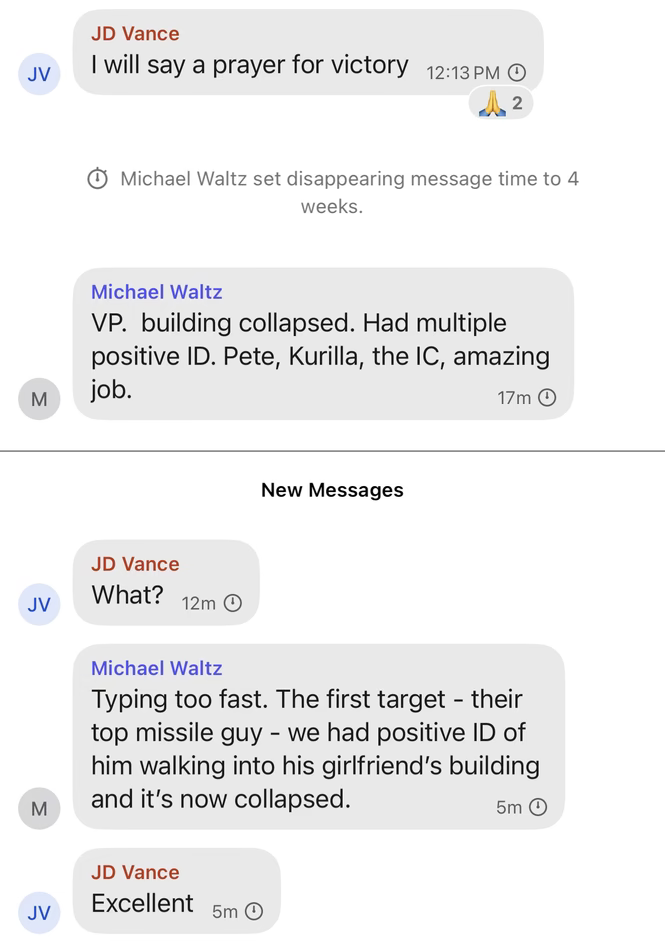
A screenshot of the leaked chat showing Michael Waltz and JD Vance discussing the result of the attacks

Some national security experts suggested that the coordination of the attacks over Signal likely violated the Espionage Act and the Federal Records Act. When questioned by reporters on 24 March, the day Goldberg's article about the leak was published, Hegseth responded, "Nobody was texting war plans, and that's all I have to say about that." Hegseth also described Goldberg as "deceitful and highly discredited".

=== Reactions of US politicians ===
On March 24, 2025, House minority leader Hakeem Jeffries called for a Congressional investigation to be opened to understand how this operational security breach occurred. Jeffries called the incident "reckless, irresponsible and dangerous".

Following confirmation by a spokesperson for the National Security Council that the leaked group chat was real, White House Press Secretary Karoline Leavitt stated, "As President Trump said, the attacks on the Houthis have been highly successful and effective, President Trump continues to have the utmost confidence in his national security team, including National Security Advisor Mike Waltz".

Chairman of the Senate Armed Services Committee, Republican Senator Roger Wicker responded to the leak stating, "We're very concerned about it and we'll be looking into it on a bipartisan basis."

== Analysis ==
The expert think tank Atlantic Council expressed doubt about the practicality of United States war aims. It stated that it will be challenging to track down Houthi leader Abdul-Malik al-Houthi due to "limited intelligence on the ground in Yemen," adding that this is the same reason behind the US's "difficulty assessing the success of its operations" throughout its Red Sea operations in 2024.

The New York Times concluded that America had failed to establish air superiority over Ansar Allah while burning through ammunition reserves.

The Hill opinionated that the Houthis will become stronger.

An article in Responsible Statecraft claimed there is hypocrisy in Trump policies for paying for war that Europe mostly benefits from. Europe is mostly affected by the shipping lane disruption, while the US paid the cost of the bombings.

An article by Middle East Monitor, a Qatar-funded pro-Hamas lobbying group, claims that the US failed to meet its strategic goals.

== Aftermath ==
The bombing campaign had difficulty destroying the Houthis' underground arsenal of missiles, drones and launchers. The cost of the bombing campaign has been estimated to cost billions.

After the ceasefire with the US was declared the Houthis fired ballistic missiles at Israel.

In July 2025, the Houthis resumed attacks on commercial shipping, sinking two Liberian-flagged vessels. In response, the EU launched Operation Aspides to provide limited protection to vessels using the Red Sea.

== See also ==
- 2025 Israeli attacks in Yemen
- 30 May 2024 Yemen strikes
- 2026 Iran war
- 2026 Lebanon war
- 2026 Houthi strikes on Israel
- Iranian support for the Houthis
- Galaxy Leader
