= Al Hazm =

Al Hazm or Al-Hazm may refer to:

- Al Hazm (football club), a Saudi football team
- Al Hazm Club Stadium, a Saudi football stadium
- Al Hazm, Makkah, a village in Saudi Arabia
- Al Hazm district, Yemen
- Al Hazm, Yemen
