= Al-Buqa' =

al-Buqa'
- Location in Yemen
- Country: Yemen
- Governate: Sa'dah
- District: Kitaf wa Al Boqe'e District
- Time zone: UTC+3:00 (MST)

al-Buqa' is an 'Uzlah in Kitaf wa Al Boqe'e District, Saada Governorate, Yemen.

The location of al-Buqa' in Yemen.

== History ==
The area was allegedly used as Saudi training grounds for child soldiers in the 21st century.

== Geography ==
al-Buqa' is one of the northernmost areas in Yemen; a nearby border crossing into Saudi Arabia was a war zone between the two countries in the Saudi War in Yemen.
