= Sarfah and Dajah =

Sarfah and Dajah صرفة ودجة
- Sub-district
- Location in Yemen
- Country: Yemen
- Governorate: Sana'a
- District: Sanhan and Bani Bahlul

Population (2004)
  - Total: 2,541
- Time zone: UTC+3

Sarfah and Dajah (Arabic: صرفة ودجة) is a sub-district located in Sanhan and Bani Bahlul District, Sana'a Governorate, Yemen. Sarfah and Dajah had a population of 2541 according to the 2004 census.
