= Sanhan =

Sanhan may refer to:

- Samhan, a period of Korean history
- Sanhan and Bani Bahlul district, Yemen
