= Khams al-Wadi al-Awsat =

Khams al-Wadi al-Awsat خمس الوادي الأوسط
- Sub-district
- Location in Yemen
- Country: Yemen
- Governorate: Sana'a
- District: Sanhan and Bani Bahlul

Population (2004)
  - Total: 4,176
- Time zone: UTC+3

Khams al-Wadi al-Awsat (Arabic: خمس الوادي الأوسط) is a sub-district located in Sanhan and Bani Bahlul District, Sana'a Governorate, Yemen. Khams al-Wadi al-Awsat had a population of 4176 according to the 2004 census.
