= Al-Magharb al-Allya =

Al-Magharb al-Allya المغارب العليا
- Sub-district
- Location in Yemen
- Coordinates: 15.14043°N 43.68165°E
- Country: Yemen
- Governorate: Sana'a
- District: Manakhah

Population (2004)
  - Total: 3,591
- Time zone: UTC+3

Al-Magharb al-Allya (Arabic: المغارب العليا) is a sub-district located in Manakhah District, Sana'a Governorate, Yemen. Al-Magharb al-Allya had a population of 3591 according to the 2004 census.
