= Al-Hams al-Adani =

Al-Hams al-Adani الحمس العدني
- Sub-district
- Location in Yemen
- Coordinates: 15°14′30″N 44°22′26″E
- Country: Yemen
- Governorate: Sana'a
- District: Sanhan and Bani Bahlul

Population (2004)
  - Total: 4,421
- Time zone: UTC+3

Al-Hams al-Adani (Arabic: الحمس العدني) is a sub-district located in Sanhan and Bani Bahlul District, Sana'a Governorate, Yemen. Al-Hams al-Adani had a population of 4421 according to the 2004 census.
