= Al-Rawnah =

Al-Rawnah الرونة
- Sub-district
- Location in Yemen
- Coordinates: 15°25′01″N 44°20′02″E
- Country: Yemen
- Governorate: Sana'a
- District: Bani Hushaysh

Population (2004)
  - Total: 4,596
- Time zone: UTC+3

Al-Rawnah (Arabic: الرونة) is a sub-district located in Bani Hushaysh District, Sana'a Governorate, Yemen. Al-Rawnah had a population of 4596 according to the 2004 census.
