= Wadi Jabib =

Wadi Jabib وادي جبيب
- Sub-district
- Location in Yemen
- Country: Yemen
- Governorate: Sana'a
- District: Sanhan and Bani Bahlul

Population (2004)
  - Total: 4,383
- Time zone: UTC+3

Wadi Jabib (Arabic: وادي جبيب) is a sub-district located in Sanhan and Bani Bahlul District, Sana'a Governorate, Yemen. Wadi Jabib had a population of 4383 according to the 2004 census.
