= Al-Ya'abr =

Al-Ya'abr اليعابر
- Sub-district
- Location in Yemen
- Coordinates: 15.05182°N 43.7495°E
- Country: Yemen
- Governorate: Sana'a
- District: Manakhah

Population (2004)
  - Total: 1,087
- Time zone: UTC+3

Al-Ya'abr (Arabic: اليعابر) is a sub-district located in Manakhah District, Sana'a Governorate, Yemen. Al-Ya'abr had a population of 1087 according to the 2004 census.
