= Al-Sharafh =

Al-Sharafh الشرفة
- Sub-district
- Location in Yemen
- Coordinates: 15°29′19″N 44°28′44″E
- Country: Yemen
- Governorate: Sana'a
- District: Bani Hushaysh

Population (2004)
  - Total: 10,436
- Time zone: UTC+3

Al-Sharafh (Arabic: الشرفة) is a sub-district located in Bani Hushaysh District, Sana'a Governorate, Yemen. Al-Sharafh had a population of 10436 according to the 2004 census.
