= Bani Ismail =

Bani Ismail بني إسماعيل
- Sub-district
- Location in Yemen
- Coordinates: 15°12′39″N 43°38′17″E
- Country: Yemen
- Governorate: Sana'a
- District: Manakhah

Population (2004)
  - Total: 4,989
- Time zone: UTC+3

Bani Ismail (Arabic: بني إسماعيل) is a sub-district located in Manakhah District, Sana'a Governorate, Yemen. Bani Ismail had a population of 4989 according to the 2004 census.
