= Habab Al Hantash =

Coordinates: 15°20′32″N 44°49′12″E

Habab Al Hantash حباب آل حنتش
- Sub-district
- Location in Yemen
- Country: Yemen
- Governorate: Sana'a
- District: Khawlan

Population (2004)
  - Total: 2,526
- Time zone: UTC+3

Habab Al Hantash (Arabic: حباب آل حنتش) is a sub-district located in Khawlan District, Sana'a Governorate, Yemen. Habab Al Hantash had a population of 2526 according to the 2004 census.
