= Manakhah (Sanaa) =

Manakhah مناخة
- Sub-district
- Location in Yemen
- Country: Yemen
- Governorate: Sana'a
- District: Manakhah

Population (2004)
  - Total: 7,098
- Time zone: UTC+3

Manakhah (Arabic: مناخة) is a sub-district located in Manakhah District, Sana'a Governorate, Yemen. Manakhah had a population of 7098 according to the 2004 census.
