= Al-Farwat =

Al-Farwat الفروات
- Sub-district
- Location in Yemen
- Coordinates: 15°07′39″N 44°17′57″E
- Country: Yemen
- Governorate: Sana'a
- District: Sanhan and Bani Bahlul

Population (2004)
  - Total: 8,540
- Time zone: UTC+3

Al-Farwat (Arabic: الفروات) is a sub-district located in Sanhan and Bani Bahlul District, Sana'a Governorate, Yemen. Al-Farwat had a population of 8540 according to the 2004 census.
