= Da'wah (Sanaa) =

Da'wah دعوة
- Sub-district
- Location in Yemen
- Country: Yemen
- Governorate: Sana'a
- District: Manakhah

Population (2004)
  - Total: 1,624
- Time zone: UTC+3

Da'wah (Arabic: دعوة) is a sub-district located in Manakhah District, Sana'a Governorate, Yemen. Da'wah had a population of 1624 according to the 2004 census.
