= Iyal Malik =

Iyal Malik عيال مالك
- Sub-district
- Location in Yemen
- Coordinates: 15.49262°N 44.42172°E
- Country: Yemen
- Governorate: Sana'a
- District: Bani Hushaysh

Population (2004)
  - Total: 11,057
- Time zone: UTC+3

Iyal Malik (Arabic: عيال مالك) is a sub-district located in Bani Hushaysh District, Sana'a Governorate, Yemen. Iyal Malik had a population of 11057 according to the 2004 census.
