= Anaqah =

Anaqah عناقة
- Sub-district
- Location in Yemen
- Coordinates: 15°18′53″N 44°24′45″E
- Country: Yemen
- Governorate: Sana'a
- District: Sanhan and Bani Bahlul

Population (2004)
  - Total: 1,365
- Time zone: UTC+3

Anaqah (Arabic: عناقة) is a sub-district located in Sanhan and Bani Bahlul District, Sana'a Governorate, Yemen. Anaqah had a population of 1365 according to the 2004 census.

== Education ==
Anaqah contains a high school and an education center.
