= Al-Raba al-Gharbi =

Al-Raba al-Gharbi الربع الغربي
- Sub-district
- Location in Yemen
- Coordinates: 15°12′55″N 44°15′12″E
- Country: Yemen
- Governorate: Sana'a
- District: Sanhan and Bani Bahlul

Population (2004)
  - Total: 23,690
- Time zone: UTC+3

Al-Raba al-Gharbi (Arabic: الربع الغربي) is a sub-district located in Sanhan and Bani Bahlul District, Sana'a Governorate, Yemen. Al-Raba al-Gharbi had a population of 23,690 according to the 2004 census.
