= Khums Wadi Janah =

Khums Wadi Janah خمس وادي جناح
- Sub-district
- Location in Yemen
- Country: Yemen
- Governorate: Sana'a
- District: Sanhan and Bani Bahlul

Population (2004)
  - Total: 1,976
- Time zone: UTC+3

Khums Wadi Janah (Arabic: خمس وادي جناح) is a sub-district located in Sanhan and Bani Bahlul District, Sana'a Governorate, Yemen. Khums Wadi Janah had a population of 1976 according to the 2004 census.
