= Al-Sads and Bani Atta =

Al-Sads and Bani Atta السدس وبني عطاء
- Sub-district
- Location in Yemen
- Coordinates: 15°05′43″N 43°46′04″E
- Country: Yemen
- Governorate: Sana'a
- District: Manakhah

Population (2004)
  - Total: 1,962
- Time zone: UTC+3

Al-Sads and Bani Atta (Arabic: السدس وبني عطاء) is a sub-district located in Manakhah District, Sana'a Governorate, Yemen. Al-Sads and Bani Atta had a population of 1962 according to the 2004 census.
