= Qa'a al-Hibab =

Qa'a al-Hibab قاع الحباب
- Sub-district
- Location in Yemen
- Coordinates: 15.2984°N 44.28468°E
- Country: Yemen
- Governorate: Sana'a
- District: Sanhan and Bani Bahlul

Population (2004)
  - Total: 857
- Time zone: UTC+3

Qa'a al-Hibab (Arabic: قاع الحباب) is a sub-district located in Sanhan and Bani Bahlul District, Sana'a Governorate, Yemen. Qa'a al-Hibab had a population of 857 according to the 2004 census.
