= Bani Ishaq =

Bani Ishaq بني إسحاق
- Sub-district
- Location in Yemen
- Coordinates: 15°12′54″N 43°36′03″E
- Country: Yemen
- Governorate: Sana'a
- District: Manakhah

Population (2004)
  - Total: 1,722
- Time zone: UTC+3

Bani Ishaq (Arabic: بني إسحاق) is a sub-district located in Manakhah District, Sana'a Governorate, Yemen. Bani Ishaq had a population of 1722 according to the 2004 census.
