= Rajm (Sanaa) =

Rajam رجام
- Sub-district
- Location in Yemen
- Country: Yemen
- Governorate: Sana'a
- District: Bani Hushaysh

Population (2004)
  - Total: 13,146
- Time zone: UTC+3

Rajam (Arabic: رجام) is a sub-district located in Bani Hushaysh District, Sana'a Governorate, Yemen. Rajam had a population of 13146 according to the 2004 census.
