= Al-Khums al-Khams =

Al-Khums al-Khams الخمس الخامس
- Sub-district
- Location in Yemen
- Coordinates: 15.27062°N 44.34192°E
- Country: Yemen
- Governorate: Sana'a
- District: Sanhan and Bani Bahlul

Population (2004)
  - Total: 1,303
- Time zone: UTC+3

Al-Khums al-Khams (Arabic: الخمس الخامس) is a sub-district located in Sanhan and Bani Bahlul District, Sana'a Governorate, Yemen. Al-Khums al-Khams had a population of 1303 according to the 2004 census.
