= Bani Muqatl =

Bani Muqatl بني مقاتل
- Sub-district
- Location in Yemen
- Coordinates: 15°02′33″N 43°47′35″E
- Country: Yemen
- Governorate: Sana'a
- District: Manakhah

Population (2004)
  - Total: 3,842
- Time zone: UTC+3

Bani Muqatl (Arabic: بني مقاتل) is a sub-district located in Manakhah District, Sana'a Governorate, Yemen. Bani Muqatl had a population of 3842 according to the 2004 census.
