= Al-Magharb al-Sufla =

Al-Magharb al-Sufla المغارب السفلى
- Sub-district
- Location in Yemen
- Coordinates: 15.14421°N 43.6379°E
- Country: Yemen
- Governorate: Sana'a
- District: Manakhah

Population (2004)
  - Total: 2,080
- Time zone: UTC+3

Al-Magharb al-Sufla (Arabic: المغارب السفلى) is a sub-district located in Manakhah District, Sana'a Governorate, Yemen. Al-Magharb al-Sufla had a population of 2080 according to the 2004 census.
