= Sa'awan =

Sa'awan سعوان
- Sub-district
- Location in Yemen
- Country: Yemen
- Governorate: Sana'a
- District: Bani Hushaysh

Population (2004)
  - Total: 9,199
- Time zone: UTC+3

Sa'awan (Arabic: سعوان) is a sub-district located in Bani Hushaysh District, Sana'a Governorate, Yemen. Sa'awan had a population of 9199 according to the 2004 census.
