= Hawzan =

Hawzan هوزان
- Sub-district
- Location in Yemen
- Country: Yemen
- Governorate: Sana'a
- District: Manakhah

Population (2004)
  - Total: 5,940
- Time zone: UTC+3

Hawzan (Arabic: هوزان) is a sub-district located in Manakhah District, Sana'a Governorate, Yemen. Hawzan had a population of 5940 according to the 2004 census.
