= Al-Makir al-Laghba =

Al-Makir al-Lagh المكير اللغباء
- Sub-district
- Location in Yemen
- Coordinates: 15°19′00″N 44°52′47″E
- Country: Yemen
- Governorate: Sana'a
- District: Khawlan

Population (2004)
  - Total: 2,601
- Time zone: UTC+3

Al-Makir al-Lagh (Arabic: المكير اللغباء) is a sub-district located in Khawlan District, Sana'a Governorate, Yemen. Al-Makir al-Lagh had a population of 2601 according to the 2004 census.
