= Bani Shadad =

Bani Shadad بني شداد
- Sub-district
- Location in Yemen
- Coordinates: 15°17′01″N 44°37′36″E
- Country: Yemen
- Governorate: Sana'a
- District: Khawlan

Population (2004)
  - Total: 13,807
- Time zone: UTC+3

Bani Shadad (Arabic: بني شداد) is a sub-district located in Khawlan District, Sana'a Governorate, Yemen. Bani Shadad had a population of 13807 according to the 2004 census.
