= Hasban =

Hasban حصبان
- Sub-district
- Location in Yemen
- Country: Yemen
- Governorate: Sana'a
- District: Manakhah

Population (2004)
  - Total: 6,715
- Time zone: UTC+3

Hasban (Arabic: حصبان) is a sub-district located in Manakhah District, Sana'a Governorate, Yemen. Hasban had a population of 6715 according to the 2004 census.
