= Bani Khatab =

Bani Khatab بني خطاب
- Sub-district
- Location in Yemen
- Coordinates: 15°07′35″N 43°43′31″E
- Country: Yemen
- Governorate: Sana'a
- District: Manakhah

Population (2004)
  - Total: 4,822
- Time zone: UTC+3

Bani Khatab (Arabic: بني خطاب) is a sub-district located in Manakhah District, Sana'a Governorate, Yemen. Bani Khatab had a population of 4822 according to the 2004 census.
