= Dhi Marmar =

Dhi Marmar ذي مرمر
- Sub-district
- Location in Yemen
- Country: Yemen
- Governorate: Sana'a
- District: Bani Hushaysh

Population (2004)
  - Total: 8,178
- Time zone: UTC+3

Dhi Marmar (Arabic: ذي مرمر) is a sub-district located in Bani Hushaysh District, Sana'a Governorate, Yemen. Dhi Marmar had a population of 8178 according to the 2004 census.
