= Bani Barh =

Bani Barh بني برة
- Sub-district
- Location in Yemen
- Coordinates: 15°10′48″N 43°37′08″E
- Country: Yemen
- Governorate: Sana'a
- District: Manakhah

Population (2004)
  - Total: 2,861
- Time zone: UTC+3

Bani Barh (Arabic: بني برة) is a sub-district located in Manakhah District, Sana'a Governorate, Yemen. Bani Barh had a population of 2861 according to the 2004 census.
