= Bani Hassan and Hussein =

Bani Hassan and Hussein بني حسن وحسين
- Sub-district
- Location in Yemen
- Coordinates: 15°10′54″N 43°34′21″E
- Country: Yemen
- Governorate: Sana'a
- District: Manakhah

Population (2004)
  - Total: 3,991
- Time zone: UTC+3

Bani Hassan and Hussein (Arabic: بني حسن وحسين) is a sub-district located in Manakhah District, Sana'a Governorate, Yemen. Bani Hassan and Hussein had a population of 3991 according to the 2004 census.
