= Lahab =

Lahab لهاب
- Sub-district
- Location in Yemen
- Coordinates: 14.946°N 43.697°E
- Country: Yemen
- Governorate: Sana'a
- District: Manakhah

Population (2004)
  - Total: 9,401
- Time zone: UTC+3

Lahab (Arabic: لهاب) is a sub-district located in Manakhah District, Sana'a Governorate, Yemen. Lahab had a population of 9401 according to the 2004 census.
