= Adhran =

Adhran عضران
- Sub-district
- Location in Yemen
- Coordinates: 15°30′05″N 44°22′01″E
- Country: Yemen
- Governorate: Sana'a
- District: Bani Hushaysh

Population (2004)
  - Total: 11,469
- Time zone: UTC+3

Adhran (Arabic: عضران) is a sub-district located in Bani Hushaysh District, Sana'a Governorate, Yemen. Adhran had a population of 11469 according to the 2004 census.
