= Zijan =

- Village
- Location in Yemen
- Coordinates: 15.54019°N 44.350°E
- Country: Yemen
- Governorate: Sanaa
- District: Bani Hushaysh
- Elevation: 7,260 ft (2,213 m)
- Time zone: UTC+3 (Yemen Standard Time)

Zijan (Arabic: زجان; Zijān) is a village in Bani Hushaysh District of Sanaa Governorate, Yemen. It is located just north of the historic fort of Dhu Marmar.

== History ==
The 10th-century writer al-Hamdani described Zijan as a source for waters that eventually reached al-Jawf. Zijan is also mentioned in the Kitab al-Simt of Muhammad ibn Hatim al-Yami al-Hamdani in connection with the nearby fortress of al-Fass, on Jabal al-Zalimah.
