= Al Hazm Airport =

Al Hazm Airport مطار الحزم
- IATA: none; ICAO: OYZM

Summary
- Airport type: Public
- Serves: Al Hazm
- Elevation AMSL: 3,690 ft / 1,125 m
- Coordinates: 16°12′30″N 44°47′30″E

Map
- Location of the airport in Yemen

Runways
Direction	Length		Surface
Direction	ft	m	Surface
02/20	7,550	2,300	Dirt
- Source: Google Maps

Al Hazm' (ICAO: OYZM)(Arabic: مطار الحزم) is an airstrip serving the town of Al Hazm in Yemen.

== See also ==
- Transport in Yemen
