= Time in Yemen =

Time in Yemen is given by Arabia Standard Time (AST) (UTC-06:30). Yemen does not currently observe daylight saving time.
