= Shu'aub district =

Coordinates: 15°30′N 44°22′E

Shu'aub District
- District
- Interactive map of Shu'aub District
- Country: Yemen
- Governorate: Amanat Al Asimah

Population (2003)
  - Total: 213,939
- Time zone: UTC+3 (Yemen Standard Time)

Shu'aub District is a district of the Amanat Al Asimah Governorate, Yemen. As of 2003, the district had a population of 213,939 inhabitants.
