= Al Hasan, Yemen =

Al Hasan ال حسن
- Sub-district
- Country: Yemen
- Governorate: Al Bayda
- District: As Sawadiyah

Population (2004)
  - Total: 4,988
- Time zone: UTC+3

Al Hasan (Arabic: ال حسن) is a sub-district located in As Sawadiyah District, Al Bayda Governorate, Yemen. Al Hasan had a population of 4988 according to the 2004 census.
