= Al Hazm, Makkah =

Al Hazm
- Town
- Location in Saudi Arabia
- Coordinates: 21°13′32″N 41°38′33″E
- Country: Saudi Arabia
- Province: Makkah Province
- Time zone: UTC+3 (EAT)
  - Summer (DST): UTC+3 (EAT)

Al Hazm is a town in Makkah Province, in western Saudi Arabia. It lies near Turabah.

== See also ==
- List of cities and towns in Saudi Arabia
- Regions of Saudi Arabia
