= Shada'a district =

Coordinates: 17°00′N 43°20′E

Shada'a District مديرية شداء
- District
- Interactive map of Shada'a District
- Country: Yemen
- Governorate: Sa'dah

Population (2003)
  - Total: 11,202
- Time zone: UTC+3 (Yemen Standard Time)

Shada'a District (Arabic: مديرية شداء mudiriat shada') is a district of the Sa'dah Governorate, Yemen. As of 2003, the district had a population of 11,202 inhabitants.
