= As Safra district =

Coordinates: 17°10′N 44°00′E

As Safra District مديرية الصفراء
- District
- Interactive map of As Safra District
- Country: Yemen
- Governorate: Sa'dah Governorate

Population (2003)
  - Total: 50,845
- Time zone: UTC+3 (Yemen Standard Time)

As Safra District (Arabic: مديرية الصفراء) is a district of the Sa'dah Governorate, Yemen. As of 2003, the district had a population of 50,845 people.
