= Raghwan district =

Coordinates: 15°45′N 45°15′E

Raghwan District
- District
- Interactive map of Raghwan District
- Country: Yemen
- Governorate: Ma'rib

Population (2003)
  - Total: 4,391
- Time zone: UTC+3 (Yemen Standard Time)

Raghwan District is a district of the Ma'rib Governorate, Yemen. As of 2003, the district had a population of 4,391 inhabitants.
