= Sahar district =

Coordinates: 16°50′N 43°40′E

Sahar District مديرية سحار
- District
- Interactive map of Sahar District
- Country: Yemen
- Governorate: Sa'dah Governorate

Population (2003)
  - Total: 133,060
- Time zone: UTC+3 (Yemen Standard Time)

Sahar District (Arabic: مديرية سحار) is a district of the Sa'dah Governorate, Yemen. As of 2003, the district had a population of 133,060 people.

The Sahar District has been called the food basket of Yemen.

The area around Sahar has been one of the most affected areas of the conflict in the Yemeni Civil War.

== Economy ==
Sahar District has many local markets and bazaars, most notably the Al Talh market, which is the largest market in the governorate.

The district has good farmland, and produces more fruit and vegetables than qat. The United Nations Development Programme has described the district as "the food basket of Yemen".

Approximately 70% of workers in Sahar District earn their income from agriculture, either from their own farms or as labourers on other people's farms. This includes youths who are hired to pack, store, and load produce. Hundreds of them are employed by the Alsunbolah Cooperative Agricultural Association, which exports 90% of the district's agricultural produce. Another 20% of workers are employed in private-sector businesses, frequently operating their own businesses. These include gas stations, grocery stores, auto sales and services, and shops selling farm equipment. Some women, although limited in number, also make money by selling clothes or household goods, or by working as tailors. Finally, around 10% of workers are employed in the public sector, mostly in education, healthcare, and military roles. Some public-sector workers also operate small businesses on the side.

== Housing ==
Houses in Sahar are traditionally made of mud, and are home to more than one family. Some families live in newer homes made of stone or cement block; these families use their old mud houses to house livestock or to store fodder and wood.

== Impact of civil war ==
Sahar has been severely impacted by the Yemeni Civil War, and is one of the most affected places in the governorate. Attacks on main roads, markets, gas stations, schools, healthcare facilities, and even residential neighbourhoods have killed many and left many more with severe injuries. Residents have "expressed feelings of extreme physical insecurity, fearing that they may be killed at any time." One woman interviewed said, "We are not safe and we do not know if we will still be alive when the war is over." Sahar residents face acute malnutrition due to lack of access to food, while infectious disease has increased, especially among women and children. Infrastructure has also been heavily damaged by the war, including health, education, water, and electricity. Undetonated explosives are scattered throughout the district, forcing residents to abandon areas previously used as farms or pastures. Prices have increased substantially, and there has been growth of a black market, especially for fuel and cooking gas. There has also been an increase in crime, with many desperate men (especially young men) stealing or joining armed gangs in order to feed their families. There has also been an increase in gender-based violence.

== Population ==
- 1994 = 27,621
- 2005 = 60,487
