= Ma'ain district =

Coordinates: 15°30′N 44°15′E

Ma'een District مديرية معين
- District
- Interactive map of Ma'een District
- Country: Yemen
- Governorate: Amanat Al Asimah

Population (2003)
  - Total: 265,269
- Time zone: UTC+3 (Yemen Standard Time)

Ma'een District is a district of the Amanat Al Asimah Governorate, Yemen. As of 2003, the district had a population of 265,269 inhabitants.
