= Majz district =

Coordinates: 17°05′N 43°30′E

Majz District
- District
- Interactive map of Majz District
- Country: Yemen
- Governorate: Sa'dah

Population (2003)
  - Total: 68,598
- Time zone: UTC+3 (Yemen Standard Time)

Majz District is a district of the Sa'dah Governorate, Yemen. As of 2003, the district had a population of 68,598 inhabitants.
