= El Mansouria district =

Coordinates: 14°30′N 43°20′E

Al Mansuriyah District
- District
- Interactive map of Al Mansuriyah District
- Country: Yemen
- Governorate: Al Hudaydah

Population (2003)
  - Total: 44,744
- Time zone: UTC+3 (Yemen Standard Time)

Al Mansuriyah District is a district of the Al Hudaydah Governorate, Yemen. As of 2003, the district had a population of 44,744 inhabitants.
