= As Sabain district =

Coordinates: 15°25′N 44°18′E

As Sabʿain District السبعين
- District
- Interactive map of As Sabʿain District
- Country: Yemen
- Governorate: Amanat Al Asimah

Population (2003)
  - Total: 311,203
- Time zone: UTC+3 (Yemen Standard Time)

As Sabʿain District (Arabic: مديرية السبعين) is a district of the Amanat Al Asimah Governorate, Yemen. In 2003, the district had a population of 311,203 inhabitants.
