= Majzar district =

Coordinates: 15°45′N 45°00′E

Majzar District
- District
- Interactive map of Majzar District
- Country: Yemen
- Governorate: Ma'rib

Population (2003)
  - Total: 10,477
- Time zone: UTC+3 (Yemen Standard Time)

Majzar District is a district of the Ma'rib Governorate, Yemen. As of 2003, the district had a population of 10,477 inhabitants.
