= Khabb wa ash Sha'af district =

Coordinates: 16°45′N 45°25′E

Khabb wa ash Sha'af District
- District
- Interactive map of Khabb wa ash Sha'af District
- Country: Yemen
- Governorate: Al Jawf Governorate

Area
  - Total: 32,510.40 km^{2} (12,552.34 sq mi)

Population (2003)
  - Total: 280,193
  - Density: 0.246/km^{2} (0.64/sq mi)
- Time zone: UTC+3 (Yemen Standard Time)

Khabb wa ash Sha'af District is a district of the Al Jawf Governorate, Yemen. As of 2003, the district had a population of 80,193 people. It is the biggest district in Al-Jawf Governorate by population and area but is the least densely populated. It makes up 82% of the total area of Al-Jawf Governorate.
