= Bart Al Anan district =

Coordinates: 16°45′N 44°25′E

Bart Al Anan District
- District
- Interactive map of Bart Al Anan District
- Country: Yemen
- Governorate: Al Jawf

Population (2003)
  - Total: 79,512
- Time zone: UTC+3 (Yemen Standard Time)

Bart Al Anan District is a district of the Al Jawf Governorate, Yemen. As of 2003, the district had a population of 59,463 inhabitants.
