= Al Hazm, Yemen =

Al Hazm الحزم
- Town
- Location in Yemen
- Coordinates: 16°9′51″N 44°46′36″E
- Country: Yemen
- Governorate: Al-Jawf Governorate
- District: Al Hazm District

Population (2004)
  - Total: 16,044
- Time zone: UTC+3 (Yemen Standard Time)

Al Hazm or al-Hazm (Arabic: الحزم) is the principal town of Al-Jawf Governorate and Al Hazm district in Yemen. It is located northwest of the city of Marib and southeast of Saada. It is served by Al Hazm Airport. Its population was 16,044, according to the 2004 national census.

In the late 1980s a highway was built through Al Hazm, leading to Baraqish and Ma'in to the south to Marib. Yemen was reported by OPEC to have received a $5m loan for the road project on May 11, 1987.

On March 1, 2020, the city was captured by the Houthis during the al-Jawf offensive.

In August 2022, heavy rains caused flooding that destroyed six homes and damaged 20.

== Climate ==
The climate in Al Hazm is hot and dry. Most rain falls in the winter. The Köppen-Geiger climate classification is Bwh. The average annual temperature in Al Hazm is 22.8 °C (73.0 °F). About 92 mm (3.62 in) of precipitation falls annually.

Climate data for Al Hazm
Month	Jan	Feb	Mar	Apr	May	Jun	Jul	Aug	Sep	Oct	Nov	Dec	Year
Mean daily maximum °C (°F)	25.9 (78.6)	27.1 (80.8)	28.9 (84.0)	30.6 (87.1)	32.6 (90.7)	34.2 (93.6)	33.8 (92.8)	33.1 (91.6)	31.9 (89.4)	29.0 (84.2)	25.8 (78.4)	26.6 (79.9)	30.0 (85.9)
Mean daily minimum °C (°F)	10.6 (51.1)	11.3 (52.3)	14.8 (58.6)	16.6 (61.9)	19.2 (66.6)	19.5 (67.1)	21.0 (69.8)	20.4 (68.7)	18.9 (66.0)	14.5 (58.1)	11.3 (52.3)	10.9 (51.6)	15.8 (60.3)
Average precipitation mm (inches)	4 (0.2)	1 (0.0)	10 (0.4)	15 (0.6)	16 (0.6)	1 (0.0)	13 (0.5)	21 (0.8)	4 (0.2)	0 (0)	2 (0.1)	5 (0.2)	92 (3.6)
Source: Climate-Data.org, Climate data
