= Kitaf wa Al Boqe'e district =

Coordinates: 17°10′N 44°20′E

Kitaf wa Al Boqe'e District مديرية كتاف والبقع
- District
- Interactive map of Kitaf wa Al Boqe'e District
- Country: Yemen
- Governorate: Sa'dah

Population (2003)
  - Total: 43,034
- Time zone: UTC+3 (Yemen Standard Time)

Kitaf wa Al Boqe'e District (Arabic: مديرية كتاف والبقع) is a district of the Sa'dah Governorate, Yemen. As of 2003, the district had a population of 43,034 inhabitants.

== Populated settlements ==
Name	Population	Year (as of)	Notes
Al ‘Aţfah	39	2017	
Albuq	69	2017	
Al Ḩajar	37	2016	
Al Ḩayd	35	2012	
Maqām Bin Zāhir	34	2012	
Qaryat Bin Jarān	41	2012	
Waţan al Maqāsh	46	2012	
