= Al Hazm district =

Al Hazm district مديرية الحزم
- District
- Location in Yemen
- Coordinates: 16°15′N 44°55′E
- Country: Yemen
- Governorate: Al Jawf
- Seat: Al Hazm

Population (2003)
  - Total: 44,456
- Time zone: UTC+3 (Yemen Standard Time)

Al Hazm district (Arabic: مديرية الحزم) is a district of the Al Jawf Governorate, Yemen. As of 2003, the district had a population of 30,952 inhabitants. The capital lies at Al Hazm.
