= Khawlan district =

Coordinates: 15.2747°N 44.7683°E

Khawlan District
- District
- Interactive map of Khawlan District
- Country: Yemen
- Governorate: Sanaa

Population (2003)
  - Total: 28,925
- Time zone: UTC+3 (Yemen Standard Time)

Khawlan District (Arabic: مديرية خولان) is a district of the Sanaa Governorate, Yemen. As of 2003, the district had a population of 28,925 inhabitants.
