= Bani Hushaysh district =

Coordinates: 15°30′N 44°30′E

Bani Hushaysh District مديرية بني حشيش
- District
- Interactive map of Bani Hushaysh District
- Country: Yemen
- Governorate: Sana'a

Population (2003)
  - Total: 73,957
- Time zone: UTC+3 (Yemen Standard Time)

Bani Hushaysh District (Arabic: مديرية بني حشيش) is a district in Sana'a Governorate, Yemen. As of 2003, the district had a population of 73,957 inhabitants. It is home to grape plantations.
