= Sanhan and Bani Bahlul district =

Coordinates: 15°15′N 44°10′E

Sanhan and Bani Bahlul District (Arabic: مديرية سنحان وبني بهلول, romanized: Sanḥān and Bani Bahlul) is a district of the Sana'a Governorate, Yemen. Its seat is Sanhan. Sanhan is a constituent tribe of the Hashid confederation, itself part of the larger Hamdan confederation in Yemen.

As of 2003, the district had a population of 400,399 inhabitants. The former president of Yemen Ali Abdullah Saleh comes from Beit al-Ahmar, which lies in Sanhan District.
