= Manakhah district =

Coordinates: 15°04′19″N 43°44′27″E

Manakhah District مديرية مناخة
- District
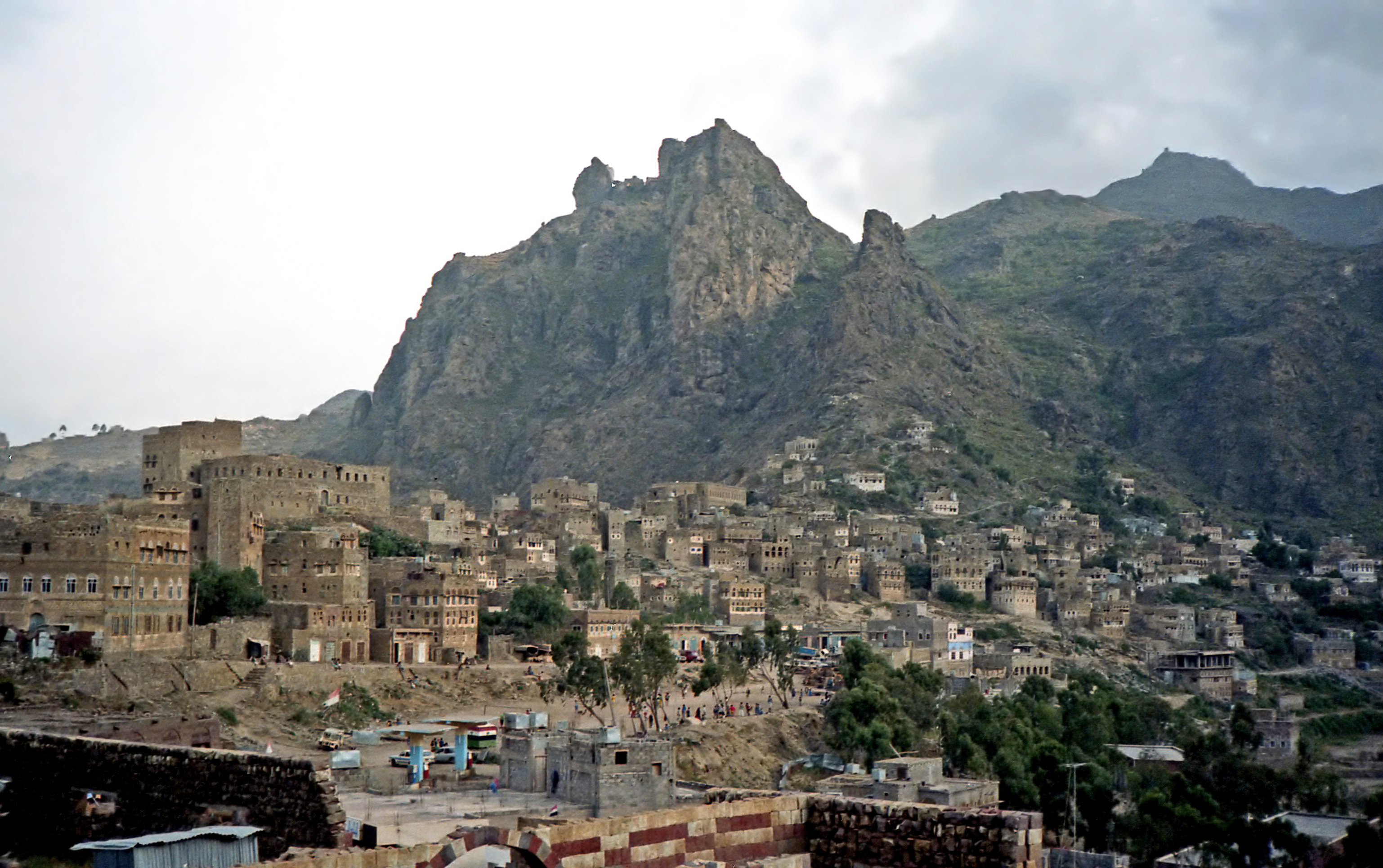
- Village of Manakhah
- Interactive map of Manakhah District مديرية مناخة
- Country: Yemen
- Governorate: Sana'a

Population (2003)
  - Total: 78,932
- Time zone: UTC+3 (Yemen Standard Time)

Manakhah District (Arabic: مديرية مناخة) is a district of the Sana'a Governorate, Yemen. As of 2003, the district had a population of 78,932 inhabitants.
