= Dubrava Prison massacre =

1999 prison bombing in Dubrava Prison, Kosovo

- Date: 19–23 May 1999
- Location: Dubrava Prison, near Istog, Kosovo, Yugoslavia
- Deaths: 19–23 (bombings); 79–82 (summary execution)
- Property damage: Prison bombed

The Dubrava Prison massacre was the war time killing of at least 99 Kosovar Albanian prisoners and the wounding of around 200 more in the Dubrava Prison, in North-Western Kosovo between 22 and 24 May 1999.

Initially, NATO claimed that the prison was a military barracks. Targeting Yugoslav and Serb forces nearby, NATO bombed the prison on 19 May and 21 May 1999. On 22 May, Serbian security forces lined up the approximately 1,000 prisoners in the courtyard and fired on them with snipers, machine guns, and grenades from the prison walls and guard towers, killing at least seventy people. At least twelve more prisoners were killed over the next twenty-four hours as prison guards, special police, and possibly paramilitary forces attacked prisoners who were hiding in the prison's destroyed buildings, basements, and sewers. The injured were taken away in trucks, while the remaining prisoners were transported to Lipjan prison, where they were beaten. On 10 June, they were transferred to prisons in Serbia after the war had ended.

The consistency of the testimonies among witnesses, including specific details about times and locations, leaves no doubt that Serbian and possibly Yugoslav government forces deliberately and without justification killed a substantial number of ethnic Albanians in the prison.

== Background ==
Dubrava prison was Kosovo's largest detention facility. Located a few miles east of Istog in north-western Kosovo (Dukagjini region), near the border with Montenegro, the prison had three pavilions with a capacity of more than 1,000. The inmates were suspected KLA guerrillas and common criminals. As with all of Kosovo's detention facilities, credible reports of torture and abuse emanated from Dubrava prison throughout 1998 and early 1999.

Defense lawyers reported restricted access to their clients in Dubrava, and the Kosovo Verification Mission was never allowed access to the prison. There were many complaints of torture and beatings from people held in the prison, with injuries ranging from broken bones to permanent kidney failure. It is believed that at least four or five men died as a result of beatings sustained while they were detained at the prison between October 1998 and March 1999. One witness told Human Rights Watch that prison guards beat the prisoners every day once the NATO bombing began.

One former prisoner transferred to Dubrava on 30 April said that approximately 165 ethnic Albanians from Gjakova were brought in a short time after he had arrived. This was confirmed during the April–May 2000 trial in Niš of 143 Albanians arrested in Gjakova in May 1999, who testified that they had been transferred from Gjakova to prisons in Peja, Lipjan, and Dubrava.

Among the ethnic Albanians in Dubrava was one of Kosovo's most prominent political prisoners, Ukshin Hoti, who was finishing the last year of a five-year sentence. Three witnesses said that Hoti was released from Dubrava on 16 May because his sentence expired. His current whereabouts, however, are unknown, and many former prisoners and human rights activists believe that he is dead.

Witnesses before the International Criminal Tribunal for the former Yugoslavia (ICTY) have testified that Yugoslav army tanks and anti-aircraft guns had been placed around the jail, which in April were hit by NATO aircraft. Some former prisoners claim that they saw anti-aircraft fire coming from near the prison during the nearby NATO bombing.

== NATO bombings ==
NATO bombed what it claimed to be Yugoslav Army and Serbian police forces near the prison at 1:15 p.m. on 19 May, killing four and wounding two civilians. The prisoners spent the next two nights sleeping outside, but within the walls of the prison. On 21 May, prison guards ordered the prisoners to line up in the courtyard. However, the process was interrupted when NATO planes flew over.

The next day, Tanjug (the state news agency for FR Yugoslavia) reported that nineteen prisoners and guards had been killed and more than ten were wounded. The victims of the bombings, at least 23, were KLA members. The Yugoslav government claimed 85 civilian deaths, while Human Rights Watch determined ca. 18 deaths. Another source stated that 95 were killed and 196 injured.

== Executions ==
Inmates were extrajudicially killed or summary executed on 22 and 23 May.

Witnesses before ICTY stated that early in the morning of 22 May 1999, the prisoners were told to line up on the sports field, with the explanation that they were to be transferred to other more secure prisons. About 800 prisoners obeyed while the rest hid themselves in the jail. After the prisoners formed a line, police started firing from the guard tower and the jail walls, using hand grenades, rocket-propelled grenades, and automatic weapons. The witnesses stated that about 20 officers opened fire, and that this was followed by a large number of Albanian prisoners collapsing to the ground and widespread disorder. Witness testimony, complete with details of times and locations, indicates that government forces were directly responsible for a substantial number of executions in the prison.

Other witnesses testified that on the same day, prison officials ordered the approximately 1,000 prisoners to line up in the prison yard. After a few minutes, they were fired upon from the prison walls and guard towers with machine guns and grenades, killing at least seventy people. Another estimate was 67 casualties. Over the next twenty-four hours, prison guards, special police, and possibly paramilitary forces attacked prisoners who were hiding in the prison's buildings, basements, and sewers, killing at least another twelve inmates.

In 2011 the Republic of Kosovo Member of Parliament and witness to the massacre Nait Hasani stated:

... we were called to this place, surrounded by a crowd of guards - and then the hunting started ... they fired from three sides with grenades and machine guns ... you saw nothing than flames, fire and blood ....

Another witness told Human Rights Watch:

They put us in a line. Around 6:10 a.m., they said we have ten minutes to get in a line. The line was not clean, but had four to six people in a line, about 200 meters long. After a few seconds, we were twenty to twenty-five meters from the walls, they threw some three or four hand grenades. At the same time, they began shooting with RPGs [rocket propelled grenades], and snipers [sniper rifles]. Whoever could manage just fell to the ground.

Another recalled:

We were made to stand in a line on a cement football field surrounded by guard towers. About 100 people were in one line. We stood there about ten minutes until we were all in a line. Then a guy named "Ace" climbed up one of the towers and gave the order to shoot. We saw that. It was something like twenty minutes of constant shooting from the five meter-high walls—it was all prepared. They had hand-held RPGs, sniper rifles, machine guns, AK47s, hand grenades, and mortars. They were shooting from the walls. The bombs fell on everyone and people were flying.

Chaos ensued as prisoners ran for cover in the various buildings of the prison, their basements, or the prison's sewer system. That evening, all of the witnesses say, a group of special police or paramilitary forces entered the prison and tried to reassert control. The assault lasted approximately twenty minutes, during which time hand grenades were thrown into the school building, allegedly killing at least two people. The prisoners remained hidden during the night, some of them preparing to defend themselves with makeshift weapons made from broken furniture or garden tools. The wounded, numbering about 120 to 150, were placed in the basement of Pavilion C. The following morning, the witnesses said, new soldiers or paramilitary units came to the jail, opened the drains and threw hand grenades in. That day, four people committed suicide in their cells.

A witness told Human Rights Watch:

Then the forces saw us and surrounded us. I saw them come with machine guns and big knives and they hit the twenty-eight guys in the basement. People's organs were spilling out everywhere.

Later in the morning, the security forces had reasserted some control over the prison, and they issued an ultimatum for the prisoners to emerge from their hiding places within fifteen minutes. With no other options, the prisoners revealed themselves. They were then gathered in the prison's sports hall, which was still undamaged. According to the witnesses, Yugoslav Army soldiers were present this time.

The injured were taken away in trucks, while the remaining prisoners were transported in approximately ten buses to Lipljan prison in south-central Kosovo. All of the former prisoners claimed to have been beaten in Lipjan. All of the ethnic Albanian prisoners in Lipljan were transferred to prisons in Central Serbia. The Yugoslav government claimed NATO bombs had killed 95 inmates and injured 196. As the prisoners got on buses, the police counted those missing. It came to 154, witnesses stated.

Jacky Rowland, a BBC journalist who was escorted by the Yugoslav government to the prison, testified before the ICTY seeing a prison room in with about 25 bodies piled up in one place. In addition to the fact that there was no visible damage from bombing in that room, Rowland was "especially disturbed" by the fact that the corpses had their trousers pulled down to the ankles, so that their underwear was visible, ruling out death due to blast effect.

== Aftermath ==
Since all of the survivors of the massacre were transferred to prisons in Central Serbia after the attack, accounts of the killings did not emerge until after the war when some of the prisoners were released. In June 1999, Spanish NATO troops discovered one body in the prison, who had been lying there at least one month, his throat was cut.

On 13 August, a Spanish forensic team began exhuming 97 graves that were found near Dubrava prison. A legal advisor to the ICTY, Karl Koenig, stated that the bodies appeared to have been there since 26 or 27 May. In her 10 November 1999 report to the U.N. Security Council, ICTY chief prosecutor Carla Del Ponte said that 97 bodies had been found at the Rakosh site.

A New York Times reporter who visited the prison in November 1999 witnessed: "basements of the buildings, the blood lies still sticky on the floor, bullet holes scar the walls, and impact marks of grenade explosions crater the floors."

== Perpetrators ==
The Serbian police in Istok were under the jurisdiction of the Secretariat of Internal Affairs (SUP) in Peja, which covered the municipalities of Peja, Klina, and Istog. The commander of the Peja SUP during the war was Col. Boro Vlahović.

Journalist Paul Watson, who visited Dubrava on 19 May and 21 May quoted one official from the prison, Aleksandar Rakočević, whom he identified as a warden.

Two former prisoners who spoke with Human Rights Watch (HRW) said that the director of the prison was known as "Miki", a dark-skinned man who spoke perfect Albanian. According to a witness, the deputy director was known as "Ace" and he was the one who allegedly gave the order to fire on the assembled prisoners on 22 May.

Albanian prisoners that spoke to HRW claimed that the prison guards had released and armed some of the ethnic Serbian prisoners after the first NATO raid on 19 May. Both witnesses said they saw some of these people back in the prison attacking the Albanians with whom they had, until recently, been incarcerated.

Another former Dubrava prisoner, Kosovo MP Ukë Thaçi, is convinced that the Dubrava killings were an "organized massacre through prison staff, police and army ... it was a Serbian state planning ..., because Serbian police and army were located within the prison facilities."

The fact that the Peja SUP, which after the war had been moved to Serbia, compiled a report on the killing of prisoners in the Dubrava prison three years after the event, was interpreted by the ICTY prosecutor as having the purpose to help the defense of Slobodan Milošević.

== See also ==
- 2022 Saada prison airstrike
- 2025 Saada prison airstrike

== Sources ==
- HRW (2001). Under Orders: War Crimes in Kosovo. Human Rights Watch. pp. 244–259. ISBN 978-1-56432-264-7.
