= Masam Project =

Landmine clearance project in Yemen

Project Masam
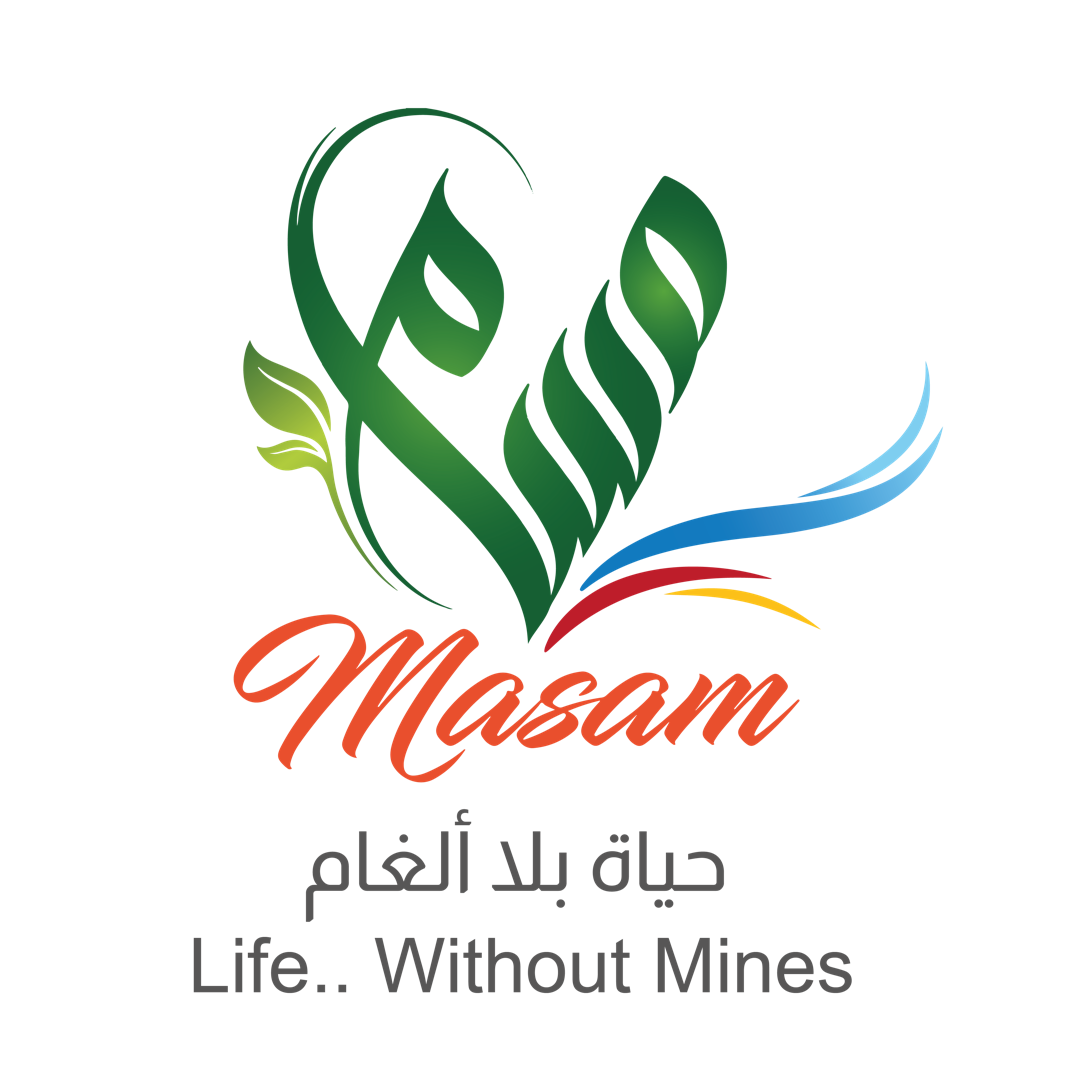
- Formation: 2018
- Legal status: Not-for-profit
- Locations: Aden, Yemen; Marib, Yemen
- Services: Humanitarian Landmine Clearance, Mine Risk Education, Victim Assistance
- Managing Director: Ousama Algosaibi
- Website: https://www.projectmasam.com/eng/

Project Masam is a multilateral humanitarian land mine clearance project in Yemen launched by the Kingdom of Saudi Arabia in June 2018.

It works in coordination and partnership with Yemen Executive Mine Action Center to clear Yemeni territory of Anti-tank (AT) and Anti-personnel mines (AP) along with improvised explosive devices (IEDs) and unexploded ordnance (UXO) with the aim of alleviating the humanitarian catastrophe caused by mines in Yemen.

== Project objectives ==
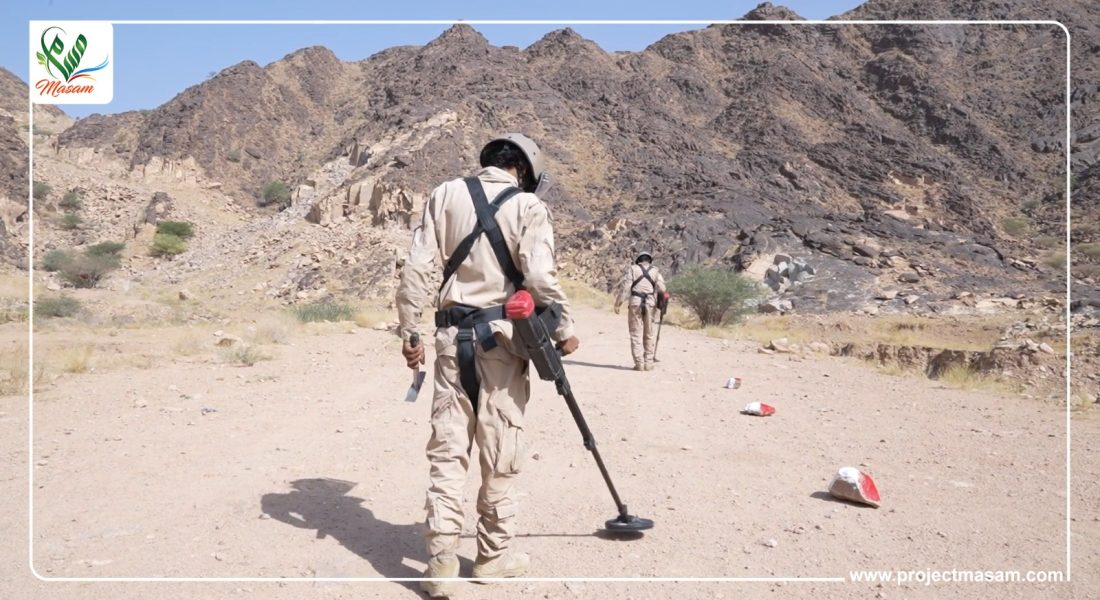
Project Masam deminers walk up to the minefield during landmine clearance in Yemen.

Project Masam provides guidance, ongoing operational support and carries out comprehensive emergency clearance operations in line with the international demining standards during Yemen's on-going and active conflict.

Project Masam's goals include:

- Training, equipping and supervising Yemeni local teams to swiftly respond to emergency situations and support these teams in their humanitarian clearance operations
- Establishing a mechanism for humanitarian mine action management skills transfer to key personnel
- Rapidly locating and clearing landmines, IEDs and UXO from liberated areas across Yemen
- Clearing areas of immediate humanitarian priority (villages, roads and paths, water sources, health care and medical families, schools, etc...) in order to facilitate the safe movement of civilians, humanitarian goods, trade and services
- Safely carrying out single- and multi-item demolitions of landmines and other remnants of war (ERW) in situ, and bulk demolitions
- Working closely with and supporting the UN Mission to support the Hudaydah Agreement (UNMHA) and United Nations Security Council Panel of Eminent Experts on Yemen by providing timely technical information about the landmine and IED situation in Yemen as well as evidence of potential violations of human rights and related incidents in Yemen
- Assisting the Yemeni people to effectively address the human tragedy caused by landmines, UXO and IEDs, raising awareness, creating resilience within communities and empowering them to take long-term responsibility by providing Mine Risk Education (MRE) and victim assistance
- Engaging local, regional and international stakeholders and the general public as part of its campaign demanding the release of maps, coordinates and other relevant information pertaining to the location of minefields.

== Project phases ==
- Training and equipping local teams and with providing them with the expert technical and logistical support to safely deal with dangerous threats and explosive items
- Rapid response to emergency situations and/or accident reports
- Securing suspected hazardous areas (SHA) and confirmed hazardous areas (CHA)
- Carrying out emergency Mine Risk Education (MRE) with local authorities and local populations
- Survey and clearance of the area
- Carrying out comprehensive clearance operations of explosive threats in line with the international demining standards

== Project personnel ==
Project Masam employs 580 staff in and outside of Yemen. It has 32 Yemeni national teams working across a wide geographic range in Yemen with each team consisting of 10 members.

The team layout is as follows:

- One Team Leader
- One Deputy Team Leader
- Six Deminers
- One Medic
- One Ambulance driver

Staff also includes administration, communications, logistics and security support staff, who are supported by 30 experienced technical mentors, and rapid response teams.

Project Masam also deploys eight explosive detection dogs in Marib.

A dedicated team of Explosive Ordnance Disposal Specialist and Senior Medics train, equip and supervise local clearance teams, manual mine clearance (MMC) team medics and translators/interpreters.

Because of the improvised nature of some of ever-evolving threats and the growing use of homemade IEDs, Project Masam also employs Improvised Explosive Device Threat Mitigation Specialists to investigate the threats, report on these unconventionally manufactured devices and train demining personnel to deal with technical and technological aspects of new locally-build devices.

30 demining personnel, including five foreign Explosive Ordnance Disposal Specialist, have been killed and 47 others have been injured while carrying out their demining operations since 2018.

== Project work areas ==
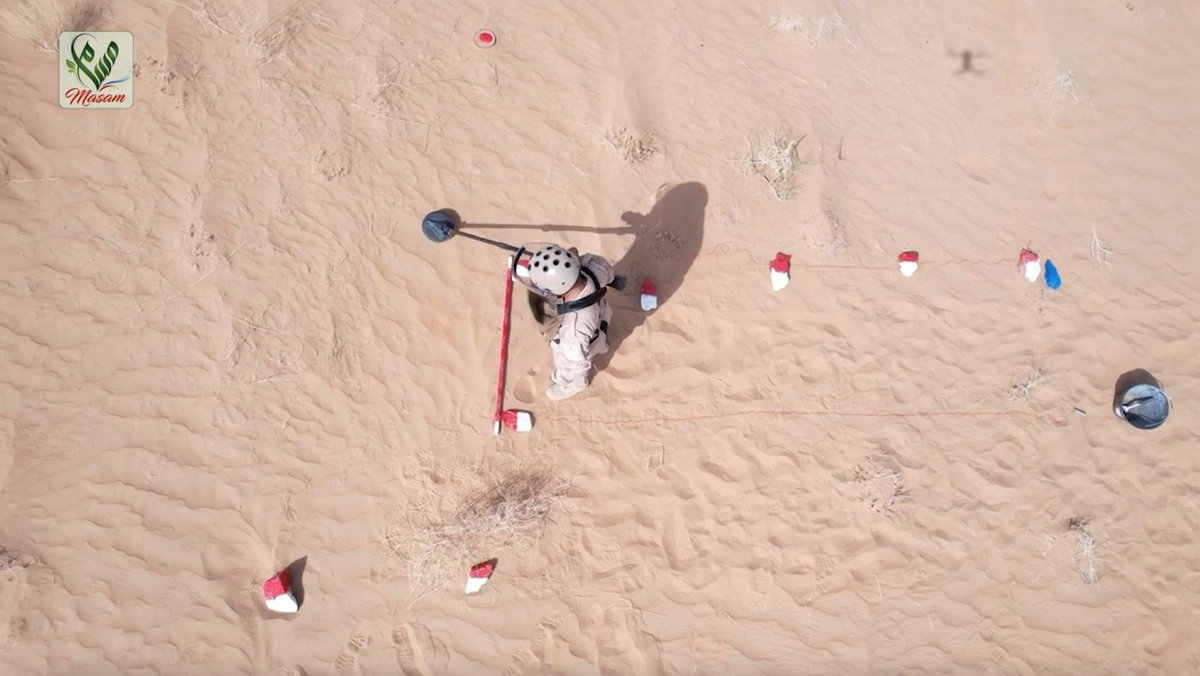
Drone footage of a Project Masam deminer clearing his lane in a minefield in Yemen.

The number of landmines, indiscriminately planted in Yemeni territory, is evaluated at two million, according to several estimations.

Since launch in mid-2018, Project Masam has worked in twelve regions:

- Sana'a
- Hodeidah
- Aden
- Al-Bayda
- Al Jawf
- Lahej
- Marib
- Shabwa
- Taiz
- Al Dhale'
- Saada
- Hajjah

The project announced it was expanding its operations into Midi district in Yemen’s Hajjah province in September 2025 following a month-long field survey, establishing new clearance teams.

== Statistics and results ==
Since launching the project at the end of June 2018 until June 2024:

- Project Masam has cleared 518,633 landmines, UXO and IEDs
- The total cleared area (M2) 71,451,008
- Total AP mines: 6,530
- Total AT mines: 144,439
- Total UXO: 355,930
- Total IEDs: 8,283

== Project annual reports ==
=== 2018 ===
- Total cleared area (M2): 1,332,830
- Total AP mines: 707
- Total AT mines: 19,242
- Total UXO: 11,345
- Total IED: 914

=== 2019 ===
- Total cleared area (M2): 5,505,327
- Total AP mines: 1,013
- Total AT mines: 26,432
- Total UXO: 57,301
- Total IED: 3,191

=== 2020 ===
- Total cleared area (M2): 11,279,363
- Total AP mines: 858
- Total AT mines: 14,735
- Total UXO: 71,066
- Total IED: 1,710

=== 2021 ===
- Total cleared area (M2): 10,814,936
- Total AP mines: 1,704
- Total AT mines: 42,077
- Total UXO: 48,143
- Total IED: 423

=== 2022 ===
- Total cleared area (M2): 137,111,65
- Total AP mines: 1,697
- Total AT mines: 33,048
- Total UXO: 42,576
- Total IED: 1,432

=== 2023 ===
- Total cleared area (M2): 10,222,723
- Total AP mines: 465
- Total AT mines: 7,032
- Total UXO: 39,434
- Total IED: 273

=== 2024 ===
- Total land area cleared: 10,511,927 m²
- Total anti-personnel (AP) mines cleared: 246
- Total anti-tank (AT) mines cleared: 3,258
- Total unexploded ordnance (UXO) cleared: 45,882
- Total IEDs removed: 237.

== Honours ==
- Medal of Bravery - Republic of Yemen.

== Ottawa Treaty 1997 ==
Signed in Norway on 18 September 1997, the Convention on the Prohibition of the Use, Stockpiling, Production and Transfer of Anti-Personnel Mines and on their Destruction of 1997, known informally as the Ottawa Treaty, the Anti-Personnel Mine Ban Convention, or often simply the Mine Ban Treaty, aims at eliminating anti-personnel landmines (AP-mines) around the world.

It was launched to end the suffering and casualties caused by AP mines that kill or maim, every week, hundreds of people, most of them are innocent and unarmed civilians, especially children, and impede economic development and reconstruction, prevent refugees and internally displaced persons from returning to their homeland along with causing other extremely grave consequences after years of planting them.

Yemen recognised the inhumanity of AP mines, becoming in 1998, one of the first countries in the Middle-East/North Africa region to join the convention.

In April 2017, Human Rights Watch called on Houthi militias to stop using landmines and to respect the Ottawa Treaty banning the use of AP mines.

In April 2023, Project Masam Managing Director Ousama Algosaibi told La Croix newspaper the Houthis continue to plant banned mines despite the Mine Ban Treaty: "Les mines des houthistes ont entravé toute forme d'aide humanitaire au Yémen. Elles ont affecté des villages entiers, des terres agricoles, des écoles, des puits d'eau."

In October 2023, Algosaibi told Yemen Today TV news channel: "Yemen has had a landmine problem for a long time and Yemen is a signatory on the Mine Ban Treaty agreement."

"The anti-tank and anti-personnel mines that we are finding in Yemen are all Al Houthi manufactured – they are no longer the old mines that were existing in Yemen prior to this war."

== Civilian impact of landmines ==
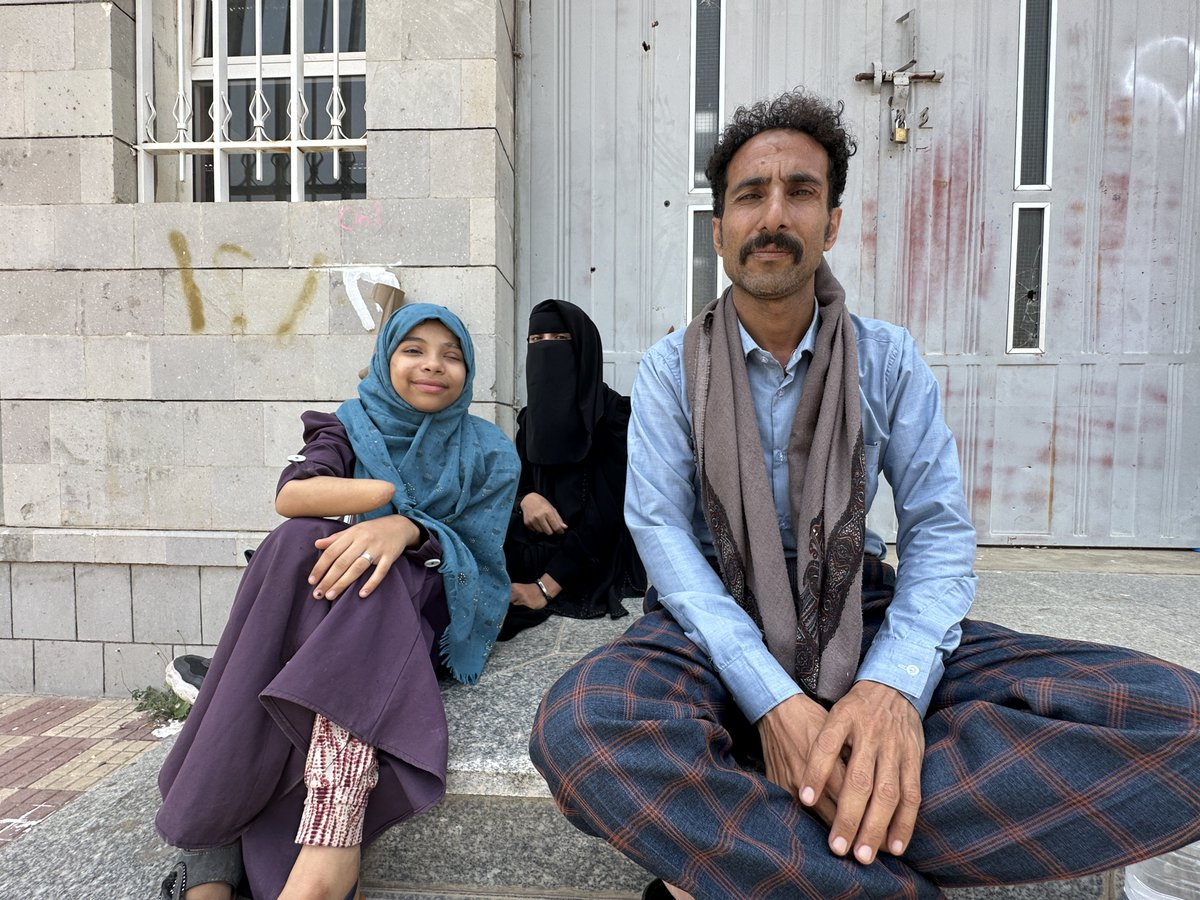
A father and his two daughters who were injured by landmine explosions in Taiz, Yemen.

The American Center for Justice (a non-profit organisation) launched its report entitled "Mines: The Blind Killer", which monitors and documents cases of killing, injury and destruction of property, as a result of the mines.

The report indicated that from June 2014 to February 2022, an estimated 2,526 civilians, including 429 children and 217 women, were killed, and 3,286 others were injured, including 723 children and 220 women, in seventeen Yemeni governorates. About 75% of those have been permanently maimed or disfigured. The report documents the destruction of about 425 different private means of transportation completely and 163 partially due to landmines.

According to a study by the non-governmental organisation Save the Children, approximately every two days, a child lost their life or was wounded in Yemen due to landmines and unexploded ordnance in 2022. The report found these figures represented the highest level in the past five years.

In September 2023, the International Committee of the Red Cross reported that "Yemen has one of the world's highest rates of contamination with landmines and other deadly explosives".

Yemen's Mayyun Organisation for Human Rights and Development, in partnership with Project Masam, in October 2023 held an event titled "We act together to protect children from risk of conflicts", aimed at highlighting patterns of violations against children, including victims of landmines, explosive items and child recruitment. Mayyun and Project Masam reported that more than 6,700 children have been killed or injured by landmines in Yemen since the beginning of the current conflict.

== Military clearance and humanitarian clearance ==
In areas of armed conflict, land and naval mines are generally cleared by military personnel, for tactical reasons.

"Military clearance is generally done to support a military activity: there might be an enemy minefield which troops need to get through so they will breach a way through it by clearing a patch suitable for their means," according to Project Masam Director of Special Operations Chris Clark.

Humanitarian clearance operations begin following the movement from armed forced from an area. These operations aim mainly at surveying and completely securing these areas so as to protect civilian lives and livestock, securing vital facilities and infrastructure and allowing the returned of displaced populations.

"When you move into humanitarian clearance as we're conducting in Yemen, the end result has to be the total removal of the minefield in all sense and the assurance that we haven't missed anything. Therefore, we conduct our processes in accordance to IMAS, which were developed to focus on this aspect," according to Clark.

"Part of the requirements to conform to IMAS is that every mine that we find needs to be accounted for and destroyed so they can't be used as a weapon again."

== Humanitarian impact ==
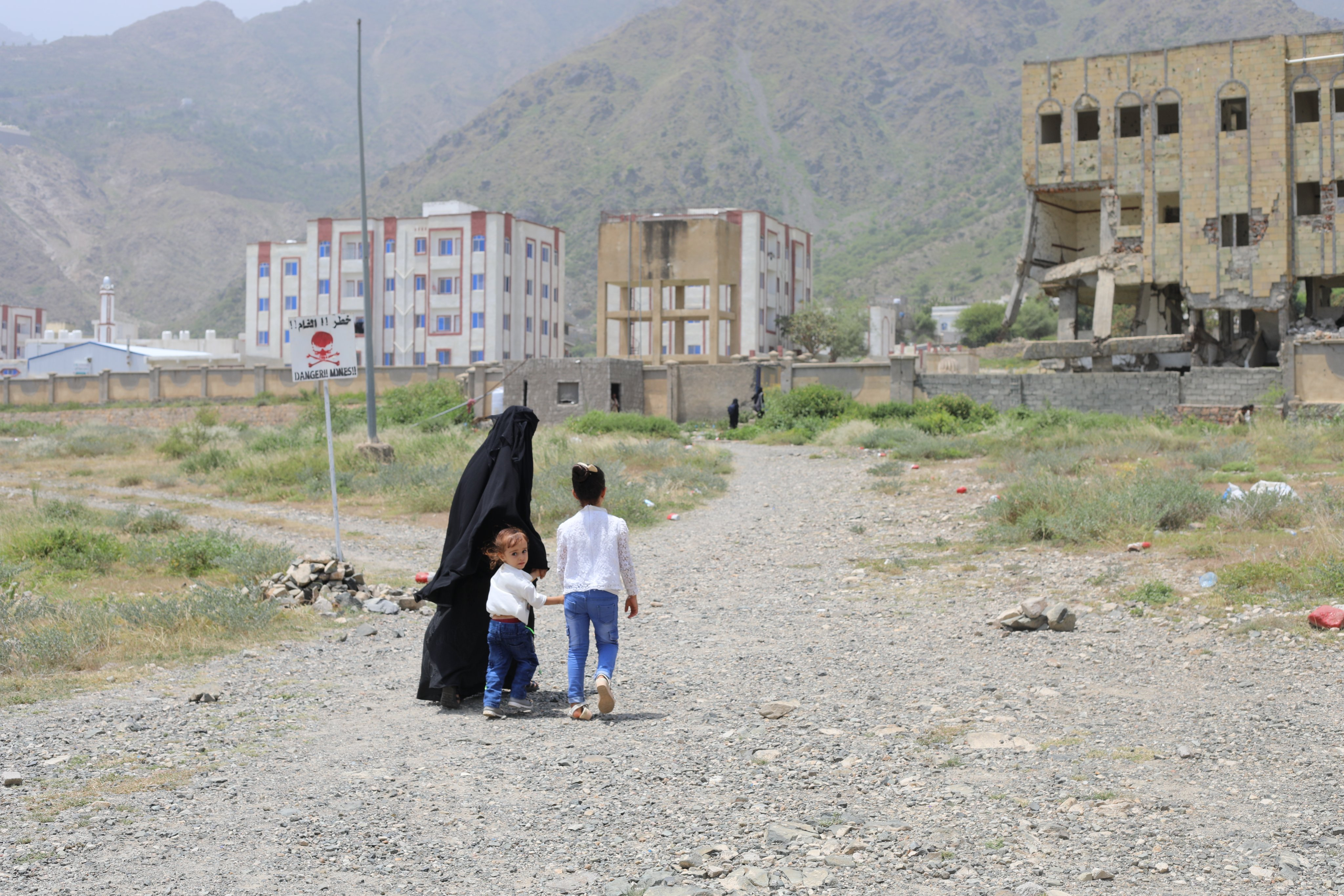
A mother and her children walk between minefields on an access lane cleared by Project Masam in Taiz, Yemen

Project Masam has significantly contributed to reducing the number of mine victims in Yemen over a period of five years.

In July 2022, the United Nations Security Council's 9088th meeting commended Project Masam's efforts, saying:

"Furthermore, there is a need to prioritize measures regarding the protection of civilians, including by stopping all violations of the truce while clearing Yemeni land of mines and their remnants. According to United Nations reports, mines unfortunately continue to cause a large number of those killed and injured since the beginning of the truce. In this vein, we commend the King Salman Humanitarian Aid and Relief Centre through MASAM project for removing nearly 350,000 explosive remnants of the war so far. Such important humanitarian efforts help save countless lives at a time when the Houthi militias are ignoring the safety of the population and causing damage and destruction throughout Yemen."

== Local awareness campaigns ==
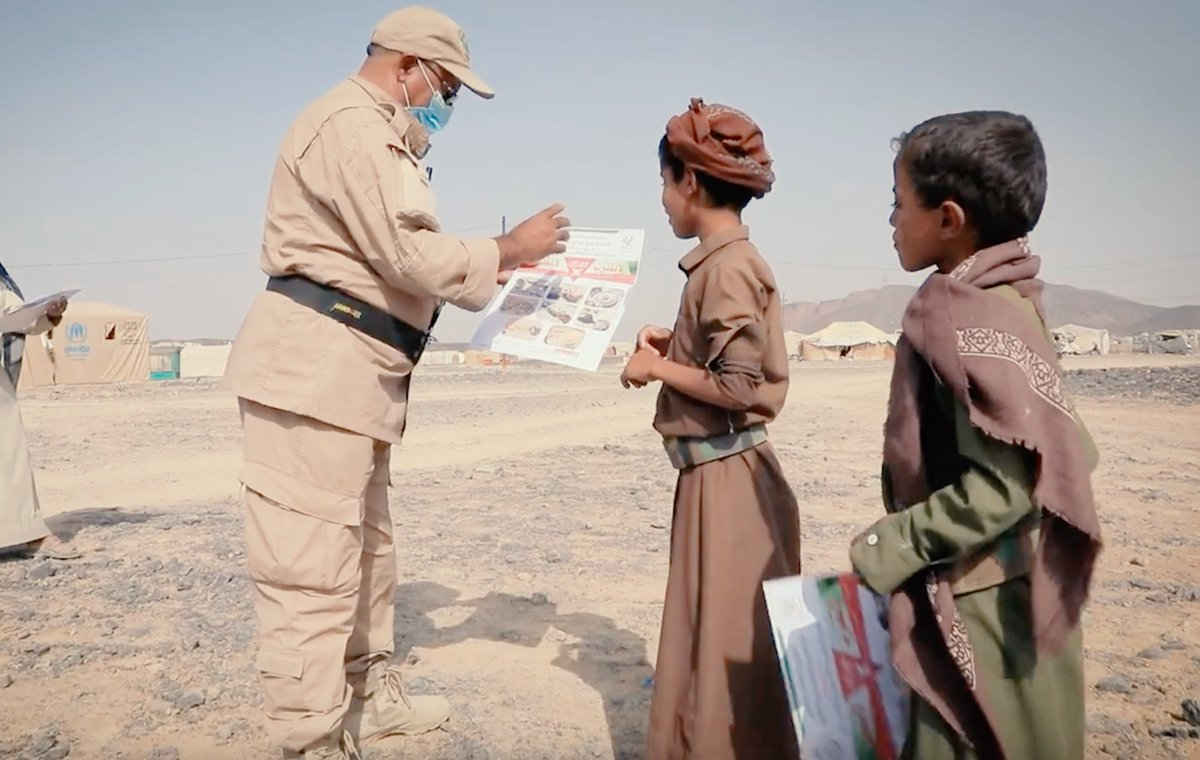
A deminer of Project Masam carries out Mine Risk Education in Yemen.

In Yemen, Project Masam regularly carries out awareness campaigns and Explosive Ordnance Risk Education (EORE, used rather than the former term, mine risk education (MRE)) as part of its initiatives aimed at raising community awareness of the dangers of mines, and targets populations of all ages and gender.

"EORE is the tool to make the public aware and ensure they are part of making their country safe. We also target groups in areas we suspect to be Dangerous Areas because of the history of the area especially where there were previous conflicts taking place," according to Project Masam's Project Manager and Technical Advisor Loedie Voges.

An eight-year-old girl, Radwa Muthana Nagi Al-Gini, was playing next to her house in the Al-Shakhb neighbourhood in the Qa'atabah District of the governorate of Dhalea, when she stumbled on a Houthi landmine.

The child said she had learned about the different types of landmines found in Yemen, and the importance of not touching them through awareness campaigns conducted by Project Masam teams.

She said: "The Masam teams distribute papers and posters to the residents to educate them about landmines. Those papers and posters are also found on the walls of schools and houses, and this helped me identify the landmine which was similar to those found in the posters."

As part of the project's ongoing advocacy support, Project Masam sponsored the Human Rights Office in Yemen's Marib region's first forum to support and advocate for landmine victims in partnership with Hemaya Organization for Civil Orientation (HOCO). More than 100 participants, including human rights activists and civil society organisations, as well as local dignitaries, participated in the event held on 4 June. These included the Undersecretary of Marib Governorate, Dr. Abd Rabbuh Muftah and the Director of the Human Rights Office in Marib Governorate, Abd Rabbuh Jaday.

The forum aimed to discuss mechanisms for redress for victims at the national and international levels and to enhance accountability, in addition to networking among active actors who support and defend landmine victims' material and moral rights. The forum also shed light on the mechanisms that are meant to ensure the integration of mine accident survivors – by referring or linking them to available training and rehabilitation programmes, job opportunities, and projects of local and international organisations, as well as ensuring their right to reparation, their participation in the Yemeni peace talks, and their place in any future political settlements.

== International advocacy efforts ==
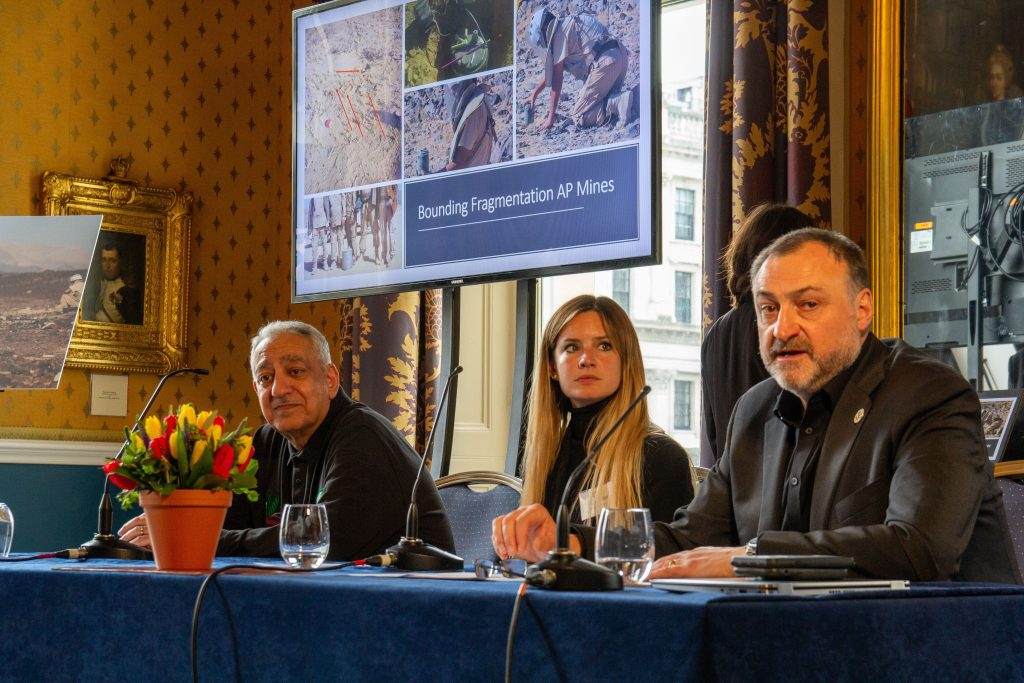
Project Masam Managing Director Ousama Algosaibi, Media Consultant Elsa Buchanan and Director of Special Operations Chris Clark hold panel discussion and awareness campaign at event in London, United Kingdom.

Despite the Houthis being a signatory of the Stockholm Agreement, which requires the group to hand over details of what explosives have been planted and detailed maps outlining where they are located, progress has failed to materialise, according to Arab News.

In 2023, the Yemeni Ministry of Legal Affairs and Human Rights claimed the Houthis refused to hand over maps of the mines planted to the United Nations, calling on the international organisation and the Security Council to take deterrent measures against the group.

Since launch in June 2018, Project Masam has been campaigning on the local, national, regional and international stage for the Houthis to assist with mine clearance across the whole country by handing in maps, coordinates and any other relevant information pertaining to the location of minefields.

"In Yemen, there are no maps, no information, absolutely no one in Yemen has seen a map or coordinates of minefields or fenced minefields or a warning sign of a minefield that Al Houthi have planted in Yemen," the project's Managing Director Ousama Algosaibi told TV channel Yemen Today.

Using the hashtag #HandInTheMaps, the project has been advocating for the United Nations and relevant agencies, international governments and policy makers to pressure the Houthi leadership to hand over the maps to prevent more civilians from being killed and injured by explosive items.

"That has not happened to date. So as far as our work is concerned, I have not seen any improvements," Algosaibi said.

During a meeting with the European Organisation of Islamic Centres at the United Nations international conference building in Geneva, Switzerland, on 2 May 2024, Algosaibi reiterated his serious concerns about the delay in the international community's response to the ongoing manufacturing, and extensive and indiscriminate planting of landmines and improvised explosive devices by the Houthis and allied organisations.

== Awards and recognition ==
In 2023, Rashad Al-Alimi, the chairman of Yemen's Presidential Leadership Council, granted the "Medal of Bravery" (also known as the "Order of Courage") to his country's Executive Mine Action Center and Project Masam.

The award is in recognition of the project's efforts in clearing land mines on Yemeni soil.

In August 2023, the Faculty of Sharia and Law of the University of Saba Region in the eastern Yemeni governorate of Marib Governorate awarded Project Masam with a Shield of Loyalty in recognition of its mine clearance work in the region.

In November 2023, the Yemeni Minister of Health Dr. Qassem Bahaibah presented an award, the Shield of Humanity, to Qasim Al-Dossary, Assistant Managing Director of Project Masam in recognition of the project's efforts in removing thousands of landmines that were deliberately planted across Yemen.
