= Saada prison airstrike =

Saada prison airstrike may refer to:

- 2022 Saada prison airstrike, Saudi-led coalition airstrike in Yemen
- 2025 Saada prison airstrike, US airstrike in Yemen
