= Human shield =

Non-combatants placed around a target to discourage enemy attacks

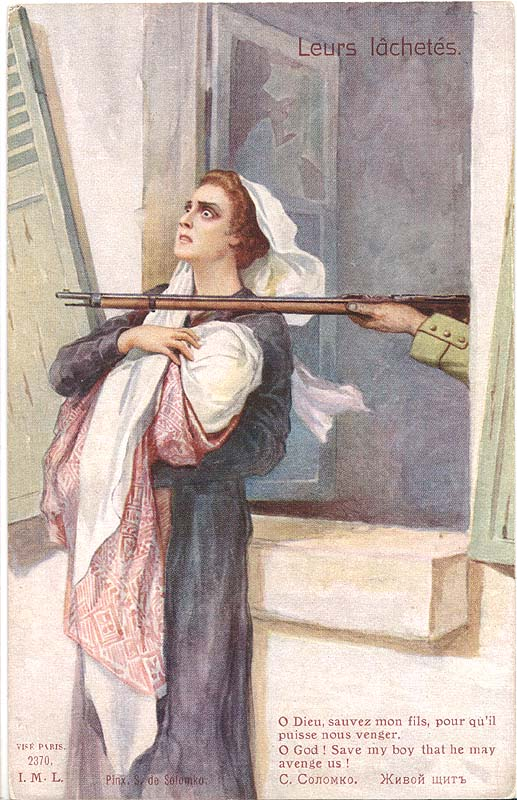
Human shield war postcard by Sergey Solomko

A human shield is a non-combatant (or a group of non-combatants) who either volunteers or is forced to shield a target in order to deter the enemy from attacking it. The 20th and 21st centuries had numerous operations that used involuntary human shields. Use of voluntary human shields have also had use, particularly with Mahatma Gandhi using the concept as a tool of resistance.

== Legal background ==
A human shield is a non-combatant (or a group of non-combatants) who either volunteers or is forced to shield a legitimate military target in order to deter the enemy from attacking it. Forcing protected persons to serve as human shields is a war crime according to the 1949 Geneva Conventions, the 1977 Additional Protocol I to the Geneva Conventions, and the 1998 Rome Statute. The term is also used when combatants place themselves in or conduct military activity from locations with non-combatants nearby, making it difficult for the enemy to attack without endangering the non-combatants.

Under Article 28 of the Fourth Geneva Convention, it is prohibited to use civilians to render military objectives immune from attack. This prohibition includes human shields under customary international law and Article 51(7) of the 1977 Additional Protocol I to the Geneva Conventions. The law specifically holds that medical units shall not be used in an attempt to shield military objectives from attack. Using civilians as human shields may constitute a war crime. But even in the case of a breach of international humanitarian law by one party, all parties remain bound by their IHL obligations.

According to law professor Eliav Lieblich, "Armed groups might be responsible for harm that they occasion to civilians under their control. But to argue that this absolves the other party from responsibility is to get both law and morality wrong."

Law professor Adil Ahmad Haque states that involuntary shields "retain their legal and moral protection from intentional, unnecessary, and disproportionate harm". He argues against the position of the United States Department of Defense (as well as the United Kingdom and some scholars) that attackers may discount or disregard collateral harm in determining proportionality and states that these views are "legally baseless and morally unsound".

Authors Neve Gordon and Nicola Perugini, elaborating on their book, Human Shields: A History of People in the Line of Fire, discuss "proximate shields", humans as shields merely due to proximity to belligerents and assert that this type has become "by far the most prominent type of shield in contemporary discourse". They say that the proximate shielding accusation has been used by states to cover-up war crimes against civilian populations and that human rights organizations frequently fail to question this charge which they claim is being improperly used to justify civilian deaths.

== Involuntary human shields ==
The use of human shields can be traced to the Ancient era; for example they were used by Ancient Greeks.

=== 20th century ===
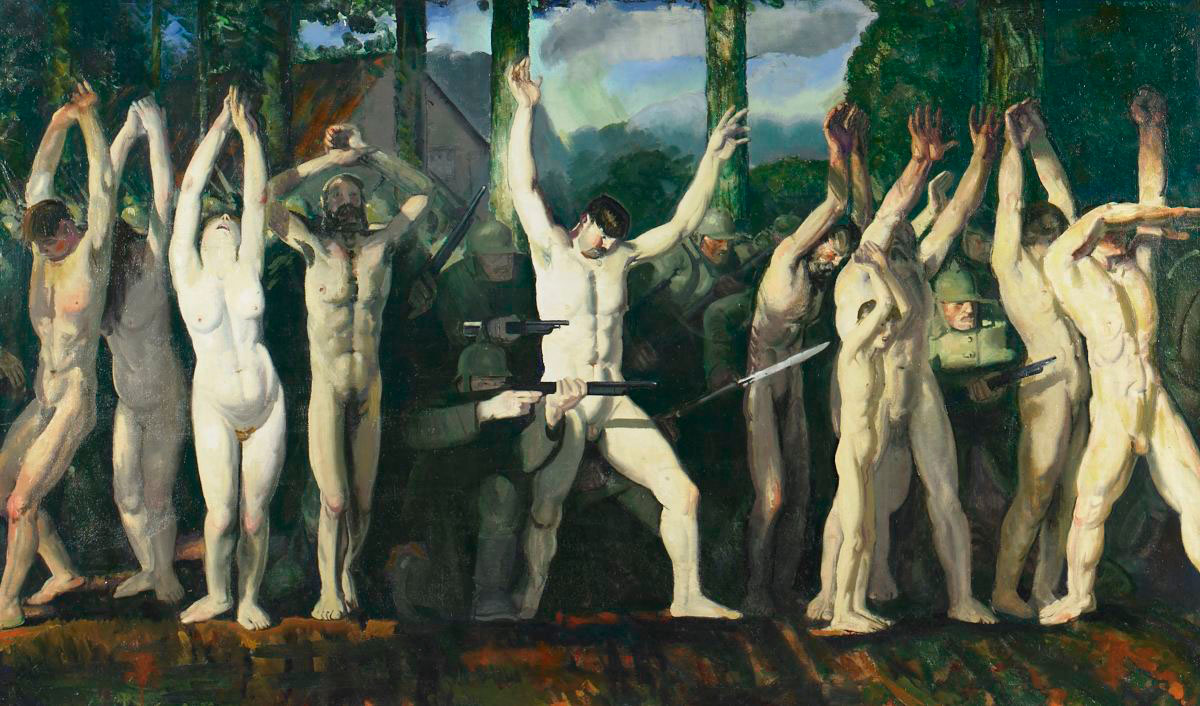
The Barricade by the American artist George Bellows, inspired by an incident in August 1914 where German soldiers used Belgian civilians as human shields

==== World War I ====
Article 23 of the 1907 Hague Convention (IV) states that "A belligerent is forbidden to compel the nationals of the hostile party to take part in the operations of war directed against their own country". The 1915 report says "If it be not permissible to compel a man to fire on his fellow citizens, neither can he be forced to protect the enemy and to serve as a living screen".

==== Italian invasion of Ethiopia ====
During the Second Italo-Ethiopian War, the army of Fascist Italy systematically bombed medical facilities in Ethiopia operated by various Red Cross societies. Italy accused Ethiopia of using hospitals to hide weapons and fighters.

==== 1936–1939 Arab revolt in Palestine ====
In the British mandate of Palestine, Arab civilians and rebels who were captured by the British during the Great Arab Revolt were frequently taken and placed on "pony trucks", "on which hostages could be made to sit"; these were placed at the front of trains to deter other rebels from detonating explosives on the railways. A soldier with the Manchester Regiment described the technique:

They would "go down to Acre jail and borrow say five rebels, three rebels, and you'd sit them on the bonnet, so the guy up in the hill could see an Arab on the truck so he wouldn't blow it... If [the rebel] was unlucky the truck coming up behind would hit him. But nobody bothered to pick the bits up. They were left."

The practice began on 24 September 1936 when Brigadier J. F. Evetts reacted to Palestinian rebel attacks against British positions in Nablus by forcing the city mayor, Suleiman Abdul Razzaq Tuqan, to sit exposed on the roof of a garrison building under fire, as a 'high-value human shield'. Tuqan returned his Order of the British Empire commendation in protest.

==== World War II ====
On 14 August 1937, in what historians Evgenia Vlasova and Lianggang Sun refer to as "the first major battle of World War II in Asia" in Asia between China and the occupying forces of the Empire of Japan at the Battle of Shanghai, the Imperial Japanese Navy berthed their flagship Izumo in front of the Shanghai International Settlement; it is believed in what would become known as "Black Saturday", Chinese Air Force Gamma 2E bomber pilots targeted the Japanese warship, but had to release the bombs at a much lower altitude than they usually trained for due to low cloud ceiling, and did not properly reset their bomb sights, which resulted in two of the 1,100 lb bombs falling short and landing on the adjacent International Settlement (one failing to explode) and killing at least 950 Chinese civilians, foreigners and refugees.

After World War II, it was claimed by SS general Gottlob Berger that there was a plan, proposed by the Luftwaffe and approved by Adolf Hitler, to set up special POW camps for captured airmen of the Royal Air Force and the United States Army Air Forces in large German cities, to act as human shields against their bombing raids. Berger realized that this would contravene the 1929 Geneva Convention and argued that there was not enough barbed wire—as a result, this plan was not implemented.

Wehrmacht and later SS forces extensively used Polish civilians as human shields during Warsaw Uprising when attacking the insurgents' positions. In the Wola massacre in Poland on 7 August 1944, the Nazis forced civilian women onto the armored vehicles as human shields to enhance their effectiveness.

In Belgium in May 1940, at least 86 civilians were killed by the German Wehrmacht in an event known as the Vinkt Massacre, when the Germans took 140 civilians and used them as shields to cross a bridge while under fire by Belgian forces. As the battle progressed, German soldiers began executing hostages.

During the Battle of Okinawa and the Battle of Manila, Japanese soldiers often used civilians as human shields against American troops.

When the Japanese were concerned about the incoming Allied air raids on their home islands as they were losing their controlled Pacific islands one by one to the Allies in the Pacific War, they scattered major military installations and factories throughout urban areas. Historians argued that this meant Japan was using its civilians as human shields to protect their legitimate military targets against Allied bombardment. As a result, the U.S. Army Air Forces (USAAF) was unable to strike purely military targets due to the limitations of their bombsight, the mixing of military installations and factories with urban areas, and the widespread cottage industry in Japan's cities. This led the USAAF in early 1945 to switch from precision bombing to carpet bombing, which destroyed 67 Japanese cities with incendiary bombs, and ultimately led to the use of atomic bombs on the Japanese cities of Hiroshima and Nagasaki.

==== Algerian War ====
In 1960s Algeria, during the Algerian War, France used civilians as hostages and human shields in its fight against the National Liberation Army.

==== Iraqi–Kurdish conflict ====
In 1963, a Ba'athist tank unit in Kirkuk covered its assault on a Kurdish suburb with a human shield of Kurdish women and children.

==== Korean War ====
In the Battle of the Notch, North Korean forces were claimed to have used captured U.S. soldiers as human shields while advancing.

==== Lebanese Civil War ====
In August 1976, at the Siege of Tel al-Zaatar, Christian Lebanese militias alleged that the Palestinians at Tel al-Zaatar were using Lebanese families inside the camp as human shields.

==== 1982 Lebanon War ====
During the 1982 Lebanon War, the Palestinian refugee camp of Ain al-Hilweh was surrounded by Israeli forces as the last stronghold of Palestinian militants in southern Lebanon, but "Soldiers of Allah" militants commanded by the Muslim fundamentalist Haj Ibrahim refused to surrender: Their motto was "Victory or death!" Over a two-day period, Israeli forces under the leadership of Brigadier General Yitzhak Mordechai repeatedly announced "Whoever does not bear arms will not be harmed" and urged civilians in the camp to evacuate, but few did. Three delegations of prominent Sidon figures were sent to persuade Haj Ibrahim's fighters that "their cause was hopeless, and whoever was willing to lay down his arms would be allowed to leave the camp unharmed." None of the delegations were successful; the first was prevented from approaching the fighters by "a spray of bullets", while the third "returned with the most harrowing tale of all": "Militiamen were shooting civilians who tried to escape. In one particularly grisly incident, three children were shot because their father had suggested calling an end to the fighting." After a delegation of Palestinian POWs, "headed by a PLO officer who was prepared to give the defenders his professional assessment of Ein Hilweh's grave military situation", and an offer by Mordechai to "meet personally with" Haj Ibrahim were also rebuffed, "a team of psychologists ... was flown to Sidon to advise the command on how to deal with such irrational behavior." However, "the best advice the psychologists could offer was to organize yet another but considerably larger delegation comprising some forty or so people and including women and children"; Haj Ibrahim responded to the fifth delegation with "exactly the same three words"; triggering a bloody battle in which Israeli troops finally took the camp.

According to 1982 Newsweek photo, Israeli soldiers were attacked by PLO fighters disguised as hospital patients.

==== Bangladesh ====
During the Chittagong Hill Tracts conflict in the 1970s, an account tells that throughout the conflict, the military burned the homes of the Jummas, carried out mass killings and rape of Jumma women, and placed Bengali settlers as human shields on the land of the Jummas near the military camps.

==== Iraq under Saddam Hussein ====
Saddam Hussein systematically used human shields in Iraq. According to a CIA report, he used the tactics at least since 1988.

===== Gulf War =====
One of the most well-known uses of human shields occurred in Iraq in 1990, following the Iraqi invasion of Kuwait that precipitated the Gulf War of 1990–1991. Saddam Hussein's government detained hundreds of citizens of Western countries who were in Iraq for use as human shields in an attempt to deter nations from participating in military operations against the country. A number of these hostages were filmed meeting Hussein, and kept with him to deter any targeted attacks, whilst others were held in or near military and industrial targets. He used both Westerners and Iraqi civilians.

In 1991, during the operations in the Gulf War, the U.S. submitted a report to the UN Security Council denouncing Iraq for having "intentionally placed civilians at risk through its behavior". The report cited the following examples of such behavior:

- The Iraqi government moved significant amounts of military weapons and equipment into civilian areas with the deliberate purpose of using innocent civilians and their homes as shields against attacks on legitimate military targets.
- Iraqi fighter and bomber aircraft were dispersed into villages near the military airfields where they were parked between civilian houses and even placed immediately adjacent to important archaeological sites and historic treasures.
- Coalition aircraft were fired upon by anti-aircraft weapons in residential neighborhoods in various cities. In Baghdad, anti-aircraft sites were located on hotel roofs.
- In one case, military engineering equipment used to traverse rivers, including mobile bridge sections, was located in several villages near an important crossing point. The Iraqis parked each vehicle adjacent to a civilian house.

==== Al-Qaeda ====
In the aftermath of the 1998 United States embassy bombings, Osama bin Laden stressed that he would have committed the attacks even if his own children were being used as human shields.

==== Bosnian War ====
Shortly after the cease-fire between Croat and Serb forces, the Army of Republika Srpska launched an assault against the safe area of Goražde, heavily shelling the town and surrounding villages. Protests and exhortations from the UN Security Council were ineffective, and on 10 and 11 April 1994, NATO launched air strikes against Bosnian Serb positions. In retaliation, Bosnian Serb forces captured UN personnel within their areas of operation and used them as human shields at sites expected to be bombed. In a similar situation to what had happened in Sarajevo, an ultimatum was issued, and by the 24th, most of the Serb troops had complied.

=== 21st century ===
==== War in Afghanistan ====
According to various accounts, including that of the American ambassador to the U.N., the Taliban used women and children from their own population as human shields against coalition forces in 2006, 2007, and 2008, during the war in Afghanistan.

==== Lord's Resistance Army ====
According to Human Rights Watch 2004 report, the Lord's Resistance Army used children as human shields, porters, and laborers.

==== Abu Sayyaf ====
In 2018, several Abu Sayyaf militants were arrested in the Philippines, among them being a "key man" of the group. The arrests occurred after clashes in Sabah and Putrajaya, where Abu Sayyaf allegedly used children as human shields against the Philippine army.

==== Iran ====
===== Flight 752 =====
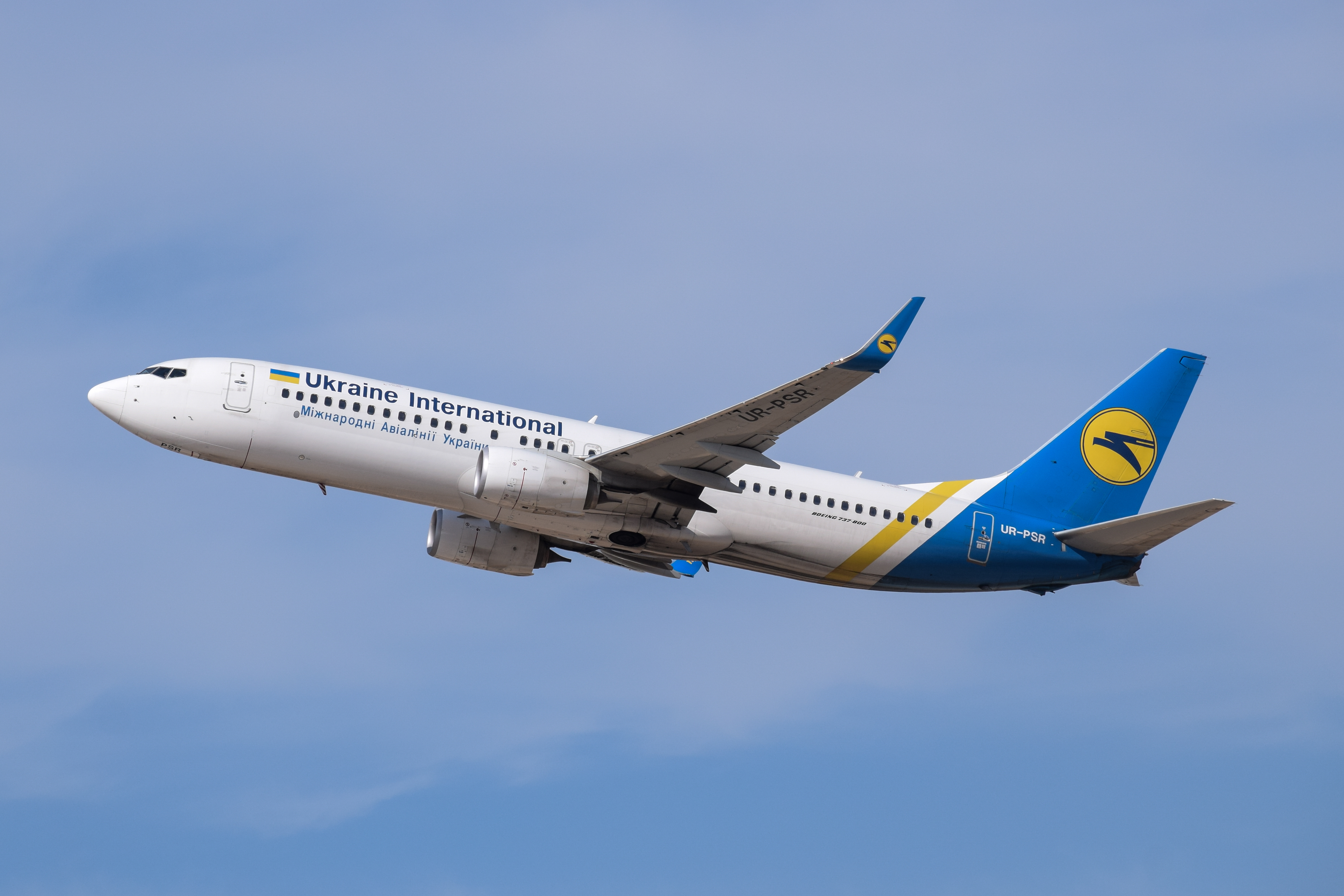
UR-PSR, the Boeing 737-800 shot down by the IRGC while operating Ukraine International Airlines Flight 752 on 8 January 2020. It has been speculated that Iran did not close its civil airspace following its attack on U.S. forces and used civilian airliners - along with their passengers and crew - as human shields in an attempt to avoid retaliatory strikes.

In the aftermath of Iran's shoot down of Ukraine International Airlines Flight 752 in January 2020, Iran and the Islamic Revolutionary Guard Corps were accused of using civilian aircraft and their passengers and crew as human shields.

According to The New York Times: "They also hoped that the presence of passenger jets could act as a deterrent against an American attack on the airport or the nearby military base, effectively turning planeloads of unsuspecting travelers into human shields." Canada's Minister of Transport Marc Garneau also questioned why Iran let civilian aircraft in its airspace, and suggested Iran intended to use the civilian aircraft as human shields.

==== Boko Haram ====
In 2015, the Islamist group Boko Haram has abducted some 500 women and children to serve as human shields.

In 2016, it was reported the group kidnapped schoolgirls "used as human shield[s]".

==== Houthis in Yemen ====
Houthis have been known to use human shields in their war in Yemen at least since 2016, as from a UN report at the time.

In 2018, the Houthis were accused by the Yemeni government of use of human shields Amnesty International warned that the Houthis are "militarising" hospitals.

On 1 September 2019, the Houthis were reported to have used human shields during the Dhamar airstrike by putting detainees near weapons storage facilities.

On 27 September 2019, UAE media reported that the Houthis blocked food from reaching civilians used as human shields.

==== Myanmar ====
In 2014, a report noted that Myanmar's army abducts civilians and forces them to act as guides and human shields.

==== Venezuela ====
In August 2017, Venezuelan president Nicolas Maduro has been accused of turning to civilians for "human shields" against the US. Freddy Guevara, an opposition deputy, branded cowardly the actions of adding civilian personnel and the reserve to carry out military exercises and face a possible US attack.

In April 2020, it was reported that Nicolas Maduro had imprisoned hundreds of opposition members to use as human shields in a potential US invasion.

==== Israeli–Palestinian conflict ====
Human shields have been used by the Israel Defense Forces (IDF) during the Israeli–Palestinian conflict, with instances being widely documented in the Second Intifada, and notably recurring in the 2008–2009 Gaza War, the 2014 Gaza War and the Gaza war.

The use of human shields by the IDF was banned in October 2005, when the Israeli Supreme Court said the practice violated international law. The independent human rights NGOs B'tselem and Amnesty International have stated that ample evidence exists in conflicts after that date that Israel has employed Palestinians as human shields. According to B'tselem, the practice goes back to 1967. In 2010, two Israeli soldiers were convicted of using for using a Palestinian boy during the 2008–2009 Gaza War.

The charge has been leveled against Palestinian groups frequently by numerous observers. Neve Gordon and Nicola Perugini have noted how Israel has used the charge as part of its 'infowar' on social media, to justify the high ratio of civilian vs military casualties in its attacks on civilian facilities and infrastructures in Gaza. In Operation Cast Lead 100 Gazans died for every Israeli, and the civilian ratio was 400 Gazans to 1 Israeli. Israeli spokesmen explained the difference by alleging that Hamas used civilians as shields. It has been argued that no evidence has come to light proving these claims. Amnesty International investigated the incidents which resulted in the largest number of civilian casualties, finding that these casualties were not the result of human shielding. During the Gaza war, the European Union and US President Joe Biden condemned the use of human shields by organizations such as Hamas. Janina Dill, a laws of war professor at University of Oxford, stated, "Even if Hamas uses civilians as human shields, those civilians are entitled to full protection under international law unless they directly participate in the fighting".

Amnesty International investigated claims made by Israel in the 2008–2009 Gaza War and the 2014 Gaza War that Hamas employed human shields, and said that "storing munitions in civilian buildings or launching attacks from the vicinity of civilian buildings" and public statements directing civilians to stay at home do not amount to using human shields.

==== Iraq War ====
During the 2003 Invasion of Iraq, a group of people chose to travel to Iraq to act as human shields. Their purpose was to prevent American-led coalition forces from bombing certain locations. Of about 200 to 500 human shields who traveled to Iraq before hostilities, at least eighty stayed.

U.S. Army Cavalry Scout Scott Ewing, who served in Iraq in the 2005–2006 period, stated that U.S. troops would give candy to Iraqi children so they would stay around their vehicles, thereby making more likely that enemies would not attack them.

==== Lebanon War ====
An Australian journalist claimed during the 2006 Lebanon War that Hezbollah used Lebanese civilians as human shields to dissuade the IDF from firing at gunmen and rocket launchers. Human Rights Watch conducted its own investigation and reported that Hezbollah did not "deliberately" use civilians as a deterrent from IDF attack. HRW did however conclude Hezbollah stored weapons "in or near civilian homes" and fighters launched rockets within populated areas and near UN observers. HRW also accused Hezbollah of using Lebanese homes as sites for rocket launchers, usually without the homeowner's knowledge or permission, putting large numbers of civilians at risk.

On July 25, 2006, Israeli forces attacked and destroyed a UN observer post in southern Lebanon, resulting in four deaths. One of the fatalities, Canadian Major Paeta Derek Hess-von Kruedener, had sent an e‑mail to his former commander, retired Major-General Lewis MacKenzie, several days before his death in which he described the Israeli bombardment, writing "The closest artillery has landed within two meters of our position and the closest 1,000 lb aerial bomb has landed 100 meters from our patrol base. This has not been deliberate targeting, but rather due to tactical necessity". MacKenzie interpreted this language for a reporter: "What that means is, in plain English, 'We've got Hezbollah fighters running around in our positions, taking our positions here and then using us for shields and then engaging the (Israeli Defence Forces).'" A senior UN official, replying about Major Hess-von Kruedener's e-mail concerning Hezbollah's presence in the area of the UN base, said "At the time, there had been no Hezbollah activity reported in the area. So it was quite clear they were not going after other targets; that, for whatever reason, our position was being fired upon." He went on to claim that the Israelis were told where the UN base was and that it was clearly marked but they bombed it anyway.

==== Siege of Lal Masjid ====
According to the Pakistan Army spokesman, Islamic militants used girls as human shields in Pakistan during the 2007 Siege of Lal Masjid. The mosque's head cleric denied the allegations.

==== Sri Lankan Civil War ====
According to a Human Rights Watch report published on 19 February 2009, the LTTE had been preventing Tamil people civilians from fleeing out of rebel held area and using them as human shields against the Sri Lankan Army offensive. The report outlines that according to the NGO's own findings, the human rights violations "include deliberate, indiscriminate, and disproportionate attacks on civilians, hostage taking, and use of human shields". This is concluded in the report's own recommendations to the LTTE, stating that the use of human shields as well as the placing of military targets near civilian populations being a war crime as per the International Humanitarian Law found in IHL. Sri Lankan government's Maxwell Paranagama Commission stated that the LTTE was principally responsible for the loss of civilian life during the final phase of the armed conflict through their action to use fleeing Tamil civilians as Human Shields clearly differing with the Darusman Report.

==== Libyan Civil Wars ====
During the First Libyan Civil War, Gaddafi loyalists were acting as human shields in the Libya no-fly zone, to try to protect Gaddafi's compound and airports.

In March 2016, during the Second Libyan Civil War, it was reported that two Italians who had been kidnapped in June 2015 were killed while they were used as human shields by Islamic State gunmen in Sorman.

==== Syrian Civil War ====
===== ISIS in Syria =====
ISIS has ideologically justified use of Muslims as human shields.

The Islamic State (ISIL) militants, Saudi-supported the Syrian branch of al-Qaeda, and Jaysh al-Islam anti-Assad rebels were accused of using civilian residents of towns, Alawite civilians and captured Syrian soldiers as human shields.

On the use of human shields by ISIS in Syria, most notably was in 2019 as reported by SDF: The jihadists were using the civilians as human shields to block. The civilians were "on the front lines".

==== ISIS in Iraq ====
Among publicized examples of Islamic State ISIS militants using human shields in Iraq: in 2016, Islamic State militants rounded up thousands of villagers at gunpoint to use as human shields. This practice was repeated in April 2017 in Mosul.

==== Russian invasion of Ukraine ====
During the 2022 Russian invasion of Ukraine, Russian soldiers held over 300 Ukrainian civilians as human shields in the basement of the school of Yahidne, where a Russian military camp was located; dozens of civilians died in the process. BBC found "clear evidence" of Russian troops using Ukrainian civilians as human shields in Obukhovychi, near the Belarusian border, where 150 people were held at the local school. Local residents reported that Russian forces leaving the village of Novyi Bykiv used Ukrainian children as human shields.

==== Jammu and Kashmir ====
On 9 April 2017, during the Srinagar Lok Sabha by-election, a 26-year-old man captured by the Indian Army was tied to the front of a Jeep belonging to Indian Army as a column of Indian troops was moving through a locality. The man was reportedly tied to the vehicle to dissuade other Kashmiri insurgents from hurling stones at the Indian troops. The man was accused of being involved in throwing stones at Indian troops. The Government of India stated that it would stand by the officer who took the decision to use the insurgent as a human shield. J&K Human Rights Commission asked the Government of Jammu and Kashmir to pay 10 Lakh Rupees as compensation to the man used as human shield, however the Jammu and Kashmir government refused to pay.

==== 2023 Israel–Gaza War ====
Hamas has been accused of using human shields in the Gaza Strip, purposely attempting to shield itself from Israeli attacks by storing weapons in civilian infrastructure, launching rockets from residential areas, and telling residents to ignore Israeli warnings to flee. Hamas has denied using civilians and civilian infrastructure, including hospitals, as human shields.

Israel has said that Hamas's actions have caused Israel to kill civilians as collateral damage. Human rights groups have said that "even if Hamas were using human shields", Israel must still abide by international law, especially the principle of proportionality.

According to Israeli professor Neve Gordon, co-author with Nicola Perugini of Human Shields: A History of People in the Line of Fire there is a double standard, with Israel blaming Hamas for using human shields whereas the Israeli civilians living near military bases, including those in central Tel Aviv and Beer Sheba, are not considered human shields. In November 2023, Cambridge University professor Marc Weller said that "The very fact that we have seen 44 [Israeli] soldiers killed in [the Israeli invasion of the Gaza Strip] and almost 11,000 [Palestinian] civilians gives an indication that the calculation of proportionality in Gaza has left the bounds of reasonableness."

Scholars Nicola Perugini and Neve Gordon argue that Israel's accusations against Palestinian resistance groups of using civilians in hospitals and other civilian structures have been used to justify the calculated destruction of the entire Palestinian healthcare infrastructure in Gaza to create conditions of life leading to the destruction of Gaza Palestinians as a group, as also corroborated in the UN report Anatomy of Genocide and in the March 2024 UN Commission of Investigation Report. In an article in Jewish Currents, Perugini and Gordon maintain that the accusation of using human shields has been employed by Israel against the Palestinian population of Gaza to justify genocidal acts of violence, which have been under investigation at the International Court of Justice since December 2023 in the case of South Africa vs. Israel for violations of the Genocide Convention.

The Israeli Defense Forces have been accused of using Palestinians as human shields. On 17 January 2024, Israeli soldiers were recorded pointing a gun at a Palestinian shop-owner, Baha Abu Ras, in Dura, Hebron, West Bank, with one soldier guiding the shop-owner ahead of other following soldiers. Baha later reported that one of the soldiers said they intended to use him as a human shield. Israel's government says it was dispersing of a riot in which suspects hurled Molotov cocktails at their forces. A 21-year-old man from Gaza City stated to Al Jazeera that he had been used as a human shield by Israeli forces. According to Haaretz, New York Times and Washington Post investigations based on many Israeli soldiers' testimonies, Palestinian teenagers and adults are regularly used as human shields in exploring the tunnel network in the Gaza Strip. In November 2024, Defence for Children International reported on three separate incidents, during October 15–20, 2024, of families with young children being used as human shields to protect the Israel Defense Forces in attacks at the Jabalia refugee camp and Indonesia Hospital.

==== 2025 India–Pakistan standoff ====
On 9 May 2025, the Indian foreign secretary and the representatives of the Indian armed forces claimed that Pakistan was using civilian airliners as a shield during an alleged drone attack on Indian military infrastructure, and alleged it was allowing flights to operate near the border to potentially to deter an Indian air defense response. The prime minister of Pakistan claimed that India initially launched its strikes when 57 international flights were in the country which "endangered lives". Previously on 7 May, Pakistan temporarily closed all airports and extended the closure of its airspace in some of the country's northern areas until 10 May. During the conflict most international airlines avoided Pakistan, instead taking routes over gulf countries, with some jets remaining in its airspace.

== Voluntary human shields ==
=== Decolonization of India ===
Indian revolutionary Mahatma Gandhi is credited with creating the concept of human shield as a tool of resistance.

=== Anti-war activists ===
In recent years civilians have volunteered to serve as "human shields" to prevent military conflict. In January 2003, anti-war activists organised Human Shield Action to Iraq in advance of the March 2003 invasion. Ultimately, Human Shield Action brought 200 people to Iraq. Many of them left as they ran out of money and the likelihood of war became greater. Several of these human shields had to be rescued by U.S. Marines after Iraqis threatened them for opposing the invasion of their country.

=== Pro-Palestinian activists ===
Rabbis for Human Rights agreed to act as "human shields" during the annual olive harvest to protect Palestinian villages from settlers. Rachel Corrie and Tom Hurndall, Western International Solidarity Movement (ISM) volunteers in the Palestinian territories, who died in 2003 and 2004 respectively have been described as "human shields" campaigning against house demolition. ISM, however, strongly takes offence at the use of the term human shield to describe their work, preferring it be used only to refer to when armed combatants uses civilians as shields. Not even Amnesty International defines volunteer activist's actions or activist's actions for non-military property as "human shields", and regards only the direction of "specific civilians to remain in their homes as "human shields" for fighters, munitions, or military equipment" as "human shields".

== See also ==
- Brinkmanship
- Civilian casualties
- Close combat
- Falling on a grenade
- Hostage
- Human rights in Israel
- Human rights in the Palestinian National Authority
- Human wave attack
- Urban warfare
