= Haydan district =

Coordinates: 16°50′N 43°33′E

Haydan District
- District
- Interactive map of Haydan District
- Country: Yemen
- Governorate: Sa'dah

Population (2003)
  - Total: 60,331
- Time zone: UTC+3 (Yemen Standard Time)

Ḥaydan District (Arabic: مديرية حيدان) is a district of the Sa'dah Governorate, Yemen. As of 2003, the district had a population of 60,331 inhabitants.

Ḥaydan as-Sham (Arabic: حيدان) is the largest town in this northern district, nestled in the mountains, some 24.07 miles (38.74 km) as the crow flies from Sa'dah in a south-westerly direction. Access is had by travelling overland by four-wheel-drive vehicle and takes more than an hour to reach from Sa'dah because of the high and treacherous terrain. It was once home to a large Jewish community who have since settled in the land of Israel.
