= Ghamr district =

Coordinates: 17°02′N 43°27′E

Ghamr District
- District
- Interactive map of Ghamr District
- Country: Yemen
- Governorate: Sa'dah

Population (2003)
  - Total: 19,718
- Time zone: UTC+3 (Yemen Standard Time)

Ghamr District (Arabic: مديرية غمر) is a district of the Sa'dah Governorate, Yemen. As of 2003, the district had a population of 19,718 inhabitants.
