= Sa'ada University =

Yemeni university

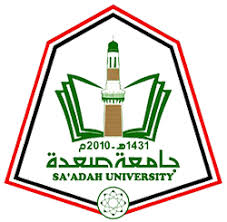
- Coat of arms
- Type: Public university
- Established: 2010
- Rector: Abdulrahim Al-Humran
- Location: Saada, Yemen

Sa'ada University is a university in Saada, Yemen.

== History ==
Yemen's president, Ali Abdullah Saleh announced the construction of the university in 2010, in order to better service the educational needs of people in Sa'ada province, who at the time had to travel to Sanaa for university education. Student enrolment dropped during the Yemeni civil war, and four buildings were damaged in a 2015 air strike.

As of June 2022, the rector is Dr. Abdulrahim Al-Humran.

== Notable alumni ==
- Ameen Jubran, (humanitarian), chemistry
