= Al Hashwah district =

Al Hashwah district مديرية الحشوة
- District
- Location in Yemen
- Coordinates: 16°50′N 44°20′E
- Country: Yemen
- Governorate: Sa'dah Governorate

Population (2003)
  - Total: 14,274
- Time zone: UTC+3 (Yemen Standard Time)

Al Hashwah district (Arabic: مديرية الحشوة) is a district of the Sa'dah Governorate, Yemen. As of 2003, the district had a population of 14,274 people.
