= Saqayn district =

Coordinates: 17°00′N 43°30′E

Saqayn District مديرية ساقين
- District
- Interactive map of Saqayn District
- Country: Yemen
- Governorate: Saada

Population (2003)
  - Total: 52,521
- Time zone: UTC+3 (Yemen Standard Time)

Saqayn District (Arabic: مديرية ساقين) is a district of the Saada Governorate, Yemen. As of 2003, the district had a population of 52,521 inhabitants.
