= Qatabir district =

Coordinates: 17°20′N 43°28′E

Qataber District Qatabir
- District
- Interactive map of Qataber District
- Country: Yemen
- Governorate: Sa'dah

Population (2003)
  - Total: 22,658
- Time zone: UTC+3 (Yemen Standard Time)

Qatabir District is a district of the Sa'dah Governorate, Yemen. As of 2003, the district had a population of 22,658 inhabitants.
