= Baqim district =

Coordinates: 17°20′N 43°30′E

Baqim District مديرية باقم
- District
- Interactive map of Baqim District
- Country: Yemen
- Governorate: Sa'dah Governorate

Population (2003)
  - Total: 22,965
- Time zone: UTC+3 (Yemen Standard Time)

Baqim District (Arabic: مديرية باقم) is a district of the Sa'dah Governorate, Yemen. As of 2003, the district had a population of 22,965 people.
