= Ameen Jubran =

Yemeni chemist and humanitarian (born 1984)

- Born: 1984 (age 41–42); Saada
- Education: Sa'ada University
- Organization: Jeel Albena Association for Humanitarian Development

Ameen Hussain Jubran (born 1984) is a Yemeni chemist and the founder of Jeel Albena Association for Humanitarian Development. In 2021, he accepted a Nansen Refugee Award on behalf of the organisation.

== Early life and education ==
Jubran was born in Saada, Yemen in 1984 and studied chemistry at Sa'ada University.

== Adult life ==
In 2017, during the Yemeni Civil war, Jubran founded Jeel Albena Association for Humanitarian Development not-for-profit organization. The organization provides relief to displaced people in the form of emergency shelter, non-food assistance, and protection services.

During the war, Jubran was displaced by violence four times, and was narrowly missed by an airstrike in 2018.

Jubran accepted the Nansen Refugee Award in 2021, on behalf of Jeel Albena.
