= Al-Hadi Mosque =

Mosque located in Sa'da - Yemen

Al-Hadi Mosque Al-Imam Al-Hadi Mosque
- Arabic: جَامِع ٱلْهَادِي, romanized: Jāmiʿ Al-Hādī; Arabic: جَامِع ٱلْإِمَام ٱلْهَادِي, romanized: Jāmiʿ Al-Imām Al-Hādī
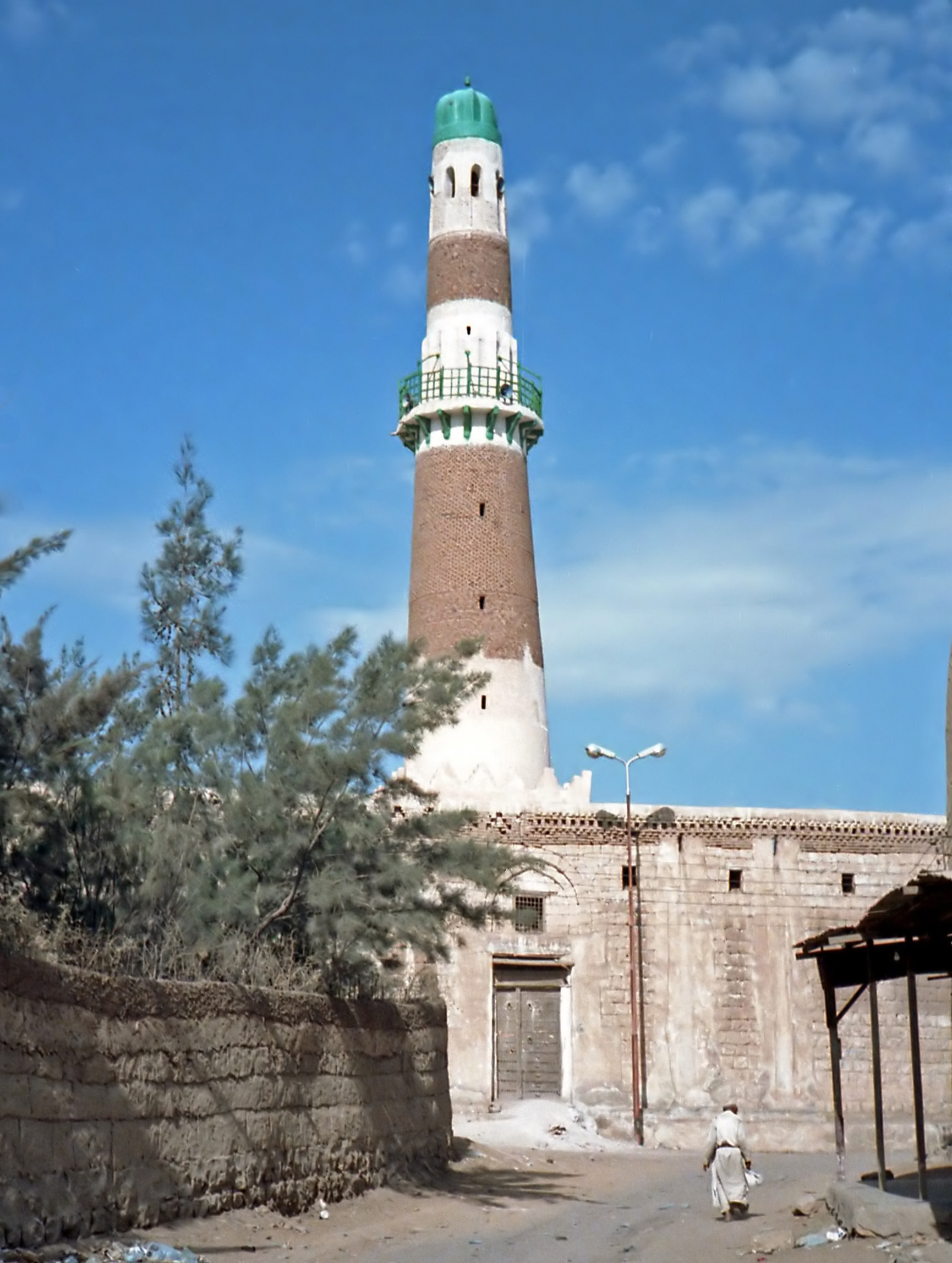
- Minaret of Al-Hadi Mosque

- Location in Yemen Al-Hadi Mosque (Middle East) Al-Hadi Mosque (Asia)

Religion
- Affiliation: Shia Islam
- Region: South Arabia / Middle East / West Asia
- Status: Active

Location
- Location: Sa'dah, Yemen
- Coordinates: 16°56′20.01″N 43°45′54.07″E

Architecture
- Type: Mosque
- Style: Islamic
- Completed: 897

Specifications
- Minaret: 2
- Minaret height: 52 metres (171 feet)

Al-Hadi Mosque (Arabic: جَامِع ٱلْهَادِي, romanized: Jāmiʿ Al-Hādī) or Al-Imam Al-Hadi Mosque (Arabic: جَامِع ٱلْإِمَام ٱلْهَادِي, romanized: Jāmiʿ Al-Imām Al-Hādī) is one of the historical mosques of the ancient city of Sa'ada, Yemen. It is located east–west of the city, was built in around 897 C.E., and is named after Imam Yahya Bin Al-Hussein, the founder of the state of Imams of Yemen. The mosque became the oldest place for the teaching of Zaidi maddhab in the Arabian Peninsula.

== History ==
The mosque is the third mosque in Yemen to be built adjunct with a minaret, after the Mosque of Farwa Ibn Masik, and the Great Mosque of Sana'a. It is also the oldest mosque attached to the houses of the Muhajirun. On May 9, 2015, the mosque was attacked by the Saudi-led coalition, which caused severe damage.

== Architecture ==
The mosque consists of an open courtyard in the centre surrounded by four corridors, the deepest of which is the qibla hallway. It can be accessed through thirteen doors. The two main minarets are located in the courtyard. One of them is among the tallest in Yemen, reaching around 52 meters high, while another one in the southern part of the courtyard is smaller. The complex contains many architectural elements influenced by different architectural styles, exemplified in the façade for instance. There is also a wooden platform in which the oldest part contains an inscription dating back to the year of 922, as well as eight wooden structures with various rows of Arabic ornaments. There are also numerous tombstones with engravings in the stone that illustrate the creativity, ability and skill of the calligraphers in Yemen throughout the Islamic ages. They also carried out the geometric, floral and inscriptive decorations on the walls of the mosque in a variety of plaster, regarded executed with unmatched perfection.

== See also ==
- Islam in Yemen
- List of mosques in Yemen
- Late medieval domes
