= Dhamar airstrike =

Saudi-led attack on a detention centre

- Part of the Saudi-led intervention in the Yemeni civil war and the Yemeni Civil War
- Location: Dhamar, Yemen
- Date: 1 September 2019
- Target: Houthis
- Attack type: Airstrike
- Deaths: 100+
- Injuries: 40 (Acc. to Red Cross)
- Perpetrator: Saudi Arabia led coalition

The Dhamar airstrike took place on 1 September 2019 when Saudi-led military coalition aircraft targeted a college building in Dhamar, Yemen that was used as a detention facility by the Houthis. According to the International Committee of the Red Cross (ICRC) in Yemen, the airstrike killed dozens of detainees.

== Airstrike ==
According to the ICRC, the Saudi-led coalition aircraft carried out an airstrike on a multistory building that served as a detention facility by the Houthis. Of the 170 persons detained at the building, 40 were treated by injuries and the rest were presumed killed. Saudi-led coalition spokesman Turki Al-Maliki denied targeting civilians and said the airstrike was aimed at a legitimate military target. A former detainee told the Associated Press that the Houthis were repairing weapons in and close to the detention center. Several other detainees said via social media that the center had been the target of airstrikes before. It was consistent with the Houthi practice of using human shields near detention facilities. Local residents said some of those detained were arrested for being critical of the Houthis.

== Aftermath ==
The Houthis released 290 detainees as part of a peace initiative of the United Nations (UN), 42 of which were survivors of the airstrike.

== See also ==
- 2022 Saada prison airstrike
- 2025 Saada prison airstrike
