= 2022 Saada prison airstrike =

Coalition attack in Yemen

- Part of the Saudi Arabian-led intervention in Yemen
- Location of the facility
- Location: 16.930440°N 43.733537°E; Saada, Yemen
- Date: 21 January 2022
- Target: Prison in Saada
- Attack type: Airstrike
- Deaths: 87+
- Injuries: 266
- Perpetrator: Saudi-led coalition

On 21 January 2022, according to news sources a Saudi-led coalition carried out an airstrike on a prison in Saada, Yemen, killing at least 87 people. The coalition denied targeting the center.

== Background ==
Since 2014, Yemen has been in a civil war between the UN-recognized government forces and members of the Houthi movement, leading to an intervention by a Saudi–led coalition against the Houthis.

On 17 January 2022, Houthi forces drone struck the Emirati capital of Abu Dhabi, killing three civilians and provoking international condemnation.

== Airstrike ==
On 21 January 2022, an airstrike hit a prison in the city of Saada in Yemen, killing at least 87 people and injuring more than 266 others. The prison was a detention center for migrant workers.

Fighter jets from the Saudi-led coalition bombed a makeshift prison in Saada Governorate, killing at least 87 prisoners. Those injured in the attack are still being rescued and those killed recovered from the rubble and medical aid is being provided. According to the report, 2500 prisoners were present in the jail at the time of the attack while rescue operations are still going on at the site.

The coalition denied targeting the detention center.

== Casualties ==
Doctors Without Borders (MSF) says about 200 people have been brought to only one hospital. Ahmed Mahat, head of the agency, told AFP "There are still many bodies at the site of the airstrike and many people are missing. At the moment it is very difficult to know how many people have been killed and it seems that this was a terrible act of violence."

== Aftermath ==
In an interview with media, the governor of Saada said that the hospitals were collapsed by corpses and injured, while the province, as well as the country, is in dire need of all kinds of medical equipment including medicines. At the time Hospitals in Yemen were urgently needed blood of any type

The coalition denied targeting the center and stated they will inform and share details with the Office for the Coordination of Humanitarian Affairs in Yemen (OCHA) and the International Committee of the Red Cross (ICRC). The coalition also stated that the target in Saada was not on no-targeting lists agreed upon with the OCHA, was not reported by the ICRC and did not meet the standards stipulated by the Third Geneva Convention for Prisoners of War.

== Reactions ==
- UN Secretary-General António Guterres said in a statement that "the violence and tensions need to be stopped immediately". That attacks on civilians and infrastructure are prohibited under international law. The statement added: "They remind all parties under international humanitarian law of their responsibility to ensure that civilians are protected from the dangers posed by military action. In this case, the precautionary principle should be followed according to the proportions".

== See also ==
- Dhamar airstrike
- 2025 Saada prison airstrike
