= Dubrava Prison =

Prison in Kosovo

- Interactive map of Dubrava Prison
- Location: Dubravë, near Istog, Kosovo; 42°45′41″N 20°31′46″E
- Status: Operational
- Capacity: 1,175
- Opened: 1986
- Managed by: Kosovo Correctional Service, UNMIK

The Dubrava Prison (Albanian: Burgu i Dubravës) is a correctional facility located near Istog, Kosovo. It is the largest prison in the country.

== Events ==
=== 1999 Dubrava Prison massacre ===
On 19 and 21 May Serbs bombed the prison, killing at least 23 Kosovo Liberation Army (KLA) members. A prison riot followed, during which Serbian forces killed more than 100 Albanians.

=== 2003 riot ===
Five inmates were killed and 16 injured during a riot that broke out on 4 September 2003 following protests over the living conditions in the prison. United Nations Interim Administration Mission in Kosovo (UNMIK) tried to peacefully end the protest but inmates set fire to their mattresses.

In 2019 a study on the quality of life in the prison was published.

== Sources ==
- Jelle Janssens (5 February 2015). State-building in Kosovo. A plural policing perspective. Maklu. pp. 124–. ISBN 978-90-466-0749-7.
- UN (2005). Yearbook of the United Nations 2003. Vol. 57. United Nations. pp. 425–. ISBN 978-92-1-100905-7.
- U.S. Department of State. Country Reports on Human Rights Practices for 2009. Government Printing Office. pp. 1599–. GGKEY:4948J6P5EWT.
- U.S. Department of State. Country Reports on Human Rights Practices for 2007. Government Printing Office. pp. 1623–. ISBN 978-0-16-081399-3.
