= Saada district =

Coordinates: 16°55′N 44°00′E

Saada district مُدِيْرِيَّة صَعْدَة
- District
- Interactive map of Saada district
- Country: Yemen
- Governorate: Saada Governorate

Population (2003)
  - Total: 58,695
- Time zone: UTC+3 (Yemen Standard Time)

Saada District (Arabic: مُدِيْرِيَّة صَعْدَة) is a district of the Saada Governorate, Yemen. As of 2003, the district had a population of 58,695 people.
