= Jeel Albena Association for Humanitarian Development =

Yemeni aid organisation

- Formation: 2017
- Headquarters: Al Hudaydah
- Founder: Ameen Jubran
- Website: https://www.jaahd.org/

Jeel Albena Association for Humanitarian Development, also known as Jeel Albena, is a Yemeni not-for-profit organisation, founded by Ameen Jubran in 2017. It won the Nansen Refugee Award in 2021.

== Nomenclature ==
Jeel is Arabic for generation and Albena is Arabic for building.

== Organisational history ==
Jeel Albena was founded by chemist Ameen Jubran (born 1984) in June 2017. The organisation has the motto “By Yemenis, for Yemenis.” In September 2021, Jeel Albena had over 150 employees.

Jeel Albena won the Nansen Refugee Award in 2021.

== Activities ==
Jeel Albena's headquarters are in Al Hudaydah and it provides skills training and shelter provision in the Al Hudaydah, Hajjah, Al Mahwit and Raymah areas of Yemen.
