= Al Dhaher district =

- District
- Location in Yemen
- Coordinates: 16°50′N 43°25′E
- Country: Yemen
- Governorate: Sa'dah

Population (2003)
  - Total: 22,394
- Time zone: UTC+3 (Yemen Standard Time)

Al Dhaher district (Arabic: مديرية الظاهر) is a district of the Sa'dah Governorate, Yemen. As of 2003, the district had a population of 22,394 inhabitants.
