= Nicola Perugini =

Nicola Perugini is an anthropologist and political scientist who works as an associate professor in international relations at the University of Edinburgh. Perugini has co-authored three books: Human Shields: A History of People in the Line of Fire (2020), The Human Right to Dominate (2016) and Morbid Symptoms (2017). He co-edited Palestine and the Western Academe: Fighting the Exception, Defending Epistemic Justice (2025) with Walaa Alqaisiya. Nicola has published articles on different topics, including war and the ethics of violence; the politics of human rights, humanitarianism and international law; humanitarianism's visual cultures; war and embedded anthropology; refugees and asylum seekers; law, space and colonialism; settler-colonialism; epistemic justice; and the question of Palestine. He is currently working on a research project entitled "Decolonising the Civilian", which examines national liberation wars, international law and the status of civilians in armed conflicts.

Perugini is the co-author of the section "The University of Edinburgh and the Question of Palestine: Balfour's Imperial Legacy and its Afterlife" in the Edinburgh University Race Review (2025, p. 44–55, and appendix). The publication marks a significant milestone in the University's commitment to confronting and addressing its historical and contemporary ties to slavery, racism and colonialism. As one of the most extensive and academically rigorous reviews of its kind, the Race Review represents over four years of research, consultation and collaboration, revealing complex and often uncomfortable truths about the institution's past. It also outlines immediate reparatory measures and long-term commitments to ensure lasting, transparent and community-driven change, including divestment from companies involved in human rights and international law violations in the occupied Palestinian territories.

In 2024, he co-created La pelle sotto. Decolonizzare Villa Marina (The Skin Underneath. Decolonizing Villa Marina) for Pesaro 2024, Italy's Capital of Culture. This research-art project examines the colonial legacy of Villa Marina, a former fascist youth colony, combining archival research, community testimony, photographic installations and public dialogue to confront Italy’s colonial past and reimagine the future of this historic site. It features Sun-Baths, a 200m² immersive installation transforming the space into an environment for reflection and engagement; 7 Interferences, a series of artistic interventions challenging the site's historical narratives; and Rethinking the Colony, a public forum that concluded the project, fostering discussion with the community about the colony's complex legacy and future.

Perugini has been a member of the Institute for Advanced Study at Princeton (2012/2013), a Mellon Postdoctoral Fellow at Brown University (2014–2016), a Marie Skłodowska-Curie Fellow (2017–2019) and a Leverhulme Trust Research Fellow (2022/2023). He has taught at the American University of Rome, the Al Quds Bard College in Jerusalem (where he also directed the Human Rights Program), Brown University and the University of Bologna. He has been a member of the British Society for Middle Eastern Studies Council (2019–2022). He has served as consultant for UNESCO and UN Women. In 2011, Nicola was the co-recipient of the UNESCO-Greece Melina Mercouri International Prize for the Safeguarding and Management of Cultural Landscapes for the Battir Cultural Landscape Project (Palestine).

His opinion pieces have appeared in Al Jazeera English, London Review of Books, Jewish Currents, Al-Akhbar, Al-Ayyam, TRT, Newsweek, Internazionale, il manifesto, La Repubblica, The Nation, the Huffington Post, The Conversation, Just Security, Open Democracy, Counterpunch, The Herald, The National, Middle East Eye, Jadaliyya, +972 Magazine and e-flux.
