= Saada =

Saada صَعْدَة
- City
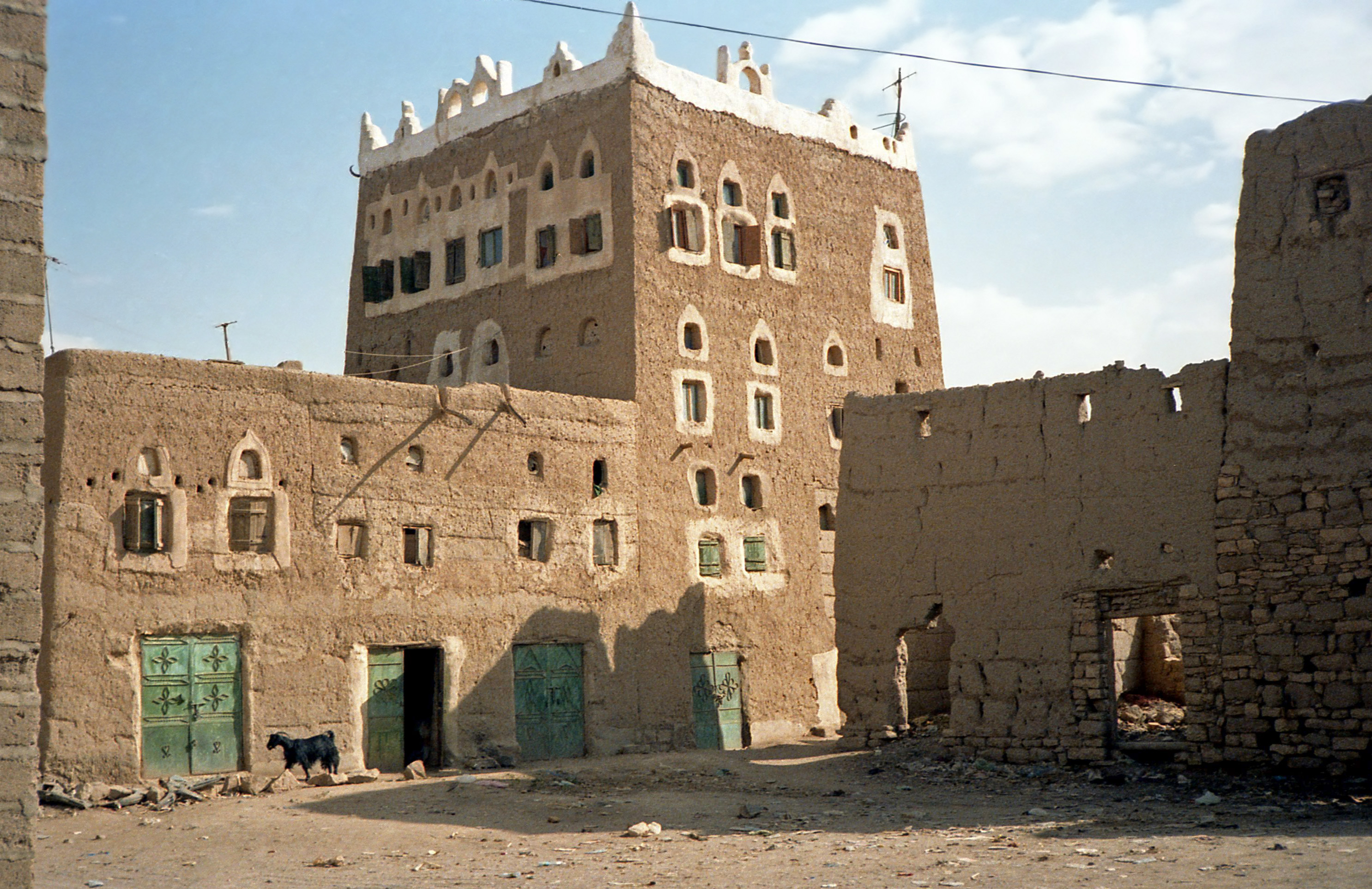

- Location in Yemen
- Coordinates: 16°56′24″N 43°45′33″E
- Country: Yemen
- Governorate: Saada
- District: Saada

Government
  - Type: Houthis
- Elevation: 1,836 m (6,024 ft)

Population (2004)
  - Total: 51,870
- Time zone: UTC+3 (Yemen Standard Time)
- Climate: BWh

Saada, (Note: Arabic: صَعْدَة, romanized: Ṣaʿda) situated in the northwest of Yemen, is the capital and largest city of the governorate of the same name, and the seat of the eponymous district. The city is located in the mountains of Serat (Sarawat) at an altitude of about 1,800 meters. In 2004, it was the tenth-largest city in Yemen and had an estimated population of 51,870.

The map of Yemen included Saada since the reign of the Ma'in Kingdom, the earliest country in the history of Yemen.

Saada is one of the earliest medieval cities in Yemen, the birthplace of the Shiite sect of Islam in Yemen, and the base of the regime of the Zaydi Imam of Yemen. From the beginning of the 9th century to the 20th century, the Rassid dynasty, the longest reigning dynasty in Yemen history (the dynasty's direct line was replaced by the collateral dynasty Qassem dynasty since the end of the 16th century), made its fortune in Saada.

Saada is also the base camp of the Houthis and the birthplace of the Houthi movement. It has been under the control of the Houthis since the end of the Yemeni revolution and was the first city to split from the central government in Yemen during the ongoing Yemeni crisis.

== History ==
=== Founding and Middle Ages ===
About the 14th century BC, the Ma'in people established the first country in the history of Yemen, the Ma'in Kingdom, in the present-day al-Jawf Governorate (the eastern neighbouring province of today's Saada Province). At its peak, the Ma'in Kingdom started from Hadhramaut in the south and reached Hejaz (Hijaz) in the north. Today, the area where Saada is located is also within the territory of the Ma'in Kingdom.

After the decline and fall of the Ma'in Kingdom in the 7th century BC, Saada belonged to the Kingdom of Sheba, the Kingdom of Himyar, the Aksum Empire in Ethiopia, the Sassanid Dynasty in the Persian Empire, and the Arabian Empire. Less than 4 years after the establishment of the second dynasty of the Arab Empire, the Abbasid dynasty, due to the dissatisfaction of the Yemenis with the tyranny of the governor of the empire, the Saada region in the north of Yemen and the Hadhramaut region in the south broke out against the rule of the Abbasid dynasty uprisings but were eventually suppressed by the authorities.

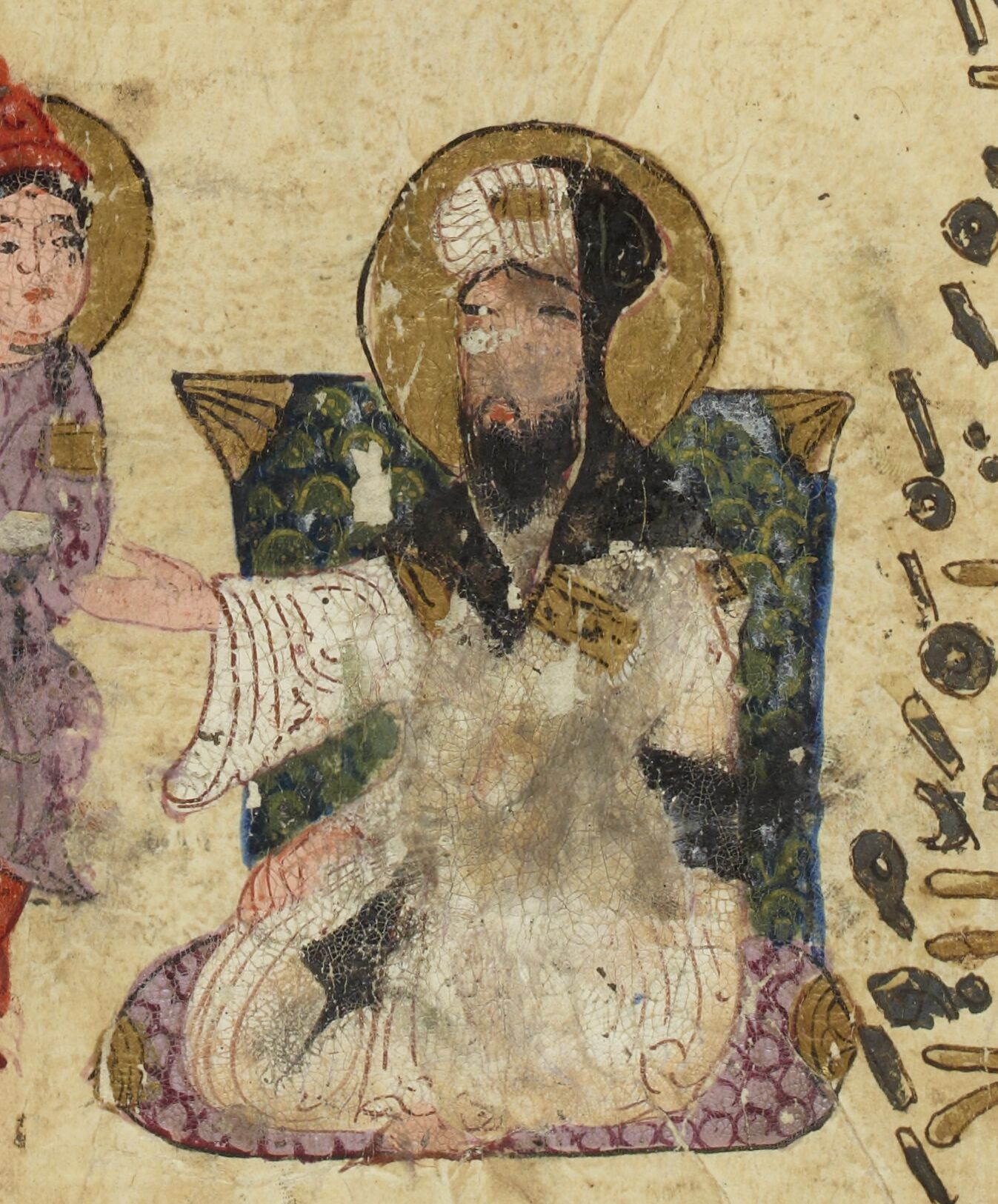
The Qadi of Sa'dah, Yemen, in 1200–1210, according to the Maqamat al-Hariri (BNF 3929)

In the later period of the Abbasid Dynasty, the warlords were divided, and the centralized power existed in name only, and various territories of the empire, including Yemen, established a group of independent or semi-independent regimes of the caliphate of Baghdad. At the beginning of the 9th century, the saint who lived in the holy city of Medina in Islam (the descendant of Hasan ibn Ali, the second Shia imam who claimed to be the Hashemite family), the theologian Al-Qasim al-Rassi formulated the teachings of Zaid, a Shiite sect. At the end of the 9th century, Qasim's grandson Yahya bin Hassan decided to preach in Yemen and develop the cause of the Zaydis. In 893, Yahya came to the north of Yemen to promote the teachings of Zaydism, but at first he did not get the support of the local people, so he returned to his hometown of Medina. In 896, some tribal leaders from the Saada and Howran areas in northern Yemen invited Yahya to return to Yemen to mediate local tribal conflicts. In 897, Yahya returned to Saada with his uncle Muhammad bin Qasim (son of Qasim Rasi) and some other followers, successfully mediating the local tribal conflict and obtaining their Support and allegiance, and are embraced as their leader, titled "Imam Hadi" ("Imam" and "Hadi" both mean leader in Arabic). Imam Hadi Yahya ordered the construction of the city of Sa'da, where the Imam regime of the integration of state and religion was established, and Sa'da became the birthplace and permanent foothold of the Zayd faction in Yemen. The land, Saada is also the first surviving city with a unique Arab-Islamic architectural style, and the Zaydis are still one of the most influential Islamic sects in Yemen. Since Imam Hadi Yahya's hometown was in Ras Hills in Medina, his grandfather Qasem Rassi was named "Rasi" (Arabic means those who live in Ras Hills). Because of his nickname, the dynasty he created was called the "Lasi Dynasty". It was the longest reigning dynasty in Yemen's history (893–1962), more than a thousand years, and Sada was the birthplace of the Lassi Dynasty.

Since the founding of the city in the Middle Ages, Saada has been a trading hub for the export of goods north of Yemen to what is today Saudi Arabia. Caravans on the spice road pass through villages around Saada. The medieval old city of Saada was built in traditional ways, and around the old city there is a bustling new town with typical streets, garage-like workshops and typical Arabian-style shops.

After Imam Hadi Yahya died, his sons successively served as Imams, but the teachings of the Zaid sect stipulate that as long as they are holy descendants (that is, descendants of Muhammad, the founder of Islam of the Hashemite family), they can be selected as Imams. Imams are not necessarily hereditary. Nonetheless, the vast majority of Yemen's imams are descendants of the Rathi dynasty (the collateral Qasim dynasty since 1597). The Yemeni Imam Dynasty ruled from time to time, and it was conquered by foreign invaders such as the Fatimid Dynasty, the Ayyubid Dynasty, the Mamluk Sultanate and the Ottoman Empire, and it has also experienced Rasul The rule of Yemen native dynasties such as Dynasty and Tahir Dynasty, the succession of Laxi Dynasty was not continuous. Although Sa'da's status as the capital of the Imam's regime is often replaced by other cities (such as Sana, Sahara, Surah, Taiz, etc.), the mountainous northwest of Yemen where Sa'da is located has always been the Imam Dynasty the last fortress.

=== North Yemeni independence and Yemeni unification ===
The Ottoman Empire was defeated and disintegrated in World War I, and the northern Yemen region under the former Ottoman Empire, including Saada, gained full independence in 1918. The Imam of the Qasem dynasty of the Zaydisi, Yahya Muhammad Hamid al-Din ("Imam Mutawakil"), announced the establishment of the Mutawakkilite Kingdom of Yemen, and put his respect No. is included in the country name. In September 1962, the "Freedom Officers" organization headed by Abdullah al-Sallal launched a military coup in the capital, Sana, to overthrow the Qasem dynasty and establish the Yemen Arab Republic. The Qassem royal family and the monarchist forces first fled from Sana to the northern mountainous area centered on Saada, and then to neighboring Saudi Arabia, where they fought against the republican faction together with the northern tribes who supported the royal family, thus setting off a long-term crisis. Eight years of civil war in North Yemen. Yemen's monarchists were supported by Saudi Arabia, which is also a monarchy, while the republicans were supported by the United Arab Republic led by President Nasser. Sent troops to North Yemen to help the Republic resist the Monarchist faction.

During the civil war, the Saada area, the former royal base and the stronghold of the Zaydis, was an important town for the struggle between the republicans and the monarchists. On February 18, 1963, the Egyptian Vice President and Defense Minister Field Marshal Amer commanded the North Yemen Republican Army to capture the city of Saada, and Saada has been under the control of the republicans since then. Although the republican faction and the monarchist faction changed their offensive and defensive positions several times, the republican faction, even when it was at a disadvantage, repelled the monarchy's attack on Sada and successfully defended Sada. In July 1970, the civil war in North Yemen ended, the republican faction won the final victory, and the Arab Republic of Yemen was recognized by the international community, including Saudi Arabia. On May 22, 1990, the Arab Republic of Yemen in the north and the Democratic People's Republic of Yemen in the south announced their unification and established the Yemen Republic, and Sada has been under the rule of the Yemen Republic since then.

The northwestern mountainous area with Saada and its surrounding areas as the core was neglected economically, even though it was the base camp of the former royal family and the Zayde faction and the government of the Republic of Yemen had achieved formal national unification. Still not developed, the government of the Republic has no local authority. At the same time, Yemen's northern population, including Sa'da, is dominated by Zaydis believers and has long been at odds with the Sunni-dominated south. Although President Saleh, who united Yemen, was from the Zaid faction in the north (formerly the Arab Republic of Yemen), he used the power of neighboring Saudi Arabia in the 1994 civil war to defeat the separatist forces in the south, while the Zaid faction After the war complained that the Saleh government allowed the Wahhabis, who dominate Saudi Arabia, to have too much say in Yemen.

=== Houthi insurgency, Yemeni revolution, and Yemeni civil war ===
In 2004, an insurgency against Saleh's government was spearheaded in Sa'ada, led by the Houthi movement. The Houthi movement, formerly known as "Youth of Beliefs", was founded in 1992 in Saada province by Hussein al-Houthi, a religious and military leader from the Sadazaid Houthi tribe. Houthi, a former member of the Yemen House of Representatives and an opponent of Saleh's government, began preparing an armed rebellion against the government in 2004. But on September 1 of that year, he was killed in a battle between Sa'ada province and Yemen government forces. Afterwards, followers of Hassan Houthi changed the name of the "Youth of Beliefs" organization to "Houthi Movement" (the official name was changed to "Ansar Allah Movement", which means "God's Helpers") to commemorate him forever.

In 2009 and 2010, conflict between the Houthi movement and the Saleh government continued, including Operation Scorched Earth, a military offensive in the Saada Governorate which saw 20,000 refugees flee to Saada City, which marked Saudi Arabia's first involvement in the conflict. In February 2010, Houthis accepted the government's ceasefire proposal. In April, a United Nations team was allowed into Saada City.

At the beginning of 2011, when the upheaval sweeping the Arab world was ascendant, Yemen protested against President Saleh's attempt to amend the constitution and re-elected after 32 years in power. Because of the "Dignity Day" event, that year was also called the "Revolution of Dignity"), the Houthis also took the opportunity to make a comeback and the rebellion re-emerged. On February 27 of that year, Abdul-Malik al-Houthi, a leader of the Houthi movement from the Saada region and brother of the late leader Hassan Houthi, announced his support for anti-government demonstrators. In February and March of that year, thousands of protesters marched weekly in Saada from the old city gate to the barracks of government security forces. On March 18 (Friday, Sunday), government snipers opened fire on crowds participating in a large-scale protest in the capital, Sana, causing a large number of casualties. The actions of the government forces have sparked nationwide outrage and a large number of government members defecting on a day known as "Dignity Lord's Day". On March 19, in response to the previous day's "Journal of Dignity", Houthi fighters entered the city of Sa'ada and the Battle of Saada began. The Houthis fought fiercely with the armed forces of Sheikh Ottoman Mujali, a pro-government tribal leader in the city, and took control of the city on March 24. Hajar and members of the local government fled to the capital, Sanaa, and Houthi fighters set up military checkpoints at the entrance to Saada city. On March 26, the Houthis appointed Fares Manaa, a top arms dealer in the Middle East and a former ally of President Saleh, as the new governor of Saada Province, and announced the establishment of a government agency that was completely independent of the central government in Sanaa. The new government of Sa'ada has made Sa'ada the first city to break away from the central government in the ongoing Yemeni crisis.

Sa'ada has been under the control of the Houthis since the end of the Saddam campaign. In March 2015, the Houthis, which had taken control of the capital Sanaa and established themselves in the center, announced that they would overthrow the remnants of Hadi's government that had fled to the south to unify the country, triggering a new civil war.

In the new civil war, Yemen was hit by airstrikes by the Saudi-led coalition of Arab forces that intervened in Yemen's civil war. The air strikes hit the Imam al-Hadi Mosque in Saada, which was severely damaged. The mosque is the oldest Shiite mosque in the Arabian Peninsula and the third oldest in Yemen. In October 2015, coalition-led airstrikes destroyed the Médecins Sans Frontières hospital in Saada.

In January 2022, a Saudi-led coalition carried out an airstrike on a prison in Saada, killing at least 87 people.

== Environment ==
=== Geography ===
The northwestern mountainous area of Yemen where Saada is located in the Serat (Sarawat) Mountain area, which belongs to the remnants of the Asir Mountains (southern Hijaz Mountains) extending southward to Yemen, adjacent to Yemen. The plateau area in the northeastern part of Yemen, generally belongs to the tropical desert climate (Köppen climate classification: BWh), hot, dry and water-deficient, mainly animal husbandry. From a geological point of view, the northern area of the central Yemen mountains where Saada is located is a horst formed by crystalline rocks.

=== Climate ===
Sa'dah has a hot desert climate (Köppen climate classification: BWh).

Climate data for Sa'dah
Month	Jan	Feb	Mar	Apr	May	Jun	Jul	Aug	Sep	Oct	Nov	Dec	Year
Mean daily maximum °C (°F)	22.1 (71.8)	23.8 (74.8)	25.3 (77.5)	26.9 (80.4)	29.1 (84.4)	31.5 (88.7)	30.9 (87.6)	30.5 (86.9)	29.3 (84.7)	25.5 (77.9)	22.7 (72.9)	22.4 (72.3)	26.7 (80.0)
Daily mean °C (°F)	14.3 (57.7)	15.7 (60.3)	18.0 (64.4)	19.8 (67.6)	22.1 (71.8)	23.6 (74.5)	24.2 (75.6)	23.9 (75.0)	21.9 (71.4)	18.0 (64.4)	15.2 (59.4)	14.6 (58.3)	19.3 (66.7)
Mean daily minimum °C (°F)	6.5 (43.7)	7.7 (45.9)	10.7 (51.3)	12.7 (54.9)	15.1 (59.2)	15.8 (60.4)	17.5 (63.5)	17.3 (63.1)	14.6 (58.3)	10.6 (51.1)	7.7 (45.9)	6.8 (44.2)	11.9 (53.5)
Average precipitation mm (inches)	8 (0.3)	13 (0.5)	41 (1.6)	42 (1.7)	18 (0.7)	2 (0.1)	16 (0.6)	26 (1.0)	5 (0.2)	1 (0.0)	5 (0.2)	8 (0.3)	185 (7.2)
Source: Climate-Data.org

=== Fauna ===
Saada lends its name to the Yemen rock gecko (Pristurus saada), a reptile found in northwestern Yemen.

=== Demographics ===
In 2004, Saada had an estimated population of 51,870 (49,422 according to official statistics), making it the tenth-largest city in Yemen at the time. [1] In 2013, Saada's population was estimated at 70,203 people.

== Transportation ==
There is Saada Airport in the northwest of Saada (IATA code: SYE; ICAO code: OYSH), which has a runway of about 3,000 meters long and has no scheduled passenger flights. Saada Airport is one of Yemen's main airports operating domestic routes. Saada has a road leading to the capital Sanaa through Amran Governate. During the civil war in North Yemen, The monarchist armed forces repeatedly blocked this road between Sanaa and Saada to prevent republican control. There are also cross-border highways in Saada to Dhahran in Asir Province, Saudi Arabia, and cross-border highways to Najran, the capital of Najran Province, Saudi Arabia.

== Culture ==
Saada is one of the oldest medieval cities in Yemen and is of great significance to Yemen's historical, architectural, urban and spiritual values. Saada has been a stronghold of the Zaydis since the city was founded by Imam Hadi Yahya in the late 9th century. The ancient city of Sada has been prosperous for a long time. The buildings in the city continue to follow the architectural style of the Middle Ages without interruption and have a very typical land structure that represents the entire region. The wall of the ancient city of Saada is about 3,000 meters long and 4 meters thick. There are 52 watchtowers and 16 city gates on the city wall, the most famous of which are the "Yemen Gate" and the "Najlan Gate". There is an iron ore slag mountain in the city, the remnants of the mine artisan workshops are centuries old, and a fortress from the 16th to 18th centuries was built on the hill.

The Zaydis Muslim Cemetery outside the ancient city of Sa’da is the largest and oldest cemetery in Yemen, with countless elaborately carved tombstones erected in the cemetery. Outside the "Yemen Gate", there is an ancient cistern, and there are huge rocks with Neolithic carvings of now-extinct wild animals, as well as ibex and human figures, which are Yemen's oldest rock carvings. There are also four fortresses built outside the ancient city of Saada to guard the city: the three fortresses of Turmus, Alsama, and Sinara, and the fortress of Abra rebuilt by the Ottoman Turks. Ten small villages in the valley outside the city, with beautiful houses surrounded by farmland, vineyards and fruit trees.

There are 14 mosques built from the 10th to the 16th centuries in the ancient city, among which the Imam Hadi Mosque contains the first Zaydis Imam Hadi and his 11 successors. It is the oldest Shi'ite mosque in the Arabian Peninsula and the third oldest mosque in Yemen. It was heavily damaged in an airstrike in May 2015. Hadi Mosque and Nisari Mosque are both considered high-level educational and religious sites and have undeniable architectural value; various domes and minartets of mosques in Saada city are rare and beautiful; in addition, there is a mosque in the city for women to worship.

In 2010, President Saleh announced the construction of Sa'ada University.

Today, the tribes around Saada determine the fate of the city. Every Sunday, customers can buy carrots, carpets, silverware, electronic equipment and many other goods at Saada's market (Sunday Market). Saada is one of Yemen's main mass-market cities, with four bazaars.

=== Jews in Saada ===
The residents of Saada are mainly Zayids, but historically, it was also one of the main settlements of Yemeni Jews. Between the 17th and 20th centuries, Jews gathered in large numbers in Yemen, including Saada. At the beginning of the 19th century, there were about 1,000 Jews in the city of Saddah. The Jews, as merchants and craftsmen, especially silversmiths, influenced the fate of Saada economically, contributing to the sustainable construction and development of the city.

== Gallery ==
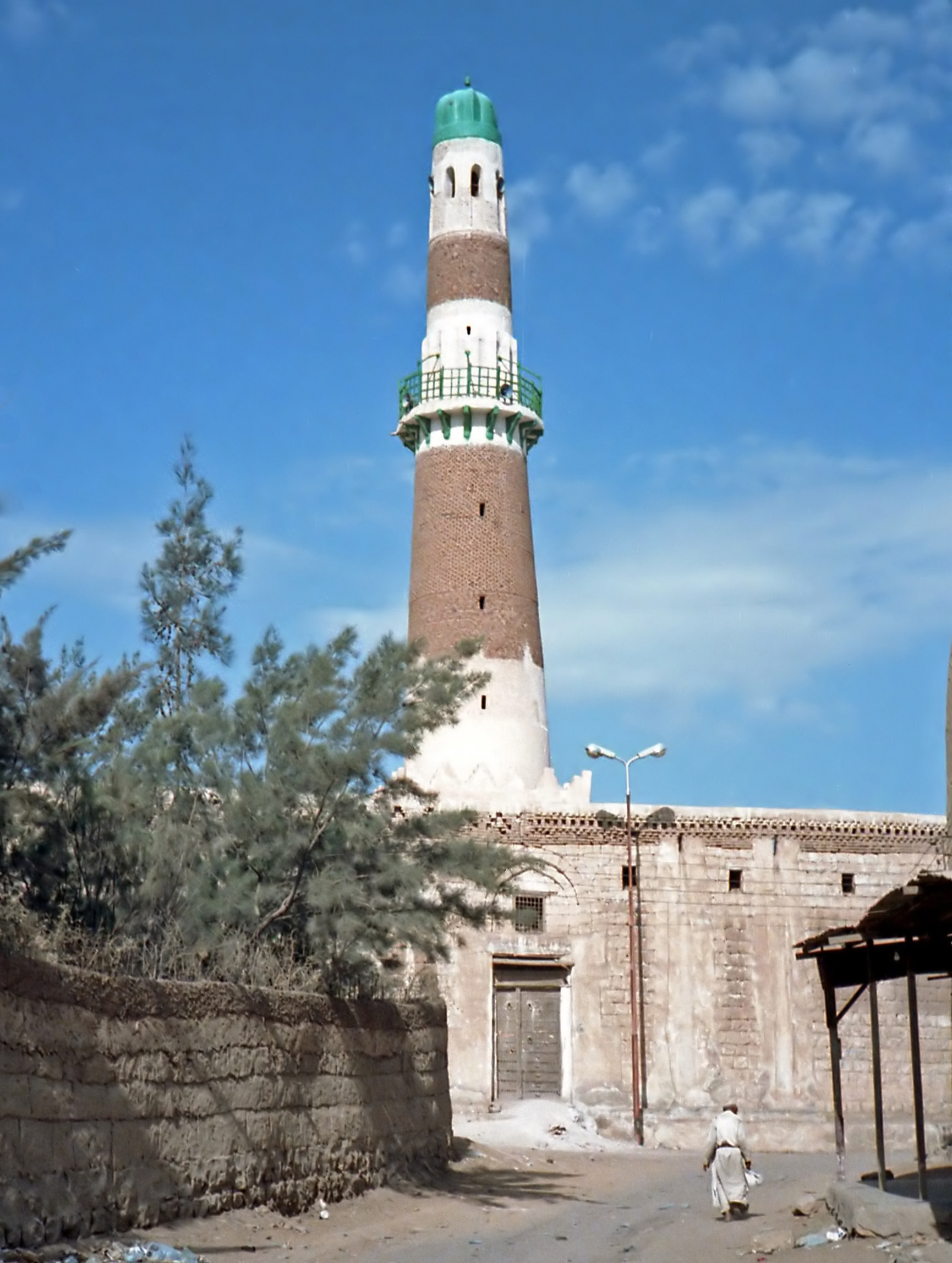
Sa'dah's Al-Hadi Mosque

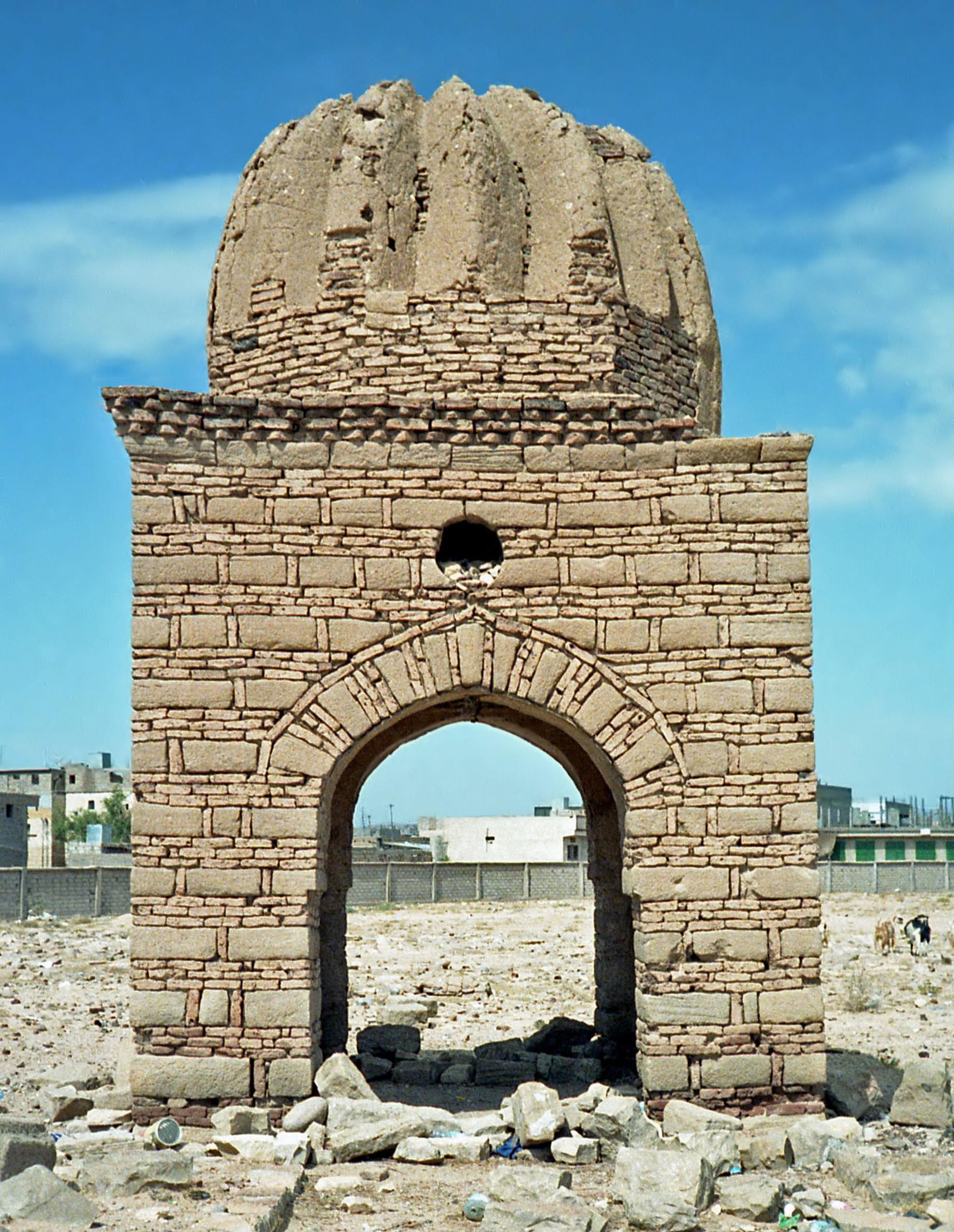
Islamic structure in Sa'dah

== Notable people ==
- Ameen Jubran, born 1984, founder of Jeel Albena Association for Humanitarian Development
- Abdul-Malik al-Houthi, born 1979, leader of the Houthi movement
- Yahya Saree, born 1970, military spokesman for the Houthi movement
- Issa al-Laith, born 1985, poet and vocalist affiliated with the Houthi movement
