= Saada Governorate =

Governorate of Yemen

Saada صَعْدَة Sa'dah
- Governorate
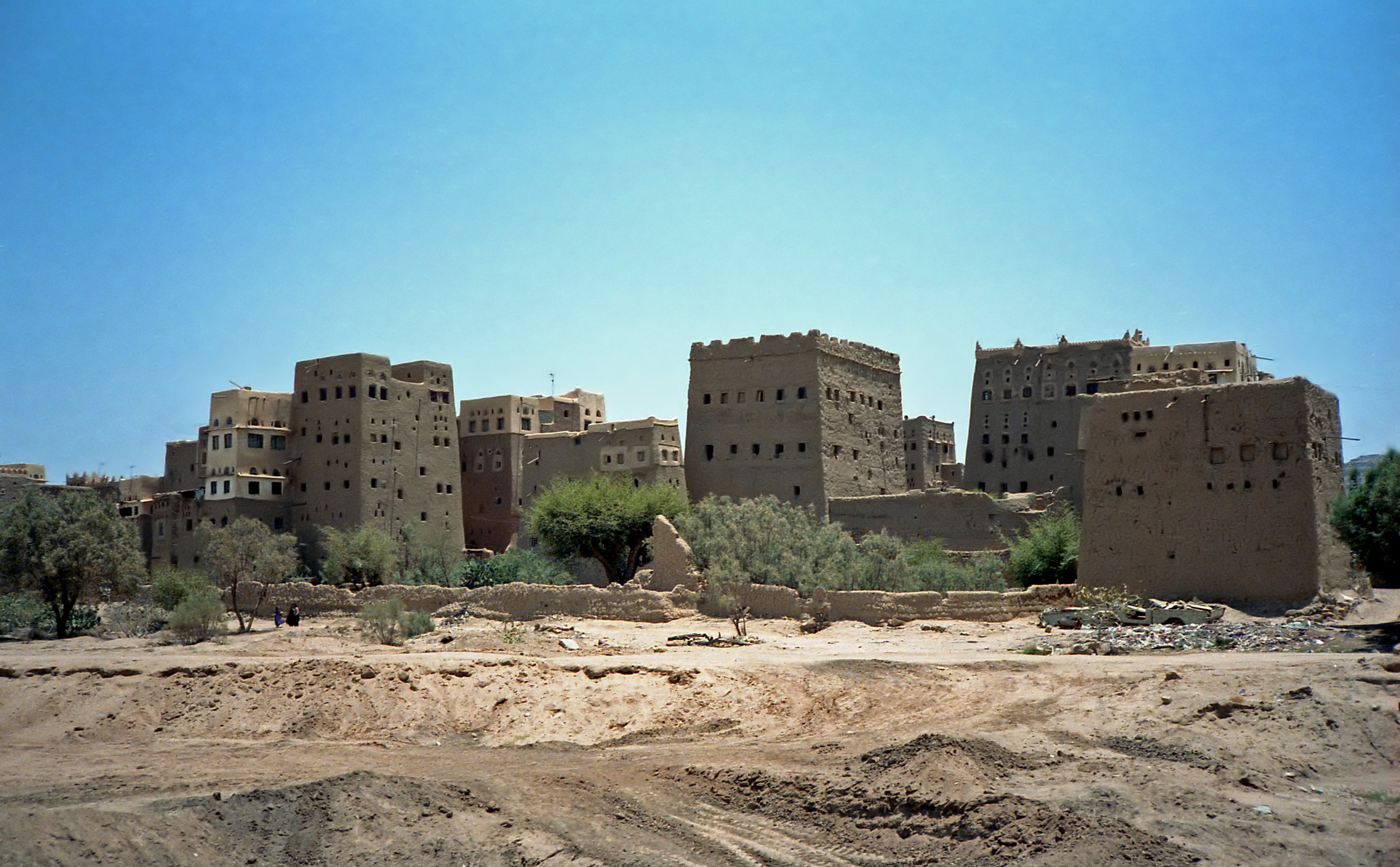
- Buildings in Saada

- Coordinates: 16°58′N 44°43′E
- Country: Yemen
- Region: Azal Region
- Seat: Saada

Government
  - Governor: Hadi Tarshan (in-exile)

Area
  - Total: 11,375 km^{2} (4,392 sq mi)

Population (2025 est.)
  - Total: 1,306,831
  - Density: 114.89/km^{2} (297.55/sq mi)

Saada (Arabic: صَعْدَة, romanized: Ṣaʿdah) or Sa'dah is one of the governorates of Yemen. Located in the northern part of the country, approximately 242 km (150 mi) northwest of the national capital Sanaa, along the border with Saudi Arabia. It covers an area of approximately 11,375 km^{2} (4,392 sq mi) and is subdivided into 15 districts. Its capital is Saada. According to the 2004 population census, it had a population of 695,033, and had an estimated population of 1,306,831 in 2025. It is the epicentre of Zaydism.

== History ==
The historic city of Saada is one of the oldest continuously inhabited settlements in Yemen, with evidence of human occupation dating to prehistoric times. The city was founded in the ninth century CE and subsequently became an important centre during the Islamic period. It is the epicentre of Zaydism. Several Zaydi movements have emerged in Saada Governorate throughout history, the most prominent of which in modern times is the Houthi movement.

== Geography ==
Saada is one of the governorates of Yemen. It is located in the northwestern part of the country, approximately 242 km (150 mi) from the national capital Sana'a. It is bordered by Hajjah and Amran Governorates to the south and Al-Jawf Governorate to the east. It shares land border with Saudi Arabia to the north and west. It occupies an area of approximately 11,375 km^{2} (4,392 sq mi). It has its seat at Saada.

The terrain of the governorate becomes increasingly mountainous and reaches elevations of 2,050 m (6,730 ft) in the far west. Between these mountains and Saada city, the terrain is peppered with basins and wadis, ultimately dropping to form arid plains in the east. Its climate varies according to elevation, with relatively moderate summers and cold winters. Temperatures range between 10 to 26 °C (50 to 79 °F) in summer and 0 to 16 °C (32 to 61 °F) in the winter. Rainfall varies greatly according to location. The western mountains of Razih receive about 100 cm (39 in) of rain annually, while arid regions east of the governorate's capital receives only 5 cm (2.0 in).

== Administration and sub-divisions ==
The governorate is administered by a local council consisting of 15 members and the governor. Saada Governorate is divided into 15 districts.

Districts
District	Size (km²)	Population		
District	Size (km²)	Total	Male	Female
Al Dhaher		42,617	21,678	20,939
Al Hashwah		28,003	14,242	13,761
As Safra		104,422	53,108	51,314
Baqim		29,907	15,212	14,695
Ghamr		38,441	19,551	18,890
Haydan		105,293	53,556	51,737
Kitaf wa Al Boqe'e		52,747	26,829	25,918
Majz		126,630	64,409	62,221
Monabbih		100,405	51,067	49,338
Qatabir		46,211	23,505	22,706
Razih		129,051	65,638	63,413
Sa'adah		128,579	65,397	63,182
Sahar		270,589	137,627	132,962
Saqayn		95,403	48,523	46,880
Shada'a		8,533	4,340	4,193
Total	11,375	1,306,831	664,682	642,149

== Demographics ==
According to the 2004 census, Saada Governorate had a population of 695,033. The population was estimated to be 838,000 in 2011. According to a 2025 estimate, its population was 1,306,831, comprising 664,682 males and 642,149 females.

== Economy ==
Major agricultural products include cereals, vegetables and fruits. The governorate contributed approximately 3.5% of Yemen's total crop production before the civil war. Approximately 136,596 hectares (337,540 acres) of arable land was available in the governorate. Handicrafts and stone quarrying for construction materials are other economic activities in the governorate. Cross-border trade with Saudi Arabia was historically an important commercial activity, although movement has been restricted by the militarisation of the border.

In 2014, central government grants and subsidies accounted for approximately 94% of the governorate's general revenue, while locally generated revenues contributed 6%. The poverty rate was estimated at 84.5% in the same year.
