= 2025 Saada prison airstrike =

US attack in Yemen

- Part of the March–May 2025 United States attacks in Yemen and the Red Sea crisis
- Destroyed facility after the attack

- Location of the facility
- Location: 16.930440°N 43.733537°E; Saada, Saada Governorate, Yemen
- Date: 28 April 2025; 05:00 (UTC+3)
- Target: Saada City Remand Prison
- Attack type: Airstrikes
- Weapon: 3+ GBU-39 bombs
- Deaths: 68
- Injuries: 47
- Victim: African migrants
- Perpetrators: United States; United States Air Force

On 28 April 2025, airstrikes launched by the United States Air Force struck a migrant detention centre operated by the Houthis in the city of Saada in Saada Governorate, Yemen. The attacks left at least 68 detained African migrants dead and 47 others injured. The incident was the largest single death toll for civilians in a U.S. military operation since the 2017 Mosul airstrike.

The detention centre was part of a larger compound that had been operating as a detention facility for years prior to the attack. The prison had received prior visits by representatives from the International Committee of the Red Cross and the United Nations, the latter which denied any military function within the compound. Witnesses and local activists reported at least three airstrikes hitting the detention centre in long succession in the early morning as its inhabitants were sleeping. Another nearby building of unknown use was also hit, though no casualties were reported. Within the wreckage of the prison, the remains of two to three GBU-39 precision-guided bombs were found.

== Background ==
In early 2024, the United States began an airstrike campaign against the Houthis in its controlled territories in Yemen as a response to its attacks on commercial shipping and naval vessels in the Red Sea and the Gulf of Aden in support of Palestine amid the Gaza War. On 15 March 2025, the U.S. launched Operation Rough Rider, an intensification of its ongoing campaign which shifted its main targets from Houthi military infrastructure to striking the group's leadership. The campaign came amid increased efforts to pressure Iran; the main backers of the Houthis, during President Donald Trump's second term. According to the U.S. military, the operation had destroyed "multiple command-and-control facilities, air defense systems, advanced weapons manufacturing facilities and advanced weapons storage locations" of the Houthis. However, watchdog organization Airwars claimed that the shift in strategy had put civilians more at risk to U.S. attacks.

The Saada City Remand Prison had been used as a migrant detention centre for several years prior to the attack. According to The Washington Post, the United Nations has described it as previously including a military barracks and more recently as a detention centre . A Yemen human rights researcher claimed that it ceased serving military purposes for the Houthis in 2015 or 2016, while another researcher, Adnan Al-Gabarni, said it remains an important but mysterious asset for the Houthis and that "the migrants are only a front." A different building in the compound was previously attacked in a Saudi-led coalition airstrike in 2022, killing 91 people. A Saudi military spokesman claimed that the site was being used by the Houthis for military purposes, but a UN report said that its visiting representatives saw no signs that it had a military function.

The compound itself is 50 acres in area and is surrounded by a wall. The two buildings targeted in the compound were about 120 feet long and 500 feet apart, separated by a road. The warehouse-like buildings were similar in design, with corrugated roofs and basic concrete foundations. The facility was in an open area far from any military base.

The detention centre was housing 115 undocumented African migrants at the time of the strike. The detainees were mostly Ethiopians and Somalis, along with other Africans primarily seeking to cross the border into Saudi Arabia. The Houthis claimed that the migrant centre was operating under the supervision of the International Organization for Migration and the International Committee of the Red Cross, though both organizations denied this claim. The Red Cross had however sent representatives to periodically visit the complex since 2018.

== Airstrike ==
On 28 April 2025, shortly before 05:00 local time, the migrant detention centre was hit by several airstrikes launched while its occupants were sleeping. Survivor Abed Ibrahim Saleh said "the planes struck close by twice. The third time they hit us." A local Ethiopian activist said at least three airstrikes directly hit the building in long succession while a fourth one struck near it. The strikes destroyed the facility's ambulance and its main gate, hindering the rescue operation. A second nearby building of unknown use was also targeted in the airstrikes, though no casualties were identified from it.

Former U.S. Army explosives specialist Trevor Ball said that multiple U.S.-made GBU-39 bombs were likely used in the attack and believed that the targets were struck intentionally due to the precision-guided nature of the munitions and the fact that multiple strikes hit the facility. The Washington Post identified at least two GBU-39 fuze wells within the wreckage of the migrant centre. A visual investigation by The New York Times concluded that at least three GBU-39's were used in the attack; two fuze wells and one guidance system part were found at the site.

According to the Houthi-affiliated Al Masirah channel and human rights organization Euro-Mediterranean Human Rights Monitor, the attacks killed at least 68 people and wounded 47 others, all of whom were African migrants. The amount of Somalis killed was "very small" according to a local community leader as a group had been removed from the centre three days earlier. Al-Masirah aired footage of first responders recovering at least a dozen bodies among concrete and metal debris from a large building with partially destroyed walls and no roof. The Red Cross supported the Yemen Red Crescent Society in the emergency response to the attack. A United Nations official stated later in the day that "two nearby hospitals have already received more than 50 injured people, many of them critically wounded." The Washington Post analysed footage released by the Houthis showing the aftermath of the attack. They identified at least 38 people killed and 32 people wounded from the footage. They noted that this was almost certainly an undercount and were unable to discern if the victims were all civilians but also noted that no military equipment was visible in the footage. The New York Times said it was unable to independently confirm that all the casualties in the attack were migrants. An Amnesty International report stated that all casualties in the attack were civilians.

== Reactions ==
Avatar of U.S. Central Command

U.S. Central Command
(@CENTCOM)
tweeted:

To preserve operational security, we have intentionally limited disclosing details of our ongoing or future operations. We are very deliberate in our operational approach, but will not reveal specifics about what we’ve done or what we will do.

27 Apr 2025

A statement by the U.S. Central Command earlier in the day before the strike justified its withholding of details relating to its operations in Yemen. Later in the day, after the airstrike was reported by local media, a U.S. Department of Defense official said that CENTCOM was "aware of the claims of civilian casualties related to the U.S. strikes in Yemen, and we take those claims very seriously." It was added that "we are currently conducting our battle-damage assessment and inquiry into those claims."

Houthi spokesperson Mohammed Abdulsalam called the attack a "brutal crime" in a statement on X. The Sanaa-based Yemeni Ministry of Interior released a statement condemning what it called a "heinous crime committed by U.S. aggression."

UN spokesman Stéphane Dujarric labeled the attack "deeply alarming" and urged all parties to protect civilians, without mentioning the U.S. military. The sentiment was repeated by the UN Special Envoy for Yemen Hans Grundberg, who called for "accountability for every loss of civilian life." Christine Cipolla, head of the Red Cross delegation in Yemen, said that "It is unthinkable that while people are detained and have nowhere to escape, they can also be caught in the line of fire."

Amnesty International described the strike as a violation of international humanitarian law and a possible war crime and called for the Pentagon to provide reparations to victims.

== See also ==
- Civilian casualties from U.S. drone strikes
- 2025 Ras Isa oil terminal airstrikes
- 2017 al-Jinah airstrike
- 2019 U.S. airstrike in Baghuz
- List of massacres in Yemen
- United States war crimes
