= Timeline of the Gaza war (18 March 2025 – 15 May 2025) =

- Initial attacks; (7–27 October 2023); Invasion of the Gaza Strip; (28 October 2023 – 23 November 2023); First ceasefire; (24 November 2023 – 11 January 2024); Yemen airstrikes; (12 January 2024 – 6 May 2024); Rafah offensive; (7 May 2024 – 12 July 2024); Al-Mawasi attack; (13 July 2024 – 26 September 2024); Attack on Hezbollah headquarters; (27 September 2024 – 16 October 2024); Killing of Yahya Sinwar; (17 October 2024 – 26 November 2024); Israel–Lebanon ceasefire agreement; (27 November 2024 – 18 January 2025); Israel–Hamas ceasefire agreement; (19 January 2025 – 17 March 2025); March 2025 Israeli attacks on the Gaza Strip; (18 March 2025 – 15 May 2025); May 2025 Gaza offensive; (16 May 2025 – 19 August 2025); August 2025 Gaza offensive; (20 August 2025 – 2 October 2025); October 2025 Israel–Hamas ceasefire agreement; (3 October 2025 – present)

== March ==
=== 18 March ===
- Israel said that it is conducting "extensive strikes" on Hamas and PIJ targets throughout Gaza including groups of militants, rocket-launching positions, weapons, and other military infrastructure. Over 404 people including 263 women and children were killed, according to the Gaza Health Ministry. One of those strikes hit a house in Rafah, killing 17 family members, including at least 12 women and children. Another strike hit a residential block in Gaza City, killing 27 relatives, including women and children. Six officials from the Hamas government were killed during overnight Israeli strikes in Gaza. Reportedly the PIJ spokesperson Abu Hamza was also killed while another airstrike in Khan Yunis killed a senior member of PIJ.
- Israeli media reported that Israel Katz ordered to close the Rafah crossing for patients in Gaza.
- The IDF ordered Gazans to evacuate from areas in Gaza's outskirts including Beit Hanoun, Khuza'a, and Abasan al-Kabira to "known shelters" in western Gaza City and Khan Yunis.
- The IDF said that Arrow air defense systems shot down a ballistic missile launched by Houthis above Saudi Arabia. The Houthis said that it targeted Nevatim Airbase using a Palestine-2 missile.
- Israeli police said that it killed a Palestinian militant, wounded four others and detained two wanted men for questioning during an arrest operation in Qalqilya after they opened fire.
- The IDF said that it detained three suspects and seized weapons during its operation in Nablus.
- Houthi's Saba news agency and Al-Masirah reported a US strike in Saada while Agence France Presse reported three strikes in the same city.

=== 19 March ===
- The Gaza Health Ministry reported that 436 people were killed in Israeli attacks since 18 March, increasing its count of the Palestinian death toll in Gaza to 49,547. (Note: Casualty count includes both militants and civilians. For further information see Casualties of the Gaza war § Civilian to combatant ratio.)
- Al Jazeera Arabic reported that a woman and her child were killed and several others were wounded in an Israeli airstrike which hit a tent west of Khan Yunis.
- Houthi media reported at least 10 US strikes in Yemen, including in Saada and Hodeidah.
- The Houthis said that it targeted the USS Harry S. Truman and other vessels in the US carrier group with "a number of cruise missiles and drones" and thwarted a planned US attack in Yemen.
- Wafa reported that crops were vandalized by Israeli settlers who released their livestock in a village in Masafer Yatta.
- Wafa reported that one Palestinian man was killed during an undercover raid by Israeli special forces in al-Ein refugee camp in Nablus. It also reported that three Palestinians were wounded in clashes with Israeli forces who apprehended several people.
- The IAF said that its overnight strikes hit approximately 20 targets, including a Hamas military site in north Gaza "where preparations were being made to fire projectiles at Israeli territory". The IDF said that the Israeli Navy struck several vessels used by Hamas and PIJ for militant activities in the coastal area of Gaza.
- The IDF renewed evacuation orders for residents of Beit Hanoun, Khuza'a, Abasan al-Kabira and Abasan al-Jadida to move to shelters in western Gaza City or Khan Yunis.
- Al Jazeera reported that an Israeli artillery strike in Abasan al-Jadida, injured a group of Palestinians.
- The Gaza Health Ministry said that an Israeli strike hit the UN headquarters in Deir al-Balah killed at least one foreign UN staff and critically wounded five others. The IDF denied conducting the strike. The UN confirmed the death of one of its staff and injuries to others and added that the circumstances of the incident was unclear. The Bulgarian foreign ministry said that the fatality was Bulgarian. UN started a probe regarding the incident.
- Gaza Civil Defense said that one of its members was killed in an Israeli strike in Gaza City.
- Malaysia said that it will accept 15 deported Palestinian prisoners.
- The IDF said it targeted the main command center of Daraj-Tuffah Battalion of Hamas, in Gaza City in overnight strikes.
- The IDF and Shin Bet said that it killed two Hamas officials in Gaza in the past day.
- The IDF said that it started "pinpoint" ground operations in the central and south Gaza, saying that it is aimed at expanding its buffer zone.
- Wafa reported that an Israeli drone strike in Asdaa City, west of Khan Yunis, killed a two-year-old boy.
- Al-Masirah reported US strikes in Sanaa, Saada and Al-Sawadiya, southeast of Sanaa.
- The IDF said its airstrikes struck Hamas and PIJ targets in Gaza including a vehicle in south Gaza with two militants in it, several other militants, infrastructure, and observation posts.
- A Gaza medic told Al Jazeera that an Israeli strike hit a vehicle in Rafah, killing at least five civilians.
- Wafa reported that over 80 Palestinian families were displaced in al-Ein refugee camp, in the vicinity of Nablus after Israeli forces turned buildings into military barracks.
- Wafa reported that two Palestinians including a 16-year-old teenager were injured by Israeli gunfire in Madama, Nablus and Beit Furik.
- Demolition orders were issued for 66 buildings in Jenin refugee camp by Israeli authorities.

=== 20 March ===
- The Gaza Health Ministry reported that 506 people were killed in Israeli attacks since 18 March, increasing its count of the Palestinian death toll in Gaza to 49,617.
- Al Masirah reported that the US military conducted five strikes in Al Hudaydah Governorate, hitting a cotton processing plant in Zabid.
- Yemen's Houthi-run health ministry said that a US airstrike hit a wedding hall which was under construction in Sanaa, injuring nine people, including women and children.
- Al Jazeera reported that at least 71 Palestinians including women and children were killed in Israeli pre-dawn attacks on the Gaza Strip.
- Al Jazeera Arabic and Quds News Network reported that Israeli shelling in south Gaza killed at least 20 people. According to the Gaza Health Ministry, the dead included children.
- The Houthis said that they hit Ben Gurion Airport using a Palestine-2 hypersonic ballistic missile. The IDF said that it intercepted the missile before it entered Israeli airspace.
- Al Jazeera reported that Israeli forces rearrested two Palestinian prisoners from Hebron.
- Arabic-language IDF spokesman Avichay Adraee warned Gazans to avoid travelling on the Salah al-Din Road.
- UNRWA chief Philippe Lazzarini said that five of their staff members were killed in Gaza in the last few days.
- The IDF said that it started ground operations along the coast of north Gaza, near Beit Lahia. It also said that it conducted airstrikes on approximately 40 targets in Beit Lahia including tunnels, anti-tank missile launch posts, Hamas militants and other threats to soldiers. The IDF and Shin Bet said that they conducted overnight strikes on dozens of Hamas and PIJ targets including militants, weapons and other infrastructure that threatened Israel.
- The IDF said that three long-range rockets were fired from south Gaza towards central Israel, of which one was intercepted while the others fell in open areas. al-Qassam Brigades said that it launched a barrage of M90 rockets. The IDF issued evacuation orders for civilians in the launch area in Bani Suheila.
- The IDF and Shin Bet said that they killed two Hamas officials in airstrikes in Gaza, while another strike killed a prominent PIJ militant who "led most of the weapon smuggling efforts for the PIJ in recent years."
- Gaza's European Hospital said that an Israeli strike hit a house in Abasan al-Kabira, killing at least 16 people, mostly women and children.
- The IDF said that it shot down a ballistic missile fired by the Houthis prior to entering Israel. The Houthis said that it targeted an IDF site south of Jaffa.
- Al Masirah said that at least four US airstrikes hit Al Mina district.
- The IDF said that it started a ground operation in Rafah and destroyed militant infrastructure in Shaboura camp and a Hamas command center in north Gaza. It added that it conducted airstrikes throughout Gaza, targeting Hamas and PIJ sites in the last few hours.
- NNA reported Israeli airstrikes on an area between Jbaa, Zhalta, and Snaya in the vicinity of Jezzine in south Lebanon and in Janta. The IDF said that it conducted airstrikes on two Hezbollah facilities in Beqaa Valley after identifying one of its underground infrastructure and another site used for storing rocket launchers.
- Hamas says it launched three rockets at Tel Aviv.
- Israel says Hamas is still holding 59 hostages, 24 of whom are believed to still be alive.

=== 21 March ===
- Yemeni media reported that US fighter jets conducted six air strikes in At Tuhayta district.
- The IDF said that a Palestinian militant shot and critically injured a reservist during an overnight operation in Nablus.
- An Israeli strike completely destroyed the Turkish-Palestinian Friendship Hospital. The IDF said that it conducted an airstrike on a Hamas cell residing at the hospital and added that it was not used for medical purposes for more than a year.
- The IDF said that air defences intercepted two rockets launched from north Gaza towards Ashkelon. The al-Qassam Brigades said that it launched a barrage of rockets towards Ashkelon. Later, it issued an evacuation order for an area in north Gaza, saying that rockets were fired from there. The IDF later said that it struck the rocket launcher used in the attack.
- Médecins Sans Frontières said that one of its staff was killed when an Israeli strike hit his apartment building in Deir al-Balah.
- Al Jazeera reported that an Israeli strike hit the medical faculty of the Islamic University of Gaza.
- The IDF and Shin Bet said that they killed Hamas military intelligence chief in south Gaza in an airstrike one day prior.
- The IDF said that air defences intercepted a ballistic missile fired towards Israel by the Houthis prior to entering Israel. The Houthis said that they launched a ballistic missile at Ben Gurion Airport and fired drones towards US warships in the Red Sea.

=== 22 March ===
- The Gaza Health Ministry reported that 634 people were killed in Israeli attacks since 18 March, increasing its count of the Palestinian death toll in Gaza to 49,747.
- Al Jazeera reported that an overnight Israeli strike hit Gaza City, killing five children and trapping at least eight members from the same family under the rubble.
- The IDF told residents of Muqata'a neighbourhood of Tulkarem to evacuate.
- The Jenin Brigades said it detonated an explosive device at the Salem IDF checkpoint in Silat al-Harithiya.
- The IDF said that it intercepted three rockets launched from Lebanon towards Metula. It also said that at six rockets were fired and three of those rockets apparently fell short in Lebanon. The Lebanese Army said that it located and dismantled three rocket launchers used to fire rockets. NNA reported, citing Lebanese Public Health Emergency Operations Center that at least five people including a girl were killed and 10 others, including two children were wounded in an Israeli airstrike in Touline. The IDF said that it targeted dozens of Hezbollah rocket launchers and a command center used by the group as a response to rocket fire. Hezbollah denied responsibility for the attack, prompting both the IDF and the Lebanese Army to open an investigation. Later, Netanyahu and Israeli Defense Minister Israel Katz instructed the IDF to conduct a second series of airstrikes targeting Hezbollah. The Lebanese Health Ministry said that at least one man was killed and in an Israeli strike in Tyre, while another strike in Al-Qlailah killed one person. It also said 40 people were wounded. Later, a 60-year-old man and a young women died from injuries sustained from the strikes.
- Al Jazeera reported that an Israeli strike hit al-Shimaa, in the vicinity of Beit Lahia, killing at least three people, including a child, and injuring five others.
- A defense official said that a ballistic missile fired from Yemen, apparently aimed towards Israel, fell short in Saudi Arabia.
- Saba News Agency reported that the US conducted three strikes on Hodeida International Airport.

=== 23 March ===
- The Gaza Health Ministry reported that 41 Palestinians were killed in Israeli attacks in the past 24 hours, increasing its count of the Palestinian death toll in Gaza to 50,021.
- Hamas officials said that an Israeli strike in Khan Yunis killed Hamas political leader Salah al-Bardawil and his wife.
- Saba News Agency reported a US attack on the Port of Salif.
- Wafa reported that Israeli forces displaced dozens of families from their houses in eastern Tulkarm and seized several buildings for use as barracks during their ongoing raid on the area.
- Saba news agency reported US bombings in Sahar district and Kitaf wa Al Boqe'e district. It also reported that the US conducted five air attacks in Marib Governorate.
- The IDF said that air defences intercepted a ballistic missile fired towards Israel by the Houthis before entering the country. Magen David Adom said that two motorcyclists were wounded in collisions during the sirens triggered by the missile. The Houthis said that they launched a Palestine-2 ballistic missile at Ben Gurion Airport and targeted the USS Harry S. Truman in the Red Sea using "several missiles and drones".
- Israeli Defence Minister Israel Katz's office said that the Israeli security cabinet approved a new directorate to enable Gaza residents to make their "voluntary" departure from Gaza to a third state.
- March 2025 Rafah humanitarian convoy attacks: The PRCS said that Israeli forces besieged several Palestine Red Crescent ambulances while responding to an attack in Rafah's Al-Hashashin area. It later said that the fate of rescue workers is still unknown after some 15 hours. The IDF claimed that at least six of those killed were Hamas militants.
- The IDF issued an "urgent" warning for Gazans to evacuate Tel al-Sultan refugee camp. It later said that it completely encircled the area, killed several militants and raided a Hamas command and control complex.
- NNA reported that an Israeli drone struck a car in Ayta ash Shab. Al Jazeera reported that it killed a Hezbollah commander while the IDF said that it killed a Hezbollah militant.
- Israeli security forces said that they thwarted an attempt to smuggle weapons in the West Bank.
- Israeli police and Shin Bet said that they arrested a 65-year-old man from Netivot accused of spying for Iran.
- The IDF and Shin Bet said that they killed a Hamas battalion chief and a Hamas deputy commander in recent airstrikes in Gaza.
- An Israeli strike hit a surgical building inside the Nasser Hospital, killing Ismail Barhoum, a Hamas political bureau member "while receiving treatment" and a 16-year-old Palestinian boy and injuring eight others. Israeli Defence Minister Israel Katz said that Barhoum was prime minister in the Hamas government in Gaza who replaced Issam al-Da'alis, the previous prime minister who was assassinated a few days prior. An American trauma surgeon volunteering at the hospital said that the male surgery department was destroyed in the strike.
- A 17-year-old Palestinian boy, Walid Ahmed from the West Bank town of Silwad died in Israeli custody in Megiddo Prison.
- An Israeli airstrike on a house in Gaza killed Jihad al-Agha, Hamas government's head of the supervision department at the East Khan Younis Education Directorate and his wife, child and three daughters.

=== 24 March ===
- The Gaza Health Ministry reported that 61 Palestinians were killed in Israeli attacks in the past 24 hours, increasing its count of the Palestinian death toll in Gaza to 50,082.
- Al Jazeera reported that an Israeli strike hit Nuseirat refugee camp, killing two women.
- Yemen's Houthi Health Ministry said that one person was killed and 13 others were wounded including three children in a US strike on a residential building in the Aser area of Sanaa.
- Al Jazeera reported that Israeli shelling hit five civilian cars in Gaza City, injuring six people.
- Saudi media outlet AlHadath reported that a high-level Houthi official was killed in overnight US airstrikes in Sanaa.
- An elderly Israeli man was killed and a soldier was wounded in a shooting, stabbing and ramming attack in the vicinity of Yokneam Illit. The attacker was killed at the scene.
- Al Jazeera reported that Israeli forces opened fire while advancing on the al-Mawasi camp, an Israeli designated humanitarian zone for civilians.
- An Israeli strike hit a tent sheltering for displaced people in a school in Nuseirat refugee camp, killing three Palestinians including a child and injured at least 18 others. Another strike hit Maen, Khan Yunis, killing a child and injuring others.
- An Israeli strike hit a home in Khan Yunis, killing Palestinian journalist Mohammed Mansour who worked for TV channel Palestine Today. The IDF labelled him as a militant.
- An Israeli strike hit a car in eastern Beit Lahia, killing an Al Jazeera Mubasher journalist Hossam Shabat, who was previously injured in an Israeli strike. The IDF said that he was a Hamas sniper, which Al Jazeera and Shabat previously denied.
- The International Red Cross and Red Crescent Movement said that an "explosive projectile" damaged its office in Rafah. The IDF confirmed that it accidentally opened fire on the building.
- The IDF said that it intercepted two rockets fired from the Gaza towards south Israel. The PIJ claimed responsibility. The IDF later issued evacuation orders for Palestinians in Beit Lahia, Beit Hanoun and Jabalia, saying that projectiles were launched from there.
- The IDF said that it arrested approximately 30 suspects during operations in Tel al-Sultan refugee camp, including a militant who participated in the 7 October attacks. It also said that it killed approximately 20 militants, including in airstrikes, and raided a Hamas command center.
- Dozens of Israeli settlers attacked Palestinians in Susya, injuring four Palestinians. Israeli police arrested three Palestinians including Hamdan Ballal, one of the co-directors of Oscar-winning film No Other Land and an Israeli minor. Per Israeli police, Palestinians threw stones in response.
- NNA, citing the Lebanese Health Ministry, reported that an Israeli drone strike on a vehicle in Qaaqaait al-Jisr killed one person. The IDF said that it killed a Hezbollah antitank unit commander in a strike in Nabatieh District.
- The IDF said that it downed a ballistic missile fired at Israel by the Houthis. The Houthis said that they launched two ballistic missiles at Ben Gurion airport, including “a Palestine 2 hypersonic ballistic missile”, as well as several missiles and drones towards the USS Harry Truman and other US warships.
- An Israeli strike in Khan Yunis killed several people including Manar Abu Khater, the Hamas government's Eastern Khan Yunis education directorate's education director and his two sons.

=== 25 March ===
- The Gaza Health Ministry reported that 62 Palestinians were killed in Israeli attacks in the past 24 hours, increasing its count of the Palestinian death toll in Gaza to 50,144.
- Six people were killed in an Israeli airstrike in the town of Koya, near Daraa, southern Syria. The IDF said that it returned fire and a drone conducted a strike against armed men who opened fire against it.
- Saba News Agency reported that US air strikes in the outskirts of Saada injured at least two people.
- Al Jazeera reported that an Israeli strike hit eastern Khan Yunis, killing two children.
- Al Jazeera reported that five people including three children were killed in Israeli strikes on their tents in Hamad City.
- Al Jazeera reported that an Israeli strike in central Gaza killed three people, including two women.
- Al Jazeera reported that sn Israeli strike hit northern Beit Lahia, killing three people including a three-year-old girl and injuring 10 others.
- Saba News Agency reported that a US strike destroyed a cancer hospital in Saada Governorate.
- Israeli police said that they shot a Palestinian man who attempted to ram his car against a police officer during an inspection in Mishor Adumim in the vicinity of Ma'ale Adumim.
- The IDF, Shin Bet and Israeli police said that they killed three militants during an overnight raid in Qalqilya, including one planning an imminent attack, and recovered a home-made machine gun.
- The IDF estimated that it killed more than 150 Hamas militants and members of other militant groups since it renewed its operation in Gaza.
- NNA reported that Israeli forces fired military flares towards Lebanese villages on the border's western sector. Lebanese media outlets reported that an Israeli drone dropped stun grenades in the vicinity of a mosque in Mais al-Jabal.
- Al-Masirah reported that two US air attacks targeted the Sahar district. It later reported three more US air attacks in the same area.
- Hundreds of Gazans took to the streets across the Gaza Strip to protest against Hamas, chanting for the overthrow of its rule and an end to the war. This was the largest protest by Gazans against Hamas since the beginning of the war.

=== 26 March ===
- The Gaza Health Ministry reported that 39 Palestinians were killed in Israeli attacks in the past 24 hours, increasing its count of the Palestinian death toll in Gaza to 50,183.
- An Israeli strike hit a home in Jabalia, killing at least eight people, injuring several others and trapped several others under the rubble. The victims of the attack include a woman and her children including a 6-month-old boy.
- An Israeli strike hit a residential apartment in Bureij, killing a child and injuring several people.
- An Israeli drone strike hit the center of Khan Yunis, killing two people including a woman and injuring another person.
- The Houthis claimed that they launched attacks targeting US warships in the Red Sea, including the USS Harry Truman, and drones at IDF sites in Tel Aviv.
- Al-Masirah reported US strikes in Saada, Al Salem district in Saada Governorate and Harf Sufyan district.
- Wafa reported that medics were beaten by Israeli forces in Fawwar, Hebron.
- The Yemen Data Project found that at least 25 civilians, including four children, were killed and at least 28 civilians were wounded in US strikes in Yemen.
- The IDF said that it arrested 20 suspected militants in raids throughout the West Bank.
- The IDF said that that air defences intercepted a rocket fired from central Gaza towards southern Israel, while another rocket landed outside Zimrat. PIJ claimed responsibility. The IDF issued evacuation orders for Palestinians in Gaza City including in Zaytun, Tel al-Hawa, and Sheikh Ijlin neighborhoods of Gaza City, saying that rockets were fired from these areas. The IDF later said that it struck a militant responsible for launching the rockets.
- Channel 14 reported that Israeli forces demolished 24 greenhouses belonging to Palestinians in Tulkarm Governorate in the vicinity of Bat Hefer, saying that they threatened Israel.
- Israeli drones hit tents sheltering for displaced people and a charity food bank in central Gaza, killing 11 Palestinians.
- An Israeli strike hit a group of people and a makeshift tent in Az-Zawayda, killing two women and seriously injuring at least four others.
- The IDF said that IAF struck more than 430 targets in Gaza in the past week. The IAF said that it struck another 40 Hezbollah targets in Lebanon in the same time.
- The IDF said that it intercepted a long-range rocket fired from north Gaza towards south Israel above Israeli airspace. PIJ said that it targeted Hatzerim Airbase. The IDF later warned Palestinians in Gaza City area to evacuate, saying that rockets were launched from the area.
- The IDF said that its drone strike in Derdghaya killed Ahmed Adnan Bajija, a battalion commander of Radwan Force of Hezbollah whom it accused of violating the ceasefire.
- Al-Masirah reported US strikes in Sanaa.
- The IDF said that it killed a masked Palestinian suspect who intended to throw a rock towards Israeli motorists along Highway 60 in the West Bank.

=== 27 March ===
- The Gaza Health Ministry reported that 25 Palestinians were killed in Israeli attacks in the past 24 hours, increasing its count of the Palestinian death toll in Gaza to 50,208.
- Al Jazeera said that an Israeli strike hit people living in makeshift shelters in the Israeli-designated safe zone of al-Mawasi in Khan Yunis, killing one person and injuring several others.
- Al Masirah reported that four US attacks hit a stone quarry in the al-Arqoub area in Khawlan district, killing at least two people and injuring two others.
- Al Jazeera said that an Israeli airstrike on a tent in Jabalia killed Hamas spokesman Abdel-Latif al-Qanoua and injured several others including children. Another Israeli strike hit a tent in Khan Yunis, injuring several children.
- Wafa reported that Israeli forces shot and wounded four teenagers during two raids in the West Bank.
- Al Masirah reported that US strikes hit Sahlain and al-Salem areas of Saada Governorate.
- NNA reported that Israeli artillery launched six shells towards al-Dabash neighbourhood in Yohmor al-Shaqif in Nabatieh Governorate, coinciding with an Israeli drone strike on a car. The IDF said that it conducted an airstrike on a Hezbollah cell moving weapons in the area. NNA reported that the strike killed at least three people.
- Al Jazeera said that Israeli forces shot and killed a disabled Palestinian man in Zaytun Quarter. Another Israeli air strike hit a home in Abasan al-Kabira, killing a child and injuring at least four people.
- The IDF said that it intercepted two missiles launched from Yemen prior to entering Israel. The Houthis said that they targeted Ben Gurion Airport, an IDF facility in Tel Aviv, and the USS Harry Truman.
- The IDF said that it uncovered a multiple rocket launcher with 25 barrels and several artillery shells at a Hamas facility in Tel al-Sultan refugee camp.
- Al Jazeera said that an Israeli strike hit a market in Gaza City, killing seven Palestinians and injuring several people including civilians.
- The Lebanese Health Ministry said that an Israeli strike in Baraachit killed two people. The IDF said that it conducted a drone strike on two Hezbollah militants in the area.
- Al Jazeera said that an Israeli strike hit a tent in Beit Lahia, killing a Palestinian paramedic.
- World Central Kitchen said that Israeli strikes in the vicinity of one of its aid facilities in Gaza killed one of its volunteers and injured six others.
- The United States Department of Justice said that it seized Hamas cryptocurrency.
- Wafa said that Israeli forces denied Palestinians full access to the Cave of the Patriarchs for the fourth day.

=== 28 March ===
- The Gaza Health Ministry reported that 43 Palestinians were killed in Israeli attacks in the past 24 hours, increasing its count of the Palestinian death toll in Gaza to 50,251.
- Houthi media reported that US airstrikes hit over 40 locations throughout areas controlled by Houthis in Yemen, including neighborhoods in Sanaa, injuring at least seven people. It also reported that targeted areas included places where many of the Houthi leadership reside.
- Al Jazeera said that an Israeli strike hit a residential house in Zaytun Quarter of Gaza City, killing eight people, mostly women and children, seriously injuring nearly 20 others including women and children and trapping four others under the rubble. It also said that another strike in eastern Khan Yunis killed two people including a woman.
- The IDF said that two rockets were launched towards north Israel from Lebanon, one of which was intercepted while the other landed inside Lebanese territory. Hezbollah denied launching the rockets. The IDF issued evacuation orders for a building in Hadath, Mount Lebanon, saying that it is a Hezbollah facility. Lebanese media outlets later reported an Israeli airstrike in Beirut. The IDF later said that it struck a facility used by Hezbollah for storing drones. The Lebanese Health Ministry said that an Israeli airstrike in Kfar Tebnit killed one person and wounded eight, including three children, and a strike in Beit Yahoun injured two people. Al Jazeera reported that another Israeli strike in Yohmor River road in south Lebanon killed two Syrian workers. The Lebanese Army said that it found the rocket launcher used to launch the projectiles and launched a probe to find which group was responsible for the incident. The IDF said that the IAF targeted 15 Hezbollah targets in Lebanon in response.
- The IDF and Israeli police said that they arrested a Palestinian suspect from Tulkarm who opened fire on an IDF vehicle and wounded a soldier in November 2023.
- Al Jazeera reported that injuries were caused by an Israeli settler attack on shepherds in Khirbet Janba in Masafer Yatta. Wafa reported that five Palestinians were wounded in the attack. It also reported that settlers also attacked and deployed between Qabalan and Jurish with the protection of Israeli forces.
- A Gaza Civil Defense officer's body was recovered from Tel al-Sultan refugee camp.
- The Times of Israel reported that two Israeli shepherds were assaulted with clubs and stones in the West Bank, after which Israeli settlers confronted Palestinian shepherds and wounded three, including a 15-year-old. Twenty-two Palestinians were arrested by the IDF.
- The IDF said that IAF conducted more than 25 strikes in Gaza, targeting militants and infrastructure belonging to Hamas and other militant groups.
- Wafa reported that two people were shot and injured and a woman suffered tear gas inhalation during an Israeli raid in Beit Ummar. Israeli forces detained a 67-year-old man while passing through Qalandia checkpoint.
- Hamas executed six men, who allegedly were spying for Israel and planned the elimination of senior Hamas figure Isma’il Barhoum, and were involved in targeting Hamas political bureau member and strategic planner Salah al-Bardawil.

=== 29 March ===
- The Gaza Health Ministry reported that 25 Palestinians were killed in Israeli attacks in the past 24 hours, increasing its count of the Palestinian death toll in Gaza to 50,277.
- Al Masirah reported that the US conducted strikes 72 times on various areas of Yemen, killing one person and injuring four others. United States Central Command said that it struck "Houthi positions".
- The Palestine Red Crescent Society said that two people, including an 18-year-old girl, were beaten by Israeli forces in their house in the at-Taawon neighbourhood of Nablus.
- The Palestine Red Crescent Society said that it found the body of the mission leader of a rescue team which went missing one week prior in Tel al-Sultan refugee camp. The IDF said that it mistakenly opened fire while targeting Hamas and PIJ militants.
- Al Jazeera reported that an Israeli strike hit tents in Qizan an-Najjar, killing five people including a girl and a woman.
- The Tulkarm Media Committee said that over 4,000 families were displaced during Israeli offensives in Tulkarm Camp and Nur Shams.
- The IDF said that three mortars were fired on its soldiers on the outskirts of Khan Yunis, adding that one of its armoured vehicles drove over an explosive device, without causing casualties. The PIJ claimed responsibility. The IDF issued evacuation warnings for Palestinians on the outskirts of Khan Yunis including Khirbet Khuza’a, Abasan al-Kabira and al-Qarara. It later said that it struck the mortar launching site.
- Wafa reported that an Israeli strike hit a tent sheltering displaced families inside the Social Security and Pension Authority compound, west of Gaza City, killing three women and injuring three others.
- The IDF said that it opened fire on suspicious vehicles in Tel al-Sultan refugee camp, killing several Hamas and PIJ militants.
- NNA reported that Israeli forces opened fire towards eastern neighbourhoods in Kfar Shouba, Hasbaya, damaging houses and cars.
- Lebanese media reported that Israeli forces opened fire towards a French infantry unit serving in UNIFIL while inspecting a dirt mound put up by Israeli forces in Rmaish.
- The IDF said that it started a ground offensive in Rafah's al-Jnaina neighborhood.
- Al Jazeera said that an Israeli strike hit people breaking their Ramadan fast on a beach in Deir el-Balah, killing three Palestinians including civilians.
- Palestinian media reported that dozens of settlers and soldiers destroyed houses and equipment during their raid in Jinba.
- The IDF and Shin Bet said that they recovered items belonging to Israeli civilian hostage Manny Godard, saying that he was killed by PIJ militants during the 7 October attacks and had his body taken to Gaza.

=== 30 March ===
- Houthi media reported that US airstrikes hit Saada, Saada Governorate, Sanaa, Sanaa Governorate and Al-Salem district.
- Al Jazeera said that at least 65 Palestinians, including at least 10 children were killed in separate Israeli strikes in Gaza.
- Houthis said that they targeted US warships, led by the USS Harry Truman three times in the Red Sea in the last 24 hours.
- Al Jazeera said that A 22-year-old Palestinian man was shot dead by undercover Israeli forces in a raid in Tammun, West Bank.
- Wafa reported that Israeli forces arrested three people including a 16-year-old from Hebron.
- The IDF said that air defences downed a ballistic missile fired by the Houthis prior to entering Israel. Magen David Adom said that a 42-year-old women died in a fall while she sought shelter.
- Al Jazeera said that an Israeli strike hit a tent camp in the Israeli-designated humanitarian safe zone in al-Mawasi, killing four people including three children.
- Netanyahu's office said that the Israeli security cabinet approved a plan to construct roads which will redirect and separate Israeli and Palestinian traffic in the West Bank, allowing Palestinians to bypass Israeli checkpoints.
- The Lebanese General Security agency said that it detained a number of suspects accused of launching projectiles towards Israel.
- The PRCS said that it found the bodies of 14 missing rescuers killed by Israeli attacks.
- Al Jazeera said that an Israeli strike hit a home in Tuffah, killing seven Palestinians including three children and injuring several others.
- Israeli Defence Minister Israel Katz appointed Yaakov Blitstein as head of the Gaza "voluntary" relocation directorate.
- Al Jazeera said that an Israel strike hit a hit a residential building in Hamad City, killing nine people including women and children.

=== 31 March ===
- The Gaza Health Ministry reported that 80 Palestinians were killed in Israeli attacks in the past 48 hours, increasing its count of the Palestinian death toll in Gaza to 50,357.
- The Houthi-run Health Ministry said that US strikes which started on 15 March killed 59 people and injured 136 others. It also said that those killed include women and children.
- Al Masirah reported that the US conducted four strikes on Jadr area in the Bani Al Harith district, killing at least one person and injuring at least five others.
- The IDF issued evacuation orders for the majority of residents of Rafah Governorate to move to Al-Mawasi due to operations against militants.
- Wafa reported that two Palestinians including a former prisoner were arrested in Tulkarm while five young men were detained at a checkpoint east of the area, of which two were beaten and freed.
- The Palestinian Information Center and Al Jazeera reported that an Israeli strike hit a group of people in Al-Musaddar, killing three farmers.
- Al Jazeera reported that an Israeli strike hit a tent sheltering displaced people in the Israeli-designated safe zone of al-Mawasi, killing two people and injuring others.
- Al Masirah reported citing the Yemeni Health Ministry that US strikes hit the Bani Qais area, killing two people and injuring a child.
- Al Jazeera reported that an Israeli strike hit a residential home in Khan Yunis, killing six people including two children and injuring several others.
- The Shin Bet said that it thwarted a gun and bomb attack planned by Hamas militants in Turkey.
- The IDF said that it destroyed a tunnel measuring at least one kilometer long in north Gaza, and killed over 50 Palestinian militants in north Gaza and central Gaza. It also said that it found a rocket-producing facility and several launchers.
- Al Jazeera reported that an Israeli strike hit a residential house in Yaffa Street of Gaza City, killing 12 people including women and children and wounding others.
- The al-Qassam Brigades claimed that it blew up an Israeli tank using “a pre-prepared explosive device" east of Khan Yunis and shelled the area using mortars.
- The IDF said that it punished several officers and troops for vandalizing property belonging to Palestinians in Masafer Yatta's Jinba.
- Al Masirah reported two US strikes on Kamaran.
- Houthis claimed that air defences shot down a US General Atomics MQ-9 Reaper above Marib Governorate.

== April ==
=== 1 April ===
- The Gaza Health Ministry reported that 42 Palestinians were killed in Israeli attacks in the past 24 hours, increasing its count of the Palestinian death toll in Gaza to 50,399.
- Al Jazeera Arabic reported that an Israeli strike hit a house in Khan Yunis, killing a Palestinian journalist, his wife and their three children.
- An Israeli strike in Dahieh, killed Hassan Bdair, a Hezbollah and Quds Force member whom Israeli authorities accused of coordination with Hamas to conduct a significant and imminent attack against Israel and three others including a woman. Seven others were injured.
- The IDF said that it downed one rocket fired from north Gaza. The IDF issued evacuation orders for Beit Hanoun, saying that projectiles were launched from the area. The al-Quds Brigades said that it launched the rockets.
- Al Jazeera reported that a child died from injuries sustained in an Israeli strike in Khan Yunis.
- Wafa reported that at least four Palestinians were wounded in an Israeli settler attack in Al-Auja, Jericho.
- The IDF said that it found a bomb-producing lab in Tulkarm and arrested 27 wanted Palestinians from the West Bank.
- The World Food Programme said that it closed its remaining bakeries in Gaza due to lack of food supplies under the Israeli blockade.
- Israel Hayom reported that Palestinians stoned passing vehicles near Duma, which sparked an Israeli demonstration near the Duma junction that was also attacked. Later, Israeli settlers set fire to some houses in Duma. The IDF said that later a clash broke out between Israeli settlers and Palestinians, injuring several Palestinians.
- Houthi media reported US airstrikes throughout Houthi-controlled territory of Yemen, including Saada, Hajjah and Hodeidah.
- The Houthis said that they targeted the USS Harry S. Truman using rockets and drones while it sailed on the Red Sea.

=== 2 April ===
- The Gaza Health Ministry reported that 24 bodies of Palestinians killed in Israeli attacks arrived at hospitals throughout Gaza in the past 24 hours, increasing its count of the Palestinian death toll in Gaza to 50,423.
- Israeli Defence Minister Israel Katz said that the IDF started ground operations in Rafah, adding that Israeli forces will move to clear areas of militants and infrastructure, and seize extensive territory that will be added to the buffer zones of Israel.
- Al-Masirah reported that US strikes in Al Hudaydah Governorate killed at least four people. According to Houthi-backed authorities, US strikes hit the water management building in El Mansouria district. Houthi media also reported US strikes in Saada Governorate.
- The IDF said that it killed a militant who approached the border fence in south Gaza.
- An Israeli strike hit a UNRWA clinic sheltering displaced people in the Jabalia refugee camp, killing at least 22 people including women and children. The IDF said that it targeted militants in a command center.
- The Gaza Interior Ministry said that an Israeli strike hit police officers and personnel in Deir el-Balah, killing two and wounding five others.
- The IDF said that it detained 401 "wanted" Palestinians from the West Bank during Ramadan.
- Al Jazeera reported that a 15-year-old Palestinian boy was shot dead by Israeli forces in Silat al-Harithiya, West Bank.
- Al-Masirah reported a US strike in Saada.
- Al Jazeera reported that an Israeli strike in Deir el-Balah killed at least two people including a child. It also reported that Israeli strikes hit south Khan Yunis, killing at least 10 farmers.
- The IDF said that it targeted more than 50 militant sites belonging to Hamas and other militant groups overnight. It also said that it conducted dozens more strikes throughout Gaza during the day.
- The IDF said that air defences intercepted two rockets fired from north Gaza towards Sderot. PIJ claimed responsibility.
- Al-Masirah reported that a US strike in the Ras Issa district of Al-Salif in Al Hudaydah Governorate killed one person and wounded another.
- Wafa reported that an Israeli strike hit a group of people in al-Manshiyya street of Beit Lahia, killing two people.
- Wafa reported that an Israeli strike hit al-Manara neighbourhood of Khan Yunis, killing six people including a woman and her three children.
- At least nine people were killed in Israeli artillery bombardment on Syrian air bases and Damascus during an IDF incursion into Daraa governorate.

=== 3 April ===
- The Gaza Health Ministry reported that 97 people were killed in Israeli attacks in the past 24 hours and three additional bodies of people killed in previous attacks were recovered in the same time, increasing its count of the Palestinian death toll in Gaza to 50,523.
- Al-Masirah reported that US fighter jets conducted more strikes, including a strike which hit a communications network in Jabal Namah, in Jablah district of Ibb Governorate, killing one person. It also reported that US forces conducted two strikes in Kitaf wa Al Boqe'e district, and a strike on the Kahlan area east of Saada.
- The Palestinian Information Center reported that an Israeli strike hit a tent sheltering displaced people in al-Mawasi, killing two people including a child and injuring several others.
- The Quds News Network and NNA reported that Israeli forces conducted strikes in the Naqoura area, including one on a house.
- Al Jazeera Arabic reported that an Israeli strike hit a house in Qizan Abu Rash, south of Khan Yunis, killing a Palestinian woman and injuring several others.
- Houthi-linked media reported a US strike on a car in Majz district.
- The IDF warned residents of Shuja'iyya and nearby areas to evacuate to shelters in western Gaza City.
- Hungarian Prime Minister Viktor Orban's government announced Hungary's withdrawal from the International Criminal Court after Israeli Prime Minister Benjamin Netanyahu, sought under an ICC arrest warrant for alleged war crimes in the Gaza war, arrived for a state visit.
- Hospital officials in Gaza said that at least 55 people, including over a dozen children were killed in overnight Israeli strikes throughout Gaza.
- The Houthis said that they targeted the USS Harry S Truman in the north of the Red Sea using cruise missiles and drones.
- NNA reported that an Israeli airstrike on a vehicle in Alma ash-Shaab injured one person. The IDF said that it conducted a drone strike on a Hezbollah militant.
- An Israeli strike hit the Dar al-Arqam school sheltering displaced people in Tuffah, killing at least 31 people including children, women, and elderly and injuring over 100 others. The IDF said that it targeted key Hamas militants in a command center.
- The IDF said that it killed a Palestinian suspect who threw explosives on soldiers in the vicinity of Jenin.
- The IDF said that it killed over 250 militants including 12 al-Qassam Brigades senior militants and politburo members in Gaza since 18 March. It also said that it entered a new phase of fighting Hamas.
- The IDF said that it shot an armed Palestinian suspect who approached the Gilboa Post.
- The IDF said that air defences downed one rocket fired from Gaza. PIJ claimed responsibility. It later ordered residents of some parts of Gaza City to evacuate.
- Wafa reported that Israeli settlers, backed by Israeli forces, established an outpost and started preparing infrastructure to capture more Palestinian land in the vicinity of Bedouin community of Hathrura close to East Jerusalem. It also reported that Israeli settlers cut down olive trees and removed fences in Palestinian land in Marda, Salfit.

=== 4 April ===
- The Gaza Health Ministry reported that 86 people were killed in Israeli attacks in the past 24 hours, increasing its count of the Palestinian death toll in Gaza to 50,609.
- Al-Masirah reported that US fighter jets carried out bombings in al-Asayid area of Kitaf wa Al Boqe'e district.
- A 17-year-old Palestinian teenager was shot and killed by Israeli forces overnight. The IDF said that he threw stones at "Route 375” and Israeli units in the vicinity of Husan.
- Al Jazeera Arabic reported that Israeli strikes destroyed a desalination plant in Tuffah.
- Al Jazeera reported that an Israeli strike hit a tent in western Khan Yunis, killing at least one woman and wounding others.
- The Quds News Network and the Palestinian Information Center reported that an Israeli strike hit a house in al-Manara, southeast of Khan Yunis, killing at least 19 people, mostly women and children.
- Lebanese Civil Defence said that at least three people were killed in an Israeli strike on an apartment in Sidon. A senior al-Qassam Brigades commander, his son and daughter were killed.
- Israeli settlers set fire to a vehicle owned by a Palestinians and hurled Molotov cocktails towards houses containing civilians in Qira, Salfit.
- The IDF said that it expanded its ground operations in north Gaza with the goal of expanding its buffer zone, adding that it killed several militants and destroyed military infrastructure, including a Hamas command center.
- Al Jazeera reported that an Israeli strike in northeastern Rafah killed two people including a woman.
- The IDF said that it killed a Hamas Nukhba force company's deputy commander in a recent drone strike in north Gaza.
- The Houthis said that they targeted the USS Harry Truman and other US surface vessels using cruise missiles.
- The Trump administration advanced the sale of over 20,000 assault rifles to Israel delayed by the Biden administration due to concerns over its use by extremist settlers.
- Médecins Sans Frontières said that an Israeli strike killed one of its workers, along with his wife and daughter.
- The IDF and Shin Bet announced that it killed a Hamas militant involved in funneling money to the al-Qassam Brigades in an airstrike one day prior.
- Clashes were reported between Israeli settlers and Palestinians in Beit Furik.
- The IDF said that it shot down a drone fired "from east". The Houthis said that they launched the drone and shot down a Giant Shark F360 reconnaissance drone over Saada Governorate with "a locally made surface-to-air missile”.
- The IDF said that it killed a Mujahideen Brigades militant who oversaw the kidnapping of Shiri Bibas and her two young children in an airstrike.
- Israeli settlers, protected by Israeli forces beat Palestinian shepherds in the vicinity of Al-Maniya and attempted to steal their sheep.

=== 5 April ===
- The Gaza Health Ministry reported that 60 people were killed in Israeli attacks in the past 24 hours, increasing its count of the Palestinian death toll in Gaza to 50,669.
- Al Masirah reported that US fighter jets conducted two air strikes on the Kahlan area east of Saada.
- Al Jazeera reported that an Israeli strike hit as-Sikka Street in Zaytun Quarter, killing a woman.
- Al Jazeera reported that an Israeli strike hit Qizan Abu Rashwan neighbourhood of Khan Yunis, killing a Palestinian child.
- Al Jazeera reported that an Israeli strike in Shuja'iyya killed at least three people including a woman.
- A settler attack was reported in Masafer Yatta.
- The IDF said it entered the Morag Corridor the previous week.
- Settlers protected by Israeli forces attacked Palestinian farmers and vehicles in the vicinity of Al-Mughayyir, Ramallah.
- Yemeni media reported that four other US airstrikes hit Saada. Al Masirah also reported that a US strike hit a solar energy store in the Hafsin area, west of Saada, killing two one person and injuring at least four others. United States Central Command said that its strikes targeted Houthi targets.

=== 6 April ===
- The Gaza Health Ministry reported that at least 26 people were killed in Israeli attacks in the past 24 hours, increasing its count of the Palestinian death toll in Gaza to 50,695.
- Al Jazeera reported that an Israeli strike in Khan Yunis, killed 19 people.
- Al Jazeera reported that an Israeli strike hit a house in Zaytun Quarter, killing a child.
- Israeli settlers protected by Israeli forces attacked Palestinian farmers and vehicles in the vicinity of Ramallah.
- Al Masirah reported that casualties from US strikes in Saada increased to four deaths and 16 injuries, while US forces carried out five strikes on Kamaran.
- The Palestinian Information Center reported that an Israeli strike hit a tent sheltering displaced Palestinians in Khan Yunis, killing a Palestinian child.
- Israeli forces fired live ammunition, tear gas, and stun grenades on a group of people in Wadi Abu Hummus area, east of Bethlehem, injuring three people including a 17-year-old.
- The Lebanese Health Ministry reported that an Israeli strike in Zibqin killed two people. The IDF said that it targeted two Hezbollah militants trying to restore militant infrastructure.
- An Israeli strike hit a home in Deir el-Balah, killing four people and injuring others including women and children.
- The IDF said that it struck over 130 targets in Gaza in the weekend. Per the IDF, the strikes targeted Hamas militants, militants from other militant groups and infrastructure, including tunnels and command centers.
- Medical sources in Gaza said that an Israeli strike in Tuffah killed 11 people, including nine children.
- The IDF said that air defences intercepted five of 10 rockets launched from Gaza towards Ashdod. At least one rocket impacted in Ashkelon, causing damage to a road and several parked vehicles and shrapnel slightly injuring a man. al-Qassam Brigades said that it launched rockets at Ashdod. The IDF issued evacuation warnings for Palestinians in Deir al-Balah to move to south, saying that rockets were launched from the area, and struck the rocket launcher used to fire the rockets.
- Israeli gunfire in the outskirts of Turmus Ayya killed a 14-year-old Palestinian-American boy and injured two others. The IDF said that it targeted those who hurled rocks. The boy's family and one of the surviving boys denied the allegation, saying that they were picking almonds. His father said that even if the boys had hurled stones, the troops could have fired warning shots to scare them away, or could have chased and detained them.
- The Houthi-run Health Ministry said that US air strike hit a house in Sanaa, killing four people including two women and injured 16 others.

=== 7 April ===
- The Gaza Government Media Office reported that at least 57 people were killed in Israeli attacks in the past 24 hours, increasing its count of the Palestinian death toll in Gaza to 50,752.
- An Israeli strike hit a home in Khan Yunis, killing nine people and wounding others. A survivor said that those killed were children.
- An Israeli strike hit a tent housing journalists in the vicinity of Nasser Hospital, killing two people including a journalist and injuring at least seven other journalists, two of them seriously. The IDF and Shin Bet said that they carried out an airstrike targeting a photojournalist who entered into Israel with Hamas militants during the 7 October attacks. Later one more Palestinian journalist died from the injuries sustained in the strike.
- An Israeli strike hit a building west of Deir el-Balah, killing at least two people and injuring several others after an evacuation warning.
- Al Masirah reported that three US strikes hit Al Ammar in As Safra district while three strikes hit Bani Hassan area in Abs district.
- Five people including a girl were arrested by Israeli forces in Jalazone.
- Nine Palestinians including a minor were arrested by Israeli forces in Qalqilya and Hebron.
- The Lebanese Health Ministry said that an Israeli drone strike in Taybeh killed one person. The IDF said that it killed a Hezbollah commander who led a rocket unit in the area and several rocket attacks on Upper Galilee.
- NNA reported that an Israeli drone strike on a car in Beit Lif injured one person.
- The IDF said that it shot down a drone fired towards Israel "from the east" prior to entering Israel. The Houthis said that they launched a drone at an IDF target in Jaffa and targeted two US destroyers in the Red Sea using cruise missiles and a drone.
- Five Palestinians including a 14-year-old boy were wounded during a settler attack in Umm al-Khair, Hebron.
- NNA reported that an Israeli strike on a motorcycle in Dardara road in Marjayoun District killed two Syrians and a Lebanese national.
- Palestinians in the West Bank went on strike by closing businesses, shops and private institutions to protest against Israel's part in the Gaza war.
- An Israeli strike hit a charity kitchen in Khan Yunis where people gathered to receive food, killing at least six people and injured 10 others including children.

=== 8 April ===
- The Gaza Health Ministry reported that at least 58 people were killed in Israeli attacks in the past 24 hours, increasing its count of the Palestinian death toll in Gaza to 50,810.
- Al Masirah reported a series of US strikes in Sanaa, six US attacks on Al Jumaimah area of the Bani Hushaysh district and on the Jarban area of Sanhan District. It also reported at least two strikes in Kamaran island. It later reported that more US attacks hit Sanaa Governorate and Marib Governorate. Saudi media outlet AlHadath reported that US strikes in Yemen killed the head of Houthi intelligence. Unnamed sources told AlHadath that two airstrikes hit Houthi weapons storing sites in Kamaran island and an ammunition depot in the al-Juba area of Marib Governorate.
- Al Jazeera reported that Israeli forces displaced residents from a building in Rujeib and arrested two brothers including a 14-year-old boy in Ni'lin.
- AP reported that at least 25 people including eight children and five women were killed in Israeli strikes in Gaza overnight and into the day. One of those strikes hit a house in Deir al-Balah, killing 11 people including five children.
- Wafa reported that a wedding hall in Biddya was set on fire by Israeli settlers.
- A Palestinian woman who allegedly threw stones towards Israeli soldiers and vehicles in the Gitai Avisar junction in the vicinity of Ariel was shot by Israeli forces.
- The IDF said that it dissolved a platoon of reservists and punished several officers for vandalising a camp in the West Bank.
- US strikes hit Amin Moqbel area of Hodeidah, killing at 13 people. The Houthis said that multiple strikes hit a “residential” district and most of the casualties were women and children. Houthi-affiliated media said that US strikes hit a telecommunications network in the Shawa area of Amran Governorate.
- The IDF said that it struck a Hezbollah weapons depot in the Beqaa Valley.
- An Israeli strike in the vicinity of a Médecins Sans Frontières clinic in al-Mawasi killed two people, including a two-year-old boy and injured seven others.
- A Bedouin community northwest of Jericho was attacked by masked Israeli settlers.

=== 9 April ===
- The Gaza Health Ministry reported that dozens more people were killed in Israeli attacks in the past 24 hours, increasing its count of the Palestinian death toll in Gaza to 50,846.
- Al Jazeera reported that an Israeli strike hit tents sheltering displaced Palestinians west of Khan Yunis killed two elderly people including a woman and wounded several others.
- The IDF said that it demolished the house of a Palestinian militant in Deir Ibzi who killed an Israeli soldier and injured six others during a shootout in the vicinity of Dolev in March 2024. Additionally, they demolished the house of a Palestinian prisoner in Hebron.
- Al Jazeera reported that Israeli forces arrested three Palestinians and beat a 15-year-old while raiding a “large number of homes” in Balata Camp.
- Wafa reported that Israeli forces arrested five people including a 17-year-old high school student from Yatta, Hebron. It also reported that Israeli forces "beat him severely" prior to arresting him.
- The Houthis claimed to have downed a General Atomics MQ-9 Reaper over Al Jawf Governorate.
- al Jazeera reported that Israeli authorities forced a Palestinian to demolish his own house in Beit Safafa, southeast of East Jerusalem.
- Al Jazeera reported that an Israeli strike in the Israeli-designated safe zone of al-Mawasi killed three people including a young girl, a woman and injured several others.
- An Israeli airstrike in Shuja'iyya killed at least 35 people including children and women, injured at least 70 others and more than 20 others were trapped under the ruins. The IDF said that it targeted a Hamas "command and control center" where it said militants were planning attacks. It also said that it killed a Hamas commander who it said participated in the 7 October attacks.
- Another Israeli airstrike in Shuja'iyya, hours after the first one, killed at least five people.
- The IDF said it arrested two Palestinian militants from the West Bank.
- The IDF said it conducted air strikes on 45 targets throughout Gaza in the past 24 hours. It also said that it destroyed tunnel openings and infrastructure in Tel al-Sultan refugee camp and along the Morag Corridor, killed militants and destroyed a stockpile of combat equipment in Shuja'iyya.
- An Israeli strike hit a group of civilians in Tuffah, killing at least one Palestinian.
- The IDF said that it expanded its operation in north West Bank to Nablus.
- The IDF accused Hezbollah of trying to rebuild a weapons manufacturing site in Beirut in violation of the truce.
- The IDF said that a ballistic missile fired by the Houthis towards Israel landed in Saudi Arabia.
- NNA reported that an Israeli drone targeted an area near a public school in Ramiyah, Lebanon without causing casualties.

=== 10 April ===
- The Gaza Health Ministry reported that at least 41 people were killed in Israeli attacks in the past 24 hours, increasing its count of the Palestinian death toll in Gaza to 50,887.
- Al Jazeera reported that Israeli forces forced families in eastern neighbourhoods of Tulkarm to evacuate.
- Al Jazeera reported that a Palestinian journalist was arrested by Israeli forces in his house in Nablus.
- A house and vehicle belonging to Palestinians were set on fire by Israeli settlers in Qira, Salfit.
- Israeli forces demolished the house of a Palestinian militant in Tulkarm who was involved in a 2023 shooting which killed an off-duty IDF reservist.
- Israeli forces wounded four Palestinians at an IDF checkpoint in Jericho.
- The Houthi-run Health Ministry said that US airstrikes in As Sabain district of Sanaa killed at least three "civilians". Houthi media also reported several more strikes in Sanaa, including the Bani Hushaysh district. The Houthis also reported US airstrikes in Kamaran island.
- Ma'an News Agency reported that Israeli forces demolished Palestinian houses sheltering 15 people in a village in the vicinity of Hebron.
- The IDF said that it struck more than 35 targets including militants, infrastructure, sniper posts and observation posts which “posed a threat" in Gaza in the last day. It also said that it killed several militants and destroyed infrastructures used by Hamas in the Morag Corridor, Tel al-Sultan refugee camp, and north Gaza.
- Israeli state prosecutors indicted six Arab Israelis suspected of transferring funds from Turkey to militant groups in the West Bank.
- The IDF and Shin Bet said that they killed 11 militants who participated in the 7 October attacks in recent strikes in Gaza.
- An Israeli strike hit the vicinity of Nasser Hospital, killing a Palestinian woman and injuring two others.
- Lebanese TV Station Al Jadeed reported that the Lebanese Army entered Hezbollah bases north of the Litani River after Hezbollah surrendered bases in the area to the Lebanese Army for the first time.
- Israeli police arrested 23 protesters in an anti-war demonstration in Haifa.
- An Israeli strike hit a home in Jabalia al-Balad, killing a Palestinian child and injuring several others.
- Israeli forces wounded three Palestinians in Al-Bireh's Sateh Marhaba neighbourhood.

=== 11 April ===
- Al Jazeera reported that Israeli forces detained the mother and brother of a wanted Palestinian man from Jenin to force him to surrender. Clashes broke out between Palestinian militants, including the al-Quds Brigades, and Israeli forces in the Old City of Nablus.
- Al Jazeera reported that an Israeli strike hit a home in Sheikh Nasser, east of Khan Yunis, killing 10 people including seven children, a woman and injuring several others.
- US fighter jets conducted a wave of strikes in Houthi-controlled areas of Yemen including Sanaa, Faj Attan in Ma'ain district, Jabal Nuqum and Bani Hushaysh district.
- Al Jazeera reported that an Israeli strike hit a house in Katiba, north of Khan Yunis, killing at least 10 family members including at least three children and two women.
- The Jenin Brigades claimed that it detonated a “highly explosive device” targeting IDF vehicles at the entrance to Silat al-Harithiya.
- Palestinian media reported that an Israeli strike hit a group of civilians in al-Atatra neighbourhood of Beit Lahia, killing two people and injuring several others.
- The IDF warned Palestinians residing in some areas of eastern Gaza City to evacuate to shelters in western Gaza City.
- Al Jazeera reported that an Israeli strike hit a group of civilians in Deir el-Balah, causing several casualties.
- The IDF said that it killed the commander of sniper forces of Hamas's Tel Sultan Battalion in Rafah in a recent strike. It also said that it killed several militants, destroyed booby-trapped buildings and Hamas infrastructure during operations in Tel Sultan and Shaboura neighborhoods of Rafah, the Morag Corridor and north Gaza. It also announced that the IAF targeted almost 40 sites in Gaza including militants, buildings, weapons, and other infrastructure.
- Israeli police said that it arrested two Galilee residents for planning attacks with the Tulkarm Brigade.
- The IDF said that it found a Hamas tunnel built under a kindergarten in Rafah.
- Al Jazeera reported that a home in Jenin refugee camp was burned down by Israeli forces after seizing and using it as a barracks for 10 days.
- The IDF said that it arrested 85 wanted Palestinians from the West Bank in the past week.
- The IDF said that a soldier from 12th Battalion of Golani Brigade was critically injured in south Gaza after an accidental misfire.
- Al Jazeera reported that an Israeli strike hit civilians in Rafah, killing one person and injuring four others.
- Head of the paediatrics department at Nasser Hospital said that Gaza reached famine's fifth phase.
- The IDF said it downed a drone fired towards Israel “from the east” in the vicinity of the Dead Sea. The Houthis said that they launched two drones towards two IDF targets in Tel Aviv. Per the IDF, the second drone was unable to reach Israel.
- The IDF said that an IDF officer was moderately injured during an exchange of fire with Palestinian militants in south Gaza. It also said that it returned fire and killed two of the militants while a drone strike killed a third.
- Al Jazeera reported that Israeli forces forced residents to evacuate from several buildings in Tulkarm.
- Al Jazeera reported that an Israeli strike hit a tent sheltering displaced people in al-Mawasi, killing one Palestinian and injuring several others.
- Al Jazeera reported that Israeli forces fired live ammunition and sound bombs in Beit Fajjar, injuring a 17-year-old Palestinian teenager.

=== 12 April ===
- The Gaza Health Ministry reported that Palestinian death toll in Israeli attacks in Gaza increased to 50,912.
- An Israeli strike hit a home in Tuffah, killing two people and injuring several people including two young girls. Israeli fire reportedly hit a group of civilians in south Khan Yunis. Israeli strikes reportedly hit tent shelters in the Israeli-designated safe zone of al-Mawasi area, causing civilian casualties.
- A 16-year-old Palestinian boy was critically wounded in a car ramming attack by an Israeli settler.
- The Morag Corridor was completely captured by the IDF.
- The IDF said that air defences intercepted three rockets fired from Gaza towards Israel. The al-Qassam Brigades said that it launched a “Rajum” short-range 114mm rocket system. The IDF later issued warnings for residents of many neighborhoods in Khan Yunis to evacuate, saying that rockets were fired from the area.
- The IDF said that an IDF reservist was critically wounded during operations on the Lebanon border. Per an initial IDF investigation, the soldier was critically wounded after soldiers mistakenly entered an Israeli minefield.
- Clashes broke out between Palestinians and Israeli forces during an Israeli raid in Beit Furik.
- The IDF said that it expanded its offensive to Daraj and Tuffah neighborhoods of Gaza City. It added that it killed several militants and destroyed observation posts, tunnels, and other Hamas infrastructure.
- An Israeli settler attack in the vicinity of Kafr ad-Dik wounded at least two Palestinians and damaged several vehicles.
- The IDF said that it downed a rocket fired from Gaza towards Israel. It later issued evacuation orders for residents of six neighborhoods in Nuseirat, saying that rockets were launched from there.
- Al Masirah reported that US strikes hit several areas in Yemen including a vocational institute in As Sawma'ah district. It also reported that three strikes hit al-Salheen in Saada Governorate.
- Israeli strikes hit a building inside Al-Ahli Arab Hospital, destroying the emergency and reception department and damaging other structures. According to hospital officials, patients were evacuated after one person said that he received a call from someone who identified himself with Israeli security forces shortly prior to the attack. At least three people including a 12-year-old boy died due to the evacuation. The IDF and Shin Bet claimed that they struck a Hamas command center without providing evidence and accused Hamas of exploiting civilian buildings and the civilian population for operations.

=== 13 April ===
- The Gaza Health Ministry reported that the bodies of 11 people killed in Israeli attacks were brought to hospitals throughout Gaza in the past 24 hours, increasing its count of the Palestinian death toll in Gaza to 50,944.
- Israeli forces forced families to evacuate from their houses in the outskirts of Nur Shams.
- The al-Quds Brigades claimed that it seized two Israeli quadcopter drones while conducting reconnaissance missions in central Gaza.
- An Israeli strike in Khan Yunis killed West Khan Yunis police station's director.
- Palestinian media reported that an Israeli strike hit Deir al-Balah municipality building, killing at least three people. The IDF and Shin Bet claimed that it struck a Hamas command center.
- The PRCS said that it was informed by the International Committee of the Red Cross that a medic who was missing since the Rafah paramedic massacre in March was being held by Israeli authorities.
- Wafa reported that an Israeli settler attack in Khirbet Lahlaweh in the Masafer Yatta area wounded two young Palestinian girls, while Israeli forces arrested at least five Palestinians who attempted to defend their children from the attacks.
- The IDF said that air defences intercepted one rocket fired from Gaza. It later warned Palestinians in several neighborhoods of Khan Yunis to evacuate. Two Israeli strikes were later reported in Abasan al-Kabira and Khuza'a, Khan Yunis.
- The IDF said that it struck more than 90 targets and killed militants in Gaza in the last 48 hours including a Hamas command center in Daraj Quarter and Tuffah areas of Gaza City, and weapons and other Hamas infrastructure in the Morag Corridor, Tel al-Sultan refugee camp, and north Gaza.
- An Israeli strike hit the Israeli designated safe zone of al-Mawasi, killing two Palestinians. Another Israeli strike hit a group of civilians in Beit Lahia.
- The IDF said that it destroyed a tunnel measuring 1.2 kilometer in north Gaza.
- The IDF said that air defenses "apparently" intercepted one missile fired by Houthis towards Israel. The Houthis said that they targeted Sdot Micha Airbase and Arrow batteries east of Ashdod using a Palestine 2 missile and Ben Gurion Airport using a Zulfiqar missile, which apparently fell short. They also claimed that they targeted a "vital Israeli target" in Askelon using a drone.
- Palestinian media reported that an Israeli strike on a car in Deir al-Balah killed seven people. The IDF said that it targeted a Hamas sniper cell's deputy commander.
- The Houthi-run Yemeni Health Ministry reported that US strikes hit a ceramics factory in Bani Matar district, killing seven people and injured 29 others including five children and a women, one of them seriously. It added that the victims were workers from a factory and residents of homes next to it. Al-Masirah reported that two US strikes targeted al-Yatmah in Khabb wa ash Sha'af district of Al Jawf Governorate.
- The Houthis claimed that they shot down an US General Atomics MQ-9 Reaper over Hajjah Governorate with a locally made surface-to-air missile.
- At least six people including four children were detained during an Israeli raid on Kobar coinciding with a settler attack on its outskirts.
- An Israeli strike hit a home in Jabalia refugee camp, killing seven people, including two women and injuring three others including a pregnant woman.

=== 14 April ===
- The Gaza Health Ministry reported that at least 38 people were killed in Israeli attacks throughout Gaza in the past 24 hours, increasing its count of the Palestinian death toll in Gaza to 50,983.
- Houthi-run Health Ministry said that US strikes in Yemen killed 123 people including children and women and injured 247 others.
- An Israeli strike killed six brothers including children who were delivering food in Deir el-Balah.
- The IDF said that it struck more than 35 targets throughout Gaza in the last day including a weapons manufacturing site in central Gaza, a primed rocket launching site, a militant cell planning to ambush Israeli forces in north Gaza, a Hamas tunnel in Shaboura camp, a Hamas weapons cache hidden in a former school nearby, and another cache and several tunnel shafts in the Morag Corridor.
- Israeli strikes in the Israeli-designated "humanitarian zone" of al-Mawasi in southern Gaza killed at least one person and injured others.
- Vast areas of land belonging to Palestinians were razed by Israeli forces and settlers who also chased shepherds in al-Burj, Hebron and Masafer Yatta. Settlers also tried to steal livestock from a residential community in the northern Jordan Valley.
- The al-Quds Brigades claimed that its snipers shot an Israeli soldier in Shuja'iyya.
- Wafa reported that Israeli strikes hit a house in the al-Sha’af area east of Tuffah, killing six civilians and wounding others.
- Wafa reported that Israeli forces forced families to evacuate from their houses in al-Matar neighbourhood of Tulkarm Camp. It also reported that residents of Jabal al-Salihin in Nur Shams were ordered by Israeli forces to evacuate from their houses without being allowed to retrieve their personal belongings.
- Wafa reported that Israeli settlers hurled stones at Palestinian cars north of Jericho on the road to Wadi Auja, causing damage to a vehicle, and attacked Bedouins and shepherds in the vicinity of Ein ad-Duyuk at-Tahta. It added that an Israeli settler opened fire towards shepherds in Tal Ma’in.
- Al-Masirah reported that 15 US strikes hit Raghwan district and Medghal district in Marib Governorate.
- An Israeli strike hit the vicinity of al-Yabani neighbourhood of Khan Yunis, injuring several people, including children.

=== 15 April ===
- The Gaza Health Ministry reported that at least 17 people were killed in Israeli attacks throughout Gaza in the past 24 hours, increasing its count of the Palestinian death toll in Gaza to 51,000.
- The IDF and Shin Bet announced that they killed the commander of a cell in the Nukhba force’s Deir al-Balah Battalion who participated in the 7 October attacks in a strike in central Gaza two weeks prior.
- A Palestinian child was injured during an Israeli raid in the West Bank.
- Israeli settlers protected by Israeli forces attacked Palestinian houses in Khalil al-Louz, southeast of Bethlehem.
- An Israeli strike hit northern gate of the Kuwaiti Field Hospital in al-Mawasi, killing one medic and injuring nine patients and medics.
- An Israeli drone strike struck a car in Aitaroun. The Lebanese Health Ministry reported the strike killed two people including a 17-year-old and wounded two others. The IDF said that it killed a team commander in Hezbollah's special operations unit.
- The IDF and Shin Bet announced that they killed a commander of Hamas’ Shujaeya battalion in a strike in Shuja'iyya two days prior.
- The al-Qassam Brigades claimed that it lost contact with militants holding American-Israeli soldier hostage Edan Alexander after Israeli bombing.
- Israeli settlers stole 250 sheep belonging to a Palestinian in Wadi Qelt.
- Al Masirah reported that US air strikes hit Kamaran island and Az Zahir district.
- Al Masirah reported that at least 13 US strikes hit al-Salem and Kitaf wa Al Boqe'e district of Saada Governorate. It also reported that US strikes hit Harf Sufyan district and the outskirts of Sanaa.
- Two people including a Palestinian child were wounded during an Israeli raid in Qabatiya.
- An Israeli strike hit a home in the vicinity of Nasser Hospital, killing a Palestinian child.
- NNA reported three consecutive Israeli strikes in Wadi Mazlam on the outskirts of Ramya in Nabatieh Governorate. The IDF said that its overnight strikes hit Hezbollah infrastructure.
- The IDF found a dog abducted during the 7 October attacks in south Gaza.
- United Kingdom Maritime Trade Operations said that shots were fired after a vessel 100 nautical miles east of Aden was followed by several small vessels for almost two hours.

=== 16 April ===
- The Gaza Health Ministry reported that at least 25 people were killed in Israeli attacks throughout Gaza, increasing its count of the Palestinian death toll in Gaza to 51,025.
- The IDF and Shin Bet announced that they killed a senior Hamas commander who participated in the 2014 Nahal Oz attack in a strike in Gaza City a few days prior.
- Al Jazeera reported that a journalist was arrested by Israeli forces from his house in Beit Sira.
- An Israeli strike hit a house in Tuffah, killing a female Palestinian journalist and her 10 family members including several women and children and seriously wounding 13 others. The IDF said that it targeted a Hamas militant. Another Israeli strike hit Khan Yunis, killing a child.
- AFP reported that an Israeli drone struck a car in Wadi al-Hujeir.
- The IDF said that it killed a Radwan Force member in a drone strike in Al-Qantara, Marjayoun.
- The IDF said that it killed a PIJ militant who was involved in the 2025 al-Funduq shooting in the vicinity of Jenin.
- The IDF said that two American tourists were slightly wounded after militants hurled stones and a paint bottle at a tourist bus in the vicinity of Burqa, Ramallah.
- An Israeli strike in Hanin, Lebanon killed one person and wounded another. The IDF said that it conducted a drone strike on a Hezbollah militant.
- An Israeli strike hit a building in Rafah, killing a girl and injuring her mother.
- The Lebanese Army said that it arrested Lebanese and Palestinians suspected of launching rockets towards Israel from south Lebanon on 22 March and 25 March.
- An Israeli strike hit the outskirts of Zalutiyeh.
- Al Masirah reported that one person was killed in a US strike in al-Nahda residential neighbourhood of al-Thawra district. It also reported that 14 US strikes hit al-Hafa area of As Sabain district. It added that three US strikes hit Bani Hushaysh district and US forces targeted Manakhah district and Al Hazm district.
- The IDF said that it demolished the house of a Hamas militant in Burqin, Palestine who was involved in the killing of one of its soldiers.
- The al-Qassam Brigades claimed it targeted three Israeli Merkava tanks in the vicinity of al-Wafa Hospital, east of Tuffah.
- An Israeli strike hit a tent in the vicinity of the Tayba Towers, west of Khan Yunis, killing at least two Palestinians including a child and injured seven others.
- An Israeli strike hit a tent camp in the Israeli-designated safe zone in al-Mawasi, killing at least 10 people including children.
- Hamas militants reportedly killed a Gazan man who did not let them hide among civilians in a Gaza city school compound that was housing displaced people.

=== 17 April ===
- The Gaza Health Ministry reported that at least 40 people were killed in Israeli attacks throughout Gaza, increasing its count of the Palestinian death toll in Gaza to 51,065.
- An overnight Israeli strike hit tents in al-Mawasi, killing at least 16 people, mostly women and children and injuring 23 others.
- An Israeli strike hit a tent in Jabalia, killing at least seven people, mostly children and injuring others.
- Al-Masirah reported that US fighter jets conducted more strikes in Al Munirah district.
- Clashes were reported between Palestinian youths and Palestinian National Security Forces in Al-Am'ari.
- The IDF said that it struck Hezbollah facilities in its overnight strike in south Lebanon.
- An Israeli strike hit a group of tents in Khan Yunis, killing at least 10 people including a disabled boy, five other children, five women and injuring seven others.
- A 20-year-old Palestinian prisoner died in Israeli custody.
- An Israeli strike hit a UN school sheltering displaced Palestinians in Jabalia refugee camp, killing six people. The IDF said it targeted a Hamas militant in a command and control compound.
- The IDF said that it demolished a Hamas training camp belonging to its Shaboura Battalion in Morag Corridor. It also said it captured a weapons cache and destroyed other Hamas infrastructure in the area.
- The IDF and Shin Bet said that they killed the head of Hamas's smuggling unit in an airstrike in Khan Yunis. The IDF also said that it killed a prominent PIJ militant in another strike in Khan Yunis in the past week, while the IAF struck about 110 targets in Gaza in the last two days, including a Hamas naval force building in Nuseirat.
- Israeli strikes in Deir el-Balah and Rafah killed five Palestinians, including a young girl.
- An Israeli air strike in Aitaroun killed one person.
- An Israeli strike hit a house in Jabalia, killing four civilians and injured many others.
- An Israeli settler attack in Khirbet al-Rakeez in Masafer Yatta injured a Palestinian.
- The IDF said that it killed the deputy commander of Hezbollah forces in Mhaibib in a drone strike in Blida, Lebanon.
- The Red Cross said that an explosive damaged one of its facilities in Gaza one day prior.
- The US military said that it struck Ras Issa fuel port in western Yemen, saying that it was a Houthi fuel source. Al-Mashirah reported that the strike killed at least 80 people and injured at least 150 others.
- The IDF said that it killed two Palestinians and injured another person who hurled stones towards Israeli motorists in the vicinity of Osarin. One of those killed included a 16-year-old boy.

=== 18 April ===
- An Israeli strike on Tel al-Zaatar, east of Jabalia refugee camp killed five people including children and injured several others.
- An Israeli strike hit a house in Bani Suheila, killing at least 13 people and injuring others.
- The IDF said that air defences intercepted a ballistic missile fired towards Israel by the Houthis, who said they targeted Ben Gurion Airport. The Houthis also claimed they shot down a US drone conducting “hostile acts” around Sanaa Governorate.
- Clashes were reported between Israeli forces and Palestinian militants in Abwein.
- An Israeli drone strike hit a car in Ghaziyeh, south of Sidon, killing one person. The IDF said that it killed a Hezbollah militant responsible for deploying its communication networks throughout Lebanon, particularly south of the Litani River.
- Two boys died due to malnutrition in Gaza.
- An Israeli strike hit al-Nasr, northeast of Rafah, killing a Palestinian woman.
- The IDF said that the IAF struck almost 40 targets including militants, buildings used by militant groups and weapons depots in Gaza in the last day. It also said that it destroyed Hamas infrastructure and killed several militants during an ambush in Tel Sultan and Shaboura areas in Rafah, and destroyed a weapons depot and directed drone strikes on militants in north Gaza.
- An Israeli settler attack in Biddya wounded one Palestinian.
- An Israeli strike hit a makeshift barbershop in Khan Yunis, killing at least six people including children.
- The IDF said that it found and destroyed several tunnels and a weapons depot in Shuja'iyya and killed a militant cell plotting a sniper attack on its forces in the previous week.
- An Israeli strike in al-Saftawi in north Gaza killed at least four people including children.
- Israeli settlers protected by Israeli forces established an illegal outpost in the vicinity of Turmus Ayya.
- An Israeli drone strike on a vehicle travelling on a road between Ayta ash-Shaab and Rmaish killed one person. The IDF said that it killed a Hezbollah militant.
- Al-Masirah reported that multiple US strikes hit the al-Hafa area of As Sabain district. It also reported four US strikes in Bani Hushaysh district.
- Al-Masirah reported three US strikes in Saada Governorate. It also reported four US strikes in Bart Al Anan district and Khabb wa ash Sha'af district.
- An Israeli strike hit a house in Khan Yunis, killing two people and injuring several others, majority of them women and children.

=== 19 April ===
- The Gaza Health Ministry reported that at least 92 people were killed in Israeli attacks throughout Gaza in the past 48 hours, increasing its count of the Palestinian death toll in Gaza to 51,157.
- Israel announced an IDF soldier of the Gaza Division was killed and five others were injured, including three critically while fighting Hamas in northern Gaza, increasing the number of Israeli soldiers killed in Gaza to 408.
- Al-Masirah reported four US strikes in Arhab district.
- Al Jazeera reported that Water pumps were stolen and crops were vandalised by Israeli settlers in Palestinian communities in Khirbet al-Deir.
- Al Jazeera reported that an Israeli strike hit the Maen area of Khan Yunis, killing a Palestinian woman and her child and injuring others.
- Al Jazeera reported that an Israeli strike hit al-Nasr, killing two women.
- Wafa reported that an Israeli strike hit a group of civilians in Hassanein Street of Shuja'iyya, killing three people and injuring several.
- al-Qassam Brigades claimed that fate of Israeli-American hostage, Edan Alexander, is unknown.
- Al Jazeera reported that an Israeli strike hit a tent in the Israeli-designated "humanitarian zone" of al-Mawasi, killing at least five people. Later, another Israeli strike in the same area killed one Palestinian and injured two others.
- The Houthis claimed to have shot down a US drone above Sanaa.
- Al Jazeera reported that Settlers attacked Ras Ein al-Auja, north of Jericho.
- Al-Masirah reported that US jets conducted 13 air strikes on Hudaydah Port and Hodeida International Airport.
- The IDF said that the IAF conducted airstrikes on more than 150 targets in Gaza including militant cells and Hamas infrastructure in the weekend. It also said that it struck dozens of targets in recent weeks in the Morag Corridor, including weapon depots and rocket launching sites, killed over 40 militants, destroyed several weapons and a Hamas pickup truck in the same area, demolished a booby-trapped tunnel measuring hundreds of metres, and found several weapons in Shaboura camp.
- The al-Qassam Brigades claimed that it caused casualties on Israeli forces by setting a tank and an IDF bulldozer on fire in Tuffah.
- Al Masirah reported that a US strike in al-Thawra, Bani Matar and al-Safiah district of Sanaa killed three people and wounded four others.
- Al Jazeera reported that a 15-year-old was detained by Israeli forces from al-Hadayeida neighbourhood of Tulkarem.
- Houthi-affiliated Yemeni media reported that US conducted at least 29 air strikes throughout Yemen in the evening, targeting Sanaa Governorate, 'Amran Governorate, Marib Governorate and Al Hudaydah Governorate.
- Al Jazeera reported that a 13-year-old Palestinian child was injured during an Israeli raid in Beit Furik. Three Palestinian children were found tied to olive trees after being abducted by Israeli settlers for over an hour from the al-Dubbat neighbourhood in the western part of Beit Furik.
- Al Jazeera reported that an Israeli strike hit a house west of Nuseirat refugee camp, killing a woman.

=== 20 April ===
- The Gaza Health Ministry reported that at least 44 people were killed in Israeli attacks throughout Gaza in the past 24 hours, increasing its count of the Palestinian death toll in Gaza to 51,201.
- The Lebanese Army announced that it thwarted a planned rocket at Israel from Lebanon and arrested those involved.
- An Israeli drone on a car in Kaoutariyet as-Siyad, situated between Sidon and Tyre, killed one person and injured another. The IDF said that it killed Hezbollah's Unit 4400 deputy head, which is responsible for weapons smuggling to Lebanon.
- Al Jazeera reported that a bus was attacked by settlers using stones in Sheikh Jarrah neighborhood of East Jerusalem. Two water tanks used for livestock were stolen by settlers in the northern Jordan Valley.
- Gaza Civil Defence said that Israeli strikes since dawn killed 20 people and wounded dozens, including women and children throughout Gaza. It also said that an Israeli strike hit a group of civilians in Rafah, killing five people.
- An Israeli strike hit a home in Houla, Lebanon, killing one person. The IDF said that it killed a Hezbollah engineering expert responsible for its engineering activities in Odaisseh.
- The IDF said that it "neutralised" a Palestinian militant who opened fire at an IDF checkpoint at the entrance of Homesh.
- The IDF said that it handed over several Israeli civilians who attempted to enter Gaza to Israeli police.
- The IDF said that it conducted a series of airstrikes in Nabatieh, targeting Hezbollah rocket launchers and other infrastructure used by the group.
- Al-Masirah reported US airstrikes in Kamaran island and Al Jubah district.
- A 49-year-old Palestinian prisoner from Bethlehem died in Israeli custody after being transferred from Ofer Prison to a hospital.
- Houthi media reported two US airstrikes in Attan area of Sanaa. It also reported that US airstrikes hit a sanitation project in Asr, Furwah and a popular market in Shaub district. The Houthis said that US strikes on a market in Sanaa killed 12 people, while strikes in al-Farwah wounded 30 people. They added that US strikes hit Saada Governorate.

=== 21 April ===
- The Gaza Health Ministry reported that at least 39 people were killed in Israeli attacks throughout Gaza in the past 24 hours, increasing its count of the Palestinian death toll in Gaza to 51,240.
- Al Jazeera reported than an Israeli strike hit a tent behind the British Hospital in the Israeli-designated safe zone of al-Mawasi in the vicinity of Khan Yunis, killing two people including a woman.
- Al Masirah reported that US forces conducted three strikes on 'Amran Governorate, two on al-Jawba district of Marib Governorate, and four on the Sarwah district of the same governorate.
- Al Jazeera reported than a Palestinian shop in Hebron was set on fire by settlers. A 16-year-old was seriously injured during an Israeli raid in Nablus. Over 10 families were displaced from their houses in Jabal an-Nasr near Nur Shams.
- Al Jazeera reported than an Israeli strike hit a home in east Khan Yunis, killing a couple and their children. A Palestinian fisherman who was attempting to catch fish was wounded by Israeli forces.
- The IDF said that it killed a militant from PIJ's rocket unit who was involved in the 7 October attacks. It also said that the IAF struck more than 200 targets across Gaza, including militant cells, weapon depots, and structures used for militant activity in the past 72 hours.
- The Houthis claimed to have launched drones at two targets in Ashkelon and Eilat, and targeted the US aircraft carriers USS Harry S. Truman and USS Carl Vinson and their naval vessels.
- Al Jazeera reported than an Israeli strike hit an area east of Rafah, killing two children.
- The IDF said that it arrested 20 wanted suspects during overnight operations throughout the West Bank, destroyed an explosive devices cache in Nur Shams, and arrested six suspects for hurling rocks in Al-Arroub.
- Israeli settlers blocked traffic and tried to attack vehicles belonging to Palestinians in Deir Ballut.
- Al Jazeera reported than an Israeli strike hit a group of people in Deir el-Balah, killing two civilians. Another Israeli strike hit a Palestinian gathering in Zaytun Quarter, killing two civilians.
- Al Jazeera reported than an Israeli strike hit a group of people in Bureij, killing one Palestinian and injured eight others including civilians.
- Almost 15 settlers set fire to property owned by a Palestinian family in on the outskirts of Sinjil. The IDF arrested a Palestinian who attempted to repel the attackers for allegedly hurling stones.
- Al Jazeera reported that a 16-year-old boy was wounded during an Israeli raid in Idna.
- Yemen's Houthi Health Ministry said that casualties from overnight US strikes on a market and a residential zone in Farwa reached 12 deaths and 34 injuries.
- UN said that it run out of tents to shelter displaced Palestinians in Gaza.
- Al Jazeera reported than an Israeli strike hit a tent in al-Katiba neighbourhood of Khan Yunis, injuring several people including women and children.
- A Palestinian man died after his house was set to fire in a settler attack.

=== 22 April ===
- The Gaza Health Ministry reported that at least 26 people were killed in Israeli attacks throughout Gaza in the past 24 hours, increasing its count of the Palestinian death toll in Gaza to 51,266.
- Gaza Civil Defence said that Israeli strikes hit Gaza City, Beit Lahia, Beit Hanoun and Khan Yunis, killing seven civilians.
- Al-Masirah reported several US air strikes in Yemen including in Sanaa, the Brash area in Sanaa Governorate, Kamaran island, Majzar district, Sirwah district and Al Abdiyah district.
- Al Jazeera reported that an Israeli strike hit a home in centre of Khan Yunis, killing nine people including two women and two children.
- Times of Israel reported that Israeli forces demolished the family house of a Palestinian militant in Al-Ram who was involved in a car ramming attack outside an IDF base in July 2024 that killed a soldier and wounded three others.
- Al Jazeera reported that an Israeli strike hit Jabalia refugee camp, killing at least five people including a woman and three children.
- Al Jazeera reported that an Israeli strike hit Deir el-Balah, killing a Palestinian doctor.
- An Israeli drone struck a car in the vicinity of Baaourta in Chouf District, killing one person. The IDF said that it killed a prominent Al-Jama’a al-Islamiyya militant who was also affiliated with Hamas in Lebanon and advanced attacks on Israel. Al-Jama’a al-Islamiyya confirmed that its leader was killed in the strike.
- Al Jazeera reported that at least 11 people died in house fires caused by Israeli air strikes.
- Times of Israel reported that Israeli forces were accused of using a 12-year-old boy to force his father to surrender. The IDF said that it was unaware of the incident.
- Al Jazeera reported that an Israeli strike hit a house in western Gaza City, killing seven people including two children.
- The IDF said that it targeted dozens of construction vehicles used by Hamas in the 7 October attacks in its strikes in Gaza.
- An Israeli drone strike in Haniyeh, Tyre District killed at least one person. The IDF said that it killed a Hezbollah commander overseeing Majdal Zoun.
- Al Jazeera reported that an Israeli strike hit a group of people in Nuseirat refugee camp, killing three civilians including two girls.
- Wafa said that Israeli settlers attacked a Palestinian man while he was driving in the vicinity of al-Auja Spring.
- Al Jazeera reported that some residents were forced by Israeli forces to evacuate from their houses in Tulkarm.
- Al-Masirah reported a wave of US air strikes in Kamaran island, two in As Salif district and as-Saleem district in Saada Governorate.
- Al Jazeera reported that Israeli strikes hit Al-Durra Children's Hospital in Tuffah and its solar panels.
- The Houthis claimed to have downed a US General Atomics MQ-9 Reaper conducting "hostile missions" over Hajjah Governorate.

=== 23 April ===
- The Gaza Health Ministry reported that at least 39 people were killed in Israeli attacks throughout Gaza in the past 24 hours, increasing its count of the Palestinian death toll in Gaza to 51,305.
- Al Jazeera reported that an Israeli strike hit a house in Jabalia for a second time, injuring two Gaza Civil Defence members attempting to evacuate victims at the site of a prior Israeli strike.
- The IDF said that air defences “probably intercepted successfully” a ballistic missile launched from Yemen at northern Israel. The Houthis said that they fired a hypersonic ballistic missile at an IDF target in Haifa and a drone at a "vital target" in Jaffa.
- Al Jazeera reported that an Israeli strike hit Jaffa school which was sheltering displaced people in Gaza City, killing at least 13 people including a child, injuring others and trapping six others under the rubble. The IDF said that it targeted Hamas and PIJ militants embedded within the school.
- Al Jazeera reported that an Israeli strike hit a tent in the Israeli-designed safe zone of al-Mawasi, killing one person and injuring five others.
- Al-Masirah reported three US strikes in Marib Governorate and four in Taiz Governorate, targeting the communications network in Maqbanah district.
- Al Jazeera reported that Israeli forces detained at least 50 Palestinians including minors and women and previously released prisoners from the West Bank in the last 24 hours.
- Al Jazeera reported that an Israeli strike hit Jabalia, killing a child and injuring several others.
- Wafa reported that Israeli forces started razing large areas of agricultural land owned by Palestinians between Kifl Haris and Haris, Salfit.
- The IDF said that it killed a Palestinian who threw explosive devices on soldiers in Al-Yamun. A 12-year-old boy was killed in the same area.

=== 24 April ===
- The Gaza Health Ministry reported that at least 50 people were killed in Israeli attacks throughout Gaza in the past 24 hours, increasing its count of the Palestinian death toll in Gaza to 51,355.
- The IDF announced a soldier of the 14th Reserve Armored Brigade's 79th Battalion was shot dead in a sniper attack in northern Gaza, increasing the IDF death toll in Gaza to 409. It also announced that three others were injured, two of them critically during fighting in north Gaza.
- Al Jazeera reported that an Israeli strike hit a tent in Deir el-Balah, killing an Al-Aqsa Voice Radio journalist, his wife and daughter.
- Al-Masirah reported more US attacks in Yemen including an attack in Zaid neighbourhood of al-Jarf al-Sharqi, north of Sanaa that damaged several houses and wounded one person, six attacks in Brash area, east of Mount Nuqum, six strikes in Sahlin area of al-Salem district and three attacks north of Saada.
- Al Jazeera reported that an Israeli strike hit a house in Sheikh Radwan, killing at least six people including a woman and four children.
- The PRCS said that five Palestinians were injured in a settler attack in Bardala. Quds News Network said that houses and farmland were also set on fire.
- Al Jazeera reported that an Israeli strike hit al-Attar, west of Khan Yunis, killing a woman and injuring several others including women and children. Another strike hit a tent in as-Sawarha, west of Nuseirat, killing three children and injuring several others.
- The Gaza Health Ministry said that Gaza is experiencing phase five of malnutrition, which is most severe per World Health Organization.
- An Israeli strike on a police station in Jabalia killed at least 10 people and injured dozens. The IDF and Shin Bet said that they targeted a Hamas and PIJ cell at a command center.
- Twenty Israeli men threw rocks towards Palestinians in Kifl Haris.
- The IDF and Shin Bet said that they arrested the head of a militant cell in Balata Camp.
- The IDF admitted that it mistakenly shelled a UN facility in central Gaza in March, killing a UN employee from Bulgaria.
- The IDF warned residents of Beit Hanoun and Sheikh Zayed neighborhoods in north Gaza to move to Gaza City, saying that sniper attacks against soldiers and other militant activities were carried out from the area.
- An Israeli strike hit a building in Al-Yarmouk Street in the center of Gaza City, killing seven people including children and wounding a child.
- Al Jazeera reported that an Israeli strike hit a house in Jabalia, killing 12 people.

=== 25 April ===
- The Gaza Health Ministry reported that at least 84 people were killed in Israeli attacks throughout Gaza in the past 24 hours, increasing its count of the Palestinian death toll in Gaza to 51,439.
- Al-Masirah reported several US attacks throughout Yemen including one strike each in As Salif district and Kamaran island, two strikes each in Bani Hushaysh district and Harf Sufyan district and four strikes in Medghal district.
- Palestinian media reported that four Palestinian prisoners released as part of the January 2025 Gaza war ceasefire were arrested by the IDF from Qalqilya.
- Al Jazeera reported than an Israeli strike hit tents in al-Mawasi, killing five people including a pregnant woman and her three children.
- The US confirmed that the Houthis downed seven General Atomics MQ-9 Reapers.
- The US military claimed that an explosion in the vicinity of the Old City of Sanaa was caused by Houthi missile, without providing evidence.
- The Israeli police released video of an arrest of an armed militant affiliated with PIJ from Qalqilya in a joint operation with the IDF and Shin Bet.
- Al Jazeera reported that a child died from injuries sustained after an Israeli strike hit a tent in al-Mawasi.
- Al-Masirah reported that at least six US air strikes hit Bajil district.
- The Gaza Government Media Office said that at least 52 people including 50 children died because of hunger and malnutrition since the start of the blockade.
- Wafa reported that an Israeli strike hit Wadi Al-Arayes Street, east of Zaytun Quarter, killing a 70-year-old man. Another strike hit Al-Qassasib area of Jabalia refugee camp, killing a woman.
- The World Food Programme said that its food stocks were depleted in Gaza.
- The Palestinian NGO Network's director said that remaining food in still operating community kitchens in Gaza will only last a few days.
- Al Jazeera reported that a 17-year-old was killed during an IDF raid in Salim, Nablus.
- The IDF said it launched an airstrike that killed Hamas militants who launched an RPG towards soldiers in Gaza City, adding that it destroyed several rocket launchers in the same area.
- The IDF announced that a reservist was critically injured and two others were slightly wounded after they were hit by explosive devices and light arms fire in Tel al-Sultan neighborhood.
- The IDF warned residents of al-Turukman, aj-Jadida, and northeastern Zeitoun Quarter areas to move to western Gaza City, saying that militant groups launched attacks from the areas.
- The IDF said that an anti-tank missile was fired at its forces in Daraj Quarter. The al-Quds Brigades said it attacked Israeli forces and vehicles in al-Muntar Hill, east of Gaza City.
- The al-Qassam Brigades claimed that it shot four Israeli soldiers in an ambush in Beit Hanoun.
- al-Masirah reported that US forces conducted four strikes in Takhiya area of Majz district.
- al-Masirah reported that a US strike hit a house east of Sahar district, killing a woman and injuring another person. US forces also carried out four strikes in Ras Isa area of As Salif district, and one strike in At Tawilah district.

=== 26 April ===
- Israel announced that a soldier of the IDF's 401st Armored Brigade’s 46th Battalion and a Yamas police officer were killed in Shuja'iyya the day prior, increasing the IDF death toll in Gaza to 411. It also announced that one soldier was moderately injured, another soldier was slightly injured and two reservists were moderately injured in the same area. At least five Hamas squads took part in the ambush, and according to the IDF, at least nine of the militants were killed.
- The IDF said that air defences intercepted a ballistic missile fired at Israel by the Houthis prior to entering Israel. The Houthis said that they targeted Nevatim Airbase.
- Al Jazeera reported that a 16-year-old Palestinian teenager was injured during an Israeli raid in Beit Fajjar.
- The IDF said that the IAF shot down a drone fired towards Israel apparently from Yemen.
- Hamas claimed that it rescued a hostage from a tunnel targeted in an Israeli airstrike several days prior.
- The IDF said that it hit 120 targets in the past 48 hours and estimated that it killed more than 400 militants, including dozens of senior Hamas political officials and mid-level al-Qassam Brigades commanders since 18 March.
- Palestinian media reported that Israeli settlers entered Kobar, opened fire, attacked houses and abducted two young residents. An Israeli security official told Ynet that the settlers carried an arrest with no authorization after Palestinians hurled rocks towards them when they entered the village. The official confirmed that settlers opened fire in the area.
- Al Jazeera reported that an Israeli strike hit a house in Sabra, Gaza, killing at least 10 people.
- Al Jazeera reported that Israeli strike hit the Israeli-designated safe zone of al-Mawasi, killing three people.

=== 27 April ===
- The Gaza Health Ministry reported that at least 51 people were killed in Israeli attacks throughout Gaza in the past 24 hours and also added at least 697 more deaths after verifying the deaths of some missing persons, increasing its count of the Palestinian death toll in Gaza to 52,243.
- Al-Masirah reported US strikes in Yemen including Ras Isa port in Al Hudaydah Governorate, the cargo vessel Galaxy Leader in Hudaydah Port, Kamaran island, Al Anan district of Al Jawf Governorate and Medghal district.
- The IDF said that a Houthi missile launched towards Israel was intercepted prior to reaching Israeli territory. The Houthis said that they targeted Nevatim Airbase with a "hypersonic ballistic missile".
- Al Jazeera reported that a child died from injuries sustained in an Israeli strike that hit tents in Khan Yunis.
- An Israeli drone strike in Halta killed at least one person. The IDF said that it killed a Hezbollah militant involved in regroupment and rearmament efforts.
- Yemen's Houthi-run Health Ministry said that US strikes in As Sabain district killed two people and injured another, while nine others including two women and three children were injured in Bani Al Harith district.
- AFP reported that an Israeli strike hit a group of civilians in Zaytun Quarter, killing three civilians.
- AFP reported that an Israeli strike hit Khuza'a, Khan Yunis, killing a 17-year-old boy.
- AFP reported that an Israeli strike hit al-Mawasi, injuring at least 12 people, mostly children.
- Wafa reported that Israeli settlers vandalized and looted a school east of Ad-Dhahiriya.
- Al Jazeera reported that an Israeli strike hit a group of civilians in Deir el-Balah, killing four.
- Al Jazeera reported that an Israeli strike hit a makeshift tent in Khan Yunis, killing three children and a woman.
- The IDF warned to evacuate at least 300 metres from a building in Beirut which is said was a Hezbollah facility. Later, an Israeli air strike was reported in southern Beirut. Israeli Prime Minister Benjamin Netanyahu and Israeli Defence Minister Israel Katz said that the IDF targeted a Hezbollah precision missile warehouse.
- The IDF said that the IAF shot down a drone fired towards Israel apparently from Yemen.
- Al Jazeera reported that Israeli settlers attacked guards and employees at a solid waste disposal site in Beit 'Anan, wounding several and seizing work equipment.
- The al-Quds Brigades said that it fired a guided missile on a building where Israeli soldiers were sheltering in Gaza City. The al-Qassam Brigades said that it targeted a tank using an anti-armor rocket and detonated an explosive device on Israeli soldiers in the same area.
- Al Jazeera reported that an Israeli strike hit a cafe in the Nuseirat refugee camp, killing six people.
- Al Mashirah reported that at least eight people including women and children were killed in US strikes in the Bani Al Harith district, north of Sanaa.
- Al Jazeera reported that an Israeli drone attack was reported in al-Majidia in the eastern sector of the Israel-Lebanon border.
- Saba News Agency reported two US strikes in Harf Sufyan district.
- The US said that it struck 800 targets in Yemen since 15 March. United States Central Command claimed that US strikes in Yemen killed hundreds of Houthi militants, and several Houthi leaders, including senior Houthi missile and UAV officials. It also claimed that US strikes depleted Houthi attack capabilities, saying that ballistic missile firing decreased by 69 percent, while drone attacks decreased by 55 percent. CentCom added that attacking Ras Isa stopped the Houthis from importing fuel via the port, affecting their revenue.
- An Israeli strike hit Az-Zawayda, killing several children including a 4-year-old girl.

=== 28 April ===
- The Gaza Health Ministry reported that at least 71 people were killed in Israeli attacks throughout Gaza in the past 24 hours, increasing its count of the Palestinian death toll in Gaza to 52,314.
- An Israeli strike hit a house in Jabalia refugee camp, killing at least 10 people including children, women and elderly men and injuring several others.
- Al-Masirah reported that two US strikes hit Saada and two strikes hit Bart Al Anan district.
- Al-Masirah reported that US strikes hit a detention centre holding African migrants in Saada Governorate, killing at least 68 people and injuring 47 others.
- Wafa reported that an elderly man was severely beaten by Israeli forces who set fire to his home in Tulkarm camp.
- Al Jazeera reported that two 13-year-old twin boys were detained by Israeli forces from Beitunia.
- The head of Iran's Infrastructure Communications Company claimed that Iran thwarted "one of the most extensive and complex cyberattacks" against Iranian infrastructure.
- Al Jazeera reported that three high school students were arrested by Israeli forces from Jaba', Jenin.
- Al Jazeera reported that a young girl and an infant girl died from wounds sustained in an Israeli strike on a tent in the vicinity of Khan Yunis.
- Wafa reported that tear gas fired by Israeli forces caused suffocation to students in Al-Khader.
- Israeli forces ordered residents to stop building three houses and caravans used for livestock raising in Al Jib.
- Al Jazeera reported that an Israeli airstrike hit Aitaroun.
- Al Jazeera reported that an Israeli strikes hit several areas west of Gaza City, killing at least seven Palestinians including two children.
- Gaza Civil Defence said that eight of its 12 ambulances ran out of fuel.
- The IDF said that it used Bar rockets for the first time to strike targets in south Gaza.
- Al Jazeera reported that an Israeli strike hit al-Ghafari Junction of central Gaza City, killing 12 Palestinians including five children. Another strike in Gaza City killed 10 people and wounded others.
- The Houthis claimed that they forced the USS Harry S. Truman and other warships to retreat to the far north of the Red Sea by firing multiple cruise and ballistic missiles and drones. US Navy said that an F18 Super Hornet and a tow tractor fell from the Truman in the Red Sea, injuring a sailor. A US official said that initial reports indicated that the ship made a hard turn to evade Houthi attacks, contributing to the aircraft's fall.
- UN said that 16 community kitchens closed in Gaza over the weekend after they ran out of supplies.
- The IDF said that in the last month it hit over 50 targets in Lebanon for violating the ceasefire and threatening civilians in Israel.

=== 29 April ===
- The Gaza Health Ministry reported that at least 50 people were killed in Israeli attacks throughout Gaza in the past 24 hours, increasing its count of the Palestinian death toll in Gaza to 52,365.
- An Israeli strike hit tents for displaced Palestinians in Al-Iqlimiya area, south of al-Mawasi area of Khan Yunis, killing four people, including three children and wounded over 30 others.
- Al Jazeera reported that Israeli forces demolished a two-storey house sheltering 13 Palestinians with bulldozers and armoured personnel carriers in Zweidin area of Masafer Yatta.
- Al Jazeera reported that a doctor and a journalist were detained by Israeli forces from the West Bank. The IDF said it suspects the journalist of transferring funds to PIJ. The journalist's family denied the accusation.
- Far-right Israeli National Security Minister Itamar Ben Gvir ordered the closure of the Jerusalem Fund and Endowment in East Jerusalem.
- The IDF and Shin Bet said that they killed a Hamas militant from the Nukhba forces in the Deir el-Balah Brigade who commanded the infiltration of Kissufim during the 7 October attacks and another Hamas militant who was the chief of operations in its Jabalia Brigade and directed attacks targeting Israeli forces in Gaza. It also said that it killed a PFLP militant who was in contact with militants in the West Bank and transferred millions of shekels for the attacks in a separate strike in Gaza City six days prior.
- The IDF said that it arrested 25 Palestinians as part of a military operation carried out by Israeli forces throughout the West Bank, adding that it found weapons and tens of thousands of shekels in militant funds.
- AFP reported that a Palestinian paramedic detained during Rafah ambulance attack was released by Israeli forces.
- UNOCHA said that almost 10,000 cases of child acute malnutrition were recorded throughout Gaza, among them 1,600 cases of severe acute malnutrition since the beginning of 2025. The Gaza Health Ministry said that at least 60,000 children were now showing malnutrition symptoms.
- Al Jazeera reported that an Israeli strike hit Ain Jalut towers in the Nuseirat refugee camp, killing two people including a child.
- The IDF said that the IAF shot down a drone fired apparently from Yemen towards Israel prior to entering Israeli territory.
- Al-Mashirah reported that US airstrikes targeted Bani Matar district, Bani Hushaysh district and Al Hasan, Yemen.
- Al Jazeera reported that a woman died from injuries sustained after being shot by Israeli forces in At-Tira (Ramallah).

=== 30 April ===
- The Gaza Health Ministry reported that at least 35 people were killed in Israeli attacks throughout Gaza in the past 24 hours, increasing its count of the Palestinian death toll in Gaza to 52,400.
- Al Jazeera reported that an Israeli strike hit Nuseirat refugee camp, killing at least three people including a child.
- The UK Defense Ministry said that British forces took part in a joint operation with US forces against a Houthi target in Yemen.
- The Pentagon claimed that the US struck over 1,000 targets, killing Houthi militants, leaders, including senior Houthi missile and UAV officials and reducing their capabilities.
- Al Jazeera reported that an Israeli strike hit Gaza City, killing a fisherman while pulling his boat to the water.
- Wafa reported that a 13-year-old boy was injured during an Israeli raid in Al-Yamun.
- The al-Qassam Brigades said that it fought Israeli forces east of Beit Hanoun.
- Al Jazeera reported clashes between Israeli forces and Palestinian militants during an Israeli raid in Beita, Nablus. The IDF announced that two reservists were injured, one of them critically in a roadside bombing in the vicinity of Beita.
- A security official said that the Lebanese Army dismantled more than 90% of Hezbollah infrastructure south of the Litani river.
- The Houthis said that they targeted the US aircraft carrier USS Carl Vinson using drones and attacked “vital and military” sites in Tel Aviv.
- Al Jazeera reported that Israeli settlers set fire to olive trees and stabbed a 27-year-old resident in Duma, Nablus.

== May ==
=== 1 May ===
- The Gaza Health Ministry reported that at least 18 people were killed in Israeli attacks throughout Gaza in the past 24 hours, increasing its count of the Palestinian death toll in Gaza to 52,418.
- Wafa reported that Israeli settlers vandalised property belonging to a Palestinian family and stole their cattle in the vicinity of Hamra IDF checkpoint in the north Jordan Valley.
- Al Jazeera reported that an Israeli strike hit the Israeli-designated humanitarian zone of al-Mawasi, killing three people. Another young girl died from the injuries sustained in a previous Israeli strike that hit Khan Yunis.
- Al Jazeera reported that an Israeli strike hit a residential area in Beit Lahia, killing three people and seriously wounded others. Another strike hit eastern Khan Yunis, killing three farmers.
- Al Jazeera reported that three people including two Syrians and one Lebanese were killed in an Israeli airstrike on a vehicle in Mais al-Jabal, southern Lebanon. The IDF said it launched two strikes that killed a Radwan Force militant and a militant conducting surveillance operations along the border.
- Al Jazeera reported that an Israeli strike hit a tent in Deir el-Balah, killing one civilian and injuring others.
- Al Jazeera reported that an Israeli strike hit Shuja'iyya, killing two people including a child.
- The Gaza Health Ministry said that severe malnutrition affected 92% of Gaza's children and breastfeeding mothers.
- Al Jazeera reported that an Israeli strike hit Jabalia refugee camp, killing a child and injuring two others.
- The IDF said that a soldier was mistakenly left alone for 40 minutes in Gaza, describing it as a "grave incident".
- Al Jazeera reported that Israeli forces ordered residents of 106 houses in Tulkarm camp and Nur Shams to evacuate prior to their demolitions.

=== 2 May ===
- al-Qassam Brigades claimed that it inflicted casualties on Israeli forces by hitting four Hummer vehicles and an IDF truck in at-Tarayan Street of Tel al-Sultan neighborhood some days prior.
- The IDF said that it intercepted a ballistic missile fired by Houthis prior to entering Israel. Debris from the missile damaged the roof of a kindergarten in Mishmar HaEmek. Houthis said that they targeted Ramat David Airbase.
- An alleged Israeli drone attack hit the Freedom Flotilla Coalition's Gaza-bound aid ship off the coast of Malta, causing a fire. The group later said that vessel cannot move because of fear of sinking. Malta government later said that crew members and civilian passengers were confirmed safe.
- Al Jazeera reported that an Israeli strike hit Qizan an-Najjar, killing a Palestinian child. Another Palestinian died from injuries sustained in a previous strike on tents in Al-Mawasi.
- An Israeli strike hit a home in Sheikh Radwan, killing two civilians and injuring others. Another strike hit a house in Bureij, killing nine people including at least two women.
- The IDF said that it intercepted a ballistic missile fired towards Israel by the Houthis, who claimed that their hypersonic missiles hit a "vital" target in Haifa.
- The IDF said that it killed the head of a militant network in Nablus.
- An Israeli strike hit as-Sikka street of Shuja'iyya, killing two people including a boy and injured boy's grandfather.
- An Israeli strike hit a residential building in Jabalia, killing several civilians including children.
- Al-Mashirah reported seven US strikes in Ras Issa oil port of As Salif district.
- The IDF said that the IAF shot down a drone fired towards Israel apparently from Yemen.
- Witnesses said that several Palestinians were killed and injured when hundreds of people tried to break into an UNRWA warehouses in Gaza City.

=== 3 May ===
- The Gaza Health Ministry reported that at least 70 people were killed in Israeli attacks throughout Gaza in the past 48 hours, increasing its count of the Palestinian death toll in Gaza to 52,495.
- The IDF said that it downed a missile fired from Yemen. Houthis said that they targeted an IDF base south of Tel Aviv.
- Al Jazeera reported that an infant girl died because of malnutrition and dehydration in Al-Rantisi Hospital.
- AFP reported that an Israeli strike hit a house in Khan Yunis refugee camp, killing 11 people, including three infants.
- Al Jazeera reported that an Israeli strike on a group of people in western Khan Yunis killed a woman.
- Al Jazeera reported that an Israeli strike hit a tent in al-Mawasi evacuation zone, killing an infant.
- The Gaza Government Media Office said that its count of deaths because of malnutrition in Gaza since Israeli total blockade increased to 57, most of them children, ill and elderly people.
- Al Jazeera reported that an Israeli strike hit a home in Al-Fukhari, killing two women.
- Al Jazeera reported that an Israeli strike hit off the coast Gaza City killed a fishermen and wounded another.
- Al Jazeera reported that an Israeli firing injured a 13-year-old boy in Zababdeh.
- Al Jazeera reported that Palestinian journalists were harassed by Israeli settlers in the vicinity of Al-Mughayyir, Ramallah.
- Saba News Agency reported that the US conducted overnight strikes on Sanaa, Bani Hushaysh district and Khabb wa ash Sha'af district.
- NNA reported an Israeli air strike on a vehicle in Khartoum, Lebanon.
- The IDF said that the IAF intercepted a drone fired towards Israel apparently from Yemen above the Egypt border area.
- The IDF said that it arrested two Palestinians suspected of inciting violence and arson from the West Bank overnight.
- Al-Masirah reported two US air strikes on Kamaran island and As Salif district.
- Al Jazeera reported that three children were detained during an Israeli raid in Azzun.

=== 4 May ===
- The Gaza Health Ministry reported that at least 40 people were killed in Israeli attacks throughout Gaza in the past 24 hours, increasing its count of the Palestinian death toll in Gaza to 52,535.
- UNICEF said that over 9,000 Palestinian children were treated for acute malnutrition since the beginning of 2025.
- Al Jazeera reported that a Palestinian woman and child were wounded during an Israeli raid in Jericho.
- Al-Masirah reported US strikes throughout Yemen including 10 air attacks on Al Hazm district and five air attacks on Majzar district, Marib Governorate.
- The IDF announced that two soldiers of the Yahalom unit were killed and two others were injured, one of them critically in a booby-trapped tunnel in Rafah. It also announced that another reservist was critically injured in another incident in north Gaza the previous day, increasing the IDF death toll in Gaza to 413. It added that two soldiers were injured in an explosion in an IDF encampment in the area of Daraj Quarter and Tuffah one day prior. Per an initial IDF probe, the explosion was apparently caused by a tank shell which prematurely detonated when it was being launched.
- A ballistic missile launched by the Houthis hit a grove near an access road within the perimeter of Ben Gurion Airport, injuring six people. Magen David Adom said that two others were treated due to acute anxiety. The Houthis said that they launched a “hypersonic ballistic missile".
- Al Jazeera reported that Israeli forces arrested Palestinian workers travelling to their workplaces in Jerusalem and seized a vehicle.
- Al Jazeera reported that two children were detained by Israeli forces from Beit Ummar.
- The IDF said that the IAF struck more than 100 targets in Gaza in the weekend including militant cells, tunnel infrastructure and buildings used by militant groups.
- Wafa reported that an Israeli strike hit a house in Nuseirat refugee camp, killing two people including one woman and injuring others.
- Wafa reported that another Israeli strike hit a tent in al-Mawasi, killing 10 civilians including six women and a child.
- The IDF said that it found a cache of weapons in the vicinity of a hospital and a school in Rafah.
- Hamas handed over one of its militants suspected of launching rockets towards Israel from Lebanon in March 2025 to the Lebanese Army.
- Palestinian Prisoner's Society (PPS) reported that a 60-year-old Palestinian from Jenin died in Israeli custody in the Negev prison.
- Hamas said that it executed six Palestinians for looting food, accusing some of them of Israeli collaboration.
- Al Jazeera reported that a 14-year-old was wounded during an Israeli raid in Nablus.
- The al-Qassam Brigades claimed that it inflicted casualties on Israeli forces in an ambush in Rafah and in a bomb attack in Jnaina neighbourhood of Rafah.
- AFP reported that overnight Israeli strikes in Khan Yunis Governorate killed six people including a 2-year-old boy and a 5-year-old boy.
- The Houthis announced a complete "aerial blockade" on Israel.
- Gaza Civil Defence said that Israeli quadcopters opened fire at them while attempting to reach a home bombed by Israeli forces.

=== 5 May ===
- The Gaza Health Ministry reported that at least 32 people were killed in Israeli attacks throughout Gaza in the past 24 hours, increasing its count of the Palestinian death toll in Gaza to 52,567.
- An Israeli strike on three apartments in the Al-Rumuz tower in the al-Karama area of Gaza City, killed 15 people and wounded 10 others.
- Saba News Agency reported reported 10 US strikes in and around Sanaa including two targeting Arbaeen Street in Sanaa and one on the airport road. The Houthi Health Ministry said that 16 people were injured.
- Al-Masirah reported three US air strikes in Khabb wa ash Sha'af district, two strikes on Sanaa's Attan area and two on Raghwan district.
- The al-Qassam Brigades claimed that it destroyed two IDF tanks and an IDF bulldozer using Al-Yassin 105 in al-Faraheen area east of Khan Yunis. It also claimed that it inflicted casualties on an IDF “infantry engineering force” using an antipersonnel missile and machine guns.
- An Israeli strike hit Shujayea, killing a child and injuring several others.
- A four-month-old infant died due to malnutrition in Gaza.
- The Lebanese Army said that Hamas handed over a second militant suspected of firing rockets towards Israel in March 2025.
- An IDF investigation found that two soldiers wounded in Gaza City two days prior were likely hit by Hamas rocket fire rather than a malfunctioning tank shell.
- The IDF said that an airstrike in Khan Yunis one day prior destroyed a primed Hamas rocket firing position.
- Al-Masirah reported 10 US air strikes in Al Hazm, Yemen and two strikes in Sanhan and Bani Bahlul district.
- The IDF said that it carried out airstrikes in Yemen in a response to the Houthi missile attack on Ben Gurion Airport one day prior and previous attacks. The strikes conducted by IAF fighter jets targeted Houthi infrastructure along the Yemeni coast, including Hudaydah Port, and a concrete factory in Bajil, saying that they were used for militant purposes. Al-Masirah reported that an Israeli attacks killed four people and injured at least 39 others.
- Lebanese media reported that Israeli airstrikes hit Janta area of Beqaa Valley. The IDF said that it targeted infrastructure at a Hezbollah “strategic weapons” production and storage site in the Beqaa Valley after identifying Hezbollah's work to restore the facility, which was targeted in the past. It also said that it attacked several more Hezbollah targets in Srifa.
- Al-Masirah reported that US airstrikes hit Ras Isa oil port in Hodeidah and Al-Sawad in Sanaa Governorate.
- An Israeli strike hit Nuseirat, killing a 14-year-old Palestinian singer.

=== 6 May ===
- The Gaza Health Ministry reported that at least 48 people were killed in Israeli attacks throughout Gaza in the past 24 hours, increasing its count of the Palestinian death toll in Gaza to 52,615.
- An Israeli strike hit a tent in al-Mawasi, killing at least one child and wounding others.
- Al Jazeera reported that a child died from injuries sustained in an Israeli strike on a house in Khan Yunis.
- Wafa reported that three civilians were beaten by Israeli forces during a raid in Abwein.
- The IDF said that it captured a commander of a Hamas platoon and a sniper commander in Rafah several weeks prior and accused one of them of participating in the 7 October attacks. It also said that one of them held hostages. It added that Shin Bet interrogated those two Hamas militants and gained the location of a significant militant infrastructure in the area.
- The IDF warned people to evacuate from Sanaa International Airport area. Later, it said that it struck several targets in Yemen, including "completely disabling" the airport and several major power stations in the Sanaa area and the al-Imran concrete factory north of Sanaa, saying that they were used for militant purposes. Al-Masirah reported that three people were killed and 38 others were injured. An airport official said that Sanaa International Airport was "completely destroyed" in the strike.
- Al Jazeera reported that an Israeli strike hit a school sheltering displaced people in Bureij refugee camp, killing at least 33 people including women and children and injuring dozens. The IDF said that it targeted a Hamas militant cell at a command center in central Gaza. Residents said that the IDF warned to evacuate a mosque in the area, but its strike hit the school in its vicinity.
- Turkish media outlets reported that Turkish intelligence foiled a second pager attack in Lebanon.
- US president Donald Trump said that US strikes in Yemen will stop, saying that the Houthis told his administration that they will stop their attacks against ships in Red Sea. Oman said that it mediated a ceasefire between Washington and the Houthis. The Houthis emphasized that the ceasefire did not in "any way, shape, or form" apply to Israel.
- NNA reported that an Israeli strike hit car in Kfar Reman killed one person and injured three others.
- The IDF said that it killed a Hezbollah commander in a drone attack in Nabatieh.

=== 7 May ===
- The Gaza Health Ministry reported that at least 38 people were killed in Israeli attacks throughout Gaza in the past 24 hours, increasing its count of the Palestinian death toll in Gaza to 52,653.
- A Hamas militant was killed in an Israeli drone strike in Sidon. The IDF said that he was Hamas's western sector's chief of operations in Lebanon. Hamas confirmed that he was killed.
- Al Jazeera reported that an Israeli strike hit a tent shelter in Deir el-Balah, killing three people including a child.
- Al Jazeera reported that an Israeli strike hit a home in Bani Suheila, killing two people including a woman.
- The IDF said that the IAF intercepted a drone apparently fired from Yemen towards Israel.
- Gaza medics said that an Israeli strike hit al-Karama School in Tuffah, killing 15 people including a journalist and several others were wounded.
- Al Jazeera reported that an Israeli strike hit a house in Khan Yunis, killing eight people including children.
- The IDF said that a ballistic missile fired from Yemen fell outside Israeli territory.
- Greece said that it supported the Arab-supported Gaza reconstruction plan.
- Gaza health authorities said that an Israeli strike in the vicinity of a restaurant and market in the Gaza City, killing 33 people including children and women.
- al-Qassam Brigades claimed that it caused casualties on an IDF armored force east of Khan Yunis by detonating a minefield and mortar rounds.
- The Gaza Government Media Office said that a second journalist was killed in the attacks.
- The IDF said that Palestinian militant opened fire on soldiers operating in the vicinity of the Reihan checkpoint in the north West Bank, critically injuring two reservists.
- The IDF said that a Palestinian militant tried to ram soldiers in the vicinity of Hebron using his car, prior to getting out and stabbing personnel, moderately injuring one person. It also said that the attacker was shot and critically wounded.
- The IDF said that a soldier from the Golani Brigade's reconnaissance unit was critically injured and another Golani soldier and two others from Oketz canine unit were moderately injured during combat. Per an initial IDF investigation, the soldiers were hit by an explosive device while operating in Rafah.
- World Central Kitchen said that it halted its operations in Gaza after running out of supplies.
- The Houthis said that they targeted Ramon Airport and a vital Israeli target in Jaffa with drones, adding that they conducted attacks on the USS Harry S. Truman before Trump's announcement of an end to US attacks in Yemen.
- Palestinian media reported that Israeli settlers set fire to a farmhouse in Khirbet Abu Falah.

=== 8 May ===
- The Gaza Health Ministry reported that at least 106 people were killed in Israeli attacks throughout Gaza in the past 24 hours, increasing its count of the Palestinian death toll in Gaza to 52,760.
- Israeli security forces said that they arrested a Palestinian from a house in Barta'a suspected of conducting a shooting which critically injured two reservists.
- Fourteen Israeli strikes were reported in Nabatieh area. The IDF said that it targeted a Hezbollah infrastructure site, targeting militants, weapons and tunnel shafts. One person was killed and eight others were injured.
- Al Jazeera reported that an Israeli strike hit a house in Beit Lahia, killing nine members of the same family including women and children and leaving others missing or trapped.
- Al Jazeera reported that an Israeli strike hit tents in western Khan Yunis, killing one girl and injuring four others.
- Israeli security forces said that they killed a wanted Palestinian militant in Nablus. The Palestinian health ministry said that a 30-year-old Palestinian was killed during clashes with Israeli forces in the area.
- Hamas said that it fought Israeli forces in the vicinity of Rafah.
- The IDF said that it struck more than 150 targets in Gaza in last 72 hours including militant cells, buildings used by militant groups, and other infrastructure. It also said that it killed a Hamas rocket production unit commander in a drone strike in Deir al-Balah one day prior.
- The IDF and Shin Bet announced that they killed a Hamas militant who participated in kidnapping an Israeli hostage during the 7 October attacks in an airstrike in Gaza City one day prior.
- The IDF said that an Israeli infant was slightly injured aboard a bus in the Jordan Valley which was targeted in a stone-hurling attack.
- The Arab48 website reported that an Israeli strike hit Rafah, killing an Arab man deported from Israel to Gaza.

=== 9 May ===
- The Gaza Health Ministry reported that at least 27 people were killed in Israeli attacks throughout Gaza in the past 24 hours, increasing its count of the Palestinian death toll in Gaza to 52,787.
- The IDF said that two soldiers of the Combat Engineering Corps were killed and six others were injured in combat in south Gaza, increasing the IDF death toll in Gaza to 415.
- The IDF said that it struck more than 60 targets in Gaza in last day, including militant cells, buildings used by militant groups, weapon depots and other infrastructure. It also said that dozens of additional overnight strikes were conducted by the IAF against Hamas targets in Morag Corridor. It added that a drone strike one day prior killed a militant who emerged from a tunnel in the vicinity of where its ground forces were operating and another strike struck a building from which its soldiers came under fire in Gaza.
- The New Arab reported that an Israeli strike hit a house in Nuseirat refugee camp, killing three family members including an infant and injuring six others.
- The IDF said that it shot and detained a Palestinian suspected of planning to conduct an attack from his home in Tammun the previous day.
- The IDF said that air defenses downed a ballistic missile fired by the Houthis, who said that they targeted Ben Gurion Airport and launched a drone at a target in the Tel Aviv area.
- Israeli security forces said that they arrested 55 wanted people and seized weapons from the West Bank in the past week.
- The IDF said that it destroyed a major Hamas underground infrastructure in Shaboura camp in Rafah after obtaining its location from captured militants.
- The IDF said that it killed a "most wanted" militant who was planning imminent attacks during its operation in Nablus. Video published by Palestinian media showed that he raised his hand in the air when he was shot.
- Palestinian media reported that an Israeli strike hit a UNRWA aid supply center in Jabalia, killing several people. The IDF said that it targeted several Hamas militants.
- Wafa reported that agricultural land owned by Al-Mughayyir residents were set to fire by settlers.

=== 10 May ===
- The Gaza Health Ministry reported that at least 23 people were killed in Israeli attacks throughout Gaza in the past 24 hours, increasing its count of the Palestinian death toll in Gaza to 52,810.
- The IDF announced that nine troops, including two senior officers were slightly injured by an explosive device in Shuja'iyya.
- An Israeli strike hit a tent in Sabra, Gaza, killing five family members including a woman and her three children.
- The IDF said that it destroyed dozens of militant infrastructures, found dozens of tunnel shafts, killed dozens of militants in Jenina neighborhood.
- An Israeli hit al-Mawasi humanitarian zone, killing two civilians.
- The IDF said that the IAF struck almost 60 militant targets throughout Gaza. It also said that it killed two militants who approached its forces in north Gaza, struck a booby-trapped building in Morag Corridor and destroyed Hamas infrastructure in Rafah.

=== 11 May ===
- The Gaza Health Ministry reported that at least 19 people were killed in Israeli attacks throughout Gaza in the past 24 hours, increasing its count of the Palestinian death toll in Gaza to 52,829.
- AP reported that two Israeli attacks hit tents in Khan Yunis, killing eight people including four children and two women.
- AP reported that an Israeli strike hit Zeitoun neighborhood of Gaza City, killing two people including a child.
- Al Jazeera reported that an Israeli strike hit a house in Zeitoun neighborhood, killing children and women.
- Lebanese TV station Al Jadeed reported that Israeli fire injured two people in Maroun al-Ras.
- Lebanese media outlet Al Mayadeen reported that Israeli forces conducted an airstrike in an open area in the vicinity of Ayta ash-Shaab apparently to prevent residents from approaching the area.
- The IDF said that the IAF struck more than 50 targets in Gaza in the last day including militant cells and buildings used by militant groups to plan and conduct attacks. It also said that ground forces targeted a Hamas command center, weapons caches, and sniper positions.
- The IDF said that the Nahal Brigade ended an operation in the West Bank, arrested more than 100 wanted individuals, killed several militants and seized dozens of weapons.
- The IDF issued evacuation warnings on three ports controlled by the Houthis in Yemen, saying the Houthis use the ports for militant activities.
- Israel recovered the body of Zvi Feldman, a missing in action soldier who was killed in 1982 in Lebanon, and held in Syria since.

=== 12 May ===
- The Gaza Health Ministry reported that at least 29 people were killed in Israeli attacks throughout Gaza in the past 24 hours, increasing its count of the Palestinian death toll in Gaza to 52,862.
- Al Jazeera reported that two Israeli attacks hit UNRWA's Fatima Bint Asad School serving as shelter in Jabalia refugee camp, killing at least 17 people, including children and women.
- Al Jazeera reported that an Israeli strike hit Hammad al-Hasnat mosque in Nuseirat refugee camp, killing a child.
- Al Jazeera reported that a 16-year-old was arrested by Israeli forces from Bethlehem.
- The IDF said that one reservist was slightly wounded during a firefight with Palestinian militants in Shuja'iyya.
- UNIFIL said that it uncovered over 225 Hezbollah weapons caches since the beginning of the ceasefire.
- US-Israeli hostage Edan Alexander was released by Hamas.
- al-Qassam Brigades claimed that two Israeli troops were killed and others were wounded in a gun battle with it inside a home on al-Nazzaz Street, east of Shuja'iyya.

=== 13 May ===
- The Gaza Health Ministry reported that at least 46 people were killed in Israeli attacks throughout Gaza in the past 24 hours, increasing its count of the Palestinian death toll in Gaza to 52,908.
- An Israeli strike hit the burns department of Nasser Hospital, killing two people and wounded 12 others including one seriously. The IDF said that it targeted a Hamas command and control complex in the hospital that was used by a militant who replaced Ismail Barhoum as a member of Hamas’ political bureau. Those killed included Hassan Eslaiah, a journalist. The Gaza Interior Ministry confirmed that the second person among those killed was a senior police commander.
- An Israeli drone hit a motorcycle in the vicinity of Houla, Lebanon, killing one person. The IDF said that it targeted a Hezbollah militant.
- The al-Qassam Brigades claimed that it inflicted casualties on an Israeli soldier two days prior in Shuja'iyya.
- The IDF said that it hit a Hezbollah militant in Beaufort.
- Wafa reported that dozens of olive trees and large areas of Palestinian agricultural lands were bulldozed by Israeli forces in Madama, Nablus.
- Al Jazeera reported that an Israeli strike hit Khan Yunis, killing two people including a woman and injuring several others.
- An Israeli strike hit the Gaza European Hospital, killing at least 26 people and wounded others including patients who were heading to the hospital for receiving medical treatment. The IDF and Shin Bet said that they carried out a "precise" strike on an underground command center targeting Hamas militants, including Hamas leader Mohammed Sinwar. Gaza Civil Defence said that an Israeli strike targeted the same area in south Khan Yunis for second time while conducting a rescue mission for people injured in the earlier strike, moderately injuring two of its members. The IDF claimed that the strike destroyed the alleged command center,
- The IDF said that it downed a ballistic missile fired towards Israel by the Houthis, who said that their hypersonic missile targeted Ben Gurion Airport. Two people were wounded while running to shelter. An Israeli defence source said that another ballistic missile fired from Yemen fell far from Israel.
- The IDF said that it downed two rockets fired from Gaza towards south Israel while a third rocket hit an open area. The al-Quds Brigades said that it launched the rockets. The IDF warned residents to evacuate from several neighborhoods in north Gaza including Jabalia, saying that rockets were fired from the area.
- Two Israeli settler attacks wounded three Palestinians in the southern West Bank.
- NNA reported that an Israeli strike targeted a vehicle in Shaqra, Lebanon.
- NNA reported that unexploded ordnance left behind by Israeli forces killed one person and injured another in a south Lebanon road connecting two small towns.
- Al Jazeera reported about clashes between residents and Israeli forces in Ya'bad.

=== 14 May ===
- The Gaza Health Ministry reported that at least 20 people were killed in Israeli attacks throughout Gaza in the past 24 hours, increasing its count of the Palestinian death toll in Gaza to 52,928.
- The IDF said that it destroyed a bomb-producing factory in Tulkarm.
- The IDF said that air defences downed a ballistic missile fired towards Israel by the Houthis.
- NNA reported that an Israeli drone hit a vehicle at the entrance to Wadi al-Hujeir in the vicinity of Qaaqaait al-Jisr, killing one person. The IDF said that a Hezbollah commander was killed in the strike.
- NNA reported that an Israeli drone crashed in Shebaa because of a technical malfunction, causing an explosion that damaged a home and inflicted "material losses".
- Al Jazeera reported that a 17-year-old Palestinian teenager was injured during clashes in Abwein.
- The IDF issued evacuation warnings in Ras Isa, Hudaydah and Salif ports in Yemen.
- Gaza hospitals and health officials reported that at least 84 people, including at least 22 children and at least 15 women were killed in Israeli strikes in Gaza. The IDF said that its overnight strikes targeted Hamas and PIJ militants in north Gaza.
- The IDF warned Palestinians to evacuate from Al-Shifa Hospital and several schools in Rimal neighborhood of Gaza City, accusing Hamas of operating in the area.
- UNIFIL said that Israeli fire hit the perimeter of one of its bases in Kfar Shouba.
- A Palestinian militant opened fire on Israeli motorists in the vicinity of Brukhin, killing a pregnant woman and slightly injuring a man.

=== 15 May ===
- The IDF said that it found weapons in Tubas and Barta'a.
- At least 143 Palestinians including women and children were killed in Israeli strikes on Gaza.
- The IDF said that it killed at least five Palestinian militants during an operation in Tammun. PIJ confirmed the death of its five militants.
- An Israeli drone hit a vehicle in south Lebanon. The IDF said that it killed a Hezbollah militant in Arnoun and accused him of involvement in restoring a Hezbollah infrastructure in the area.
- The IDF and Shin Bet said that they killed a Hamas militant responsible for raising funds for the al-Qassam Brigades in an airstrike the previous week. The IDF also said that in the past two days it struck more than 130 militant targets including rocket launchers, cells, and buildings used to plan attacks against its forces in Gaza, and killed several militants and destroyed Hamas infrastructure during ground operations in Gaza.
- The IDF said that in northern Gaza it destroyed an explosive-rigged structure and a perimeter used by militants to ambush Israeli forces.
- The IDF said that it downed a ballistic missile fired towards Israel by the Houthis who said that they targeted Ben Gurion Airport.
- Al Jazeera reported that Israeli settlers set fire to vehicles belonging to Palestinians in Bruqin. Settlers also burned a vehicle in Ramin Plain, east of Tulkarm, and attacked Masoudiya water well, northwest of Nablus and set fire to a guard's vehicle.
