= Jabal Bura =

Mountain in Yemen

Coordinates: 14°57′04″N 43°29′51″E

Jabal Bura (Arabic: جبل بُرع, romanized: Jabal Buraʽ) is a granite mountain located in Bura east of Bajil, Yemen. The area is under consideration for inscription in UNESCO's list of sites that have "outstanding universal value."

== World Heritage status ==
This site was added to the UNESCO World Heritage Tentative List on 08/07/2002, in the mixed (cultural and natural) category.
