= Al-Sukhnah =

Al-Sukhnah (Arabic: السخنة) may refer to:

- Al-Sukhnah, Jordan
- Al-Sukhnah, Syria
- As Sukhnah District in Yemen
