= Al Mighlaf district =

Al Mighlaf District
- District
- Location in Yemen
- Coordinates: 15°20′N 43°20′E
- Country: Yemen
- Governorate: Al Hudaydah

Population (2003)
  - Total: 39,436
- Time zone: UTC+3 (Yemen Standard Time)

Al Mighlaf District is a district of the Al Hudaydah Governorate, Yemen. As of 2003, the district had a population of 39,436 inhabitants.
