= Bayt al-Faqih district =

Coordinates: 14°20′N 43°05′E

Bayt al-Faqih District
- District
- Interactive map of Bayt al-Faqih District
- Country: Yemen
- Governorate: Al Hudaydah

Population (2003)
  - Total: 241,300
- Time zone: UTC+3 (Yemen Standard Time)

Bayt al-Faqih District is a district of the Al Hudaydah Governorate, Yemen. As of 2003, the district had a population of 241,300 inhabitants.
