= Al Hali district =

- District
- Location in Yemen
- Coordinates: 14.8247°N 43.0014°E
- Country: Yemen
- Governorate: Al Hudaydah

Population (2003)
  - Total: 168,071
- Time zone: UTC+3 (Yemen Standard Time)

Al Hali district is a district of the Al Hudaydah Governorate, Yemen. As of 2003, the district had a population of 168,071 inhabitants.
