= Ad Durayhimi district =

Coordinates: 14°30′N 43°10′E

Ad Durayhimi district مديرية الدريهمي
- District
- Interactive map of Ad Durayhimi district
- Country: Yemen
- Governorate: Al Hudaydah

Population (2003)
  - Total: 55,013
- Time zone: UTC+3 (Yemen Standard Time)

Ad Durayhimi district (Arabic: مديرية الدريهمي) is a district of the Al Hudaydah Governorate, Yemen. As of 2003, the district had a population of 55,013 inhabitants.
