= Al Qanawis district =

Al Qanawis District
- District
- Location in Yemen
- Coordinates: 15°25′N 43°05′E
- Country: Yemen
- Governorate: Al Hudaydah

Population (2003)
  - Total: 72,336
- Time zone: UTC+3 (Yemen Standard Time)

Al Qanawis District is a district of the Al Hudaydah Governorate, Yemen. As of 2003, the district had a population of 72,336 inhabitants.
