= Az Zuhrah district =

Coordinates: 15°40′N 43°15′E

Az Zuhrah District
- District
- Interactive map of Az Zuhrah District
- Country: Yemen
- Governorate: Al Hudaydah

Population (2003)
  - Total: 138,045
- Time zone: UTC+3 (Yemen Standard Time)

Az Zuhrah District is a district of the Al Hudaydah Governorate, Yemen. As of 2003, the district had a population of 138,045 inhabitants.
