= Kamaran district =

Coordinates: 15.3603°N 42.5853°E

Kamaran District
- District
- Interactive map of Kamaran District
- Country: Yemen
- Governorate: Al Hudaydah

Population (2003)
  - Total: 2,465
- Time zone: UTC+3 (Yemen Standard Time)

Kamaran District is a district of the Al Hudaydah Governorate, Yemen. As of 2003, the district had a population of 2,465 inhabitants.
