= Al Hawak district =

- District
- Location in Yemen
- Coordinates: 14°32′N 43°10′E
- Country: Yemen
- Governorate: Al Hudaydah

Population (2003)
  - Total: 155,369
- Time zone: UTC+3 (Yemen Standard Time)

Al Hawak district is a district of the Al Hudaydah Governorate, Yemen. As of 2003, the district had a population of 155,369 inhabitants.
