= Alluheyah district =

Coordinates: 15.6361°N 42.8714°E

Alluheyah District
- District
- Interactive map of Alluheyah District
- Country: Yemen
- Governorate: Al Hudaydah

Population (2003)
  - Total: 105,682
- Time zone: UTC+3 (Yemen Standard Time)

Alluheyah District is a district of the Al Hudaydah Governorate, Yemen. As of 2003, the district had a population of 105,682 inhabitants.
