= Jabal Ra's district =

Coordinates: 14°00′N 43°28′E

Jabal Ra's District
- District
- Interactive map of Jabal Ra's District
- Country: Yemen
- Governorate: Al Hudaydah

Population (2003)
  - Total: 44,674
- Time zone: UTC+3 (Yemen Standard Time)

Jabal Ra's District is a district of the Al Hudaydah Governorate, Yemen. As of 2003, the district had a population of 44,674 inhabitants.
