= Al Munirah district =

Al Munirah District
- District
- Location in Yemen
- Coordinates: 15°07′N 43°03′E
- Country: Yemen
- Governorate: Al Hudaydah

Population (2003)
  - Total: 37,183
- Time zone: UTC+3 (Yemen Standard Time)

Al Munirah District is a district of the Al Hudaydah Governorate, Yemen. As of 2003, the district had a population of 37,183 inhabitants.
