= Hodeidah Governorate =

Governorate of Yemen

Coordinates: 14°46′N 43°15′E

Hodeidah محافظة الْحُدَيْدَة
- Governorate
- Country: Yemen
- Region: Tihamah
- Seat: Hodeidah

Area
  - Total: 13,300 km^{2} (5,100 sq mi)

Population (2017)
  - Total: 3,098,000
  - Density: 233/km^{2} (603/sq mi)

Hodeidah (Arabic: الْحُدَيْدَة, romanized: Al Ḥudaida) is a governorate of Yemen. Situated along the Red Sea coast, it is spread over an area of 13,300 km^{2} (5,100 sq mi). Its administrative centre is the port city of Hodeidah. It had an estimated population of 3.1 million in 2017.

== History ==
The town of Zabid developed in the early Middle Ages and became an important centre of Islamic learning. It served as the capital of Yemen between the 13th to the 15th centuries. It was declared as a World Heritage Site by UNESCO in 1993. The city of Hodeidah, historically known as Ḥārat al-Sūr ("The Walled Quarter"), was an important trading center on the Red Sea coast during the Ottoman period. Its historic market flourished due to trade in coffee and other commodities. Trade with India and East Asia, contributed to cultural exchange and the development of the city's unique heritage. There are several historic fortifications located along the governorate's coastal region including at Bayt al-Faqih and Al-Luhayyah, which were built in the 19th century. These fortifications served for defensive purposes for the protection of coastal settlements, trade routes, and pilgrimage routes.

Hodeidah was part of the Ottoman rule until the end of the First World War in 1918, after which the British gained control over it. The British gave control of the region to the Idrisid dynasty of Asir. Saudi Arabia occupied the region briefly in 1934 before it was returned to Yemen later that year by the Treaty of Al-Ta'if. In 1962, the Soviet Union constructed the Hodeidah Port, Yemen's first deep-water port, north of the city, and the port was developed later as it became a part of a major international shipping route along the Red Sea towards the Suez Canal. During the 1960s, construction of roads connecting Hodeidah with Sanaa and other neighbouring governorates improved access and facilitated the growth of agriculture, trade, and exports. The population of Hodeidah increased in the aftermath of the Gulf War and Yemeni unification in the early 1990s.

Since the beginning of the Yemeni civil war in 2014, the governorate has been under the control of the Houthis. The governorate has since been contested between the Houthis and the government forces, which has resulted in an internal displacement of 336,846 people in 2020. It was part of renewed conflict between the Houthis and the government forces in 2026.

== Geography ==
Hodeidah is one of the 22 governorates of Yemen. Situated in the Tihamah coastal plains along the Red Sea coast, it is bordered by the governorates of Hajjah in the north, Al Mahwit, Sanaa, Raymah, Dhamar, and Ibb in the east, and Taiz in the south. Spread over an area of 13,300 km^{2} (5,100 sq mi), it is strategically located close to the Bab al-Mandab Strait, one of the major maritime corridors. The city of Hodeidah is located 226 km (140 mi) from the national capital Sanaa.

The governorate experiences a tropical climate, with long summers and short winters. The average annual temperature is about 29 °C (84 °F), and temperatures exceed 54 °C (129 °F) during the summers. It receives an average annual precipitation of 13 cm (5.1 in).

=== Districts ===
Hodeidah Governorate is divided into the following 26 districts.

- Ad Dahi district
- Ad Durayhimi district
- Al Garrahi district
- Al Hajjaylah district
- Al Hali district
- Al Hawak district
- Al Khawkhah district
- El Mansouria district
- Al Marawi'ah district
- Al Mighlaf district
- Al Mina district
- Al Munirah district
- Al Qanawis district
- Alluheyah district
- As Salif district
- As Sukhnah district
- At Tuhayta district
- Az Zaydiyah district
- Az Zuhrah district
- Bajil district
- Bayt al-Faqih district
- Bura district
- Hays district
- Jabal Ra's district
- Kamaran district
- Zabid district

== Demographics ==
According to the 1994 population census, Hodeidah Governorate had a population of 1,749,914 inhabitants, which increased to 2,157,552 in 2004, and 3,921,000 in 2011. However, due to the Yemeni civil war and subsequent displacement, the population was estimated to be 3,098,000 in 2017. It was the third-most populous governorate in Yemen after Ibb and Taiz in 2004.

== Transport ==
The Hodeidah port is a major maritime gateway to Yemen. Prior to the Yemeni civil war, more than 70% of the oil and food imports of the country came through the port. The Hodeidah International Airport is located 10 km (6.2 mi) south of Hodeidah port and serves for both civilian and military purposes.
