= Al Mina district =

Al Mina District
- District
- Location in Yemen
- Coordinates: 14°32′N 43°00′E
- Country: Yemen
- Governorate: Al Hudaydah

Population (2003)
  - Total: 91,843
- Time zone: UTC+3 (Yemen Standard Time)

Al Mina District is a district of the Al Hudaydah Governorate, Yemen. As of 2003, the district had a population of 91,843 inhabitants.
