= At Tuhayta district =

Coordinates: 14°10′N 43°10′E

At Tuhayta District مديرية التحيتا
- District
- Interactive map of At Tuhayta District
- Country: Yemen
- Governorate: Al Hudaydah Governorate

Population (2003)
  - Total: 67,660
- Time zone: UTC+3 (Yemen Standard Time)

At Tuhayta District (Arabic: مديرية التحيتا) is a district of the Al Hudaydah Governorate, Yemen. As of 2003, the district had a population of 67,660 people.
