= As Sukhnah district =

Coordinates: 14°40′N 43°15′E

As Sukhnah District
- District
- Interactive map of As Sukhnah District
- Country: Yemen
- Governorate: Al Hudaydah

Population (2003)
  - Total: 59,652
- Time zone: UTC+3 (Yemen Standard Time)

As Sukhnah District is a district of the Al Hudaydah Governorate, Yemen. As of 2003, the district had a population of 59,652 inhabitants.
