= As Salif district =

Coordinates: 15°15′N 42°40′E

As Salif District مديرية الصليف
- District
- Interactive map of As Salif District
- Country: Yemen
- Governorate: Al Hudaydah

Population (2003)
  - Total: 6,343
- Time zone: UTC+3 (Yemen Standard Time)

As Salif District (Arabic: مديرية الصليف) is a district of the Al Hudaydah Governorate, Yemen. As of 2003, the district had a population of 6,343 inhabitants.
