= Bura district =

Coordinates: 14°45′N 43°20′E

Bura District بُرع
- District
- Interactive map of Bura District
- Country: Yemen
- Governorate: Al Hudaydah

Population (2003)
  - Total: 45,116
- Time zone: UTC+3 (Yemen Standard Time)

Bura District (Arabic: مديرية بُرع) is a district of the Al Hudaydah Governorate, Yemen. As of 2003, the district had a population of 45,116 inhabitants.
