= Bajil district =

Coordinates: 15°06′N 43°28′E

Bajil
- District
- Interactive map of Bajil
- Country: Yemen
- Governorate: Al Hudaydah

Population (2003)
  - Total: 169,884
- Time zone: UTC+3 (Yemen Standard Time)

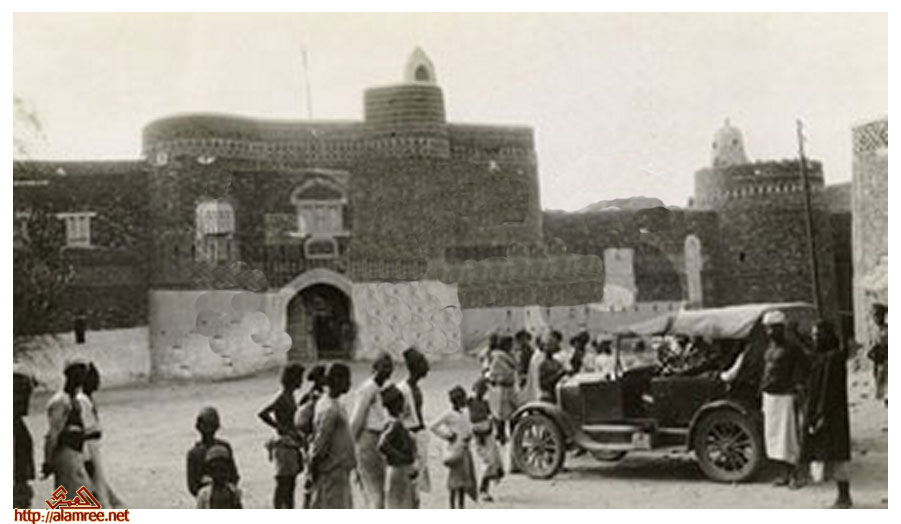
Bajel 1928

Bajil district is a district of the Al Hudaydah Governorate, Yemen. As of 2003, the district had a population of 169,884 inhabitants.
