= 2026 Yemen offensives =

SPC–PLC clashes in Yemen

- Part of the Houthi–Saudi conflict, the Saudi-led intervention in the Yemeni civil war, and the spillover of the 2026 Iran war
- Presidential Leadership Council (PLC) Supreme Political Council (SPC) Al-Qaeda in the Arabian Peninsula (AQAP) (See also a detailed map of the military situation in Yemen and border areas in Saudi Arabia.)
Date	3 September 2026 – present (2 months, 2 weeks and 5 days)
Location	Al-Bayda, Al-Hudaydah, Al-Jawf, Dhale, Marib, Taiz, and Lahej Governorates, Yemen
Status	Ongoing: Bab al-Mandab Strait crisis; Southern Movement resurgence in South Yemen; Houthi attacks on Saudi airports
Territorial changes	Houthis capture Hanish Islands, Hays and Al Khawkhah districts in Al-Hudaydah Governorate and Mokha and Dhubab districts in Taiz Governorate; Houthis capture At Turbah, cutting off Taiz and reestablishing the long-standing siege on it; PLC forces capture Al-Yatma and Labanat military camp in Al-Jawf Governorate; Houthis seize full control of Red Sea coast adjacent to Bab al-Mandab Strait

Belligerents
(Yemen) Supreme Political Council; Houthis; AQAP (Note: AQAP clashed with militants affiliated with the anti-Houthi Southern Movement in the province of Shabwah. Fighters belonging to the jihadist group were also targeted in a series of attacks primarily concentrated on the Yemeni branch of the Islamic State.)	(Yemen) Presidential Leadership Council; Saudi Arabia; (South Yemen) Southern Resistance (Note: The Southern Resistance ambushed figures and personnel from the PLC in Dhale, whilst affirming their prime objective are the Houthis, with some members condemning what occurred. Figureheads of the Resistance later on 13 September called upon the local Southern Resistance to cooperate with the PLC in Aden. The STC in Radfan District also reportedly called for general mobilization. They reportedly did not seek integration with the PLC but the creation of a cohesive Southern Resistance fighting force.)

Commanders and leaders
(Houthis) Abdul-Malik al-Houthi (Yemen) Mahdi al-Mashat (Yemen) Muhammad al-Atifi (Yemen) Yusuf al-Madani (Yemen) Muhammad Miftah (Yemen) Firaq Mohsen al-Assar † Sa'ad bin Atef al-Awlaki; Ibrahim al-Banna	(Yemen) Rashad al-Alimi (Yemen) Abdullah Bawazir (Yemen) Taher al-Aqili (Note: Captured by the Southern Resistance, later released) (Yemen) Sagheer Aziz (Yemen) Tareq Saleh (Yemen) Abu Zara'a (Yemen) Ahmed al-Qubba (Yemen) Hadi al-Awlaqi (Yemen) Wajdi al-Zubaidi (Yemen) Farouk al-Kholani (POW) (Yemen) Hamza Marsh Al-Kamali † (Saudi Arabia) Salman (Saudi Arabia) Mohammed bin Salman (Saudi Arabia) Khalid bin Salman (Saudi Arabia) Turki al-Maliki (Saudi Arabia) Fahd bin Hamad al-Salman (Saudi Arabia) Fayyadh Al Ruwaili: (South Yemen) Muhammad al-Malishi; (South Yemen) Nasr Atef al-Yafei

Units involved
Yemeni Armed Forces (SPC): (Yemen) Yemeni Land Forces (SPC); Unmanned Aviation Forces (SPC); Jama'at Ansar al-Shari'a	Yemeni Armed Forces (PLC): (Yemen) Yemeni Land Forces (PLC); 3rd Military Region; 4th Military Region; 6th Military Region; 7th Military Region; 8th Military Region; 1st Infantry Division; 33rd Armored Division; 4th Infantry Hashd Brigade; 13th Infantry Brigade; 14th Armored Brigade; 17th Infantry Brigade; 22nd Mechanized Brigade; 30th Armored Brigade; 35th Armored Brigade; 145th Infantry Brigade; 170th Air Defense Brigade; Al-Nasr Brigade; Homeland Shield Forces; 1st Homeland Shield Division; 6th Brigade; 3rd Homeland Shield Division; PLC-allied tribal fighters; Subaiha tribes; Deterrence Brigades; Yemeni Air Force (PLC); Yemeni National Resistance; 5th Brigade; Tihamah Resistance; Giants Brigades; Al-Islah party; Saudi Arabian Armed Forces; Royal Saudi Air Force; 55 Squadron; Royal Saudi Navy; Royal Saudi Air Defense Forces; Saudi Arabian National Guard; 2nd SANG Aviation Brigade; Saudi Arabian Border Guard; (South Yemen) Southern Resistance; (South Yemen) Support and Reinforcement Brigades; General Union of Southern Arabian Tribes (Note: The Union declared its full support for the Southern Resistance's actions in Dhale against the PLC, and called upon a mobilization of men and equipment to support their efforts against the Houthis.)

Casualties and losses
(Yemen) Per Yemeni National Resistance (on the west coast 9 Aug.–10 Sep.):: 1,000+ killed; thousands injured; Per Houthis (1–12 & 27 Oct.): 346 killed; Per PLC: 16,100 killed or wounded	(Yemen) Per Yemeni National Resistance (on the west coast 9 Aug.–10 Sep.):: 500+ killed; 1,500 injured; Per PLC (1–12 & 27 Oct.): 240 killed; (Yemen) Per Homeland Shield Forces; Heavy losses; Per SPC: (Saudi Arabia) 1 F-15SA shot down; (Saudi Arabia) 1 Eurofighter Typhoon damaged; Per Saudi: (Saudi Arabia) 1 AH-6I lost, 2 crew members killed; (South Yemen) Per Southern Resistance: 100+ killed
- 69 civilians killed in Yemen (Aug.–6 Nov. 2026); 2,260+ killed in Yemen; 10,519+ injured in Yemen; 26 killed in Saudi Arabia (Note: 7 Saudis, 3 Bangladeshis, 2 Sudanese, 2 Indians, 1 American, 1 Moroccan, 1 Egyptian, 1 Jordanian, 1 Syrian, 1 Palestinian, 1 Algerian, 1 Filipino, 1 Nepalese, 1 Yemeni national.); 450+ injured in Saudi Arabia; 1 Italian Air Force Eurofighter Typhoon damaged 347,321+ displaced in Yemen

On 3 September 2026, the Iran-backed Houthis launched an offensive against the Saudi-backed Presidential Leadership Council (PLC), the internationally recognized government of Yemen, amid the ongoing Yemeni civil war. Clashes began in Taiz Governorate, prompting a PLC counter-offensive against the Houthis in the Al-Jawf and Al-Bayda governorates.

The fighting coincides with the ongoing 2026 Iran war, which has marked the deadliest fighting in Yemen since the collapse of the 2022 ceasefire. The Yemeni government lost areas around the Bab al-Mandab Strait in Yemen's southwest after a swift battle over Mokha, resulting in a crisis with the entire west coast of Yemen (except for the Midi district) falling under control of the Houthi movement, who named the operation as Operation Allah is Stronger in Might and More Severe in Punishment. (Note: Arabic: وَاللهُ أَشَدُّ بَأْسًا وَأَشَدُّ تَنْكيلًا, romanized: wa-Allāhu Ashaddu Ba’san wa-Ashaddu Tankīlā ^{[Quran 4:84]}) The counteroffensive of the PLC against the Houthis was named Operation Dawn of Yemen. (Note: Arabic: فَجْرُ اليَمَن, romanized: Fajru al-Yaman)

== Background ==
=== 2022 ceasefire and the Red Sea crisis ===
The Houthis and the internationally recognized government of Yemen reached a ceasefire agreement in 2022, which largely held until the 2026 campaign. Peace talks stalled in 2023 amidst the Gaza war. Starting on 19 October 2023, the Houthis began launching missiles and drones at international shipping crossing the Bab al-Mandab Strait in solidarity with Palestinians during the war in Gaza, triggering the Red Sea crisis. In response, a US-led multinational coalition launched Operation Prosperity Guardian in late 2023 to secure shipping through the Red Sea. In early 2024, the United States and the United Kingdom launched a series of airstrikes targeting Houthi missile and drone launch sites across Yemen. In March 2025, the United States launched a larger wave of strikes against the Houthis, after which the Houthis agreed to stop attacking U.S. vessels in the Red Sea. Additionally, Israel previously launched a series of airstrikes on Houthi-controlled Yemen in response to missile attacks by the group, including a July 2024 strike on Tel Aviv that killed one person. Following the implementation of the Gaza peace plan in 2025, both parties briefly ceased attacks until March 2026, when the Houthis again launched missiles toward Israel in support of Iran and the Axis of Resistance, all of which were intercepted.

=== 2026 Iran war and escalation ===
On 28 February 2026, the United States and Israel launched a large-scale attack on Iran, aimed at regime change. Iran and its allied militias, including Hezbollah and the Iraqi Popular Mobilization Forces, retaliated against U.S., Israeli, and other regional countries' military and energy infrastructure with drone and missile strikes. The Houthis initially refrained from joining the fighting, breaking with the rest of the Axis of Resistance, only joining the war on 28 March.

When the US navy reimposed its naval blockade against Iran on 14 July 2026, the Islamic Revolutionary Guard Corps (IRGC) of Iran threatened to cut "all other export corridors that benefit the US and its allies", with a senior Houthi official warning that the group was prepared to close the Bab al-Mandab Strait. On 16 July 2026, Reuters reported that Iran had asked the Houthis to be ready to close the strait should the US strike Iranian power infrastructure. Soon after the Houthis began deploying drones and missiles near the Bab al-Mandeb Strait.

On 13 July 2026, a Mahan Air flight carrying IRGC commanders and weapons attempted to land at Sanaa Airport, in the Houthi-controlled capital. Yemeni government forces and Saudi Arabia responded by striking the airport's runway to prevent the landing. In retaliation for the strike, the Houthis declared the ceasefire with the Yemeni government and Saudi Arabia over. On 20 July, the Houthis announced a naval blockade on Saudi Arabia, amid the renewed U.S. naval blockade of Iran. The Houthis subsequently began striking Saudi oil tankers in the Red Sea. On 24 July, Saudi Arabia retaliated against the earlier Houthi strikes on its oil tankers by bombing Houthi targets in the port city of Hodeidah. In response, the Houthis struck the Jizan oil refinery and the port city of Yanbu in Saudi Arabia two days later. Starting on 6 August, the Houthis also started striking Yemeni government forces across the country with missiles and drones, killing and injuring dozens of troops.

== Timeline ==
=== 3–9 September ===
On 3 September, the Houthis launched what was described as a "massive offensive" in the Taiz Governorate, attempting to cut the road linking Taiz to Mokha and thus sever Taiz city from the coast and escalate the Siege of Taiz. At least 129 people were reportedly killed (At least 66 Yemeni Government / PLC soldiers, At least 62 Houthi Militia Forces fighters, and At least 1 Yemeni civilian) in the clashes. Despite initial Houthi gains, Yemeni government forces (PLC) were able to regain control of some of the lost territories.

On 4 September, the PLC said it had recaptured the al-Khazan and al-Makahna hills in the Jabal Habashi district west of Taiz city.

On 6 September, the PLC claimed to have taken full control of the Hays district in Al-Hudaydah Governorate, and advanced in western Taiz.

On 7 September, the PLC claimed to have made advances on several fronts in the Al-Jawf and Al-Bayda regions, taking control of the Al-Labanat military camp and moving toward the town of Al Hazm. The Houthis accused Saudi Arabia of launching airstrikes across Yemen, including on a prison in Al Hazm, killing 23 people. They also claimed that a ballistic missile struck a military convoy en route to the Al-Wadiah military base in Hadhramaut. A Saudi Aramco oil refinery in Jizan was also struck by Houthi forces.

The Yemeni National Resistance claimed that several Somali al-Shabaab militants were killed fighting alongside the Houthis in western Yemen.

On 8 September, the PLC said their offensive aimed to capture the Houthi-held capital, Sanaa, and reported that government-aligned forces had advanced on the outskirts of Dhi Na'im district in Al-Bayda governorate and had captured the town of Yatma in Al-Jawf governorate.

The Houthis struck the cities of Khamis Mushait, Abha, Jizan and Najran in Saudi Arabia with drones and missiles, wounding 73 people and damaging several oil sites. Houthi shelling on an internally displaced person camp in Marib killed two children and injured 15 others. The Houthis also accused Saudi Arabia of conducting airstrikes on multiple sites in Yemen.

The PLC said that it recaptured Al-Mukazama and Al-Mihal in Taiz and struck a Houthi gathering in Jabal Habashi.

During fighting in Taiz, the National Resistance said that it captured Ali al-Adhari, a senior leader in the Houthi rapid intervention unit in al-Barh.

On 9 September, Houthi media reported 32 Saudi airstrikes in the regions of Marib, Al-Jawf, Taiz and Hodeidah.

Yemeni army airstrikes also hit Houthi positions in Maqbanah, where an offensive was launched to capture Kadha. Also in Taiz, the PLC said that it retook Makazma, Mihal hill, Hamra, Sawda, and Shiek, while a Houthi offensive targeting al-Wazi'iyah was repelled.

The PLC launched a major offensive in southern Marib, capturing several areas, as well as villages in al-Kaddah in Taiz. Government-run Saba News Agency reported that an attack by the Houthis in Marib killed three children.

Clashes occurred in al-Bayda, al-Dhale, Hodeidah. Additionally, Houthi shelling killed two civilians in Hays. The Southern Giants Brigades said it struck a Houthi combat vehicle in al-Bayda, killing its occupants.

An airstrike reportedly hit a gathering of Houthi leaders in al-Bahr that included Houthi defense minister Mohamed al-Atifi, although his fate was unclear.

Turki al-Maliki, spokesman for the Saudi-led coalition, said that the Houthis conducted drone and ballistic missile attacks on Khamis Mushait, Abha, and Jizan. The Houthis seized the Khalid bin Walid camp after several clashes with the PLC in Taiz Governorate.

A Yemeni army (PLC) convoy was ambushed while driving on a road in Hays, Hodeidah governorate when it was shot by suspected Houthi soldiers, killing one person and injuring a couple more.

Remnants of the Southern Transitional Council—now identifying as the "Southern Resistance"—blocked local roads in Dhale and ambushed a convoy transporting Taher al-Aqili with the use of light and heavy weaponry, alongside drones and the support of local rioters; Alongside Tahir, a variety of important Yemeni political figures were also present at the convoy visiting the area, including the Governor of Al-Dhali' Governorate Ahmed al-Qubba, the Commander of the Eighth Military Region Hadi al-Awlaqi, the Commander of the 33rd Armored Division Major General Wajdi al-Zubaidi. On the same day the Southern Resistance and the PLC were reported jointly thwarthing a Houthi advance towards Al-Masharih-Al-Thawkhab sector in a confrontation which lasted one hour.

Major fighting broke out in Maarib leading to escalation and the beginning of the 2026 Marib campaign

=== 10–16 September ===
On 10 September, Houthi forces captured the districts of Hays and Al Khawkhah in Hodeidah province, as well as the town of Mokha in western Taiz province, following advances. The PLC said that its forces had retreated toward the Dhubab district near the Bab al-Mandab strait.

A Houthi strike in Mafraq Harib in Marib killed three children and injured six others. The Houthis said that they shot down a Karayel drone from Saudi Arabia over Hajjah Governorate.

Later in the day, reports emerged that the Houthis also captured the Hanish Islands in Hodeidah governorate, amid unverified claims of the capture of the strategically located Dhubab district and Perim island in the Bab al-Mandeb strait.

The Houthis said that Saudi Arabia had conducted 64 airstrikes in Taiz, Hodeidah, Marib, and Al-Jawf, adding that their air defenses repelled an aerial squadron over Taiz.

Following their withdrawal from Mokha district, the PLC declared a "kill box" around the area, intending to use "all weapons and firepower", and warning civilians to avoid the Taiz–Mokha road until further notice.

Following the incident that occurred between the Southern Resistance and the PLC the day prior, Southern Resistance's Brigadier General Ali Shaif Al-Hariri, an official spokesperson of the group, issued a formal statement categorically rejecting and condemning the disruption of Minister Al-Aqili's convoy. Al-Hariri labeled the ambush a "reprehensible and unacceptable act" that ran counter to the tribal customs and history of Dhale. The official leadership statement emphasized that internal political differences within the resistance must not escalate into violence or chaos, stating that his group should focus most of its firepower against the Houthis instead. On the same day, the General Union of Southern Arabian Tribes stated its support for the events that took place in Dhale and stated it was ready to support the Southern Resistance with men and equipment, following up with an official call to arms the following day.

On 11 September, the Houthis claimed control over Yemen's entire Red Sea coast, including the Perim Island and the al-Omari camp. The Yemeni government said that its forces had withdrawn from Perim, and that the Houthis had also captured the town of Dhubab, on the Red Sea coast facing the island. Reports of the Houthis taking Perim islands were also confirmed by Saudi and PLC sources. The Houthis also advanced into Al Aradi, and skirmished with government forces near Jabal Kahbub.

Axios reported that Saudi Crown Prince Mohammed bin Salman called President Donald Trump twice on 10 September, urging him to launch strikes against the Houthis, but that Trump rejected the request. Two U.S. officials said the US did not intend to directly intervene at the time. A PLC official also said the US withheld support from a full-scale Saudi air attack. Saudi airstrikes targeted the Mokha airport. The Yemeni Brigadier General Farouk al-Kholani of the 1st Infantry Division was initially reported killed while battling Houthi forces, along with his son on the west coast of Yemen. It was later revealed that al-Kholani was captured by Houthi fighters.

The Support and Reinforcement Brigades, who traditionally operated alongside the former Security Belt Forces in Aden and Lahej under the command of the STC prior to its fall, announced through their leader and spokesperson Aidarus al-Zoubaidi and through Brigadier General Nasr Atef al-Yafei, their full combat readiness to protect Southern Yemen and fight for the cause of South Yemen, calling all other formations of the Southern Resistance to unite in a front for national interest.

The PLC-aligned Yemeni Air Force began airstrikes on a designated "kill zone" in Taiz Governorate, with army spokesman Col. Majed Al-Nuzaily warning citizens to stay off the roads of Taiz-Mokha and Mokha-Dhubab.

On 12 September, Yemeni government forces said they carried out air strikes on Houthi fighters and vehicles near Mocha, including on the Mocha–Dhubab road. Saudi Civil Defence said a projectile fired by the Houthis that landed in the Al-Tuwal governorate of Jazan damaged several vehicles. The Houthis said Saudi warplanes had carried out 129 air raids on Yemeni governorates, including Taiz, over the previous 48 hours. Fighting also continued in the mountainous terrain of Taiz Governorate.

The International Organization for Migration warned that at least 76,000 people had been displaced in Yemen, with many facing repeated displacement.

On 13 September, a mosque in Jizan province was hit by a projectile that injured two people.

There were claims that the Southern Resistance and the Giants Brigade had liberated Dhubab, but they were contradicted by field reports, which stated that both the Southern Resistance and the Giants Brigade, under the leadership of Major General Hamdi Shukri and Brigadier General Ali Hassan Al-Radfani, had clashed with the Houthis. Reports suggested that after securing the coast, the Houthis turned their attention towards offensives in the Lahaj and Marib governorates, with Al Jazeera reporting clashes in the outskirts of Marib. The PLC's reserve Homeland Shield Forces claimed that its 6th Brigade had downed five drones during clashes in the al-Aghbara area.

Yemeni government forces claimed to have recaptured the Al-Ghail area in Al-Waziyah, seizing abandoned equipment and vehicles. They also stated their forces took the overlooks of Jabal Jardad in Al-Shamaytain, as well as advances on Ghayl Bani Omar, with airstrikes claimed to have destroyed vehicles, stored ammunition, and killing at least 10 Houthi fighters.

On 14 September, Al Jazeera reported that the Houthis advanced in PLC-held Marib and Taiz areas, later reporting that the PLC repelled the offensive in western Taiz, before once again reporting that Houthi militants had managed to breach the PLC's previously established front line between 17:00 KSA/14:00 GMT and 18:00 KSA/15:00 GMT. Houthi forces had advanced eastwards in Ash-Shamayatayn district and westward in Hayfan district towards Bani Gazyi. Houthis claimed to have struck and inflicted heavy damage on the King Khalid Airbase.

On 15 September, Houthis launched missile and drone attacks targeting Khamis Mushait, Abha and Taif, resulting in 13 civilians being injured and damaging property.

The Houthis launched an offensive in Al-Jawf, showing images of destroyed vehicles and fighting, in addition to the retaliatory bombings by the Saudi-led coalition. Yemeni government released videos of 11 airstrikes targeting Houthi positions and infrastructure near Mokha and Dhubab, anti-Houthi media reported additional strikes in Hays District while Houthis separately claimed that Saudi airstrikes targeted Hajjah, Taiz, and Lahij governorates.

On 16 September, according to the spokesman of the Saudi-led coalition in Yemen, Major General Turki al-Maliki, Saudi air defenses intercepted a drone south of the holy city of Mecca. The Houthis denied targeting the city of Mecca. Houthis, however, claimed to have targeted Yanbu and King Khalid Airbase in missile and drone strikes.

The Houthis claimed to have shot down a Saudi F-15 fighter jet after the aircraft was hit by a locally made missile. Footage later released by the Houthis appeared to show the tail of a Royal Saudi Air Force F-15SR in the Marib Governorate.

The PLC stated that its forces bombarded outposts and equipment near Mokha and conducted drone attacks against Houthi forces in Marib.

Satellite imagery showed that Houthis had constructed ~11km of earthen berms along the frontline north of al Aradi.

=== 17–23 September ===
On 17 September, Al Jazeera reported significant clashes for the control of the Kahbub mountains between the PLC and the Houthis, with the PLC successfully repelling an offensive causing, according to its own sources, injuries and deaths on the other side whilst securing the arrest of two Houthi fighters. Yemeni forces including Giants Brigades, Homeland Shield and Subaiha tribes claimed to have fully recaptured the Kahbub mountains after clashes which dealt heavy losses to the Houthis.

Houthis also attempted to advance into the Marib Governorate but were not able to gain any significant territory.

According to Saudi Civil Defense a Yemeni resident was killed and a Saudi woman and a Pakistani resident were injured in the Saudi city of Taif by a Houthi drone attack. This marked the first civilian death in Saudi Arabia since the end of the 2022 cease fire.

The Houthi-linked Almasirah reported that a civilian was killed in Taiz and another injured in strikes on the town of Abs, Yemen, it also reported that three children were killed from Saudi airstrikes. Houthis also claimed to have shot a Saudi drone in Harad district.

The Southern Resistance claimed that, with the alleged assistance of tribesmen from the Subeihi region, they had successfully repelled the offensive of a Houthi offensive in al-Sudair-al-Dakhula, claiming to have captured 1 military vehicle, 2 Houthi militia members and having killed more than 12 Houthi fighters.

On 18 September, Italian defense minister Guido Crosetto announced that an Italian Air Force Eurofighter Typhoon aircraft was damaged at the King Fahd Air Base during a Houthi strike.

The Southern Resistance claimed that, with the alleged assistance of tribesmen from the Subeihi region, they had successfully repelled the offensive of a Houthi brigade in al-Sudair-al-Dakhula, allegedly thwarting an offensive in the area for the second time.

Saudi Arabia proposed a two-week ceasefire with the Houthis, mediated through Oman.

On 19 September, Houthi major general Firaq Mohsen al-Asar, also known as "Abu Saqr", was reportedly killed alongside six of his staff in Kahboub. The PLC said that Houthi offensives near Taiz were repelled, killing 30 Houthis and injuring 60 others. It later said that it thwarted a Houthi attack in al-Fuliahan in Marib, killing 12 Houthis. The army announced that 13 Yemeni soldiers were killed in the governorates of Taiz and Lahej in the past two days.

Following an air raid alert in Riyadh, a fire and rising smoke was reported at the King Khalid International Airport. The Houthis claimed the attack, along with missile and drone strikes on Saudi Aramco facilities in Yanbu.

On 20 September, the Giants Brigades claimed to have launched "precise" attacks against Houthi-owned infrastructure and vehicles in Al-Bayda Governorate.

The PLC claimed to have captured Jabal Numan, west of Taiz; securing the Bani Bakari–Al-Ashrouh–Al-Birin road, establishing a connection with the Al-Kadha front.

The Yemeni army said that fighting outside Marib killed 80 Houthis. Houthi media reported that a Saudi strike on telecommunications towers in Khabb wa ash Sha'af district killed four civilians and injured three others.

On 21 September, the Giants Brigades claimed responsibility for the destruction of five military vehicles belonging to the Houthis in Kahbub; one of the vehicles was transporting a Houthi commander, while the others carried reinforcements and weapons. The Homeland Shield Forces claimed to have shot down 2 Houthi drones during the clashes.

Houthis unsuccessfully attempted an advance into western Taiz Governorate along three axes near Jabal Naman, Jabal Rasin, and Jabal Jirdad on 20-21 September but were repelled by government forces. Houthi missile strikes hit a crowded market south of Kahboub, injuring several people, according to the PLC.

On 22 September, fighting and airstrikes in Taiz, al-Jawf, Marib, Saada, and Lahej killed 118 Houthis and 36 Yemeni soldiers since 20 September. The Houthis also said that Saudi airstrikes killed six civilians in Mocha and nine people at a prison in al-Jawf.

The PLC chief of staff for the Taiz military axis, Major General Abdulaziz al-Majidi said the army captured Mount Qarfan in Taiz, killing five Houthis and injuring 20. Fighting also continued near Jabal Kahbub.

On 23 September, the Houthis said that Saudi airstrikes in Taiz and Al-Jawf killed ten civilians and injured 14 others. The group also said that it shot down a Saudi-operated CAIG Wing Loong II drone over Mocha.

=== 24–30 September ===
On 24 September, clashes in Lahej, Taiz, Hodeidah, and Saada killed 98 Yemeni soldiers and 52 Houthis. The PLC said that it repelled an overnight Houthi infiltration attempt against al-Ashbout and Heijah al-Abd, a key route from Taiz to Aden, in Al Maqatirah district, and al-Ahkum in Hayfan district. Yemeni and coalition forces conducted at least three airstrikes in al Akbush to prevent Houthi advances.

Houthi and Yemeni government exchanged territory in western Taiz Governorate near Jabal Kahbub with the government seizing territory around al Ajram, and National Resistance Forces conducting drone strikes on Houthi forces encroaching onto Dar Qashimiyah, while Southern Giants Brigades reinforced their positions near Jabal Kahbub.

Saudi Arabia said that it shot down six ballistic missiles from Yemen targeting Taif and Yanbu. Houthi spokesperson Yahya Saree later said that the group attacked Saudi military sites in Jazan, causing hundreds of casualties among Saudi and Yemeni forces, as well as Sudanese mercenaries. Later, the Houthis claimed missile and drone strikes against Riyadh and Saudi Aramco sites in Yanbu.

On 25 September, the Homeland Shield Forces stated that, with the support of the Giants Brigades and members of local tribes, they captured the summit of Mount Dar al-Kafir in Lahej Governorate following an infiltration and an assault, as engagements comtinued along the Taiz-Aden GLOC. Yemeni government also claimed to have captured Houthi positions on Jabal Naman, with National Shield Forces conducting a drone strike against Houthi positions there. Yemeni forces also launched ATGM strikes on Houthi forces near Jabal Kahbub.

On 26 September, clashes were reported in Marib and Taiz, with the PLC claiming that the Houthis bombarded their positions in northern Taiz with several projectiles. Houthis claimed to have repelled Yemeni government assaults on their positions at Jabal Naman.

Saudi and Yemeni government forces launched two drone strikes, one targeting a Houthi weapons depot in Al Jubah District and another targeting a weapons logistics vehicle in Al Kasara in Marib Governorate. Houthi military spokesperson Yahya Sarea claimed that Saudi Arabia launched 27 airstrikes targeting bridges and roads in Taiz, Marib, Saada, Amran, Ibb, and Hajjah governorates, with al Dalil Bridge in Al Makhadir District, being heavily damaged. Saudi air defenses meanwhile intercepted two Houthi ballistic missiles near Khamis Mushait and two Houthi drones near Riyadh. The Yemeni government claimed to have struck multiple Houthi targets in Taiz Governorate, including the Istiqbal camp in Mawiyah. Pro-government sources reported a Houthi naval commander had been killed in fighting near Jabal Kuhbab.

On 27 September, Saudi Arabia shifted schools and universities in Riyadh to remote learning for a week, seemingly due to escalating tensions.

The Yemeni military announced that it had conducted 756 operations, including airstrikes, targeting Houthis between 24 and 27 September. Saudi and Yemeni forces targeted Houthi forces positioned east of Taiz, with pro-government sources reporting airstrikes on warehouses supplying food to Houthis east of Taiz City and on a newly-established camp near al Hawban, killing Houthi official Nour al Din al Marani. Southern Giants Brigades struck Houthi fighters and vehicles near Jabal Kahbub using a drone. The Houthis said that a Saudi strike on a market in Taiz Governorate killed seven people and injured 40 others. The Yemeni army said that it killed four Iranian missile and drone experts in the same region. Houthis and government forces skirmished in Jabal Habashi District.

On 28 September, Saudi Foreign Minister Faisal bin Farhan Al Saud met with US Secretary of State Marco Rubio to discuss the war, bilateral relations, and regional events. Prince Faisal urged foreign powers to protect shipping and advocated a comprehensive peace deal in Yemen.

A large explosion was reported in Sanaa, as operations targeting a senior Houthi missile force commander and two missile experts, as well as a command center in Al Sabee, were carried out in Sanaa. Yemeni government carried out airstrikes on Houthi depots near Ar-Rubay'i and in the port of Mokha. According to Almasirah, four civilians, including three women and an elderly man, were reportedly killed and three others wounded after a Saudi airstrike struck a civilian home in Al-Maafer district of Taiz.

The Giants Brigades claimed the destruction of a vehicle carrying a Houthi leader and his companions on the Khabub front. Southern Giants Brigades also published several videos of ATGM and quadcopter strikes on Houthi forces attempting to advance on 27-28 September. Anti-Houthi media reported that 40 Government personnel had been killed in Marib Governorate on September 28.

On 29 September, PLC spokesman Majid Al-Nuzaili claimed that PLC forces carried out 414 attacks against the Houthis in 24 hours. Airstrikes struck Houthi weapons depots in Saada and Amran Governorates. The Taibah power distribution station in Madinah was struck by a Houthi strike.

On 30 September, the PLC claimed to have launched attacks towards Al-Jund and the area surrounding Taiz International Airport. Saudi airstrikes targeted Houthi missile launchers, military bases and communications infrastructure in Amran Governorate, PLC airstrikes also hit a Houthi depot in Saada.

Clashes intensified in Taiz, Lahej and Marib, following the PLC's call for a general mobilization; a child died following a bombardment in the Sala area, east of Taiz. Clashes continued in Jabal Habashi as PLC forces conducted an ATGM strike on a Houthi vehicle in Al-Wazi'iyah district.

=== 1–7 October ===
On 1 October, the PLC claimed to have carried out 27 attacks against the Houthis around the Taiz front, resulting in the destruction of vehicles and killing several Houthi fighters, Houthi spokesman Yahya Saree claimed that Saudi forces had conducted 47 airstrikes. Saudi forces struck Houthi communications in Sadaa Governorate. Houthi forces advanced into the village of Al Muharraqah and the nearby Najd al Bard area and conducted an IED attack on the Hijat al Abd road, following which they withdrew being repelled by PLC forces. Houthis advanced into al Salaf Village in Same'a district and into the Bani Baraki Village, using APCs. PLC official claimed that Houthis had suffered 80 casualties in Taiz Governorate.

On the same day, Saudi air defenses said they intercepted two ballistic missiles over Khamis Mushait and Jazan, in addition to four drones in Khamis Mushait.

An unnamed individual of African descent who was under scrutiny for alleged ties with the Houthis and suspects of possible sabotage plans in Haifan-Ayrin area was captured by the Southern Resistance.

On 2 October, the PLC bombarded Houthi positions in Bani Bakari, Al-Kadha, and Jabal Numan with airstrikes, in addition to attacking Houthi supply lines in Jabal Rasen, Al-Waziyah. 75 PLC airstrikes targeting Houthis were reported in Taiz Governorate, as Houthis conducted a large scale assault along the frontlines. PLC also claimed to have struck "High value targets" in Sanaa.

On 3 October, Houthi spokesman Yahya Saree claimed to have attacked the Aramco facility in Riyadh with ballistic missiles and drones. PLC conducted 13 airstrikes in Sanaa. Houthis attempted to advance along Taiz-Aden GLOC, attacking positions belonging to the Al-Islah party in Same'a district, capturing the Al-Ja'sha area.

On 4 October, Houthi forces said they seized the Al-Safiya area, where they cut the main road connecting Aden and Taiz, and entered the town of Wadi Al-Barakani. The Houthis captured the city of At Turbah, following the withdrawal of PLC forces. Al Mansora, also fell to Houthi advance. The pro-Houthi newspaper Al-Khabar Al-Yemeni, however, claimed that Houthi gains exceeded the city and extended to the alleged occupation of Jabal Habashi, Al-Nashmah, and Najd Qasim. The Houthis occupied Najd al-Bard near Hejah al-Abd road, whilst the PLC managed to fend off offensives in Bani Omar, Samea and Bani Bakari. On the same day the PLC announced that they were initiating a major counteroffensive with the objective to reconquer all Houthi-held territories, calling it the "battle of liberation" to "end the coup". The Giants Brigades claimed the destruction of a Houthi-owned vehicle in the Al-Waziyah area. On that day President Commander Aydarus Al-Zubaydi called upon cohesion and general mobilization amongst ex-STC elements, which the Southern Resistance welcomed and complied with. Meanwhile the Southern Resistance aligned Third Support and Reinforcement Brigade reported that militiamen riding a Kia vehicle ambushed one of their Dyna truck in Al-Khadira area of Abyan Governorate, leading to death of three of their soldiers and one injured soldier and the Dyna being captured. The Southern Resistance and Ex-STC elements reported the organization of a "million-person march in Aden and the southern governorates" to be held on 14 October 2026 to bolster the morale and manpower of the militants which were fighting. Houthis claimed to have attacked two Aramco facilities using drone and ballistic missile attacks in Riyadh and Khurais oil field.

On 5 October, the PLC announced the start of Operation Dawn of Yemen, aimed at retaking Sanaa and ending Houthi control of Yemen. Around 100 Saudi aircraft were supporting the operation, striking hundreds of Houthi targets. The PLC said that it captured much of Dhubab district, including Dhubab airport, and severed the road from Dhubab to Mokha; the Houthis denied that any gains were made. The Yemeni military said that operations in Saada, al-Jawf, and Taiz "neutralized" 1,747 Houthis, and launched an attack on Raghwan district. The Houthis claimed the capture of al-Mawasit district. Yemeni media and Il Sole 24 Ore later reported that the PLC recaptured Mokha, which the Houthis later denied. The PLC claimed to have shot down 5 drones belonging to the Houthis in Taiz. The Saudi-led coalition said that it conducted naval strikes in Hodeidah, destroying depots containing bomb-laden boats and naval mines, with further airstrikes targeting Kamaran and As-Salif. Pakistan and Turkey pledged to mobilize troops in Saudi Arabia to defend it from further Houthi attacks. Houthis claimed to have targeted King Khalid International Airport, Abha International Airport, the Aramco oil refinery in Rabigh, the King Khalid Air Base, and the Aqifa military camp in Asir Province, moreover, King Abdullah bin Abdulaziz International Airport and Najran International Airport were struck and damaged by Houthi forces, injuring three people.

On 6 October, the Saudi-led coalition announced that it destroyed a weapons depot housing 20 ballistic missiles in Saada and a missile launch site in Sanaa. The PLC said that they, together with the Popular Resistance Forces, took control of the al-Manzara, al-Ashari and Dhiban mountains in Haifan. It added that operations in Taiz the day prior killed 100 Houthis and injured 150 others. Houthi sources reported that 160 fighters were killed in the past 24 hours, while the PLC reported that 115 soldiers were killed. The 3rd Military Region attacked a Houthi military vehicle on the Marib front, as PLC forces captured Qarun-al-Nour and Houthi positions in the mountains of southern Marib. The Giants Brigades claimed to have repelled a Houthi attack in Dhubab district, as Houthis engaged PLC forces using sniper fire, FPV drones and ambush tactics to halt government advance near Dhubab. Houthis struck a gathering of PLC forces near Ras al Ara on October 6, while Saudi/PLC forces conducted an airstrike on the Houthi-controlled Al Omari Base. PLC forces also initiated a counteroffensive in Al-Wazi'iyah district. Houthis claimed missile strikes on Abha International Airport and a military camp in al Dagharir.

On 7 October, the Houthis launched two ballistic missiles toward Aden International Airport; no injuries were reported. The PLC said that it captured the Kahbub front near the Bab al-Mandab. It added that 1,860 Houthis were "neutralized" as part of Operation Dawn of Yemen. Houthi missile attacks killed two people (One Moroccan citizen and One Algerian citizen) and injured 28 others (primarily identified as Saudi citizens, a Bangladeshi resident, and a Filipino resident) at Abha International Airport, and killed one (One Sudanese citizen) and injured eight (five Saudi citizen, two Egyptian citizen and a Pakistani citizen) at King Khalid International Airport. After the attacks, the Saudi-led coalition said that it destroyed 82 Houthi targets across Yemen. The Houthis claimed to have captured the As-Silw district, following the withdrawal of PLC forces, the town of Najd al Nashamah was captured by Houthis as they also advanced in Al-Maafer district and Al-Mawasit district. Pro-PLC media however claimed that the Houthi attack on As-Silw was repelled, with 12 Houthi fighters being killed. PLC forces captured Umm Rish military camp from the Houthis in Marib Governorate. The Homeland Shield Forces announced they had launched attacks on Houthi infrastructure at Labanat military camp. Clashes between PLC and Houthis continued in Al Waziyah.

=== 8–14 October ===
On 8 October, the Saudi-led coalition said that it intercepted three Houthi ballistic missiles fired at Saudi Arabia. Strikes on the King Khalid International Airport killed three Saudi nationals, including a pilot, and destroying a Saudia Airbus A321-200 aircraft, while also damaging two nearby aircraft, including a Saudia Airbus A321neo. The first attack hit the airport facilities, while the second hit the aircraft. Homeland Shield Forces claimed to have established control over Jabal Kahbub. as PLC forces repelled Houthi advances in Jabal Habashi and al Salu districts. PLC airstrikes struck Houthi infrastructure on the Sanaa-Taiz highway. Pro-PLC outlets reported the killing of two senior Houthi commanders, including Ammar Da'ah, the commander of the militia's western coast axis. Houthis claimed to have struck PLC forces gatherings in Ras al Ara and As Suqayyan in Lahij Governorate. Houthis also constructed four miles long earthen beams between Dhubab and the al Omari Base.

On 9 October, the Houthis claimed to have captured the Jabal Habashi district, after the withdrawal of PLC forces. Pro-government fighters were however reported to be still fighting the Houthis in the area. Yemeni military sources initially said that the Giants Brigades and Homeland Shield Forces completed the capture of the Bab al-Mandab, along with the al-Ardi military camp and Mayyun Island, however it was later reported that Mayyun Island and the Bab al-Mandab remained under Houthi control. During the clashes, 16th Giants Brigade commander Col. Mu'adh Ali Saleh and his deputy, Lt. Col. Khalid Hamoud Al-Hawd, were killed; the clashes left 50 members of the Giants Brigades and the Homeland Shield Forces dead and 80 wounded. The PLC said that it "neutralized" 1,400 Houthis in 2,750 strikes over the past 24 hours. Pro-PLC sources claimed that the PLC captured Al-Misrakh district after a brief incursion by the Houthis. PLC forces recaptured al Misrakh in Taiz Governorate. The Saudi-led coalition said that it destroyed 136 Houthi targets in a large-scale operation. Saudi airstrikes were reported in Saada and Sanaa governorates, targeting missile launch sites, depots, communications and a radar station, coalition claimed that three missile launchers had been destroyed in the strikes.

On 10 October, Yemeni sources reported that fighting in western Yemen in the past 24 hours killed 35 soldiers and 28 Houthis. They added that Yemeni forces were still advancing in the Bab al-Mandab. The PLC said that they repelled Houthi offensives north of Dhubab Airport and on the Wadi al-Dhabab road, the entrance into Taiz city. Houthis also engaged government forces in Jabal Sabr and Najd Qasim, and were repelled during an attempted advance near al Shaqab, as Houthis claimed control over Mawasit, Sama, and As-Silw districts. PLC military sources said that additional clashes in southern Taiz Governorate reportedly killed 25 Houthis, and a Yemeni airstrike on a command and control center in Same'a district killed four Houthi field commanders. Houthi shelling in the province killed two civilians and injured 16 others. The Houthis said that Saudi Arabia struck Sanaa International Airport and a telecommunications site in Al Mahabishah district. Twelve people were killed and 309 others were injured after King Khalid International Airport was struck by a Houthi missile, leading to the suspension of its operations. A projectile also landed near King Fahd International Airport in Dammam.

On 11 October, PLC forces claimed to have shot down a drone belonging to the Houthis on Mount Sabr, in Taiz Governorate. The Houthis said that a Saudi strike hit Sanaa International Airport, while a separate strike on a home in Sanaa killed a child and injured six others. Saudi Arabia also carrier out strikes targeting Houthi military positions and communications infrastructure in Sanaa, Saada, and Ibb governorates. PLC forces claimed to have carried out 8 airstrikes against Houthi positions in the Taiz area. Another attack hit King Khalid International Airport, killing one person and injuring 11 others. PLC forces also carried out bombing of Houthi positions on Jabal Qaymah in Marib Governorate. King Fahd International Airport was also attacked, and the Houthis claimed strikes on the Saudi Aramco sites of Tanajib and Shedgum. The Giants Brigade said that five Houthi military vehicles were destroyed near Dhubab Airport, killing their occupants. Pro-Houthi sources reported that the militia had taken control of Al-Misrakh district. The Houthis also announced that three generals from their special forces were killed during clashes in Taiz.

On 12 October, the PLC said that fighting in Taiz killed and injured dozens of people in the past 24 hours, mostly Houthis. It also confirmed that the Houthis had captured Al-Misrakh district, the Najd Qasim area, and the Wadi al-Dhabab road, bringing all four exits to Taiz city under their control. Houthis also consolidated control over eastern Jabal Habashi District. Saudi airstrikes killed ten civilians and injured 19 others in Sanaa and al-Jawf. A Houthi offensive in Al Madaribah Wa Al Arah district that aimed to sever supply lines to Kahbub and the Bab al-Mandab was repelled, although missile attacks in Ras al-Ara killed or injured a number of Yemeni soldiers. PLC sources reported that approximately 12,000 Houthis were killed or injured since Operation Dawn of Yemen began. The Deterrence Brigades, a PLC unit, claimed that, with the support of the Subaiha tribes, they succeeded in breaking the Houthi blockade on the Al-Aghbara front. Tarebh Today reported that the Southern Resistance was currently active in the Bab El-Mandeb front, Al-Dhale and Al-Subaiha. PLC forces claimed to have captured the area surrounding the Mas camp and to have taken the Al-Muqaylat and Jabal Zajar positions. Houthis claimed having attacked King Khalid International Airport and King Khalid Air Base with a missile and drone, respectively.

On 13 October, the Houthis said that Saudi strikes hit the Central Sabaha Station oil facility, belonging to the Yemen Oil Company, west of Sanaa. Strikes also hit an oil facility in Ras Isa, killing two people and injuring two others, oil facilities in Dhamar Governorate were also targeted. Houthis and government forces skirmished near al Dhabab, on 12-13 October, as houthis attempted seizing the Hangar Checkpoint, which remained contested. Houthis also launched several rounds of artillery fire into Taiz. The PLC said that it captured areas around the Maas camp in Medghal district, along with al-Muqailat and Jabal Zajjar north of Harib district. Clashes escalated in al-Shaqb, al-Aqroud, and al-Misrakh in Taiz, where Houthi attacks killed five people and injured 17 others over the past 24 hours. One person was injured in a Houthi attack on the Safwa Hospital. A Houthi missile struck the headquarters of Saudi Aramco in Dhahran, causing extensive damage. PLC forces in northwestern Marib Governorate advanced towards Baramish and from their positions near Asdas.

On 14 October, the PLC forces, supported by the Subaiha tribes, clashed with the Houthis in the Al-Aghbara, Al-Mansoura and Al-Mahawla areas. Clashes occurred between PLC forces and the Houthis in the Jabal Han area. Houthis released footage showing their forces near Murad and Ghurayrah, destroying PLC vehicles near Bab al Mandeb area and near Dhubab Airport, which they claimed to have seized, PLC disputed this claim by presenting their own footage from the airport. 14 October also marked the 63rd anniversary of the Yemeni revolution with tens of thousands of civilians answering a call for "general mobilization" by the Southern Transitional Council in exile by taking to the streets in Aden Shabwa, Hadramout, Al-Mahra and Socotra flying South Yemeni flags and issuing statements denouncing "drawing southerners into wars." In the night, the Houthis said that they struck a Saudi Eurofighter Typhoon over Saada with a surface-to-air missile.

=== 15–21 October ===
On 15 October, fighting between the Houthis and the PLC escalated in Sabir al-Mawadim district and on the outskirts of Taiz city. The PLC initially said that it repelled a Houthi attack on the strategic position of Jabal Han, west of Taiz, but later confirmed the area fell after intense fighting. It was also reported that telecommunications towers used by the Houthis in Jabal Habashi district were destroyed by airstrikes. Saudi Arabia said that it shot down a cruise missile in Medina Province and also intercepted Houthi projectiles over al Kharj, Khamis Mushait and Riyadh. The Houthis fired several missiles at Al-Maashiq Palace in Aden while prime minister Shaya al-Zindani and other cabinet members were present; five people were killed and 16 others injured, although no government officials were harmed. Houthis also attacked Marib City with at least 16 Houthi ballistic missiles and kamikaze drones. PLC forces claimed to have launched airstrikes against Houthi positions in Dhi al-Barah and Jaba'.

On 16 October, PLC forces claimed to have killed sixteen Houthi fighters and wounded others during clashes on the Al-Shaqab front, south of Taiz. The 35th Armored Brigade reported capturing a Houthi team allegedly responsible for operating drones on the Al-Aqroudh front in the Kahlan area. PLC forces repelled multiple Houthi attacks on both the Al-Shaqab and Al-Aqroudh fronts, with ongoing clashes reported. Yemeni armed forces conducted several airstrikes on Houthi positions, including at the Al-Hangar checkpoint, Maqbaba and Al-Kamil hills, and targeted a Houthi tank at Ghorab School. The Houthis fired two missiles at the Aden International Airport, which landed near its runway while a flight was taking off. Another missile targeting Yanbu was intercepted, as were two cruise missiles over the Red Sea and three drones targeting southern Saudi Arabia and Riyadh. The Chief of Staff of the 26th Infantry Brigade, Ahmed Mohammed Bahibah, died after a failed PLC infiltration attempt into the Harib district. PLC forces advanced northwest into Majzar district in Marib Governorate.

On 17 October, the SPC Ministry of Telecommunications and Information Technology reported that Saudi airstrikes that targeted telecommunications stations, towers and networks across Yemen had put up to 902 telecommunications sites and stations out of service, systematically damaging infrastructure, causing civilian casualties and depriving citizens of essential services. Houthi spokesperson Yahya Saree claimed to have shot down a Saudi reconnaissance aircraft in Hajjah Governorate. The Houthis also said they shot down a Saudi Apache helicopter over Najran Province in Saudi Arabia. PLC and Houthi forces clashed near Yemeni Army 35th Brigade’s camp and the village of Gharab, while skirmishes also occurred in Sabir al-Mawadim district, where Houthis shelled Al Aradha. PLC repelled a Houthi attack on Jabal Dhahih. Homeland Shield Forces attacked Houthi positions in Waziyah District. Saudis reported intercepting three likely Houthi drones and two missiles in Riyadh, Eastern, and Asir provinces.

On 18 October, a Saudi airstrike on a house in Sahar district killed nine people and injured 19 others. Saudi Arabia also announced that an AH-6 helicopter crashed in Najran Province due to a "technical malfunction", killing two officers, while the Houthis claimed to have shot it down. Clashes occurred near the Old Airport region and Madarat district in western Taiz, while a Houthi offensive against Al-Shaqab region was repelled. Houthi shelling also killed eight civilians and injured six others. Pro-PLC sources reported government advances in villages near Jabal Dhahih and two villages near Jabal Salih, capturing a Houthi T-55 tank.

On 19 October, a Houthi missile attack on the PLC's al-Alam military camp in Jardan district killed 73 soldiers, injured 200, and left 14 missing. Local authorities said, three ballistic missiles hit security forces during training. Houthis also claimed attacking PLC forces in Ras al Ara and Suqqayan, 20km behind the frontlines in Jabal Kahbub, using six ballistic missiles. Marib city was also attacked by a Houthi missile barrage. PLC claimed repelling a Houthi attack in al Rahan.

On 20 October, the PLC said that it conducted 744 strikes against the Houthis in the past 24 hours, "neutralizing" 200 fighters and hitting 90 combat vehicles. The Houthi missile launch platform used to attack Riyadh, was also destroyed. Skirmishes between PLC and Houthis occurred in Al Misrakh and Sabr al Madawim districts.

On 21 October, a Saudi strike on boats off al-Kadha in Taiz killed eight fishermen. The PLC said that it repelled various Houthi attacks across Taiz, where 98 militants were killed and 148 others were injured. PLC forces backed by Saudi airstrikes advanced in Misrakh District, while clashes between PLC and Houthis occurred in Murad, south of Dhubab, where PLC forces fired an ATGM at Houthi positions. The Houthis launched missiles at the Aden International Airport and the Riyan International Airport in Mukalla, while also launching drones at the Dhabba Oil Terminal. Five drones targeting Saudi Arabia, including Medina, were shot down. One Filipino national and one Nepali national were killed and one Pakistani national and one Indian national were injured by falling debris after an interception over the Shaybah oil field. Houthi shelling also hit residential areas in Bir Basha district in Taiz. A later attack on the King Fahd International Airport killed two people (a Saudi citizen and an Indian national) and injured eight others (one Saudi citizen, two Indian nationals, two Yemenis, two Bangladeshis, and one Nepalese national). The PLC claimed to have attacked vehicles belonging to the Houthis in Al-Ma'afer, Taiz.

=== 22–28 October ===
On 22 October, PLC forces claimed to have carried out 780 attacks against the Houthis in 24 hours. A houthi vessel was destroyed in an airstrike near Zuqar Island. PLC-aligned forces announced having regained full control of Al Aradi military camp, PLC forces also advanced to Jabal Manara in al Misrakh District. Saudi Arabia intercepted and destroyed four drones launched by the Houthis toward the eastern region. Saudi Arabia intercepted and destroyed a drone launched by the Houthis toward the Riyadh region. Saudi Arabia intercepted and destroyed four drones launched by the Houthis toward the Riyadh region and Madinah Al-Munawwarah region.

On 23 October, Saudi Arabia intercepted and destroyed a ballistic missile fired by the Houthis toward Najran. Saudi Arabia intercepted and destroyed two drones launched by the Houthis toward the southern region. Saudi Arabia intercepted and destroyed a ballistic missile fired by the Houthis towards Riyadh. Saudi Arabia intercepted and destroyed a ballistic missile launched by the Houthis, which had been fired toward Khamis Mushait. PLC-aligned media claimed that PLC had recaptured the Hangar Checkpoint and the entire al Misrakh district, while fighting was reported in Al Maqatirah district. PLC forces struck Sofitel hotel outside Taiz, destroying a major artillery battery, command center and two tanks.

On 24 October, Saudi Arabia intercepted and destroyed a drone launched by the Houthis in the eastern region. An air defense system in Saudi Arabia intercepted and destroyed a ballistic missile launched by the Houthis, which had been aimed toward Riyadh. Saudi Arabia intercepted and destroyed two ballistic missiles launched by the Houthis; the missiles were aimed at the cities of Taif and Yanbu. Saudi Arabia intercepted and destroyed two ballistic missiles launched by the Houthis; the missiles were aimed toward the Mecca and Medina regions. Parts of two ballistic missiles fell in Mecca, and shrapnel from the interceptions fell on Jeddah, Taif and Rabigh. A Saudi military strike targeted a migrant shelter center in Saada city within Yemen's Saada Governorate. One African migrant was killed and six others were wounded in the strike. Houthi forces launched a coordinated ground assault against the historic Al Maqta'a fortress, located in the southern governorate of Lahij. Houthi forces launched a wave of ballistic missiles targeting Aden International Airport, port in the city’s al-Tawahi district and two coast guard facilities. The strikes heavily damaged the Coast Guard headquarters in the Khor maksar district and additional facilities near Aden International Airport, which Houthi military officials claimed targeted naval assets and gatherings of PLC forces. PLC forces carried out 4 airstrikes in At-Turbah. Yemeni government forces conducted 736 military operations as part of the "Dawn of Yemen" offensive, reportedly neutralizing 307 Houthi fighters and destroying dozens of military vehicles across strategic fronts like the Taiz province.

On 25 October, Saudi Arabia intercepted and destroyed 2 drones launched by the Houthis in the Riyadh region. Saudi Arabia intercepted and destroyed a ballistic missile launched by the Houthis; the missile had been aimed at Riyadh. Saudi Arabia intercepted and destroyed a cruise missile launched by the Houthis; the missile had been aimed at Khamis Mushait. Saudi Arabia intercepted and destroyed 10 ballistic missiles launched by the Houthis; the missiles had been aimed at the southern region. The Saudi Civil Defence confirmed that falling debris from 2 Houthi ballistic missiles intercepted by Saudi air defenses over Khamis Mushait and Ahad Rafidah injured a Saudi citizen and an expatriate resident, while causing structural damage to residential buildings and vehicles. Houthi forces have advanced onto Jabal Sabr, the highly strategic mountain that directly overlooks the besieged city of Taiz. PLC and Houthi forces skirmished near al Aqroud in al Misrakh District, where Houthis also launched artillery strikes including on civilian targets, PLC forces also conducted drone drop strikes. King Khalid International Airport in Riyadh has reopened terminals 1 and 2 for domestic and international flights. The 2027 Dakar Rally in Saudi Arabia was cancelled due to regional security concerns following Houthi missile and drone attacks, with organisers planning to relocate the event. The Giants Brigades claimed the destruction of two Houthi-owned vehicles on the Al-Mudharabah front. The Yemeni Armed Forces announced that their troops have "neutralised" 218 Houthi fighters and disabled or destroyed 78 vehicles across more than 750 military operations within a 24-hour window.

On 26 October, Saudi Arabia intercepted and destroyed a ballistic missile launched by the Houthis; the missile had been aimed at Riyadh. Saudi Arabia destroyed two ballistic missile launch platforms in Sanaa. Saudi Arabia intercepted and destroyed 3 drones launched by the Houthis in the Riyadh region and the southern region. In October 2026, Houthi missile and drone strikes forced the cancellation of 86% of scheduled flights (4,071 out of 4,736) at Riyadh's King Khalid International Airport. Houthi forces launched a ballistic missile targeting King Khalid International Airport in Riyadh and conducted several drone strikes against crude oil pumping stations along Saudi Arabia’s East-West Pipeline. The Houthi movement claimed responsibility for ballistic missile attacks targeting military installations in the Yemeni governorates of Aden and Lahij. Egypt's parliament authorized President Abdel Fattah el-Sisi to deploy military support to defend Saudi Arabia against intensifying Houthi missile and drone attacks. The Saudi-led military coalition destroyed five Houthi ballistic missile storage tunnels and four launchers during a "qualitative military operation" in Yemen. Multiple explosions struck the Houthi-controlled capital of Sanaa and the Red Sea port city of Mokha, damaging local homes and the Mocha General Hospital. The Saudi-led coalition conducted over 100 air and missile strikes against Houthi military positions across Yemen, including south of Taiz. Yemeni government forces launched heavy artillery strikes against Houthi positions in the Jabal Habashi and Najd Qasim areas of the Taiz governorate as part of a broader military escalation. Southern Giants Brigades claimed to have repelled a Houthi offensive on the Al-Madaribah front in Lahj Governorate, destroying two military vehicles. PLC forces advanced near Jabal Han and Al Aqroud. Yemen's government forces conducted 1,276 military operations against Houthi positions as part of their "Dawn of Yemen" offensive, reportedly neutralizing 382 fighters amid regional coalition airstrikes.

On 27 October, Saudi Arabia intercepted and destroyed 3 ballistic missiles launched by the Houthis; the missiles had been aimed at the eastern region. Saudi Arabia intercepted and destroyed 4 drones launched by the Houthis in the southern region. Houthi claimed responsibility for a ballistic missile attack targeting Saudi Arabia's Ras Tanura oil refinery, while Saudi air defenses intercepted three missiles over the Eastern Province. Saudi Arabia intercepted and destroyed two ballistic missile launched by the Houthis; the missile had been aimed at Riyadh. Houthi military units targeted advancing pro-government forces with ballistic missiles and heavy weapons. The clash occurred from the southern direction of the strategic Bab al-Mandeb Strait, with Houthis briefly capturing parts of Jabal Kahbub, before being repelled. PLC forces also advanced into Sabr al Mawadim District. Houthi rebels claimed they launched a direct ballistic missile strike targeting the Saudi Ministry of Defence in Riyadh. Houthi forces claimed to have conducted a drone strike against Saudi Arabia's Abha International Airport as part of a coordinated wave of attacks targeting the kingdom's military and critical infrastructure. Saudi Civil Defence reported that shrapnel from two intercepted Houthi ballistic missiles fell across Riyadh. The Yemeni Armed Forces launched over 1,300 air attacks under the "Dawn of Yemen" offensive, reporting the neutralization of 440 Houthi fighters and the repelling of counter-advances along the Taiz and Bab al-Mandeb fronts. Yemeni government forces launched air strikes targeting areas of Mocha city and its port in the western Taiz province. Houthi-affiliated media reported that Yemeni government forces launched heavy air strikes targeting the Dhubab and Mocha districts of western Taiz Governorate.

On 28 October, Saudi Arabia intercepted and destroyed a ballistic missile launched by the Houthis; the missiles had been aimed at Taif. Houthi-affiliated media reported a series of airstrikes targeting the port city of Mocha and the Harf Sufyan district in Amran province, Yemen, two Houthi vessels were also destroyed in the strikes. Yemeni government forces targeted Houthi positions in Taiz and the Kahbub front in Lahij Governorate as part of the "Dawn of Yemen" operation. Houthi forces again were reported to be in control of Hangar checkpoint and launched an ATGM at a PLC tank on the outskirts of Taiz. PLC claimed to have repelled Houthi attacks south of Taiz City in al Misrakh and Sabr al Mawadim districts. Yemeni government army claim to have captured numerous strategic positions, including hilltops, during an operation in the Bab al-Mandeb area in southwestern Yemen. Yemeni government forces conducted three airstrikes targeting Houthi rebel positions in the Jabal Habashi district of Taiz governorate during the "Dawn of Yemen" military operation. Yemeni government forces launched targeted airstrikes and engaged in heavy clashes against Houthi positions in the Kahlan area south of Taiz city as part of the broader "Dawn of Yemen" military offensive. Houthi forces launched a targeted ballistic missile strike against Aden International Airport in Yemen. PLC forces alleged that Houthi forces had conducted chemical attacks on PLC forces in Kahlan and Al Aqroud. Air traffic at Yemen's Aden International Airport was suspended following a Houthi missile attack targeting adjacent Saudi-led coalition military facilities. The Giants Brigades claimed the destruction of a Houthi-owned vehicle on the Kahbub front. Yemeni government forces conducted 749 operations against the Houthi militia over 24 hours, reporting the destruction of 117 military vehicles and the neutralization of 239 Houthi commanders and fighters.

=== 29 October–4 November ===
On 29 October, Saudi Arabia intercepted and destroyed a ballistic missile launched by the Houthis; the missiles had been aimed at the eastern region. Saudi Arabia intercepted and destroyed two ballistic missiles launched by the Houthis; the missiles had been aimed at Riyadh. falling shrapnel lightly wounding one citizen and causing minor damage to a residential home. Houthis also claimed to have struck the Ras Tanura oil refinery, Abqaiq oil processing plant and the Petro Rabigh Refinery, a drone was intercepted by Saudi forces over Mecca. Houthi-affiliated media reported a series of air strikes targeting the strategic coastal districts of Dhubab and Mocha in Yemen's western Taiz governorate. World Health Organization reported that military escalations in Yemen since September had resulted in 1,677 deaths and 7,396 injuries, alongside the displacement of over 276,000 people. Yemeni government forces launched two airstrikes against a Houthi rebel training camp in the al-Ash’oub area, west of Taiz. Yemeni government forces say they repelled an attack by the Houthis on the Ras al-Naqil area on the al-Aqroudh front, south of the city of Taiz. Yemeni government forces claimed that 982 air attacks neutralized 324 Houthi fighters over the preceding 24 hours. Yemeni government forces conducted two airstrikes targeting Houthi positions in the Sabr al-Mawadim and Dhubab districts of the Taiz Governorate. PLC aligned forces also gained territory in Jabal Kahbub following Houthi withdrawal.

On 30 October, Saudi Arabia intercepted and destroyed a cruise missile launched by the Houthis; the missiles had been aimed at the western region. Saudi Arabia intercepted and destroyed a Houthi drone in the Makkah Al-Mukarramah region, which the Houthis denied targeting. Saudi Arabia intercepted and destroyed several ballistic missiles and drones launched by the Houthis that had been launched toward the provinces of Riyadh and Medina, with additional missiles fired at parts of southern Saudi Arabia, although the Houthis denied launching attacks towards the Medina region. Saudi Arabia intercepted and destroyed a drone launched by the Houthis in the eastern region.

Yemeni government forces announced airstrikes targeting a Houthi training camp west of Taiz, fighter positions in Sabr al-Mawadim, and a military vehicle in Dhubab. The Houthis have targeted the following targets:

- Ras Tanura oil refinery with a ballistic missile
- Aramco facility in Abqaiq with a missile
- King Khalid International Airport in Riyadh with multiple missiles
- King Fahd International Airport in Dammam with a drone
- Rabigh oil refinery with a ballistic missile
- Headquarters of Saudi Arabia’s troops in the Najran region

Saudi-led coalition airstrikes targeted Houthi positions in Yemen's Marib, Taiz, and Al-Jawf governorates. Yemeni government forces conducted 1,087 targeted strikes against Houthi positions as part of their "Dawn of Yemen" offensive, reportedly neutralizing 336 fighters and destroying 112 military vehicles across several provinces. Two powerful explosions rocked the southern Yemeni port city of Aden. Yemeni government forces reported that Houthi launched ballistic missiles targeting Aden International Airport and the Maashiq Presidential Palace. PLC forces, supported by Saudi air strikes, repelled Houthi assaults on al Maqatirah District and al Sawalihah. Houthi forces attempted to capture Souq al Raboua, but were stopped as Saudi strikes hit a Houthi convoy at Hayjat al Abd, destroying several Houthi vehicles.

On 31 October, Saudi Arabia intercepted and destroyed a drone launched by the Houthis in the southern region. Saudi Arabia intercepted and destroyed a drone launched by the Houthis in the Riyadh region. Fighting between Yemeni government forces and Houthi rebels decreased in the Sa’ila al-Maqatara area of Lahij Governorate. Yemeni government forces captured the strategic Huwayshian Mountain range in the Al-Jawf governorate, cutting Houthi supply lines near Al-Hazm with Saudi-led coalition air support. Yemeni government forces recaptured strategic military positions east of Al-Hazm.

On 1 November, Saudi Arabia intercepted and destroyed a ballistic missile launched by the Houthis; the missiles had been aimed at the southern region. Saudi Arabia intercepted and destroyed a drone launched by the Houthis in the southern region. The Homeland Shield Forces claimed to have attacked vehicles belonging to the Houthis in the Dahida area of Al-Jawf governorate. Two Saudi-led coalition air raids on an oil facility in the Bajil district of Yemen's Hodeidah governorate wounded at least three civilians. A Houthi drone strike on a residential area in Taiz, Yemen, killed a mother and her daughter. Houthi-affiliated media reported that two airstrikes targeted the Ras Isa port and an oil facility in Yemen's Hodeidah governorate, injuring seven people. An airstrike targeted a telecommunications network southeast of Saada, Yemen, alongside concurrent strikes on the Ras Isa oil port. Saudi airstrikes also hit a Houthi troop concentrations in Dhamar Governorate. Yemeni government forces repelled a Houthi military attack on the Kahlan front in the Sabr area, located south of Taiz. The Houthis seized Al-Maqatirah Castle following clashes, which resulted in the death of Hamza Marsh Al-Kamali, commander of the Second Brigade of the First Division of the Homeland Shield Forces. The Giants Brigades claimed to have destroyed a vehicle belonging to the Houthis on the Al-Mudharabah front. Fighting also took place in central Jawf Governorate as PLC repelled a Houthi attack on Jabal Huwayshiyan.

On 2 November, Saudi Arabia intercepted and destroyed a ballistic missile launched by the Houthis; the missiles had been aimed at the southern region. Saudi Arabia intercepted and destroyed two drones launched by the Houthis in the Riyadh. Houthi forces claimed to have targeted King Fahd International Airport in Dammam, Saudi Arabia, with two drone strikes. On the same day, sources report that the Houthi forces have advanced 80 km from Aden. Fighting had happened in Tur Al-Bahah, a military camp about 80 km away from Aden following government forces retreat in Al-Maqatirah. Saudi-led coalition airstrikes wounded seven people in Yemen's Hodeidah governorate. Four individuals injuries at the Ras Isa port, while three others were wounded in a raid on an oil facility in the Bajil district. Yemeni government forces captured the Houthi-held positions of Tabat Wathib and Habil al-Saram in Taiz province. Yemen’s internationally recognized government accused Houthi forces of launching a ballistic missile attack on the Al-Saqqiya Health Centre in the Lahij governorate, which reportedly killed five people and injured 15 others. The Yemeni Government claimed its armed forces carried out 951 military strikes over 24 hours, killing 332 Houthi fighters and destroying 56 vehicles across multiple fronts. Yemeni government forces and allied fighters recaptured the hills of Tabat Wathib and Habil al Saram Taiz Province from Houthi rebels. Yemeni government forces repelled a Houthi attack in Taiz Governorate, leaving one soldier dead and 14 others wounded. Yemeni government forces conducted targeted airstrikes against Houthi fighter positions west of Taiz. A Houthi ballistic missile strike on the Al- Saqqiya Health Center In Yemen's Lahij Governorate killed five people and injured 15 others, including medical personnel. Houthis forces advanced southeastward from Hayjat al Abd and captured Jabal Irf after capturing Souq al Roubah on November 1. PLC and Houthi forces skirmished as government forces attempted to advance at Jabal Dahida in Jawf Governorate.

On 3 November, Saudi Arabia intercepted and destroyed a drone launched by the Houthis in the Makkah Al-Mukarramah region. Yemeni government forces launched two airstrikes against Houthi military vehicles and positions in the Jabal Habashi area, located west of the city of Taiz. PLC forces claimed to have captured the Al-Khazan Al-Ahmar area in Lahej Governorate. Houthi forces launched six ballistic missiles targeting a military concentration of the Saudi-led coalition in the eastern part of Yemen's Al-Jawf governorate. Houthi claimed to hit Saudi Arabia's Abha International Airport and Khamis Mushait airbase with a drone and a ballistic missile. The leader of the Deterrence Brigades, Akram Fouad, died following the explosion of a mine in a minefield; the incident also left him and other members of the Deterrence Brigades injured. Houthi forces engaged PLC forces asouth and southeast of Souq al Roubah in al Maqatirah District, with some forces infiltrating 12km south to Al Zariqa and Al Majza, as Houthis also attempted to advance into Tur al Bahah District. PLC forces recaptured Jabal Irf from Houthi forces. PLC forces continued their advance into central Jawf Governorate with the PLC First Emergency Brigade capturing a previously Houthi-controlled position near Jabal Dahida.

On 4 November. PLC forces published video evidence of having captured positions at Jabal Dahida, following two days of Saudi airstrikes. Houthis conducted a ballistic missile strike targeting a PLC camp in Qatabah District killing 11 soldiers and wounding 60 more, Houthis also launched a missile at a staging area in southern Lahij Governorate. The Houthis claimed to have struck King Khalid International Airport, Aqfa military camp, Saudi Border Guard headquarters and a radar in Jizan Province with multiple missiles and a drone.

=== 5–11 November ===
On 5 November, PLC forces claimed to have captured the Al-Dahida mountain range in Al-Jawf Governorate, advancing till Duhaydat al Aqir, a part of the mountain range around 75km from Al Hazm. Saudi airstrikes struck Houthi forces in Al Maqatirah District, as PLC forces advanced and recaptured multiple areas in al Maqatirah District, including Hudada, Mabaq, al Zariqa and Rahab, and consolidated control over Jabal Irf, while Houthis attacked PlC positions southwest of al Maqatirah District near Jabal Kahbub. Houthis claimed to have struck King Fahd International Airport in a missile attack and Saudi forces intercepted a Houthi ballistic missile near Medina.

On 6 November, the Houthis claimed to have captured positions on the Khabub front, near the Bab al-Mandeb strait. PLC forces advanced further in the Jabal Dahida mountain range, seizing more positions and also captured Wadi Halhalan. A Houthi drone was intercepted by Saudi forces near Mecca while two ballistic missiles were intercepted near Najran, a drone and cruise missile launched at Riyadh were also intercepted.

On 7 November, the Fourth Military Region attacked a military vehicle belonging to the Houthis in Al-Madharib, near the Bab al-Mandeb Strait. Airstrikes hit residential homes in al-Shariya village, Bani Hushaysh District, northeast of Sanaa. Yemen's Health Ministry initially reported 27 people killed and 36 injured, before later revising the toll to 33 killed and 39 wounded. The Houthis blamed the strikes on Saudi Arabia. Reuters said it could not independently verify the ministry's account, while Saudi Arabia's Center for International Communication said it was investigating the incident. PLC forces kept advancing along the Jabal Dahida mountain range while disarming Houthi IEDs and landmines, and also repelled Houthi assaults on Wadi Halhalan with airstrikes destroying Houthi positions in the sector. Houthis claimed having targeted Aramco storage tanks and a distillation tower at King Khalid International Airport, Aramco facilities in Eastern Province, a gas pumping station in Riyadh and a National Guard camp in Najran using ballistic missiles.

On 8 November, the Homeland Shield Forces claimed to have captured positions on the Khabub front, near the Bab al-Mandeb Strait. PLC and Houthi forces engaged in combat in al Majza, and Saudi airstrikes hit Houthi positions on Jabal Munif and Jabal Irf in al Maqatirah District. PLC and Houthi fighters also fought against one another in Wadi Halhalan in Raghwan District, and Houthis claimed targeting PLC troop concentrations southeast of Wadi Halhalan in Medghal District using missiles and drones. The Houthis claimed to have again attacked King Khalid International Airport and Aramco storage tanks in Riyadh and an Aramco facility in Abqaiq, as Saudi forces intercepted three missiles over Riyadh Province and one over Eastern Province. The Aramco office building in Riyadh’s financial district was damaged in these strikes.

On 9 November, the Houthis captured the city of Al-Majza'a in Lahej Governorate, with Southern Giants Brigade contesting this claim. PLC sources claimed to have expelled Houthi fighters from their remaining positions in Jabal Dahida, and engaged Houthi fighters near the Mas military camp. PLC forces also claimed to have captured Jabal al Kab. Saudi forces struck three ballistic missile production facilities in Sanaa and the Hodeidah International Airport. East-West Pipeline in Medina Province was also targeted by projectiles. Syria under Ahmed al-Sharaa confirmed that it was sending troops to Saudi Arabia as aid against the Houthis, the troops consisting of military advisers and 600 special forces.

On 10 November, PLC forces claimed to have full control of the Khabub Mountains after repelling a Houthi infiltration. PLC and Houthi forces fought one another in Mabaq. Saudi forces struck the Yemen Petroleum Company (YPC) headquarters and a fuel station in Sanaa. Houthis claimed attacks on King Khalid International Airport, a "financial hub' in Riyadh, multiple East-West Pipeline pumping stations, and an Aramco facility in Abqaiq, while Saudi forces downed two missiles near Riyadh, one in the Eastern Province and a drone in southern Saudi Arabia. Houthis also fired three ballistic missiles at Marib City.

On 11 November, Southern Resistance and the PLC cooperated to seize Jabal al-Nasirah and al-Mamdar from Houthi forces. The Houthis claimed to have attacked an operations room in Al-Buraiqa, Aden. Houthis also fired missile salvos towards PLC staging areas in Ras al Arah and Kharaz, followed bh an attempted advance toward al Shatt and al Sarih, which was repelled. Saudi airstrikes targeted Houthi forces in al Majza and also destroyed a Houthi column including an electronic warfare vehicle in al Shamayatayn District. PLC forces disarmed two IEDs on the Marib-al Abr Road. Houthis claimed to have attacked King Khalid International Airport and an oil pumping station in Yanbu, while Saudi air defenses intercepted three Houthi cruise missiles near Riyadh, a drone over Mecca Province, and another over southern Saudi Arabia.

=== 12—18 November ===
On 12 November, PLC forces claimed to have carried out 703 operations against Houthi-held positions. Houthis launched an offensive towards Jabal Kharaz, capturing al-Shatt and the Al-Sarih crossing, which was followed by PLC-Saudi airstrikes on al Shatt. Houthis targeted PLC staging areas in Jawf and Marib governorates with two ballistic missiles. Houthis claimed to have struck a military cargo plane at the Sharura Airport, using a drone, as Houthis also claimed attacks on an Aramco facility in Riyadh, the Yanbu Oil Refinery, and a pumping station on the East-West Pipeline.

On 13 November, the PLC forces aided by the Support and Reinforcement Brigades recaptured both al Shatt and al Sarih. Homeland Shield Forces launched counteroffensives against Houthis in Madaribah wa al Arah District. Saudi airstrikes targeted Houthi forces in al Turbah and Houthi logistics in al Maqatirah and al Shamayatayn districts. Houthis claimed an attack on an East-West Pipeline pumping station with drones for a second time, while Saudi forces intercepted a Houthi drone near Riyadh and two drones in Eastern Province.

On 15 November, PLC forces withdrew from the Bab al-Mandeb Strait and redeployed towards Aden. The Houthis claimed to have advanced on the fronts in the districts of Al-Mudharabah and Al-Arah. The Houthis released 600 PLC fighters who had been captured by the Houthis following the restart of the fighting in July. According to the International Committee of the Red Cross, which oversaw the transfer, the release was the largest single unilateral prisoner exchange of the conflict.

On 16 November, PLC forces claimed to have carried out 661 operations against Houthi-held positions.

On 17 November, clashes broke out between the Houthis and PLC forces in the districts of al-Maqatirah and Tur al-Bahah.

=== 19 November–present ===
On 19 November, PLC forces claimed to have repelled a Houthi attack on the Al-Aqroud and Kahlan fronts.

On 20 November, the Saudi-led coalition lunched multiple air strikes across the governorates of Hodeidah, Sanaa, Saada, and Taiz. Airstrikes on Hodeidah Port targeted what the Saudi-led coalition called "smuggling and weapons-transporting operations". The Houthis reported 41 killed from coalition strikes in the past 24 hours. On the same day the coalition reported five drones and three ballistic missiles were intercepted with debris falling in the Al-Shuqaiq area in Jazan province.

On 21 November, the PLC claimed to have repelled a Houthi attack at Jabal Han and the old Taiz Airport.

== Foreign involvement ==
=== Pro-Houthis ===
The Iranian Islamic Revolutionary Guard Corps (IRGC) reportedly guided and armed the Houthi offensive in an effort to open a new front in the 2026 Iran war. Saudi-backed government sources claimed that the offensive across the Tihamah, the plains of Yemen's Red Sea coast, was led by IRGC Quds Force officer Abdolreza Shahlaei. There are reportedly hundreds of IRGC officers stationed in Yemen to support Houthi operations, aiming to close the Strait of Bab al-Mandab. The Yemeni National Resistance claimed that it seized documents from the laptop of a captured Houthi commander that detailed a four-stage plan by the IRGC to capture the Bab al-Mandab. Nevertheless, the Iranian government denied any involvement in the conflict. Iran Foreign Affairs spokesperson Esmail Baghaei said that the Houthis are independent actors with their own interests.

According to the National Resistance, the bodies of several fighters from al-Shabaab, a militant group based in Somalia, were recovered among Houthi casualties during the clashes and identified using personal documents and belongings. Although the claim was not independently verified, cooperation between the Houthis and al-Shabaab has been recorded since at least 2023, according to The Wall Street Journal.

=== Pro-PLC and Saudi Arabia ===
According to CNN, over 100 American military advisers who were stationed in Saudi Arabia weeks earlier due to signs that Iran was increasing aid to the Houthis were providing intelligence support to the Saudi military during the offensives. The support included a targeting tool that was compared to Project Maven as well as geospatial intelligence for strikes against the militia. US president Donald Trump rejected a request by Saudi leader Mohammed bin Salman to strike the Houthis.

According to Lebanese newspaper Al Akhbar, citing American officials, Israeli prime minister Benjamin Netanyahu offered to join a regional effort against the Houthis in support of countries in the Arabian peninsula. Additionally, Israeli news outlet Maariv was closely monitoring Houthi movements following the capture of Mokha. On 15 September, Walla! reported that Saudi Arabia sought Israeli intelligence support in talks mediated by the United States Central Command. The Israel Defense Forces advised Israel's leadership not to conduct strikes on the Houthis or other actions that would militarily involve Israel in the conflict.

Turkish media reported that Pakistan was considering airstrikes against the Houthis under the Mecca Defence Alliance. Pakistani defense minister Khawaja Asif warned on 9 September that the Houthi attacks on Saudi Arabia could activate the pact. Pakistan said on 10 September that there were no talks regarding military actions, but that the country would act "when the time comes." A condemnation of the Houthi attacks was made by Pakistani Prime Minister Shehbaz Sharif on 13 September, the Saudi Press Agency reported. Pakistan's DG ISPR Ahmed Sharif Chaudhry stated that Pakistan "stands with Saudi Arabia".

On 17 September, Reuters reported that China was seeking to pressure Iran to reign in the Houthis and help prevent the conflict spreading further across energy routes on which China depends. It reporters that Iran responded by saying that stability and peace in the region depend on ending the Iran war.

Following talks between Egypt and Saudi Arabia about the Bab al-Mandab Strait crisis and the broader Houthi–Saudi conflict. The Egyptian House of Representatives had an emergency session regarding support for Saudi Arabia in the Yemeni conflict, With the Egyptian president El-Sisi pledging full support for the defence of Saudi Arabia against the Houthis"

Saudi Arabia requested military support from the United Kingdom for both repelling the Bab al-Mandab offensive and defending Saudi oil infrastructure from Houthi attacks. British prime minister Andy Burnham reportedly agreed to sending military advisers to Saudi Arabia. High-level officials from multiple regional states said Turkey planned to offer indirect military aid to Saudi Arabia, but not support for offensive operations. Pakistan rejected the NYT's claims about Pakistani aircraft used in airstrikes against Houthis.

== Aftermath ==
=== Camp Lemonnier ===
The Houthi capture of coastal territories bordering the Strait of Bab al-Mandab brought Houthi positions on Perim Island within approximately 80 miles (130 km) of US-run Camp Lemonnier in Djibouti, posing possible strategic risks for the base's future.

=== Wartime displacements ===
On 13 September, the Djiboutian Economic Minister Ilyas Moussa Dawaleh reported that approximately 2,000+ Yemeni refugees arrived in Djibouti within 24 hours. Among the arrivals, 500 evacuees reached Obock, including women and children rescued at sea after their boats ran out of fuel. On 19 September, Al Jazeera reported that over 2,700 people fled to Djibouti.

As of 20 October 2026, the UN reported that more than 250,000 people were displaced because of the renewed conflict.

=== Humanitarian crisis ===
Hunger in Yemen is rapidly worsening due to escalating conflict, resulting in 18.3 million people facing acute food insecurity and 2.2 million children under five being acutely malnourished. The World Food Programme reported that higher food prices and disrupted markets leave families unable to meet basic needs, forcing them to rely on limited, unhealthy food.

Road closures and insecurity are preventing vital supplies, including fuel, from reaching besieged Taiz, pushing the health system toward collapse due to shortages of electricity and medical oxygen. Food and fuel prices have more than doubled, while water production has been cut in half. Human Rights Watch accused the Houthis of showing "utter disregard for civilian lives" by cutting off the supply of medicine, food and water to residents of Taiz.

=== Mecca Agreement ===
Some analysts noted that the Yemen conflict failed to activate the recently-concluded Mecca Agreement, including defensive action by Turkey or Pakistan, suggesting that the agreement was being violated. However, others noted that the pact requires parliamentary sanction in those nations, but can be approved by decree in Saudi Arabia. Turkish officials also said the terms of the agreement, such as military interoperability, could take a few years to be fully implemented. As of 16 September, Pakistan said it did not know whether it had been approached by Saudi Arabia for aid. On 5 October the three countries agreed to enact the defense pact as a deterrence measure against Houthi attacks on Saudi Arabia.

== Casualties ==
Country	Deaths	Injured	Source
Yemen	2,260+ Yemenis	10,519+ Yemenis	United Nations
Saudi Arabia	7 Saudis		
Saudi Arabia	3 Bangladeshis		
Saudi Arabia	2 Indians		
Saudi Arabia	2 Sudanese		
Saudi Arabia	1 Algerian		
Saudi Arabia	1 American		
Saudi Arabia	1 Egyptian		
Saudi Arabia	1 Filipino		
Saudi Arabia	1 Jordanian		
Saudi Arabia	1 Moroccan		
Saudi Arabia	1 Nepalese		
Saudi Arabia	1 Palestinian		
Saudi Arabia	1 Syrian		
Saudi Arabia	1 Yemeni		

== Analysis ==
While the Houthis have sensed an opportunity to advance by exploiting the regional chaos and global economic turmoil unleashed by the Iran war, according to NYU professor and Near Eastern studies expert Mohamad Bazzi, Trump has decided to avoid direct intervention in the Houthi-Saudi conflict, seemingly acknowledging that over a decade of bombing campaigns has failed to force them into submission. Gregory D. Johnsen of the Arab Gulf States Institute describes the anti-Houthi coalition as a disparate, incoherent group whose clashing internal goals lead them to fight each other more than the Houthis. Mohammed Al-Qadhi, a political analyst, believes that the Houthis benefit from disagreements and infighting within the Saudi-backed government. Ahmad Dahshan, editor-in-chief of the Center for Arabic Eurasian Studies, argues that the memory of Egypt's intervention in Yemen in 1960, which led to deaths of thousands of Egyptian soldiers, has made it difficult for the country to back Saudi Arabia. Mohammed al-Qadhi, an independent Yemeni analyst of politics and conflict, believes that the Saudi-backed Yemeni government has enough fighters, but lacks economic support, logistics, and a centralized command system.

== See also ==
- 2026 Mali offensives
- United States–Saudi strikes on Iraqi militias
