= 2026 Houthi attacks on Saudi airports =

Missile and drone attacks by the Houthis

- Part of the Houthi–Saudi conflict and the 2026 Yemen offensives
- CCTV footage of the missile strike on King Khalid International Airport on 10 October
- 2026 Houthi attacks on Saudi airports (Saudi Arabia)
- Location: Abha, Riyadh and Dammam, Saudi Arabia
- Date: 6–21 October
- Target: Abha International Airport; King Khalid International Airport; King Fahd International Airport
- Attack type: Ballistic missile attack, drone attack
- Weapons: Ballistic missiles, one-way attack drones
- Deaths: 23 total: 1 killed in Riyadh, 2 in Abha (6–7 October); 3 killed in Riyadh (8 October); 14 killed in Riyadh (10 October); 1 killed in Riyadh (11 October); 2 killed in Dammam (21 October)
- Injuries: 383+ total: 8 injured in Riyadh, 28 in Abha (6–7 October); 20+ injured in Riyadh (8 October); 308 injured in Riyadh (10 October); 11 injured in Riyadh (11 October); 8 injured in Dammam (21 October)
- Perpetrator: Houthis

In October 2026, the Houthis in Yemen launched a series of ballistic missile and drone attacks on three airports in Saudi Arabia, killing 23 people and injuring more than 380 others. It is the deadliest series of attacks in the country since the Qatif and Dammam mosque bombings in May 2015, and is the deadliest of the attacks on the Gulf Arab states since the beginning of the 2026 Iran war.

== Background ==
As part of the Saudi-led intervention in Yemen during the Yemeni civil war, Saudi Arabia has bombed the Houthi-held capital city of Sanaa several times since 2015. This included an attack on Sanaa International Airport on 13 July 2026 to prevent the landing of an Iranian Mahan Air flight loaded with passengers and dignitaries returning from the funeral of Iranian Supreme Leader Ali Khamenei, who had been killed on the first day of the 2026 Iran war. That attack reignited the Houthi–Saudi conflict, prompting the Houthis to end the UN-brokered truce initiated in 2022, impose a blockade on Saudi Arabia, and launch large-scale offensives.

The escalation occurred amid the longstanding conflict between the Houthis and the Saudi-led coalition, which has imposed restrictions on access to Yemen since March 2015. These restrictions included limitations on air and sea traffic as well as commercial imports. Human Rights Watch and United Nations experts have stated that these measures contributed to shortages of food, fuel, and medicine, thereby worsening conditions for civilians.

On 13 July 2026, Yemeni government forces, in coordination with Saudi Arabia, conducted airstrikes on Sanaa International Airport. The government stated that the strikes aimed to prevent an Iranian aircraft from landing. Human Rights Watch's analysis of satellite imagery revealed that three munitions struck the airport's only operational runway. Subsequently, the Houthis announced a naval blockade against Saudi Arabia, describing it as retaliation for what they termed the blockade of Yemen.

Fighting intensified again in October when Saudi-backed Yemeni government forces launched a counteroffensive near the Bab al-Mandeb Strait. The Houthis stated that their attacks on Saudi airports and oil facilities were retaliatory measures in response to Saudi airstrikes in Yemen. Meanwhile, the Saudi-led coalition condemned the Houthi attacks and continued its military operations against Houthi forces.

== Attacks ==
The attacks followed an escalation of tensions earlier in July. On 13 July, after Saudi-led airstrikes struck Sanaa International Airport, the Houthis launched missile and drone attacks on Abha International Airport and warned airlines against flying in Saudi airspace until restrictions on Sanaa Airport were lifted. This warning came nearly three months before the October attacks.

On 6 and 7 October 2026, a combined missile and drone attack killed one Sudanese national and injured eight civilians at King Khalid International Airport. The Abha International Airport was also attacked, killing two women from Algeria and Morocco and wounding 28 other people.

HZ-ASI, the Saudia Airbus A321-200 reportedly destroyed at King Khalid International Airport in the attacks.

On 8 October, two attacks targeted King Khalid International Airport, destroying a Saudia Airbus A321-200 aircraft, while also damaging two nearby aircraft, including a Saudia Airbus A321neo. The first attack hit the airport facilities, while the second hit the aircraft. Saudi Arabia's General Authority of Civil Aviation said three Saudi citizens, including a pilot of the aircraft, were killed and dozens of people "of different nationalities" were wounded. The Houthis claimed they had fired a ballistic missile at the airport. Hundreds of flights were cancelled due to the attacks, while airlines including Air India, Akasa Air (except Dammam), Lufthansa and Pakistan International Airlines suspended services to Riyadh. Airport operations returned to normal the following day.

On 10 October, the Houthis carried out another ballistic missile strike on the King Khalid International Airport, hitting a complex containing terminals 3 and 4. Surveillance and closed-circuit footage from the scene captured the moment of the impact, showing a bright orange flash and subsequent explosion that caved in sections of the ceiling, shattered glass facades and scattered heavy debris across a dust-filled terminal hall where religious pilgrims and travelers were queued at departure gates. Twelve people were initially killed, including four Saudis, two citizens of Bangladesh and one person each from the United States, Jordan, Palestine, Syria, Sudan, and Egypt; two Indian men died from their injuries during the following days. Another 308 people were injured and airport operations were suspended again. The Bangladeshi Ministry of Foreign Affairs reported that among the killed was a mufti and 24 of the injured were Bangladeshi. The attack also damaged the nose of a Riyadh Air Boeing 787 after debris struck the aircraft.

On 11 October, terminal 4 of King Khalid International Airport was struck again, starting a fire in one of its passenger halls. A Pakistani resident died and 11 people were injured. In the Eastern Province, King Fahd International Airport in Dammam was also attacked, with no information of casualties reported.

On 12 October, the Houthis fired three ballistic missiles, one being launched toward King Khalid airport; all three were intercepted by Saudi Arabia.

On 21 October, King ‌Fahd airport was hit by a new attack launched from Yemen, killing one Saudi and one Indian national, with eight others being injured.

== Reactions ==
=== Saudi Arabia ===
Coalition spokesperson Turki al-Maliki called the 10 October attack a "full-fledged war crime" and a "cowardly terrorist attack by the terrorist Houthi militia" which "resulted in deaths and injuries among civilian passengers and airport staff", vowing to "respond decisively to this terrorist attack in accordance with the Customary International Humanitarian Law".

At the WPC Energy Congress event in Riyadh on 11 October, Minister of Energy Prince Abdulaziz bin Salman Al Saud warned of a "serious response" to the attacks.

On 12 October, a notice by the General Authority of Civil Aviation was issued that extended the closure of King Khalid International Airport until 21:00 GMT (00:00 AST) on 17 October.

=== Houthis ===
Houthi official Mohammed al-Bukhaiti claimed Houthi responsibility for the attacks. Al-Bukhaiti stated that they were in retaliation for Saudi strikes on civilian infrastructure in Yemen, carried out "so that the world understands that airports, seaports, weddings and mourning halls, hospitals, and markets in Yemen are civilian facilities that must not be targeted or harmed—and that the same rules that apply to these facilities in Yemen must also apply to their counterparts everywhere else". Houthi military spokesman Yahya Saree issued a warning to all airline companies to not use Saudi airports, stating that the Houthis "reiterate their warning against using Saudi airports and airspace", as "they are potential targets and sites for operation by our forces, with the exceptions of the airports of Makkah and Madina". (Note: Mecca and Medina are the two most sacred cities in Islam and have particularly stringent expectations of behavior; violence is taboo.)

=== United Nations ===
On 11 October, Secretary-General António Guterres strongly condemned the "lethal attack by the Houthis" and said he was "deeply shocked" by the incident, adding that the attacks on civilian infrastructure violated international law and "must cease immediately". UN special envoy for Yemen Hans Grundberg said the attacks on civilian airports in Saudi Arabia constituted "a grave escalation" and posed "a serious threat to regional security, perpetuates cycles of violence, and complicate even more peace efforts for Yemen".

=== Iran and its allies ===
Iran offered to mediate the conflict between its Houthi allies and Saudi Arabia. Foreign minister Abbas Araghchi stated that Iran is "ready to provide any assistance to help initiate a dialogue" between the two sides. Iranian foreign ministry spokesperson Esmail Baghaei expressed concern over the strikes and said that such "continued escalation will only benefit the Israeli regime, and we do not want hostilities to continue between two Muslim countries", as well as condemning the blockade of Yemen since 2015.

Kata'ib Hezbollah praised the Houthi strikes on Saudi Arabia. Kata'ib Hezbollah called on Saudi crown prince Mohammed bin Salman to "accept defeat and lift the unjust blockade on the people of Yemen", while it offered congratulations for "their military operations to defend the dignity of their people and their usurped rights, following the siege imposed upon them by the Saudi regime". Kata'ib Hezbollah also dismissed the Iraqi government's condemnation of the Houthi attacks on Saudi Arabia as "discordant voices" that did not speak for Iraqis.

=== United States ===
President Donald Trump condemned the attack as "terrible" and "not acceptable" and said the U.S. would "make a decision" about possibly intervening in the conflict, adding that he will be speaking to Crown Prince Mohammed bin Salman. Secretary of State Marco Rubio strongly condemned the "reprehensible attacks" on King Khalid International Airport, as well as other Houthi attacks on Saudi Arabia, noting that a U.S. citizen had been killed.

American professional wrestling promotion WWE said they would still host their Crown Jewel premium live event at the Riyadh Season Stadium on November 7, despite fears of WWE staff. On October 28, Riyadh Season announced that Crown Jewel would be relocated from an outdoor arena into an indoor arena.

=== Others ===
The attacks were additionally condemned by the African Union, the Arab League, Australia, Bahrain, Bangladesh, Canada, Chile, China, Egypt, the European Union, Germany, India, Iraq, Israel, Japan, Jordan, Kuwait, Lebanon, Malaysia, Oman, Pakistan, Palestine, the Philippines, Poland, Qatar, Sierra Leone, Singapore, Syria, the United Arab Emirates, the United Kingdom, and the internationally recognized government of Yemen.

A spokesperson from the Southern Resistance in Yemen, named Ali Shaif Al-Hariri, at the time active in the conflict, condemned the attack on Saudi soil.

=== Travel advisories and warnings ===
Cautions against traveling to Saudi Arabia were issued by Canada, Japan, Poland, South Korea, New Zealand, the United Kingdom, and the United States.

== See also ==
- 2018 Riyadh missile strike
- 2019 Abha International Airport attacks
- 2020 Riyadh drone and missile attack
- 2022 Jeddah missile attack
- 2022 Abu Dhabi attack
- 2026 in Saudi Arabia
- Abqaiq–Khurais attack
