= 2026 Marib campaign =

Part of the 2026 Yemen offensives during the Yemeni civil war

2026 Marib Campaign
- Part of the 2026 Yemen offensives during the Yemeni civil war (2014–present)
Date	3 September 2026 – present
Location	Marib Governorate, Yemen
Status	Ongoing
Territorial changes	PLC forces recapture strategic hills and positions around Maas Camp, al-Muqailat, and Jabal Zajjar in northern/western Marib.

Belligerents
(Yemen) Presidential Leadership Council: Pro-government Marib tribesmen; Saudi Arabia (air support)	(Yemen) Supreme Political Council: Houthis

Commanders and leaders
(Yemen) Rashad al-Alimi; (Yemen) Sagheer Aziz; (Yemen) Sultan al-Arada; (Saudi Arabia) Turki al-Maliki	(Yemen) Abdul-Malik al-Houthi; (Yemen) Muhammad al-Atifi; (Yemen) Yusuf al-Madani; (Yemen) Jarallah al-Sharif †; (Yemen) Yahya Saree

Casualties and losses
Unknown	Unknown
- Multiple civilians killed and injured in Marib City and IDP camps by Houthi ballistic missile and artillery shelling (including 2 children killed and 15 injured on 8 September); Part of 340,000+ civilians displaced nationwide since August 2026

The fragile peace in Yemen shattered following the outbreak of the 2026 Yemen offensives. Initially, focused on the Bab el Mandab and surrounding area, where the Houthis successfully captured Mokha and rest of the Bab el Mandab by the 11th of September. This was followed by continuous clashes and especially the forces of the PLC and the Houthis clashed in the governorate of Marib.

The Marib Governorate has served as a bloody and devastating battlefield for both sides of the Yemeni Civil War. The Marib campaign has up until now, led to displacement of thousands of civilians.

== Background ==
The country of Yemen has served as an epicentre of an ongoing, bloody civil war between the PLC supported by the Saudis and the SPC led by the Houthis.
