= Bab al-Mandab Strait crisis =

2026 Houthi offensive

- Part of the Red Sea crisis (Houthi blockade of Saudi Arabia), the Yemeni civil war, and the spillover of 2026 Iran war
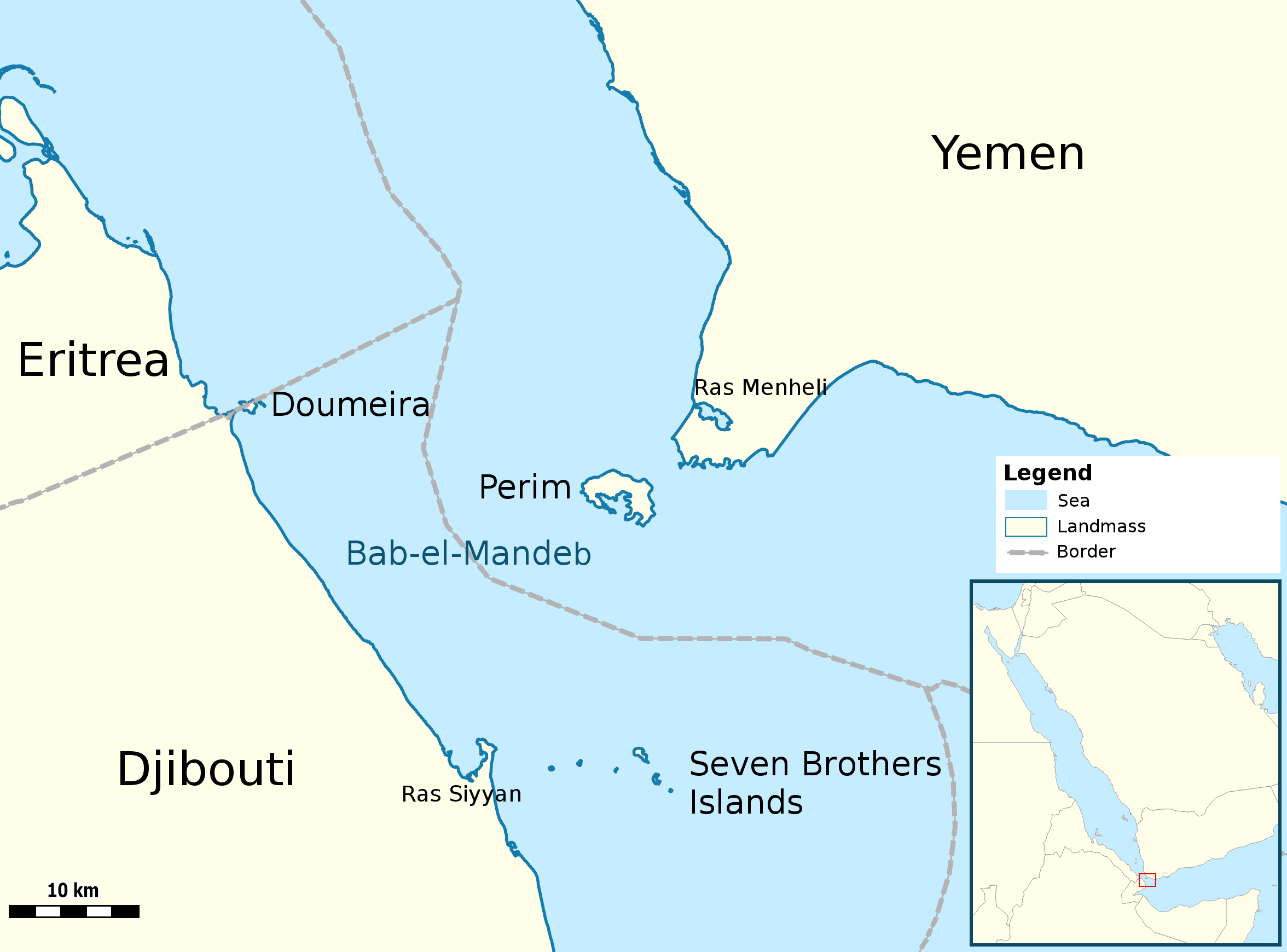
- Date: 10 September 2026 – present (1 month, 2 weeks and 4 days)
- Location: Western coast of Yemen and the Bab al-Mandab Strait
- Cause: 2026 Yemen offensives
- Participants: Saudi Arabia; Yemen (PLC); Houthis

The Bab al-Mandab Strait crisis is an escalation that began in September 2026 as part of the wider Yemeni offensives tied to the 2026 Iran war, in which Yemen's Houthis launched an offensive to seize control of the Bab al-Mandab Strait, a global choke point. Houthi fighters seized the historic Red Sea port city of Mokha, pushing further along the Yemeni coast toward the strait, with Houthi troops moving onto the Hanish Islands in the middle of the Red Sea. The Houthis declared a blockade targeting Saudi Arabian shipping and announced the strait closed to specific vessels, driving global oil prices above $100 a barrel.

As of mid-September 2026, Houthi forces captured Yemen's entire Red Sea coastline, Perim Island, and the Hanish Islands, giving them strategic control over the Bab al-Mandab Strait, the narrow sea lane connecting the Red Sea to the Gulf of Aden.

On 5 October 2026, Yemeni media claimed that the PLC recaptured Mokha and resecured access to the Bab al-Mandab Strait, seemingly ending the crisis. However, the Houthis denied this.

== Background ==
The Bab al-Mandab Strait connects the Red Sea with the Gulf of Aden and the Indian Ocean and is a critical trade artery, handling nearly 10 percent of global trade and roughly 5 to 7 percent of global oil shipments; threats and attacks in the strait can force commercial vessels and oil tankers to reroute around Africa's Cape of Good Hope, adding weeks of travel time and higher costs. The strait's strategic importance had increased dramatically because Iran's closure of the Strait of Hormuz amid the 2026 Iran war had forced Saudi Arabia to rely far more heavily on its Red Sea export route; between March and mid-July 2026, Saudi seaborne crude exports through Bab al-Mandab were eight times higher than during the same period in 2025. Fighting between the Houthis and Saudi-backed government forces had reignited in July 2026, after roughly four years of relative calm under a UN-brokered truce, and intensified through August and September as the group shifted its focus from northern Yemen to control of the country's long coastline. Ahmed Nagi, a senior analyst at the International Crisis Group, said control of the strait held importance in the Houthis' broader strategy beyond territorial gain on the ground.

== Events ==
On 10 September 2026, Houthi forces captured the districts of Hays and Al Khawkhah district in Hodeidah province, as well as the town of Mocha in western Taiz province, following rapid advances. The Presidential Leadership Council (PLC) said its forces had retreated toward the Dhubab district near the Bab al-Mandab strait. Later that day, reports emerged that the Houthis had also reached the Hanish Islands in Hodeidah governorate, amid unverified claims that they had captured the strategically located Dhubab district and Perim island in the Bab al-Mandab strait itself. By mid-September, the Houthis' rapid advance had brought them to within about 20 mi (32 km) of the US military base in Djibouti, across the strait, and the International Organization for Migration said more than 82,000 people had been displaced by the fighting since the start of September.

As of mid-September 2026, Houthi forces control Yemen's entire Red Sea coastline, Perim Island, and the Hanish Islands, giving them strategic control over the Bab al-Mandab Strait, the narrow sea lane connecting the Red Sea to the Gulf of Aden.

=== Attacks on Saudi Arabia ===
As the ground offensive advanced, the Houthis intensified missile and drone attacks on Saudi Arabia. On 8 September 2026, Houthi forces struck the Saudi cities of Abha, Khamis Mushait, Jizan and Najran, hitting civilian and economic sites, including Jazan City for Primary and Downstream Industries and King Khalid Air Base, and wounding at least 73 people, among them women and children. The Houthi military said the attacks were in response to more than 100 Saudi airstrikes in Yemen over the preceding three days, and said it had fired "dozens of ballistic missiles and drones". Saudi Arabia's Energy Ministry said the strikes had also triggered fires at multiple oil installations and utility sites across the kingdom's southern provinces. On 10 September, Saudi authorities activated air-raid alerts in Abha and the Khamis Mushait region warning residents to take shelter, though the alerts were quickly lifted and Saudi officials said there was no danger. On 13 September, the Houthis claimed responsibility for a further attack on a military base in southern Saudi Arabia.

== Reactions ==
Saudi-led coalition spokesman Major-General Turki al-Maliki said the coalition would "resolutely confront" the Houthis' "hostile approach" and vowed a response under the kingdom's right to self-defense. The Saudi Foreign Ministry said on X that "the kingdom affirms its legitimate right to take all necessary measures to defend its sovereignty". A source familiar with Saudi thinking told CNN that Riyadh was planning to retaliate and had informed allies of its plans, and that the kingdom was working to bring other countries, some previously wary of being seen as joining the US war with Iran, into efforts to push back against the Houthis. Houthi military spokesperson Brigadier General Yahya Saree blamed Saudi Arabia for the escalation, warning that "every aggression against our country and people will be met with a firm response," while Nasruddin Amer, deputy head of the Houthi media office, said "the Saudi enemy has to understand that the time for committing crimes and massacres against the Yemeni people without response, deterrence or paying a price has ended".

== Impact ==
Analysts warned that a Houthi campaign against shipping in Bab al-Mandab could open a second maritime front in a conflict that had already choked off traffic through the Strait of Hormuz, adding further pressure to global energy markets and supply chains. Oil prices rose more than $3 at the market open on 14 September, following new strikes on Saudi Arabia and on ships in the Persian Gulf, with Brent crude futures rising to $108.23 a barrel.

== See also ==
- Houthi blockade of Saudi Arabia
- 2026 Strait of Hormuz crisis
