= 2026 Sanaa airport strike =

Military conflict

- Part of the 2026 Iran war, Yemeni civil war, and Middle Eastern crisis
Date	13 July 2026
Location	Sanaa International Airport, Sanaa, Yemen 15°28′43″N 44°13′11″E
Status	Sanaa International Airport runway damaged but repaired soon after; Iranian aircraft diverted to Hodeidah; Houthis strike Saudi Arabia in retaliation and unilaterally end the 2022 truce; Resumption and escalation of the Houthi-Saudi Arabian conflict

Belligerents
Yemen (Pro-PLC Government); Saudi Arabia	(Yemen) Supreme Political Council (Houthis); Supported by: Iran

Commanders and leaders
Rashad al-Alimi; Turki al-Maliki	Mahdi al-Mashat; Abdul-Malik al-Houthi

Units involved
Yemeni Air Force; Royal Saudi Air Force	Yemeni Air Force

Casualties and losses
None	None

On 13 July 2026, the internationally recognized Yemeni government struck Sanaa International Airport. The strikes were attributed to Saudi Arabia by the Houthis and many international sources. The airstrikes occurred amidst Houthi involvement in the 2026 Iran war and increased tensions in the Middle East, and was a serious escalation of the ongoing Yemeni civil war.

The Yemeni government said that they struck the airport to prevent an Iranian plane carrying an Iranian-Houthi delegation to land on the airport, though the aircraft later successfully landed at the Hodeidah International Airport of Yemen. The strike led to further straining of relations between the Saudis and Houthis. Due to the strikes, the Houthis declared the ceasefire 'over', warning Saudi Arabia of repercussions and Abdul-Malik al-Houthi delivered a televised address stating that Saudi Arabia will be "punished".

Shortly after the attacks, the Houthis struck the Abha International Airport of Saudi Arabia though Saudi air defenses downed most of the drones and missiles used in the attack.

== Background ==
The Yemeni civil war has been ongoing since 2014, following the Yemeni revolution in 2011, which began following the Houthi takeover of the capital Sanaa and other populated places in Northern Yemen. The civil war saw an intervention by Saudi Arabia and allied forces in support of anti-Houthi forces. The Houthis have been widely regarded as a proxy force of Iran and part of the so-called Axis of Resistance. A ceasefire was reached in 2022 between the warring sides and tensions remained low.

Amidst the escalating crisis in the Middle East, violence in Yemen flared up once again in late 2025 when the United Arab Emirates-backed STC launched an offensive against the PLC Yemen which led to the 2025–2026 southern Yemen campaign, which eventually led to the dissolving of the STC and the Emirati forces to retreat from Yemen.

In July 2026, the Houthis and the PLC government engaged in clashes in Yemen with heavy clashes reported in Marib, Hays and Hodeidah. This occurred as an Iranian plane entered Yemeni airspace to land at the Sana'a airport on 3 July 2026.

== Strike ==
On 13 July, the Yemeni government declared that they had struck Sanaa International Airport to prevent an Iranian plane from landing at the airport. The captured footage show four consecutive blasts occurred that cratered the main runway tarmac to guarantee the incoming Iranian flight couldn't land. Thick smoke plumes rose from the impact site. It was reported that no aircraft was damaged.

The Houthis immediately blamed Saudi Arabia for the attack, but the Yemeni government took responsibility for the attack saying the runway was targeted by them. The Iranian plane, unable to land on the Sana'a Airport diverted to the Houthi stronghold of Hodeidah and landed there.

== Aftermath ==
The Houthis immediately declared the ceasefire between them and Saudi Arabia over. The Houthis warned Saudi Arabia of consequences. Immediately after the strike, the PLC-affiliated Civil Aviation and Meteorology Authority(CAMA) ordered to shut down all domestic airports due to ongoing military activities. The Yemenis rallied near the Sana'a Airport showing solidarity against 'Saudi aggression'

=== Houthi military retaliation ===
Hours later, the Houthis declared that they had launched ballistic missile strikes on Saudi Arabia's Abha Airport and declared that the entire airspace over Saudi Arabia was a combat zone calling on for planes to avoid Saudi Arabian airspace while travelling. The Saudi Arabian defenses though proved to be capable with Saudi Arabia declaring that its Patriot defense systems successfully downed all the hostile objects in its airspace.

On the next day, 14 July, clashes between Houthis and the Yemeni government and the Saudis continued. The Houthis claimed to have downed a Saudi Arabian reconnaissance drone. The PLC placed its military force on high alert after 13 July.

Following the initial clashes, the conflict escalated heavily on 20 July when the Houthis declared a blockade on the Saudis and this led to further clashes between the Saudis and its allied forces and Houthi rebels. Following the announcement of blockade, multiple clashes and skirmishes broke out between PLC forces and its Saudi allies and the forces of the Supreme Political Council. The Houthis have since attacked several ships of Saudis and other countries in an effort to enforce blockade while also attacking several Saudi oil facilities in Saudi Arabia. The Axis of Resistance also has helped Houthis in their conduction of these activities.

=== Rallies in support of Houthis ===
After the attack, pro Houthi rallies erupted across Yemen. Many Yemenis gathered in front of the Sana'a airport and staged pro Houthi rallies against Saudi Arabian aggression. Popular rallies and armed tribal gatherings erupted across Yemen in support of the Houthis as the tribals condemned the Saudi airstrikes and supported the Iranian stance to break the blockade in Yemen.

Reuters reported that students gathered at Sanaa University to staged protests against Saudi Arabia on 17 July.

=== Saudi Arabian retaliation and impact ===
The Saudis have since used the Yemeni government and the Southern Giants Brigades as a proxy against the Houthi troops while conducting repeated airstrikes on Houthi targets like Hodeidah and Kamaran Island. The Guardian then later reported that the Saudis were moving troops from Eastern to Western Yemen and mobilizing along the border with Houthis with reports indicating Saudis were to launch an offensive into Central Yemen against the Houthi rebels.

The sudden escalation reportedly caught Saudi Arabia off guard. Saudi Arabia then entered into a leading charge of the Multinational Maritime Defense Alliance with the stated aim of restoring freedom of navigation in the Red Sea and later entering the trilateral Mecca Defence Alliance with Turkey and Pakistan.

== Reactions ==
=== Direct belligerents ===
Yemen (Presidential Leadership Council): The PLC President Rashad al-Alimi declared that there will be 'no compromise on sovereignty' regarding unauthorized plane flights. It is speculated that the Yemeni government aims to assert its authority that direct Iranian transit lines were completely unauthorized.

Houthis (Supreme Political Council): Houthi military spokesperson Yahya Saree condemned the strikes and blamed it on Saudi Arabia. It warned that the strikes wont go unpunished and declared the ceasefire and 'de-escalation period' to be 'over'. Saree also warned all international flights to avoid Saudi Arabian airspace. Houthi leader, Malik al-Houthi declared their strikes on Abha airport to be modest and threatened to continue retaliation if aggression persisted.

=== International reactions ===
Saudi Arabia: Saudi Arabia maintained its silence on the Sana'a strike while Saudi Arabian general Turki al-Maliki stated that the missiles launched by the Houthis towards the Abha Airport were successfully downed.

Iran: Iranian Foreign military spokesperson Esmail Baghaei released a statement calling the strike 'a flagrant violation of international law, the UN charter and Yemen's territorial integrity' and called this a breach of the agreed ceasefire.

UAE: The Emiratis voiced 'deep concern' over the regional escalation and urged an immediate halt to the hostilities.

UK: The United Kingdom's representative at the UN condemned the Houthi strikes on Saudi Arabia as 'reckless' and ones that threaten the stability of the region.

UN: The United Nations Security Council convened in emergency to discuss about the escalation in Yemen. The UN warned that the escalation threatened to return Yemen to full-scale civil war. UN assistant secretary general for political affairs, Khaled Khiari, warned that unilateral actions may result in further escalation of conflict and called on all parties to exercise restraint and 'take steps to de-escalate'.

== See also ==
- Mecca Defence Alliance
- Red Sea crisis
- Yemeni crisis
- 2026 Iran war
- October 2026 attacks on Saudi Arabia airports
- State funeral of Ali Khamenei
