= 2026 Shabwah missile attack =

Houthi attack in Yemen

- Part of 2026 Yemen offensives
- Type: Ballistic missile attack
- Location: Jardan district, Shabwah Governorate, Yemen
- Target: Martyr Ahmed al-Sulaiman Training Centre
- Date: 19 October 2026
- Executed by: Houthis
- Casualties: 75 killed 14 missing 200+ injured

On 19 October 2026, a training center within a military camp in Shabwah Governorate controlled by the internationally recognized government of Yemen was struck by Houthi missiles. The attacks killed at least 75 soldiers and injured over 200, most of them young recruits.

== Background ==
The attack occurred in the government-controlled Shabwah Governorate amidst the resumption of the Yemeni civil war after a four-year lull in fighting. The target of the attack was the al-Alam camp in Jardan district and, north of the provincial capital Ataq. Previously operated by a United Arab Emirates-aligned militia prior to their withdrawal from Yemen, the camp is strategically valuable to the government for operating supply lines to other areas, including Marib Governorate. Just prior to the attack, the Houthis blocked a road connecting Shabwah to the Houthi-controlled al-Bayda Governorate.

== Attack ==
On 19 October 2026, the Martyr Ahmed al-Sulaimani Training Centre, a facility within the al-Alam camp, was struck by three ballistic missiles. The targeted site was hosting a training drill for recruits joining Rapid Intervention, a newly-formed group involved in local defense. A government spokesperson said it was not involved in the current fighting and was providing "training and qualification programmes" for local forces in Shabwah.

The missile impacts occurred as the recruits were lining up to commence a training drill. Footage at the site published on social media and verified by The New York Times displayed bodies strewn across paved ground. The attacks killed 73 soldiers and wounded over 200 according to the government, the majority of them young recruits. It was the deadliest single incident since the resumption of the civil war. A Houthi spokesperson claimed they targeted a Saudi-led coalition military site ran by Saudi officers, and that it inflicted casualties on them. He did not provide any evidence in the statement.

== Aftermath ==
The victims were transported for treatment in Ataq, where hospitals urged locals to donate blood. They were visited by Shabwah governor Awad bin al-Wazir. Deputy governor Fahad al-Khalifi said those with critical injuries were transferred to Aden and Mukalla, Hadhramaut, to lighten the strain on local hospitals.

Presidential Leadership Council head Rashad al-Alimi said the Houthis resorted a terrorist attack as "their Iranian-backed sabotage plots falter", vowing a response. The same day he spoke to United Nations secretary-general António Guterres urging they designate the Houthis a terrorist organization. Information minister Moammar al-Eryani called the attack a war crime, contending that it was not a military target. He suggested the attack was an attempt to "fabricate a false media victory" to distract from setbacks on the ground.

A statement from the provincial government of Shabwah called the attack "an extremely critical military escalation and a blatant aggression on the security and stability" of the governorate. The provincial government urged further air defense and early warning system support from the federal government and Saudi Arabia, as did al-Wazir. An anonymous military official voiced concern to Agence France-Presse that the attack was the sign of an incoming Houthi offensive in Shabwah similar to their Mokha offensive.
