= 2016 Saudi Arabian snowstorm =

The 2016 Saudi Arabian snowstorm was an extreme weather event in late November 2016, in which parts of the Arabian Desert in Saudi Arabia experienced subzero temperatures, snowfall, and subsequent flooding.

== Meteorology ==
Saudi Arabia has an arid desert climate, and snowfall is a rare occurrence. Normal temperatures in November do not fall below 20 °C (68 °F). Snow has occasionally occurred in Saudi Arabia in previous winters. In 2013 a video of a man somersaulting in snow there circulated on social media. In January 2016, snow fell between Mecca and Medina for the first time in 85 years.

This November 2016 event was caused by a polar air intrusion, a cold front pushing south from Europe into the Arabian Peninsula, driving temperatures below their norm. As the cold front moved through the region, moist air followed from the south, creating heavy rain and flash foods across multiple regions of the country.

== Timeline ==
Snow was first reported in northern parts of Saudi Arabia on 23 November. By 25 November, temperatures as low as −4 °C (25 °F) were reported in Turaif, in Northern Borders Region, and there was snow cover in central and northeastern regions. Saudis enjoyed unusual outdoor activities such as building snowmen and sledding down snow covered sand dunes.

By November 27th, the cold front was followed by rain and lightning that caused extreme flash flooding.

== Casualties ==
The heavy rainfall was deadly. Civil Defence reported at least 7 casualties between November 28th and 30th. Saudi Civil Defense responded to almost 1,000 calls because of the flooding, rescuing hundreds of people from vehicles. Roads were blocked and vehicles were overturned by floods.

== Regional Scope ==
The storm was not limited to Saudi Arabia. As of 22 December 2016, snow had also fallen in Israel, Syria and other parts of the Middle East, showing the broad reach of this cold front.

== Infrastructure ==
The severity of the flooding was caused by Saudi Arabia's weak flood infrastructure. This country has experienced repeated flood events, and their quick urban expansion outpaced the creation of drainage systems in man cities, leaving communities exposed to risk during extreme weather events.
