= 2020 Riyadh drone and missile attack =

Conflict between Saudi Arabian forces and Yemeni Houthi rebels

- Part of the Houthi–Saudi Arabian conflict
- Type: Ballistic missile and drone strikes
- Location: Saudi Arabia
- Target: Saudi military facilities in Riyadh, Najran and Jizan
- Date: 23 June 2020; 10:00 a.m. (local time, UTC+3)
- Executed by: Houthi movement
- Casualties: None reported killed

On 23 June 2020, the Yemeni Houthi rebels carried out a cruise missile and drone attack targetting the King Khalid Airport and the Defense Ministry headquarters in Saudi Arabia's capital of Riyadh.

The Saudi-led coalition reported the interception of 8 Houthis UAVs and 3 ballistic missiles launched at Riyadh. According to Reuters: "Two loud explosions were heard in Riyadh and smoke billowed into the sky", but "there was no sign of damage to the side of the defense ministry building that is visible from the main road or to any surrounding buildings. The area was quiet on Tuesday evening, with normal traffic flows and no additional security measures.

According to Saudi-led coalition spokesman Col. Turki al-Malki, the Houthi attack was "a deliberate hostile action designed to target civilians".

== Background ==
In March 2018, Houthi forces targeted Riyadh with missile attacks. Reuters reported that Saudi forces said they shot down three missiles over Riyadh shortly before midnight. Debris fell on a home in the capital, killing an Egyptian man and wounding two others.

In June 2019, the Houthis launched cruise missiles at Abha International Airport and killed a Syrian civilian and wounded 47 others.

In September 2019, Iranian forces launched an attack on Saudi Arabia's Abqaiq–Khurais energy facility.

During the ongoing civil war in Yemen and the Saudi intervention in Yemen, Houthi forces were achieving territorial gains in the Al Jawf Governorate and in Marib. The attack is considered by analysts as a big escalation in the war and a reason for Saudi Arabia to reconsider "its military prowess".

== Attacks ==
According to the Houthis the attack was carried out targeting 5 locations in Saudi Arabia and Yemen:

- King Khalid Airport and Defense Ministry headquarters Riyadh, Saudi Arabia.
- Military assets of the Saudi led coalition in Najran, Saudi Arabia.
- Abha Airport in Khamis Mushait, Saudi Arabia.
- Military assets of the Saudi led coalition in Jizan, Saudi Arabia.
- Tadawin and al-Ruwaik bases in Marib, Yemen.

No casualties were reported.

== Reactions ==
- United States- The embassy of the United States in Saudi Arabia confirmed a report of "missile and drone attacks" in Riyadh, and make a call to take precautions. The embassy urged people to take defensive actions. Quoting "If you are outdoors, immediately seek cover". This statement corroborated the possibility of the attack amid fears of more waves of attacks on Saudi Arabia.
