= Homeland Shield Forces =

Yemeni military force

- قوات درع الوطن
- Active: 2023 — present
- Country: Yemen
- Allegiance: (Yemen) President of the Presidential Leadership Council
- Branch: Yemeni Land Forces
- Size: 45,000 soldiers
- Garrison/HQ: Hadhramaut Governorate
- Nickname: National Shield Forces
- Engagements: Yemeni civil war (2014–present); Southern Transitional Council conflict; 2025–2026 southern Yemen campaign; 2026 Yemen offensives

Commanders
- Current commander: Salem Ahmed Said Al-Khanbashi

The Homeland Shield Forces (Arabic: قوات درع الوطن) (Note: Also called "National Shield Forces") are a Yemeni military force that operates as a "reserve force for the Supreme Commander of the Armed Forces", established in 2023 by the President of the Presidential Leadership Council.

== Background ==
The forces were announced as "Happy Yemen Forces" in 2022, the group later changed their name to "New Giants Forces" but the change provoked mixed reactions.

In September 2022, the group name was officially changed to "Homeland Shield Forces".

== History ==
=== Foundation ===
In 2023, Presidential Article 18 established the group as a "Reserve force for the Supreme Commander of the Armed Forces", the President Rashad al-Alimi will decide the size, operations, and area of the group.

=== Operations ===
On 2 January, 2026, during the 2025–2026 southern Yemen campaign, Rashad al-Alimi ordered Salem Ahmed Said Al-Khanbashi, the governor of Hadhramaut, to assume command of the Homeland Shield Forces in the governorate and begin a military operation to take control of all military bases and camps under STC control. On 4 January, Yemeni forces announced that the Homeland Shield Forces had recaptured all nine districts of Hadhramaut Governorate. On 6 January, the Homeland Shield Forces entered the Abyan Governorate, following the withdrawal of the Southern Transitional Council. On 8 January, the Homeland Shield Forces entered Aden from the Abyan Governorate.

On September 13, during the 2026 Yemen offensives, the group claimed that its 6th Brigade had downed five drones during clashes in the al-Aghbara area. On September 21, the group claimed to have shot down 2 Houthi drones during the clashes. On September 25, the Homeland Shield Forces stated that, with the support of the Giants Brigades and members of local tribes, they captured the summit of Mount Dar al-Kafir in Lahej Governorate following an infiltration and an assault.

== Strength ==
The Homeland Shield Forces have approximately 50,000 soldiers.

== Organization, structure, and leadership ==
The Homeland Shield Forces is the reserve of the Yemeni Armed Forces and the General Command of the Homeland Shield Forces is made of two members, the Chief of the Homeland Shield Forces, and the Chief of War Staff of the Homeland Shield Forces, the Homeland Shield Forces are made of the:

- 1st Homeland Shield Division based in southern Yemen
  - 6th Brigade
- 2nd Homeland Shield Division based in Hadramaut
- 3rd Homeland Shield Division
