= Bani Omar (subdistrict) =

Bani Omar بني عمر
- Sub-district
- Location in Yemen
- Coordinates: 14°23′59″N 44°13′24″E
- Country: Yemen
- Governorate: Ibb Governorate
- District: Yarim District

Population (2004)
  - Total: 10,914
- Time zone: UTC+3

Bani Omar (Arabic: بني عمر) is a sub-district located in Yarim District, Ibb Governorate, Yemen. Bani Omar had a population of 10914 as of 2004.
