= Hays district =

Coordinates: 13°55′N 43°28′E

Hays District
- District
- Interactive map of Hays District
- Country: Yemen
- Governorate: Al Hudaydah

Population (2003)
  - Total: 45,436
- Time zone: UTC+3 (Yemen Standard Time)

Hays District (Arabic: مديرية حيس) is a district of the Al Hudaydah Governorate, Yemen. As of 2003, the district had a population of 45,436 inhabitants.
