= Subeihi =

Tribe in Yemen

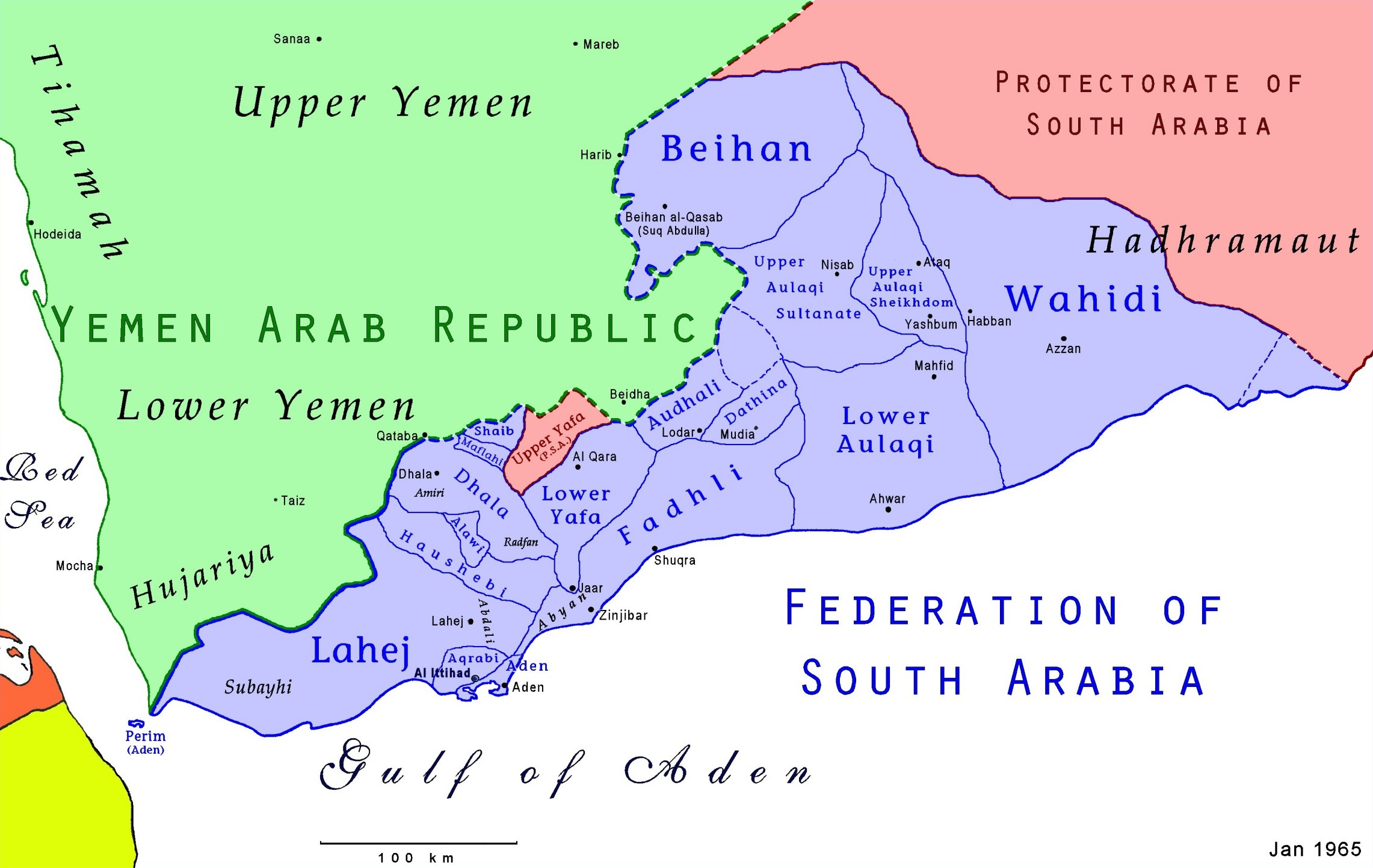
Map of the Federation of South Arabia showing Subeihi within Lahej

Subeihi or Subayhi (Arabic: الصبيحي aṣ-Ṣubayḥī), or the Subeihi Sultanate (Arabic: سلطنة الصبيحي Salṭanat aṣ-Ṣubayḥī or Arabic: سلطنة الصبيحة Salṭanat aṣ-Ṣubayḥah), was the westernmost state in the western Aden Protectorate. It was one of the original "Nine Cantons" that signed protection agreements with Great Britain in the late 19th century.

The designation of "state" when referring to the Subeihi is contentious, as they were divided into a number of petty clans who owed no allegiance to a single paramount Chief, had little to no political unity, and entered treaty relations with the British separately.

== History ==
In 1839, after the capture of Aden, several engagements were arranged between the British and with Chiefs of this tribe; but until 1871 the only Chiefs enjoying stipends from the British Government were the heads of the Dubeini and Rijai clans. In that year the Mansuri clan attacked and plundered a caravan coming into Aden.

A detachment of the Aden troop, which had been raised in 1865 for police purposes, was despatched against them, and an action ensued in which one of the Chiefs and most of his party were killed. Eventually, in 1871, the Subeihi Chiefs came into Aden and tendered their submission : they also entered into Engagements to preserve the peace of the roads, to restore plundered property, and to abolish transit duties and taxes on the roads passing through their territories, in return for monthly stipends. An additional Engagement was also signed in 1871 by the Mansuri Chief, by which he admitted his responsibility for the good behaviour of the Kuraisi.

A separate Engagement was made in 1871 with the Atifi sub-division of the tribe, by which they agreed to afford protection to shipwrecked seamen of any nation, and to protect and send to Aden deserters from the garrison and shipping.

An expedition despatched in 1878 by sea and land was successful in putting a stop, tor the time, to the depredations committed by the Barhimi, a sub-tribe of the Subeihi, but on the recrudescence of disorder the whole tribe was put under the control of the Abdali. In 1886, however, the Subeihi agreement became inoperative, the various Subeihi tribes resumed their old position of independent relations with the Aden Residency, and their stipends were restored to them.

In 1889 Protectorate Treaties were made with the Atifi and Barhimi. These were ratified on 26 February 1890.

In April 1899, owing to continual robberies by the Subeihi, the Abdali Sultan was given permission to occupy It as al Arab, Turan and Am Rija. In November the Atifi attacked an Abdali post, but when the Abdali collected a large force the Atifi submitted.

In 1900 Muhammad Salih Tatar, the late Native Assistant Resident, took refuge among the Mansuri and Makhdumi and incited them to plunder.

In 1902 the Abdali collected a large force and several skirmishes took place in Subeihi country. The Subeihi continued to plunder during 1904.

In March 1904 Captain Warneford was murdered at Am Rija on his way to join the Boundary Commission as political officer. By May the boundary was demarcated. No opposition was experienced from any tribe, except the Khalifi, Atawi and Jazeri.

A postal sowar carrying Government mails was shot by a raiding party of Atifi near Shaikh Othman in January 1906. The greater part of the mails was recovered, but the tribesmen, failing to surrender the offenders as they were called upon to do, were prohibited from entering Aden and payment of their stipend was suspended.

Salih Ba Haidara the Rijai, murderer of Captain Warneford, was shot by a dependant of the Mansuri Shaikh in March 1906.

In July 1906, a dhow flying Italian colours was wrecked and pillaged off the Barhimi coast. The Barhimi Shaikh was ordered to pay compensation; but, he having failed to do so, the amount, Rs. 2,450, was paid by Government and subsequently deducted from his stipend.

Some of the Subeihi clans, notably the Dubini and Eijai, took part in the looting of Shaikh Ollunan after the capture of Lahej by the Turks in 1915.

In February 1919, an Agreement was concluded with the Ahdali Sultan placing the Sulieihi again under his general control.

In September 1927 a large force of North Yemeni troops invaded Subeihi territory in the neighbourhood of Turan, but retired as the result of warnings of air action.

In December 1928, when a curtailment of doles and entertainment to the chiefs was effected, the tribesmen became restive and resorted to their old tactics of murder and pillage. They were ordered to cease and to make restitution for their offences and, on their refusing to do so, air action was taken against the more guilty parties. The tribesmen eventually made their submission.

In 1931, gross revenue of the tribe was estimated at Its. 8,000 a year, and the population at 20,000.

In 1946, it had a population of 20,000.

In 1948, it came under the sway of the Sultanate of Lahej and is now part of the Republic of Yemen.
