= Al Maqatirah district =

Al Maqatirah District
- District
- Location in Yemen
- Coordinates: 13°10′N 44°20′E
- Country: Yemen
- Governorate: Lahij

Population (2003)
  - Total: 54,613
- Time zone: UTC+3 (Yemen Standard Time)

Al Maqatirah District is a district of the Lahij Governorate, Yemen. In 2003, the district had a population of 54,613 inhabitants. The area was involved in combat engagements between Houthi and government forces in 2026.
