= Jardan district =

Coordinates: 15.1897°N 46.7336°E

Jardan District
- District
- Interactive map of Jardan District
- Country: Yemen
- Governorate: Shabwah

Population (2003)
  - Total: 16,270
- Time zone: UTC+3 (Yemen Standard Time)

Jardan District (Arabic: مديرية جردان) is a district of the Shabwah Governorate in Yemen. As of 2003, the district had a population of 16,270 people.
