= Al-Wazi'iyah district =

Coordinates: 13.1844°N 43.7297°E

Al Wazi'iyah District
- District
- Interactive map of Al Wazi'iyah District
- Country: Yemen
- Governorate: Taiz

Population (2003)
  - Total: 75,288
- Time zone: UTC+3 (Yemen Standard Time)

Al Wazi'iyah District (Arabic: مديرية الوازعية) is a district of the Taiz Governorate, Yemen. As of 2003, the district had a population of 75,288 inhabitants.
