= Fall of Mokha =

2026 Battle in the Yemeni Civil War

- Part of 2026 Yemen offensives during the Yemeni civil war
Date	3–10 September 2026
Location	Mokha, Taiz Governorate, Yemen
Result	SPC victory

Belligerents
(Yemen) Supreme Political Council: Houthis	(Yemen) Presidential Leadership Council: Yemeni National Resistance

Commanders and leaders
(Yemen) Mahdi al-Mashat (Yemen) Muhammad al-Atifi (Yemen) Yusuf al-Madani	(Yemen) Rashad al-Alimi (Yemen) Tareq Saleh (Yemen) Sultan al-Arada

Units involved
Yemeni Armed Forces (SPC): - (Yemen) Yemeni Land Forces (SPC) - Unmanned Aviation Forces (SPC)	Yemeni Armed Forces (PLC): - (Yemen) Yemeni Land Forces (PLC); 4th Military Region; Yemeni National Resistance; 5th Brigade

Casualties and losses
(Yemen) Per National Resistance Forces: 1,000+ killed - thousands injured - (Along the entire west coast between 9 August–10 September) - Per PLC: - dozens of vehicles destroyed - 1 M113 APC destroyed - 5 UAVs shot down	(Yemen) Per National Resistance Forces: 500+ killed - 1,500 injured - (Along the entire west coast between 9 August–10 September) - Per Al Jazeera: - Millions of dollars in equipment captured

In September 2026, the Houthi-led Supreme Political Council launched a surprise offensive to capture the Red Sea coast of western Yemen and territory around Taiz to cement its influence over the Strait of Bab al-Mandab. The offensive that followed heavily concentrated on the port city of Mokha, and the city served as an epicentre of the Houthi offensive.

The Houthis (referred to as Ansar Allah) eventually captured the city of Mokha on 10 September. The city of Mokha was previously under the control of the Yemeni National Resistance led by Tareq Saleh.

The fall of Mokha was attributed to the Houthis' use of swarm tactics, and the "tactical withdrawal" of the National Resistance that caused the lines in Mokha to collapse.

On 5 October 2026, Yemeni media claimed that the PLC recaptured Mokha. However, this was denied by the Houthis.

== Strategic importance ==
Mokha is a port city on the Red Sea along the Strait of Bab al-Mandab and has served as the headquarters of the National Resistance and a primary supply hub of the PLC.

== Timeline ==
The Houthis began a bombing campaign against Mokha on 9 August 2026. Missiles and drones struck military sites, as well as "civilian infrastructure, employee residences and their families, power generation stations, and civilian sites within the city" according to a Yemeni military spokesman. They also severely damaged the port of Mokha.

The attacks continued from thereon, with at least 60 projectiles having struck the city by 12 August. An attack on a commercial ship nearing the port on 11 August left six people dead. Six ballistic missiles struck the port late on 14 August, while shelling was reported against residential areas in Mokha. Port officials reported four missiles hitting a quay, possibly to disrupt excavation work for the navigation channel. Attacks on residential neighbourhoods were reported on 15 August followed by further attacks on the outskirts of Mokha and a road leading to it overnight on 16 August. By 20 August, around 90 projectiles were believed to have been launched towards Mokha, of which more than 35 struck the port, killing 16 people and wounding 22.

On 3 September, the SPC forces launched a broad ground assault in western Taiz and along the Red Sea coast. Government sources stated that the aim was to sever the Taiz-Mokha road and isolate Mokha. On 4 September, sources reported more than 120 combatants killed over the first two days.

Between 5 and 6 September, PLC forces regained ground, capturing several hilltops around southern and western Taiz, including terrain near Jabal Habashi. On 8 September, the Institute for the Study of War assessed that the PLC advances were halted in part due to the difficult terrain vulnerable to a Houthi attack.

The offensive achieved a breakthrough on late 9 September as the Houthis pushed into al-Wazi'iyah district and from there seized Jabal al-Nar, a mountain east of Mokha, and the Khalid ibn al-Walid camp, the second-largest military base in Yemen. At night time, Houthi forces from southern Hodeidah and western Taiz began to close in on Mokha. Intense clashes took place with pro-government forces in the city overnight.

As they began entering Mokha on 10 September, the Houthis found that pro-government units were depleted and filled with ghost soldiers. Facing an onslaught of Houthi ground forces and air attacks by mid-morning, pro-government forces requested air support from Saudi Arabia but did not receive any. Local fisherman Ali Al-Ahdal said government forces had withdrawn by 5:00 a.m., allowing for Houthi fighters to stream in and cut off exits to the city.

According to those interview by The Media Line, most residents in Mokha stayed indoors during the capture as the Houthis arrested activists, journalists, doctors, and humanitarian workers among other people. Residents described roads leading to Mokha from the west being closed along with governments buildings and shops. The New York Times verified a video depicting trucks of Houthi gunmen driving through a main road in the city. A Houthi-aligned foreign ministry statement announced the end of fighting in the region.

On 5 October, Yeman national army claimed they recaptured Mokha from Houthis.

== Aftermath ==
The Houthi advance continued south after Mokha. On 11 September, Reuters reported that the Houthi forces had taken Dhubab, the PLC's last Red Sea coastal town/port, and reached Perim Island in the Bab al-Mandeb strait. Subsequently, the Houthis took Greater and Lesser Hanish, tightening their grip on shipping in the Red Sea. Meanwhile, the PLC claimed to have carried out airstrikes against Houthi personnel, vehicles and weapons near Mokha and on the Mocha-Dhubab road, about 11 km from the city.

On 10 September, Al Jazeera reported more than 20,000 people displaced across Taiz and Hodeidah governorates over the preceding two weeks, including people fleeing south from Mokha. By 12 September, The Guardian reported that nearly 50,000 civilians had fled the western Yemeni fighting.

== Analysis ==
The Houthi capture of Mocha led to the fall of the rest of the Yemeni Western coast by the next day and led to Houthis cementing their position along the Bab el Mandeb Strait.

The AI-development agency Anthropic later claimed that the Houthis had used the AI-chatbot Claude (AI) to manufacture rockets, and missile systems and after getting to know it the company banned all the associated accounts in this operation of the Houthis. Moreover, during the Fall of Mokha, media outlets like NDTV and India Today reported that the Houthis used Claude to generate a voice of Tareq Saleh to issue a fake order which called upon the National Resistance to retreat as the 'soldiers were suffering heavy casualties'.

== See also ==
- September 2026 Houthi strikes on Saudi Arabia
- 2026 East–West Crude Oil Pipeline attack
