= Saudi Civil Defense =

National civil defence agency of Saudi Arabia

- الدفاع المدني السعودي
- Emblem of the Saudi Civil Defense

Agency overview
- Formed: 1 July 1927; 99 years ago
- Headquarters: Riyadh, Saudi Arabia
- Agency executives: Abdulaziz bin Saud, Minister of Interior; Lt. Gen. Dr. Hamoud bin Suleiman Al-Faraj, Director General
- Parent agency: Ministry of Interior
- Website: 998.gov.sa

The Saudi Civil Defense (Arabic: الدفاع المدني السعودي), officially the General Directorate of Civil Defense (Arabic: المديرية العامة للدفاع المدني), is the national civil defence agency of Saudi Arabia, operating under the country's Ministry of Interior. Headquartered in Riyadh, the agency provides nationwide emergency management, firefighting, and rescue services.

== See also ==
- Ministries of Saudi Arabia
- Council of Ministers of Saudi Arabia
