= Abha International Airport =

Airport in Saudi Arabia

Abha International Airport مطار أبها الدولي
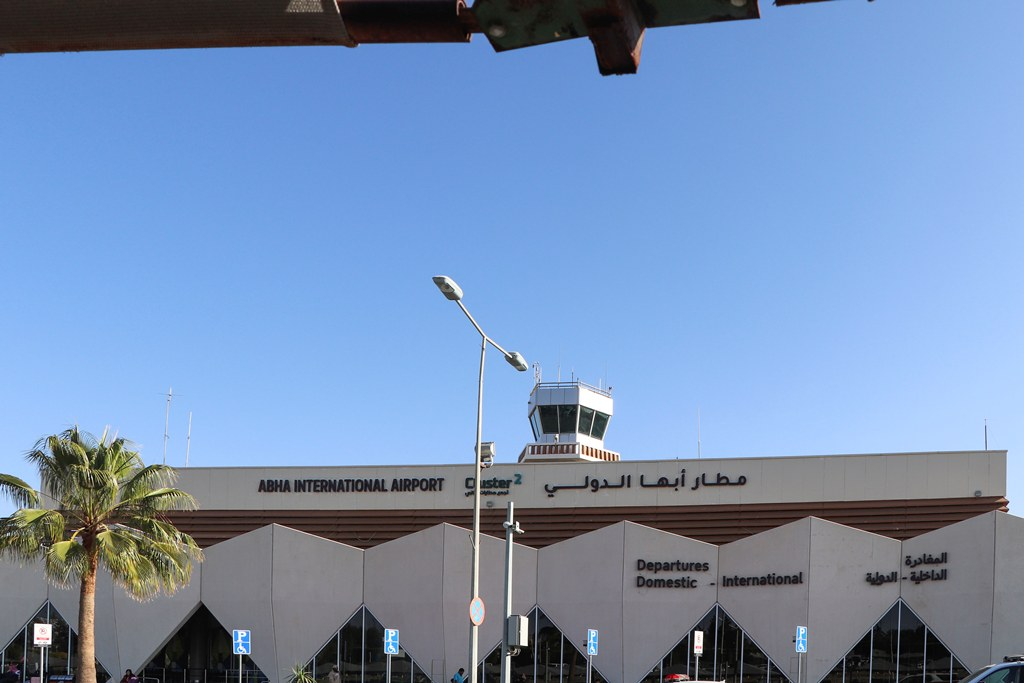
- IATA: AHB; ICAO: OEAB

Summary
- Airport type: Public
- Owner: State
- Operator: Government
- Serves: Abha / Khamis Mushait
- Location: Asir Province, Saudi Arabia
- Operating base for: Flynas
- Elevation AMSL: 6,858 ft (2,090 m)
- Coordinates: 18°14′25″N 042°39′24″E
- Website: https://abha-airport.com

Map
- Location of airport in Saudi Arabia

Runways
Direction	Length		Surface
Direction	m	ft	Surface
13/31	3,350	10,991	Asphalt

Abha International Airport (Arabic: مطار أبها الدولي, IATA: AHB, ICAO: OEAB) is an airport in Abha, the capital of Asir Province in Saudi Arabia.

The site was a new construction area between Khamis Mushait and Abha, and serves both cities.

== History ==
Construction of the airport started in mid-1975 by Laing Wimpey Alireza. Earlier, domestic flights had been handled at the military airport near Khamis Mushait. The airport became operational in 1977. The construction was carried out by Bin Trif Airport ltd.

On 7 October 2026, Abha International Airport, along with King Khalid International Airport, were targeted by a drone strike by the Houthis. At Abha International Airport, a Moroccan and an Algerian were killed, while another 28 people were injured.

== Facilities ==
The airport is located at an elevation of 6,858 feet (2,090 m) above mean sea level. It has one runway designated 13/31 with an asphalt surface measuring 3,350 by 45 metres (10,991 ft × 148 ft).

== Airlines and destinations ==
The following airlines operate regular scheduled and charter flights:

Airlines	Destinations
Air Arabia	Cairo, Sharjah
Air Cairo	Assiut, Cairo, Sohag
Egyptair	Cairo
Flyadeal	Dammam, Jeddah, Riyadh; Seasonal: Cairo
Flydubai	Dubai–International
Flynas	Addis Ababa, Al Baha, Bisha, Cairo, Dammam, Dubai–Al Maktoum, Dubai–International, Gassim, Giza, Istanbul, Jeddah, Jizan, Kuwait City, Medina, Riyadh, Sharurah, Trabzon, Wadi al-Dawasir
Jazeera Airways	Kuwait City
Nesma Airlines	Cairo
Nile Air	Cairo
Qatar Airways	Doha
SalamAir	Muscat
Saudia	Cairo, Jeddah, Medina, Riyadh, Tabuk, Ta’if

== Houthi attacks ==
The airport has been frequently targeted in missile or drone attacks by Houthi forces during the Yemeni civil war.

It was initially attacked by the Yemeni Houthi movement on 12 June 2019, injuring 26 people.

On 23 June 2019, the Houthis launched another attack on the airport, leaving a Syrian national dead and 21 injured.

The airport was attacked again by missiles on 2 July 2019, leaving nine injured.

Another attack against the airport by Houthi forces occurred on 31 August 2020, when a bomb-laden drone was detected flying to it and intercepted, along with a remotely controlled boat off the Red Sea, which was also filled with explosives and ready for an attack.

On 10 February 2021, Houthis used four drones to carry out a drone strike on the airport, damaging a civilian aircraft (a Flyadeal Airbus A320) and starting a fire. A Houthi spokesman said the attack was in response to coalition airstrikes and other actions in Yemen.

On 31 August 2021, the airport was again attacked by Houthi drones, leaving 8 wounded.

On 13 July 2026, the airport was attacked once again by Houthi drones, no casualties reported.

== See also ==
- List of airports in Saudi Arabia
- Prince Naif bin Abdulaziz International Airport
- Amaala International Airport
- General Authority of Civil Aviation
