= Yahya Saree =

Military spokesman of the Houthi Movement (born 1970)

Brigadier General Yahya Saree
- يحيى سريع
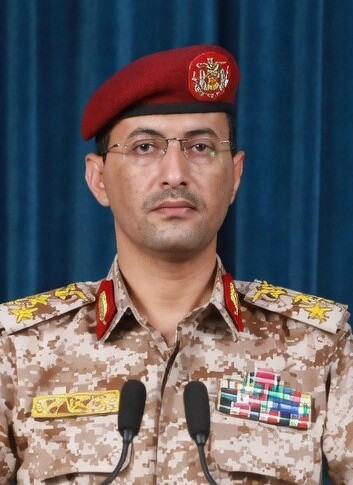
- Saree in May 2026

Director of Moral Guidance Department of the Yemeni Armed Forces
- Incumbent
- Assumed office 2018

Personal details
- Born: 1970 (age 55–56) Saada Governorate, North Yemen
- Occupation: Spokesperson for the Yemeni Armed Forces
- Website: Official website

Military service
- Allegiance: Yemeni Armed Forces (SPC); Houthi movement
- Rank: Brigadier general
- Battles/wars: Yemeni Civil War (2014–present); Saudi Arabian-led intervention in Yemen; Gaza war; Red Sea crisis; 2024 missile strikes in Yemen; April 2024 Iranian strikes on Israel

Yahya Qasim Saree (Note: Arabic: يحيى قاسم سريع) (born 1970) is a Yemeni military officer who serves as the spokesperson for the Supreme Political Council-led Yemeni Armed Forces, a renegade faction of Yemen's armed forces aligned with the Houthis. He frequently appears in military statements made by the Yemeni Armed Forces, most notably on the attacks targeting Israel-linked vessels passing through the Red Sea and Bab al-Mandab Strait.

His statements are broadcast primarily via Al-Masirah TV, his Telegram channel, and his Twitter accounts.

== Early life ==
Yahya Saree was born in 1970 in Saada Governorate in northern Yemen, which is adjacent to the border with Saudi Arabia. He earned a bachelor's and master's degree in political science and has also taken combat, security, administrative and specialised courses in military science.

== Career ==
Following the outbreak of the Yemen war in 2015, Saree enlisted in the Yemeni Armed Forces. By 2017, he had been promoted to the rank of Colonel and appointed head of the Psychological Warfare Division within the Moral Guidance Department.

In mid-2018, he was named Director of the Moral Guidance Department and subsequently promoted to the rank of Brigadier General. On 17 October 2018, he was appointed as the official spokesman for the Yemeni Armed Forces, succeeding Brigadier General Sharaf Luqman.

On 3 May 2024, Saree announced in a televised speech that "we will target any ships heading to Israeli ports in the Mediterranean Sea in any area we are able to reach."

== Media presence ==
His statements are broadcast primarily via Al-Masirah TV, his Telegram channel, and his Twitter accounts. Saree's main Arabic-language Twitter account, originally active since November 2018, was suspended by Twitter in April 2022. At the time, it had over 340,000 followers and served as a key platform for updates on military operations against Saudi Arabia and the United Arab Emirates. Following the suspension, Saree accused Twitter of aligning with the "forces of aggression" and attempting to "silence mouths that expose them and reveal their crimes". He later announced the creation of a new Arabic-language account.

In 2024, Twitter removed the blue "Verified" badges from several Houthi-affiliated accounts, including Saree's Arabic and English profiles, as well as those of Hussein Al-Ezzi, the Houthi government's deputy foreign affairs minister, and the Al-Masirah media network. The removal came shortly after the U.S. redesignated the Houthis as a terrorist organization, which also led to the suspension of several related accounts. Houthi officials denounced the move, calling it a "violation of all human rights conventions". After being reinstated and amassing approximately 121,500 followers, Saree's account was suspended again in 2026.

A multi-volume book series titled The Spokesman has been published by the Department of Moral Guidance of the Yemeni Armed Forces, compiling Saree's official statements and press conferences. The first volume covered the period from October 17, 2018, to October 17, 2019. A second volume was issued on November 28, 2022, documenting activities from October 18, 2019, to May 30, 2022. The third volume was published on April 15, 2025, focusing on Saree's announcements during the "Promised Victory and Holy Jihad" campaign in support of Gaza.

== See also ==
- Abdul-Malik al-Houthi
