= Turki al-Maliki =

Saudi Arabian major general (born 1974)

Major General Turki al-Maliki
- Turki al-Maliki in 2024
- Born: Turki bin Saleh al-Maliki; 1974 (age 51–52); Taif, Saudi Arabia
- Military career
- Allegiance: Saudi Arabia
- Branch: Royal Saudi Air Force
- Rank: Major General
- Conflict: Yemeni civil war; Saudi-led intervention

Major General Turki bin Saleh al-Maliki (Arabic: تركي بن صالح المالكي; born 1974) is a Royal Saudi Air Force officer who is a member of the RSAF's Department of Plans and Operations. He is the spokesperson for the Saudi-led intervention in the Yemeni civil war since 2017, succeeding Major-general Ahmad Asiri, who was the head of the mission since the start of the military intervention led by the Saudi Arabian Armed Forces, Operation Decisive Storm, and then Operation Restoring Hope in Yemen.

== Life and career ==
Turki al-Maliki was born in Taif in 1974, and received his bachelor's degree in air sciences from King Faisal Air Academy with distinction in 1997. He earned a master’s degree in military studies in 2015. Al-Malki undertook his studies in aviation at the American Naval Air Station in Pensacola, Florida, where he completed training in T-34, T-39 and T-2 aircraft. He graduated in 2000 and worked at King Abdul Aziz Air Base on the F-15S aircraft in Dhahran, and at King Khalid Air Base in Khamis Mushait.

After that, he moved to work under the leadership of the Royal Saudi Air Force in the Plans and Operations Department and held several positions. During his military service, he took many courses, including: the foundation and advanced course on F-15S and courses in electronic warfare, airspace management, air operations planning, air defense operations, the squadron commanders course, the prevention course against weapons of mass destruction, in addition to courses in international humanitarian law on armed conflict.

On July 27, 2017, Colonel Turki al-Maliki was appointed as the new spokesman for the Arab Coalition, succeeding Major General Ahmed Asiri, who was the head of the mission since the beginning of the military operation led by the Saudi Arabian Armed Forces in Yemen, the start of Operation Decisive Storm, and then Operation Restore Hope in Yemen.

== Responses to war-crimes ==
A UN report in August 2018, said that coalition air strikes have caused the most direct civilian casualties. Turki responded by accusing the UN of being "biased" and of being under Houthi pressure. He said this in spite of Ban Ki-moon having admitted to having removed Saudi Arabia from its 2015 list of “parties that kill or maim children” and “parties that engage in attacks on schools and/or hospitals” after 'undue' financial pressure from the Saudi government in June 2016.

An August 2017 early morning attack in the Faj Attan area of Sanaa hit a vacant building but caused an adjacent apartment block to collapse, killing at least 12 people, six of them children; Turki al-Maliki defended the strike as having "a legitimate military target", which he said was a Houthi command and control centre. A senior ICRC official visited the site of the strike on Friday and said, "From what we saw on the ground, there was no apparent military target."

After a series of Saudi-led Airstrikes over a prison complex that killed over 100 in Dhamar, in September, 2019, Turki al-Maliki made statement in the Saudi-owned Al Arabiya TV by plainly denying the target was a prison. Local residents said family members arrested for being critical of the Houthis were imprisoned in the detention center.
