= Al-Hujariah =

Locality in Taiz Governorate, Yemen

Coordinates: 13°22′23″N 43°56′29″E

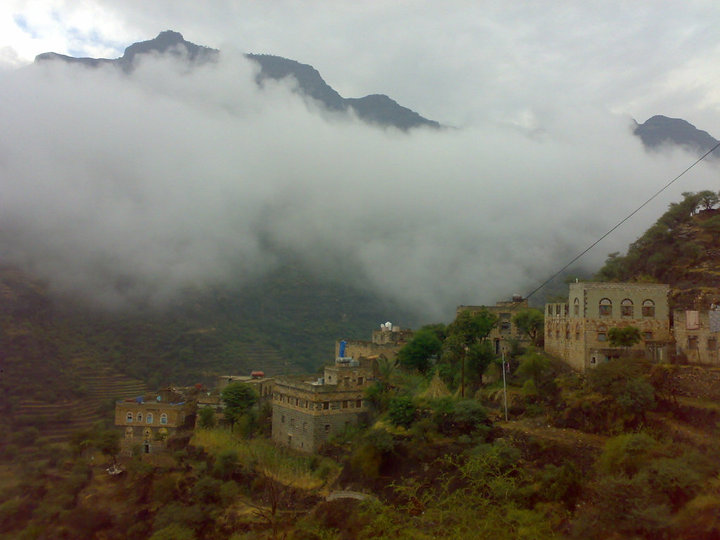
Al-Hujariah region

Al-Hujariah (Arabic: الحجرية), also known as Mikhlaf al-Maʿafir (Arabic: مخلاف المعافر) (al-Maʿafir region) and Mapharitis (Μαφαρῖτις), is a mountainous region in southwestern Yemen. It has an estimated population of one million. Most of the region is located inside Taiz Governorate and some of it is located in Lahj Governorate.

The region includes al-Qabitah District, al-Ma'afer District, Jabal Habashi District, al Maqatirah District, ash-Shamaytan District, as-Silw District, al-Wazi'iyah District and al-Mawasit District.

== History ==
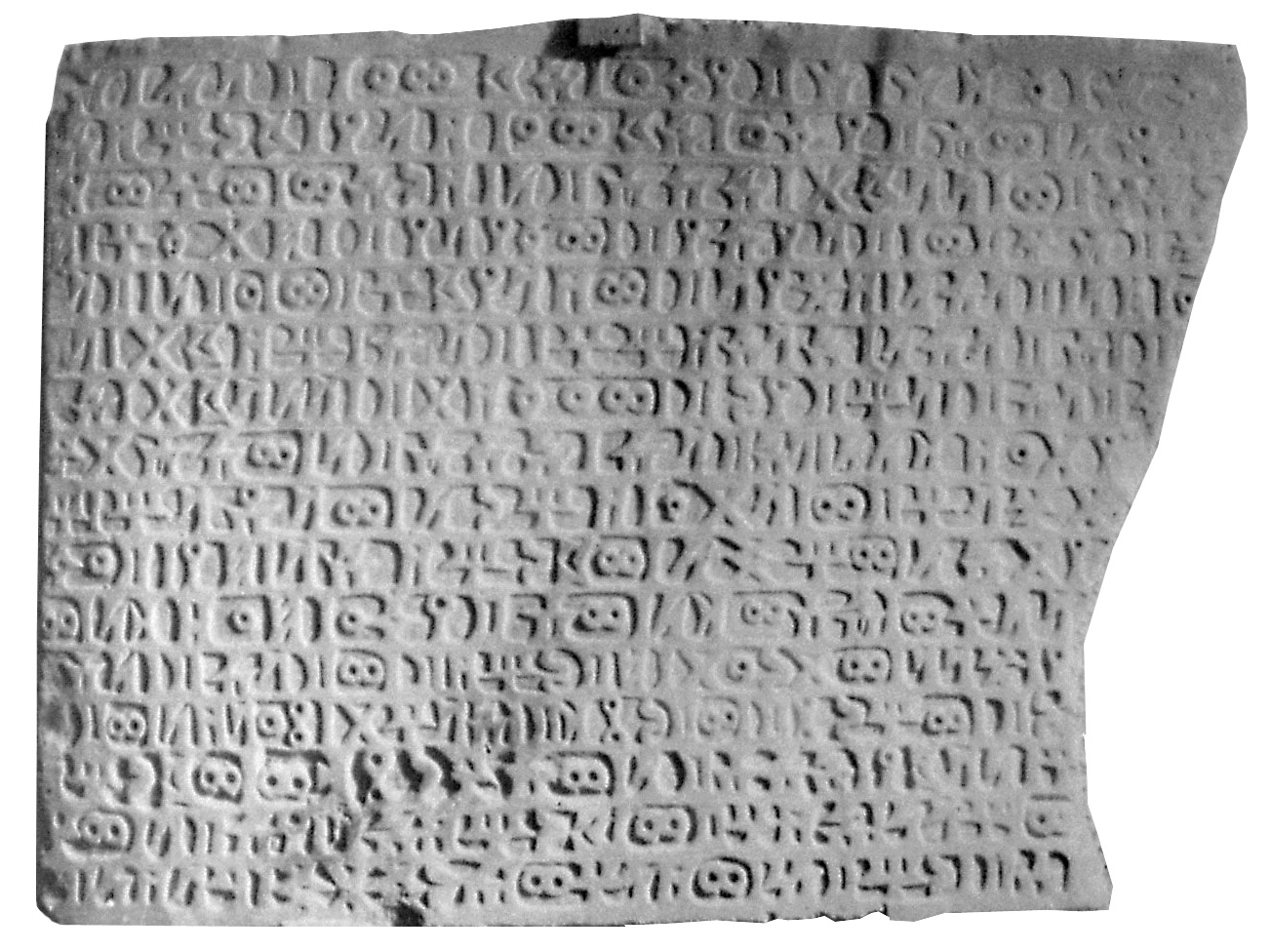
A Yemeni inscription mentioning the tribe of Maʿafir (ḏ Mʿfrn or ḏ Mʿfrm)

Al-Maʿafir is a Himyarite tribe. Al-Maʿafir region is mentioned in Greek sources as Mapharitis. According to Greek sources, the capital of Al-Maʿafir was Sawe (Σαυή), or modern-day Sawwa (Arabic: السواء).

=== Ancient history ===
==== 7th century BCE Sabaean campaign ====
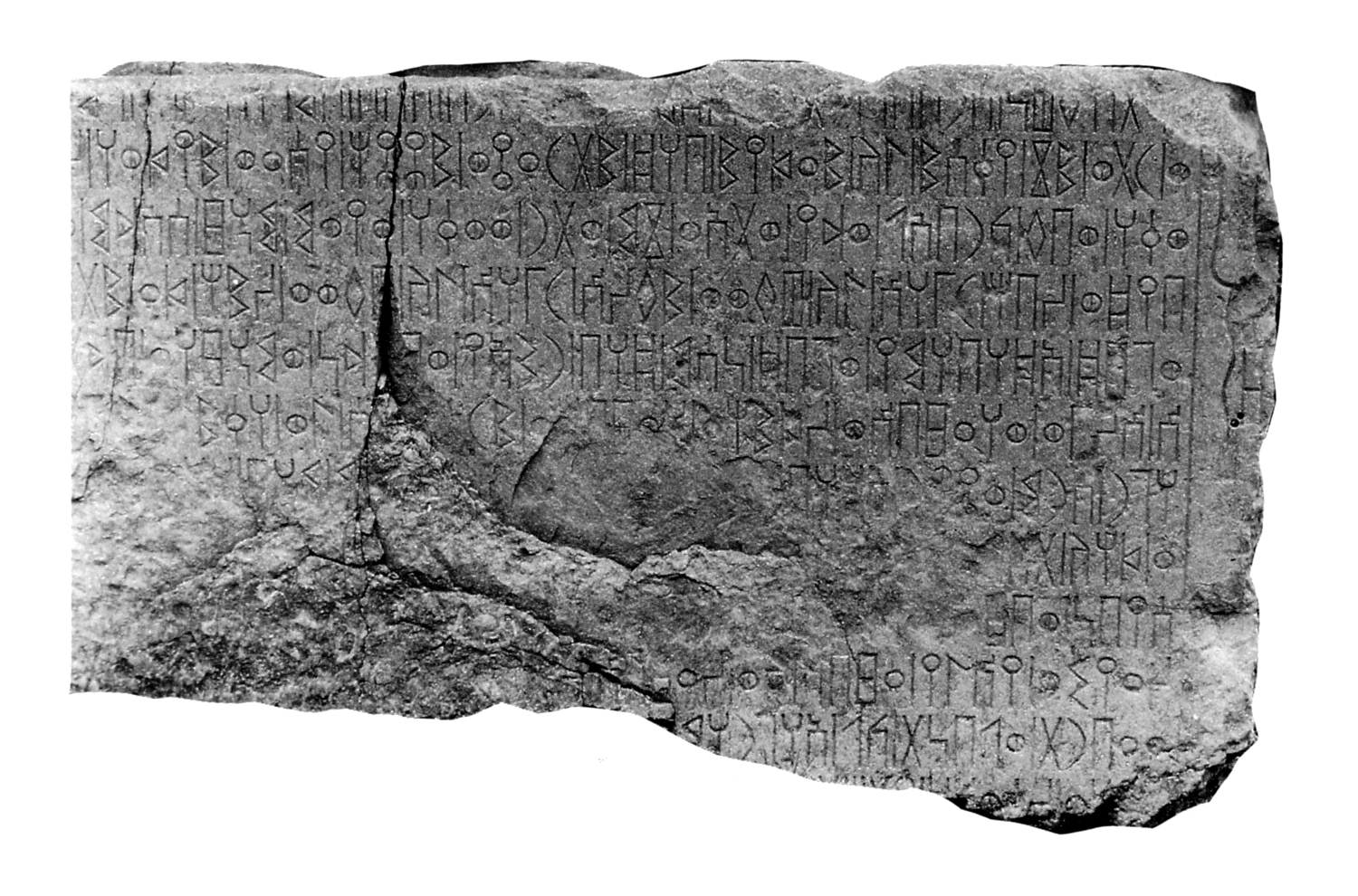
Part of the so-called 'Naqsh an-Nasr' or 'Inscription of Victory' (RES 3945)

Al-Maʿafir region appears in many ancient South Arabian inscriptions. The oldest known inscription that mentions al-Maʿafir dates back to the seventh century BCE. The inscription is part of an inscription called Naqsh an-Nasr or Inscription of Victory (RES 3945). The inscription describes Karib'il Watar's attack on the cities of al-Maʿafir during his campaign against Awsan. Karib'il Watar destroyed and burned the cities of al-Maʿafir, killing 3,000 and taking 8,000 prisoners.

The city of Sawa was mentioned seven times in an inscription that dates back to the time of Il Sharh Yahdhib and Yazl Bayan. Another city in al-Maʿafir region, Dhabhan Dhi Hamram, was also mentioned in the South Arabian inscriptions. In a Qatabanic inscription that is known as Naqsh al-ʿUd (RES 3858), the city of Dhabhan Dhi Hamram was mentioned next to other cities, Sabir, Salman, Hamir and Hajran and a people called people of Azaz were mentioned as inhabitants of the region. Dhabhan Dhi Hamram is located in today's Mawiah and Khusha. Another city called Dhabhan Dhi Qashram is mentioned in South Arabian inscriptions and is located in today's Dhabhan sub-district.

The inscription of Samaʿ that is dated to the third century CE mentions the tribe of al-ʿArooq which is located in the al-Maʿafir region and their Himyarite king Shamar Yaḥamid. Another tribe and a city called al-Mashawilah that are located in the al-Maʿafir region mentioned in many inscriptions. One of the inscriptions says that the Himyarite king Dhamar Ali Yahbour the first sent one of his soldiers named Mabhal to spy on "Hajram Maswalam".

=== Classical sources ===
The oldest mention of al-Maʿafir region in classical sources is by Ptolemy, who called it "Maforitae". It was then mentioned in the book Periplus of the Erythraean Sea, which mentions a city, "Seua," located in "Mapharitis."

=== Islamic sources ===
Al-Maʿafir was known for its cloaks and garments, which were called "Al-Maʿafiri". A Maʿafiri garment was brought to Muhammad, and Abu Sufiyan said, "May Allah curse this fabric and who made it." Muhammad responded by saying, "don't curse them [the Maʿafiri people]: I am one of them and they are part of me".

According to Islamic sources, the Himyarite king ʼAsʿad al-Kamil covered the Kaʿaba with Maʿafiri fabrics.

== Al-Hujariah and the Yemeni Civil War ==
According to the Sanaa Center for Strategic Study, as of 2020, Al-Hujariah was "a hotbed of training camps" for irregular militias affiliated with Al-Islah, a Yemeni Islamist movement.

== Al-Hugariyyah Arabic ==
The people of al-Hujariah pronounce the letter Qaf (Arabic: ق) /q/ like Ghayn (غ) [ɣ] and Gīm (ج) /(d)ʒ/ as [ɡ]. According to ibn Mākūlā, the reason for the similarity between the Cairene pronunciation and the Hugariyyah pronunciation could be related to a story that is narrated by Muslim historians about a group of people called al-Ruʿah (shepherds) who left the Arabian Peninsula and invaded Egypt or a rumor about a man from al-Hujariah whose name was ʿAwn (عون) who ran away to Egypt and was therefore called Far ʿAwn (Far means escaped in Arabic, Farʿawn means Pharaoh).

According to Janet C. E. Watson, the phoneme jim is pronounced as voiced velar stop, /g/, in both the Cairene and the Hugaryyiah Arabic. This was probably the case in Proto-Semitic and early Pre-classical Arabic.

== Places of interest ==
ِAl-Hujariah is home to several castles, including Dolmolwah, Ibn al-Moghalis, Sodan (today known as al-Maqatirah), Jabal Thokhr, and Kharbat Saloq.

== Notable people from al-Maʿafir ==
- Muhammad Ibn Said Al Dhobhani
- Almanzor's Arab ancestors.
- Abu Bakr ibn al-Arabi
- Ibn Hisham
- Tarif ibn Malik
- Abdul Fattah Ismail

== See also ==
- At Turbah
