= Al-Qahirah district =

Coordinates: 13.5847°N 44.0100°E

Al Qahirah District مديرية القاهرة
- District
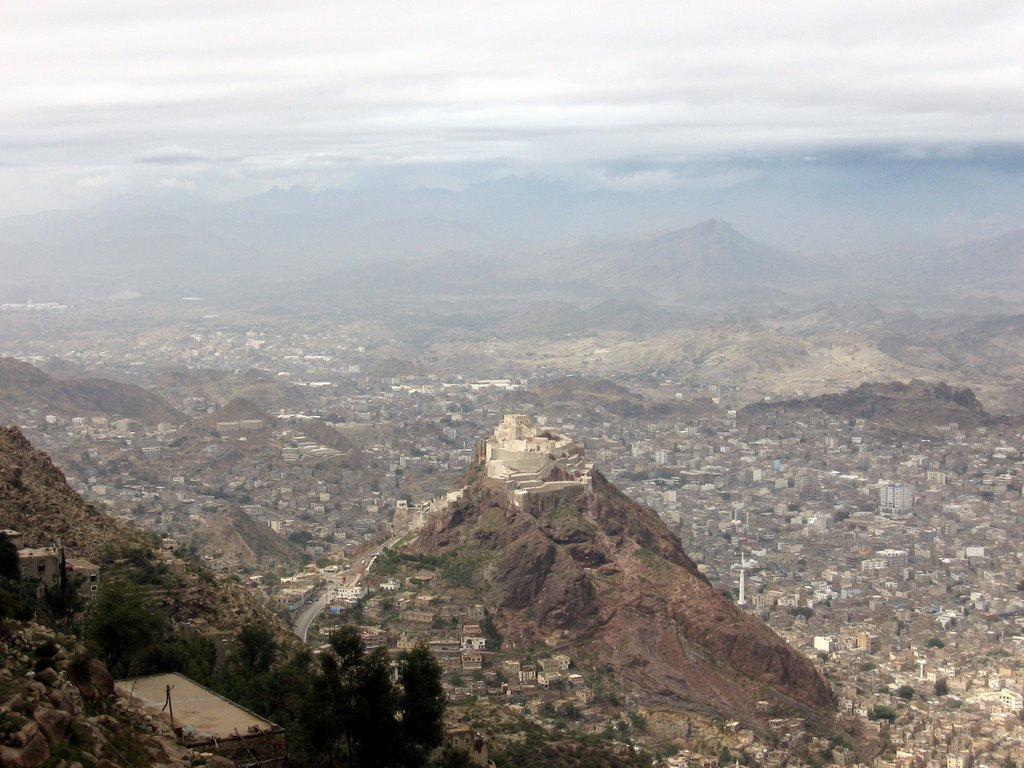
- A photo shows Al-Qahirah District
- Interactive map of Al Qahirah District
- Country: Yemen
- Governorate: Taiz

Area
  - Total: 10.2 km^{2} (3.9 sq mi)

Population (2003)
  - Total: 149,394
- Time zone: UTC+3 (Yemen Standard Time)

Al Qahirah District (Arabic: مديرية القاهرة) is a district of the Taiz Governorate, Yemen. As of 2003, the district had a population of 149,394 inhabitants.

== Location ==
A map shows districts of Taiz

It is located in the middle of Taiz city. it is bordered to the north by At Ta'iziyah, Sabir Al Mawadim to the south, Salh to the east and Al Mudhaffar to the west.
