= Bani Yousef =

Bani Yousef may refer to:

- Bani Yousef (Taiz), a sub-district in Al-Mawasit district, Taiz Governorate, Yemen
- Bani Yousef (Ibb), a sub-district in Far Al Udayn district, Ibb Governorate, Yemen
- Bani Yousef (Sanaa), a sub-district in Al Haymah Ad Dakhiliyah dDistrict, Sanaa Governorate, Yemen
