= Al-Jibzyah =

Al-Jibzyah الجبزية
- Sub-district
- Location in Yemen
- Coordinates: 13°24′34″N 44°00′01″E
- Country: Yemen
- Governorate: Taiz Governorate
- District: Al-Ma'afer District
- Elevation: 1,470 m (4,820 ft)

Population (2004)
  - Total: 8,426
- Time zone: UTC+3

Al-Jibzyah (Arabic: الجبزية) is a sub-district in the Al-Ma'afer District, Taiz Governorate, Yemen. Al-Jibzyah had a population of 8,426 at the 2004 census.
