= Al-Burihah =

Al-Burihah البريهه
- Sub-district
- Location in Yemen
- Coordinates: 13°27′48″N 43°51′42″E
- Country: Yemen
- Governorate: Taiz Governorate
- District: Jabal Habashi District
- Elevation: 1,927 m (6,322 ft)

Population (2004)
  - Total: 9,784
- Time zone: UTC+3

Al-Burihah (Arabic: البريهه) is a sub-district in the Jabal Habashi District, Taiz Governorate, Yemen. Al-Burihah's population was 9,784 at the 2004 census.
