= Akhdu' A'la =

Akhduʽ Aʽla أخدوع اعلى
- Sub-district
- Location in Yemen
- Coordinates: 13°45′40″N 43°37′16″E
- Country: Yemen
- Governorate: Taiz Governorate
- District: Maqbanah District
- Elevation: 486 m (1,594 ft)

Population (2004)
  - Total: 8,477
- Time zone: UTC+3

Akhduʽ Aʽla (Arabic: أخدوع اعلى) is a sub-district in Maqbanah District, of Taiz Governorate, Yemen. Akhduʽ Aʽla had a population of 8,477 at the 2004 census.
