= Ash-Sh'ubah =

Ash-Shʿubah الشعوبة
- Sub-district
- Location in Yemen
- Coordinates: 13°22′28″N 44°02′55″E
- Country: Yemen
- Governorate: Taiz Governorate
- District: Al-Ma'afer District
- Elevation: 1,426 m (4,678 ft)

Population (2004)
  - Total: 23,720
- Time zone: UTC+3

Ash-Shʿubah (Arabic: الشعوبة) is a Yemeni sub-district of the Al-Ma'afer District, in Taiz Governorate. Ash-Shʿubah had a population of 23,720 at the 2004 census.
