= Az-Zahari =

Az-Zahari الزهاري
- Sub-district
- Location in Yemen
- Coordinates: 13°32′24″N 43°21′22″E
- Country: Yemen
- Governorate: Taiz Governorate
- District: Al-Makha District
- Elevation: 46 m (151 ft)

Population (2004)
  - Total: 14,746
- Time zone: UTC+3

Az-Zahari (Arabic: الزهاري) is a sub-district of the Al-Makha District, in Taiz Governorate, Yemen. Az-Zahari had a population of 14,746 at the 2004 census.
