= Bani Bukari =

Bani Bukari بني بكاري
- Sub-district
- Location in Yemen
- Coordinates: 13°26′26″N 43°50′47″E
- Country: Yemen
- Governorate: Taiz Governorate
- District: Jabal Habashi District
- Elevation: 1,120 m (3,670 ft)

Population (2004)
  - Total: 6,318
- Time zone: UTC+3

Bani Bukari (Arabic: بني بكاري) is a sub-district in the Jabal Habashi District, Taiz Governorate, Yemen. Bani Bukari had a population of 6,318 at the 2004 census.
