= Bani Isa =

Bani Isa بني عيسى
- Sub-district
- Location in Yemen
- Coordinates: 13°30′47″N 43°54′40″E
- Country: Yemen
- Governorate: Taiz Governorate
- District: Jabal Habashi District
- Elevation: 1,567 m (5,141 ft)

Population (2004)
  - Total: 15,367
- Time zone: UTC+3

Bani Isa (Arabic: بني عيسى) is a sub-district in Jabal Habashi District, of Taiz Governorate, Yemen. Bani Isa's population was 15,367 at the 2004 census.
