= Al-Jabal, Yemen =

Al-Jabal الجبل
- Sub-district
- Location in Yemen
- Coordinates: 13°28′14″N 43°53′11″E
- Country: Yemen
- Governorate: Taiz Governorate
- District: Jabal Habashi District
- Elevation: 2,256 m (7,402 ft)

Population (2004)
  - Total: 3,273
- Time zone: UTC+3

Al-Jabal (Arabic: الجبل) is a sub-district located in the Jabal Habashi District, Taiz Governorate, Yemen. Al-Jabal had a population of 3,273 according to the 2004 census.
