= Al-Anbuh al-A'la =

Al-Anbuh al-A'la الانبوه الاعلى
- Sub-district
- Location in Yemen
- Coordinates: 13°22′29″N 44°00′29″E
- Country: Yemen
- Governorate: Taiz Governorate
- District: Al-Ma'afer District
- Elevation: 1,414 m (4,639 ft)

Population (2004)
  - Total: 3,171
- Time zone: UTC+3

Al-Anbuh al-A'la (Arabic: الانبوه الاعلى) is a Yemeni sub-district of the Al-Ma'afer District, in Taiz Governorate. Al-Anbuh al-A'la had a population of 3,171 at the 2004 census.
