= Al-Mashawilah =

Al-Mashawilah الكلائبة
- Sub-district
- Location in Yemen
- Coordinates: 13°11′03″N 43°44′55″E
- Country: Yemen
- Governorate: Taiz Governorate
- District: Al-Ma'afer District
- Elevation: 674 m (2,211 ft)

Population (2004)
  - Total: 17,417
- Time zone: UTC+3

Al-Mashawilah (Arabic: الكلائبة) is a Yemeni sub-district in the Al-Ma'afer District, of Taiz Governorate. Al-Mashawilah had a population of 17,417 at the 2004 census.
