= As-Sanah =

Aṣ-Ṣanah الصنة
- Sub-district
- Location in Yemen
- Coordinates: 13°20′27″N 43°59′26″E
- Country: Yemen
- Governorate: Taiz Governorate
- District: Al-Ma'afer District
- Elevation: 1,217 m (3,993 ft)

Population (2004)
  - Total: 10,170
- Time zone: UTC+3

Aṣ-Ṣanah (Arabic: الصنة) is a Yemeni sub-district in the Al-Ma'afer District, Taiz Governorate. Aṣ-Ṣanah had a population of 10,170 at to the 2004 census.
