= Ar Rahidah =

Village in Yemen

Coordinates: 13°22′41″N 44°18′14″E

Ar Rahidah (Arabic: الراهدة) is a small village in Dimnat Khadir District, Taiz Governorate of Yemen.
