= Al-Mashalihah =

Al-Mashaliḥah المشالحة
- Sub-district
- Location in Yemen
- Coordinates: 13°20′58″N 43°25′36″E
- Country: Yemen
- Governorate: Taiz Governorate
- District: Al-Makha District
- Elevation: 121 m (397 ft)

Population (2004)
  - Total: 14,527
- Time zone: UTC+3

Al-Mashaliḥah (Arabic: المشالحة) is a sub-district in the Al-Makha District, Taiz Governorate, Yemen. Al-Mashaliḥah had a population of 14,527 at the 2004 census.
