= Mirab, Yemen =

Mīrāb ميراب
- Sub-district
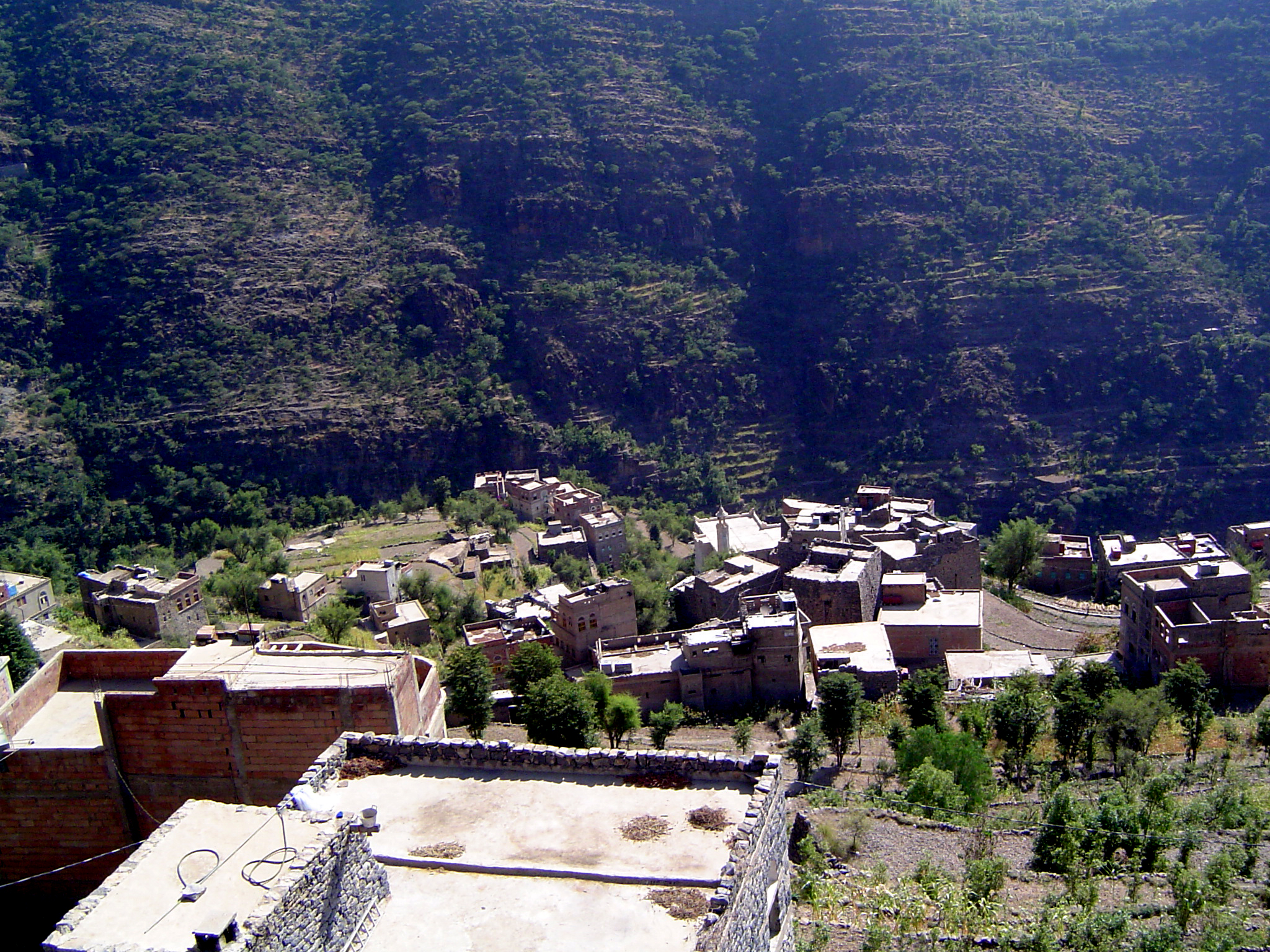
- Mirab Mountain

- Location in Yemen
- Coordinates: 13°44′14″N 43°43′25″E
- Country: Yemen
- Governorate: Taiz Governorate
- District: Maqbanah District
- Elevation: 1,359 m (4,459 ft)

Population (2004)
  - Total: 14,411
- Time zone: UTC+3

Mīrāb (Arabic: ميراب) is a sub-district in Maqbanah District, of Taiz Governorate, Yemen. Mīrāb had a population of 14,411 at the 2004 census.

== Climate ==
Mīrāb has hot deserts climate.
