= Ash-Shurajah =

Ash-Shurajah الشراجه
- Sub-district
- Location in Yemen
- Coordinates: 13°24′15″N 43°52′36″E
- Country: Yemen
- Governorate: Taiz Governorate
- District: Jabal Habashi District
- Elevation: 1,112 m (3,648 ft)

Population (2004)
  - Total: 15,371
- Time zone: UTC+3

Ash-Shurajah (Arabic: الشراجه) is a sub-district in Jabal Habashi District, Taiz Governorate, Yemen. Ash-Shurajah had a population of 15,371 at the 2004 census.
