= Al-Jum'ah =

Al-Jumʿah الجمعة
- Sub-district
- Location in Yemen
- Coordinates: 13°39′34″N 43°29′02″E
- Country: Yemen
- Governorate: Taiz Governorate
- District: Al-Makha District
- Elevation: 147 m (482 ft)

Population (2004)
  - Total: 20,423
- Time zone: UTC+3

Al-Jumʿah (Arabic: الجمعة) is a Yemeni sub-district in the Al-Makha District, of Taiz Governorate. Al-Jumʿah had a population of 20,423 at the 2004 census.
