= Al-Quhaf =

Al-Quhaf القحاف
- Sub-district
- Location in Yemen
- Coordinates: 13°28′31″N 43°56′54″E
- Country: Yemen
- Governorate: Taiz Governorate
- District: Jabal Habashi District
- Elevation: 1,580 m (5,180 ft)

Population (2004)
  - Total: 10,236
- Time zone: UTC+3

Al-Quhaf (Arabic: القحاف) is a sub-district in the Jabal Habashi District, of Taiz Governorate, Yemen. Al-Quhaf's population was 10,236 at the 2004 census.
