= Al-Akhlud =

Al-Akhlud الاخلود
- Sub-district
- Location in Yemen
- Coordinates: 13°32′24″N 43°47′24″E
- Country: Yemen
- Governorate: Taiz Governorate
- District: Maqbanah District
- Elevation: 839 m (2,753 ft)

Population (2004)
  - Total: 7,189
- Time zone: UTC+3

Al-Akhlud (Arabic: الاخلود) is a sub-district in Maqbanah District, Taiz Governorate, Yemen. Al-Akhlud had a population of 7,189 at the 2004 census.
