= Yakhtul =

Yakhtul يختل
- Village
- Location in Yemen
- Coordinates: 13°26′53″N 43°16′12″E
- Country: Yemen
- Governorate: Taiz Governorate
- District: Al Mukha District
- Time zone: UTC+6.30 (MST)

Yakhtul (Arabic: يختل) is a large coastal fishing village in the Taiz Governorate of southwestern Yemen. Yakhtul is located about 10 miles (16 km) north of the city of Mokha. It contains a number of white houses, the Yakhtul Mosque and a school.

== History ==
During World War I, British patrol vessels shelled Dhubab fort in November 1914 and opened fire on Yakhtul on 8 December 1914, damaging 7 or 8 dhows moored there.

== Geography ==
Yakhtul lies on the coast of the Red Sea, at the head of a small shoal inlet, 10 miles (16 km) north of Mokha. Jirdan lies farther to the north of Yakhtul, 'Abus to the southeast and Kudhaysah to the northeast. The nine-mile (14 km) stretch between Yakhtul and Marsa Farjah has numerous sand and coral patches which give the sea a dark grey colour. The stretch between Yakhtul and Al Zahari contains coastal palm groves.

== Economy ==
MEED describes Yakhtul as being tourist oriented. Fishing is a major source of income for the locals. As of 1996, despite many of the houses having their own wells, high water salinity meant that it could only be used for bathing and cleaning, and drinking water had to be imported. However, the local diet is said to meet the World Health Organization minimum requirements, with a plentiful supply of nutrients from fresh fish and other local commodities. A French medical team was reported to be operating in Yakhtul in the mid-1980s.

== Notable landmarks ==
Yakhtul is described as consisting of "a few white houses, some huts, and a mosque." The town contains Yakhtul Mosque, which was said to have been "built at the expense of the good people of the area at a cost of one million riyals." The same man who built the mosque also established Yakhtul preparatory school in the town, at a cost of 150,000 riyals. The "first phases of construction work" were reported to have been completed in 1989.

At the village is what is called "Dar al-milh" (the place of salt). The salt pans, called darah are said to be "cut out of the hard ground and the soil heaped up on the sides to form bunds (zabir al-darah).
