= Akhdu' Asfal =

Akhduʿ Asfal أخدوع اسفل
- Sub-district
- Location in Yemen
- Coordinates: 13°52′17″N 43°37′18″E
- Country: Yemen
- Governorate: Taiz Governorate
- District: Maqbanah District
- Elevation: 409 m (1,342 ft)

Population (2004)
  - Total: 3,540
- Time zone: UTC+3

Akhduʿ Asfal (Arabic: أخدوع اسفل) is a sub-district in the Maqbanah District, Taiz Governorate, Yemen. Akhduʿ Asfal had a population of 3,540 at the 2004 census.
