= Al-Kala'bah =

Al-Kalaʾbah الكلائبة
- Sub-district
- Location in Yemen
- Coordinates: 13°27′03″N 43°59′16″E
- Country: Yemen
- Governorate: Taiz Governorate
- District: Al-Ma'afer District
- Elevation: 1,177 m (3,862 ft)

Population (2004)
  - Total: 12,619
- Time zone: UTC+3

Al-Kalaʾbah (Arabic: الكلائبة) is a Yemeni sub-district in the Al-Ma'afer District, of Taiz Governorate. At the 2004 census, Al-Kalaʾbah had a population of 12,619.
