= Al-Misrakh district =

Coordinates: 13.4700°N 44.0375°E

Al Misrakh District مديرية المسراخ
- District
- Interactive map of Al Misrakh District
- Country: Yemen
- Governorate: Taiz

Area
  - Total: 91.5 km^{2} (35.3 sq mi)

Population (2003)
  - Total: 112,653
- Time zone: UTC+3 (Yemen Standard Time)

Al Misrakh District (Arabic: مديرية المسراخ) is a district of the Taiz Governorate, Yemen. As of 2003, the district had a population of 112,653 inhabitants.

== Location ==
A map shows districts of Taiz

It is located in the middle part of Taiz governorate. It is bordered by Mashra'a Wa Hadnan to the north, Sabir Al Mawadim to the east, Sabir Al Mawadim and Al Ma'afer to the west, Same'a to the south.

== Uzaal and villages of Al Misrakh district ==
Rural districts in Yemen are divided into 'Uzaal, which are further divided into villages. There are twelve Uzaal in Al Misrakh district.

- 'Arsh
- Al-Aqrud
- Anbiyān
- Hasban A'la
- Hasban Asfal
- Jarah
- Khurishah
- Masfar
- Sanamat
- Taluq
- Watir
- Abdan
