= Al-Maratibah =

Al-Maratibah المراتبه
- Sub-district
- Location in Yemen
- Coordinates: 13°29′25″N 43°49′26″E
- Country: Yemen
- Governorate: Taiz Governorate
- District: Jabal Habashi District
- Elevation: 1,098 m (3,602 ft)

Population (2004)
  - Total: 16,188
- Time zone: UTC+3

Al-Maratibah (Arabic: المراتبه) is a sub-district of Jabal Habashi District, Taiz Governorate, Yemen. Al-Maratibah had a population of 16,188 at the 2004 census.
