= Al-Haql =

Al-Ḥaql الحقل
- Sub-district
- Location in Yemen
- Coordinates: 13°27′32″N 43°54′46″E
- Country: Yemen
- Governorate: Taiz Governorate
- District: Jabal Habashi District
- Elevation: 1,734 m (5,689 ft)

Population (2004)
  - Total: 6,260
- Time zone: UTC+3

Al-Ḥaql (Arabic: الحقل) is a sub-district in Jabal Habashi District, Taiz Governorate, Yemen. Al-Ḥaql had a population of 6,260 at the 2004 census.
