= Ayed =

Ayed (Arabic: عايد or عايض) is an Arabic surname. Notable people with this surname include:

- Amani Ayed (born 2006), Swedish-Tunisian footballer
- Anouar Ayed (born 1978), Tunisian handball player
- Hamdi Ayed (born 1993), Qatari handball player
- Lotfi Ayed (born 1959), Swedish boxer
- Makrem Ayed (born 1973), Tunisian judoka
- Mohammed Ali Ayed, Emirati footballer
- Mohsen Ayed, Yemeni human rights activist
- Mraljeb Ayed Mansoor (born 1939), Kuwaiti long-distance runner
- Nahlah Ayed, Canadian journalist
- Rajaei Ayed, Jordanian footballer
- Momo Ayed (1957–2022), Belgian football manager

== Given name ==
- Ayed (singer) (born 1996), Saudi singer
- Ayed Zatar (born 1996), Paraguayan tennis player
