= Nimrah, Yemen =

Nimrah نمره
- Sub-district
- Location in Yemen
- Coordinates: 13°29′10″N 43°54′51″E
- Country: Yemen
- Governorate: Taiz Governorate
- District: Jabal Habashi District
- Elevation: 1,606 m (5,269 ft)

Population (2004)
  - Total: 2,445
- Time zone: UTC+3

Nimrah (Arabic: نمره) is a sub-district located in the Jabal Habashi District, Taiz Governorate, Yemen. Nimrah had a population of 2,445 according to the 2004 census.
