= Almaan, Mawiyah =

Almaan
- Country: Yemen
- Governorate: Taiz

Population (2004)
  - Total: 717
- Time zone: UTC+3 (Yemen Standard Time)

Almaan is a village in the Taiz Governorate, Yemen, belonging administratively to Mawiyah District. It has a population of 717 people, according to statistics in 2004.
