= Akhmour =

Akhmour أخمور
- Sub-district
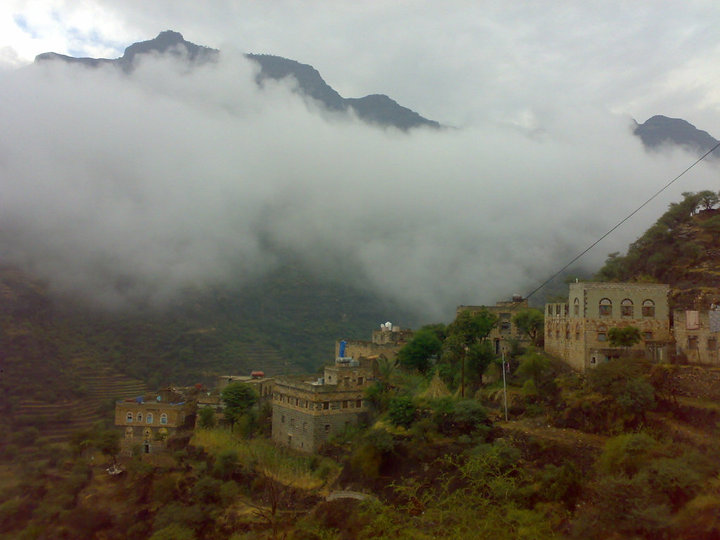
- Part of Akhmour in al-Hujariah

- Location in Yemen
- Coordinates: 13°18′01″N 44°00′34″E
- Country: Yemen
- Governorate: Taiz Governorate
- District: Al-Mawasit District

Population (2004)
  - Total: 6,553
- Time zone: UTC+3

Akhmour (Arabic: أخمور) is a sub-district of the Al-Mawasit District, Taiz Governorate, Yemen. Akhmour had a population of 6,553 at the 2004 census.

== Villages ==
- Akhmour Dakhal
- Akhmour Kharij
