= Ar-Ra'inah =

Ar-Raʿinah الرعينة
- Sub-district
- Location in Yemen
- Coordinates: 13°43′09″N 43°52′44″E
- Country: Yemen
- Governorate: Taiz Governorate
- District: Shar'ab ar-Rawnah District

Population (2004)
  - Total: 10,021
- Time zone: UTC+3

Ar-Raʿinah (Arabic: الرعينة) is a sub-district in the Shar'ab ar-Rawnah District, Taiz Governorate, Yemen. Ar-Raʿinah had a population of 10,021 at the 2004 census.
