= Al-Jada'an =

Al-Jada'an الجدعان
- Sub-district
- Location in Yemen
- Coordinates: 15°11′56″N 43°54′28″E
- Country: Yemen
- Governorate: Sana'a Governorate
- District: Al Haymah Ad Dakhiliyah District

Population (2004)
  - Total: 3,645
- Time zone: UTC+3

Al-Jada'an (Arabic: الجدعان) is a sub-district located in the Al Haymah Ad Dakhiliyah District, Sana'a Governorate, Yemen. Al-Jada'an had a population of 3645 according to the 2004 census.
