= Hasban Asfal =

Ḩaşbān Asfal حصبان اسفل
- Sub-district
- Location in Yemen
- Coordinates: 13°28′36″N 44°00′51″E
- Country: Yemen
- Governorate: Taiz Governorate
- District: Al-Misrakh District
- Elevation: 1,352 m (4,436 ft)

Population (2004)
  - Total: 1,564
- Time zone: UTC+3

Ḩaşbān Asfal (Arabic: حصبان اسفل) is a sub-district located in the Al-Misrakh District, Taiz Governorate, Yemen. Ḩaşbān Asfal had a population of 1,564 according to the 2004 census.

== Villages ==
- Al-damanah village.
- 'Aruykibuh village.
- Al-maesuq village.
- Al-muhabih village.
- Al-zuhur village.
- Al-mahatuh village.
- Al-qahfuh village.
- Fafrat Al-sanahi village.
- Habab village.
- Hawl Al-Souq village.
- Al-'Ariduh village.
- Al-ahwab village.
- Dar Al-darae village.
- Al-jabijab village.
- Habil Jabba' village.
- Al-Habishah village.
- Al-sahlulh village.
- Al-'ard village.
- Al-saafih village.
- Al-muqidihiah village.
- Al'ahar village.
