= Al-Aʽlūm =

Al-Aʽlūm الاعلوم
- Sub-district
- Location in Yemen
- Coordinates: 13°20′08″N 44°03′13″E
- Country: Yemen
- Governorate: Taiz Governorate
- District: Al-Mawasit District

Population (2004)
  - Total: 5,804
- Time zone: UTC+3

Al-Aʽlūm (Arabic: الاعلوم) is a sub-district located in the Al-Mawasit District, Taiz Governorate, Yemen. Al-Aʿlūm had a population of 5,804 at the 2004 census.

== Villages ==
- ʿOfailah
- Al-Buhim
- Al-Zaribah
- Muqasher
- Shaʿb Zoraiʿ
- Al-Dhiraʿ
- Bolabil
