= Al-Ayfū' =

Al-Ayfūʿ الايفوع
- Sub-district
- Location in Yemen
- Coordinates: 13°17′27″N 44°02′35″E
- Country: Yemen
- Governorate: Taiz Governorate
- District: Al-Mawasit District

Population (2004)
  - Total: 11,452
- Time zone: UTC+3

Al-Ayfūʿ (Arabic: الايفوع) is a sub-district of the Al-Mawasit District, Taiz Governorate, Yemen. Al-Ayfūʿ had a population of 11,452 at the 2004 census.

== Villages ==
- Al-Wahbanah
- Naḥmah
- Ḥazman Asfal
- Ḥazman Aʿla
- Saqman
- Bani Jabir
- Ash-Shoʿub
- Al-Fawadaʿ
- Kharah
- Garzabah
- Wadi as-Sulam
- Wadi ʿAden
- Al-Maʿmariah
