= Bani Hammad =

Bani Hammad بني حماد
- Sub-district
- Location in Yemen
- Coordinates: 13°17′26″N 44°05′08″E
- Country: Yemen
- Governorate: Taiz Governorate
- District: Al-Mawasit District

Population (2004)
  - Total: 21,987
- Time zone: UTC+3

Bani Hammad (Arabic: بني حماد) is a sub-district of the Al-Mawasit District, Taiz Governorate, Yemen. Bani Hammad had a population of 21,987 at the 2004 census.

== Villages ==
- Al-Ḥaqibah
- Bani Hasan Raʿiah
- Uzlat al-Jibal
- Al-Bahmah
- Bani Sinan
- Yafiq
- Bani Hasan Wa Bani Wagih
- Al-Maʿinah
- Bani Samiʿa
- Bani Afif
- Al-Minam
- Al-Da'bah
- Al-ʿAjilah
