= Al-Suwa'a =

Al-Suwaʾ السواء
- Sub-district
- Location in Yemen
- Coordinates: 13°22′23″N 43°56′29″E
- Country: Yemen
- Governorate: Taiz Governorate
- District: Al-Ma'afer District
- Elevation: 1,335 m (4,380 ft)

Population (2004)
  - Total: 35,401
- Time zone: UTC+3

Al-Suwaʾ (Arabic: السواء) is a sub-district in the Al-Ma'afer District, Taiz Governorate, Yemen. Al-Suwaʾ had a population of 35,401 at the 2004 census.
