= Arsh =

Arsh or ARSH may refer to:

- ARSH, a type of arylsulfatase
- 'Arsh, a place in Taiz Governorate, Yemen
- Al-Arsh, or Throne of God, in Islam
- Arsh, a star in the constellation Lepus
- Arsh, an ethnic group of the Koibal people in Southern Siberia

== See also ==
- Arsha (disambiguation)
- Arshi, a character in the Mahabharat
