= Ash-Sha'banyah as-Sufla =

Ash-Shaʿbanyah as-Sufla الشعبانيه السفلى
- Sub-district
- Location in Yemen
- Coordinates: 13°37′26″N 44°02′56″E
- Country: Yemen
- Governorate: Taiz Governorate
- District: At-Ta'iziyah District
- Elevation: 1,344 m (4,409 ft)

Population (2004)
  - Total: 9,259
- Time zone: UTC+3

Ash-Shaʿbanyah as-Sufla (Arabic: الشعبانيه السفلى) is a sub-district in the At-Ta'iziyah District, Taiz Governorate, Yemen. Ash-Shaʿbanyah as-Sufla had a population of 9,259 at the 2004 census.
