= Alrkph, Mawiyah =

Alrkph
- Country: Yemen
- Governorate: Taiz

Population (2004)
  - Total: 110
- Time zone: UTC+3 (Yemen Standard Time)

Alrkph is a village in the Republic of Yemen within the Taiz Governorate, Yemen, and administratively attached to Mawiyah District. With a population of 110 people, according to statistics in 2004
