= Al-Aj'ud =

Al-Ajʿud الأجعود
- Sub-district
- Location in Yemen
- Coordinates: 13°41′52″N 44°00′11″E
- Country: Yemen
- Governorate: Taiz Governorate
- District: At-Ta'iziyah District
- Elevation: 1,243 m (4,078 ft)

Population (2004)
  - Total: 4,536
- Time zone: UTC+3

Al-Ajʿud (Arabic: الأجعود) is a sub-district of At-Ta'iziyah District, in Taiz Governorate, Yemen. Al-Ajʿud had a population of 4,536 at the 2004 census.
