= Sanamat =

Ṣanamat صنمات
- Sub-district
- Location in Yemen
- Coordinates: 13°28′55″N 44°02′08″E
- Country: Yemen
- Governorate: Taiz Governorate
- District: Al-Misrakh District
- Elevation: 2,097 m (6,880 ft)

Population (2004)
  - Total: 5,396
- Time zone: UTC+3

Ṣanamat (Arabic: صنمات) is a sub-district located in the Al-Misrakh District, Taiz Governorate, Yemen. Ṣanamat had a population of 5,396 according to the 2004 census.

== Villages ==
- Sanamat village.
- Al-Kahlabi village.
- Al-'Uqur village.
- Al-Hiaj village.
- Al-Mawqie village.
- Al-Mahfir village.
