= Al-Ja'di =

Al-Jaʿdi الجعدي
- Sub-district
- Location in Yemen
- Coordinates: 13°47′03″N 43°57′42″E
- Country: Yemen
- Governorate: Taiz Governorate
- District: At-Ta'iziyah District
- Elevation: 1,462 m (4,797 ft)

Population (2004)
  - Total: 1,838
- Time zone: UTC+3

Al-Jaʿdi (Arabic: الجعدي) is a sub-district of the At-Ta'iziyah District, Taiz Governorate, Yemen. Al-Jaʿdi had a population of 1,838 at to the 2004 census.
