= Al-Malawhah =

Al-Malawhah الملاوحة
- Sub-district
- Location in Yemen
- Coordinates: 13°51′20″N 43°46′09″E
- Country: Yemen
- Governorate: Taiz Governorate
- District: Shar'ab ar-Rawnah District

Population (2004)
  - Total: 5,325
- Time zone: UTC+3

Al-Malawhah (Arabic: الملاوحة) is a sub-district located in the Shar'ab ar-Rawnah District, Taiz Governorate, Yemen. Al-Malawhah had a population of 5,325 at the 2004 census.
