= Al-Khallal =

Al-Khallal is a surname. Notable people with the surname include:

- Abu Bakr al-Khallal (died 923), an early Muslim jurist
- Abu Salama Hafs ibn Sulayman al-Khallal (fl. 749), an early Muslim missionary

== See also ==
- Al-khalal, Mawiyah, a village in the Taiz Governorate, Yemen
