= Same'a district =

Coordinates: 13.3808°N 44.1164°E

Same'a District مديرية سامع
- District
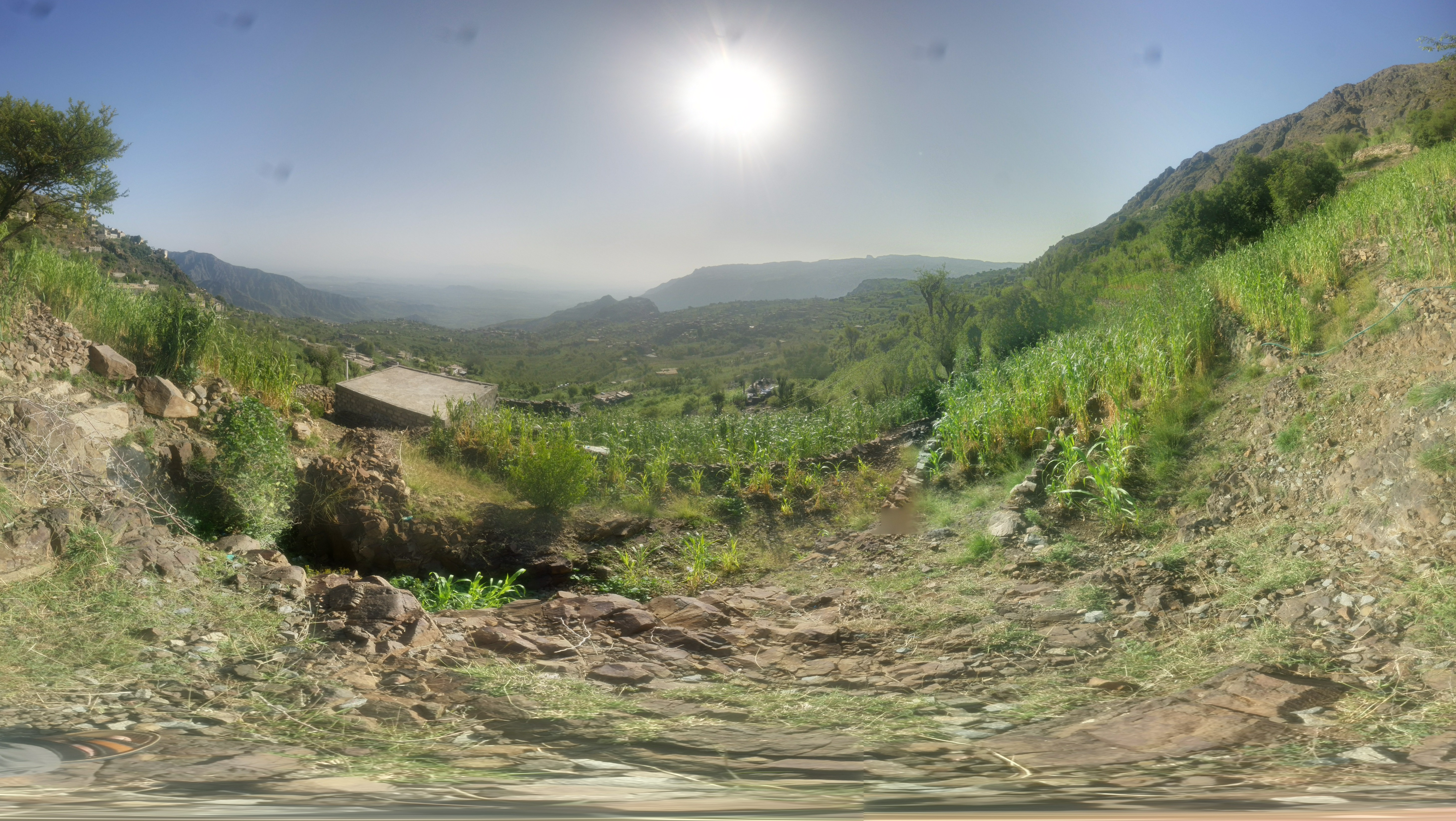
- Photo of Horat Markaz Al-mudiria village
- Interactive map of Same'a District
- Country: Yemen
- Governorate: Taiz

Population (2003)
  - Total: 41,464
- Time zone: UTC+3 (Yemen Standard Time)

Same'a District (Arabic: مديرية سامع) is a district of the Taiz Governorate, Yemen. As of 2003, the district had a population of 41,464 inhabitants.

== Location ==
A map shows districts of Taiz

Located in the southern part of Taiz governorate, the district is bordered by Dimnat Khadir to the north, Al-Mawasit to the south, As Silw to the east and Al-Ma'afer to the west.

== Uzaal and villages of Same'a district ==
Rural districts in Yemen are divided into 'Uzaal and further divided into villages. There is only one Uzlah in Same'a district.

=== Uzlat Same'a ===
- Horat Markaz Al-mudiria village.
- Al-thija' village.
- Al-wasita village.
- Bakian village.
- Nahman village.
- Hawra village.
- Al-khadra' village.
- 'Adhan village.
- Al-salaf village.
- Sarabit 'Uela(upper Sarabit) village.
- Sarabit Asfal(lower Sarabit) village.
- Mawqieih village.
- Qa'an village.
- Al-madhabah village.
- Al-kharayib village.
- Al-jiba village.
- Al-diya' village.
- Al-akym village.
- Al-mayasin village.
- Al-bals village.
- Mushrifa village.
- Damnat Same'a village.
- Al-birah village.
- Al-rahiuh village.
- Al-najid village.
- Harur village.
- Hamaan village.
- Bani Tamim village.
- Al-khanf village.
- Dhi Qatish village.
- Al-qatb village.
- Al-muhirib village.
- Hafarat village.
- 'Aridat Shari' village.
- 'Arajish village.
