= Mawiya =

Mawiya or Mawiyah may refer to:

- Mawiyya (died 425), Syrian queen
- Mawiya, Yemen
