= Hadhran =

Ḥaḏran حذران
- Sub-district
- Location in Yemen
- Coordinates: 13°36′41″N 43°55′58″E
- Country: Yemen
- Governorate: Taiz Governorate
- District: At-Ta'iziyah District
- Elevation: 1,049 m (3,442 ft)

Population (2004)
  - Total: 10,451
- Time zone: UTC+3

Ḥaḏran (Arabic: حذران) is a sub-district in the At-Ta'iziyah District, Taiz Governorate, Yemen. Ḥaḏran had a population of 10,451 at the 2004 census.
