= Al-Hayajim =

Al-Hayajim الهياجم
- Sub-district
- Location in Yemen
- Coordinates: 13°46′31″N 43°45′45″E
- Country: Yemen
- Governorate: Taiz Governorate
- District: Shar'ab ar-Rawnah District

Population (2004)
  - Total: 7,102
- Time zone: UTC+3

Al-Hayajim or Al-Hayagim (Arabic: الهياجم) is a sub-district in the Shar'ab ar-Rawnah District, Taiz Governorate, Yemen. Al-Hayajim had a population of 7,102 according at the 2004 census.
