= Watir, Taiz =

Watir وتير
- Sub-district
- Location in Yemen
- Coordinates: 13°30′45″N 44°01′35″E
- Country: Yemen
- Governorate: Taiz Governorate
- District: Al-Misrakh District
- Elevation: 2,323 m (7,621 ft)

Population (2004)
  - Total: 4,211
- Time zone: UTC+3

Watir (Arabic: وتير) is a sub-district located in the Al-Misrakh District, Taiz Governorate, Yemen. Watir had a population of 4,211 according to the 2004 census.

== Villages ==
- Zahirat Watir village.
- Al-Masajeed village.
- 'Aqin village.
- Al-thawjun village.
- Al-Muzahad village.
- Al-Mahja' village.
- Wadi al-'Arsh village.
- Dharhabah village.
