= Al-Esrar =

Al-Eṣrar الاصرار
- Sub-district
- Location in Yemen
- Coordinates: 13°38′15″N 44°05′56″E
- Country: Yemen
- Governorate: Taiz Governorate
- District: At-Ta'iziyah District
- Elevation: 1,514 m (4,967 ft)

Population (2004)
  - Total: 11,384
- Time zone: UTC+3

Al-Eṣrar (Arabic: الاصرار) is a Yemeni sub-district in the At-Ta'iziyah District, Taiz Governorate. At the 2004 census, its population was 11,384.
