= Blad al-Qabayl =

Blad al-Qabayl بلاد القبائل
- Sub-district
- Location in Yemen
- Country: Yemen
- Governorate: Sana'a Governorate
- District: Al Haymah Ad Dakhiliyah District

Population (2004)
  - Total: 10,761
- Time zone: UTC+3

Blad al-Qabayl (Arabic: بلاد القبائل) is a sub-district located in the Al Haymah Ad Dakhiliyah District, Sana'a Governorate, Yemen. Blad al-Qabayl had a population of 10761 according to the 2004 census.
