= Anbiyān =

Anbiyān انبيان
- Sub-district
- Location in Yemen
- Coordinates: 13°30′28″N 44°00′14″E
- Country: Yemen
- Governorate: Taiz Governorate
- District: Al-Misrakh District

Population (2004)
  - Total: 2,742
- Time zone: UTC+3

Anbiyān (Arabic: انبيان) is a sub-district located in the Al-Misrakh District, Taiz Governorate, Yemen. Anbiyān had a population of 2,742 according to the 2004 census.

== Villages ==
- Dhi ash-Sharḥ
- Al-Kashrar
- Al-Lafag
- Dhahrat Anbiyan
