= Taluq, Taiz =

Ṭaluq طالوق
- Sub-district
- Location in Yemen
- Coordinates: 13°30′32″N 43°59′06″E
- Country: Yemen
- Governorate: Taiz Governorate
- District: Al-Misrakh District
- Elevation: 1,424 m (4,672 ft)

Population (2004)
  - Total: 3,229
- Time zone: UTC+3

Ṭaluq (Arabic: طالوق) is a sub-district located in the Al-Misrakh District, Taiz Governorate, Yemen. Ṭaluq had a population of 3,229 according to the 2004 census.

== Villages ==
- Nariqah village.
- Al-Najeed village.
- Bani Mansur village.
