= Bani Ziad =

Bani Ziad بني زياد
- Sub-district
- Location in Yemen
- Coordinates: 13°48′57″N 43°47′46″E
- Country: Yemen
- Governorate: Taiz Governorate
- District: Shar'ab ar-Rawnah District

Population (2004)
  - Total: 6,999
- Time zone: UTC+3

Bani Ziad (Arabic: بني زياد) is a sub-district located in the Shar'ab ar-Rawnah District, Taiz Governorate, Yemen. Bani Ziad had a population of 6,999 at the 2004 census.
