= Al-Asad (Taiz) =

Al-Asad الأسد
- Sub-district
- Location in Yemen
- Coordinates: 13°44′12″N 43°45′05″E
- Country: Yemen
- Governorate: Taiz Governorate
- District: Shar'ab ar-Rawnah District

Population (2004)
  - Total: 10,994
- Time zone: UTC+3

Al-Asad (Arabic: الأسد) is a sub-district located in the Shar'ab ar-Rawnah District, Taiz Governorate, Yemen. Al-Asad had a population of 10,994 at the 2004 census.
