= Al-Haymah as-Sufla =

Al-Ḥaymah as-Sufla الحيمة السفلى
- Sub-district
- Location in Yemen
- Coordinates: 13°42′20″N 44°03′37″E
- Country: Yemen
- Governorate: Taiz Governorate
- District: At-Ta'iziyah District
- Elevation: 1,370 m (4,490 ft)

Population (2004)
  - Total: 8,300
- Time zone: UTC+3

Al-Ḥaymah as-Sufla (Arabic: الحيمة السفلى) is a sub-district of the At-Ta'iziyah District, in Taiz Governorate, Yemen. Al-Ḥaymah as-Sufla had a population of 8,300 at the 2004 census.
