= Al-Hashamah =

Al-Hashamah الهشمة
- Sub-district
- Location in Yemen
- Coordinates: 13°38′06″N 43°58′51″E
- Country: Yemen
- Governorate: Taiz Governorate
- District: At-Ta'iziyah District
- Elevation: 1,093 m (3,586 ft)

Population (2004)
  - Total: 14,246
- Time zone: UTC+3

Al-Hashamah (Arabic: الهشمة) is a sub-district in the At-Ta'iziyah District, Taiz Governorate, Yemen. Al-Hashamah had a population of 14,246 at the 2004 census.
