= Al-Haymah al-Olya =

Al-Ḥaymah al-ʿOlya الحيمة العليا
- Sub-district
- Location in Yemen
- Coordinates: 13°45′10″N 44°04′28″E
- Country: Yemen
- Governorate: Taiz Governorate
- District: At-Ta'iziyah District
- Elevation: 1,476 m (4,843 ft)

Population (2004)
  - Total: 9,456
- Time zone: UTC+3

Al-Ḥaymah al-ʿOlya (Arabic: الحيمة العليا) is a sub-district in the At-Ta'iziyah District, Taiz Governorate, Yemen. Al-Ḥaymah al-ʿOlya had a population of 9,456 at the 2004 census.
