= Al-Masnah =

Al-Masnaḥ المسنح
- Sub-district
- Location in Yemen
- Coordinates: 13°40′11″N 44°03′37″E
- Country: Yemen
- Governorate: Taiz Governorate
- District: At-Ta'iziyah District
- Elevation: 1,289 m (4,229 ft)

Population (2004)
  - Total: 1,862
- Time zone: UTC+3

Al-Masnaḥ (Arabic: المسنح) is a sub-district in the At-Ta'iziyah District, of Taiz Governorate, Yemen. Al-Masnaḥ had a population of 1,862 at the 2004 census.
