= Bani Sari =

Bani Sari بني سري
- Sub-district
- Location in Yemen
- Coordinates: 13°48′31″N 43°49′27″E
- Country: Yemen
- Governorate: Taiz Governorate
- District: Shar'ab ar-Rawnah District

Population (2004)
  - Total: 7,914
- Time zone: UTC+3

Bani Sari (Arabic: بني سري) is a sub-district in the Shar'ab ar-Rawnah District, Taiz Governorate, Yemen. Bani Sari had a population of 7,914 at to the 2004 census.
