= Al-Janadyah as-Sufla =

Al-Janadyah as-Sufla عزلة الجنديه السفلى
- Sub-district
- Country: Yemen
- Governorate: Taiz Governorate
- District: At-Ta'iziyah District

Population (2004)
  - Total: 13,162
- Time zone: UTC+3

Al-Janadyah as-Sufla (Arabic: عزلة الجنديه السفلى) is a sub-district of At-Ta'iziyah District, Taiz Governorate, Yemen. Al-Janadyah as-Sufla had a population of 13,162 at the 2004 census.
