= Khurishah =

Khurishah خريشة
- Sub-district
- Location in Yemen
- Coordinates: 13°28′40″N 44°02′44″E
- Country: Yemen
- Governorate: Taiz Governorate
- District: Al-Misrakh District
- Elevation: 1,908 m (6,260 ft)

Population (2004)
  - Total: 1,564
- Time zone: UTC+3

Khurishah (Arabic: خريشة) is a sub-district located in the Al-Misrakh District, Taiz Governorate, Yemen. Khurishah had a population of 1,564 according to the 2004 census.

== Villages ==
- Khurishah Al-suflaa village.
- Khurishah AL-'ulyaa village.
