= Bani Muhalhil =

Bani Muhalhil بني مهلهل
- Sub-district
- Location in Yemen
- Coordinates: 15°11′19″N 43°52′20″E
- Country: Yemen
- Governorate: Sana'a Governorate
- District: Al Haymah Ad Dakhiliyah District

Population (2004)
  - Total: 6,329
- Time zone: UTC+3

Bani Muhalhil (Arabic: بني مهلهل) is a sub-district located in the Al Haymah Ad Dakhiliyah District, Sana'a Governorate, Yemen. Bani Muhalhil had a population of 6329 according to the 2004 census.
