= Dhubab =

Dhubab ذو باب (Arabic)
- Town
- Location in Yemen
- Coordinates: 12.944839°N 43.416595°E
- Country: Yemen
- Governorate: Taiz Governorate
- District: Dhubab District

Population (2004)
  - Total: 4,050

Dhubab (Note: Also spelt Dubab or Zubab) (Note: Arabic: ذو باب, romanized: Dhū Bāb or Arabic: ذباب, romanized: Dhubāb) is a small coastal town in the Taiz Governorate of south-western Yemen. It is the seat of Dhubab District.

== History ==
During World War I, British patrol vessels shelled Dhubab fort in November 1914. They later opened fire on Yakhtul on 8 December 1914, damaging seven or eight dhows moored there.

The 1915 British military handbook Routes in Arabia described Dubab as a village consisting of a few huts, with very scarce water. It listed the village as a stopping point on the camel route from Cheikh Said to Mokha. The route followed the telegraph line linking the two settlements.

In March 2015 it was occupied by Houthi forces. On 7 January 2017 the village was returned to the Saudi backed government as part of "Operation Golden Spear". On 10 September 2026, the village and district were captured by the Houthis during their offensive.

== Geography ==
Dhubab lies on the coast of the Red Sea on a jutting headland, 46.6 kilometres by road south of Mokha and north of Mayyun.

== Economy ==
In 2020, the International Committee of the Red Cross (ICRC) reported that residents depended on fishing for their livelihoods. Boat maintenance, fuel and equipment absorbed most fishing income, while high fuel prices, inflation and conflict reduced profits. Strong seasonal winds made fishing dangerous and, together with low catches, reduced earnings for part of the year. The report also described how displacement away from the coast had disrupted fishing families' livelihoods and left them in debt.

== Sources ==
- Ari, Lior Ben (2026-09-10). "Houthi blitz reaches Bab al-Mandab as rebels reportedly seize strategic Red Sea island". Ynet.
- Bing Maps (Map). Microsoft and Harris Corporation Earthstar Geographics LLC.
- General Staff, India (1915). "Route No. 123: From Shaikh Sa'id to Mokha". Routes in Arabia. Simla – via Qatar Digital Library.
- Maps (Map). Google Maps.
- International Committee of the Red Cross (2020-12-15). "Yemen: Small Boats... Full-scale Wars".
- Serjeant, Robert Bertram; Bidwell, Robin Leonard (21 July 2005). Arabian Studies. Cambridge University Press. ISBN 978-0-521-01729-9.
