= Ad-Da'aysah =

Ad-Daʿaysah الدعيسة
- Sub-district
- Location in Yemen
- Coordinates: 13°39′04″N 43°53′21″E
- Country: Yemen
- Governorate: Taiz Governorate
- District: At-Ta'iziyah District
- Elevation: 928 m (3,045 ft)

Population (2004)
  - Total: 8,957
- Time zone: UTC+3

Ad-Daʿaysah (Arabic: الدعيسة) is a Yemeni sub-district in the At-Ta'iziyah District of Taiz Governorate. At the 2004 census, Ad-Daʿaysah had a population of 8,957.
