= Murkhah =

Murkhah مورخة
- Sub-district
- Location in Yemen
- Coordinates: 13°46′34″N 43°49′51″E
- Country: Yemen
- Governorate: Taiz Governorate
- District: Shar'ab ar-Rawnah District

Population (2004)
  - Total: 2,026
- Time zone: UTC+3

Murkhah (Arabic: مورخة) is a sub-district in the Shar'ab ar-Rawnah District, Taiz Governorate, Yemen. Murkhah had a population of 2,026 at the 2004 census.
