= Bani Sumi' =

Bani Sumiʿ بني سميع
- Sub-district
- Location in Yemen
- Coordinates: 13°48′23″N 43°46′14″E
- Country: Yemen
- Governorate: Taiz Governorate
- District: Shar'ab ar-Rawnah District

Population (2004)
  - Total: 6,692
- Time zone: UTC+3

Bani Sumiʿ (Arabic: بني سميع) is a sub-district located in the Shar'ab ar-Rawnah District, Taiz Governorate, Yemen. Bani Sumiʿ had a population of 6,692 at the 2004 census.
