= Sharqi Himyar =

Sharqi Himyar شرقي حمير
- Sub-district
- Location in Yemen
- Coordinates: 13°43′07″N 43°48′47″E
- Country: Yemen
- Governorate: Taiz Governorate
- District: Shar'ab ar-Rawnah District

Population (2004)
  - Total: 21,448
- Time zone: UTC+3

Sharqi Himyar (Arabic: شرقي حمير) is a sub-district of the Shar'ab ar-Rawnah District, Taiz Governorate, Yemen. Sharqi Himyar had a population of 21,448 at the 2004 census.
