= Jarah, Taiz =

Jarah جارة
- Sub-district
- Location in Yemen
- Coordinates: 13°30′05″N 44°00′57″E
- Country: Yemen
- Governorate: Taiz Governorate
- District: Al-Misrakh District
- Elevation: 1,605 m (5,266 ft)

Population (2004)
  - Total: 1,596
- Time zone: UTC+3

Jarah (Arabic: جارة) is a sub-district located in the Al-Misrakh District, Taiz Governorate, Yemen. Jarah had a population of 1,596 according to the 2004 census.

== Villages ==
- Jarah village.
- Al-'Uqur village.
- Al-Kidah village.
- Al-Kasar village.
- Al-Ajraf village.
