= Ash-Sha'banyah al-Olya =

Ash-Shaʿbanyah al-ʿOlya الشعبانيه العليا
- Sub-district
- Location in Yemen
- Coordinates: 13°36′24″N 44°07′10″E
- Country: Yemen
- Governorate: Taiz Governorate
- District: At-Ta'iziyah District
- Elevation: 1,394 m (4,573 ft)

Population (2004)
  - Total: 10,673
- Time zone: UTC+3

Ash-Shaʿbanyah al-ʿOlya (Arabic: الشعبانيه العليا) is a sub-district of the At-Ta'iziyah District, in Taiz Governorate, Yemen. Ash-Shaʿbanyah al-ʿOlya had a population of 10,673 at the 2004 census.
