= Al-Aqrud =

Al-Aqrūḑ الاقروض
- Sub-district
- Location in Yemen
- Coordinates: 13°26′06″N 44°03′04″E
- Country: Yemen
- Governorate: Taiz Governorate
- District: Al-Misrakh District

Population (2004)
  - Total: 43,728
- Time zone: UTC+3

Al-Aqrūḑ (Arabic: الاقروض) is a sub-district located in the Al-Misrakh District, Taiz Governorate, Yemen. Al-Aqrūḑ had a population of 43,728 according to the 2004 census.

== Villages ==
- Aṣ-Ṣarim
- Athanib
- Dabh
- Adhagag Dabh
- Ad-Dimna
- Al-ʿAmad
- Ḥamah al-Sufla
- Ḥamah al-ʿulia
- Al-Ḥajarin
- Al-Misar
- Ḥidah
- Al-Miḥdad
- Al-Akdan
- Al-Adhur
- Al-Aridhah
- Al-Shabilah
- Mukhirʿah
- al-Wajd
- Al-Khalal
- Ḥasat
- Shamar
- Al-Najadi
- Balʿan
- Hagmah
- Al-Makhʿaf
- Al-Aslaf
- Ḥisaan
- Hibah
- Kor
- Waraqah
- Ras al-Naqil
- Al-Ḥolagah
- Al-Modamah
