= Mikhlaf Asfal =

Mikhlaf Asfal مخلاف اسفل
- Sub-district
- Location in Yemen
- Coordinates: 13°41′22″N 43°55′16″E
- Country: Yemen
- Governorate: Taiz Governorate
- District: At-Ta'iziyah District
- Elevation: 1,100 m (3,600 ft)

Population (2004)
  - Total: 16,510
- Time zone: UTC+3

Mikhlaf Asfal (Arabic: مخلاف اسفل) is a sub-district located in At-Ta'iziyah District of Taiz Governorate, Yemen. Mikhlaf Asfal had a population of 16,510 at the 2004 census.
