= Masfar =

Masfar مسفر
- Sub-district
- Location in Yemen
- Coordinates: 13°28′58″N 43°59′45″E
- Country: Yemen
- Governorate: Taiz Governorate
- District: Al-Misrakh District
- Elevation: 1,266 m (4,154 ft)

Population (2004)
  - Total: 9,168
- Time zone: UTC+3

Masfar (Arabic: مسفر) is a sub-district located in the Al-Misrakh District, Taiz Governorate, Yemen. Masfar had a population of 9,168 according to the 2004 census.

== Villages ==
- Al-Mimshah village.
- Al-Qardayn village.
- Al-Ghafira village.
- Akmat Hubish village.
