= Ar-Rubay'i =

Ar-Rubayʿi الربيعي
- Sub-district
- Location in Yemen
- Coordinates: 13°34′56″N 43°59′32″E
- Country: Yemen
- Governorate: Taiz Governorate
- District: At-Ta'iziyah District
- Elevation: 1,267 m (4,157 ft)

Population (2004)
  - Total: 11,498
- Time zone: UTC+3

Ar-Rubayʿi (Arabic: الربيعي) is a Yemeni sub-district located in the At-Ta'iziyah District, Taiz Governorate. At the 2004 census, Ar-Rubayʿi had a population of 11,498.
