= Az-Zawaqir =

Az-Zawaqir الزواقر
- Sub-district
- Location in Yemen
- Coordinates: 13°45′05″N 44°01′33″E
- Country: Yemen
- Governorate: Taiz Governorate
- District: At-Ta'iziyah District
- Elevation: 1,713 m (5,620 ft)

Population (2004)
  - Total: 8,258
- Time zone: UTC+3

Az-Zawaqir (Arabic: الزواقر) is a sub-district in At-Ta'iziyah District, of Taiz Governorate, Yemen. Az-Zawaqir had a population of 8,258 at the 2004 census.

== Climate ==
The highest average temperature in the district is in June, where it is 31°C. The coldest is January, when it is 23°C.
