= Awadir =

ʿAwadir عوادر
- Sub-district
- Location in Yemen
- Coordinates: 13°48′50″N 43°39′16″E
- Country: Yemen
- Governorate: Taiz Governorate
- District: Shar'ab ar-Rawnah District

Population (2004)
  - Total: 4,310
- Time zone: UTC+3

ʿAwadir (Arabic: عوادر) is a sub-district in the Shar'ab ar-Rawnah District, Taiz Governorate, Yemen. ʿAwadir had a population of 4,310 at the 2004 census.
