= Hilyah =

Ḥilyah حلية
- Sub-district
- Location in Yemen
- Coordinates: 13°49′20″N 43°42′10″E
- Country: Yemen
- Governorate: Taiz Governorate
- District: Shar'ab ar-Rawnah District

Population (2004)
  - Total: 4,858
- Time zone: UTC+3

Ḥilyah (Arabic: حلية) is a sub-district of the Shar'ab ar-Rawnah District, Taiz Governorate, Yemen. Ḥilyah had a population of 4,858 at the 2004 census.
