= Bani al-Nimri =

Bani al-Nimri بني النمري
- Sub-district
- Location in Yemen
- Coordinates: 15.33471°N 43.91803°E
- Country: Yemen
- Governorate: Sana'a Governorate
- District: Al Haymah Ad Dakhiliyah District

Population (2004)
  - Total: 11,951
- Time zone: UTC+3

Bani al-Nimri (Arabic: بني النمري) is a sub-district located in the Al Haymah Ad Dakhiliyah District, Sana'a Governorate, Yemen. Bani al-Nimri had a population of 11951 according to the 2004 census.
