= Az-Zarari =

Az-Zarari الزراري
- Sub-district
- Location in Yemen
- Coordinates: 13°46′49″N 43°41′16″E
- Country: Yemen
- Governorate: Taiz Governorate
- District: Shar'ab ar-Rawnah District

Population (2004)
  - Total: 5,721
- Time zone: UTC+3

Az-Zarari (Arabic: الزراري) is a sub-district of the Shar'ab ar-Rawnah District, Taiz Governorate, Yemen. Az-Zarari had a population of 5,721 at the 2004 census.
