= Al-Qusaybah =

Al-Quṣaybah القصيبة
- Sub-district
- Location in Yemen
- Coordinates: 13°39′58″N 44°01′56″E
- Country: Yemen
- Governorate: Taiz Governorate
- District: At-Ta'iziyah District
- Elevation: 1,200 m (3,900 ft)

Population (2004)
  - Total: 2,293
- Time zone: UTC+3

Al-Quṣaybah (Arabic: القصيبة) is a sub-district of At-Ta'iziyah District, Taiz Governorate, Yemen. Al-Quṣaybah had a population of 2,293 at the 2004 census.
