= Az-Zagharir =

Az-Zagharir الزغارير
- Sub-district
- Location in Yemen
- Coordinates: 13°37′41″N 43°49′58″E
- Country: Yemen
- Governorate: Taiz Governorate
- District: Shar'ab ar-Rawnah District

Population (2004)
  - Total: 6,815
- Time zone: UTC+3

Az-Zagharir (Arabic: الزغارير) is a sub-district in the Shar'ab ar-Rawnah District, Taiz Governorate, Yemen. Az-Zagharir had a population of 6,815 at the 2004 census.
