= Al-Ahtub =

Al-Aḥṭub الاحطوب
- Sub-district
- Location in Yemen
- Coordinates: 13°49′00″N 43°44′11″E
- Country: Yemen
- Governorate: Taiz Governorate
- District: Shar'ab ar-Rawnah District

Population (2004)
  - Total: 5,124
- Time zone: UTC+3

Al-Aḥṭub (Arabic: الاحطوب) is a sub-district in the Shar'ab ar-Rawnah District, Taiz Governorate, Yemen. At the 2004 census, Al-Aḥṭub had a population of 5,124.
