= Bani Husam =

Bani Husam بني حسام
- Sub-district
- Location in Yemen
- Coordinates: 13°45′23″N 43°50′00″E
- Country: Yemen
- Governorate: Taiz Governorate
- District: Shar'ab ar-Rawnah District

Population (2004)
  - Total: 4,411
- Time zone: UTC+3

Bani Husam (Arabic: بني حسام, romanized: Bani Ḥusam) is a sub-district in the Shar'ab ar-Rawnah District, Taiz Governorate, Yemen. Bani Husam had a population of 4,411 at the 2004 census.
