= Al-A'mur =

Al-Aʿmur الاعمور
- Sub-district
- Location in Yemen
- Coordinates: 13°40′02″N 44°06′19″E
- Country: Yemen
- Governorate: Taiz Governorate
- District: At-Ta'iziyah District
- Elevation: 1,427 m (4,682 ft)

Population (2004)
  - Total: 16,594
- Time zone: UTC+3

Al-Aʿmur (Arabic: الاعمور) is a Yemeni sub-district of the At-Ta'iziyah District, Taiz Governorate. Al-Aʿmur had a population of 16,594 at the 2004 census.
