= Bani 'Abbas, Taiz =

Bani ʿAbbas بني عباس
- Sub-district
- Location in Yemen
- Coordinates: 13°20′55″N 44°05′24″E
- Country: Yemen
- Governorate: Taiz Governorate
- District: Al-Mawasit District

Population (2004)
  - Total: 4,916
- Time zone: UTC+3

Bani ʿAbbas (Arabic: بني عباس) is a sub-district located in the Al-Mawasit District, Taiz Governorate, Yemen. Bani ʿAbbas had a population of 4,916 at the 2004 census.

== Villages ==
- Atab
- An-Nuwidrah
- Al-Mahjar
- Am-Mushiraḥ
- Al-Manhi
- Al-Agad al-aʿla
- Al-Agad al-Asfal
