= ALshgb, Mawiyah =

ALshgb
- Country: Yemen
- Governorate: Taiz

Population (2004)
  - Total: 1,391
- Time zone: UTC+3 (Yemen Standard Time)

ALshgb (Arabic: الشجب) is a village in the Republic of Yemen, within the Mawiyah District of the Taiz Governorate. Its population was 1,391 at the 2004 census.
