= Al-Ajshub =

Al-Ajshub الأجشوب
- Sub-district
- Location in Yemen
- Coordinates: 13°39′50″N 43°46′59″E
- Country: Yemen
- Governorate: Taiz Governorate
- District: Shar'ab ar-Rawnah District

Population (2004)
  - Total: 8,765
- Time zone: UTC+3

Al-Ajshub (Arabic: الأجشوب) is a sub-district of the Shar'ab ar-Rawnah District, Taiz Governorate, Yemen. Al-Ajshub had a population of 8,765 at the 2004 census.
