= Al-Ahbub =

Al-Ahbub الاحبوب
- Sub-district
- Location in Yemen
- Coordinates: 15°15′57″N 43°55′10″E
- Country: Yemen
- Governorate: Sana'a Governorate
- District: Al Haymah Ad Dakhiliyah District

Population (2004)
  - Total: 12,289
- Time zone: UTC+3

Al-Ahbub (Arabic: الاحبوب) is a sub-district located in the Al Haymah Ad Dakhiliyah District, Sana'a Governorate, Yemen. Al-Ahbub had a population of 12289 according to the 2004 census.
