= Qiyad =

Qiyaḍ قياض
- Sub-district
- Location in Yemen
- Coordinates: 13°45′23″N 43°59′06″E
- Country: Yemen
- Governorate: Taiz Governorate
- District: At-Ta'iziyah District
- Elevation: 1,503 m (4,931 ft)

Population (2004)
  - Total: 6,933
- Time zone: UTC+3

Qiyaḍ (Arabic: قياض) is a sub-district in the At-Ta'iziyah District, of Taiz Governorate, Yemen. Qiyaḍ had a population of 6,933 at the 2004 census.
