= Nisf al-Ozal =

Nisf Al-Ozal نصف العزل
- Sub-district
- Location in Yemen
- Coordinates: 13°44′06″N 43°50′41″E
- Country: Yemen
- Governorate: Taiz Governorate
- District: Shar'ab ar-Rawnah District

Population (2004)
  - Total: 2,410
- Time zone: UTC+3

Nisf Al-Ozal (Arabic: نصف العزل) is a sub-district in the Shar'ab ar-Rawnah District, Taiz Governorate, Yemen. Nisf Al-Ozal had a population of 2,410 at the 2004 census.
