= Bani al-Sayagh =

Bani al-Sayagh بني السياغ
- Sub-district
- Location in Yemen
- Coordinates: 15.22943°N 43.93529°E
- Country: Yemen
- Governorate: Sana'a Governorate
- District: Al Haymah Ad Dakhiliyah District

Population (2004)
  - Total: 8,809
- Time zone: UTC+3

Bani al-Sayagh (Arabic: بني السياغ) is a sub-district located in the Al Haymah Ad Dakhiliyah District, Sana'a Governorate, Yemen. Bani al-Sayagh had a population of 8809 according to the 2004 census.
