= Qadas (Taiz) =

Qadas قدس
- Sub-district
- Location in Yemen
- Coordinates: 13°16′56″N 44°09′19″E
- Country: Yemen
- Governorate: Taiz Governorate
- District: Al-Mawasit District

Population (2004)
  - Total: 42,976
- Time zone: UTC+3

Qadas (Arabic: قدس) is a sub-district in the Al-Mawasit District, Taiz Governorate, Yemen. Qadas had a population of 42,976 at the 2004 census.

== Villages ==
- Al-Qatin
- Al-Maghdar
- Al-Aqrud
- Al-Swirah
- Radaa
- Bani Khurasan Kafana
- Bani Salah
- Bani Mustafa
- Wadi al-'Ajab
- Hulqan
- Al-zkhv
- Asidah
- Dha Al-jamal
- al-Qaheva
- Eshrouh Bani Ali
- Akarod Asfal
- Al-Sadah Wa al-Dai'sah
- al-Batnh
- Al-Diya'
- Al-Hajar
- Al-Jahili
- Al-Damanah
- Bani Hiba
- Al-Rad'a
- Bani Saeed
- Al-Mamerh
- Gohan
- Amqan
- Al-Dhaf
- Al-Ahsun
- Al-Dakhl
- Al-Nebahnh
- Bani Mansur
- Al-Makisha
- Al-Hanahan
- Al-Jund
- khusila
- Bani Saleh
- Bani Saadan
- Krefah
- Al-Tayy
- Al-Asserah
- Al-Majina
- Al-Mfalha
- Al-Sadah
- Al-Ahjum
