= Hasban A'la =

Ḩaşbān A'la حصبان اعلى
- Sub-district
- Location in Yemen
- Coordinates: 13°29′23″N 44°02′08″E
- Country: Yemen
- Governorate: Taiz Governorate
- District: Al-Misrakh District

Population (2004)
  - Total: 5,026
- Time zone: UTC+3

Ḩaşbān A'la (Arabic: حصبان اعلى) is a sub-district located in the Al-Misrakh District, Taiz Governorate, Yemen. Ḩaşbān A'la had a population of 5,026 according to the 2004 census.

== Villages ==
- Bayiys village.
- Al-Sina' village.
- Al-Jarinuh village.
- Al-Nabirah Al'ulya village.
- Al-Hanna village.
- Al-'Ashiyn village.
- Al-'Adan village.
- Mashra'ah village.
- Al-nabirah Al-suflaa village.
