= Jazirat Ziadi =

Island in the Republic of Yemen

- Location within Yemen

Geography
- Location: Red Sea
- Coordinates: 13°18′15″N 43°13′56.01″E

Administration
- Yemen

Jazirat Ziadi (Arabic: جزيرة الزيادي, romanized: Jazīrat Ziyādī) is a Yemeni island in the Red Sea. It is considered an 'Uzlah (sub-district) of Al-Makha District, Taiz Governorate.

== See also ==
- Perim
