= Bani al-Hudhyfi =

Bani al-Hudhyfi بني الحذيفي
- Sub-district
- Location in Yemen
- Coordinates: 15°16′18″N 43°45′59″E
- Country: Yemen
- Governorate: Sana'a Governorate
- District: Al Haymah Ad Dakhiliyah District

Population (2004)
  - Total: 8,248
- Time zone: UTC+3

Bani al-Hudhyfi (Arabic: بني الحذيفي) is a sub-district located in the Al Haymah Ad Dakhiliyah District, Sana'a Governorate, Yemen. Bani al-Hudhyfi had a population of 8248 according to the 2004 census.
