= Al-Gharbi =

Al-Gharbi الغربي
- Sub-district
- Location in Yemen
- Coordinates: 13°44′38″N 43°46′28″E
- Country: Yemen
- Governorate: Taiz Governorate
- District: Shar'ab ar-Rawnah District

Population (2004)
  - Total: 9,408
- Time zone: UTC+3

Al-Gharbi (Arabic: الغربي) is a sub-district in the Shar'ab ar-Rawnah District, Taiz Governorate, Yemen. Al-Gharbi had a population of 9,408 at the 2004 census. ´

== See also ==
- Gharb al-Andalus
