= Al-Ashraf (Taiz) =

Al-Ashraf الاشراف
- Sub-district
- Location in Yemen
- Coordinates: 13°45′10″N 43°48′48″E
- Country: Yemen
- Governorate: Taiz Governorate
- District: Shar'ab ar-Rawnah District

Population (2004)
  - Total: 7,921
- Time zone: UTC+3

Al-Ashraf (Arabic: الاشراف) is a sub-district in the Shar'ab ar-Rawnah District, Taiz Governorate, Yemen. Al-Ashraf had a population of 7,921 at the 2004 census.
