= Abdan, Taiz =

Abdan عبدان
- Sub-district
- Location in Yemen
- Coordinates: 13°30′47″N 44°05′29″E
- Country: Yemen
- Governorate: Taiz Governorate
- District: Al-Misrakh District
- Elevation: 1,616 m (5,302 ft)

Population (2004)
  - Total: 9,168
- Time zone: UTC+3

Abdan (Arabic: عبدان) is a sub-district located in the Al-Misrakh District, Taiz Governorate, Yemen. Abdan had a population of 9,168 according to the 2004 census.

== Villages ==
- Al-Jirat.
- Al-Mihal.
- Al-Zawh.
- Al-Mawasatuh.
- Al-Awrmh.
