= Al-Janadyah al-Olya =

Al-Janadyah al-ʿOlya عزلة الجنديه العليا
- Sub-district
- Location in Yemen
- Coordinates: 13°42′45″N 44°08′11″E
- Country: Yemen
- Governorate: Taiz Governorate
- District: At-Ta'iziyah District
- Elevation: 1,499 m (4,918 ft)

Population (2004)
  - Total: 27,929
- Time zone: UTC+3

Al-Janadyah al-ʿOlya (Arabic: عزلة الجنديه العليا) is a Yemeni sub-district in the At-Ta'iziyah District, Taiz Governorate. Al-Janadyah al-ʿOlya had a population of 27,929 at the 2004 census.
