= Al-Hasyah =

Al-Hasyah الحسية
- Sub-district
- Location in Yemen
- Coordinates: 13°46′56″N 43°47′38″E
- Country: Yemen
- Governorate: Taiz Governorate
- District: Shar'ab ar-Rawnah District

Population (2004)
  - Total: 3,498
- Time zone: UTC+3

Al-Hasyah (Arabic: الحسية, romanized: al-Ḥasyah) is a sub-district located in the Shar'ab ar-Rawnah District, Taiz Governorate, Yemen. Al-Hasyah had a population of 3,498 at the 2004 census.
