= Bani Murir =

Bani Murir بني مرير
- Sub-district
- Location in Yemen
- Coordinates: 13°46′50″N 43°48′59″E
- Country: Yemen
- Governorate: Taiz Governorate
- District: Shar'ab ar-Rawnah District

Population (2004)
  - Total: 4,888
- Time zone: UTC+3

Bani Murir (Arabic: بني مرير) is a sub-district located in the Shar'ab ar-Rawnah District, Taiz Governorate, Yemen. Bani Murir had a population of 4,888 at the 2004 census.
