= Al-Mawasit district =

Coordinates: 13.3042°N 44.1003°E

Al-Mawasit District مديرية المواسط
- District
- Interactive map of Al-Mawasit District
- Country: Yemen
- Governorate: Taiz

Area
  - Total: 216.8 km^{2} (83.7 sq mi)

Population (2003)
  - Total: 115,857
- Time zone: UTC+3 (Yemen Standard Time)

Al-Mawasit District (Arabic: مديرية المواسط) is a district of the Taiz Governorate, Yemen. As of 2003, the district had a population of 115,857 inhabitants.

== Location ==
A map shows districts of Taiz

It is located in the southern part of Taiz governorate. It is bordered by Same'a and part of Al-Ma'afar to the north, Ash-Shamayatayn to the south, As Silw to the east and Ma'afar to the west.

== Uzaal and villages of Al-Mawasit ==
Rural districts in Yemen are divided into 'Uzaal which are further divided into villages. There are eighteen Uzaal in Al-Mawasit.

- Akhmur
- Al A'lum
- Al Ayfu'
- Bani Abas
- Bani Hamad
- Bani Yusuf
- Qadas
