= Hayfan district =

Coordinates: 13.2906°N 44.2606°E

Hayfan District مديرية حيفان
- District
- Interactive map of Hayfan District
- Country: Yemen
- Governorate: Taiz

Population (2003)
  - Total: 171,315
- Time zone: UTC+3 (Yemen Standard Time)

Hayfan District (Arabic: مديرية حيفان) is a district of the Taiz Governorate, Yemen. As of 2003, the district had a population of 171,315 inhabitants.
