= Al-khalal, Mawiyah =

Al-khalal الخلل
- Country: Yemen
- Governorate: Taiz

Population (2004)
  - Total: 665
- Time zone: UTC+3 (Yemen Standard Time)

Al-khalal (Arabic: الخلل) is a village located in the Taiz Governorate, Yemen, and falls under the administrative jurisdiction of Mawiyah District. According to 2004 statistics, the village has a population of 665 people.
