= Bani Yousef (Taiz) =

Bani Yousef بني يوسف
- Sub-district
- Location in Yemen
- Coordinates: 13°20′02″N 44°07′29″E
- Country: Yemen
- Governorate: Taiz Governorate
- District: Al-Mawasit District

Population (2004)
  - Total: 22,013
- Time zone: UTC+3

Bani Yousef (Arabic: بني يوسف) is a sub-district in the Al-Mawasit District, Taiz Governorate, Yemen. Bani Yousef had a population of 22,013 at the 2004 census.

== Villages ==
- Al-Ayn
- Khonazir
- Al-Maqsos
- Mashrfah
- Al-Akamah
- Qdhaʿ
- Brdad
- Al-Yabon
- Khrʿasah
- ʿAqaf
- Sharar
- Garnat
- Hsmah
- Ad-Dom
- Al-Adiraʿ
- Dhabʿa
- Al-Qihaf
- Al-Thanib
- Al-Manakh
- Hujrah
- Makhafin
- Alsalab
- Iqah
- Sharaf Alddom
- Hunaidah
