= Bani Yousef (Sanaa) =

Bani Yousef بني يوسف
- Sub-district
- Location in Yemen
- Coordinates: 15°13′09″N 43°47′44″E
- Country: Yemen
- Governorate: Sana'a Governorate
- District: Al Haymah Ad Dakhiliyah District

Population (2004)
  - Total: 6,743
- Time zone: UTC+3

Bani Yousef (Arabic: بني يوسف) is a sub-district located in the Al Haymah Ad Dakhiliyah District, Sana'a Governorate, Yemen. Bani Yousef had a population of 6743 according to the 2004 census.
