= Shar'ab ar-Rawnah district =

Coordinates: 13.7333°N 43.7669°E

Shara'b Ar Rawnah District شرعب الرونة
- District
- Interactive map of Shara'b Ar Rawnah District
- Country: Yemen
- Governorate: Taiz
- Seat: Ar Rawnah town

Population (2003)
  - Total: 186,955
- Time zone: UTC+3 (Yemen Standard Time)

Shara'b Ar Rawnah District (Arabic: مديرية شرعب الرونة) is a district of the Taiz Governorate, Yemen. As of 2003, the district had a population of 186,955 inhabitants.

== Etymology ==
Shara'b Ar Rawnah is part of the Shara'b Mikhlaf that includes both Shara'b As Salam and Shara'b Ar Rawnah. The Mikhlaf was founded by the tribe of Banu Shar'ab, which is a tribe from Himyar. According to al-Hamdani and Nashwan al-Himyari, it is descended from Shar'ab Ibn Sahl Ibn Zaid Ibn 'Amru Ibn Qais Ibn Jusham Ibn Abd Shams Ibn Wail Ibn al-Ghwth Ibn Qotn Ibn 'Aurib Ibn Zuhir Ibn Aiman Ibn Homisa' Ibn Himyar. Ibn al-Kalbi and Ibn Khaldun say Shar'ab Ibn Qais without "Sahl Ibn Zaid Ibn ‘Amru". According to Ibn Sidah the word Sharoob (Arabic: شرعوب) means dates in classical Arabic and Shar'ab means a tall person with a well shaped body. The Sharabi spears (Arabic: الرماح الشرعبية) and an outer cloak called al-Shar'abiah (Arabic: الشرعبية) are attributed to the tribe of Shara'b.

== Sub-districts ==
- Al-Ahtub
- Al-Asad
- Al-Ashjub
- Al-Ashraf
- Al-Gharbi
- Al-Hasyah
- Al-Hayajim
- Al-Malawhah
- Ar-Ra'inah
- Awadir
- Az-Zagharir
- Az-Zarari
- Bani Husam
- Bani Murir
- Bani Sari
- Bani Sumi'
- Bani Ziad
- Hilyah
- Murkhah
- Nisf al-Ozal
- Sharqi Himyar
