= 'Arsh =

ʿArsh عرش
- Sub-district
- Location in Yemen
- Coordinates: 13°27′59″N 44°01′32″E
- Country: Yemen
- Governorate: Taiz Governorate
- District: Al-Misrakh District
- Elevation: 1,455 m (4,774 ft)

Population (2004)
  - Total: 9,569
- Time zone: UTC+3

ʿArsh (Arabic: عرش) is a sub-district located in the Al-Misrakh District, Taiz Governorate, Yemen. ʿArsh had a population of 9,569 according to the 2004 census.
