= Jabal Sabir =

Mountain in Yemen

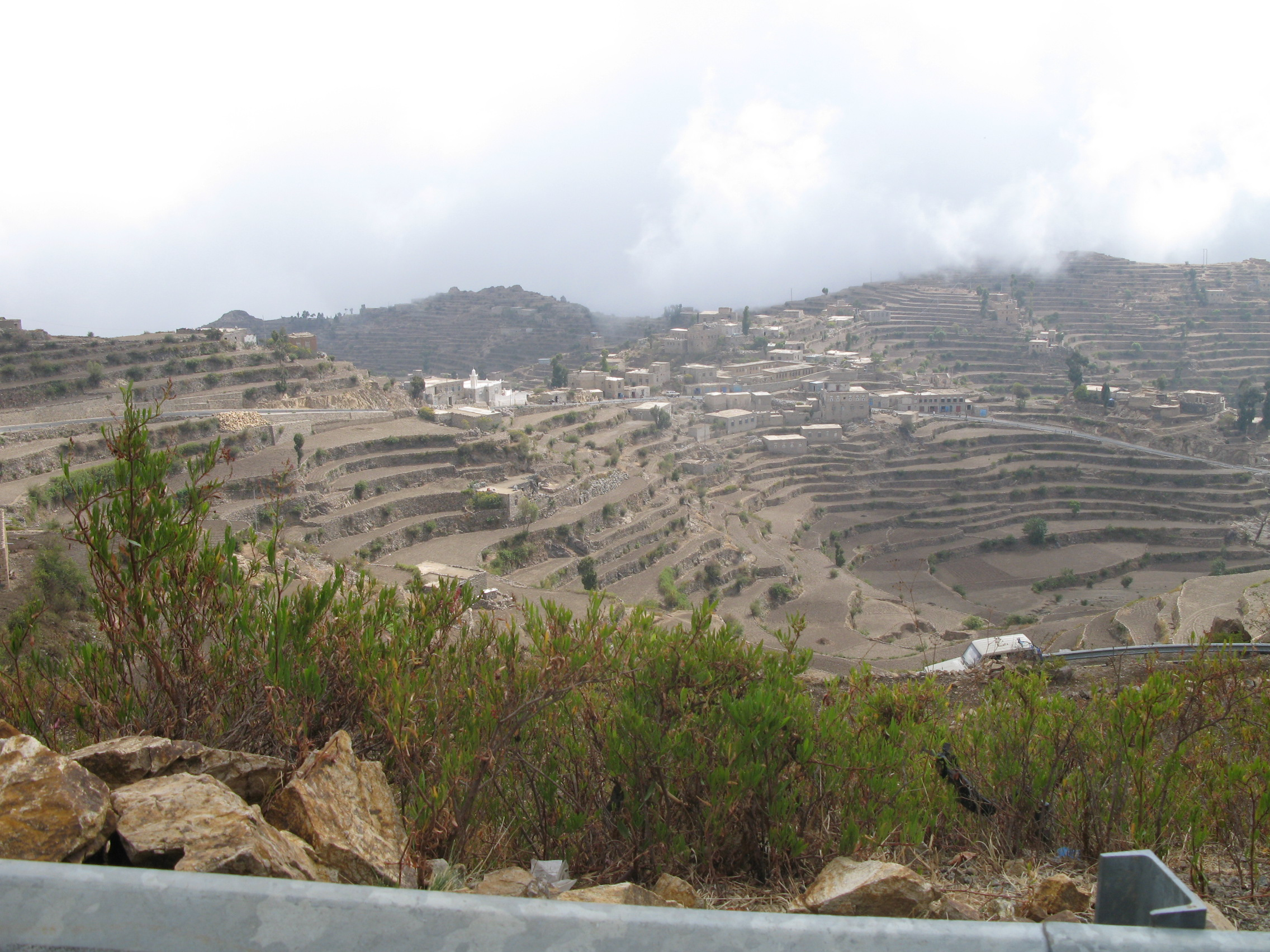

Highest point
- Elevation: 3,006 m (9,862 ft)
- Prominence: 1,586 m (5,203 ft)
- Listing: Ribu
- Coordinates: 13°30′54″N 044°03′06.12″E

Naming
- Native name: جَبَل صَبَر (in Arabic)

Geography
- Location within Yemen
- Location: Taiz Governorate, Yemen

Jabal Sabir (Arabic: جَبَل صَبَر, romanized: Jabal Ṣabar), also spelled Jabal Saber, is a mountain located in the southern part of Taiz Governorate, Yemen, near the city of Taiz. At more than 3,000 meters, it is one of the highest mountains in Yemen.

== See also ==
- List of ultras of West Asia
