= Bani Yousef (Ibb) =

Bani Yousef بني يوسف
- Sub-district
- Location in Yemen
- Coordinates: 13°56′42″N 43°51′01″E
- Country: Yemen
- Governorate: Ibb Governorate
- District: Far Al Udayn District

Population (2004)
  - Total: 6,604
- Time zone: UTC+3

Bani Yousef (Arabic: بني يوسف) is a sub-district located in Far Al Udayn District, Ibb Governorate, Yemen. Bani Yousef had a population of 6604 according to the 2004 census.
