= Mawiya, Yemen =

Coordinates: 13.5844°N 44.3189°E

Mawiyah District مديرية ماوية
- District
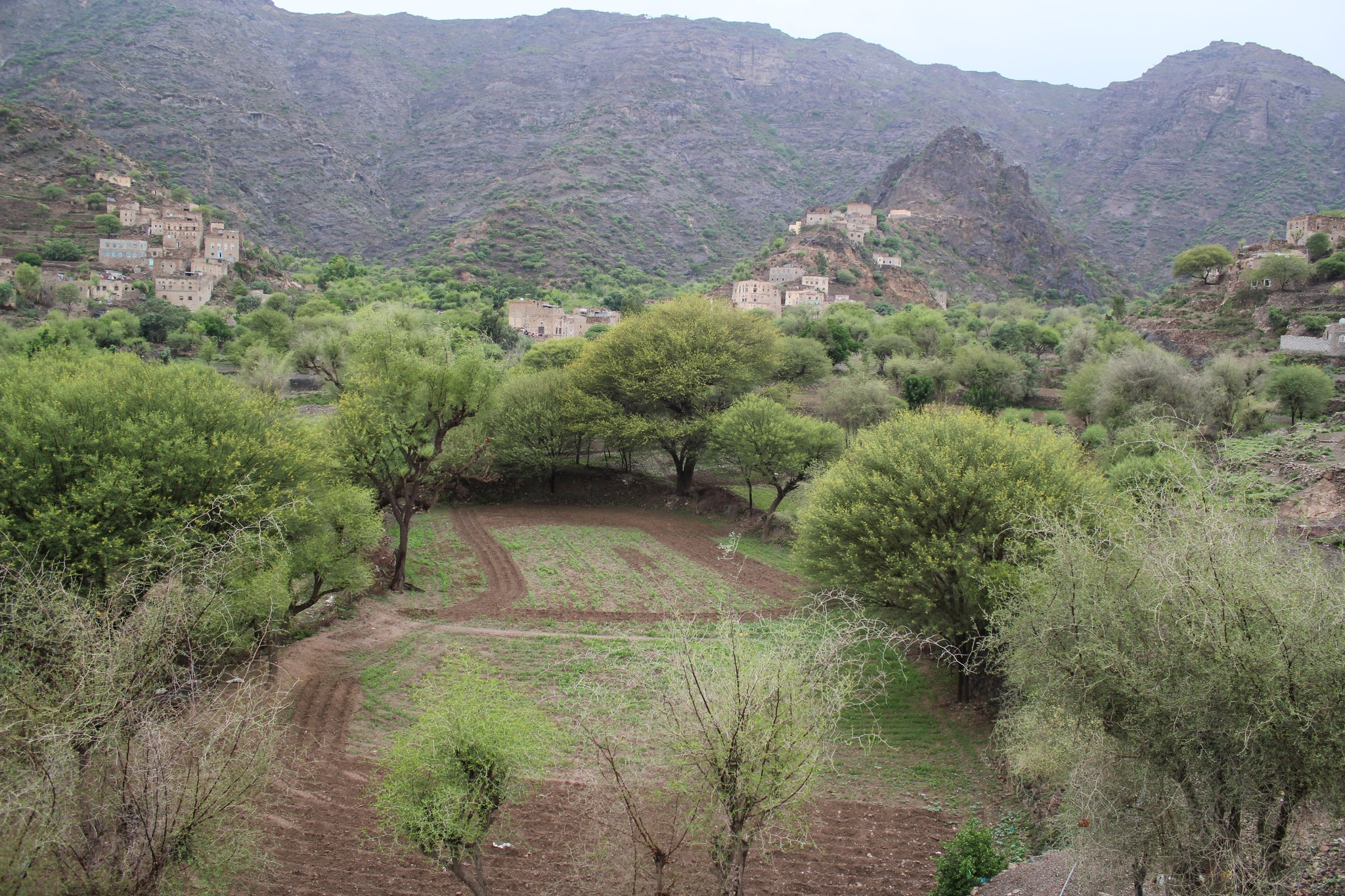
- Wadi Hmyarim in Mawiyah
- Interactive map of Mawiyah District
- Country: Yemen
- Governorate: Taiz

Population (2003)
  - Total: 129,765
- Time zone: UTC+3 (Yemen Standard Time)

Mawiyah District (Arabic: مديرية ماوية) is a district of the Taiz Governorate, Yemen. In 2003, the district had a population of 129,765. In 2021, the population was estimated at 190,898.

== Villages in Mawiyah District ==
- Alrkph
- Al-khalal
- Almaan
- ALshgb
