= Mashra'a Wa Hadnan district =

Coordinates: 13.5417°N 43.9981°E

Mashra'a Wa Hadnan District مديرية مشرعة وحدنان
- District
- Interactive map of Mashra'a Wa Hadnan District
- Country: Yemen
- Governorate: Taiz

Population (2003)
  - Total: 109,533
- Time zone: UTC+3 (Yemen Standard Time)

Mashra'a Wa Hadnan District is a district of the Taiz Governorate, Yemen. As of 2003, the district had a population of 109,533 inhabitants.
