= At-Ta'iziyah district =

Coordinates: 13.6947°N 44.0092°E

At Ta'iziyah District مديرية التعزية
- District
- Interactive map of At Ta'iziyah District
- Country: Yemen
- Governorate: Taiz

Population (2003)
  - Total: 109,814
- Time zone: UTC+3 (Yemen Standard Time)

At Ta'iziyah District (Arabic: مديرية التعزية) is a district of the Taiz Governorate, Yemen. As of 2003, the district had a population of 109,814 inhabitants.

== Sub-districts ==
- Ad-Da'aysah
- Al-A'mur
- Al-Aj'ud
- Al-Esrar
- Al-Hashamah
- Al-Haymah al-Olya
- Al-Haymah as-Sufla
- Al-Ja'di
- Al-Janadyah al-Olya
- Al-Janadyah as-Sufla
- Al-Masnah
- Al-Qusaybah
- Ar-Rubay'i
- Ash-Sha'banyah al-Olya
- Ash-Sha'banyah as-Sufla
- Ash-Shuhnah
- Az-Zawaqir
- Hadhran
- Mikhlaf Asfal
- Qiyad
