= Dhubab district =

Coordinates: 12.9658°N 43.4722°E

Dhubab district Bab al-Mandab district
- District
- Interactive map of Dhubab district
- Country: Yemen
- Governorate: Taiz
- Capital: Dhubab

Population (2003)
  - Total: 35,054
- Time zone: UTC+3 (Yemen Standard Time)

Dhubab district, also known as Bab al-Mandab district (Arabic: مديرية ذباب), is a district of the Taiz Governorate, Yemen. As of 2003, the district had a population of 35,054 inhabitants. The principal town is Dhubab.
