= Salh district =

Coordinates: 13.5839°N 44.0400°E

Salh District صالة
- District
- Interactive map of Salh District
- Country: Yemen
- Governorate: Taiz Governorate

Population (2003)
  - Total: 198,169
- Time zone: UTC+3 (Yemen Standard Time)

Salh District (Arabic: مديرية صالة) is a district of the Taiz Governorate, Yemen. As of 2003, the district had a population of 198,169 people.
