= Mohsen Ayed =

Yemeni writer, activist and journalist

Mohsen Ayed Tahish HAWBAN
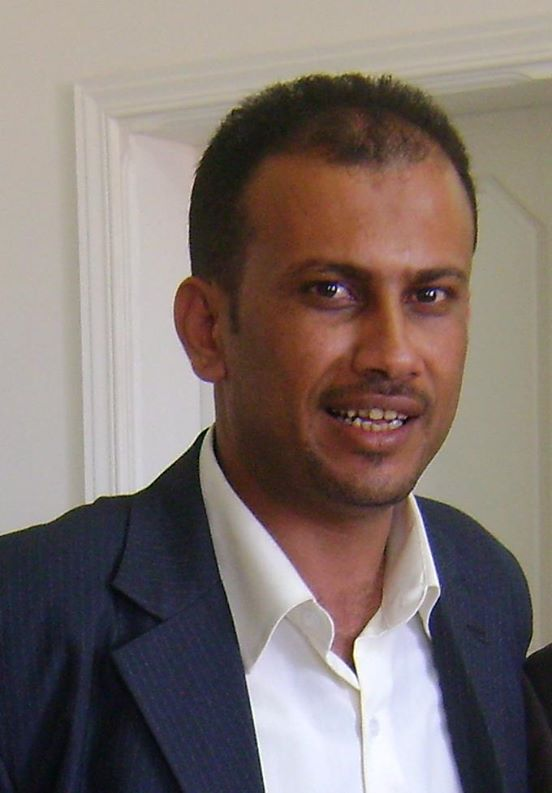
- Ayed in 2014
- Born: 29 July 1976 (age 49); Yemen, Ta'izz Governorate
- Office: Journalist

Mohsen Ayed Hammoud Sultan, known as Tahish HAWBAN (Arabic: محسن عايض) is a Yemeni author, journalist, and human rights activist. He was born in 1976 in the village of Tbahah, located in the Ta'izz Governorate, Yemen.

== Education ==
He holds a Bachelor of Agriculture from the University of Sanaa and a Computer Diploma from the Institute of Teacher Education. Additionally, he has earned diplomas in civil society, business administration, applied software, accounting, and marketing and the art of sales. He has also completed various courses in civil society, media, democratic transformation, remote training, and open education.

== Career ==
He previously served as the executive director of the Institute for the Development of Yemeni Democracy and the executive director of the Future Movement. He is currently the editor of the Tahish Hawban newspaper and conducts training programs for the qualitative sector under the Ministry of Education's training and rehabilitation initiatives.

== Life ==
Journalist Mohsen Ayed is considered one of the most controversial journalists in Yemen due to his views on political and religious issues, particularly his criticism of the veil and traditional customs in Yemeni society. Ayed publicly declared his opposition to these customs and traditions by sharing a photograph with his wife in an intimate pose, where she was not wearing the Islamic veil. This act sparked outrage among many clerics and Islamist hardliners in Yemen.

== Takfir fatwas ==
In February 2012, 69 clerics in Yemen issued a fatwa accusing journalist Mohsen Ayed of blasphemy, claiming that he had insulted Islam and the divine. These fatwas contributed to the separation between him and his wife and children. Following the fatwa, his wife sought khula (a form of divorce in Islamic law), citing his alleged abandonment of the Islamic faith as grounds for the separation. The fatwas also placed Ayed's life in danger. Despite the crisis, Ayed responded with composure and revealed that five Yemeni women had expressed their desire to marry him in solidarity during his time of hardship.

== Novels ==
He has written a novel titled Victims.
