= Al-Mudhaffar district =

Coordinates: 13.5831°N 43.9925°E

Al Mudhaffar District
- District
- Interactive map of Al Mudhaffar District
- Country: Yemen
- Governorate: Taiz

Population (2003)
  - Total: 146,259
- Time zone: UTC+3 (Yemen Standard Time)

Al Mudhaffar District is a district of the Taiz Governorate, Yemen. As of 2003, the district had a population of 146,259 inhabitants.
