= Ayed (singer) =

Saudi Arabian singer (born 1996)

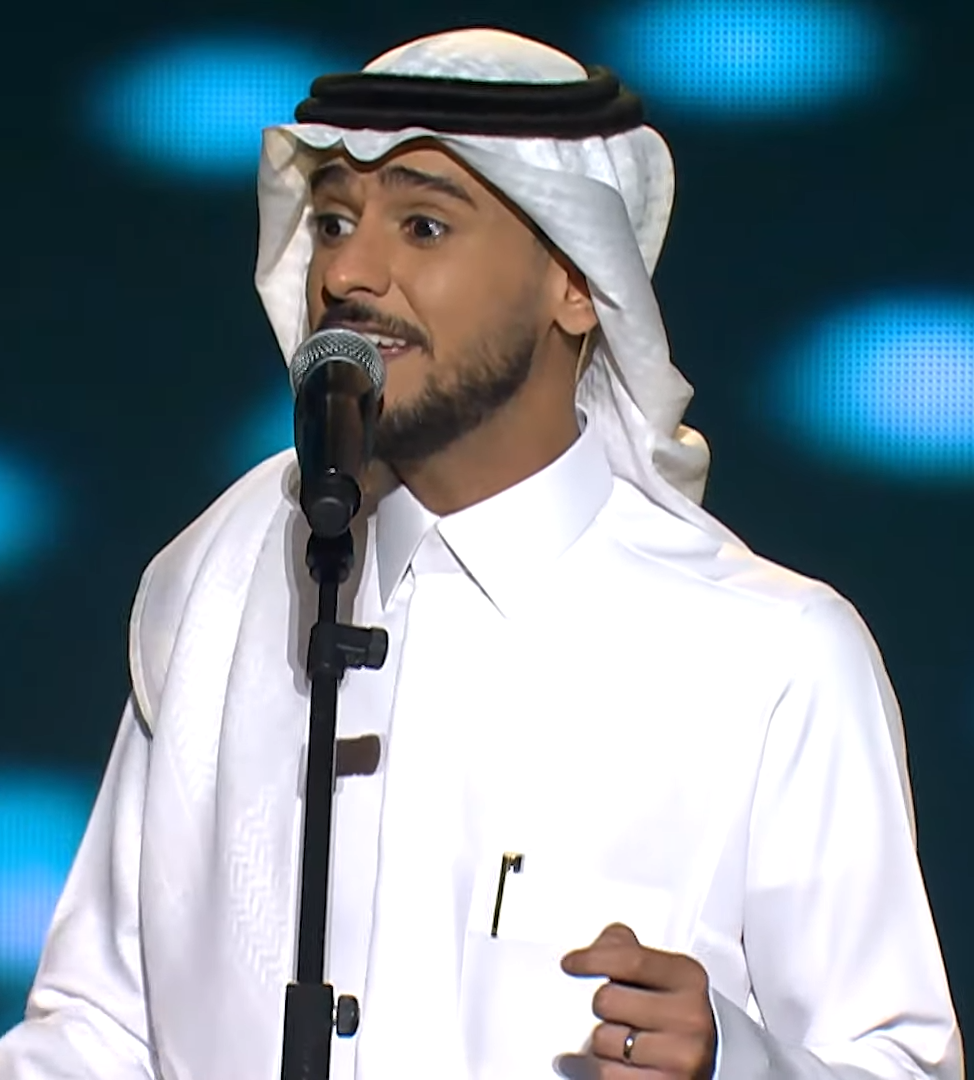
- Ayed performing during Riyadh Season in October 2024

Background information
- Born: Ayed Yousef Alqarni; 11 May 1996 (age 30); Riyadh, Saudi Arabia
- Genres: Arabic pop
- Occupation: Singer
- Instrument: Vocals
- Years active: 2015–present
- Labels: Luxury KSA; Sony Music Entertainment Middle East

Ayed Yousef Alqarni (Arabic: عايض يوسف القرني; born 11 May 1996), known mononymously as Ayed (Arabic: عايض), is a Saudi singer.

== Career ==
Ayed achieved his first top-five entry on the International Federation of the Phonographic Industry's The Official MENA Chart with "Tjyny," from his second studio album Kl ālkhṭā (2022).

In October 2023, "Kārah nafsī" achieved Ayed's best Middle Eastern chart position (#2), as well as his first number one in Saudi Arabia. His "Rdy" (2023) debuted directly at the top of the Middle Eastern and Saudi charts. "Ahlan wsʻdan" (2023) and "ʻĀlam al-ʻushshāq" (2024), duets with Humood AlKhudher and Khalid Muthafar, also replicated the success of their previous songs, finishing at the top of the Saudi charts.

Ayed then released his summer hit Lmāḥ (2024), which topped the Official MENA Chart and the national chart; it maintained the top spot on both charts for at least three consecutive months. He was nominated for three awards at the Billboard Arabia Music Awards, and at the ceremony, he took home the award for Best Khaliji Song with Lmāḥ.

Ayed's third album of new material, entitled Āyiḍ 2025, was released in April 2025. Four of the album's seven tracks appeared in the national top ten simultaneously.

== Discography ==
=== Studio albums ===
- 2018 – Thmān ālām
- 2022 – Kl ālkhṭā
- 2025 – ʻĀyiḍ 2025

=== Extended plays ===
- 2016 – ʻĀyiḍ 2016
- 2018 – Bi-al-mawt jā

=== Singles ===
- 2015 – Nsytny
- 2015 – Sāqy ālʻṭsh
- 2016 – Qlyl-ālshwf
- 2016 – Mūdī khwsh
- 2016 – Ḍāʻat ayyāmī (with Jassem Mohammed)
- 2016 – Mā ʻalá
- 2017 – Wyny anā
- 2017 – Ghaṣb ʻuniya
- 2017 – ʻAjz ṣabrī
- 2017 – Tlkhbṭ
- 2017 – ʻInān al-samā
- 2018 – Anā wlht
- 2018 – Qdhā
- 2019 – Lā tbāly
- 2019 – Dwk qalbī
- 2019 – Yālrbʻ
- 2019 – Wa-allāh mā yrmsh
- 2019 – Li-mādhā
- 2019 – Bi-lā adny sabab
- 2020 – Fwwḍt anā
- 2020 – Fī dhākirat al-ẓill
- 2020 – ʻAdl Rabī
- 2020 – Yā hyh
- 2020 – Tastāhilīn akthar
- 2020 – Ghṭrfy yānjd
- 2020 – Al-amānī
- 2020 – Ḥulw al-kalām
- 2021 – Bṣd
- 2021 – Yā Muḥammad (with Nayef Al-Nayef)
- 2021 – Lāḥwl wlāqwh
- 2022 – Tabāraka qalbī
- 2022 – Tdryn
- 2022 – Frqty
- 2022 – Saʻūdīyūn
- 2022 – Allāh maʻak yā akhḍar
- 2023 – Ilá Allāh
- 2023 – Shāʼa Rabī (with Fahd Al-Salem)
- 2023 – Ahlan wsʻdan (with Humood AlKhudher)
- 2023 – Narjiʻ nltqy
- 2023 – Tjyny rymks
- 2023 – Kārah nafsī
- 2023 – Rdy
- 2024 – ʻĀlam al-ʻushshāq (with Khalid Muthafar)
- 2024 – Lmāḥ
- 2024 – Māhdā bālī
- 2025 – Ajrḥ min al-būm ʻĀyiḍ
- 2025 – Ḥbby laka wa ḥub al-Kuwayt
