= Sabir al-Mawadim district =

Coordinates: 13.5317°N 44.0461°E

Sabir Al Mawadim District صبر الموادم
- District
- Interactive map of Sabir Al Mawadim District
- Country: Yemen
- Governorate: Taiz

Population (2003)
  - Total: 100,254
- Time zone: UTC+3 (Yemen Standard Time)

Sabir Al Mawadim District (Arabic: صبر الموادم) is a district of the Taiz Governorate, Yemen. As of 2003, the district had a population of 100,254 inhabitants.
