= Dimnat Khadir district =

Coordinates: 13.4383°N 44.2542°E

Dimnat Khadir District مديرية دمنت خدير
- District
- Interactive map of Dimnat Khadir District
- Country: Yemen
- Governorate: Taiz

Population (2003)
  - Total: 49,832
- Time zone: UTC+3 (Yemen Standard Time)

Dimnat Khadir District (Arabic: مديرية دمنت خدير) is a district of the Taiz Governorate, Yemen. As of 2003, the district had a population of 49,832 inhabitants.
