= Ash-Shamayatayn district =

Coordinates: 13.1819°N 43.9797°E

Ash Shamayatayn District مديرية الشمايتين
- District
- Interactive map of Ash Shamayatayn District
- Country: Yemen
- Governorate: Taiz

Population (2003)
  - Total: 26,790
- Time zone: UTC+3 (Yemen Standard Time)

Ash Shamayatayn District (Arabic: مديرية الشمايتين) is a district of the Taiz Governorate, Yemen. As of 2003, the district had a population of 26,790 inhabitants.
