= Al-Makha district =

Coordinates: 13.5197°N 43.4278°E

Al-Makha district مديرية المخا
- District
- Interactive map of Al-Makha district
- Country: Yemen
- Governorate: Taiz

Area
  - Total: 1,568.5 km^{2} (605.6 sq mi)

Population (2003)
  - Total: 18,155
- Time zone: UTC+3 (Yemen Standard Time)

Al-Makha district (Arabic: مديرية المخا) is a district of the Taiz Governorate, Yemen. As of 2003, the district had a population of 18,155 inhabitants. The capital lies at Mokha.

== Location ==
It is located in north-west of Taiz governorate. It is bordered by Maqbanah and Al Khawkhah to the north, Al-Mandab to the south, Mawza and Maqbanah to the east, the Red Sea to the west.
