= As-Silw district =

Coordinates: 13.3458°N 44.2069°E

As Silw District
- District
- Interactive map of As Silw District
- Country: Yemen
- Governorate: Taiz

Population (2003)
  - Total: 152,486
- Time zone: UTC+3 (Yemen Standard Time)

As Silw District is a district of the Taiz Governorate, Yemen. As of 2003, the district had a population of 152,486 inhabitants.
