= Maqbanah district =

Coordinates: 13.6211°N 43.6672°E

Maqbanah District
- District
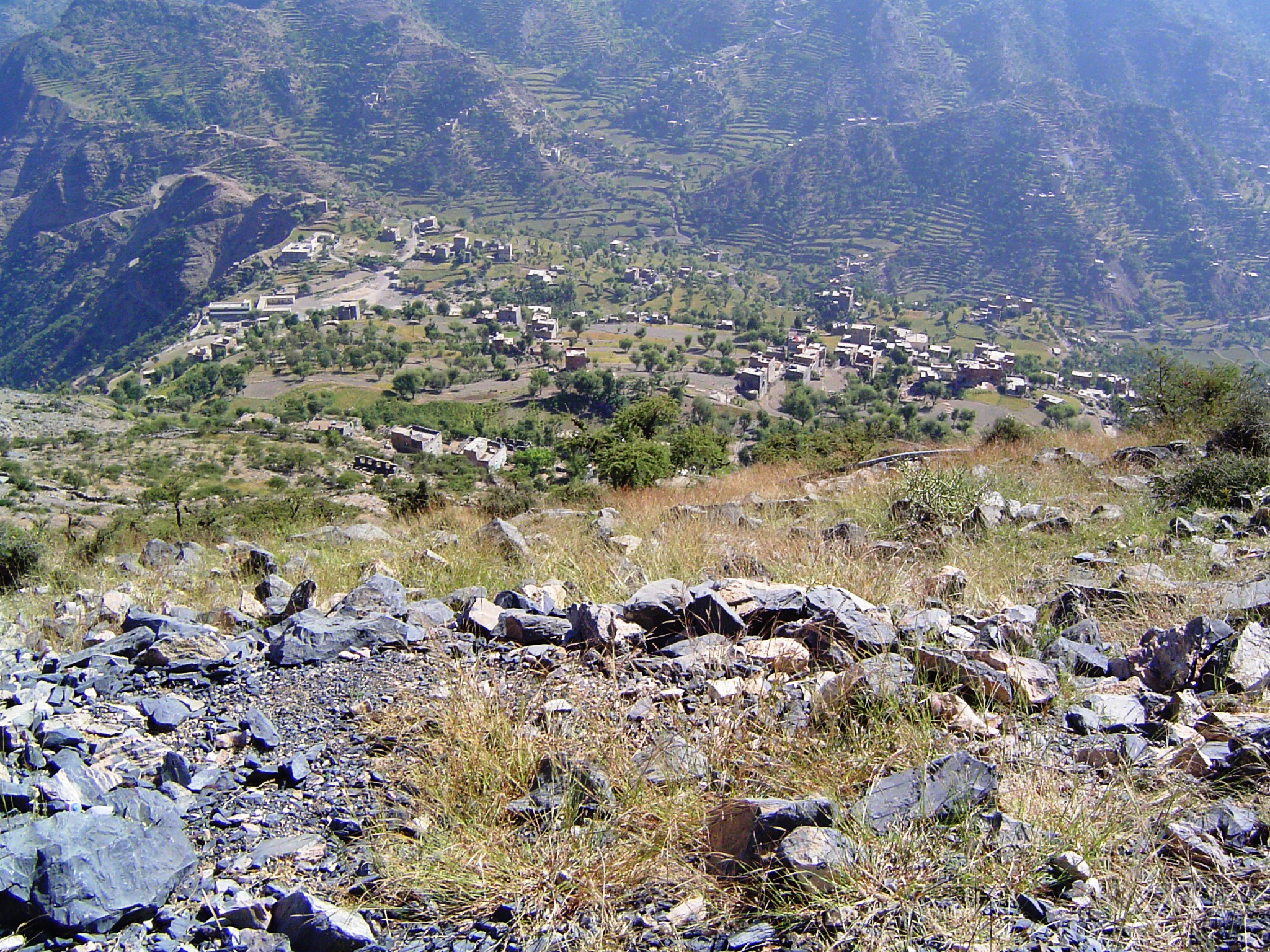
- Jabal Mīrāb in Maqbanah
- Interactive map of Maqbanah District
- Country: Yemen
- Governorate: Taiz

Population (2003)
  - Total: 62,471
- Time zone: UTC+3 (Yemen Standard Time)

Maqbanah District (Arabic: مديرية مقبنة) is a district of the Taiz Governorate, Yemen. As of 2003, the district has a population of 62,471 inhabitants. The district is divided into three Makhalief: Mikhlaf Shamir, Mikhlaf Mirab and Mikhlaf al-Tharibat.
