= Al-Maafer district =

Coordinates: 13.3742°N 43.9261°E

Al-Maafer district مديرية المعافر
- District
- Interactive map of Al-Maafer district
- Country: Yemen
- Governorate: Taiz

Area
  - Total: 350.4 km^{2} (135.3 sq mi)

Population (2003)
  - Total: 110,924
- Time zone: UTC+3 (Yemen Standard Time)

Al Maafer District (Arabic: مديرية المعافر) is a district of the Taiz Governorate, Yemen. As of 2003, the district had a population of 110,924 inhabitants.

== Location ==
It is located in the southern part of Taiz governorate. it is bordered by Al-Misrakh to the north, Ash Shamayatayn to the south, Same'a and Al-Mawasit to the east and Jabal Habashy to the west.

== Notable residents ==
- Iftihan al-Mashhari, head of Taiz's sanitation department.
