= Al Haymah Ad Dakhiliyah district =

- District
- Location within Yemen
- Coordinates: 15°10′0″N 43°50′0″E
- Country: Yemen
- Governorate: Sana'a

Area
  - Total: 463 km^{2} (179 sq mi)

Population (2003)
  - Total: 83,234
  - Density: 180/km^{2} (466/sq mi)
- Time zone: UTC+3 (Yemen Standard Time)

Al Haymah Ad Dakhiliyah district is a district of the Sana'a Governorate, Yemen. As of 2003, the district had a population of 83,234 inhabitants.
