= Jabal Habashi district =

Jabal Habashi District
- District
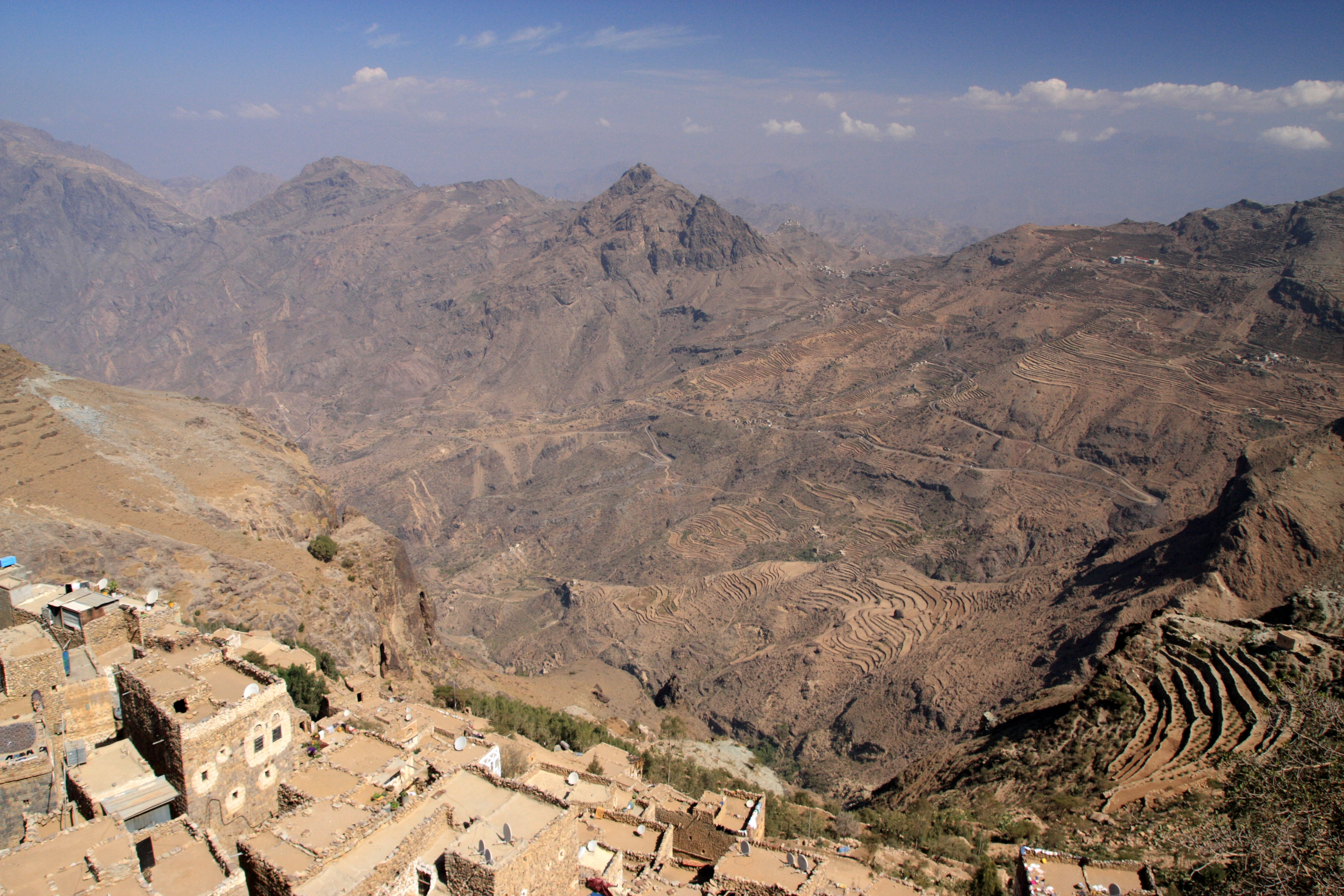

- Location in Yemen
- Coordinates: 13°28′00″N 43°52′50″E
- Country: Yemen
- Governorate: Taiz

Population (2003)
  - Total: 24,544
- Time zone: UTC+3 (Yemen Standard Time)

Jabal Habashi District is a district of the Taiz Governorate, Yemen. As of 2003, the district had a population of 24,544 inhabitants. On 4 October 2026, the district was captured by the Houthis.
