= Taiz Governorate =

Governorate of Yemen

Taiz محافظة تَعِزّ
- Governorate
- Coordinates: 13°34′N 44°01′E
- Country: Yemen
- Region: Janad Region
- Seat: Taiz

Government
  - Governor: Nabeel Shamam

Area
  - Total: 12,605 km^{2} (4,867 sq mi)

Population (2011)
  - Total: 2,885,000
  - Density: 228.9/km^{2} (592.8/sq mi)

Taiz (Arabic: تَعِزّ, romanized: Taʿizz) is a governorate of Yemen. Its capital Taiz, the third-largest city in Yemen, is among the most important commercial centres in the country, owing to its proximity to farmland, the Red Sea port of Mokha and Taiz International Airport.

== Geography ==
Taiz Governorate has an extraordinarily diverse geography. The western half is part of the Tihamah coastal plain and has an exceedingly hot, humid and arid climate. The eastern half is very mountainous, with the major peak being 3,070-metre-high Jabal Sabir, near Taiz city. These mountains trap the moisture created by an upper-level wind reversal between April and October, so that annual rainfall increases from 200 millimetres (8 inches) in the foothills to more than 1,000 millimetres (40 inches) near Jebel Saber. Temperatures in the highlands remain high during the daytime, but at the highest elevations they can fall to -5 °C (23 °F) overnight.

=== Mountain ranges ===
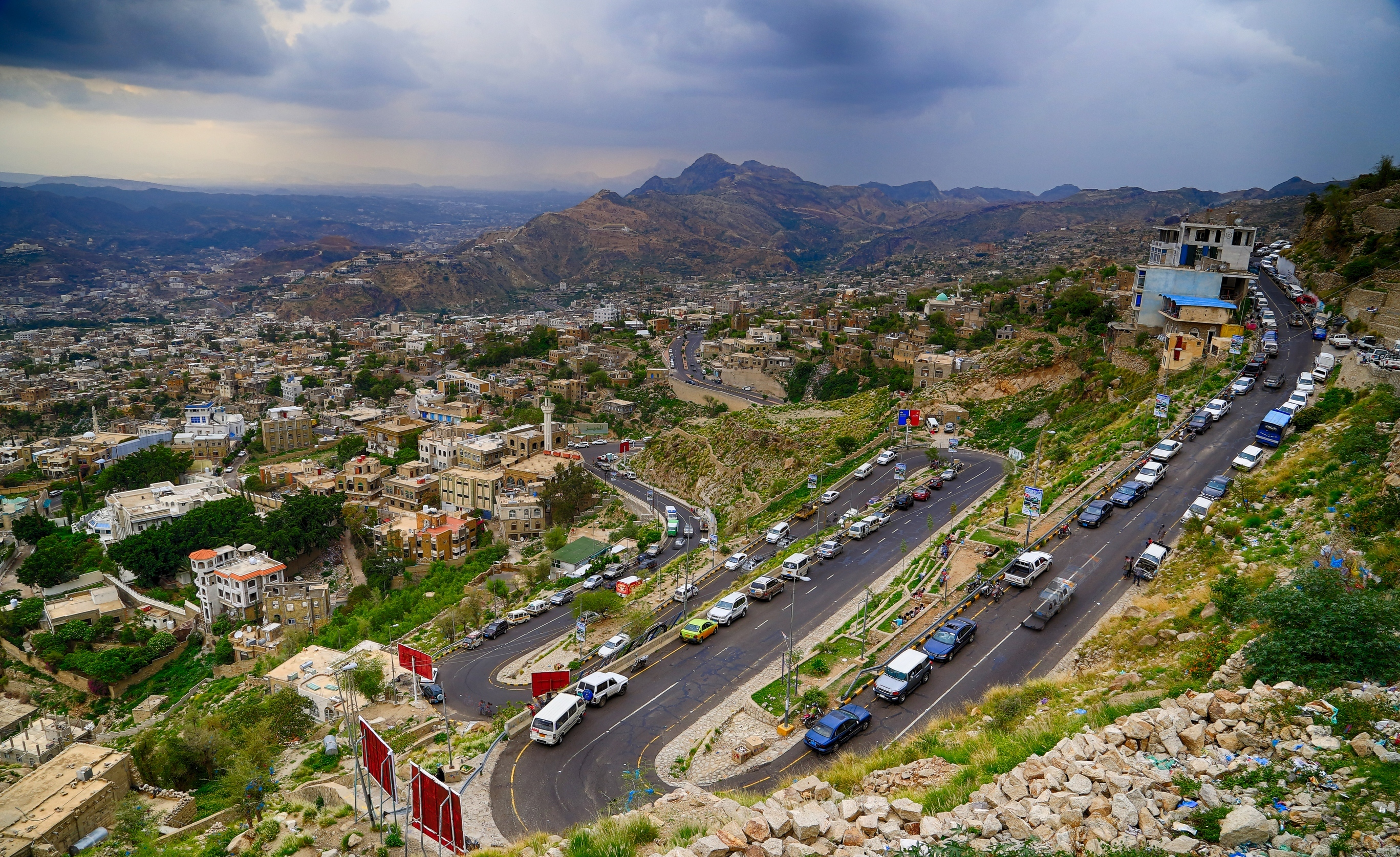
Road in Jabal Sabir

The governorate has many mountains ranging in height from 1,000 to 3,200 metres. The most important mountains are Jabal Sabir, Jabal Habashi, Jabal Samaʿa, Jabal Qadas, Jabal As-Silw, the mountains of al-Wazi'iyah and the Mountains of Shar'ab and Maqbanah.

=== Streams ===
There are many streams (wadi Arabic: وادي), perennial and seasonal:

==== Perennial streams ====
- Wadi Rasian, in Mawza, Shara'b Ar Rawnah, al-Makha and Maqbanah.
- Wadi Warzan, in Khadir and al-Mawasit.
- Wadi al-Dhabab, in al-Mawasit and Hayfan.
- Wadi Ar-Ram, in al-Mafalis region, Hayfan.
- Wadi al-Dhabab, in Sabir al-Mawadim.
- Wadi al-Ashroh or Wadi al-Barakani, in al-Mawasit.
- Wadi al-Janah, in al-Wazi'iyah.
- Wadi al-Lahya, in Mawza.

==== Seasonal streams ====
Streams that only run in the wet season are:

Districts	Seasonal streams
Damnt Khadir	Wadi al-Shofiah
Mawaiah	Wadi al-Sudan, Wadi al-Gharman, Wadi al-Sawarih
As-Silw	Wadi Qoradah, Wadi al-Zubirah, Wadi al-Qatriah
Hayfan	Wadi al-Musali, Wadi Khawalah, Wadi Shawkah
Ash-Shamayatayn	Wadi Adim
Shar'ab Ar-Rawnah	Wadi Gaw'ah, Wadi al-Ma', Wadi Shamlah
Shar'ab As-Salam	Wadi al-fojeer, Wadi al-Habab, Wadi Hawsa', Wadi Nakhlah
Jabal Habashi	Wadi Hannah
al-Makha	Wadi Tanag, Wadi Kabir, Wadi Hathiah
At-Ta'iziyah	Wadi Haban
Sabir al-Mawadim	Wadi Sailat Hawas
Al-wazyiah	Wadi al-Makhshab, Wadi al-Mu'aqam, Wadi Hawlajah, Wadi Sumadah
Mawza	Wadi Janob, Wadi al-Gharafi, Wadi al-Majash, Wadi Hagharamah, Wadi al-Murra, Wadi Sha'bo

=== Adjacent governorates ===
Governorates of Yemen

- Al Hudaydah Governorate (north)
- Ibb Governorate (north)
- Dhale Governorate (northeast)
- Lahij Governorate (southeast)

=== Districts ===
Map shows districts of Taiz

Taiz Governorate is divided into 23 districts, each divided into sub-districts, and then into villages:

- Al Mukha District
- Al Ma'afer District
- Al Mawasit District
- Al Misrakh District
- Al Mudhaffar District
- Al Qahirah District
- Al Wazi'iyah District
- As Silw District
- Ash Shamayatayn District
- At Ta'iziyah District
- Dhubab District
- Dimnat Khadir District
- Hayfan District
- Jabal Habashy District
- Maqbanah District
- Mashra'a Wa Hadnan District
- Mawiyah District
- Mawza District
- Sabir Al Mawadim District
- Salh District
- Sama District
- Shara'b Ar Rawnah District
- Shara'b As Salam District

== Economy ==
In the Tihamah region, irrigated crops include cotton, sorghum and sesame. Mangoes, papayas and bananas are the major crops of the western escarpment, and further up coffee and khat are grown. Although wine is prohibited in Islam, grapes are grown to produce raisins.

== Wildlife ==
The most common wild animals are hyenas, rock hyrax, rabbits, hedgehog, and monkeys. The most common wild birds are vultures, falcons, partridges, owls, pigeons, hoopoes, bulbuls.

== Regions ==
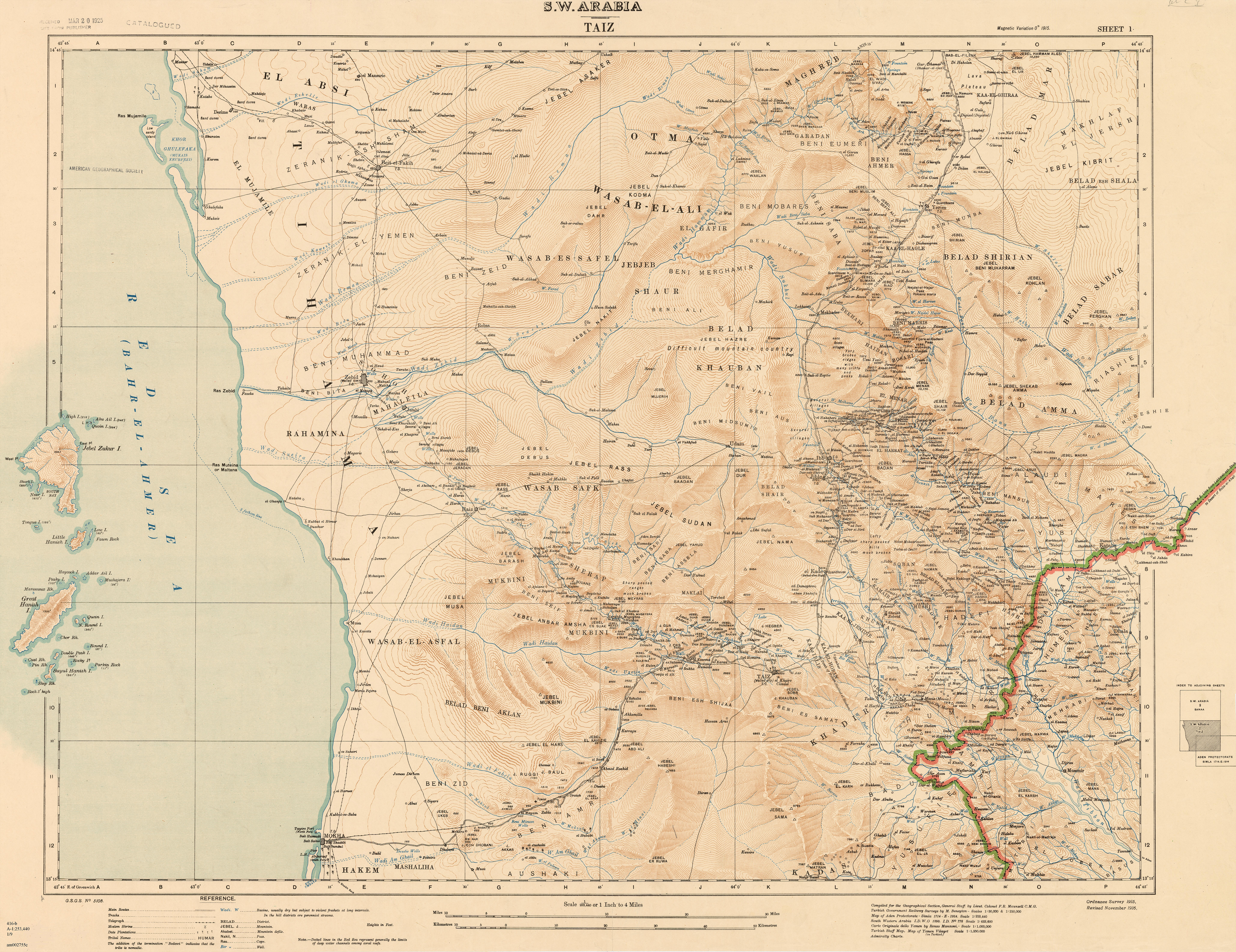
Regions of Taiz

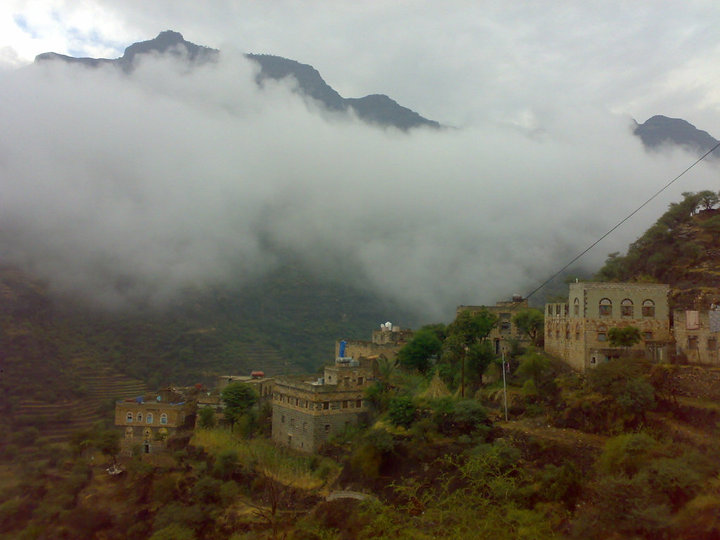
al-Hujariah region

- Shamir: (Arabic: شمير) also called "Shamir Maqbanah". It is a mountainous region part of Maqbanah district.
- Al-Hugariyyah: (Arabic: الحجرية) It is the largest region in Taiz governorate. It is sometimes mistakenly called al-Hujariah district. The region is part of As-Silw, al-Ma'afer, Hayfan, Sama', al-Mawasit, Jabal Habashy, Dimnat Khadir, and al-Wazi'iyah districts.

== Islands ==
- Perim
- Jazirat Ziadi

== Notable people ==
Mohsen Ayed, journalist and author
