= Shahidabad =

Shahidabad (Persian: شهيداباد) may refer to:

- Shahidabad, Fars
- Shahidabad, Manujan, Kerman Province
- Shahidabad, Qaleh Ganj, Kerman Province
- Shahidabad, Rudbar-e Jonubi, Kerman Province
- Shahidabad-e Tang Seh Riz, Kohgiluyeh and Boyer-Ahmad Province
- Shahidabad, Amol, Mazandaran Province
- Shahidabad, Babol, Mazandaran Province
- Shahidabad, Behshahr, Mazandaran Province
- Shahidabad, Qazvin
- Shahidabad, Razavi Khorasan
- Shahidabad-e Saruk, Khash County, Sistan and Baluchestan Province
- Shahidabad, Zanjan
- Shahidabad Rural District (disambiguation)
