= Burah =

Burah may refer to:

- Burah, the Persian derived name for borax
- Gom Burah or gaon burah, the head of the Bori tribe
- Burah Sara, a village in Iran
- Burah (Dune), a character in the Dune series by Frank Herbert
- Burah region in Maqbanah District in Yemen, as mentioned in the Battle of Taiz

== See also ==
- Borah (disambiguation)
- Bura (disambiguation)
- Bora (disambiguation)
- Burrah, a type of kebab
- Burahol
