= Bura =

Bura may refer to:

== Nature ==
- Bura (wind), the Croatian name for the bora wind in the northern Mediterranean
- Bura (beetle), a genus of beetles

== Places ==
- Bura (Achaea), a city in Greece
- Boura, Burkina Faso (disambiguation), also spelled Bura
- Bura, Iran (disambiguation)
- Bura, Taita-Taveta District, Kenya
- Bura, Tana River District, Kenya
- Bura (lake), a lake in Kazakhstan and Russia

== People and civilizations ==
- Bura people or Kilba, an ethnic group in Nigeria
- Bura language (also Bura-Pabir), a Chadic language spoken in Nigeria
- Bura archaeological site, an ancient and medieval civilization in southwest Niger
  - Bura culture, known for ceramics and metallurgy
- John Bura (1944–2023), Ukrainian Greek Catholic prelate in the United States
- Olha Bura (1986–2014), Ukrainian activist

== Sport and games ==
- Bura (footballer) (born 1988), Portuguese footballer
- Bura (water polo club), Croatian water polo club
- Bura (card game), a Russian prisoners' card game

== Other ==
- Bura (mythology), a figure in Greek mythology
- Bura Irrigation and Settlement Project (Kenya), a large irrigation project
- BURA (information technology), Backup, Recovery and Archiving
- BURA (Brunel University Research Archives) at Brunel University London
