= Savatsi =

Savatsi (Persian: سوت سي) may refer to:

- Savatsi Aqalar
- Savatsi Gol Chub
- Savatsi Shiadeh
