= Sefid Tur =

Sefid Tur (Persian: سفيدتور) may refer to:

- Sefid Tur-e Bala
- Sefid Tur-e Pain
