= Shiadeh =

Shiadeh or Shia Deh or Sheyadeh (Persian: شياده) may refer to:

- Shiadeh-e Bala
- Shiadeh Sadat Mahalleh
