= Pari Kola =

Pari Kola (Persian: پريكلا) may refer to:

- Pari Kola, Bandpey-ye Gharbi
- Pari Kola, Lalehabad
