= Bura, Iran =

Bura or Bowra (Persian: بورا), in Iran, may refer to:

- Bala Bowra, Upper Bowra
- Mian Bura, Middle Bura
