= Kam Kola =

Village in Mazandaran province, Iran

Kam Kola Persian: كامكلا
- Village
- Location within Iran
- Coordinates: 36°21′32″N 52°32′35″E
- Country: Iran
- Province: Mazandaran
- County: Babol
- District: Bandpey-e Gharbi
- Rural District: Khvosh Rud

Population (2016)
  - Total: 595
- Time zone: UTC+3:30 (IRST)

Kam Kola (Persian: كامكلا) (Note: Also romanized as Kām Kolā) is a village in Khvosh Rud Rural District of Bandpey-e Gharbi District in Babol County, Mazandaran province, Iran.

== Demographics ==
=== Population ===
At the time of the 2006 National Census, the village's population was 573 in 144 households. The following census in 2011 counted 567 people in 169 households. The 2016 census measured the population of the village as 595 people in 192 households.
