= Boura =

Boura may refer to:

- Boura (Achaea) ancient Greek city
- Boura, Burkina Faso (disambiguation)
- Boura, Mali
- Boura, a village in Forăști Commune, Suceava County, Romania
- Amal Boura (born 2006), Comorian footballer

== See also ==
- Bouras, a surname
