= Savatsi Gol Chub =

Savatsi Gol Chub سوت سي گل چوب
- Village
- Country: Iran
- Province: Mazandaran
- County: Babol
- Bakhsh: Bandpey-ye Gharbi
- Rural District: Khvosh Rud

Population (2006)
  - Total: 24
- Time zone: UTC+3:30 (IRST)
  - Summer (DST): UTC+4:30 (IRDT)

Savatsi Gol Chub (Persian: سوت سي گل چوب, also Romanized as Savatsī Gol Chūb) is a village in Khvosh Rud Rural District, Bandpey-ye Gharbi District, Babol County, Mazandaran Province, Iran. At the 2006 census, its population was 24, in 5 families.
