= Qanbarzadeh =

Village in Mazandaran province, Iran

Qanbarzadeh Persian: قنبرزاده
- Village
- Country: Iran
- Province: Mazandaran
- County: Babol
- District: Bandpey-e Gharbi
- Rural District: Shahidabad

Population (2016)
  - Total: 119
- Time zone: UTC+3:30 (IRST)

Qanbarzadeh (Persian: قنبرزاده) (Note: Also romanized as Qanbarzādeh) is a village in Shahidabad Rural District of Bandpey-e Gharbi District in Babol County, Mazandaran province, Iran.

== Demographics ==
=== Population ===
At the time of the 2006 National Census, the village's population was 105 in 27 households. The following census in 2011 counted 108 people in 30 households. The 2016 census measured the population of the village as 119 people in 39 households.
