= Shiadeh-e Bala =

Shiadeh-e Bala شياده بالا
- Village
- Location within Iran
- Coordinates: 36°20′07″N 52°31′56″E
- Country: Iran
- Province: Mazandaran
- County: Babol
- Bakhsh: Bandpey-ye Gharbi
- Rural District: Khvosh Rud

Population (2006)
  - Total: 151
- Time zone: UTC+3:30 (IRST)
  - Summer (DST): UTC+4:30 (IRDT)

Shiadeh-e Bala (Persian: شياده بالا, also Romanized as Shīādeh-e Bālā; also known as Shīādeh-e Bālā Maḩalleh) is a village in Khvosh Rud Rural District, Bandpey-ye Gharbi District, Babol County, Mazandaran Province, Iran. At the 2006 census, its population was 151, in 41 families.
