= Shub Kola =

Village in Mazandaran province, Iran

Shub Kola Persian: شوب كلا
- Village
- Location within Iran
- Coordinates: 36°26′04″N 52°35′36″E
- Country: Iran
- Province: Mazandaran
- County: Babol
- District: Bandpey-e Gharbi
- Rural District: Shahidabad

Population (2016)
  - Total: 1,590
- Time zone: UTC+3:30 (IRST)

Shub Kola (Persian: شوب كلا) (Note: Also romanized as Shūb Kolā) is a village in Shahidabad Rural District of Bandpey-e Gharbi District in Babol County, Mazandaran province, Iran.

== Demographics ==
=== Population ===
At the time of the 2006 National Census, the village's population was 1,711 in 459 households. The following census in 2011 counted 1,654 people in 526 households. The 2016 census measured the population of the village as 1,590 people in 563 households.
