= 2015 Taiz attack =

Missile strike in Yemen

December 2015 Taiz missile attack
- Part of Taiz campaign (2015–present)
Date	14 December 2015
Location	Taiz Governorate, Yemen
Result	Houthi tactical victory

Belligerents
(Yemen) Revolutionary Committee: Houthis	Cabinet of Yemen; Supported by: Arab Coalition: Saudi Arabia; United Arab Emirates; Morocco; Sudan; United States; Academi PMCs

Commanders and leaders
Unknown Houthi Commander	(Saudi Arabia) Col. Abdullah al-Sahian † (Head of Saudi Arabian Special Forces in Taiz area) (United Arab Emirates) Col. Sultan Mohammed Ali al-Kitbi † (Colombia) Cmdr. Carlos Nicholas † (Academi PMC Colombian Mercenary Unit Brigade Commander)

Casualties and losses
None	(Yemen) 53+ soldiers killed (Saudi Arabia) 23 soldiers killed (United Arab Emirates) 7 soldiers killed (Morocco) 9 soldiers killed (Sudan) 18 soldiers killed 42 Academi PMCs killed

The December 2015 Taiz missile attack was a strike carried out by the pro-Saleh Yemeni Army and Houthi militants with a Tochka ballistic missile against a military camp that was being used by troops of the Saudi-led coalition, south-west of the city of Taiz. The strike inflicted numerous casualties on the coalition forces. Reports said that there were 152 casualties in the camp, including 23 Saudi, 18 Sudanese, 9 Moroccan, and 7 Emirati servicemen reportedly killed. Large amounts of military material were destroyed, including vehicles and air-defense systems. In addition, Houthi militants claimed to have killed at least 40 mercenaries of the Academi private military company in the missile strike.

== See also ==
- September 2015 Marib Tochka missile attack
- 2016 Al Anad Air Base missile attack
