= Bouras =

Bouras or Booras is a surname of Greek origin (Greek: Μπούρας). Notable people with the surname include:

- Athanasios Bouras, Greek politician
- Charalambos Bouras (1933–2016), Greek architect and historian
- Djamel Bouras (born 1971), French judoka
- Hamza Bouras (born 1987), Algerian sailor
- Gillian Bouras (born 1945), Australian writer
- Nick Bouras, Greek psychiatrist
- Zahra Bouras (born 1987), Algerian middle-distance runner

== See also ==
- Boura (disambiguation)
