= Shaneh Tarash =

Village in Mazandaran province, Iran

Shaneh Tarash Persian: شانه تراش
- Village
- Location within Iran
- Coordinates: 36°23′10″N 52°34′11″E
- Country: Iran
- Province: Mazandaran
- County: Babol
- District: Bandpey-e Gharbi
- Rural District: Shahidabad

Population (2011)
  - Total: 454
- Time zone: UTC+3:30 (IRST)

Shaneh Tarash (Persian: شانه تراش) (Note: Also romanized as Shāneh Tarāsh; also known as Shāneh and Terāsh) is a village in Shahidabad Rural District of Bandpey-e Gharbi District in Babol County, Mazandaran province, Iran.

== Demographics ==
=== Population ===
At the time of the 2006 National Census, the village's population was 462 in 129 households. The following census in 2011 counted 454 people in 160 households. The village did not appear in the 2016 census.
