= Boz Rud Pey =

Village in Mazandaran province, Iran

Boz Rud Pey Persian: بزرودپي
- Village
- Location within Iran
- Coordinates: 36°23′01″N 52°34′04″E
- Country: Iran
- Province: Mazandaran
- County: Babol
- District: Bandpey-e Gharbi
- Rural District: Shahidabad

Population (2011)
  - Total: 702
- Time zone: UTC+3:30 (IRST)

Boz Rud Pey (Persian: بزرودپي) (Note: Also romanized as Boz Rūd Pey) is a village in Shahidabad Rural District of Bandpey-e Gharbi District in Babol County, Mazandaran province, Iran.

== Demographics ==
=== Population ===
At the time of the 2006 National Census, the village's population was 627 in 166 households. The following census in 2011 counted 702 people in 213 households. The village did not appear in the 2016 census.
