= Lamsu Kola-ye Gharbi =

Village in Mazandaran province, Iran

Lamsu Kola-ye Gharbi Persian: لمسوكلاغربي
- Village
- Location within Iran
- Coordinates: 36°21′21″N 52°34′26″E
- Country: Iran
- Province: Mazandaran
- County: Babol
- District: Bandpey-e Gharbi
- Rural District: Khvosh Rud

Population (2016)
  - Total: 473
- Time zone: UTC+3:30 (IRST)

Lamsu Kola-ye Gharbi (Persian: لمسوكلاغربي) (Note: Also romanized as Lamsū Kolā-ye Gharbī; also known as Lamsū Kolā) is a village in Khvosh Rud Rural District of Bandpey-e Gharbi District in Babol County, Mazandaran province, Iran.

== Demographics ==
=== Population ===
At the time of the 2006 National Census, the village's population was 570 in 146 households. The following census in 2011 counted 481 people in 152 households. The 2016 census measured the population of the village as 473 people in 165 households.
