= Yazdanabad, Mazandaran =

Village in Mazandaran province, Iran

Yazdanabad Persian: يزدان اباد
- Village
- Country: Iran
- Province: Mazandaran
- County: Babol
- District: Bandpey-e Gharbi
- Rural District: Shahidabad

Population (2016)
  - Total: 76
- Time zone: UTC+3:30 (IRST)

Yazdanabad (Persian: یزدان‌آباد) (Note: Also romanized as Yazdānābād) is a village in Shahidabad Rural District of Bandpey-e Gharbi District in Babol County, Mazandaran province, Iran.

== Demographics ==
=== Population ===
At the time of the 2006 National Census, the village's population was 64 in 16 households. The following census in 2011 counted 64 people in 20 households. The 2016 census measured the population of the village as 76 people in 28 households.
