= Shiadeh Sadat Mahalleh =

Shiadeh Sadat Mahalleh شياده سادات محله
- Village
- Location within Iran
- Coordinates: 36°19′48″N 52°31′38″E
- Country: Iran
- Province: Mazandaran
- County: Babol
- Bakhsh: Bandpey-ye Gharbi
- Rural District: Khvosh Rud

Population (2006)
  - Total: 372
- Time zone: UTC+3:30 (IRST)
  - Summer (DST): UTC+4:30 (IRDT)

Shiadeh Sadat Mahalleh (Persian: شياده سادات محله, also Romanized as Shīādeh Sādāt Maḩalleh, Sheyādeh Sādāt Maḩalleh, and Shīā Deh Sādāt Maḩalleh; also known as Shīā Deh) is a village in Khvosh Rud Rural District, Bandpey-ye Gharbi District, Babol County, Mazandaran Province, Iran. At the 2006 census, its population was 372, in 97 families.
