= Mowmenabad, Mazandaran =

Village in Mazandaran province, Iran

Mowmenabad Persian: مومن اباد
- Village
- Location within Iran
- Coordinates: 36°23′46″N 52°32′51″E
- Country: Iran
- Province: Mazandaran
- County: Babol
- District: Bandpey-e Gharbi
- Rural District: Shahidabad

Population (2016)
  - Total: 734
- Time zone: UTC+3:30 (IRST)

Mowmenabad (Persian: مؤمن‌آباد) (Note: Also romanized as Mowmenābād) is a village in Shahidabad Rural District of Bandpey-e Gharbi District in Babol County, Mazandaran province, Iran.

== Demographics ==
=== Population ===
At the time of the 2006 National Census, the village's population was 830 in 237 households. The following census in 2011 counted 702 people in 236 households. The 2016 census measured the population of the village as 734 people in 282 households.
