= Kardi Kola =

Village in Mazandaran province, Iran

Kardi Kola Persian: كارديكلا
- Village
- Location within Iran
- Coordinates: 36°21′48″N 52°33′17″E
- Country: Iran
- Province: Mazandaran
- County: Babol
- District: Bandpey-e Gharbi
- Rural District: Khvosh Rud

Population (2016)
  - Total: 651
- Time zone: UTC+3:30 (IRST)

Kardi Kola (Persian: كارديكلا) (Note: Also romanized as Kārdī Kolā; also known as Kārdī Kolā-ye Sharqī) is a village in Khvosh Rud Rural District of Bandpey-e Gharbi District in Babol County, Mazandaran province, Iran.

== Demographics ==
=== Population ===
At the time of the 2006 National Census, the village's population was 656 in 165 households. The following census in 2011 counted 687 people in 212 households. The 2016 census measured the population of the village as 651 people in 217 households.
