= Kahar Kenar-e Keshtali =

Village in Mazandaran province, Iran

Kahar Kenar-e Keshtali Persian: كهركناركشتلي
- Village
- Location within Iran
- Coordinates: 36°23′37″N 52°35′29″E
- Country: Iran
- Province: Mazandaran
- County: Babol
- District: Bandpey-e Gharbi
- Rural District: Shahidabad

Population (2016)
  - Total: 1,027
- Time zone: UTC+3:30 (IRST)

Kahar Kenar-e Keshtali (Persian: كهركناركشتلي) (Note: Also romanized as Kahar Kenār-e Keshtalī; also known as Kahar Kenār and Kar Kenār) is a village in Shahidabad Rural District of Bandpey-e Gharbi District in Babol County, Mazandaran province, Iran.

== Demographics ==
=== Population ===
At the time of the 2006 National Census, the village's population was 1,049 in 268 households. The following census in 2011 counted 1,017 people in 305 households. The 2016 census measured the population of the village as 1,027 people in 343 households.
