= Salehdar Kola =

Village in Mazandaran province, Iran

Salehdar Kola Persian: صلح داركلا
- Village
- Location within Iran
- Coordinates: 36°24′00″N 52°34′23″E
- Country: Iran
- Province: Mazandaran
- County: Babol
- District: Bandpey-e Gharbi
- Rural District: Shahidabad

Population (2016)
  - Total: 867
- Time zone: UTC+3:30 (IRST)

Salehdar Kola (Persian: صلح داركلا) (Note: Also romanized as Şaleḩdār Kolā) is a village in Shahidabad Rural District of Bandpey-e Gharbi District in Babol County, Mazandaran province, Iran.

== Demographics ==
=== Population ===
At the time of the 2006 National Census, the village's population was 889 in 258 households. The following census in 2011 counted 951 people in 285 households. The 2016 census measured the population of the village as 867 people in 296 households.
