= Diva Malekshah =

Village in Mazandaran province, Iran

Diva Malekshah Persian: ديوا ملكشاه
- Village
- Location within Iran
- Coordinates: 36°19′03″N 52°33′39″E
- Country: Iran
- Province: Mazandaran
- County: Babol
- District: Bandpey-e Gharbi
- Rural District: Khvosh Rud

Population (2016)
  - Total: 1,868
- Time zone: UTC+3:30 (IRST)

Diva Malekshah (Persian: ديوا ملكشاه) (Note: Also romanized as Dīvā Malekshāh, Diva Molkshah, and Dīvā Molkshāh) is a village in Khvosh Rud Rural District of Bandpey-e Gharbi District in Babol County, Mazandaran province, Iran.

== Demographics ==
=== Population ===
At the time of the 2006 National Census, the village's population was 2,119 in 611 households. The following census in 2011 counted 2,020 people in 642 households. The 2016 census measured the population of the village as 1,868 people in 643 households. It was the most populous village in its rural district.
