= 2015 Marib attack =

Missile strike on a military base in Yemen

Marib Tochka missile attack
- Part of the Yemeni Civil War (2014–present) and the Saudi Arabian-led intervention in Yemen
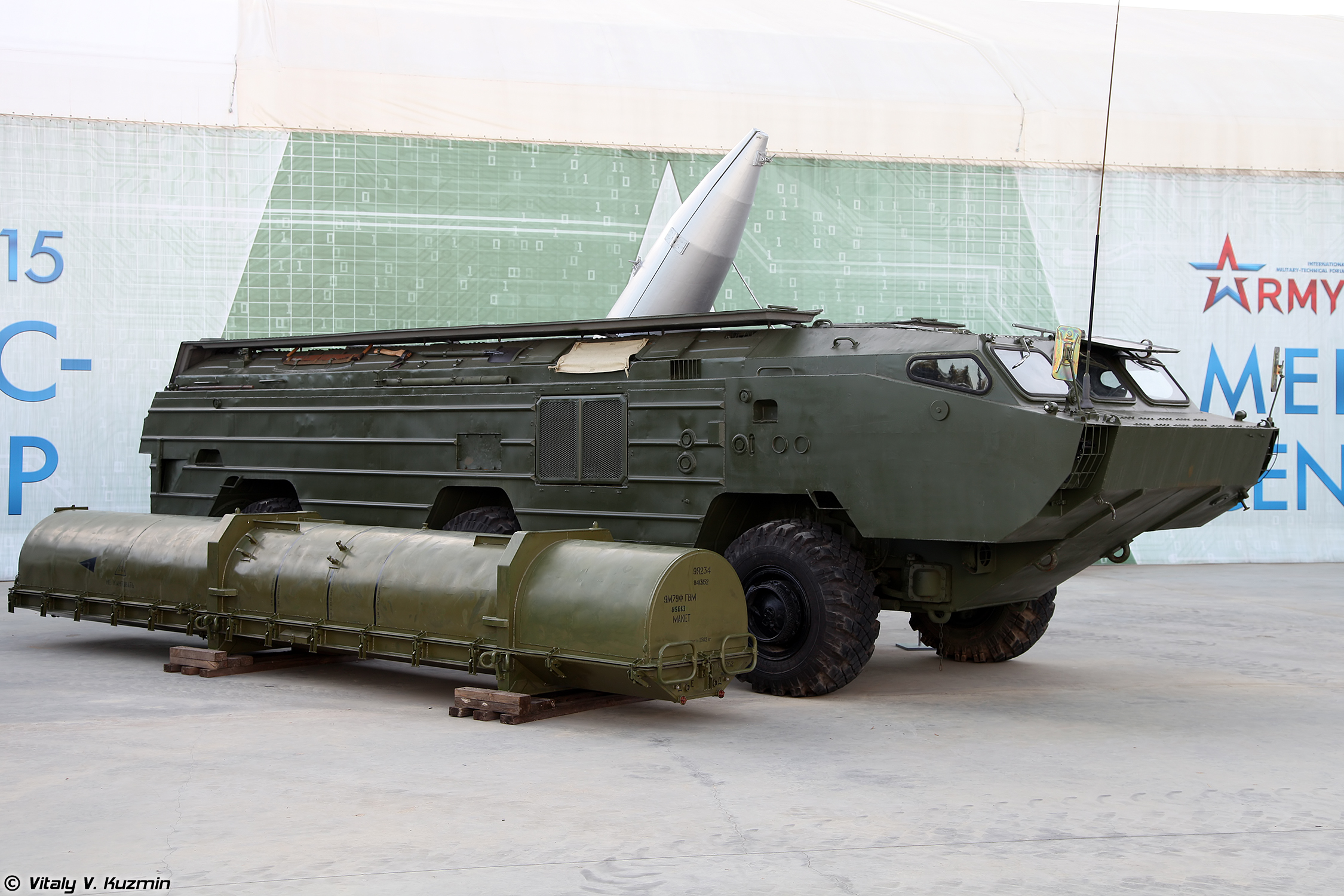
- Picture of an OTR-21 Tochka missile launcher, used by the Houthis in the attack
- Location: Safer, Marib Governorate, Yemen
- Target: Yemen (Hadi-led government); Saudi Arabia; United Arab Emirates; Bahrain
- Date: 4 September 2015
- Executed by: Houthis
- Outcome: Houthi success: Heavy casualties on coalition troops; Deadliest attack in the history of the UAE Armed Forces
- Casualties: (Yemen) 36 pro-Hadi soldiers killed (United Arab Emirates) 52 Emirati soldiers killed (Saudi Arabia) 10 Saudi soldiers killed (Bahrain) 5 Bahraini soldiers killed

On 4 September 2015, the Houthis launched an OTR-21 Tochka ballistic missile against a military base in Safer, an area in Marib Governorate. The base was being used by military forces of the Saudi-led coalition. The missile hit an ammunition dump, creating a huge explosion which inflicted numerous casualties among coalition troops. 52 Emirati, ten Saudi, five Bahraini soldiers and 36 pro-Hadi Yemeni troops were killed in the attack.

== Aftermath ==
The United Arab Emirates Air Force F16F Block 60 conducted several airstrikes on Marib, Sanaa, and Saada in retaliation for the attack, which was described as "the heaviest airstrikes Sanaa endured". The UAEAF also bombed the position from which the missile was believed to have been fired.

The United Arab Emirates declared a three-day period of mourning with the UAE flag flying at half-mast in honor of the soldiers killed in Yemen, the deadliest episode in UAE army history. The UAE leaders, including sheikh Mohammed bin Zayed Al Nahyan, sheikh Mohammed bin Rashid Al Maktoum, and the sheikhs of the Federal Supreme Council, visited the family homes of each of the fallen soldiers and offered their condolences.

United States Secretary of State John Kerry offered his condolences to the UAE Foreign Minister Abdullah bin Zayed Al Nahyan on the death of the Emirati soldiers.

== See also ==
- December 2015 Taiz missile attack
- 2016 Al Anad Air Base missile attack
