= Moallem Kola, Babol =

Village in Mazandaran province, Iran

Moallem Kola Persian: معلم كلا
- Village
- Location within Iran
- Coordinates: 36°25′48″N 52°36′22″E
- Country: Iran
- Province: Mazandaran
- County: Babol
- District: Bandpey-e Gharbi
- Rural District: Shahidabad

Population (2016)
  - Total: 885
- Time zone: UTC+3:30 (IRST)

Moallem Kola (Persian: معلم كلا) (Note: Also romanized as Mo‘allem Kolā) is a village in Shahidabad Rural District of Bandpey-e Gharbi District in Babol County, Mazandaran province, Iran.

== Demographics ==
=== Population ===
At the time of the 2006 National Census, the village's population was 893 in 232 households. The following census in 2011 counted 949 people in 281 households. The 2016 census measured the population of the village as 885 people in 283 households.
