= Pat Rud Pey =

Village in Mazandaran province, Iran

Pat Rud Pey Persian: پطرودپي
- Village
- Location within Iran
- Coordinates: 36°23′07″N 52°34′38″E
- Country: Iran
- Province: Mazandaran
- County: Babol
- District: Bandpey-e Gharbi
- Rural District: Shahidabad

Population (2016)
  - Total: 355
- Time zone: UTC+3:30 (IRST)

Pat Rud Pey (Persian: پطرودپي) (Note: Also romanized as Paţ Rūd Pey) is a village in Shahidabad Rural District of Bandpey-e Gharbi District in Babol County, Mazandaran province, Iran.

== Demographics ==
=== Population ===
At the time of the 2006 National Census, the village's population was 462 in 127 households. The following census in 2011 counted 372 people in 118 households. The 2016 census measured the population of the village as 355 people in 124 households.
