= Sefid Tur-e Pain =

Sefid Tur-e Pain سفيدتورپايين
- Village
- Location within Iran
- Coordinates: 36°22′00″N 52°36′00″E
- Country: Iran
- Province: Mazandaran
- County: Babol
- Bakhsh: Bandpey-ye Gharbi
- Rural District: Khvosh Rud

Population (2006)
  - Total: 378
- Time zone: UTC+3:30 (IRST)
  - Summer (DST): UTC+4:30 (IRDT)

Sefid Tur-e Pain (Persian: سفيدتورپايين, also Romanized as Sefīd Ţūr-e Pā’īn) is a village in Khvosh Rud Rural District, Bandpey-ye Gharbi District, Babol County, Mazandaran Province, Iran. At the 2006 census, its population was 378, in 108 families.
