= Kelagar Sara =

Village in Mazandaran province, Iran

Kelagar Sara Persian: کلاگرسرا
- Village
- Location within Iran
- Coordinates: 36°25′35″N 52°36′01″E
- Country: Iran
- Province: Mazandaran
- County: Babol
- District: Bandpey-e Gharbi
- Rural District: Shahidabad

Population (2016)
  - Total: 369
- Time zone: UTC+3:30 (IRST)

Kelagar Sara (Persian: کلاگرسرا) (Note: Also romanized as Kelāgar Sarā; formerly known as Kelagar Mahalleh (كلاگرمحله), also romanized as Kelāgar Maḩalleh) is a village in Shahidabad Rural District of Bandpey-e Gharbi District in Babol County, Mazandaran province, Iran.

== Demographics ==
=== Population ===
At the time of the 2006 National Census, the village's population, as Kelagar Mahalleh, was 476 in 119 households. The following census in 2011 counted 390 people in 122 households. The 2016 census measured the population of the village as 369 people in 128 households, by which time the village was listed as Kelagar Sara.
