= Firuzabad, Bandpey-e Gharbi =

Village in Mazandaran province, Iran

Firuzabad Persian: فیروزآباد
- Village
- Country: Iran
- Province: Mazandaran
- County: Babol
- District: Bandpey-e Gharbi
- Rural District: Shahidabad

Population (2016)
  - Total: 213
- Time zone: UTC+3:30 (IRST)

Firuzabad (Persian: فیروزآباد) (Note: Also romanized as Fīrūzābād) is a village in Shahidabad Rural District of Bandpey-e Gharbi District in Babol County, Mazandaran province, Iran.

== Demographics ==
=== Population ===
At the time of the 2006 National Census, the village's population was 159 in 40 households. The following census in 2011 counted 213 people in 65 households. The 2016 census measured the population of the village as 213 people in 77 households.
