= Sultan Mohammed Ali al-Kitbi =

- سلطان محمد علي الكتبي
- Born: Mohammed Ali al-Kitbi; 1970
- Died: 14 December 2015 (aged 45); Taiz, Yemen
- Cause of death: Rocket attack
- Military career
- Allegiance: United Arab Emirates
- Branch: United Arab Emirates Army
- Service years: 1990s–2015
- Rank: Colonel
- Conflicts: Yemeni civil war; Saudi-led intervention; Siege of Taiz

Sultan Mohammed Ali al-Kitbi (1970, United Arab Emirates—14 December 2015, Taiz, Yemen) was a colonel of the United Arab Emirates Army who became one of the most senior officers killed during the Saudi Arabian-led intervention in the Yemeni civil war. He was also the highest ranking UAE officer to have been killed. In his legacy, the standard issue of the UAE armed forces rifle, the CAR 816, is named Caracal Sultan and bears an engraving honoring him.

== Biography ==
Mohammed Ali al-Kitbi was born around 1970 in the United Arab Emirates and served in its armed forces since the 1990s, including as part of peacekeeping missions in Somalia and Kosovo.

During the Saudi Arabian-led coalition's intervention in the Yemeni civil war, Al-Kitbi took part in Operation Restoring Hope and was involved in the fighting to capture the city of Taiz, in southern Yemen. He was killed in a rocket attack by Houthi rebels on Monday, 14 December 2015, near Taiz along with Saudi Arabian colonel Abdullah al-Sahian. His body was later returned to the UAE.

Al-Kitbi had seven children. His brother is a former member of the Federal National Council.

== See also ==
- CAR 816
