= Shahidabad Rural District =

Shahidabad Rural District (Persian: دهستان شهيدآباد) may refer to:

- Shahidabad Rural District (Fars Province)
- Shahidabad Rural District (Mazandaran Province)
- Shahidabad Rural District (Qazvin Province)
