= Khush Rudpey =

City in Mazandaran province, Iran

Khush Rudpey Persian: خوش رودپي
- City
- Location within Iran
- Coordinates: 36°22′09″N 52°34′00″E
- Country: Iran
- Province: Mazandaran
- County: Babol
- District: Bandpey-ye Gharbi

Population (2016)
  - Total: 5,742
- Time zone: UTC+3:30 (IRST)

Khush Rudpey (Persian: خوش رودپي) (Note: Also known as Bālā Khvoshrūd Pey and Khvosh Rūd Pey-e Bālā) is a city in, and the capital of, Bandpey-ye Gharbi District of Babol County, Mazandaran province, Iran. It also serves as the administrative center for Khvosh Rud Rural District.

== Demographics ==
=== Population ===
At the time of the 2006 National Census, the city's population was 2,940 in 792 households. The following census in 2011 counted 3,317 people in 1,013 households. The 2016 census measured the population of the city as 5,742 people in 1,906 households.
