= Pari Kola, Bandpey-e Gharbi =

Village in Mazandaran province, Iran

Pari Kola Persian: پاريكلا
- Village
- Location within Iran
- Coordinates: 36°22′20″N 52°36′11″E
- Country: Iran
- Province: Mazandaran
- County: Babol
- District: Bandpey-e Gharbi
- Rural District: Khvosh Rud

Population (2016)
  - Total: 466
- Time zone: UTC+3:30 (IRST)

Pari Kola (Persian: پاريكلا) (Note: Also romanized as Pārī Kolā) is a village in Khvosh Rud Rural District of Bandpey-e Gharbi District in Babol County, Mazandaran province, Iran.

== Demographics ==
=== Population ===
At the time of the 2006 National Census, the village's population was 432 in 112 households. The following census in 2011 counted 530 people in 141 households. The 2016 census measured the population of the village as 466 people in 145 households.
