= Mian Bura =

Village in Mazandaran province, Iran

Mian Bura Persian: ميان بورا
- Village
- Location within Iran
- Coordinates: 36°21′31″N 52°34′08″E
- Country: Iran
- Province: Mazandaran
- County: Babol
- District: Bandpey-e Gharbi
- Rural District: Khvosh Rud

Population (2016)
  - Total: 450
- Time zone: UTC+3:30 (IRST)

Mian Bura (Persian: ميان بورا) (Note: Also romanized as Mīān Būrā) is a village in Khvosh Rud Rural District of Bandpey-e Gharbi District in Babol County, Mazandaran province, Iran.

== Demographics ==
=== Population ===
At the time of the 2006 National Census, the village's population was 329 in 96 households. The following census in 2011 counted 393 people in 131 households. The 2016 census measured the population of the village as 450 people in 160 households.
