= Bala Bura =

Village in Mazandaran province, Iran

Bala Bura Persian: بالابورا
- Village
- Location within Iran
- Coordinates: 36°21′04″N 52°33′52″E
- Country: Iran
- Province: Mazandaran
- County: Babol
- District: Bandpey-e Gharbi
- Rural District: Khvosh Rud

Population (2016)
  - Total: 324
- Time zone: UTC+3:30 (IRST)

Bala Bura (Persian: بالابورا) (Note: Also romanized as Bala Bowra, Bālā Bowrā, and Bālā Būrā; also known as Sar Būrā and Sarbūrā) is a village in Khvosh Rud Rural District of Bandpey-e Gharbi District in Babol County, Mazandaran province, Iran.

== Demographics ==
=== Population ===
At the time of the 2006 National Census, the village's population was 348 in 90 households. The following census in 2011 counted 329 people in 93 households. The 2016 census measured the population of the village as 324 people in 110 households.
