= Shahidabad, Babol =

Village in Mazandaran province, Iran

Shahidabad Persian: شهیدآباد
- Village
- Location within Iran
- Coordinates: 36°24′45″N 52°33′36″E
- Country: Iran
- Province: Mazandaran
- County: Babol
- District: Bandpey-e Gharbi
- Rural District: Shahidabad

Population (2016)
  - Total: 2,947
- Time zone: UTC+3:30 (IRST)

Shahidabad (Persian: شهیدآباد) (Note: Also romanized as Shahīdābād) is a village in, and the capital of, Shahidabad Rural District in Bandpey-e Gharbi District of Babol County, Mazandaran province, Iran.

== Demographics ==
=== Population ===
At the time of the 2006 National Census, the village's population was 3,152 in 873 households. The following census in 2011 counted 3,105 people in 1,013 households. The 2016 census measured the population of the village as 2,947 people in 1,039 households. It was the most populous village in its rural district.
