= OTR-21 Tochka =

Soviet/Russian tactical ballistic missile

OTR-21 Tochka SS-21 Scarab
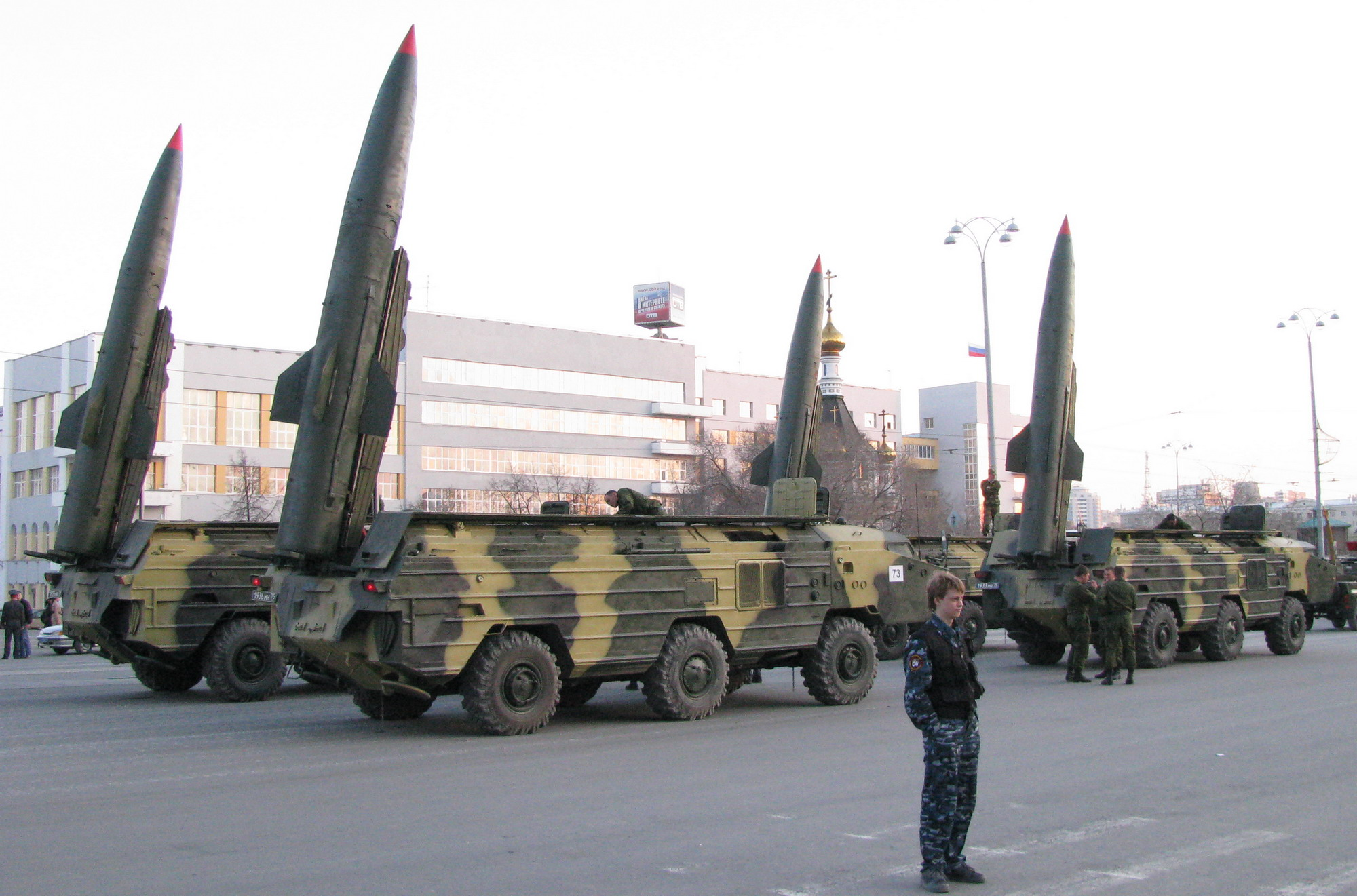
- Russian Tochka-U missile launchers at a rehearsal for a parade in Yekaterinburg
- Type: Tactical ballistic missile
- Place of origin: Soviet Union

Service history
- In service: 1976–present (Scarab A); 1989–present (Scarab B)
- Used by: See Operators
- Wars: Yemeni Civil War (1994); First Chechen War; Second Chechen War; Syrian Civil War; Russo-Ukrainian War; Yemeni Civil War (2015–present); 2020 Nagorno-Karabakh conflict

Production history
- Manufacturer: KBM (Kolomna)
- Unit cost: $300,000
- Produced: 1973

Specifications
- Mass: 2,000 kg (4,400 lb) Scarab A 2,010 kg (4,430 lb) Scarab B
- Length: 6,400 mm (250 in)
- Diameter: 650 mm (26 in)
- Crew: 3
- Maximum firing range: 70 km (43 mi) Scarab A 120 km (75 mi) Scarab B
- Warhead: Fragmentation, cluster, 100 kt nuclear warhead, EMP, or chemical filling
- Main armament: 1 × OTR 21/9K79 Tactical Ballistic Missile
- Engine: Single-stage solid-propellant rocket 96kN
- Maximum speed: 1.8 km/s (1.1 mi/s; Mach 5.3)
- Guidance system: Inertial guidance, Tochka-R added passive radar against radar installations
- Accuracy: 150 m (Tochka); 95 m (Tochka-U)
- Launch platform: BAZ-5921 Mobile TEL

OTR-21 Tochka (Russian: оперативно-тактический ракетный комплекс (ОТР) «Точка», romanized: operativno-takticheskiy raketnyy kompleks (OTR) "Tochka", lit. 'Tactical Operational Missile Complex "Point"') is a Soviet tactical ballistic missile. Its GRAU designation is 9K79. Its NATO reporting name is the SS-21 Scarab. One missile is transported per 9P129 vehicle and raised prior to launch. It uses an inertial guidance system.

The OTR-21 forward deployment to East Germany began in 1981, replacing the earlier Luna-M series of unguided artillery rockets. The system was scheduled to be decommissioned by the Russian Armed Forces in 2020 in favour of the 9K720 Iskander, but they have been observed in use against Ukrainian targets during the Russo-Ukrainian war.

== Description ==
The OTR-21 is a mobile missile launch system, designed to be deployed along with other land combat units on the battlefield. While the 9K52 Luna-M is large and relatively inaccurate, the OTR-21 is much smaller. The missile itself can be used for precise strikes on enemy tactical targets, such as control posts, bridges, storage facilities, troop concentrations and airfields. The fragmentation warhead can be replaced with a nuclear, biological or chemical warhead. The solid propellant makes the missile easy to maintain and deploy.

OTR-21 units are usually managed in a brigade structure. There are 18 launchers in a brigade. Each launcher is provided with two or three missiles.

The vehicle is amphibious, with a maximum road speed of 60 km/h (37 mph) and 8 km/h (5.0 mph) in water. The vehicle is NBC-protected. The system began development in 1968. Three variants were developed.

=== Tochka ===
The initial version, Tochka, NATO reporting name Scarab A, entered service with the Soviet Army in 1975. It carried one of four types of warhead:

- 9M123F unitary High explosive warhead. Weight 420 kilograms (930 lb).
- 9M123K submunitions warhead. Anti-personnel, anti-armour and anti-runway submunitions available.
- 9M79B nuclear. Selectable yield of 10 or 100 kT.
- 9N123R EMP warhead.

The minimum range was about 15 km (9.3 mi), maximum range was 70 km (43 mi). Its circular error probable (CEP) is estimated to be about 150 m (490 ft).

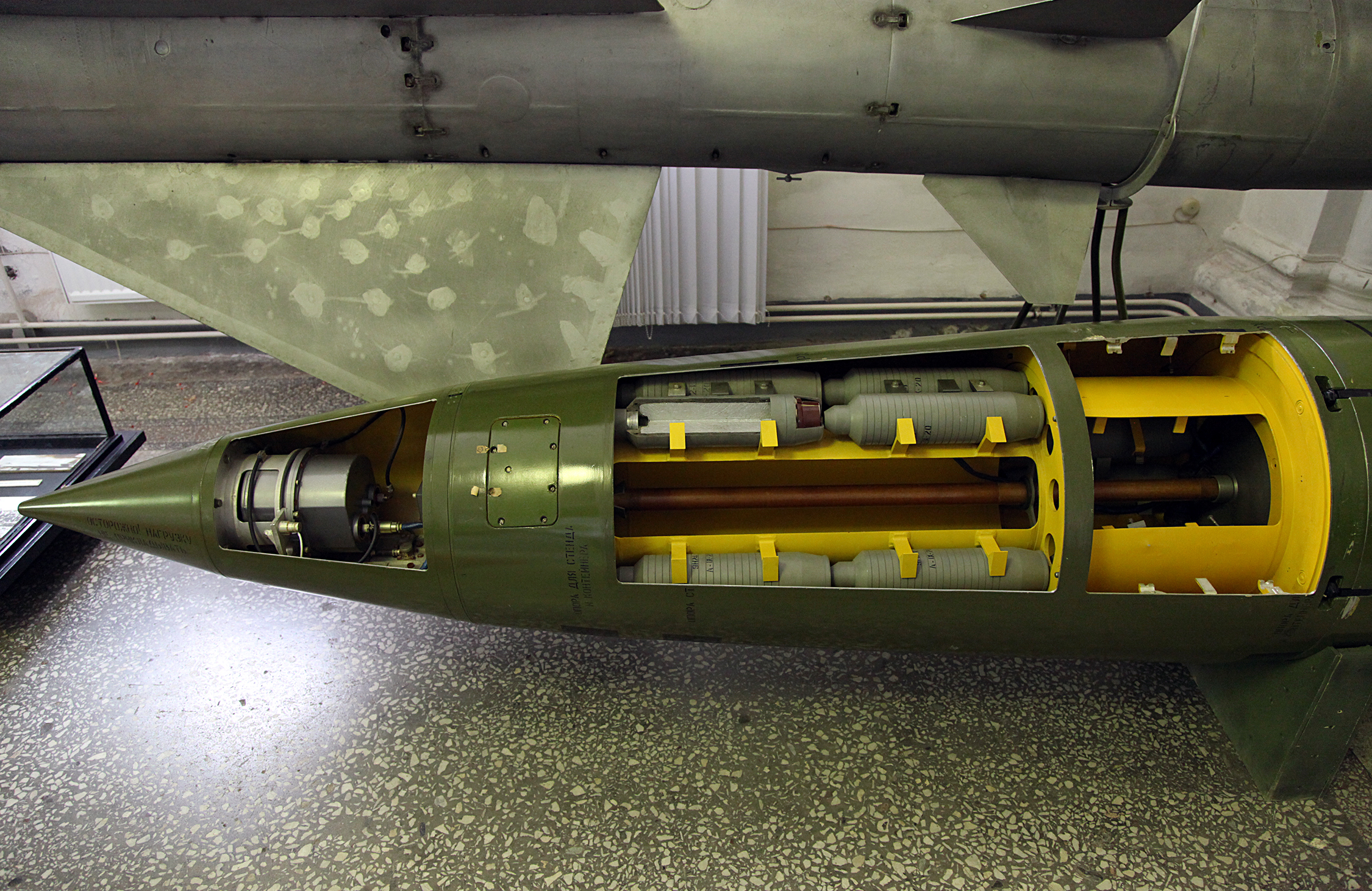
A 9M79K missile for the 9K79 Tochka missile system

=== Tochka-U ===
The improved Tochka-U, NATO reporting name Scarab B, passed state tests from 1986 to 1988, and was introduced in 1989.

A new motor propellant increased the range to 120 km (75 mi). The CEP significantly improved, to 95 m (312 ft). Six warhead options have been reported, a unitary high explosive warhead, an anti-personnel submunition dispenser, an anti-radar warhead, an EMP warhead and two nuclear warheads.

=== Scarab C ===
An unconfirmed third variant, designated Scarab C by NATO, may have been developed in the 1990s, but was likely never operational. Range increased to 185 km (115 mi), and the CEP decreased to less than 70 m (229 ft). Scarab C weighed 1,800 kg (4,000 lb).

=== Configuration ===
- 9M79 missiles with various types of warheads (-9M79-1 for Tochka U Complex).
- Launcher 9P129 or 9P129-1M (SPU);
- Transport and loading machine 9T218 or 9T128-1 (TZM);
- Transport vehicle 9T222 or 9T238 (TM);
- Automatic testing machine 9V819 or 9V819-1 (AKIM);
- Technical service vehicle 9V844 or 9V844M (MTO).
- Set of weapon equipment 9F370-1 (KAO);

Educational means:

- Simulator 9F625M;
- Missile overall weight model (such as 9M79K-GVM).
- 9M79-UT training missile and 9N123F (K) -UT, 9N39-UT warhead. 9H123F-R UT;
- 9M79-RM missile and 9N123K-RM missile split training model.

== Operational history ==
- During the Yemeni civil war (1994), the Yemeni government used Tochka missiles against southern forces.
- In 1999, Russia used the missiles in the Second Chechen War.
- In August 2008, at least 15 Tochka missiles were deployed by Russian forces during the 2008 South Ossetia war.
- In 2014, CNN reported that at least one was used near Donetsk during the War in Donbas, by either the Ukrainian Army or the Russian-backed separatist forces. The Ukrainian army issued a statement denying the use of the ballistic missile.
- In the early stages of the Russian invasion of Ukraine, the Tochka was the Ukrainian Army primary way of striking Russian air bases.

=== Syrian civil war (2011–present) ===
- In early December 2014, the Syrian Army fired at least one Tochka against Syrian rebels during the Siege of Wadi al-Deif (near Maarat al-Numan, in Idlib province).
- On 26 April 2016, the Syrian Army fired a Tochka at Syrian rebels in the Syrian Civil Defense Center in west Aleppo.
- On 14 June 2016, the Syrian Army fired a Tochka at Syrian rebel groups Al-Rahman Legion and Jaysh Al-Fustat in Eastern Ghouta, killing several fighters.
- On 20 March 2018, the Syrian Army fired a Tochka towards the Turkish Hatay province, which fell in the border district of Yayladağı without causing any casualties or damage.
- On 23 July 2018, the Syrian Army fired two Tochka missiles near the Israeli border. Initially thought to be inbound to Israel near the Sea of Galilee, two David's Sling interceptors were fired by Israel. A few moments later it became clear they were going to strike within Syria, as such one interceptor was detonated over Israel while the other one fell inside Syria. One Tochka missile landed 1 kilometer inside Syria.
- On 5 March 2021, the Syrian Army reportedly fired a KN-02 Toksa, a North Korean copy, solid fuelled short ranged missile against a major oil facility in the country’s Idlib governorate, which is currently under the control of Turkish-backed insurgents. The strike near oil facilities ignited major blazes and killed one and wounded 11 people.

=== Yemeni civil war (2014–present) ===
- On 4 September 2015, Houthi forces fired a Tochka missile at Safir base in Marib killing over 100 Saudi-led coalition personnel.
- On 14 December 2015, Houthi forces fired another Tochka missile at Bab Al Mandab base killing over 150 Saudi-led coalition personnel stationed there.
- On 16 January 2016, Houthi forces fired a Tochka at Al Bairaq base in Marib killing dozens of Saudi-led coalition personnel
- On 31 January 2016, Houthi forces fired a Tochka at Al Anad base in Lahj killing and wounding over 200 Saudi-led coalition personnel

=== 2020 Nagorno-Karabakh war ===
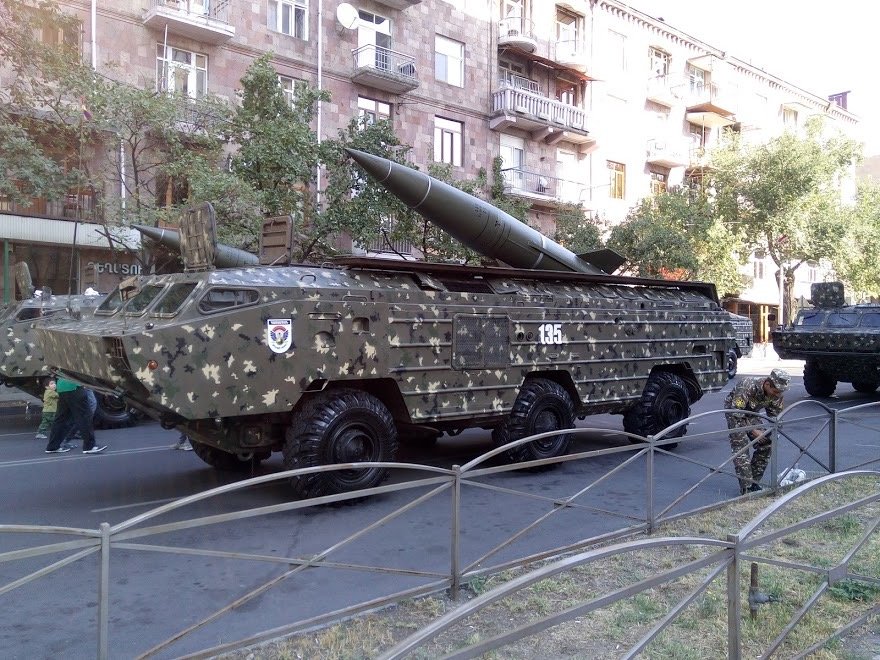
An Armenian OTR-21 during the Independence Day parade in Yerevan, 2016

- Armenia reportedly fired Tochka missiles against Ganja, Azerbaijan during the 2020 Nagorno-Karabakh conflict. According to analysts of the Center for Strategic and International Studies, the Armenians used Soviet-era missiles to preserve their small stockpile of Iskander missiles. Also both sides could hit most targets in the Nagorno-Karabakh region with long-range rocket artillery, limiting the tactical value of using more expensive ballistic missiles.

=== Russo-Ukrainian War ===
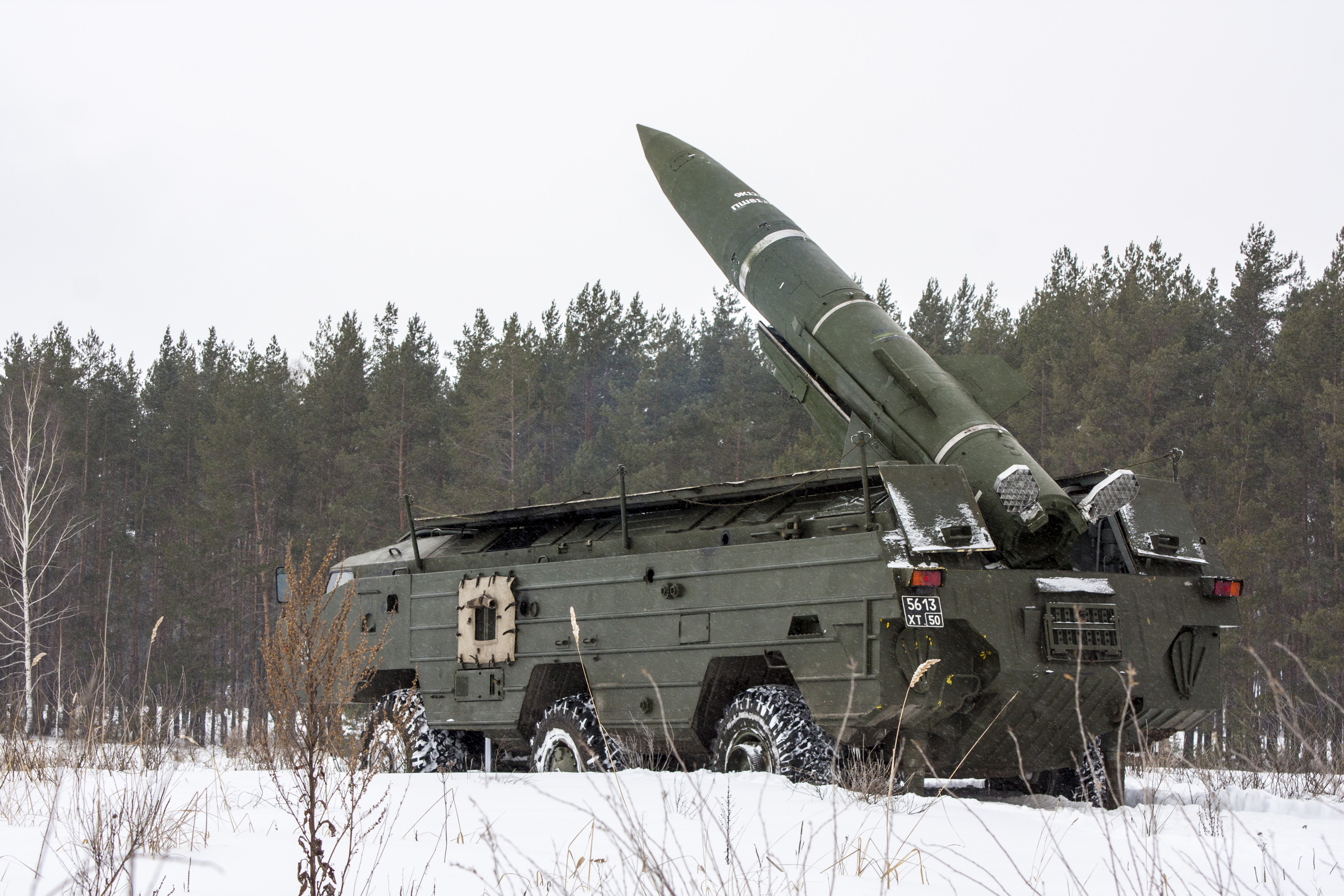
Tochka launcher of the Russian 448th Missile Brigade in 2018

- On 24 February 2022, Ukrainian forces launched a missile attack on Russian Millerovo air base in Rostov Oblast, using two Tochka-U ballistic missiles in response for the Russian invasion of Ukraine and to prevent further air strikes by the Russian air force against Ukraine. The attack left one Su-30SM destroyed on the ground.
- On 24 February 2022, a 9M79 Tochka missile fired by Russian forces struck near a hospital building in Vuhledar, Donetsk Oblast, Ukraine, killing 4 civilians and wounding 10. An Amnesty International investigation confirmed that the hospital was not a military target.
- On 14 March 2022, the Russian Federation and the government of the separatist Donetsk People Republic blamed Ukrainian forces of launching a Tochka-U missile which killed 23 civilians and wounded 28 in Donetsk. The housing facility was supposedly used as a barracks for separatists forces.
- On 19 March 2022, Russian forces claimed that they shot down a Ukrainian-fired missile near the Port of Berdiansk.
- On 24 March 2022, the Russian Navy landing ship Saratov, docked in Berdyansk port in Ukraine, caught fire and sunk. On 3 July, a Russian official confirmed the sinking of the Saratov, a Soviet era Tapir-class landing ship. The ship was hit by a Tochka-U missile. Russia claims that the ship was scuttled by its crew to prevent its munitions from exploding and that the ship has been salvaged since.
- On 8 April 2022, the railway station in Kramatorsk under Ukrainian control was hit by two Russian Tochka-U ballistic missiles. The attack killed at least 52 civilians and injured at least 87 more. Later, Russia falsely blamed Ukraine for the strike. The message in Russian "Za detei", meaning on behalf of the children, had been daubed on the missile in white.
- On 13 January 2023, Ukraine claimed to have killed over 100 Russian soldiers in the Soledar area using various special forces, artillery and a Tochka-U missile.
- On 12 May 2024, according to Russian government and state media reports, a Ukrainian missile attack reportedly containing Tochka-U's allegedly damaged a 10-story residential building in Belgorod, with a reported death toll of 15 people.

== Operators ==
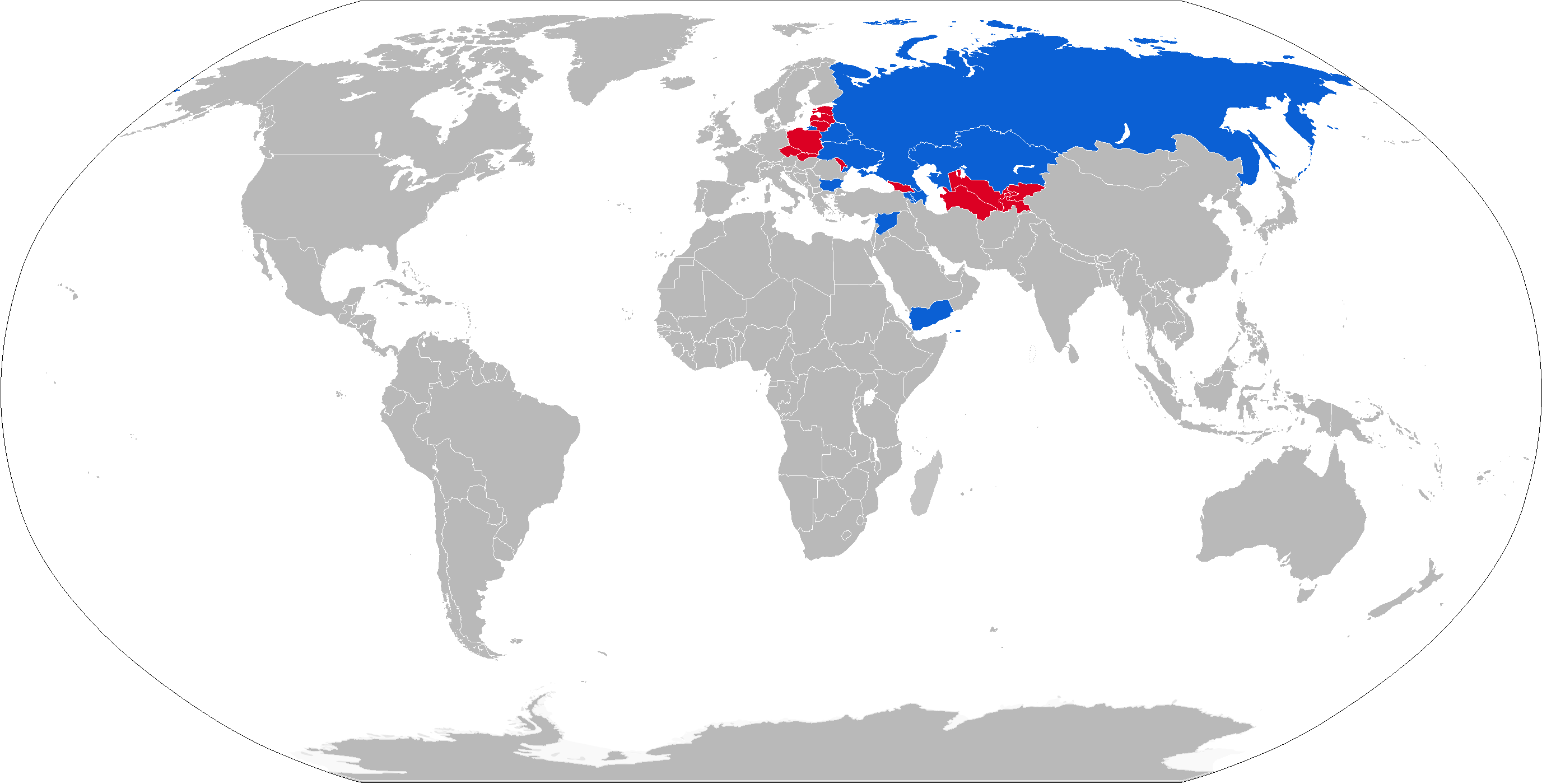
A map of OTR-21 operators in blue, with former operators in red. (Note: Russian Tochka-U ballistic missiles were returned to service during the invasion of Ukraine in March 2022).

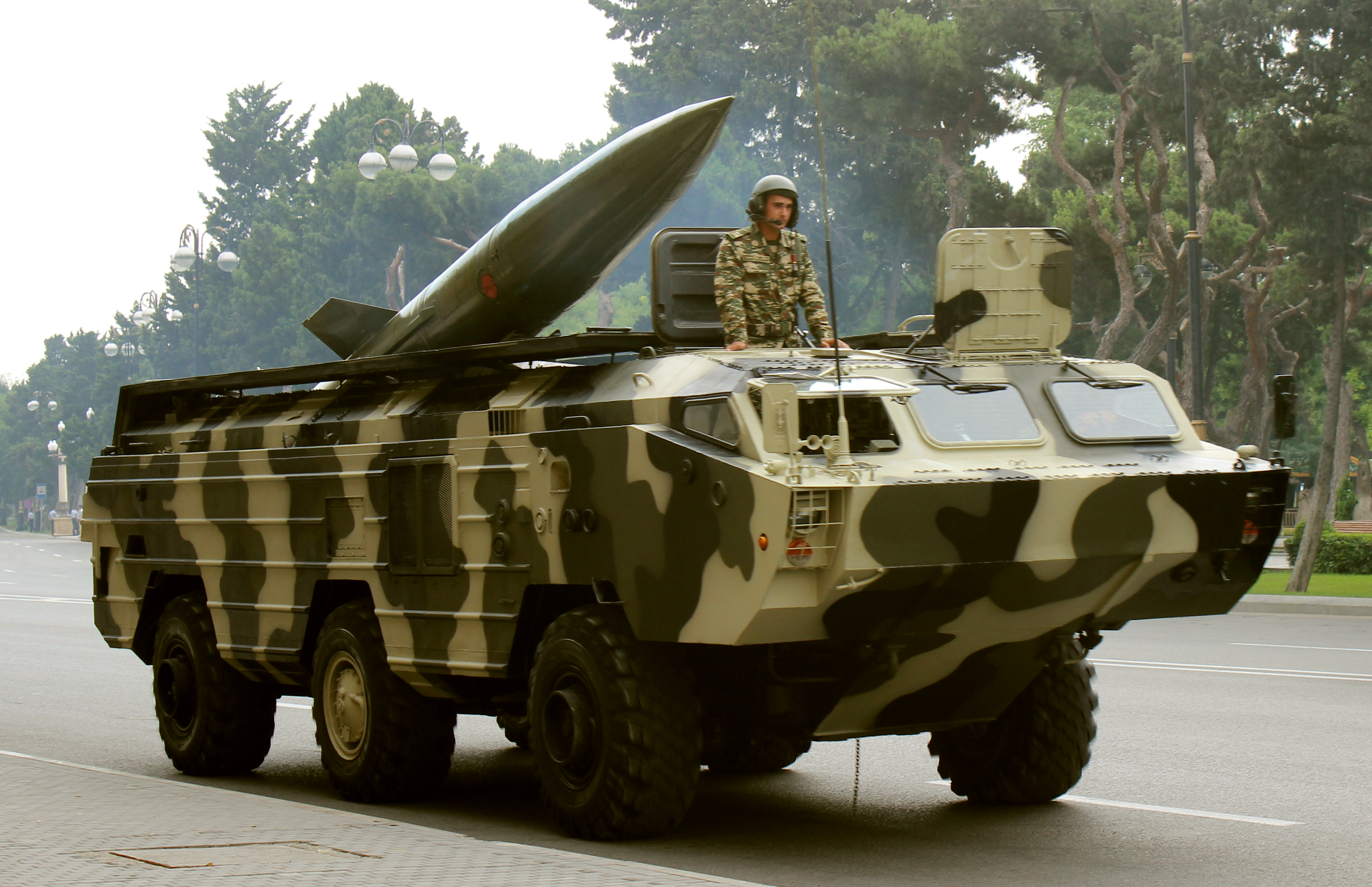
Azerbaijani Tochka launcher during a parade in Baku in 2013

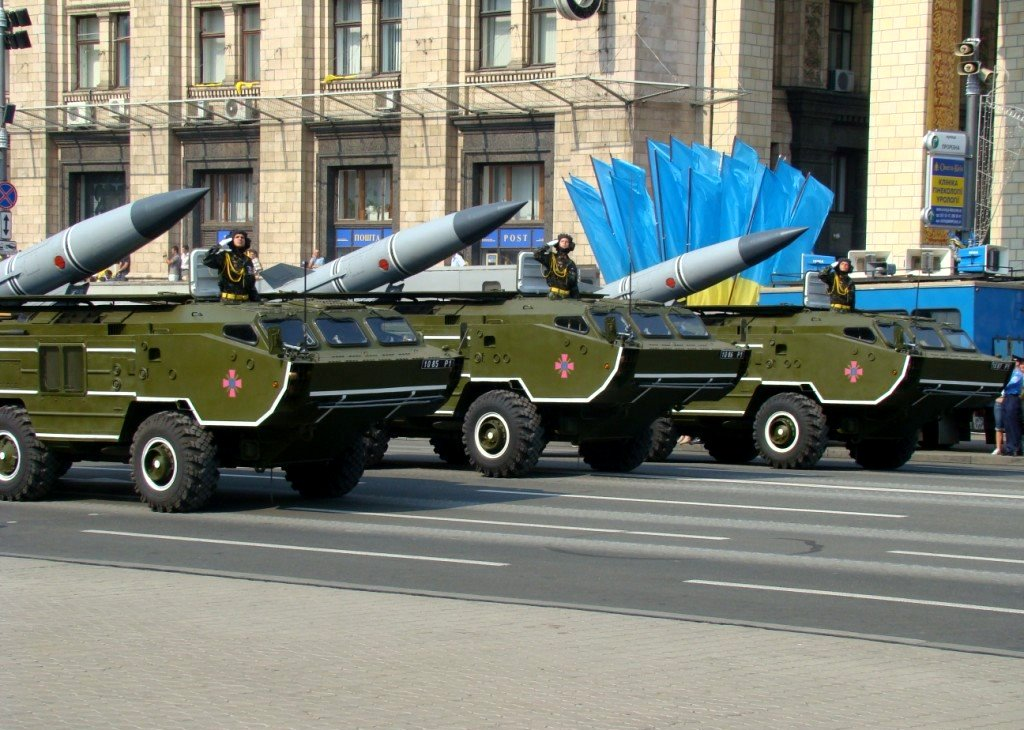
Ukrainian OTR-21 Tochka missiles during the Independence Day parade in Kyiv, 2008

=== Current operators ===
- Armenia − 3+ launchers as of 2024
- Azerbaijan − 4 Tochka-U launchers as of 2024
- Bulgaria − Unknown number of launchers as of 2024
- Kazakhstan − 12 launchers as of 2024
- North Korea − Unknown numbers of KN-02 Toksa variant as of 2024
- Russia − In 2022, it was estimated that Russia had 200 missiles in service, despite being largely replaced by the Iskander. 50 launchers as of 2024
- Ukraine − In 2022, it was estimated that Ukraine had 90 launchers and 500 missiles. Unknown number of launchers as of 2024, possibly no longer operational
- Syria − Unknown number of launchers prior to the fall of the Assad regime

=== Former operators ===
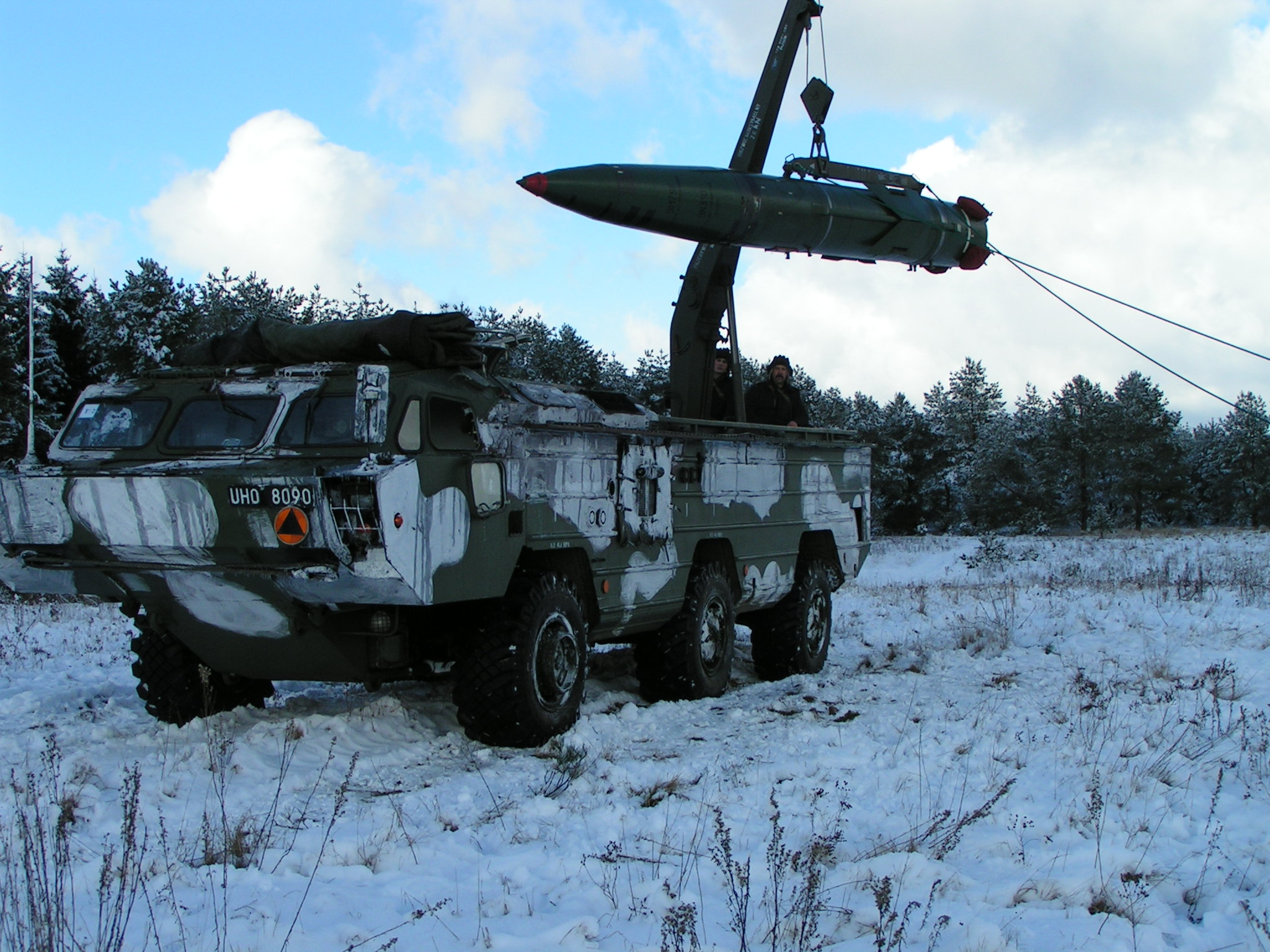
A Polish Tochka launcher being loaded with a missile in 2004

- Belarus − 36 Tochka-U launchers in 2022, split in three brigades with 12 launchers each according to the International Institute of Strategic Studies, while the Belarusian order of battle only lists the 465th Missile Brigade. None in service in 2024
- Czechoslovakia − 8 launchers in 1989. Passed on to successor states.
- Czech Republic − Inherited from Czechoslovakia, remained in service as late as 2004
- East Germany − 8 launchers in 1989, scrapped after the German reunification
- Poland − 4 launchers and 40 missiles delivered in 1987, remained in service as late as 2008
- Slovakia − Inherited a small number from Czechoslovakia, remained in service as late as 2001
- Soviet Union − 300 launchers in 1991, passed on to successor states
- North Yemen − Ordered 12 launchers and around 100 missiles. Declared operational in 1988. They were used during the 1994 civil war, and were passed on to unified Yemen after.
- Yemen − Inherited from North Yemen. Used during the 1994 civil war and the ongoing civil war. None in service in 2024

== See also ==
- MGM-52 Lance – (United States)
- 9K720 Iskander – (Russia)
- P-12 – (China)
- Prahaar – (India)
- LORA – (Israel)
- MGM-140 ATACMS – (United States)
