= Battle of Taiz =

Battle of the Yemeni Revolution

- Part of the Yemeni Revolution
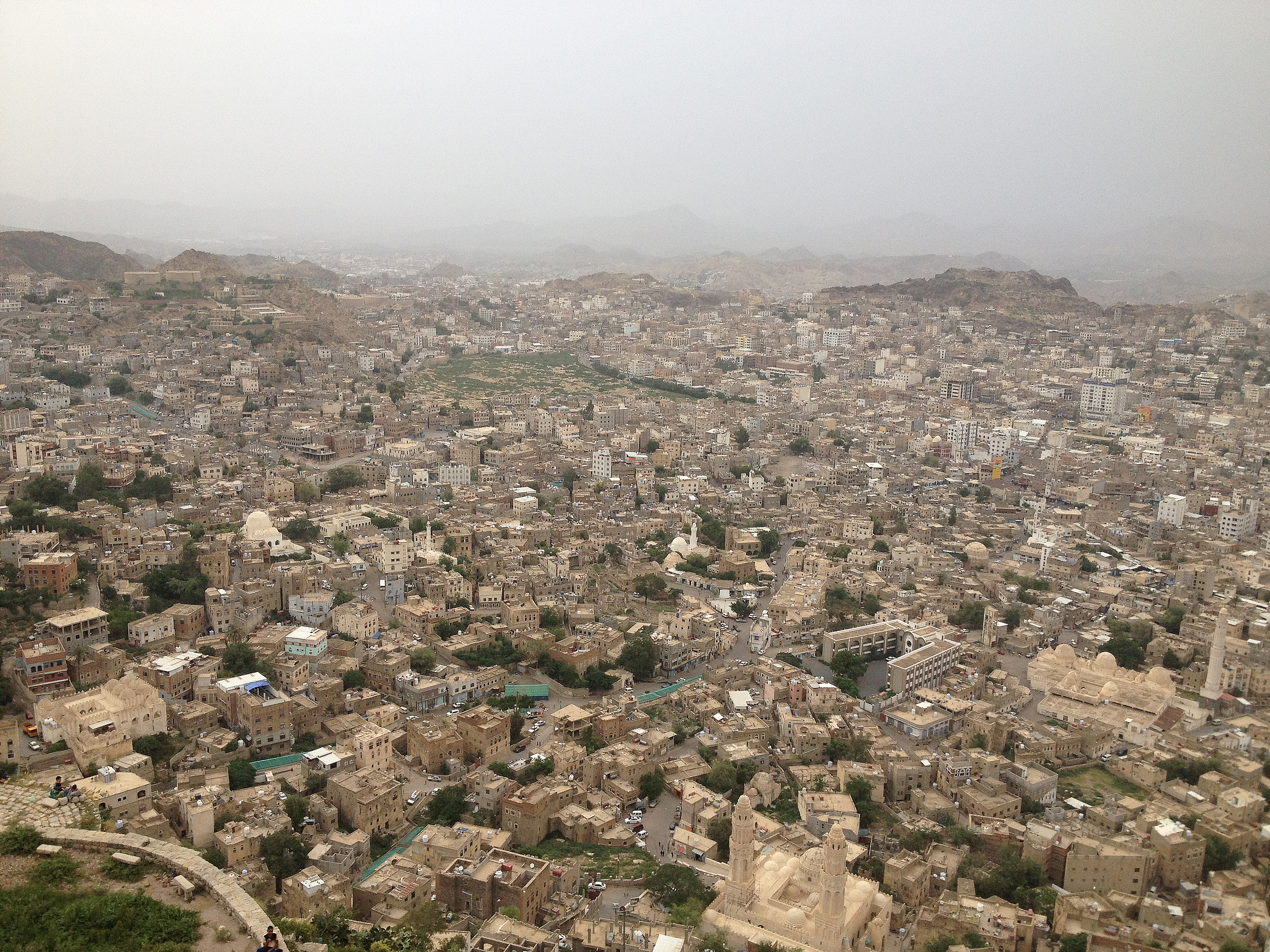
- Aerial view of the city
| Date | 28 May – 7 June 2011 (1 week and 3 days) |
| Location | Taiz, Yemen |
| Result | Alliance of Yemeni Tribes victory |

Belligerents
| Alliance of Yemeni Tribes | Yemen Army |

Commanders and leaders
| Sheik Hamoud al-Makhlafi | |

Strength
| 5,000 fighters | 33rd Armored Brigade 7,000–11,000 |

Casualties and losses
| 35–71 killed | 11 soldiers killed |
- 4 civilians killed

The Battle of Taiz erupted during the 2011 Yemeni Revolution, between forces loyal to Yemeni leader Ali Abdullah Saleh and opposition protesters, backed by armed tribesmen and defecting soldiers in the southwestern Yemeni city of Taiz.

== The battle ==
Opposition demonstrators had occupied the main square in the city since the start of the uprising against the rule of president Saleh. The protests were for the most part peaceful. However, that changed on 29 May, when the military started an operation to crush the protests and clear the demonstrators from their camp at the square. Troops reportedly fired live ammunition and used water cannons against the protesters, burned their tents and bulldozers ran over some of them. The opposition described the event as a massacre.

Street clashes continued and by 31 May, the death toll among the protesters had reached between 28 and 64. On 31 May, about 100 women protesters had gathered in a central square, challenging security forces nearby to use force, which would represent a breach of social norms. But the women were soon dispersed by female police officers and women supporters of the president.

On 2 June, armed protesters appeared on the streets for the first time and two of them were killed, along with three soldiers, in an exchange of fire.

On 3 June, four soldiers were killed by a rocket-propelled grenade fired by protesters. Another 26 were wounded in clashes in which two more protesters were killed and 30 wounded.

On 5 June, armed members of the opposition tried to storm the presidential palace. The fighting that ensued left four soldiers and one gunman dead.

On 7 June, about 400 opposition gunmen chased out the security forces from Ta'izz and took control of the city. After that, the military was trying to regroup outside the town for a counter-attack. During the clashes, a tank fired on a residential building near the presidential palace killing four people, including three children.

== Aftermath ==
On 14 June, women demonstrated against Saleh and demanded his removal from power. The next day, there were reports of violent clashes between government troops and opposition fighters in the city, leaving casualties on both sides. Two fuel tankers were also burned by the opposition.

On 16 June, demonstrators organised a large protest against regional and international attempts to undermine the movement and demanded the formation of a transitional council without any members of the Saleh regime. The march reached Freedom Square, where the protestors set up camp and resumed their sit-in.

On 1 August, two soldiers and one anti-government fighter were killed in clashes in the northern area of the city after tribal gunmen attacked a military checkpoint and army tanks shelled the northern parts of the town.

Between 1 and 4 December, 28 civilians were killed in clashes in the city. A number of government soldiers and opposition fighters were also killed.

== See also ==
- Yemeni civil war (2014–present)
- Saudi-led intervention in the Yemeni civil war
- Siege of Taiz
