= Bura (beetle) =

Scientific classification
- Kingdom: Animalia
- Phylum: Arthropoda
- Clade: Pancrustacea
- Class: Insecta
- Order: Coleoptera
- Suborder: Polyphaga
- Infraorder: Cucujiformia
- Family: Coccinellidae
- Subfamily: Coccidulinae
- Tribe: Coccidulini
- Genus: Bura; Mulsant, 1850
- Species: B. cuprea

Binomial name
- Bura cuprea Mulsant, 1850

Genus of beetles

Bura is a genus of beetle of the family Coccinellidae. It is monotypic, being represented by the single species, Bura cuprea, which is found on Hispaniola.

== Description ==
Adults reach a length of about 2.8–3.2 mm (0.11–0.13 in). They have a shiny body with a metallic green to blue sheen. The dorsum is mostly glabrous except for sparse marginal setae..
