= Nick Bouras =

Greek psychiatrist

Nick (Nicandros) Bouras is a Greek professor (emeritus) of psychiatry at the Institute of Psychiatry, Psychology and Neuroscience King's College London, United Kingdom and programme director of Maudsley International that promotes developments in mental health around the world.

== Academia ==
He was born in Patras, Greece and studied medicine at the University of Athens. Subsequently, he trained in Neurology and Psychiatry in Athens, the University of Oxford and the University of London and obtained a PhD from the University of London in 1979. Between 1982 and 1999 he was a senior lecturer in psychiatry at the Department of Psychiatry at Guy's Medical School and the United Medical and Dental Schools of Guy's and St Thomas' Hospitals, London. From 1982 to 2008 he was consultant psychiatrist for the South London and the Maudsley NHS Foundation Trust and from 1999 to 2008 he held a chair in psychiatry at the Health Service and Population Research Department, at the Institute of Psychiatry, King's College London.

== Research ==
His research has centred on the psychiatric ward environments, community psychiatry and the mental health of people with intellectual disabilities. He led the research programme in one of the first community mental health centres in the UK and was part of the development of the first community-based mental health service in the UK for people with intellectual disabilities. He studied the re-provision of services, following the closure of institutions. In 1999 he initiated and developed the Estia Centre, combining clinical services, training and research. He chaired the research and development group of the Daedalus Trust that provided a focal point for thinking about hubris behaviour and the ways that exercising power may affect personality and decision making. He also chaired the research advisory group of Thrive, a charity that uses horticultural therapy to support people with disabilities or mental ill health.

== Recognition ==
He is a fellow of the Royal College of Psychiatrists of the UK, the International Association for the Scientific Study of Intellectual Disability and has been chairman of the World Psychiatric Association, Section of Intellectual Disabilities, president of the psychiatry section of the Royal Society of Medicine and vice-president of the European Association of Mental Health in Intellectual Disabilities.

He was the editor of the journal Intellectual Disability Research – Mental Health and of special papers of the International Review of Psychiatry.
