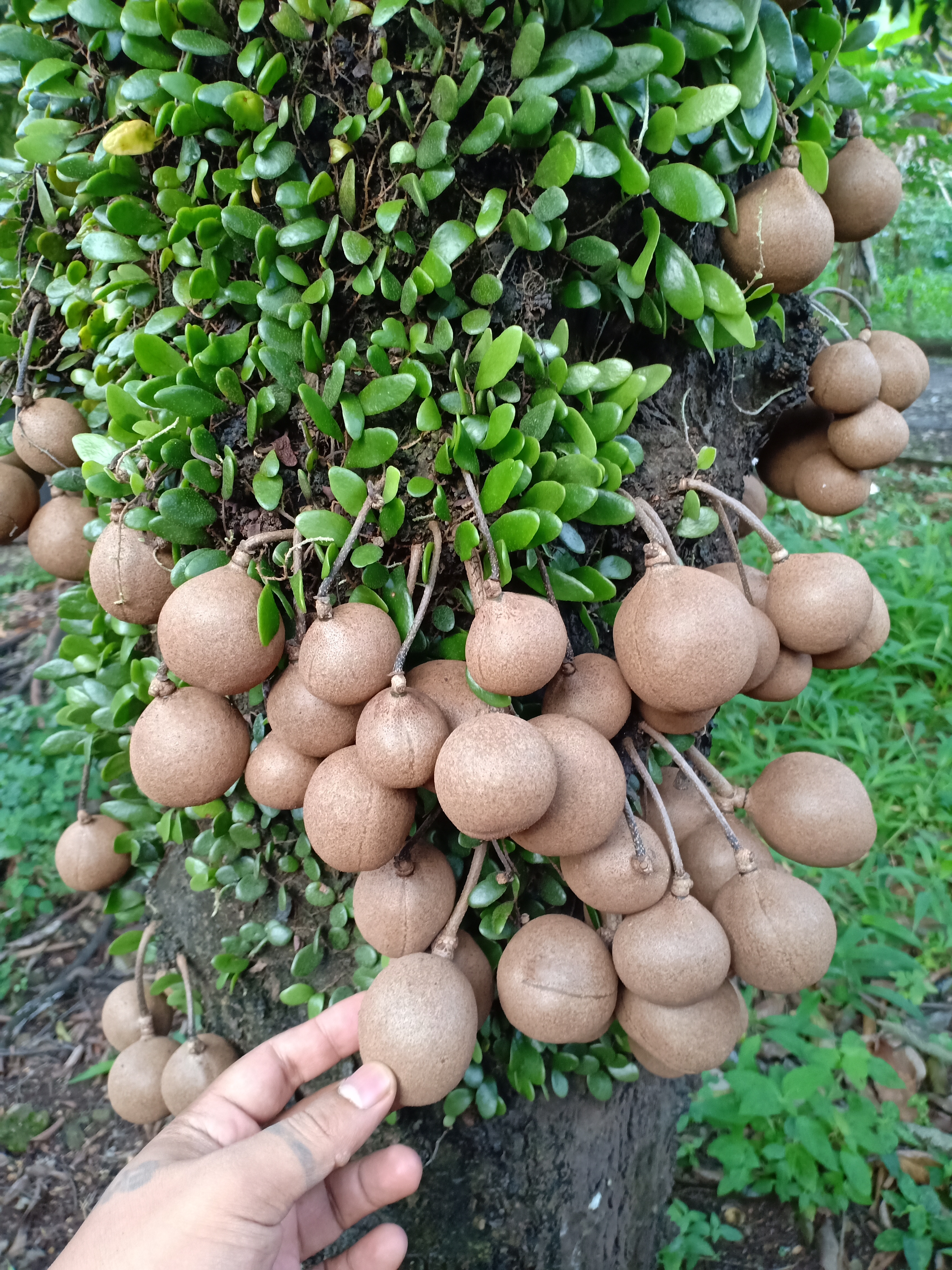

Scientific classification
- Kingdom: Plantae
- Clade: Tracheophytes
- Clade: Angiosperms
- Clade: Magnoliids
- Order: Magnoliales
- Family: Annonaceae
- Genus: Stelechocarpus
- Species: S. burahol

Binomial name
- Stelechocarpus burahol (Blume) Hook.f. & Thomson

Synonyms
- Uvaria burahol Blume; Guatteria toralak Blume; Stelechocarpus burahol var. longiflorus Scheff.

= Stelechocarpus burahol =

Species of plants

Stelechocarpus burahol, commonly known as kepel, is a plant in the custard apple family Annonaceae, native to the humid evergreen forests of Malesia, and known for its edible fruit. It is cultivated only in Java, Indonesia.

== Description ==
Stelechocarpus burahol is a tree growing up to about 25 m (82 ft) tall with a trunk reaching 40 cm (16 in) diameter. It has a conical crown and the bark is dark brown or black and scaly. Leaves are leathery with conspicuous veins, and measure up to 27 cm (11 in) long by 9 cm (3.5 in) wide. New leaves are deep red in colour, and transition through light pink, light green and finally dark green at maturity.

The flowers are borne on the trunk and branches. This species is monoecious, meaning that distinct female and male flowers are borne on the same plants. Male flowers occur on the branches and upper trunk, while female flowers occur on the lower parts (thus the fruit is also produced on the lower parts). Flowers are produced in clusters of 8—16 and are initially pale green, but lose colour as they mature. Male flowers are about 1 cm (0.39 in) wide and female flowers are about 3 cm (1.2 in) wide. The fruit is brown when mature and contains up to 6 seeds.

== Taxonomy ==
This tree was first described as Uvaria burahol by the German botanist Carl Ludwig Blume in 1825, however the British botanists Joseph Dalton Hooker and Thomas Thomson transferred it to their newly created genus Stelechocarpus in 1855, published in their work Flora Indica: Being a Systematic Account of the Plants of British India.

=== Common names ===
In English this plant is known as kepel or kepel apple. In Indonesia it is known as kepel, kecindul, simpol, burahol and turalok.

== Cultivation ==
It is believed that this tree is a "palace tree", and should only be planted near palaces. It can be found at Kraton Ngayogyakarta Hadiningrat (the Royal Palace of Yogyakarta), Taman Mini Indonesia Indah theme park in Jakarta, Taman Kiai Langgeng Magelang (a 28 Ha park in the city of Magelang where rare species are studied) and Bogor Botanical Gardens.

== Culture and uses ==
This species is the identity plant of Daerah Istimewa Jogjakarta. It is a symbol of unity, mental and physical integrity, and also represents hospitality. It has long been used by Indonesian royalty as an oral deodorant, body deodorant, perfume, and as a contraceptive. It is also believed to prevent inflammation of the kidneys. The wood can be made into house tools, the leaves used to lower cholesterol.
