= Shahidabad, Rudbar-e Jonubi =

Shahidabad شهيداباد
- Village
- Location within Iran
- Coordinates: 27°44′47″N 58°35′20″E
- Country: Iran
- Province: Kerman
- County: Rudbar-e Jonubi
- Bakhsh: Jazmurian
- Rural District: Jazmurian

Population (2006)
  - Total: 474
- Time zone: UTC+3:30 (IRST)
  - Summer (DST): UTC+4:30 (IRDT)

Shahidabad (Persian: شهيداباد, also Romanized as Shahīdābād) is a village in Jazmurian Rural District, Jazmurian District, Rudbar-e Jonubi County, Kerman Province, Iran. At the 2006 census, its population was 474, in 91 families.
