= Amal Boura =

Footballer (born 2007)

Personal information
- Date of birth: 25 July 2006 (age 20)
- Place of birth: Lyon, France
- Position: Winger

Team information
- Current team: Monaco

Youth career
- Lyon
- 2023–: Monaco

International career^{‡}
Years	Team	Apps	(Gls)
2025–	Comoros	1	(0)
- ‡ National team caps and goals as of 03:18, 13 June 2025 (UTC)

Amal Boura (born 25 July 2006) is a professional footballer who plays as a winger for the Monaco U19s. Born in France, he plays for the Comoros national team.

== Club career ==
A youth product of Lyon, Boura joined the youth academy of Monaco in 2023. On 22 February 2024, he signed his first professional contract with Monaco until 2027.

== International career ==
Born in France, Boura is of Comorian descent. He was called up to the Comoros national team for a set of matches in June 2025. He made his debut with Comoros in a 4–2 friendly loss to Kosovo on 9 June 2025.
