= Bura (card game) =

Russian card game

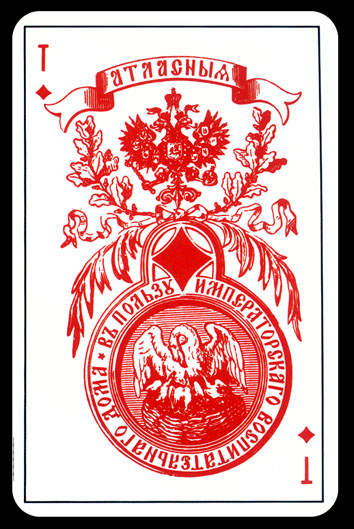
- The ♦A from a Russian pattern pack
- Origin: Russia
- Alternative names: Thirty-One
- Type: Point-trick game
- Players: 2 or 4
- Cards: 36
- Deck: French
- Rank (high→low): A 10 K Q J 9 8 7 6
- Play: Alternate
- Playing time: 30 min
- Features: special combinations, 2 or 3 cards of the same suit may be led.

Bura (Russian: Бура, "cutter") is a Russian ace–ten card game that is "particularly characteristic of Russian prisoners and ex-prisoners. Its alternative name of thirty-one refers to the combination of three trump cards that wins the game. One of the main variants of this game is known as Kozel ("goat") or Bura Kozel. It is a point-trick game with the unusual feature that players may lead several cards of the same suit at once.

== Cards ==
A 36-card, French-suited pack is used. Cards rank in the usual ace–ten order and are worth the usual ace–ten game values: ace (Tuz) 11 points, ten (Desyatka) 10 points, king (Corol) 4 points, queen (Dama) 3 points, jack (Valet) 2 points, remainder 0 points.

== Rules ==
The game is best for two or three; McLeod states that two is normal. The aim is to be the first to take at least 31 points in trick.

First dealer is determined by lots; thereafter the winner of a deal deals for the next. Each player is antes a stake to the pot. The dealer then gives 3 cards, individually, to each player and turns the next for trump. The rest of the stock is placed, face down and crosswise, on top of it. If two play, the non-dealer leads to the first trick; if three play, the player to the dealer's left has this privilege. A card may be beaten by a higher card of the same suit and any plain suit card is beaten by any trump. Suit need not be followed - any card may be played.

A player with two or three cards of the same suit may play them simultaneously and each card must be beaten for a subsequent player to win the cards. There is no requirement to win the trick even if you are able.

The following card combinations, if declared, allow a player to 'steal' the lead:

- Bura ("borer" or "cutter") – any three trumps. Wins immediately.
- Moscow (Moskva) – three aces. Wins immediately. (Note: Unless, presumably, they are three plain suit Aces and an opponent has three trumps.)
- Little Moscow – three sixes including the trump
- Molodka ("young lady") or Pismo ("letter") – three cards of the same plain suit

If any of these occur in the first trick, the cards are redealt without penalty. If two or more players announce declarations at the start of the same trick, the following rules apply:

- Moscow takes precedence over Bura.
- Molodka is outranked by any of the other declarations.
- If two or more have a Molodka, positional priority applies.
- If two or more have a Bura, the player with positional priority leads and whoever wins the trick wins the pot. (Note: Alternatively the trick is not played and the player with more card points wins.)
- In the event of a successful Bura or Moscow, the winner sweeps the pot.

Players replenish their hands from the stock, singly and in clockwise order, beginning with the trick winner. If there are not enough cards in the stock to go around, the stock is not used. A player who draws too many cards or draws cards out of turn has lost.

Play ends when a player claims to have reached 31 or more points. This must be done from memory - players may not examine their tricks. If the claim is true, the winner sweeps the pot; if he is wrong, he must double the pot.

If played for points, one game point is awarded for a win; two to each opponent if someone incorrectly goes out having not scored 31. Game is then 21 (Robber) or 11 (Little Robber).

== Literature ==
- Kazmin, V.D. (2005). Popular Card Games Moscow: Astrel. ISBN 5-17-008687-3
