= Borah =

Borah may refer to:

- Bora (surname), an Assamese surname
- William Borah (1865–1940), an American politician from Idaho
  - Borah Peak, highest point in Idaho
  - Borah High School, a public school in Boise
- Charley Borah (1906–1980), an American athlete
- Borah (dwelling of a witch), a farm near Lamorna, west Cornwall
- Bohras, a subgroup of the Musta'li sect of Isma'ilism
