= Boura, Burkina Faso =

Boura, Burkina Faso may refer to:

- Boura, Boulgou, a village in the Tenkodogo Department of Boulgou Province
- Boura Department, a department of Sissili Province in southern Burkina Faso

== See also ==
- Boura (disambiguation)
