= Shahidabad Rural District (Babol County) =

Rural district in Mazandaran province, Iran

Shahidabad Rural District Persian: دهستان شهيدآباد
- Rural District
- Location within Iran
- Coordinates: 36°25′N 52°33′E
- Country: Iran
- Province: Mazandaran
- County: Babol
- District: Bandpey-e Gharbi
- Established: 1991
- Capital: Shahidabad

Population (2016)
  - Total: 9,182
- Time zone: UTC+3:30 (IRST)

Shahidabad Rural District (Persian: دهستان شهيدآباد) is in Bandpey-e Gharbi District of Babol County, Mazandaran province, Iran. Its capital is the village of Shahidabad.

== Demographics ==
=== Population ===
At the time of the 2006 National Census, the rural district's population was 10,879 in 2,951 households. There were 10,681 inhabitants in 3,374 households at the following census of 2011. The 2016 census measured the population of the rural district as 9,182 in 3,202 households. The most populous of its 11 villages was Shahidabad, with 2,947 people.

=== Other villages in the rural district ===
- Boz Rud Pey
- Firuzabad
- Kahar Kenar-e Keshtali
- Kelagar Sara
- Moallem Kola
- Mowmenabad
- Pat Rud Pey
- Qanbarzadeh
- Salehdar Kola
- Shaneh Tarash
- Shub Kola
- Yazdanabad
