= Shahidabad, Qaleh Ganj =

Shahidabad شهيداباد
- Village
- Interactive map of Shahidabad
- Country: Iran
- Province: Kerman
- County: Qaleh Ganj
- Bakhsh: Central
- Rural District: Sorkh Qaleh

Population (2006)
  - Total: 108
- Time zone: UTC+3:30 (IRST)
  - Summer (DST): UTC+4:30 (IRDT)

Shahidabad (Persian: شهيداباد, also romanized as Shahīdābād) is a village in Sorkh Qaleh Rural District, in the Central District of Qaleh Ganj County, Kerman Province, Iran. At the 2006 census, its population was 108, in 27 families.
