= Siege of Taiz =

Conflicts in and around Taiz, Yemen, in the civil war from 2015–present

Siege of Ta'iz
- Part of the Yemeni Civil War and the Saudi Arabian-led intervention in Yemen
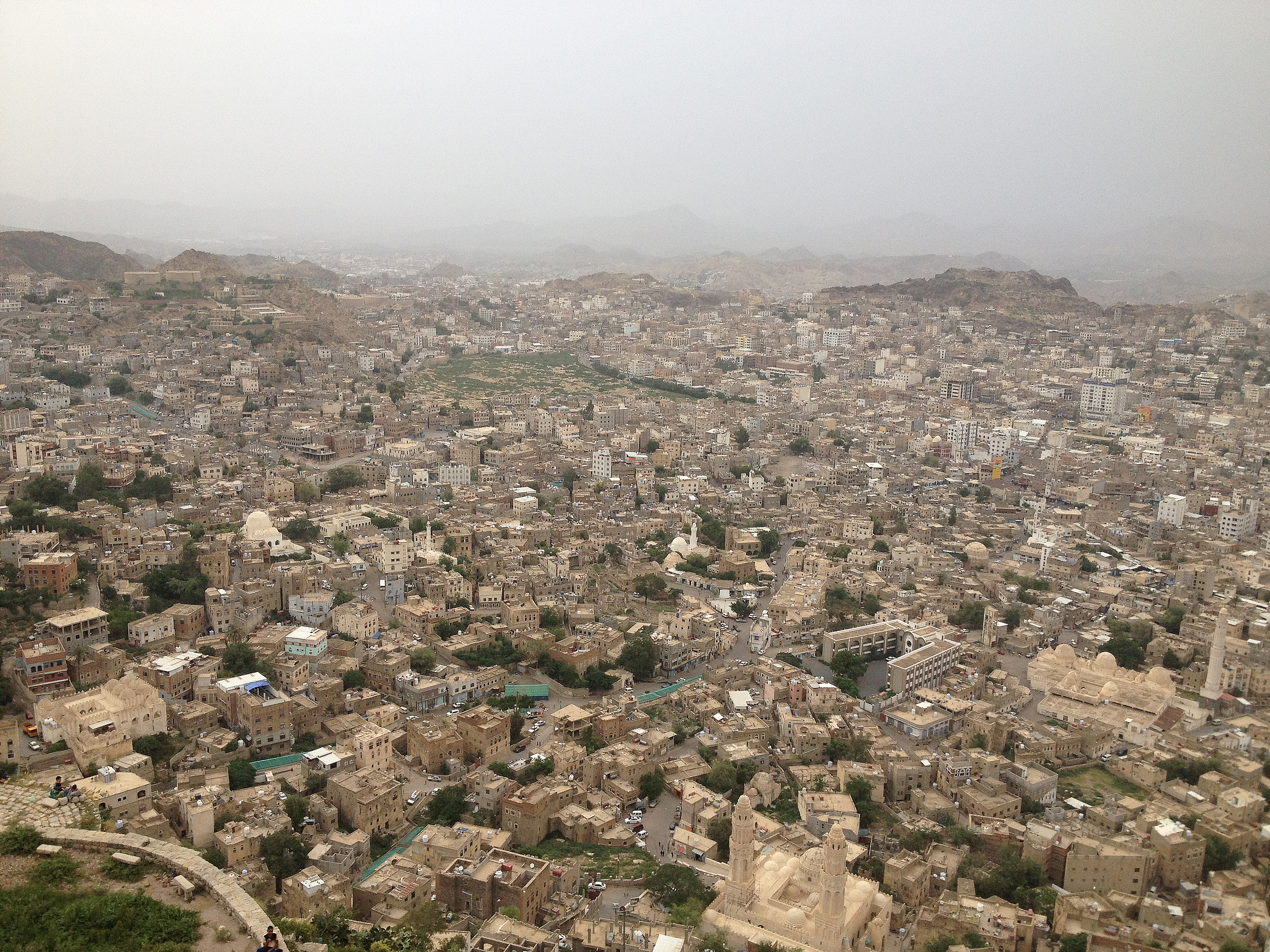
- Aerial view of the city of Taiz
Date	15 April 2015 – present (11 years, 7 months and 4 days)
Location	Taiz Governorate, Yemen 13.58°N 44.02°E
Status	Ongoing: Ceasefire enforced from 11–17 April 2016; broken on 18 April; Houthis capture Southern Taiz; Houthis cut off supply routes between Taiz and Aden; Loyalists retake Mokha and the western Taiz Governorate during Operation Golden Arrow; Loyalists begin new offensive in late January 2020; Siege partially lifted in June 2024; Clashes restart in September 2026; Houthis retake Mokha in mid September 2026; Houthis encircle Taiz in early October 2026

Belligerents
(Yemen) Supreme Revolutionary Committee/Supreme Political Council: Houthi fighters; Security Forces (pro-Saleh) (2015–2017); Republican Guard (2015–2017)	Cabinet of Yemen: Security Forces (pro-Hadi); Islah fighters; People's Committees; Popular resistance; Islamist militias (from late 2015); Arab Coalition: Saudi Arabia (leader); Qatar (2015–17); Bahrain; Egypt; Jordan; Morocco (2015–19); Sudan (2015–19); United Arab Emirates	Al-Qaeda in the Arabian Peninsula: Ansar al-Sharia

Commanders and leaders
Abdu Al Janadi (Houthi Governor of Taiz); Ameen Haydan † (Houthi Deputy Governor of Taiz); Abu Ali Hakim Abdullah al-Houthi (Houthi field commander); Abu Bassam † (Field commander)	(Yemen) Abdulaziz al-Majidi (PLC chief of staff for the Taiz military axis) (Yemen) Major General Ahmed Saif Al Yafei † (Yemeni Armed Forces Deputy Chief of Staff) (Yemen) Ali al-Maamari (Taiz governor-in-exile) (Yemen) Rashad al-Akahali (Taiz deputy governor-on-exile) (Yemen) Major General Khalid Fadhel (Commander of Taiz military region) (Yemen) Mayor Tariq Al-Himiari † (Islah militia leader) (Yemen) Sheikh Hamoud al-Mikhlafi (Popular Resistance commander) (Yemen) Dhia Al Haq (Popular resistance leader in Taiz) (Yemen) Major-General Mohamed al-Awni † (local pro-Hadi commander); Abu al-Abbas (Leader of the Abu al-Abbas brigade) (Saudi Arabia) Col. Abdullah al-Sahyan † (Saudi Special Forces commander) (United Arab Emirates) Mohammed Ali al-Kitbi † (Special forces officer)	Qasim al-Raymi †; Abu al-Zubair al-Adani †; Karim Sarhan †

Strength
More than 30,000	Pro-government forces: 10,000 to 15,000; Salafist militias: 500 members	Unknown

Casualties and losses
- 18,400 killed 29,858 people displaced (in Taiz city only)
- Location within Yemen

The Siege of Taiz is an ongoing military confrontation between opposing Yemeni forces in the city of Taiz for control of the city and surrounding area. The battle began one month after the start of the Yemeni Civil War. The siege was partially lifted on 13 June 2024 with the opening of a key road into Taiz. The siege intensified during the 2026 Yemen offensives when the Houthis encircled Taiz.

== Background ==
Houthi forces backed by troops loyal to Ali Abdullah Saleh, Yemen's influential former president and General People's Congress party head, swept into Taiz on 22 March, capturing the military airport and other key parts of the city. They encountered little resistance, although Houthi gunmen reportedly fired into the air to disperse protests. One demonstrator was killed and five more were injured.

Two days later, five demonstrators were killed by the Houthis and 80 were injured during a protest on 24 March against their presence in the city, while in the city of Al Turba, 80 km to the southwest, three protesters were killed and 12 injured while attacking a Houthi position.

On 11 April 2015, pro-Houthi soldiers and fighters loyal to President Abdrabbuh Mansur Hadi both reportedly mobilised around Taiz, with the 35th Armoured Brigade deploying on the city streets and anti-Houthi militiamen taking up positions north of the city, amid Saudi-led coalition airstrikes in the area. The 22nd Republican Guards Brigade was hit by an airstrike, as was the village of Al-Dhahirah in the Mawiyah District, the next day.

== Chronology ==
=== 2015 ===
By 15 April 2015, Yemeni military sources reported that five pro-Saleh military brigades defected throughout the country, with one of them battling Houthis in the Taiz Governorate.

Airstrikes pounded Republican Guard and Houthi military positions in and around Taiz on 17 April 2015. A government official in Taiz told Xinhua News Agency that the airstrikes had caused dozens of injuries and virtually destroyed Taiz's infrastructure, as well as the military bases they struck.

Between 17 and 18 April 2015, at least 30 people were killed when Houthi gunmen, supported by the elite Republican Guard, assaulted the headquarters of the 35th Armoured Army Brigade, which had declared its loyalty to Hadi. The dead included 8–16 pro-Hadi and 14–19 Houthi fighters, as well as three civilians. Another report put the number of dead at 85. On the morning of 19 April, 10 more Houthi and four pro-Hadi fighters were killed.

On 22 April 2015, Houthi forces captured the pro-Hadi brigade's military base in Taiz. An airstrike was conducted against the base shortly after its capture. 10 pro-Hadi soldiers were killed in the battle for the base.

Four days later, residents reported that pro-Hadi forces had captured several city districts from the Houthis. Fighting was heaviest around government and security buildings in the city center, with some 20 civilians killed. After the local Al-Thawra hospital was hit, the WHO put the death toll at 19 civilians.

Fighting broke out in Taiz on 16 May, despite a five-day ceasefire agreed to by the Houthis, military factions, and Saudi-led coalition. At least a dozen civilians and a number of fighters on both sides were killed.

On 24 July, airstrikes targeted two residential complexes belonging to engineers and technicians of al-Mukha power plant of Taiz province.

Situation in Ta'izz, mid-July 2015

By 5 August 2015, pro-Hadi forces at Ta'izz had received reinforcements from the south, allowing them to capture 75% of Ta'izz.

On 16 August 2015, only days after a large-scale pro-Hadi offensive in southern Yemen, pro-Hadi forces, backed by Saudi airstrikes, recaptured most of the city of Ta'izz. However, Houthis managed to reverse loyalist gains, capturing a number of strategic positions of Al-Salih Gardens, along with areas of the Al-Dabab Mountain region after weeks of losses, while Hadi loyalists attributed the retreat to lack of military equipment, compared to Houthi forces in the area who enjoyed an advantage in terms of supplies.

Fourteen civilians were killed and 70 wounded on 22 October due to shelling by Houthis and pro-government forces.

Saudi Arabian Colonel Abdullah al-Sahian and Emirati Colonel Mohammed Ali al-Kitbi, who were operating in the Taiz area, were killed in a rocket strike by Houthi militiamen on 14 December 2015. They were some of the senior-most officers of the Saudi-led coalition killed in the war.

=== 2016 ===
BBC reported on February 22 that video footage had emerged showing members of Al Qaeda in the Arabian Peninsula (AQAP) fighting in the battle alongside pro-Hadi fighters. The pro-Hadi coalition of Sunni governments has however denied co-operating with the extremists. According to humanitarian organizations, 58 civilians, and 269 others were injured in February by the fighting in Taiz.

On 12 March, pro-government fighters made significant progress in Taiz, by capturing several districts, and government buildings and ousted many Houthi fighters from the area.

On 17 March, humanitarian aid arrived in the recaptured part of Taiz.

On 19 March, Houthi fighters attacked pro-Hadi fighters in the recaptured part of the city. Yemeni security and medical officials said 35 fighters had been killed in clashes between Shiite rebels and pro-government forces in Taiz. The officials said that Houthis were trying to retake the western part of the city, while the Saudi-led coalition launched more than a dozen airstrikes to prevent Houthis from advancing.

On 22 March, at least 39 Houthis were killed and dozens injured when Houthis recaptured Taiz from pro-government forces. Over the weekend, at least 55 people, including civilians, were killed in two days of intense fighting in and around the city.

On 24 March, Houthis escalated their offensive by recapturing the lost part of Taiz and some strategic roads that lead to Aden. The Houthis built walls to prevent the Hadi loyalists' reinforcements from arriving in the city. Meanwhile, 13 trucks carrying humanitarian aid, arrived in the part of Taiz recaptured by the government.

On 25 March, according to reports, 14 civilians were killed by the Saudi-led coalition inside the Houthi held part of Taiz.

Houthi forces and allied forces loyal to former president Saleh seized control of the center of Al Wazi'iyah District in southwestern Taiz governorate on April 1.

A ceasefire in Taiz was agreed upon by the opposing forces and enforced on 11 April. One violation was reported by residents and local journalists who said that the Houthis shelled residential areas and a military base after midnight.

On 17 April, an agreement was reached between the Houthis and the loyalists to reinforce the ceasefire on all fronts in the city.

==== Post-ceasefire and renewed clashes ====
On 18 April, Houthi militias and forces loyal to ousted president Ali Abdullah Saleh continued to bomb residential neighborhoods in the city of Taiz and the opening of the eastern and western ports of the city, despite the signing of a truce agreement on a day before. The official Yemeni news agency quoted a local Yemeni source as saying, "Violent explosions were heard last night on more than one front, while the two eastern exits leading to Sanaa and the western one leading to Al Hudaydah were shut down and sieged by the Houthis." The Media Bureau of the Popular Resistance in Taiz has recorded more than 16 violations committed by the coup militias, which included bombing of military bases, resistance sites, and residential neighbourhoods during the agreed truce timeline.

6 people; including 1 pro-government fighter and 5 Houthi fighters were killed on 9 May during shelling by both Houthis and pro-government forces.

MSF reported on June 3 that a rocket fired on a crowded market had killed 6 people and injured 18. However it was later reported on 6 June that the rocket attack had killed 12 people and left more than 122 injured, a number much higher than the previous reported number. Two rocket attacks on 6 June killed a woman and injured her three children. 45 people including three civilians were killed by the same day in two days of fighting.

On 18 June, the warring parties exchanged 194 prisoners with 118 being Houthi fighters and the other 78 being pro-government fighters. 13 people were killed during clashes on 22 June. A mortar fired by Houthis in central Taiz killed 5 people and wounded 5 others. 2 pro-government fighters were killed and 8 others were injured in fighting in western Taiz according to Abdel Aziz al-Majedi who also claimed that scores of Houthi fighters were killed and injured and number of them were captured.

On 26 June, the Houthis captured the base of Brigade 35, Also known as "Al-Qasr Camp" after a week long battle

On 3 July, during the morning hours, Yemeni popular committees and Houthi fighters managed to capture a strategic military site in the Haifan District of the Ta'iz Governorate after fierce clashes against Coalition-backed Hadi forces.

On 8 July, a Saudi-led Coalition airstrike targeted a gathering of Houthi fighters in Mocha town, killing 17 and wounding dozens others.

On July 25, the pro-Hadi militias captured a mountain area near Taiz.

On July 27, Yemeni army and Al-Islah militias took control of the Sarari village, and reportedly found an Iranian training camp there.

A mosque of a Sufi saint was blown up by the Salafist militias on 29 July.

By August 2016 Houthis had captured the Hayfan district, thus capturing southern Taiz completely. This victory put them in a position to cut the Taiz-Lahij road and brought them near Tor al-Baha. The Saudi Arabia-led coalition conducted airstrikes and raids against Houthis in the governorate with clashes between Houthis and pro-government forces reported in Al-Silw district.

On August 9, 2016, 11 civilians, including seven children, were killed by an anti-vehicle mine in Al Wazi'iyah, which is located in the western part of Taizz province.

On 16 August, the Houthi militias and forces loyal to Ali Abdullah Saleh cut off the last supply routes between Taiz and government-controlled Aden.

On 18 August, pro-government troops launched an offensive on Houthis to break their siege around Taiz. Pro-government sources claimed troops had captured several areas east and west of the city.

Houthis cut off the last supply route of pro-Hadi fighters to Aden on 20 August. The pro-government forces claimed to have partially broken the siege on the city later in the day after capturing the Han mountain.

Situation in Ta'izz, mid-August 2016

On 22 August, Yemeni military sources claimed 11 Houthi fighters were killed during clashes near western entrance of Taiz while 2 Houthi fighters were killed during an airstrike by the Saudi Arabia-led coalition at the northern entrance of Taiz. At least 15 civilians were reported on 28 August to have been killed when Saudi jets carried out airstrikes on a minibus carrying them.

6 civilians were killed in As Silw district on 12 September when a Katyusha rocket fired by pro-Houthi fighters landed on their home.

On 14 September, pro-government sources stated that 5 Houthi fighters were killed when the Houthis launched an offensive on the mountainous Khabub area.

On 15 September, pro-Houthi forces stated that 27 Houthi fighters and 13 pro-government fighters were killed during clashes around Taiz. It is also reported that 200,000 civilians were caught up in the fighting in Taiz.

On 30 September, a top Houthi commander, Abu Nasr Alkhawlany along with eight of his companions had been reportedly killed by a coalition-staged raid in Alrawd village, located west of Taiz.

On 3 October, at least 10 civilians have been killed in a rocket attack in Beir al-Basha district in Taiz.

On the evening of 25 October, the head of the Houthi's missile operations Mohammed Nasser Al-Kaait, was killed by a Saudi coalition airstrike in the Marran area of the Taiz province.

On 26 October, a senior Houthi military operative, Abu Majed, was killed along with a number of other fighters in west of the city of Taiz.

On 30 October, at least 18 civilians were killed in a Saudi-led coalition air raid in As Silw District.

On 2 November, at least 28 Houthi fighters and six government loyalists were killed during clashes in the Taiz city. Abd Hamoud, the commander of pro-government tribesmen, said that they are trying to take control of hilly locations that overlook Taiz Al Rahida road that links the city with Aden.

On 13 November, pro-government forces said seven Houthi militants were killed and three others injured in clashes across in a statement. Meanwhile, two civilians were reportedly killed and two others injured when Houthi rebels shelled a residential district in eastern Taiz.

On 15 November, at least 20 Houthi fighters were killed during clashes in Taiz. Pro-government troops backed by allied tribesmen launched a major push to drive Houthi out of Taiz and took control of the Saleh district that overlooks the presidential palace. Government forces announced they had liberated the western side of the city and announced partially breaking Houthi siege. A Houthi field commander known as Abu Bassam was reportedly killed in the clashes.

==== 17 November US-brokered ceasefire ====
On 17 November, at least 21 civilians were killed and 76 wounded after the shelling of a busy market in Taiz. Witnesses said the attack on the market took place in an area under Houthi control. It was not immediately clear who fired at the market. On the same day, sources also confirmed that loyalists were able to retake complete control of parts of eastern Taiz. Pro-government fighters were able to regain control of Al-Jehmaliah town. 15 Houthi fighters and 9 pro-government fighters were killed in clashes during the night on 20 November. The ceasefire ended on the next day with the Saudi Arabia-led coalition stating it won't be repeated due to repeated violations. Pro-government fighters also attacked Houthis in western outskirts of the city on the same day, targeting an air defence base.

==== Continued clashes ====
On 22 November, eleven Houthi rebels and five government soldiers were killed on the outskirts of Taiz, officials said, when government forces repelled an attack by the Houthis. The attack which began late in the day before, targeted al-Dhabab area, which provides pro-Hadi forces with their only access to Taiz, which is surrounded by the rebels. Warplanes from the Saudi-led coalition also took part in defensive operations and repelling the Houthi attack.

On 24 November, at least ten members of the Houthi militia and their allies were killed in clashes with pro-government forces in Taiz. "Yemen's national army repulsed an attack by Houthi militiamen and their allies on an air-defense camp in western Taiz," Colonel Abdu al-Saghir, leader of the army's 17th Division, was quoted as saying to Anadolu Agency. He also claimed that pro-government forces had not sustained any losses and managed to recapture the two hills of Al-Sawda and Al-Khalwa in the city.

On 26 November, government forces thwarted a Houthi attack on a military post in eastern Taiz, killing 11 Houthis and injuring scores. A pro-government fighter was killed and 11 others were injured in the clashes pro-government forces said in a statement. Meanwhile, two civilians were reportedly killed when Houthis shelled a residential neighborhood in central Taiz. On 28 November, pro-government forces repelled a Houthi attack in al Dhabab area of Taiz. Pro-government forces sent reinforcements on 3 December to secure the Red Sea Coast including Dhubab from Houthis.

Saudi-owned Al-Arabiya stated on 5 December that Saudi-led coalition aircraft bombed boats allegedly loaded with weapons that were being smuggled to Houthi militias off the coast of Mocha and Dhubab, situated in western Taiz. Yemen's Saba News Agency however stated that the boat was actually carrying Pakistani fishermen, 6 of whom were killed in the airstrike. Pro-government forces repelled an attack by Houthis at Taiz on 6 December. They also claimed to have seized several residential positions in eastern Taiz. The coalition carried out several airstrikes targeting Houthi positions on 9 December, destroying some of their weapon caches.

Army commanders claimed on 12 December that 18 Houthi fighters were killed in clashes on various fronts around the city, mainly on its eastern edges. On 22 December, fighting in northern Taiz city left 14 Houthis and eight pro-government fighters dead per military sources.

=== 2017 ===
On 1 January, four civilians, including three children, were killed when Houthis bomb targeted residential areas in Taiz city, a local official and medical sources said.

On 18 January, Houthi fired mortar shells landed on Al-Nour district, west of Taiz, which killed at least nine civilians and wounded eight.

==== Operation Golden Arrow ====
Map of the siege of Taiz within southwestern Yemen as of Spring 2017.

On 5 January, fighting erupted when Houthis launched a fresh offensive to take control of several locations on the western and eastern edges of the city. At least 20 people including a primary school student were killed and dozens injured in two days of fighting, and army commanders said. Neither two sides make gains during the fighting. The Houthis and their allies also launched an assault near the Bab-el-Mandeb strait, with both pro-Houthi and pro-government sources stating that they killed a number of soldiers. Meanwhile, the Saudi-led coalition conducted airstrikes against sites affiliated with them in southwestern Taiz, with local sources reporting destruction of several military vehicles belonging to them as well as at least one rocket platform. Since then, at least 55 Houthis have been killed in fighting and 72 others wounded, military and medical sources said.

On 8 January, at least 68 fighters have been killed in two days of fierce battles between Yemeni forces and Houthi rebels near the strategic Bab al-Mandab strait, military officials said. Clashes since 7 January have also killed 13 loyalists forces, including an army general, Brigadier-General Abdul Aziz al-Majidi, a loyalist commander. a senior army commander told Gulf News that pro-government forces completely liberated the Dhubab District as it pushed ahead towards other nearby regions.

On 9 January, Abdo Abdullah Majili, a spokesman for the Yemeni army, said that government troops had flushed out Houthis from Al Mansoura mountain in Al Waziya.

On 10 January, pro-government forces claimed they have recaptured Al-Owaid and Al-Nuba mountains in Maqbanah District from the Houthis which is considered strategically important as they both overlook the main road linking the provinces of Taiz and Hudeida.

On 15 January, pro-government forces are "on the verge" of taking control of Al Jadeed region, killing dozens of Houthis in heavy clashes during the process. A pro-Hadi commander also said that only 16 percent of Taiz province is still under Houthi control.

On 21 and 22 January, at least 52 Houthi fighters and its allied troops were killed in Saudi coalition airstrikes in Mocha. Houthis said they have killed 14 pro-government soldiers.

On 23 January, pro-government forces claimed to have captured the key port town of Mocha from Houthi fighters.

On 24 January, at least 28 Houthis and 12 pro-government fighters have been killed in fighting in the past 24 hours, military and medical sources said. Clashes continued on the day on the southern and eastern outskirts of Mocha town. A military official also said that Houthis are still in control of the centre of the town. In the same day, unknown militants detonated explosives targeting the Political Security Organization (PSO) building in Taizz, Yemen, leaving only material damages.

On 1 February, military and medical sources said 25 Houthi fighters and six pro-government soldiers were killed during clashes in Mocha.

On 7 February, Emirates News Agency reported that Yemeni pro-government forces backed by Saudi coalition troops had secured Mocha. This report was contradicted by other sources.

On 8 February, twenty-four Houthis fighters and eight loyalist troops were killed in fighting in Mocha.

On 10 February, a loyalist military source confirmed that pro-government forces were in "full control" of Mocha town.

On 22 February, 18 pro-government soldiers and 21 Houthis fighters were killed in clashes on the outskirts of Mocha town. At least another 50 fighters from both sides were also wounded in the fighting, according to a military source.

On 23 February, seven pro-government troops and 16 Houthis fighters were killed during fighting around Mocha. Twelve soldiers and 28 Houthis fighters were also wounded. Pro-government sources said that government forces are now battling the Houthi forces on the edges of Khalid Bin Walid military camp, east of Mocha town.

On 6 March, clashes between the Houthis and loyalists near Mocha left six Houthi fighters dead, said a medical official and a military source.

On 11 March, seven Yemeni soldiers and eight Houthis fighters were killed in heavy fighting over the past 24 hours near Mocha, medical and security sources said.

On 16 March, a Yemeni coast guard ship was struck by a mine near Mocha, killing two service members and wounding eight others, officials said. It is unclear whether the mine was planted by the Houthis.

On 18 March, loyalist sources said at least 45 Houthi militants were killed after Saudi coalition air raid targeted their convoy near the town of Burj, west of Taiz. Among those killed was a senior Houthi militia figure named Amin al-Humaidan. On the same day, the Houthi-appointed governor of Taiz, Abdu Al Janadi and senior Houthi field commander, Abo Ali Al Ahakim, narrowly survived death while dozens of their guards were killed in the attack in the Burah region of Maqbanah District, local activists and media reports said. Among those killed in the attack was the Houthi-appointed deputy governor of Taiz, Ameen Haydan.

On 20 March, at least 11 Houthi militiamen and three pro-government military personnel were killed in clashes in the village of Al-Sayar, southeastern Taiz province, according to a statement issued by the pro-Hadi Yemeni army.

On 11 April, security and military official say loyalist forces launched an attack the day before on Houthis around Mocha, which more than 40 pro-government soldiers, Houthis and civilians were killed during the past 24 hours.

On 12 April, an army source said 16 Houthi fighters and four pro-government soldiers were killed during armed confrontations in Mocha within the past 24 hours.

On 15 April, at least 25 soldiers and Houthi fighters have died in clashes around the Khaled Ibn Al-Walid base when loyalist forces launched an assault to seize it, military and medical sources said.

On 19 April, a military source says that 17 Houthi militia members were killed and 20 others were wounded when Saudi jets bombed Houthi positions north of Mocha.

On 26 April, at least nine Houthi fighters were killed and more than 14 injured in airstrikes carried out by Saudi-led air coalition Al-Waziyya and Mawza districts of western Taiz, according to a Yemeni military source.

On 3 May, Houthi-led forces renewed their assault on the western port city of Mocha, inflicting casualties upon Saudi-backed forces. One soldier of the United Arab Emirates and 8 soldiers of the Aden-based government were killed in clashes on the coast of Taiz province.

On 8 May, six Houthis were killed and several others were injured when pro-government soldiers shelled al-Waash mountain, northwest of Taiz. Meanwhile, a pro-Hadi military source said that pro-government army forces attacked Houthis' posts in the western outskirts of Khaled bin al-Walid camp and in the Mokha junction, killing at least 10 Houthis.

On 11 May, Republican Guard and Houthis launched a barrage of artillery shells on the gatherings of Sudanese soldiers at Nabizah mountain in northern part of Mawzaa district in Taiz province. According to the sources, a lot of soldiers were injured, while their commander was reportedly killed. Two Sudanese soldiers died in the attack.

On 24 May 2017, pro-government forces captured Yemeni central bank branch in east of Taiz and seized neighboring buildings near the People's Palace, after fierce fighting.

On 26 May, at least 20 Houthi militants and their allies were killed in clashes in Taiz province, according to loyalist spokesman. Meanwhile, Houthis reported an air attack in western Taiz left three journalists dead and 27 civilians wounded.

On 29 May, loyalist forces stormed into the Republican Palace. Yemeni civilian sources confirmed that at least 18 Houthis were killed in the fierce clashes since pro-government forces retook strategic areas near the Republican Palace in Taiz.

On 3 June, fighting between Houthi and pro-government troops left about 30 people killed and scores others injured in Taiz, said a military official.

On 13 June, Houthis fired a missile at an Emirati ship leaving Mocha port near the Bab al-Mandab strait, injuring a crewman.

On 9 July, Saudi-led warships based near Mocha port bombarded several Houthis held positions in Hamli and Khaled Bin-Walid military bases in western Taiz province. Medical sources in the area confirmed that the shelling targeted the Houthi-controlled sites resulted in the killing 15 Houthi fighters and injuring more than 20 others.

On 12 July, two pro-government Islamist groups who rivaled each other clashed in Jamal Street, Taiz. Six gunmen were killed from both sides and several civilians were left injured at the scene, a local medical source said.

On 18 July, at least 20 civilians, including women and children from the same family, have been killed in a Saudi coalition air attack, west of Taiz city.

On 1 August, three government soldiers and eight Houthis fighters were killed in Taiz province, according to a pro-government commander.

=== 2018 ===
Map of southwestern Yemen as of Summer 2018.

On January 28, 2018 pro-Hadi force made gains on the western and eastern edges of Taiz. Pro-Hadi media said 50 Houthis fighters were killed in two days' battle and Hadi government forces pushed to take control of two strategic roads linking Taiz with Hodeida and Ibb provinces, two major supply routes for Houthi militants.

On 11 March, it was reported that a military vehicle belonging to loyalist was destroyed in the western coast by a guided missile and its crew members were killed. Reportedly, Houthis snipers units killed three loyalists in the north of Yakhtal area and the Houthis fighters clashed with Saudi-backed gunmen in Maqbanah area. The Houthis fighters destroyed a military vehicle of the Saudi-led coalition's gunmen in the south of Khaled camp, as well as shelling pro-Hadi force gathering in the west of the camp. On April 26, suspected Abu Abbas Brigade militants, shelled residential areas in Mount Sabr district, Taizz, killing a civilian. Months later, militants attacked military police forces guarding the Al Thawrah hospital in Taizz city, Taizz, leaving an unknown number of attackers killed, 4 soldiers, and 10 wounded.

In May 2018, thousands of troops from Tehami resistance, the Giant Brigades and the National Resistance forces led by General Tareq Saleh launched a massive offensive on key towns and mountains west of Taiz, it was reported that their end goal is to cut a path northward towards the Red Sea port city of Al Hudaydah, a stronghold and the last major port of Houthis. On 10 May, pro-government force captured the centre of Mouza district west of the southern city of Taiz. On 11 May, backed by massive air support from the Saudi-led coalition, the pro-government Giants Brigades stormed Al Ameri military camp west of the city of Taiz and took control of it later. Meanwhile, Al Wazyia district was also captured by loyalists. Pro-Hadi media claimed that 133 Houthis militants surrendered to the loyalists after they were besieged in Al Waziyah district. On 15 May, 30 Houthis fighters surrendered to government forces in the Jabal Habashy district on the western edges of Taiz.

=== 2019 ===
In 2019, the war continues, but a prisoner swap was carried out across the front line in Taiz on December 19, 2019. This swap released 75 affiliates of the internationally recognized government, along with 60 affiliated with the Houthis.

A member of the Sudanese Armed Forces was kidnapped on April 3, in the district of Mukha. Hours later the soldier was found dead, and the attack is attributed by the Al-Amaliqah Brigades. On April 19, terrorists opened fire on a police patrol in Al-Jomhouri, Taizz, killing a senior security officer. The next day, a sniper shot dead a civilian in Taizz. Days later, suspected Abu Abbas Brigade militants clashed with security forces members, in Jumhuri, Taizz, Yemen, leaving a civilian killed and eight other wounded in the ensuing clashes.

=== 2020 ===
The frontline of the battle has solidified into a scar across the city, running from east to west, and vegetation has grown in the no-man's land.

On 5 April, at least 5 women were killed and 28 people injured when shelling hit the woman's section of Taiz's main prison. The shelling came from the part of the divided city controlled by the Houthis.

On 8 April, Saudi-led coalition spokesman Turki Al-Maliki announced a two-week ceasefire in view of the COVID-19 pandemic. Saudi vice defence minister Prince Khalid bin Salman tweeted that Saudi Arabia would contribute $500 million to the U.N. humanitarian response plan for Yemen in 2020 and another $25 million to help combat the spread of the coronavirus. On 7 August 2020, militants ambushed Mohamed Salem al-Kholani, the Taizz Military Police commander in Jabal Habashy district, Taizz. The attack left three of his bodyguards wounded, and the commander result unharmed.

=== 2021 ===
On 3 March, pro-Hadi forces launched an offensive in Taiz to relieve the pressure in Marib. They managed to attack and capture Houthi positions in Salah valley, east of Taiz city. The attack left 15 Houthi fighters killed, a pro-Hadi Yemeni army officer reported.

On 8 March, pro-Hadi forces fully captured the rural district of Jabal Habashi from Houthi forces. The fighting had reached Maqbanah district. The pro-Hadi Taiz media center claimed that 70 Houthi fighters had been either killed or injured during the battle without details on pro-Hadi forces losses. By 11 March, Houthi forces withdrew from Kadhah and Ghabari mountain after assault by National Resistance Forces from the west and Hadi forces from the east.

On 11 March, pro-Hadi forces advanced against the Houthi fighters in the southwestern province of Taiz, reopening a new road to Taiz city and joining the joint forces in the western coast.

On 12 March, pro-Hadi Yemeni army source reported new gains against Houthi forces in Al-Hinna area between Mauza'a and al-Wazi'ea districts. "These wins will lead to the reopening of some sub-roads connecting al-Houjaria districts to the western coast, and pave way for advance towards the strategic town of al-Barh located between Maqbana and Mocha districts", the source added.

By 26 March, Houthi forces repelled continued pro-Hadi forces assaults and overran localities east of Ahkum, edging closer to the Taiz-Aden Road.

=== 2022 ===
The city of Taiz remained under a blockade by the Houthis in 2022. Few safe roads out of the city remained for civilians, and human rights groups advocated for the Houthis to lift the blockade to allow for humanitarian goods to arrive.

- On 29 August 2022, Yemen's government said ten government soldiers were killed in an overnight rebel attack near the blockaded city of Taiz, during what it called a "dangerous escalation". The Yemeni army said 23 rebels were killed and 30 others were injured in the attack, without providing further details. The government said the assault was aimed at cutting off a key route to the city.
- On 5 November 2022, the military of the Yemeni government said, three Houthi rebels were killed in an attack by government forces in the southwestern Taiz province.
- On 16 November 2022, Abdul Basit Al-Baher, a Yemeni military official in Taiz, told Arab News that the Houthis shelled an air defense military base in northwest Taiz before sending ground troops to attack the base. On 17 November, a military official told Xinhua, intense battles erupted between Yemen's government forces and the Houthi rebels in various areas of the southwestern governate of Taiz leaving four government soldiers and six Houthi fighters dead.

=== 2026 ===
After a crucial humanitarian corridor was opened in June 2024 and restrictions were temporarily loosened, the security situation sharply worsened during the 2026 Yemen offensives. Houthi forces tightened their positions around the regional capital and retook the strategic Red Sea port town of Mokha during a broad military operation across the Taiz Governorate in early September 2026. Taiz was completely surrounded by Houthi forces by early October 2026, cutting off the last southern overland supply route that connected the city to Aden, the temporary capital of the government.

==== Humanitarian crisis and war crimes ====
For the estimated one million people living in the city, the renewed blockade caused a serious humanitarian crisis. As medical facilities, including the Yemeni-Swedish Hospital, faced severe shortages of fuel, oxygen, and working infant incubators, UN High Commissioner for Human Rights Volker Türk urgently demanded immediate access for humanitarian relief, warning of an impending catastrophe. Human rights observers and local government representatives stated that the city was experiencing active famine due to the complete prohibition of clean water and cooking gas. Late October 2026 witnessed a further escalation of hostilities when Yemeni government authorities accused Houthi forces of employing prohibited chemical agents during artillery bombardments, prompting official appeals to the Organisation for the Prohibition of Chemical Weapons (OPCW) for an independent international probe.

According to HRW, tightened Houthi siege on the city—which blocks the entry of food, safe drinking water, fuel, and medicine—may amount to the war crime of using starvation as a method of warfare. Several child deaths were reported during the ongoing siege, among them was Gaza Ali Abdulmughni, an infant who died on 10 November 2026 after her family was reportedly prevented from transporting her to a hospital for emergency medical treatment, according to local sources, Houthi forces opened fire on their vehicle, preventing it from reaching in time.

== Destruction of heritage ==
On 29 July 2016, Salafist gunmen blew up the 16th-century Sheikh Abdulhadi as-Soudi Mosque housing the mausoleum where the remains of the mosque's namesake and some other Sufi saints were entombed. On 12 May 2015, a Saudi-led airstrike in Taiz city targetted the 3000-years old Al-Qahira castle, in which Houthi fighters were sheltering, causing significant damage to the building. On 28 August 2018, the castle was reopened.

== See also ==
- Yemeni revolution
- Battle of Taiz
