= 2016 Al Anad Air Base missile attack =

2016 Alanad Air Base missile attack
- Part of Yemeni Civil War (2014–present)
Date	31 January 2016
Location	Al Anad Air Base, Lahij Governorate, Yemen
Result	Houthi victory

Belligerents
Houthis	Yemen; Supported by: Arab Coalition: Saudi Arabia; United Arab Emirates; Sudan; United States; Academi PMCs

Commanders and leaders
	(United States) Col. Nicholas Petros † (Academi Leader in Yemen)

Casualties and losses
None	(Saudi Arabia) (Sudan) 200 killed or wounded

The Al Anad Air Base missile attack was a strike carried out by the pro-Saleh Yemeni Army and Houthi militants with a ballistic missile against a military camp in the Al Anad Air Base that was being used by troops of the Saudi-led coalition, in Lahij Governorate.

== Attack ==
Yemeni military loyal to and Houthi fighters targeted the Al Anad Air Base with a Tochka ballistic missile, the strike inflicted numerous casualties on the coalition forces including Academi mercenaries. Reports said that there were over 200 casualties in the camp, including the new leader of Academi in Yemen US Colonel Nicholas Petros.

== Aftermath ==
Houthi forces launched another attack on Alanad Air Base in 2019 using drones.
