= Khvosh Rud Rural District =

Rural district in Mazandaran province, Iran

Khvosh Rud Rural District Persian: دهستان خوش رود
- Rural District
- Location within Iran
- Coordinates: 36°18′N 52°31′E
- Country: Iran
- Province: Mazandaran
- County: Babol
- District: Bandpey-e Gharbi
- Established: 1987
- Capital: Khush Rudpey

Population (2016)
  - Total: 11,309
- Time zone: UTC+3:30 (IRST)

Khvosh Rud Rural District (Persian: دهستان خوش رود) is in Bandpey-e Gharbi District of Babol County, Mazandaran province, Iran. It is administered from the city of Khush Rudpey.

== Demographics ==
=== Population ===
At the time of the 2006 National Census, the rural district's population was 11,758 in 3,143 households. There were 11,878 inhabitants in 3,551 households at the following census of 2011. The 2016 census measured the population of the rural district as 11,309 in 3,803 households. The most populous of its 71 villages was Diva Malekshah, with 1,868 people.

=== Other villages in the rural district ===
- Bala Bura
- Kam Kola
- Kardi Kola
- Lamsu Kola-ye Gharbi
- Mian Bura
- Pari Kola
