= Bandpey-e Gharbi District =

District in Mazandaran province, Iran

Bandpey-e Gharbi District Persian: بخش بندپی غربی
- District
- Location within Iran
- Coordinates: 36°20′N 52°31′E
- Country: Iran
- Province: Mazandaran
- County: Babol
- Established: 1991
- Capital: Khush Rudpey

Population (2016)
  - Total: 26,233
- Time zone: UTC+3:30 (IRST)

Bandpey-e Gharbi District (Persian: بخش بندپی غربی) is in Babol County, Mazandaran province, Iran. Its capital is the city of Khush Rudpey.

== Demographics ==
=== Population ===
At the time of the 2006 National Census, the district's population was 25,577 in 6,886 households. The following census in 2011 counted 25,876 people in 7,938 households. The 2016 census measured the population of the district as 26,233 inhabitants in 8,911 households.

=== Administrative divisions ===
Bandpey-e Gharbi District Population
Administrative Divisions	2006	2011	2016
Khvosh Rud RD	11,758	11,878	11,309
Shahidabad RD	10,879	10,681	9,182
Khush Rudpey (city)	2,940	3,317	5,742
Total	25,577	25,876	26,233
RD = Rural District
