= At Turbah =

Town in Yemen

Coordinates: 13°12′46″N 44°07′27″E

At Turbah (alternatively, Turbat Dhubhan) is a town near the coast of the Red Sea in Taiz Governorate, Yemen. It lies about 75 km from Taiz and is about 1,800 metres above sea level. Its population in 2004 was 10,505. By 4 October 2026, the city was captured by the Houthis.

== Etymology and history ==
The name Turbah in Semitic means 'ancient cemetery', in reference to the bones of the ancestors mixing with the soil. Various places are named Turbah or Al Turbah. Turbat Dhubhan became known as Al-Turbah after its urbanization as a regional capital during the Ottoman era.

=== Karib 'il Watar campaign ===
Karib'il campaigns against Awsan

The Sabaean King Karib'il Watar sacked Dhubhan in his 7th century BC campaigns.

=== Center of the Zurayid rump state ===
Dhubhan, Dimloa, Yumain & Munif were listed among the last citadels surrendered by the Zurayids to the Ayyubids in 1193.

=== Invention of coffee ===
Muhammad Ibn Said Al Dhobhani, a 15th-century Sufi Imam, who traded goods between Yemen and Ethiopia, introduced the first coffee beans to Yemen. Within a short period coffee was exported out of Mokha and Aden to the rest of the world.

== Notable residents ==
- Reham al-Badr (1985–2018), human rights activist.

== See also ==
- Mocha coffee bean
- Caffè mocha
