= Maeen Al-Obaidi =

Women rights activist and lawyer from Yemen

- معين العبيدي
- Born: Yemen
- Known for: women right activism
- Awards: BBC 100 Women

Maeen Al-Obaidi (Arabic: معين العبيدي) is a Yemeni lawyer, who acts as a mediator in the city of Taiz in the context of the Yemeni civil war. She was honored as one of the BBC 100 Women in 2022.

== Biography ==
Al-Obaidi received a bachelor's degree in law from Taiz University, before going on to receive a diploma in public law from Assiut University in Egypt. Al-Obaidi practiced law in the city of Taiz, until the beginning of the civil war in Yemen in 2014. In this conflict, women suffered from arrests, sexual violence, displacement and forced recruitment of their children. She started working for peace through mediation, with the aim of facilitating prisoner exchanges so that combatants could return to their homes alive or their bodies would be returned to their families. Al-Obaidi volunteered with the Yemen Women Union, where she advocated for imprisoned women. She was also the first woman to get promoted to the Lawyers Syndicate Council, where she oversaw the committee on human rights and freedom.

== Recognition ==
In 2022 Al-Obaidi was named as one of BBC's 100 Women. She was the only Yemeni woman featured that year in the list.
