= Lutf al-Sarary =

Lutf al-Sarary is a Yemeni short story writer and journalist. Born in the countryside, he moved to Taiz as a youth. After graduation, he worked as a manager at Taiz University. His first piece was published in 2006 in the Yemeni newspaper al-Thaqafiah. He gradually made the switch to journalism, eventually becoming cultural editor of Hadeth al-Madenah. His first collection of short stories entitled Like Who Smokes One Cigarette in One Breath came out in 2009 and was well received by Yemeni critics.
