= Mawza district =

Coordinates: 13.3781°N 43.6144°E

Mawza District Muza
- District
- Interactive map of Mawza District
- Country: Yemen
- Governorate: Taiz

Population (2003)
  - Total: 119,818
- Time zone: UTC+3 (Yemen Standard Time)

Mawza District is a district of the Taiz Governorate, Yemen. As of 2003, the district had a population of 119,818 inhabitants.

== History ==
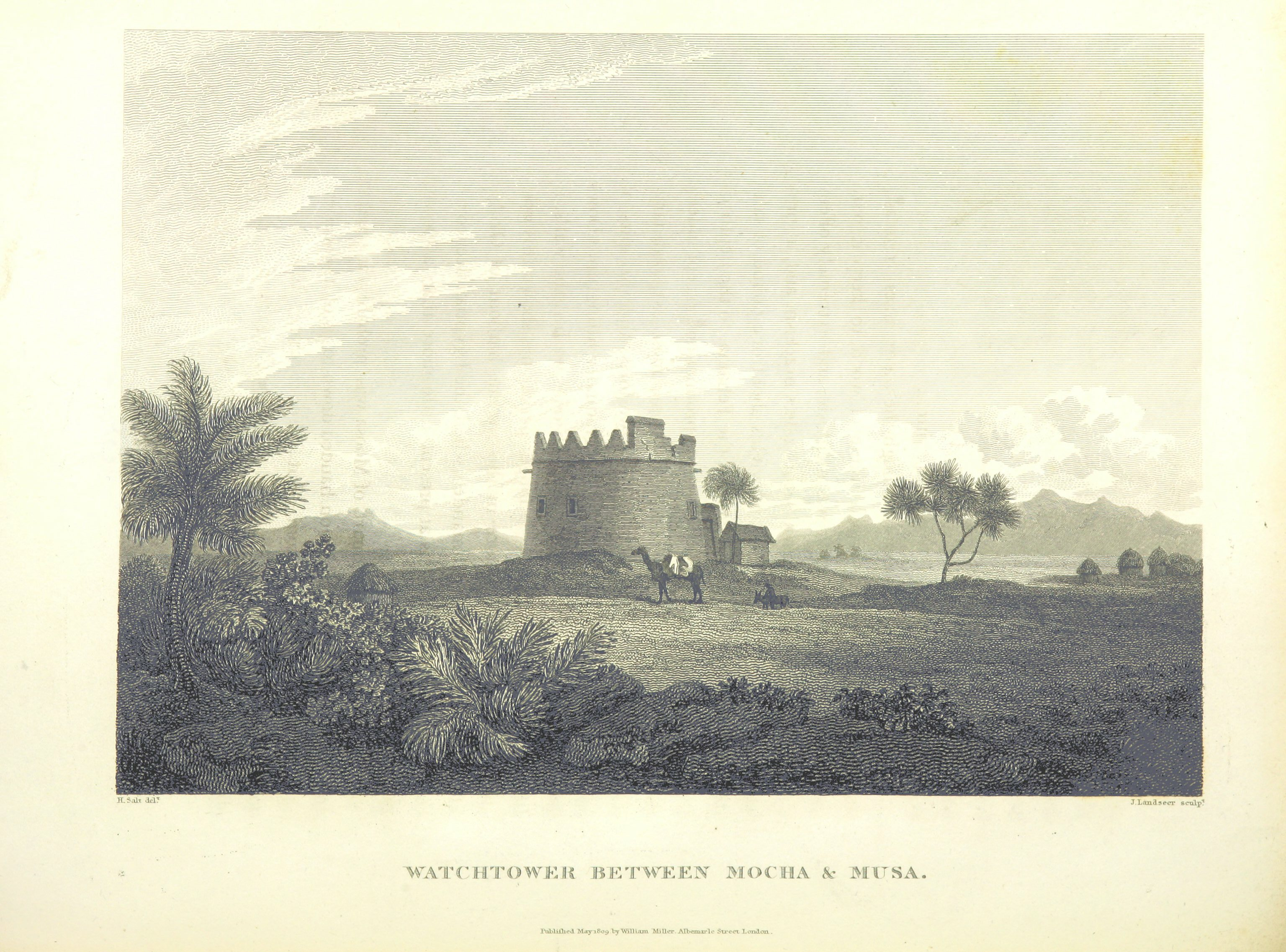
A watchtower between Mokha and Musa in 1805. Drawing by Henry Salt

Mawza'a was the regional capital of Mofar in ancient Yemen. The king of Mawza was mentioned in the Periplus of the Erythraean Sea.

=== Jewish Exile ===
During the rise of the expansion of the Zaydi state, when Mawza was part of the kingdom, most of the Yemenite Jews were expelled to Mawza' (1679-1680) in what became known by Yemenite Jews as the Mawza Exile.

=== Mokha Port ===
During the Mawza Exile, Mokha, 20 kilometres (12 mi) west of Mawza, was the main port of the Zaydi imamate, leading Muza to lose its status as the regional port of Mofar.
