= Reham =

Reham is a feminine given name of Arabic origin. Notable people with the name include:

== Given name ==
- Reham Al-Farra (1974–2003), Palestinian diplomat and journalist
- Reham al-Badr (1985–2018), Yemeni human rights activist
- Reham Abdel Ghafour (born 1978), Egyptian actress
- Reham Khan (born 1973), British-Pakistani journalist, author and filmmaker
- Reham Rafiq (born 1996), Pakistani actress
- Reham Yacoub (1991–2020), Iraqi human rights advocate and doctor
