= Battle of Moca (1779) =

1779 naval battle

- Part of American Revolutionary War
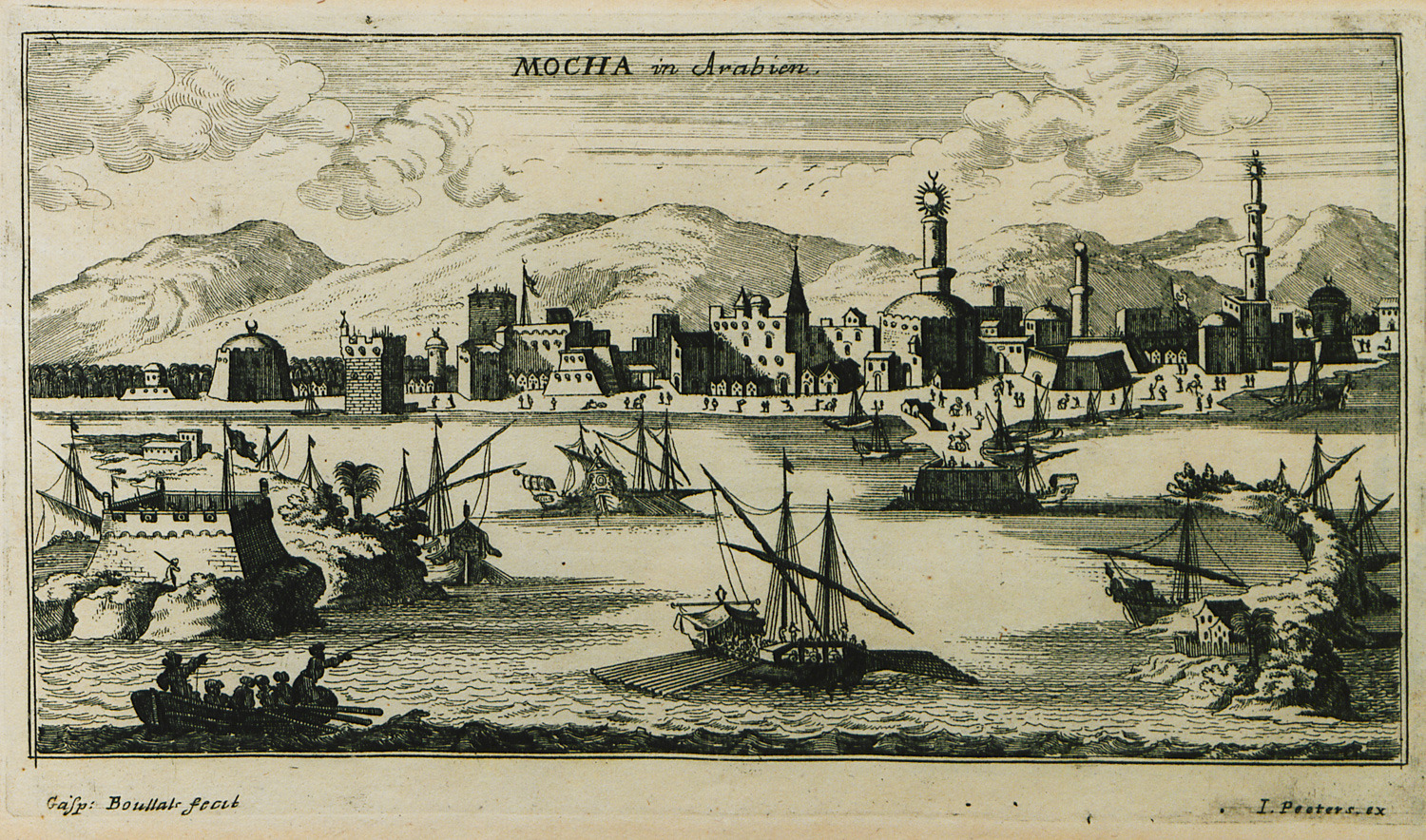
- View of Mocha, 1690
Date	8 June 1779
Location	Off Mokha, Yemen, Red Sea
Result	Portuguese victory

Belligerents
Kingdom of Portugal	Kingdom of Great Britain

Commanders and leaders
João Manuel de Azevedo e Brito	Captain Owart

Units involved
Nossa Senhora das Angústias e Almas	Morning Star

Strength
1 corvette, 2 forward guns, 2 aft guns	1 corvette

Casualties and losses
1 killed	14 killed 10 seriously wounded

The Battle of Moca (1779) was a naval action on 8 June 1779 between the Portuguese corvette Nossa Senhora das Angústias e Almas, commanded by João Manuel de Azevedo e Brito, and the British corvette Morning Star, commanded by Captain Owart, off the port of Mokha, Yemen, in the Red Sea. The Portuguese ship was escorting the French ambassador M. de S. Lubin to Suez and resisted British attempts to seize him.
