= Women's Forum for Research and Training =

The Women's Forum for Research and Training (WFRT) (Multaqa al-marʾa lil-dirasat, wa al-Tadrib), established in 2000, is "the major human rights organization for women in Yemen".

The WFRT was founded by the human rights activist Saud al-Qadasr, and is based in Ta'izz. It organizes workshops for government officials, promotes human rights issues with other NGOs and arranges training for grass-roots activists.
