= Yemeni cheese =

Type of cheese produced in Yemen

- Other names: Taizz cheese
- Country of origin: Yemen
- Source of milk: Sheep's or goat's.
- Texture: Semi-hard, hard-surface.
- Dimensions: Round and flat, usually about 20 cm in diameter and 4 cm thick.
- Weight: 1 kg.

Yemeni cheese also known as Taiz cheese (Arabic: جبنة تعز) and known in Yemen as "local cheese" (Jubn Baladi), is a type of Yemeni cheese that is produced in rural areas of Yemen most famously in Taiz Governorate which is why it is known as Taizz cheese although other local names are given based on the region or the village the cheese was produced. Visitors to Taiz city usually buy the Taiz cheese in al-Bab al-Kabeer and Bab Musa markets as gifts for their families. The production of the Taiz cheese has not been affected by the production of processed cheese because most Yemenis still prefer the local cheese.

== Characteristics ==
The Taiz cheese is smoked. Different types of plants are used to smoke the cheese which gives it the brown color and a special flavor depending on the plants that are used for smoking.

== Method of production ==
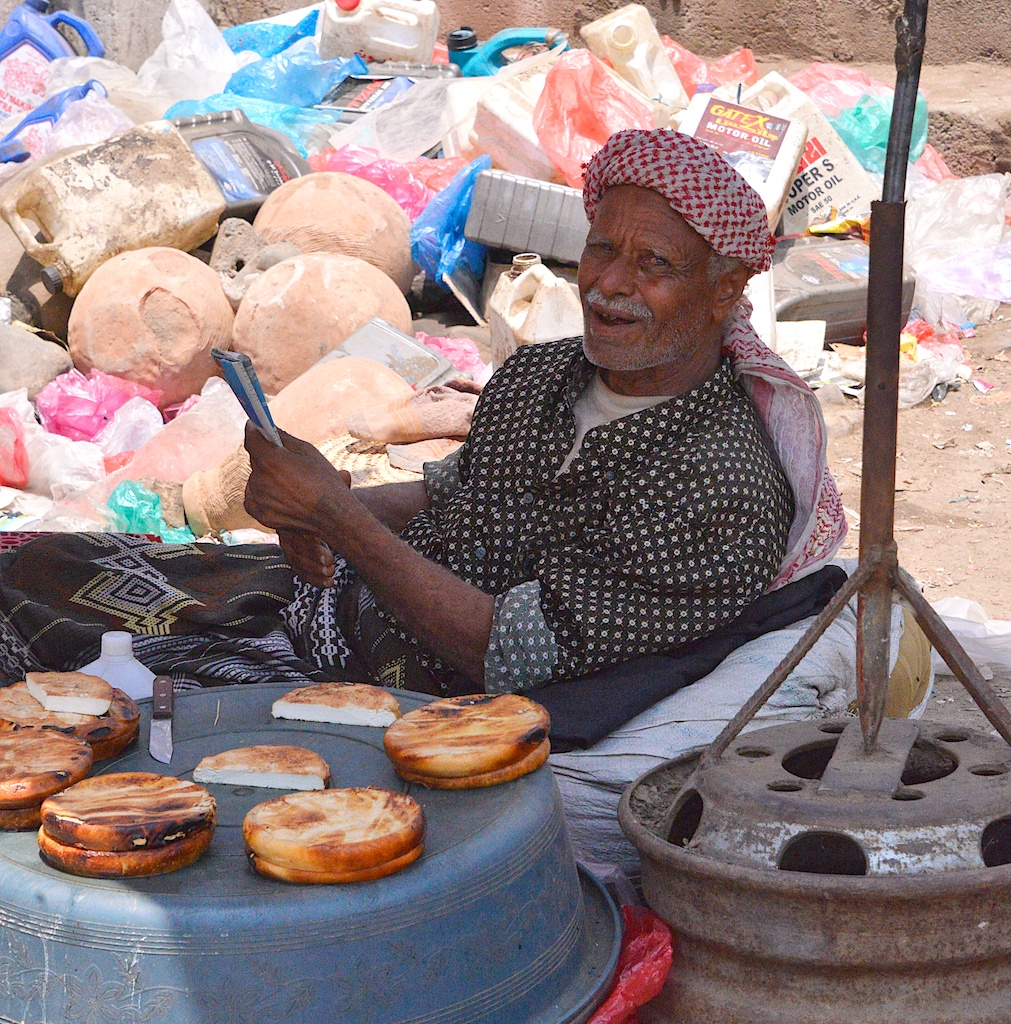
Cheese Seller in Yemen

Yemeni cheese is usually prepared in the evening. The milk is collected during the day in pots to be coagulated. The coagulant used is the stomach of a suckling lamb, goat kid or calf. Each producer has his way of utilizing the stomach for this purpose. While earthenware pots are traditional, aluminum pots are also used.

After one day the texture of the curd is tested by pressing with fingers. After the curd reaches the proper texture it is taken to small baskets where it stays for the rest of the day. It is often placed between two smoked cheeses that are ready to eat. The cheese is ready to be smoked by the evening. The smoking process takes about 10-15 minutes and extends the shelf-life of the cheese.
