= Mocha coffee bean =

Type of coffee bean

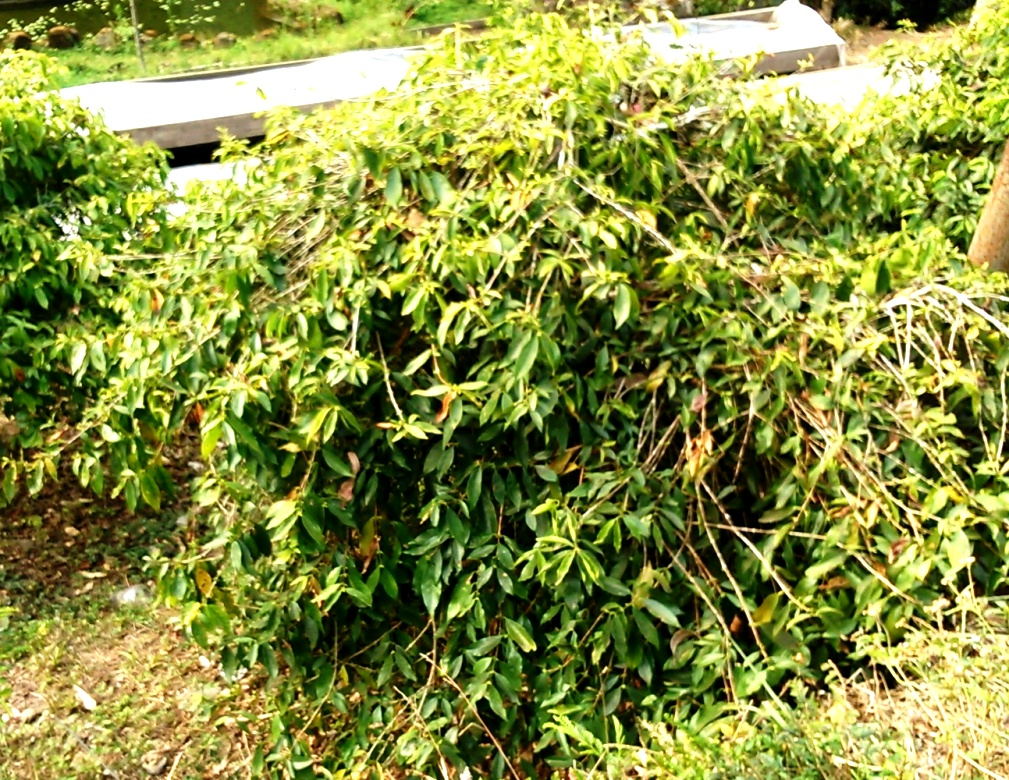
Mocha coffee tree

The Mocha coffee bean is a variety of coffee bean originally from Yemen. It is harvested from the coffee-plant species Coffea arabica, which is native to Yemen. Mocha coffee beans are very small, hard, have an irregular round shape, and are olive green to pale yellow in color.

The name "Mocha" comes from the port of Mokha (also known as Mocha; al-Mukhā) through which most Yemeni coffee was exported before the 20th century. As of 1911, the export market had mostly moved to Aden and Hodeidah. The current central market for Yemeni coffee is at Bayt al-Faqih, about 140 km north of Mocha. This coffee is grown in the mountain districts of Jabal Haraz, Al Udayn district (also known as Uden), and Taiz, to the east.

== See also ==
- Caffè mocha
