= Adam Saif =

Yemeni actor

Adam Saif Ismail (born 1957) is a Yemeni actor best known for his comic character Dehbash in the TV series Hekayat Dehbash. He was born in Taiz in central Yemen. He has numerous television, radio, theatrical and musical works.

== Early life ==
Saif joined the Taiz Ministry of Culture Office National Theatre Band. He was chosen by director Abdul Aziz al-Harazi to play the comedic character "Hufazi" in the Al-Mahr series, where his TV stardom started.

== Main works ==
- Hekayat Dehbash (Dehbash Tales) series
- Dehbash fi Mahab Alreeh (Dehbash blew in the wind) series
- Dheab wa laken (Wolves, but) series
- AlKhafafeesh (The Bats) series
- Abu Alkheer series
- Alaknea Almutasaqetah (The Dropped Masks) play
- Zawejona Ya Nas (Oh People help me get married) play
