= Bayt al-Faqih =

Bayt al-Faqīh بيت الفـــقية
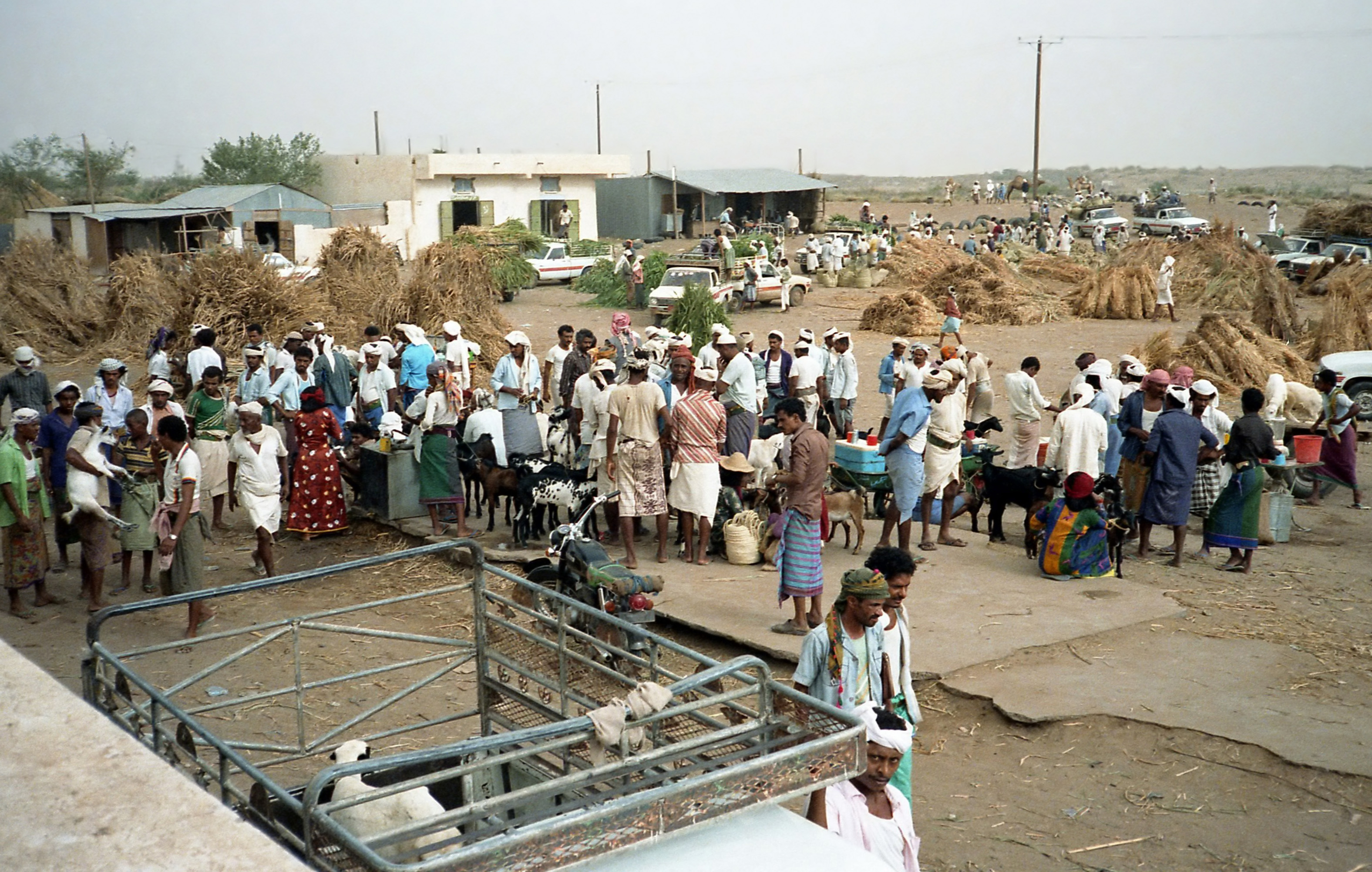
- Market of Bayt al-Faqih

- Location in Yemen
- Coordinates: 14°30′58″N 43°10′28″E
- Country: Yemen
- Governorate: Al Hudaydah Governorate
- Time zone: UTC+3 (Yemen Standard Time)

Bayt al-Faqīh or Beit al-Faqih (archaic Betelfaguy; Arabic: بيت الفـــقية Bayt al-Faqīh, 'House of the Jurist') is a city in Al Hudaydah Governorate in Yemen. It is located on the pilgrimage and trade route across the Tihamah plain between Al Hudaydah and Taiz. It is 50 km south of Al Hudaydah and 150 km southwest of the Yemeni capital of Sanaa and lies at an altitude of 122 m. Its population was 28,773 in the 1994 census and was estimated at 41,652 in 2005.

== History ==
=== Name ===
Bayt al-Faqih was founded by, and named after, the renowned Rasulid-era jurist Ahmad ibn Ujayl, who taught here during his lifetime. The 15th-century author Ahmad al-Sharji wrote: "There were no villages here before the establishment of the faqih. When he settled in this place, the people came to live near him." The place was originally called Bayt al-Faqih Ahmad ibn ʽUjayl, which was then shortened to Bayt al-Faqih. When Ahmad ibn Ujayl died in 1291 (690 AH), he was buried in the family cemetery, and a mausoleum was built up around his tomb. His mausoleum is located a bit to the west of the modern town, and the whole complex is surrounded by a small wall.

Ahmad ibn Ujayl enjoyed an especially close relationship with the Rasulid sultans, who exempted Bayt al-Faqih from taxation. The town also served as a political sanctuary, during Ahmad ibn Ujayl's life and after, with only one known incident where the Rasulids arrested someone who had taken refuge in Bayt al-Faqih: in 1346 or 1347 (747 AH), a faqih named Ali ibn Abi Bakr al-Fariqi sought refuge here from the Rasulid sultan al-Mujahid Ali, but the sultan's agents "did not hesitate to arrest him". This arrangement continued through the 15th century when Ahmad al-Sharji wrote that Bayt al-Faqih still enjoyed tax exemption and served as a place of refuge.

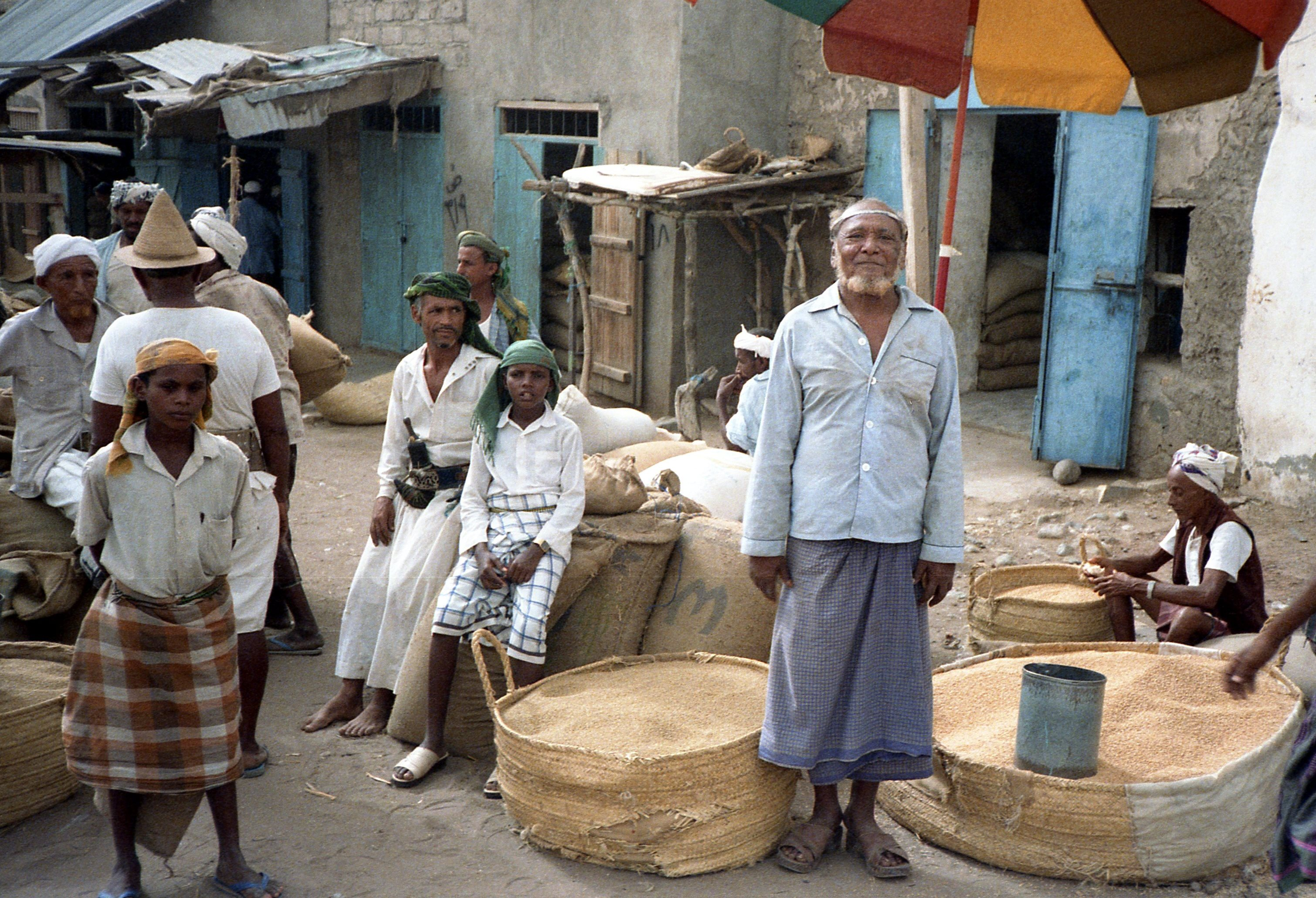
A Zaranig man

Ibn Battuta visited the grave of the individual for whom the city is named after, the celebrated jurist Ahmad b. Musa b. Ali Ujail (1212–1291).

Although today most of the population of Bayt al-Faqih work in the weaving or jewelry industries, the city was historically known as the source of coffee exported through the port of Mokha. The Qasimi Zaydi imams established it as a centralized coffee emporium for this purpose in the mid-seventeenth century; at its peak, it attracted many merchants from Jidda, Basra, and elsewhere. The town's Friday souk (market) is a remnant of the town's once-thriving coffee trade.

=== Danish Arabia expedition ===
Map of Yemen, drawn by Carsten Niebuhr, 1763

Bayt al-Faqih is one of the desert towns visited by the explorers of the Danish Arabia expedition (1761–1767). Given the location of the town in the middle of the Tihamah plain, it served as a headquarters for the exploration of the area in all directions. In particular, the cartographer Carsten Niebuhr used the town as a base for a series of long reconnaissances into the desert to gather information for his map of Yemen, which was widely used until the twentieth century. As shown on the map, Beit el-Fakih (sic) is the central crossing point of the routes connecting Al Luḩayyah, Sanaa and Mokha.

As described by Thorkild Hansen in his historical recounting of the expedition

...coffee dealers from the Hejaz, Egypt, Syria, Turkey and Morocco, indeed even from Persia and India, came to visit Beit el-Fakih to buy; yet it was far from being a wealthy town. There were only a few stone-built houses; the majority of the population lived in straw huts built in random confusion in the narrow dusty street, where the camels of the coffee traders passed by
