= Reham al-Badr =

Yemeni human rights activist (1985–2018)

- ريهام البدر
- Born: 1985; At Turbah, Yemen Arab Republic
- Died: February 8, 2018 (aged 32–33); Taiz, Yemen
- Cause of death: Killed by Houthi forces
- Education: Taiz University
- Organization(s): Nofoodh; National Commission to Investigate Alleged Violations to Human Rights

Reham al-Badr (Arabic: ريهام البدر; c. 1985–2018) was a Yemeni human rights activist. She was known for humanitarian work during the siege of Taiz following the outbreak of the Yemeni Civil War until she was killed by Houthi forces

== Biography ==
Al-Badr was born in At Turbah, a village in Taiz Governorate, around 75 kilometres from the city of Taiz. In 2017, she graduated from Taiz University with a degree in English.

During the Yemeni revolution in 2011, al-Badr took part in protests in Taiz against the President of Yemen, Ali Abdullah Saleh, calling for his resignation; Saleh was eventually ousted in 2012. The following year, during and following the year-long National Dialogue Conference aimed at reconciling different sides as part of the Yemeni peace process, al-Badr established Nofoodh, a non-governmental organisation that educated Yemeni citizens about the proposals and outcomes of the NDC.

In September 2014, a popular revolt began in Sanaa against Saleh's successor as president, Abdrabbuh Mansour Hadi, by the Houthis, an Islamist political and military organisation, which led to the outbreak of the Yemeni civil war. Al-Badr, a supporter of Hadi, helped organise protests in Taiz calling for peace. In April 2015, Houthi forces began to capture parts of Taiz, leading to a protracted military confrontation between Houthis and the internationally recognised Yemeni government. During the siege, al-Badr established various initiatives to deliver humanitarian services and aids to people in Taiz, including providing medicines and foods. Al-Badr also regularly spoke to the media to convey the situation in Taiz nationally and internationally. She stressed the importance of women in resolving challenges caused by the civil war.

Al-Badr also worked as a field researcher for the National Commission to Investigate Alleged Violations to Human Rights, reporting from Taiz Governorate. Al-Badr documented humanitarian conditions as well as violations by Houthi forces. Al-Badr was a vocal supporter of the Yemeni government led by Hadi, and called for the Houthis to transfer power back to it. In 2017, al-Badr called for the liberation of Taiz from Houthi occupation.

In 2015, al-Badr was arrested while trying to deliver medical supplies in al-Hawban. She was detained in a school that had been converted into a prison, but was able to escape after a Saudi airstrike hit the school. She was subsequently re-arrested and placed in a military camp, but was able to escape for a second time following another airstrike. Al-Badr's brother Ahmed was killed in March 2017 while fighting Houthi forces outside a military hospital in eastern Taiz.

On 8 February 2018, al-Badr was killed while delivering humanitarian aid in Sala, eastern Taiz. Her cause of death was unclear, with it being variously reported that she had been shot by a Houthi sniper or killed during a Houthi mortar strike that caused fatal abdomen injuries. Al-Badr was killed along a fellow aid worker, Mu'men Saeed Hammoud Salem, while a third, Ahmed Mohammed al-Saamt, was seriously injured. Al-Badr was 32 at the time of her death.

Al-Badr's funeral took place on 9 February in Taiz with hundreds of mourners in attendance. The Prime Minister of Yemen, Ahmed Obaid bin Dagher, expressed his condolences on Twitter, describing her as a martyr. Reham's cousin stated that the Houthis were responsible for al-Badr's death. Tawakkol Karman expressed her "deep condolences" to al-Badr's family, describing her death as a "new tragedy".

As of 2020, no one had been charged with the deaths of al-Badr and Salem.

What Have You Left Behind?, a 2018 oral history of attacks on civilians during the Yemeni Civil War by Bushra al-Maqtari, is dedicated to al-Badr.
