= Muza (emporion) =

Red Sea trading post in modern Yemen

Muza and Musa and Mousa (Ancient Greek: Μύζα and Μοῦσα and Μοῦζα and Μούζα) was an important emporion on the Arabian coast of the Red Sea in Arabia Felix near the Strait of Bab-el-Mandeb in modern Yemen. Now it is inland from the modern port city of Mokha due to the recession of the coast.

The city was mentioned in the Periplus of the Erythraean Sea, Pliny the Elder's Natural History and Ptolemy's Geography.

Pliny describe the Musa as the third port of Arabia Felix. The Periplus of the Erythraean Sea has a detailed description of its trade.
