= Iftihan al-Mashhari =

Yemeni civil servant (died 2025)

- إفتحان المشهري

Director of the Taiz Cleanliness and Improvement Fund
- In office October 2023 – 18 September 2025

Personal details
- Died: September 18, 2025 Taiz, Yemen
- Cause of death: Assassination by gunshot
- Children: 2
- Education: Taiz University
- Occupation: Civil servant

Iftihan al-Mashhari (Arabic: إفتحان المشهري; died 18 September 2025) was a Yemeni civil servant who served as director of Taiz's Cleanliness and Improvement Fund from 2023 until her assassination in 2025. She was known for her work to maintain basic sanitation in the city during the Yemeni civil war, and for her resistance to corruption during her time in local government.

== Early life and education ==
Al-Mashhari was born in al-Maafer district, Taiz Governorate, into a political family; her father served for a time as Yemen's consul in Turkey. She studied and later worked at Taiz University.

At the time of her death, al-Mashhari was divorced with two children, one of whom was studying in China.

== Career ==
In October 2023, al-Mashhari was appointed as director of the Cleanliness and Improvement Fund in Taiz, responsible for managing the city's sanitation in light of the ongoing Yemeni civil war. Al-Mashhari sought to maintain basic sanitation services in the city, which was demarcated by Houthi-controlled areas in the west and north of the city, and pro-government areas, dominated by al-Islah and its associated militias, in the city's east and centre.

Al-Mashhari was the first woman to serve as the director of sanitation in Taiz. She was a member of the Wahag Women's Hub, which advocated for women leaders and activists to be included as part of the Yemeni peace process.

Al-Mashhari was not affiliated with any political party, armed group, or tribe, and fought against corruption during her tenure. She refused to authorise the payment of a 200 million YER "tribute" to a member of the 170th Air Defence Brigade, linked to al-Islah, from the sanitation budget, as well as demands for payments to other armed groups operating in Taiz.

In August 2025, al-Mashhari's office was raided by armed gunmen led by Muhammad Sadiq al-Makhlafi, a member of the 170th Air Defence Brigade, after she refused to bargain or pay levies over a government building being used by civilians. The group threatened to kill al-Mashhari, and forced the temporary closure of her office. Around the same time, al-Mashhari became the subject of criticism in public sermons by local religious leaders such as al-Islah politician Abdullah al-'Adini, who stated that women's place was in the home. Shortly afterwards, she filed a criminal complaint with Taiz Police over ongoing threats and harassment, but was not offered any state protection as a result of this.

== Assassination and response ==
On 18 September 2025, al-Mashhari was assassinated by gunmen on a motorcycle while driving at the Sihan roundabout in central Taiz. More than 30 shots were fired, with around 20 hitting al-Mashhari, largely to the head, killing her instantly. Al-Mashhari's death marked the first killing of a female leader during the Yemeni civil war. She was in her fifties at the time of her death.

On 30 September 2025, thousands of people attended al-Mashhari's funeral at al-Saeed Mosque, and her burial in al-Maafer. The service was led by the governor of Taiz, Nabil Shamsan, and sanitation workers carried her casket. Her father, Mohammed al-Mashhari, called on the Presidential Leadership Council to apprehend his daughter's remaining killers, describing her as "a martyr of Taiz and the entire republic".

Widespread protests took place across Taiz following al-Mashhari's killing. Sanitation workers went on an indefinite strike, leading to a build-up in refuse across the city. Members of her family and other protesters set up up sit-in protest tents across the city, including outside local government buildings, demanding justice for her death. Some demanded a purge of militia-controlled neighbourhoods in Taiz, accusing al-Islah of protecting its affiliated armed groups at the expense of providing justice and accountability for people killed in the conflict. Local press and activists claimed that al-Makhlafi, the al-Islah-linked member of the 170th Air Defence Brigade, who had threatened al-Mashhari the previous month, was responsible for her death. Osama al-Sharabi of Taiz Police had accused al-Makhlafi of the 170th Air Defence Brigade of blocking the manhunt into finding al-Mashhari's killers, which al-Makhlafi denied.

Taiz police arrested four people in relation to al-Mashhari's death, including the motorcycle driver, on 22 September 2025, in Mushra'a wa Hadnan. On 24 September, the main suspect, Mohammed Sadeq al-Mukhlafi, was killed during a security operation in al-Rawda in northern Taiz. Two other suspects, Humam Marei and Arafat Ali Mansour, were arrested during the same operation.

Al-Mashhari's death was condemned by Yemeni organisations including the Women's Solidarity Network, the National Women's Committee, Karama, the Abductees' Mothers Association, and Women Journalists Without Chains. The National Women's Committee recognised al-Mashhari for "dedicating her life to serving the city of Taiz". Al-Islah also condemned her killing. The Joint Security Campaign, comprising the Taiz Military Axis and the Provincial Police, described her death as "a desperate attempt to assassinate the spirit of Taiz". Saferworld also condemned her killing.
