= Al-Qahira Castle =

Yemeni castle

Al-Qahira Castle قلعة القاهرة
- Taiz, Yemen
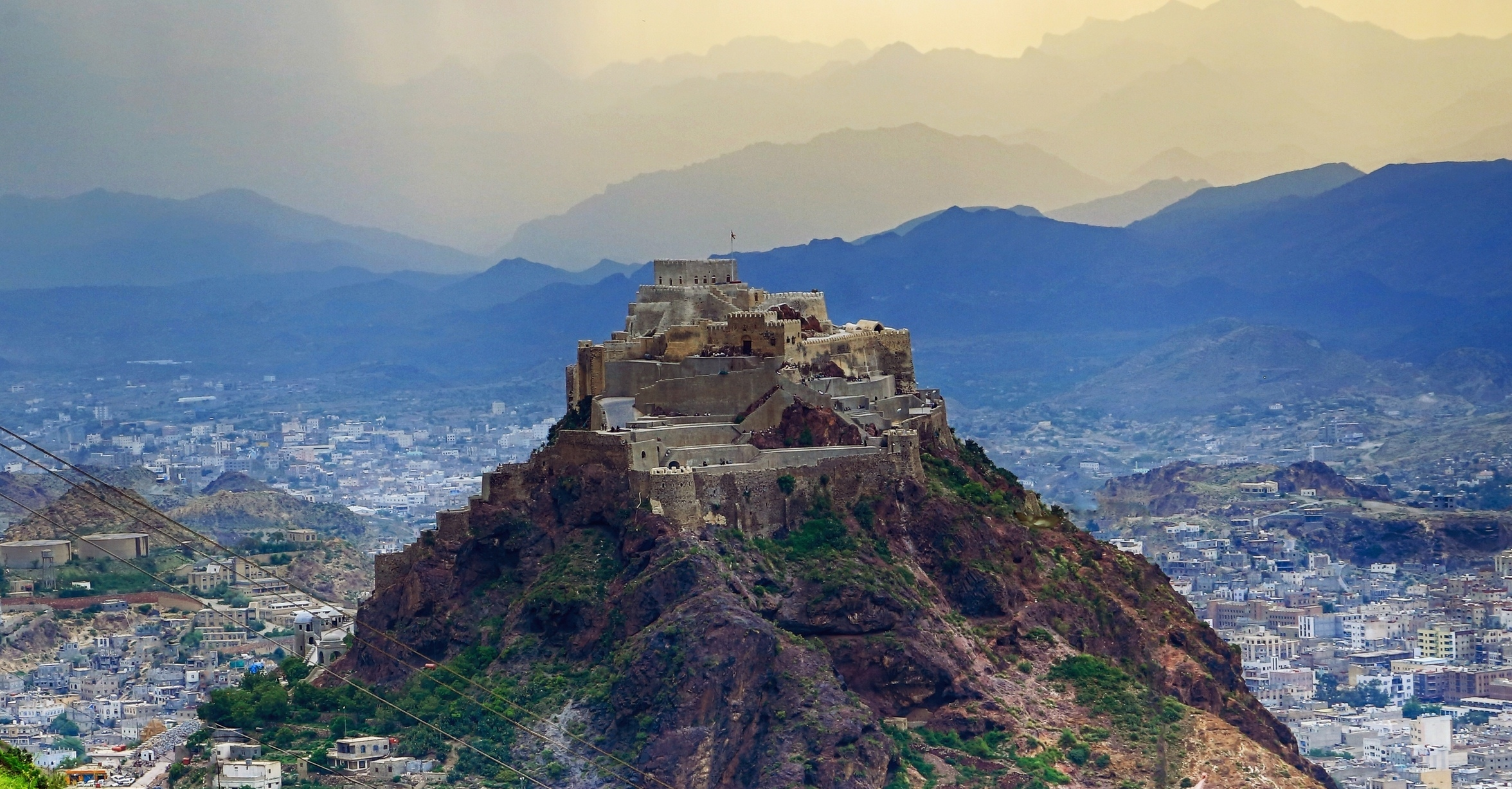
- Al-Qahira Castle overview, before destruction

Site information
- Type: hilltop castle
- Condition: Reportedly destroyed by Saudi-led coalition airstrikes in 2015

Location
- Coordinates: 13.5670°N 44.0135°E

Site history
- Built: 12th century
- Built by: Abdullah bin Muhammad Al-Sulayhi

Al-Qahira Castle is a historic castle in the ancient city of Taiz, Yemen on the northern slope of Mount Sabr among rocky highlands overlooking the city. It is said that the area was originally referred as the old Taiz, and later renamed as Al-Qahira. The castle is considered as the nucleus of the city of Taiz.

The sultan of the Sulayhids 'Abd Allah ibn Muhammad al-Sulayhi commissioned the castle in the first half of the 12th-century and it was expanded during the rule of his brother Ali ibn Muhammad al-Sulayhi.

== Architecture ==
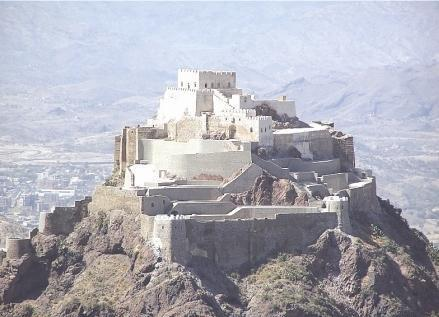
The castle before it was struck by an airstrike of the Saudi-led coalitions

Al-Qahira Castle consists of two sections. The first section is called "Al-Adina" and includes gardens constructed in the form of a terrace built on the slope of the mountain. Water vapor and basins are carved and built-in one of the facades of the mountain, as well as the mansions scattered around it, surrounded by towers and parks. In this section, there are four palaces, each named Dar al-Adab, Dar al-Shajarah, Dar al-'Adil, and Dar al-'Amara. Dar al-'Amara was specially designated for the sultan and as the guest house for distinguished guests, and it was attached with the tunnels and secret passages connecting to the other palaces. The second part of the castle is referred to as "the area of the Maghreb", and consists of a number of palaces, guard towers, grain storage facilities, and water reservoirs. The wall of the castle is one of the most important historical artifacts of the city of Taiz, which was built in ancient times in order to contain all the neighborhoods of the old city. It is also believed to have been founded in the era of the Sulayhid dynasty and was built with complex engineering technology. Its height reaches 120 meters and a thickness of four meters, and it contained rooms for servants and guardians, some of which still remain today.

As for the castle wall, it connects with the old wall of Taiz, which had four main gates: Bab al-Kabir, Bab Musa, Bab al-Madjar, and Bab al-Nasr. Above the gate existed a watchtower guarding the city. The main entrance to the castle is located on the south side of the Al-Moayad area. It consists of a madrasa (school) built by the Sultan al-Muayyad in 1281, a small dome, a pond, and the remains of Sultan Al-Muayyed Park. The madrasa has a small sahn, and the park still stands until today.

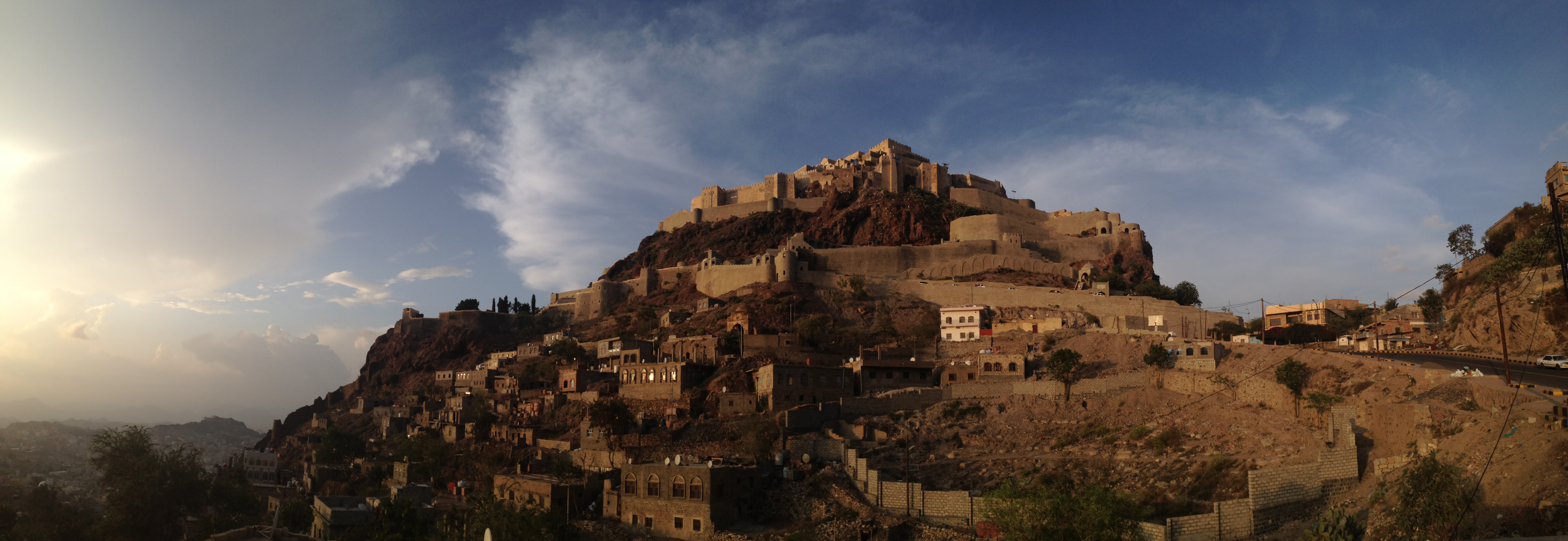
Panoramic view of the castle

== Destruction ==
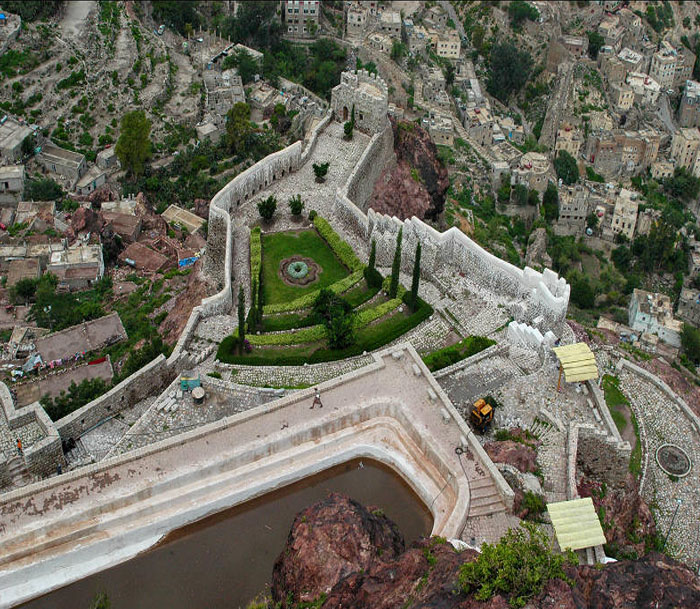
Top down view of Al-Qahira Castle garden.

In 2015, during the course of the Yemeni Civil War, the castle was taken over by Houthi rebels, and struck by an airstrike of the Saudi-led coalitions afterwards. The local outlet stated that the castle was "destroyed", although the level of destruction remains unclear.

According to a UNESCO report, Al-Qahira Castle was damaged in two separate strikes: on May 10 and May 21, 2015. 30% of the castle was damaged in the second strike.

The castle was later taken over by al-Qaeda-linked Abu Al Abbas Brigades, who used it as a military barracks. On 26 August 2018, the castle was reported to be under the control of the internationally recognized Yemeni government who reopened it for visitors after defeating the UAE-backed Abu Al Abbas Brigades. The castle was closed for 4 years and was being used as barracks.

== See also ==
- List of castles in Yemen
