= Sabri Al-Haiki =

Yemeni writer (born 1961)

Sabri Al Haiki
- Born: Sabri Abdulkarim Galeb Al-Haiki; 25 December 1961 (age 64); Taiz, Yemen
- Education: Master of Dramatic Arts,(Academy of Arts)
- Known for: Poetry, painting, dramatic criticism
- Movement: Post modernism
- Awards: Yemeni Theater Pioneers Award (2010)

Sabri Al-Haiki (Arabic: صبري الحيقي; born 25 December 1961), also known as Sabri Abdulkarim Galeb Al-Haiki, is a Yemeni painter, critic, and poet.

== Biography ==
Sabri Al-Haiki was born on the 25th of December 1961 in Taiz (Aokaba), Yemen.

He began his literary and artistic life at the age of fifteen. He started publishing his poetic works and critical writings in official newspapers and specialized literacy journals, such as the Egyptian magazine poetry. He was a member of both the Union of Yemeni Writers and the Arab Writers Union, and was a founding member of the Yemeni Artists Syndicate. Sabri Al-Haiki was also responsible for editing art magazines and literary magazines in the Ministry of Culture in Yemen. His biography was published in the Encyclopedia of the Almoheet, in the Dictionary of Poets 1/6 from the Pre-Islamic Period to the year 2000 C2, and in the Dictionary of Writers 1/7 from the Pre-Islamic Period to the year 2000 C3.

Sabri Al-Haiki was a founding member of the ''Modern art Group in Sana'a, Yemen" (1992), one of the pioneers of the Yemeni theater, and the first academic in the field of dramatic criticism.

The Ministry of Culture awarded him the honorary shield for pioneers of Yemeni theater with a cash prize in 2010. He is a member of the PhilPapers community.

== Career ==
Sabri Al Haiki started writing in Taiz for the official newspaper of the Republic in 1978. He had a fixed column on the last page named 'Obsessions'. In 1979, Sabri Al-Haiki was a founding member of the Yemini Writers and Writers Union branch. During his studies, he secured a position with the Ministry of Information and Culture, working in the morning and studying during the evening. He moved to Sana'a during the 1980s. He was the editor for the arts page in the Revolution newspaper. After completing high school, he received a scholarship to study drama from the state of Kuwait. Then, in 1985, he returned to Yemen after receiving his bachelor's degree in criticism and theatrical literature. In Yemen, he edited a literary magazine). He was also a founding member of the Yemeni Artists Syndicate in addition to being a member of the Union of Arab Writers.

Sarbi Al-Haiki was the founding Member of the "Modern Art Group", which was founded in 1992 in Sana'a.

=== Education ===
- Bachelor of Criticism and Theatrical Literature, Higher Institute of Theatrical Art, Kuwait, 1985.
- High Diploma and Public administration National Institute of Administrative Science, Sana'a, 1997.
- Diploma, Drama and Criticism; Academy of Arts, Cairo, 2001–2003.
- Master of Arts Dramatic; Academy of Arts, Cairo, 2003–2006.
- 2021 Ph.D.In Technicals of novel.

=== Scientific studies and research ===
• The problem of compatibility in the character of Drama Hero 1985 Kuwait, Higher Institute of Dramatic Arts. (BA from the Department of criticism and literature), published in the magazine Yemen new in March 1998.

• Administrative establishment in Yemen applied to the General Organization of Theater and Cinema 1995 National Institute of Administrative Sciences Sana'a.

• The technique features of Playwriting in Yemen, Academy of Arts Cairo 2006.

• In addition to a large number of studies published in newspapers, magazines and cultural sites.

== Works ==
=== Published books ===
Studies:

• Al-Haiki, Sabri. (2026). In the theory of text sources. Aalm Alfekr Magazine.Issue 197 . Kuwait.

Al-Haiki, Sabri. (2025) “The Philosophy of Substitution in the Holy Qur’an”. Annals of the Arts and Social Sciences 45, no. 668". University of Kuwait.

Al-Haiki, Sabri. (2023). "Irony in the text. Annals of the arts and social sciences. Volume 44. Monograph 636." University of Kuwait.

- Signifier and substitution in the sources of the text, Sana'a, Abadi Center for Studies and Publication, 2008.
- Irony in the Yemeni Novelist Text, Critics Make a Wave for the Sea, (in conjunction with a group of researchers), Sana'a, Yemeni Literary and Writers Union, 2008.
- Irony in the art of caricature, Naji al-Ali, (together with a group of researchers), [Sana'a], Center for Yemeni Studies and Research, 2008.

Texts:

- Zaid Al-Moushaki, "A Historical Story of the Boys", on the Children's Book Series, Ministry of Information and Culture, Sana'a, 1983. (Novel).
- Poetry in the Time of Chaos, 1985, Commercial Printing, Kuwait. Poetry
- Abundance, 1990, the printing press of Akrama, Syria. (Poetry).
- Fortune-Teller, play 1992.
- L'ivre Caravane, Paris, Sous le patronage de I'Unesco, 1993.
- 2000 AD, anthology poems, in French, with some of the works of the pictorial images "Azabel and Les":

Yemen Peuple des Sables, "Belgium", LA RENAISSANCE LIVR, 2000.

- Participation in (the dictionary of the Babtain contemporary Arab poets).
- Participation in the Dictionary of Poets 1–6 from the pre-Islamic to the year 2000, 2c.

Participation in the dictionary of Writers 1–7 from the pre-Islamic to the year 2000, C 3.

- 1995, Studied some of his poetry, in some scientific messages and research, such as a doctorate, in stylistic in modern Yemeni poetry Ain Shams University – Cairo. Dr. Ahmed Kassem Al-Zomor.
- Papers from the Abundance piography, (Novel), (Magazine, published the Yemeni Writers Union, June 2007).
- Philosophy of substitution, 2007–2022.(Search is a refereed).
- Irony in the text, 2013. (New Study).

== Exhibitions ==
- January 1994, first personal exhibition (Damon Hall) sponsored by the Ministry of Culture, Sana'a.

== Bibliography ==
- Sabri Haiqui
- 1997, Logo designer for The General Yemenian Book Organization.
- 1997, Cover designer for HeelTaps,(Coffection of Poetry and Prose) by: Sulaiman al-Issa.
- Manager of editing: Yemeni Culture Magazine, Year 11 Issue 66-67-68-69. 2002.
- New Yemen Magazine, March 1988 Study of Adjustment Problem in character drama hero.P29-62.
- 7 May 1987, interview in: Art Supplement United Arab Emirates newspaper.
- 2007, Novel text, in: wisdom Magazine, published by the Yemeni Writers Union, June 2007.
- Stylistic in modern Yemeni poetry, pp 308–316.‹Book› for "Dr. Ahmed Kassem Al-Zomor",(First edition),1996.
