= Taiz University =

University in Yemen

- جامعة تعز
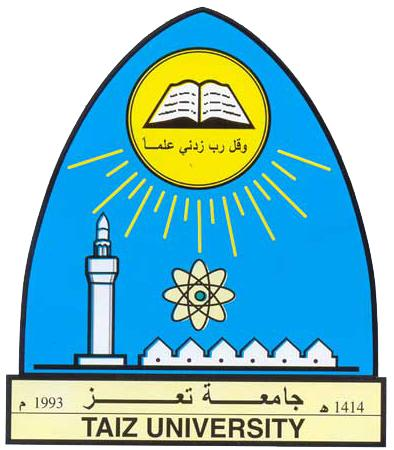
- Type: Public
- Established: 19 April 1993; 33 years ago, Opened: 11 October 1995; 30 years ago
- President: Prof. Dr. Mohammed AL-Shouaibi
- Location: Taiz, Yemen
- Campus: Multiple sites
- Website: taiz.edu.ye

Taiz University was founded in Yemen, Taiz, on 19 April 1993, and opened on 11 October 1995. It consists of eight colleges and five science centres.

== Colleges ==
=== Faculty of Education ===
The Faculty of Education at Taiz University was established in the academic year 1985–1986 as an affiliated college of Sana’a University. It initially offered programs in Islamic Studies, Arabic Language, Biology, Chemistry, and Mathematics, and later expanded to include English, Physics, Psychology, and Qur’anic Studies among other specializations. The faculty operates on a four-year undergraduate system with a two-semester academic calendar and awards the Bachelor of Education in multiple subject areas, including Educational Foundations, Curriculum and Instruction, Sciences, Languages, and Counseling. The faculty comprises several academic departments that offer both undergraduate and postgraduate programs.

Postgraduate education in the faculty includes master’s and doctoral programs in various specializations such as Educational Administration, Curriculum and Instruction, Educational Technology, Counseling, and Special Education. These programs are designed to develop advanced academic and research competencies in the teaching profession and related educational fields.

=== Faculty of science ===
The Faculty of Applied Sciences at Taiz University was established in the academic year 1990–1991 as an affiliated college of Sana’a University. It operates on a four-year undergraduate curriculum with a two‑semester academic calendar and aims to prepare specialists in basic sciences while conducting scientific and applied research relevant to the needs of Yemeni society.

At the undergraduate level, the faculty offers Bachelor of Science programs including Computer Science and Parasitology. It also awards bachelor’s and postgraduate degrees in disciplines such as Applied Microbiology, Chemistry, Life Sciences, Geology, Physics, and Mathematics.

Postgraduate study in the faculty includes master’s programs in selected basic science disciplines, designed to develop advanced academic and research competencies in science education and practice.

In 2023, the faculty introduced a Bachelor of Science in Cybersecurity, preparing graduates for careers such as cybersecurity consultant, cybersecurity engineer, cybersecurity analyst, information and security manager, software developer, and network administrator.

- Faculty of Medicine
- Faculty of Arts
- Faculty of Administrative Sciences
- Faculty of Law
- Faculty of Engineering and Information Technology
- Faculty of Education, Arts and Sciences (in Al-Turba)
- Faculty of Computers & information technology (in Al-Turba)

== Centers ==
- Languages Centre
- Training and Consultancy Centre
- Centre of Training and Educational Development
- Centre of Environmental Studies and Community Service
- Centre of Cultural activities and Media
- Center of Graduate Studies
- Center of Academic Excellence and Ranking
- Center of Quality Assurance and Accreditation

== Academic excellence and ranking ==
=== Center for Academic Excellence and Ranking ===
The Center of Academic Excellence and Ranking at Taiz University is a institutional unit that was Established by a presidential decision on 2025, to measure the university performance indicators and monitor its involvement in international, regional, and national ranking systems. The establishment of the center was formalized to co-ordinate ranking submissions, institutional benchmarking and data management of quality related information throughout the university. The coordinated institutional activities under the chairmanship of Prof. Dr. Mogeeb Mosleh, Dean of the Center of Academic Excellence and Ranking, facilitated recognition of the achievements of Taiz University in the world, regionally, and nationally in a relatively short period. These activities were aimed at harmonizing institutional data with the international methods of ranking, better documentation, and increasing the visibility of the university in the established ranking systems.

=== Global milestone achievements ===
In 2025, Taiz University made the historic world mark of becoming the first Yemeni university to be ranked in the Times Higher Education ( THE World University Rankings 2026), the biggest global ranking. The university ranked in the 1001-1200 bracket in the world, which shows its performance in terms of teaching, research, knowledge transfer, and the international outlook. In 2025, the university was also listed in the THE Impact Rankings, placing in the 301-400 category of universities worldwide in terms of its performance regarding Sustainable Development Goal 16 (Peace, Justice and Strong Institutions).

=== Regional milestone achievements ===
Taiz University has achieved a steady increase in the Arab regional university rankings. Taiz University was ranked 39th among Arab universities in the Arab University Ranking 2023, published by the Association of Arab Universities, and is one of the best results of a Yemeni institution at the time. The university has made great strides towards the Arab University Ranking 2024, gaining 19th place among Arab universities and this is a huge regional milestone and an indicator of actual institutional changes. In the 2025 Arab University Ranking, Taiz University has been ranked as the 43rd Arab university, continuing to be represented in the top category of Arab universities despite the heightened competition. Also, Taiz University was positioned in the 181-190 bracket in the QS World University Rankings: Arab Region 2026 and in the 126-150 bracket in the Times Higher Education Arab University Rankings 2026, which also gives it a stronger foothold in the region.

=== National milestone achievements ===
On the national level, Taiz University is always placed on the first position in the leading national university in the systems of THE, QS, and Arab associations. Also, the ranking of universities based on EduRank 2025, the university was ranked as one of the top universities in the country and the first in Taiz Governorate, which denotes its academic and research status nationwide.

== Notable alumni ==
- Iftihan al-Mashhari, director of Taiz's sanitation department.

== See also ==
- List of Islamic educational institutions
- List of universities in Yemen
