= Mokha =

Mokha المخا
- City
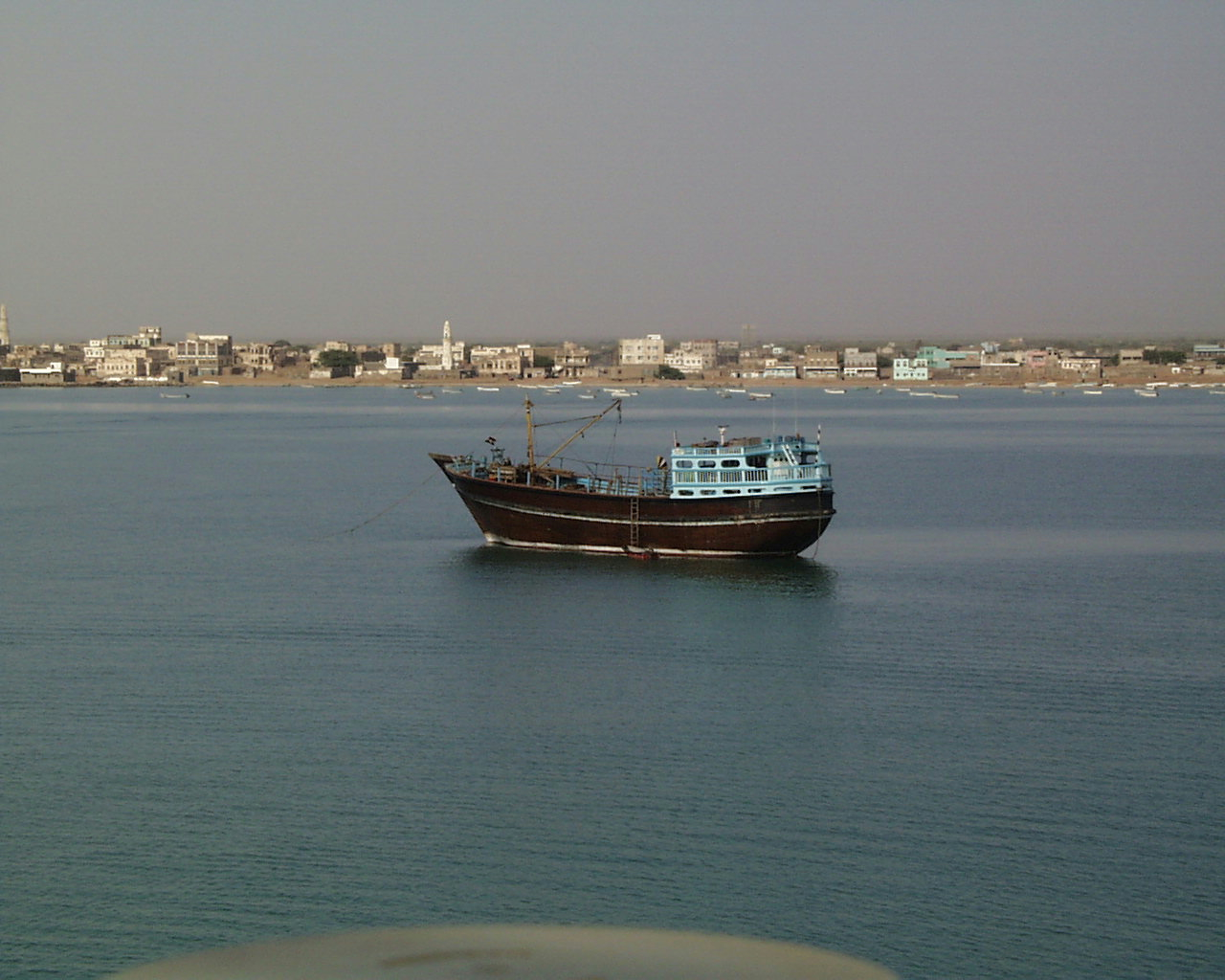
- A dhow near the coast of Mokha

- Location in Yemen
- Coordinates: 13°19′13″N 43°15′00″E
- Country: Yemen
- Governorate: Taiz Governorate
- District: Al-Makha
- Elevation: 13 m (43 ft)

Population (2005)
  - Total: 16,794
- Time zone: UTC+3 (Yemen Standard Time)

Mokha (Arabic: المَخا, romanized: al-Makhā), also spelled Mocha, is a port city on the Red Sea coast of Yemen. Until Aden and al Hudaydah eclipsed it in the 19th century, Mokha was the principal port for Yemen's capital, Sanaa. Long known for its coffee trade, the city gave its name to Mocha coffee.

== Overview ==
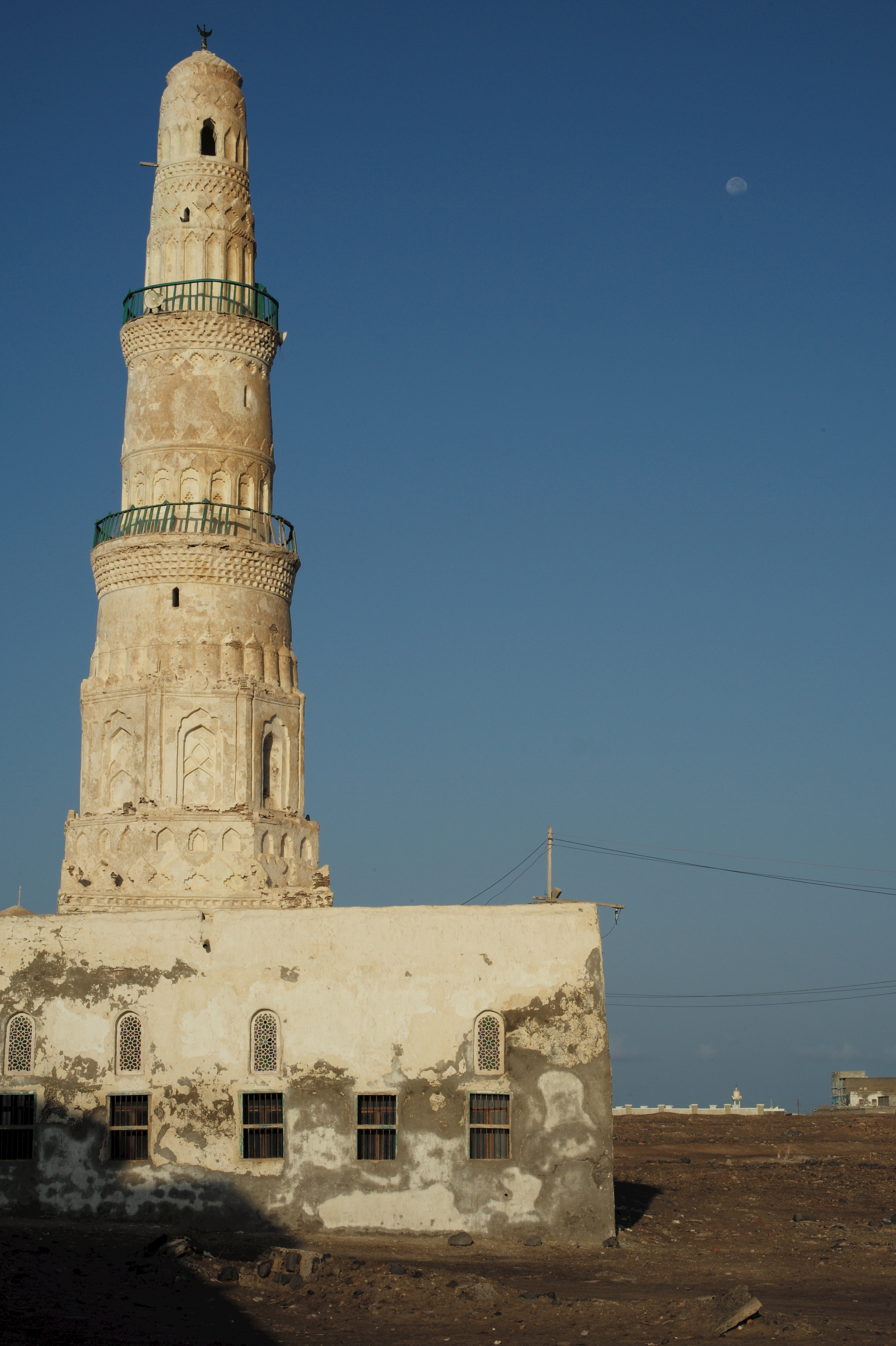
Minaret of Mokha Mosque

Mokha was the major marketplace for many commodities, including, but not limited to coffee (Coffea arabica) from the 16th century through the 19th century. The coffee itself did not grow in Mokha, but was transported from Ethiopia and inland Yemen to the port in Mokha, where it was then shipped abroad. Even after other sources of coffee were found, Mocha beans (also called Sanani or Mocha Sanani beans, meaning from Sana'a) continued to be prized for their distinctive flavor—and remain so even today. Mokha's coffee legacy is reflected in the name of the mocha latte and the Moka pot coffee maker. In Germany, traditional Turkish coffee is known as Mokka.

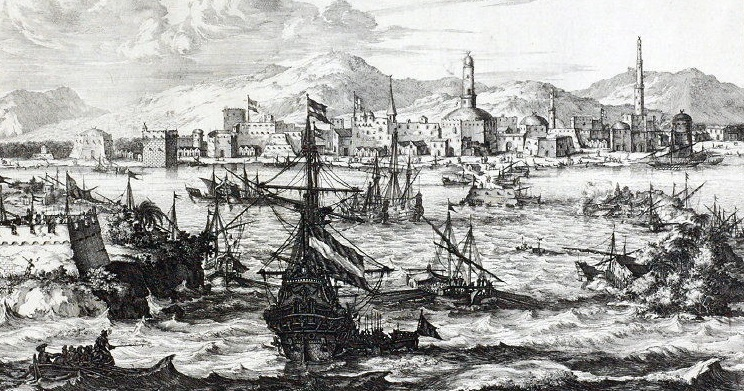
European factories at Mokha in the late 17th century

According to the Portuguese Jesuit missionary Jerónimo Lobo, who sailed the Red Sea in 1625, Mokha was "formerly of limited reputation and trade" but since "the Turkish assumption of power throughout Arabia, it has become the major city of the territory under Turkish domination, even though it is not the Pasha's place of residence, which is two days' journey inland in the city of Sana'a." Lobo adds that its importance as a port was also due to the Ottoman law that required all ships entering the Red Sea to put in at Mokha and pay duty on their cargoes.

Mokha's patron saint is Ali bin Omar al-Shadhili.

== History ==
Based on the Periplus of the Erythrean Sea, many believe that the important ancient emporium of Muza is located near Mokha. The exact location has been debated, either being present-day Mokha itself, the coastal village of Maushij or the inland settlement Mauza'.

Prior to the arrival of the Ottomans in Yemen, in 1538, Mokha was a small fishing village. The Ottomans developed Mokha as a port city, being the first port north of the strait of Bab-el-Mandeb.

Mokha reached its zenith in the first quarter of the 18th century, owing to its trade in coffee. English, Dutch, and French companies maintained factories at Mokha, which remained a major emporium and coffee exporting port until the early 19th century.

The city boasted a stone wall enclosing a citadel, as well as a labyrinth of thatched huts that surrounded the wall from without. Of these, some four hundred accommodated Jewish households that engaged in trade. In the mid-1730s, the vast majority of those occupied in trade in Mokha were the Banyan merchants, who numbered as many as 3,000 to 4,000 men. They chiefly traded in the commodity of coffee, brought by camels to the port of Mokha from places further north and inland, primarily from Bayt al-Faqih. Other trading goods brought to Mokha for export included such spices and commodities as frankincense, myrrh, Dragon's blood, Socotrine aloe, cumin, and the Balm of Gilead. English and Scottish merchants employed with the East India Company established a trading factory at Mokha, receiving at times as many as 50 to 60 camel loads of merchandise in a single delivery.

Passing through Mokha in 1752 and 1756, Remedius Prutky found that it boasted a "lodging-house of the Prophet Muhammad, which was like a huge tenement block laid out in many hundred separate cells where accommodation was rented to all strangers without discrimination of race or religion." He also found a number of European ships in the harbor: three French, four English, two Dutch, and one Portuguese. In the 18th century, a plague killed half of the city's population, from which time the city never really recovered.

In August 1800 the Phoenix visited. William Moffat, her captain, took the opportunity to prepare a chart of the mouth of the Red Sea.

Mokha was very dependent on imported coffee beans from present-day Ethiopia, which was exported by Somali merchants from Berbera across the Gulf of Aden. The Berbera merchants procured most of the coffee from the environs of Harar and shipped them off in their own vessels during the Berbera trading season. According to Captain Haines, who was the colonial administrator of Aden (1839–1854), Mokha historically imported up to two-thirds of their coffee from Berbera-based merchants before the coffee trade of Mokha was captured by British-controlled Aden in the 19th century.

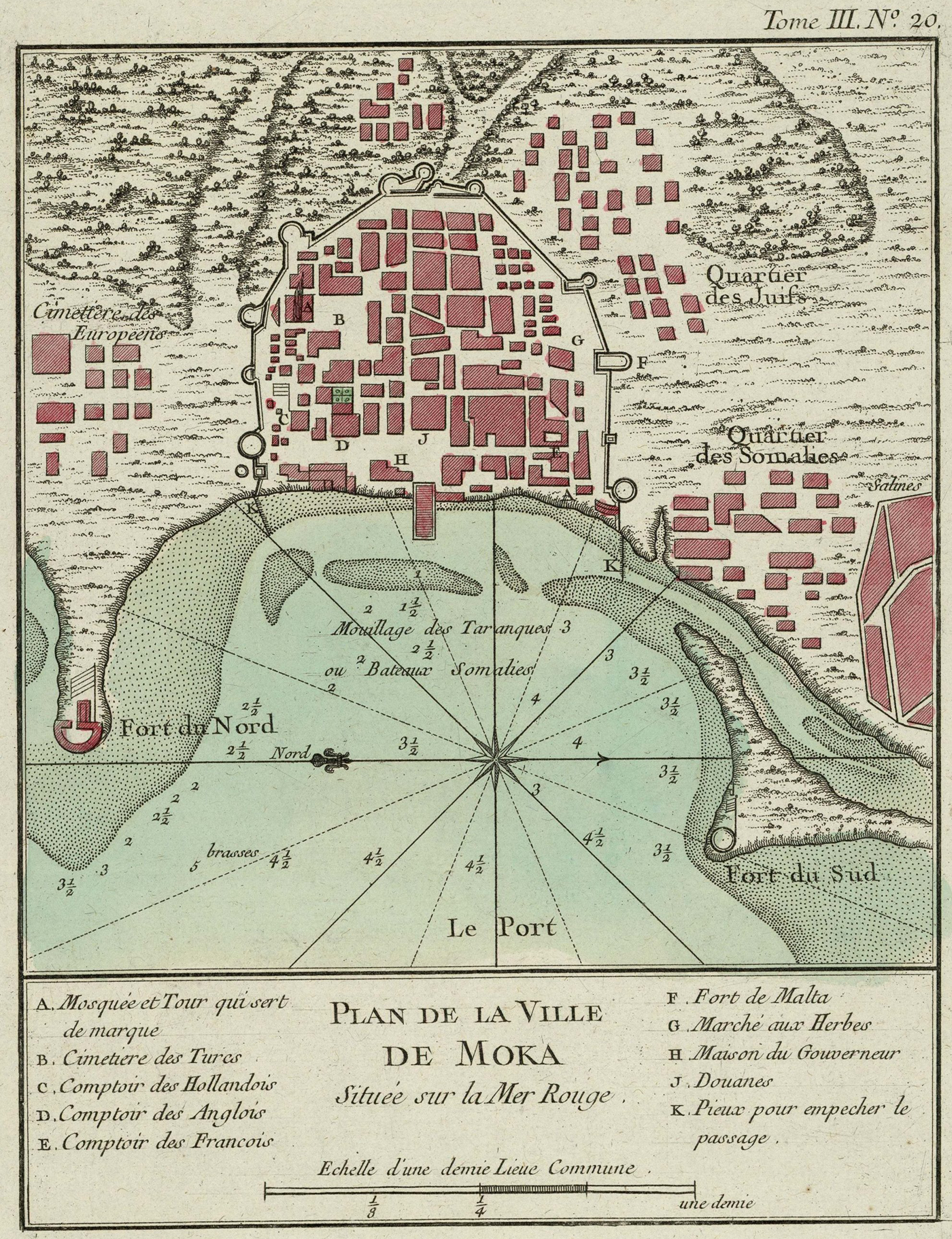
18th-century French plan of Mokha, Yemen. The Somali, Jewish, and European quarters are located outside the citadel.

The Somalis of Berbera also had a navigation act where they excluded Arab vessels and brought the goods and produce of the interior in their own ships to Mokha and other Arabian ports:

Berbera held an annual fair during the cool rain-free months between October and April. This months-long market handled immense quantities of coffee, gum Arabic, myrrh and other commodities. In the early 19th century these goods were almost exclusively handled by Somalis who, Salt says, had "a kind of navigation act by which they exclude the Arab vessels from their ports and bring the produce of their country either to Aden or Mokha in their own dows."

Foreign observers at the time were quick to notice the Somalis who frequented Mokha. The majority of the Somalis arrived seasonally and stayed temporarily to trade in the goods they brought from the interior of the Horn of Africa. They were noted to be industrious in trade as well as keeping to the general peace:

The Samaulies, who inhabit the whole coast from Gardafui to the Straits [Bab-el-Mandeb], and through whose territories the whole produce of the interior of Africa must consequently reach Arabia, have been represented by Mr. Bruce, and many others, as a savage race, with whom it would be dangerous to have connection. I think that this is an unjust accusation, and is sufficiently disproved by the extent of their inland trade, their great fairs, and their large exports in their own vessels. A great number of them live close to Mokha, and are a peaceable inoffensive race.

Amidst the varied classes which are found in this town, the Soumalies, or natives of the opposite coast of Africa, are the most calculated to excite the attention of a stranger. Few reside here permanently, the greater number only remaining until their stock of sheep, gums, or coffee is disposed of.

In 1817, a British lieutenant was allegedly mistreated in Mokha, and the British Indian authorities requested that action be taken. However, the imam's governor turned down the British demand. In response, in December 1820, HMS Topaze and ships and troops belonging to the British East India Company attacked Mokha's North and South Forts, destroying them.

A decade and a half later, Ibrahim Pasha of Egypt would also attack the city and destroy its fortified wall closest to the sea, as well as its citadel. By that time, however, Mokha's trade in its country's precious commodity of coffee grains (Coffea arabica) had already been supplanted by Ethiopia, which was the principal trader of this commodity to North Africa and which sold for a third of the price of the same coffee imported from Arabia.

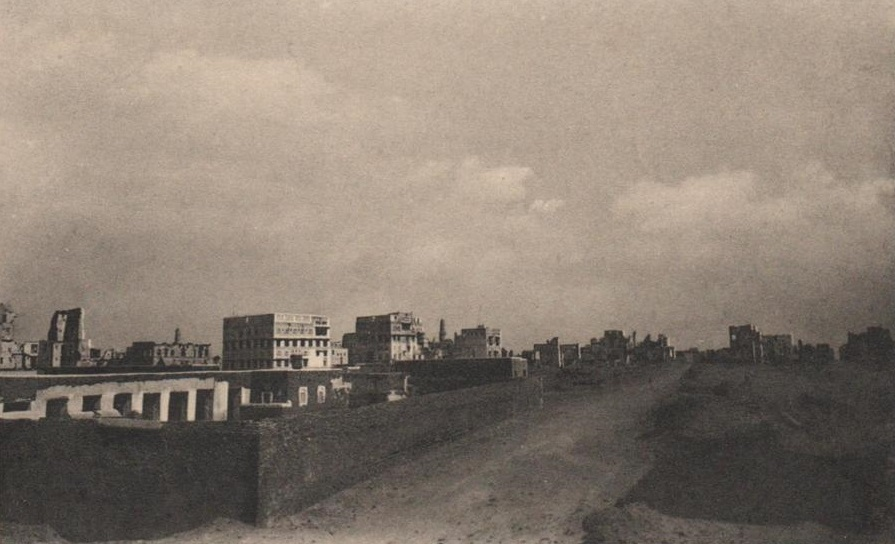
Mokha during 1900–1910

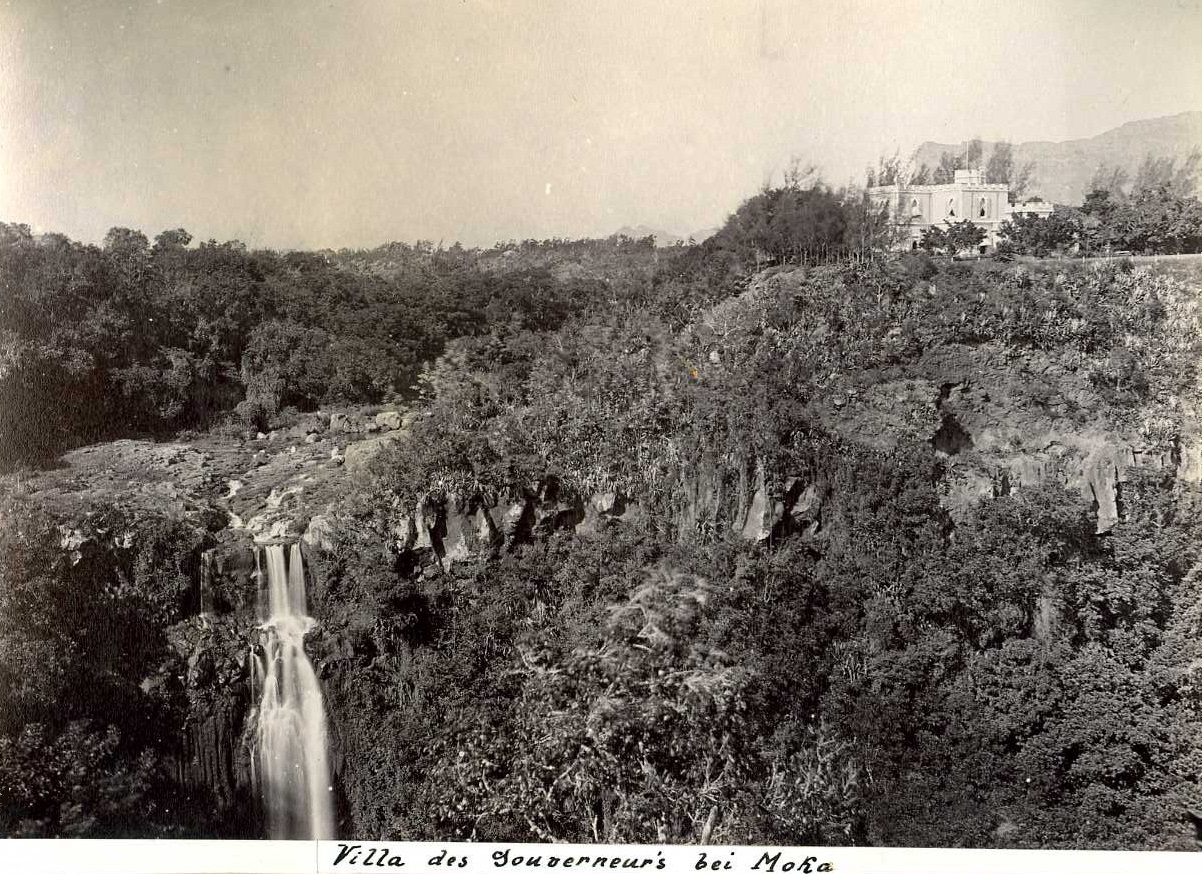
Villa of the Turkish governor, late 19th century

Diplomat Edmund Roberts visited Mokha in the 1830s. He noted that Turkish "rebels" possessed Mokha. The Turks took it over after they left Egypt while being disgruntled with the rule of Muhammad Ali of Egypt. These "rebels", consisting of confederates throughout Arabia, had banded together under one leader named Turkie ben al Mas. Jacob Saphir who visited the city in 1859 wrote about seeing many houses that were vacant of dwellers, although the Turkish governor still dwelt there with a band of soldiers, collecting taxes from local traders and ships visiting the harbor. When the British took control over Aden, the port in Mokha fell into disuse, being replaced by Aden. The general destruction of the city was still prominent as late as 1909, when German explorer and photographer, Hermann Burchardt, wrote of the city Mokha as he saw it: "This card will reach you from one of the most godforsaken little places in Asia. It exceeds all my expectations, with regard to the destruction. It looks like a city entirely destroyed by earthquakes, etc."

Regarding the source of slaves in Mocha, British explorer Ney Elias reported in 1876 that Dankali and Somali groups regularly conducted raids to capture children from the "Habesh", who were subsequently sold as slaves at Mokha. According to Elias, the Galla, particularly those in Shewa, also suffered from these raids, with those enslaved generally fetching lower prices because of their proximity to the coast.

The Moka pot stovetop coffee maker was named after the Yemeni city. At the time Mokha was a famous leading producer and trader of coffee worldwide with a history going back 500 years, and also became known for its unique Yemeni wild Mocha coffee beans.

In 1955, the modern Port of Mokha was established. Today, Mokha is no longer a major trading port, as local coffee farms could not compete with those in former colonies such as Java. The local economy is nowadays largely based on fishing.

Mokha was among the population centers in southern Yemen taken over by the Houthi rebels during their military offensive in March 2015, and was bombed by an Arab coalition in July 2015. The city was attacked by pro-Hadi forces in January 2017 and captured by them the following month. In 2021, an alleged attack by Houthis, using ballistic missiles and drones, caused major damage to Mokha's port. The Associated Press reported that the attack on the port destroyed warehouses that aid organizations had been using. On 10 September 2026, the Houthis retook control of Mokha, after an offensive towards the Strait of Bab al-Mandab. On 5 October 2026, Yemeni government forces claimed that they had recaptured the city. On 6 October 2026, a source on the ground disputed the government claims, stating that neither the city nor the port have been recaptured, and describing the announcement as a "premature" claim of victory and part of an escalating propaganda battle.

== Climate ==
The Köppen-Geiger climate classification system classifies Mokha's climate as hot desert (BWh).

Climate data for Mokha
Month	Jan	Feb	Mar	Apr	May	Jun	Jul	Aug	Sep	Oct	Nov	Dec	Year
Mean daily maximum °C (°F)	31.2 (88.2)	31.5 (88.7)	33.4 (92.1)	35.4 (95.7)	37.6 (99.7)	38.8 (101.8)	39.5 (103.1)	38.9 (102.0)	37.6 (99.7)	35.7 (96.3)	33.2 (91.8)	31.4 (88.5)	35.3 (95.6)
Daily mean °C (°F)	26.7 (80.1)	27.1 (80.8)	28.8 (83.8)	30.6 (87.1)	32.7 (90.9)	34.0 (93.2)	34.6 (94.3)	34.0 (93.2)	33.0 (91.4)	31.0 (87.8)	28.9 (84.0)	27.2 (81.0)	30.7 (87.3)
Mean daily minimum °C (°F)	22.3 (72.1)	22.7 (72.9)	24.2 (75.6)	25.9 (78.6)	27.8 (82.0)	29.2 (84.6)	29.7 (85.5)	29.1 (84.4)	28.4 (83.1)	26.3 (79.3)	24.0 (75.2)	23.0 (73.4)	26.1 (78.9)
Average precipitation mm (inches)	5 (0.2)	2 (0.1)	4 (0.2)	4 (0.2)	2 (0.1)	1 (0.0)	8 (0.3)	14 (0.6)	22 (0.9)	6 (0.2)	2 (0.1)	5 (0.2)	75 (3.1)
Source: Climate-Data.org, altitude: 3m

== See also ==
- Mocha coffee bean
- Caffè mocha
- Almaqah
