= Taiz =

Taiz تَعِزّ
- City
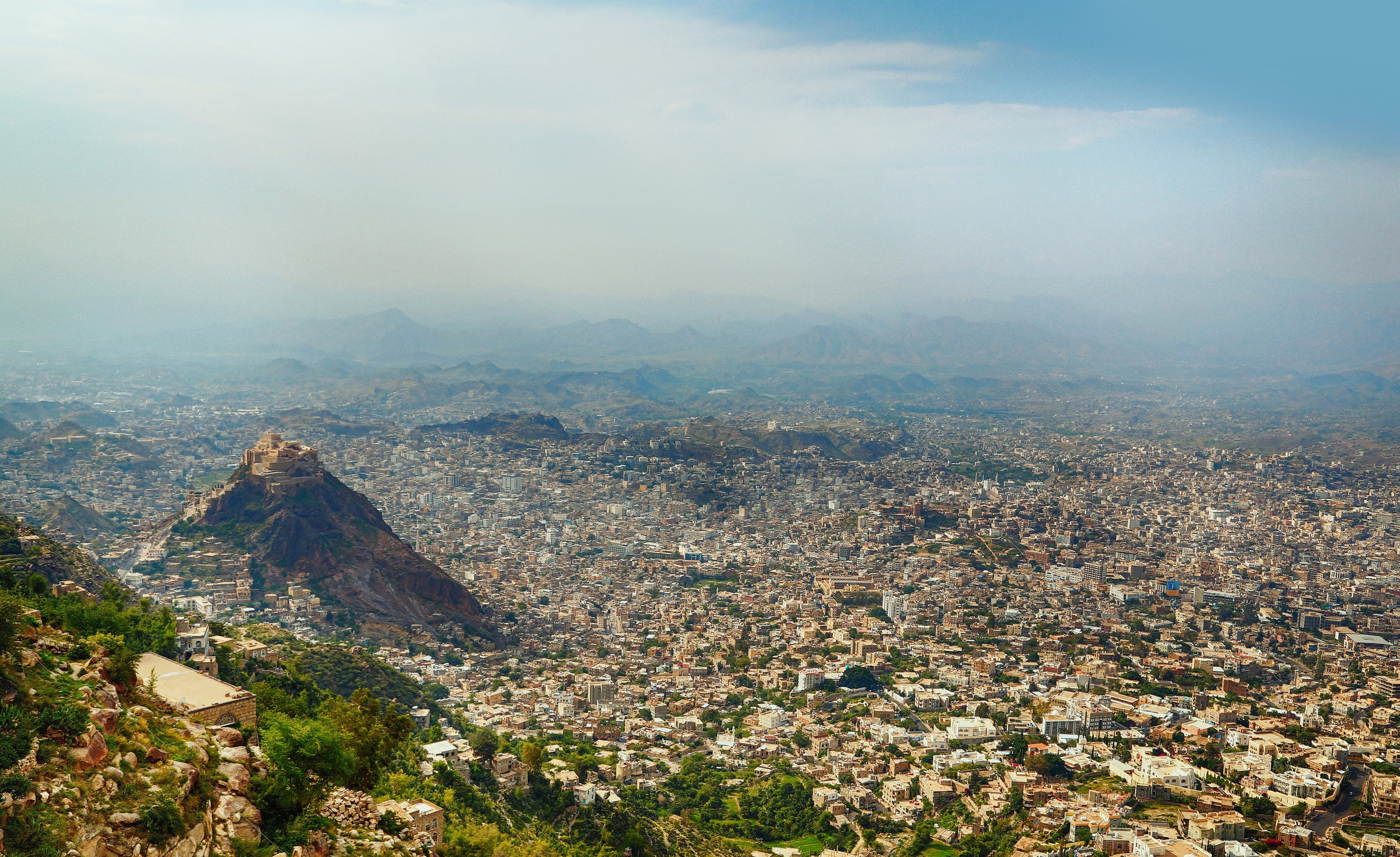
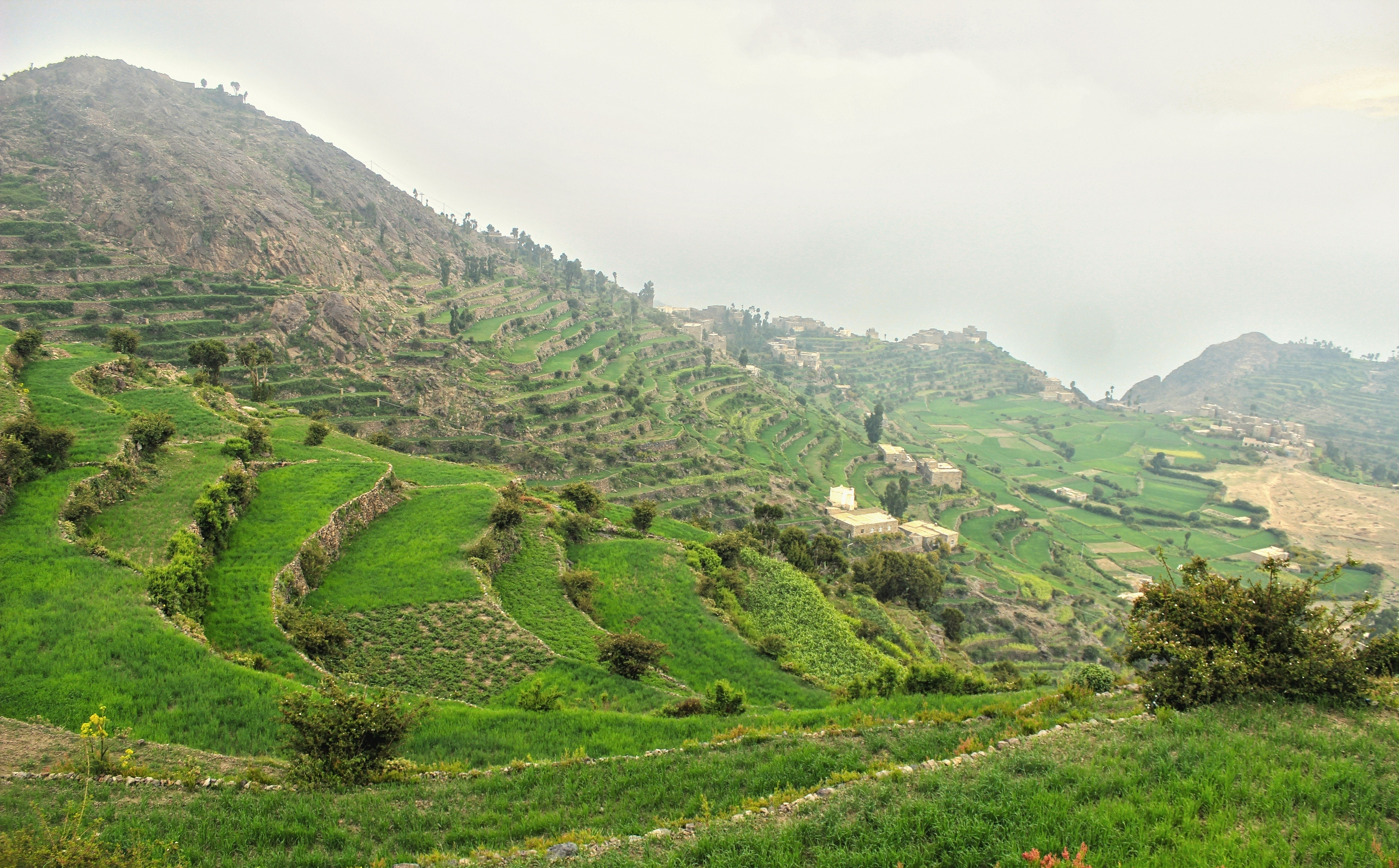
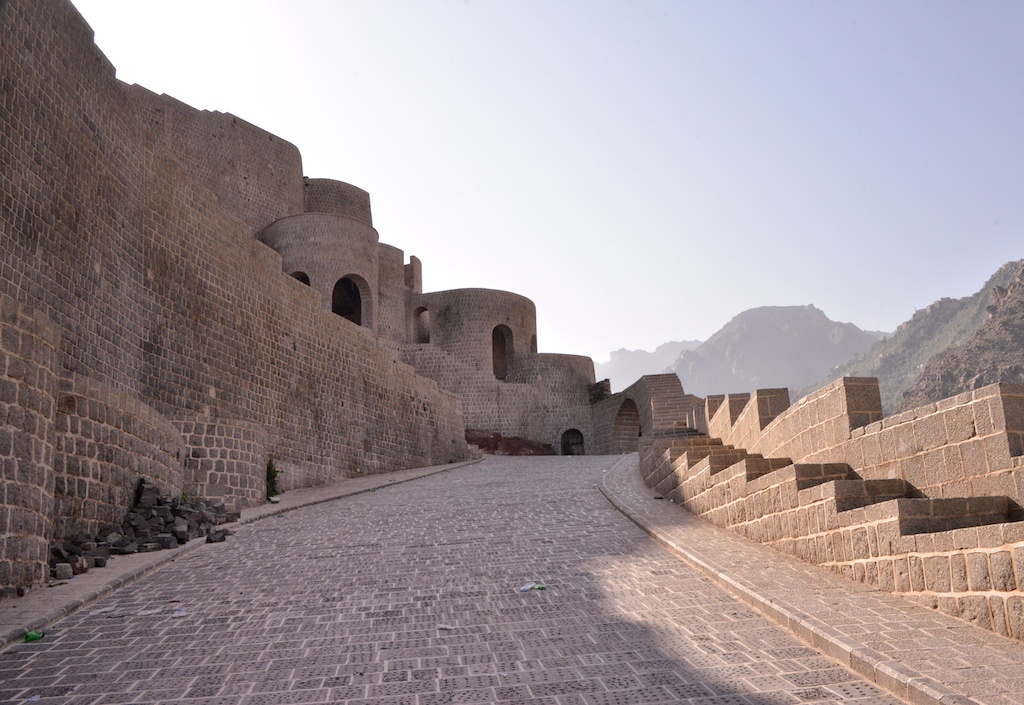
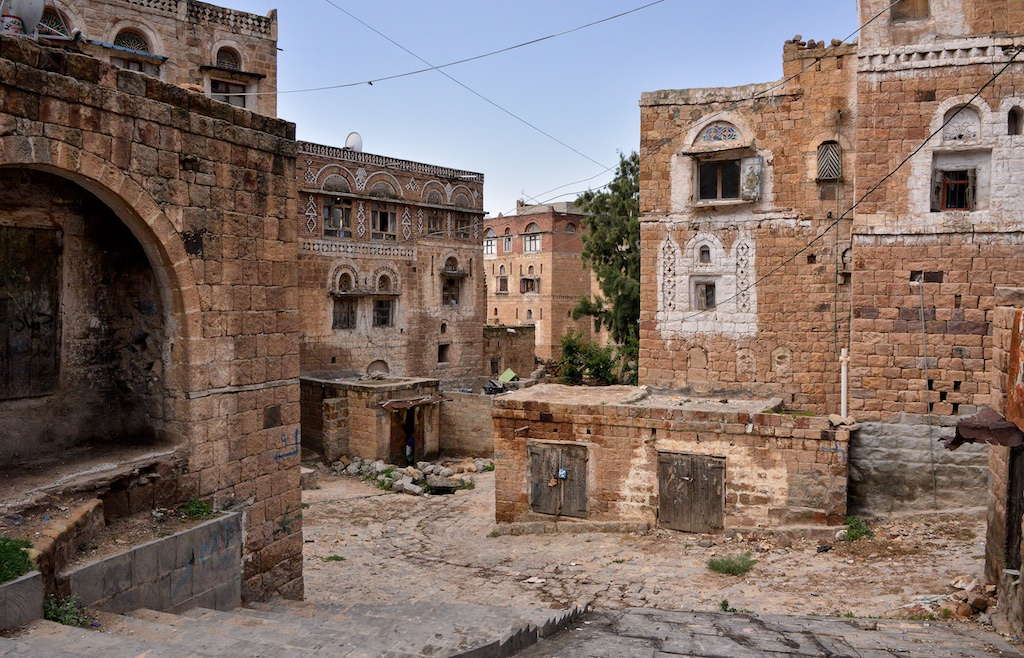
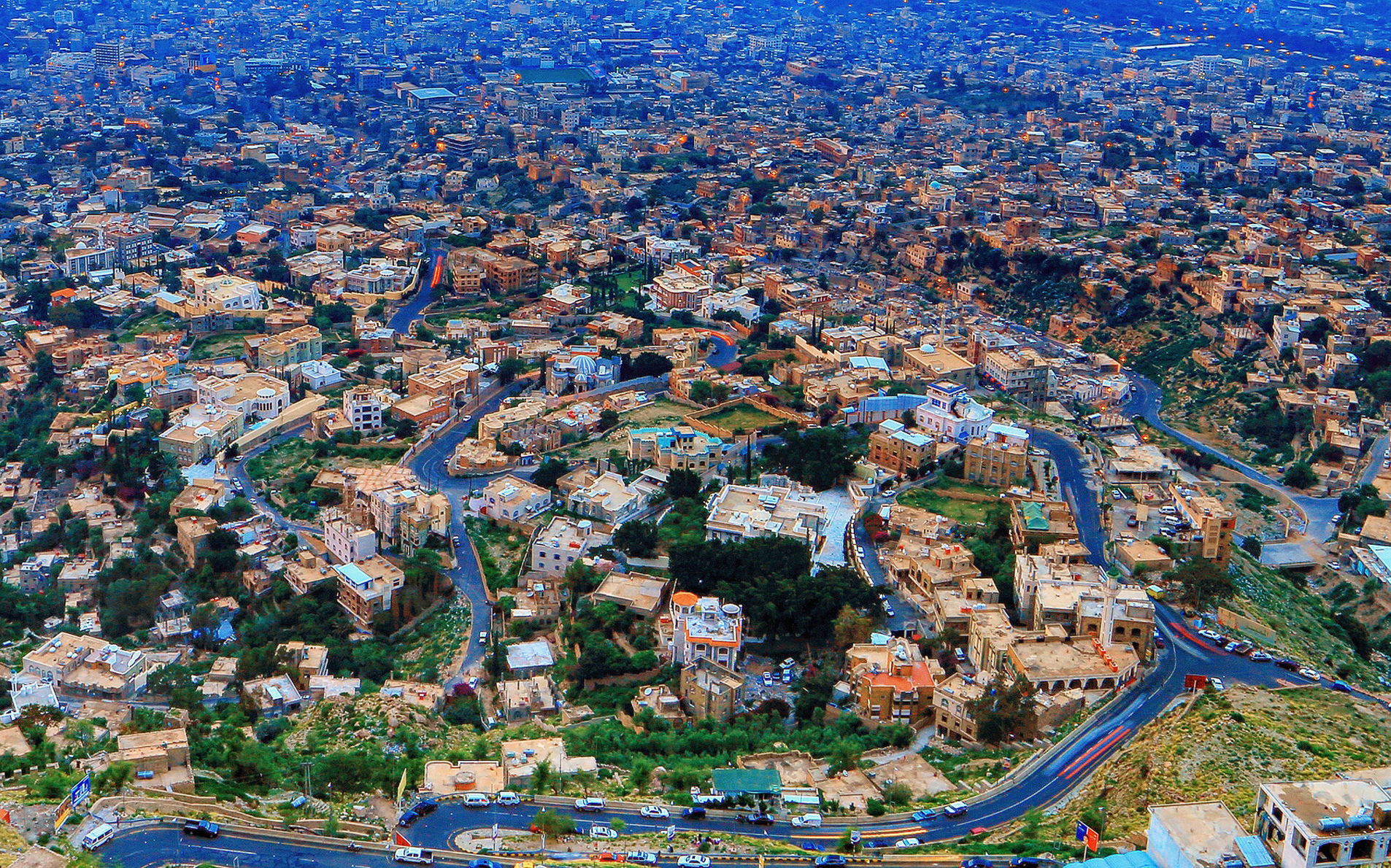
- Overview of Taiz

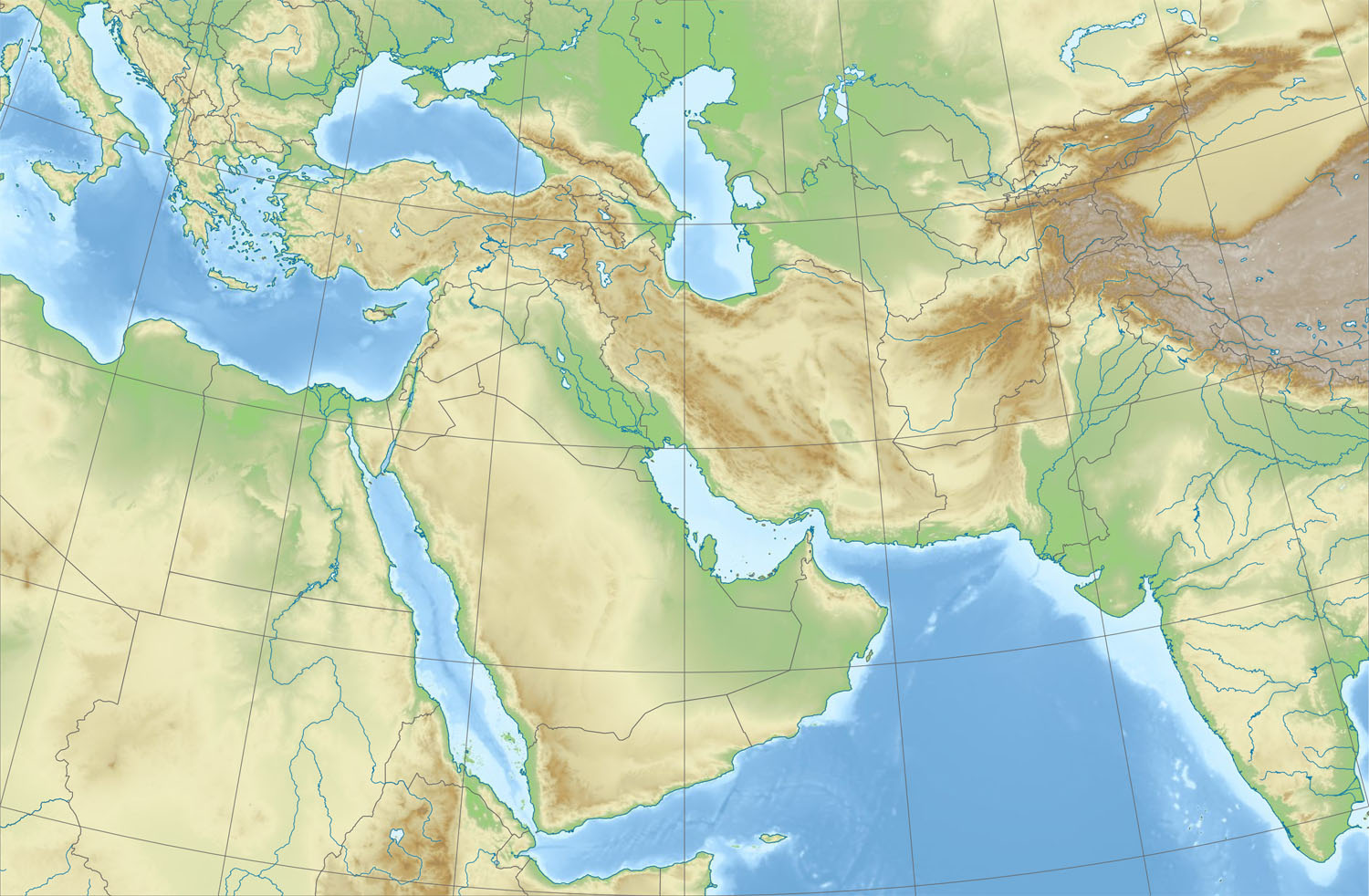
- Location within Yemen Taiz (Middle East)
- Coordinates: 13°34′44″N 44°01′19″E
- Country: Yemen
- Region: Janad
- Governorate: Taiz

Area
  - Total: 42.3 km^{2} (16.3 sq mi)
- Elevation: 1,400 m (4,600 ft)

Population (2004)
  - Total: 458,789 ▲
  - Estimate (2023): 940,600 ▲
  - Density: 22,400/km^{2} (58,000/sq mi)
- Time zone: UTC+03:00 (AST)

Taiz (Arabic: تَعِزّ, romanized: Taʿizz, also spelled Ta'iz, Taizz, and Ta'izz) is a city in southwestern Yemen. It is located in the Yemeni highlands near the port city of Mokha on the Red Sea at an elevation of about 1,400 metres (4,600 ft) above sea level. It is the capital of Taiz Governorate. As of 2023, the city had an estimated population of approximately 940,600 residents, making it the third largest city in Yemen. As of 2026, the city is under siege by Houthi forces.

== History ==
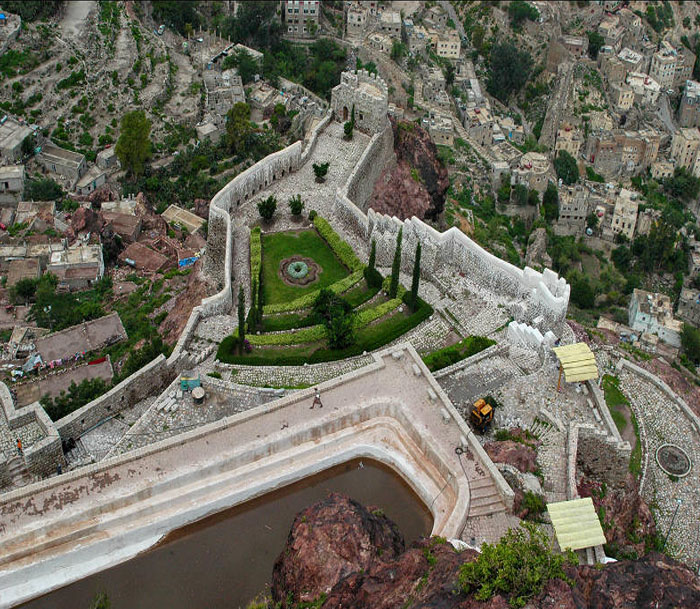
Al-Qahira Castle's garden

=== Medieval ===
The first reference to Taiz in historical sources dates back to the first half of the 12th century CE, when the sultan of the Sulayhid dynasty, Abdullah bin Muhammad al-Sulayhi, built the Al-Qahira Castle. Taiz first became an urbanized area during the days of his brother Ali bin Muhammad al-Sulayhi.

The next historical reference to Taiz mentioned that Queen Arwa al-Sulayhi's minister, Prince Al-Mansur bin Al-Mufaddal bin Abi Al-Barakat, sold many of the country's castles and cities – except for the fortresses of Taiz and Sabr – to the ruler of Aden Al-Zari'i, the preacher Muhammad Ibn Saba, in exchange for 100,000 dinars.

Turan-Shah, the older brother of Saladin, ruled the city after he conquered Yemen in 1173 CE. Turan-Shah built the citadel on the hill overlooking the old city. In 1175 CE, Taiz was made the capital of Yemen as it was incorporated into dominions of the Ayyubid dynasty by Turan-Shah.

Taiz's expansion accelerated when the Rasulid dynasty, which ruled Yemen from 1229 to 1454, took over the city. The second Rasulid King, Almaddhafar (1288 CE), moved his kingdom's capital from Sanaa to Taiz, due to its proximity to Aden. Taiz was said to have reached its golden age during the Rasulid dynasty, whose sultans spent lavishly on palaces, mosques, and madrassas. Its neighborhoods also teemed with schools, guesthouses, markets, orchards, and lush gardens, and the city was considered to be a center for the study of the Shafi'i school of Islamic jurisprudence.

In 1332, Ibn Battutah visited Taiz and described it as one of the largest and most beautiful cities of Yemen:

We went on ... to the town of Taʻizz, the capital of the king of Yemen, and one of the finest and largest towns in that country. Its people are overbearing, insolent, and rude, as is generally the case in towns where kings reside. Taʻizz is made up of three quarters; the first is the residence of the king and his court, the second, called ʽUdayna, is the military station, and the third, called al-Mahálib, is inhabited by the commonalty, and contains the principal market.

Hadım Suleiman Pasha stormed the city of Aden in 1538, while the northern highlands remained independent under the Zaidi Imam Al-Mutawakkil Yahya Sharaf ad-Din. Then the Ottomans, led by Üveys Pasha, took control of the highlands, and Uways Pasha’s forces and the supporters of Al-Mutahhar stormed Taiz and headed north towards Sana’a and took control of it in 1547. The Ottomans faced numerous revolts from the Zaidi imams. Al-Mutahhar bin Yahya Sharaf al-Din managed to invade Sana'a, kill Murad Pasha in Dhamar, and then take control of Taiz and Aden. The Sublime Porte sent Osman Pasha to Taiz in 1569 and besieged the Al-Qahira Castle, but he was unable to capture it. This was followed by the arrival of Sinan Pasha, who recaptured Taiz and other areas from al-Mutahhar's followers. Imam al-Mutahhar died in 1572, and the Ottomans managed to storm Sana'a, Sa'dah, and Najran in 1583.

=== 20th century ===
Yahya Muhammad Hamid ed-Din was the Imam of the Zaidis in Yemen, and upon the departure of the Ottomans, he established the Mutawakkilite Kingdom of Yemen in 1918. He adopted an isolationist policy out of fear that his country would fall under the authority of warring colonial powers following World War I, and also to keep the kingdom away from the nationalist movements that emerged in the Arab region during that period.

Taiz remained a walled city until 1948, when Imam Ahmed made it the second capital of Yemen, allowing for expansion beyond its fortified wall. In the 1960s, the first purified water system in Yemen was opened in Taiz. In 1962, state administrations moved back to Sanaa.

=== Yemeni uprising and war ===
During the Yemeni Revolution, fighting in Taiz resulted in anti-government forces seizing control of the city from president Ali Abdullah Saleh. As part of the 2015 Yemeni Civil War, on 22 March the Houthis and forces loyal to former president Ali Abdullah Saleh took the city in the aftermath of their coup d'état in Sanaa. The city became the site of a military confrontation between Houthis and the forces loyal to Abd Rabbuh Mansur Hadi. The city was effectively under siege and the United Nations warned of an "extreme and irreversible" food shortage if fighting continued. In August 2015, Yemeni Member of Parliament Muhammad Muqbil Al-Himyari reported Houthi attacks on civilians in Taiz and appealed for help on Suhail TV (Yemen).

The 2015 confrontation expanded into a military campaign for control of this strategic city. Despite ceasefires and prisoner swaps, the city has been described as a "volatile front line". The frontline run through the city from east to west, and journeys could take 5 hours. Once known as the "cultural capital of Yemen", the war has bestowed a new name on Taiz, the "city of snipers". As of 2018, at least seven journalists had been killed in Taiz. The fighting has also devastated Taiz's architectural heritage: Cairo Citadel was damaged by airstrikes in 2015, and the Taiz Museum was shelled in 2016, causing its manuscripts to be destroyed.

== Geography ==
=== Climate ===
Taiz has a hot semi-arid climate (Köppen climate classification: BSh), bordering both a humid subtropical climate (Cwa) and a subtropical highland climate (Cwb). The average daily temperature high during August is 32.5 °C (90.5 °F). Annual rainfall of Taiz is around 660 millimetres (26 in), but on Jabal Sabir it is probably around 1,000 millimetres (39.4 in) per year.

Climate data for Taiz
Month	Jan	Feb	Mar	Apr	May	Jun	Jul	Aug	Sep	Oct	Nov	Dec	Year
Mean daily maximum °C (°F)	24.3 (75.7)	26.4 (79.5)	27.9 (82.2)	28.3 (82.9)	29.0 (84.2)	31.3 (88.3)	32.5 (90.5)	31.7 (89.1)	31.3 (88.3)	31.1 (88.0)	27.6 (81.7)	26.1 (79.0)	29.0 (84.2)
Daily mean °C (°F)	17.7 (63.9)	19.9 (67.8)	22.1 (71.8)	23.6 (74.5)	24.3 (75.7)	25.6 (78.1)	26.4 (79.5)	25.4 (77.7)	24.6 (76.3)	24.0 (75.2)	21.7 (71.1)	20.0 (68.0)	22.9 (73.2)
Mean daily minimum °C (°F)	11.1 (52.0)	13.3 (55.9)	16.3 (61.3)	18.8 (65.8)	19.5 (67.1)	19.9 (67.8)	20.2 (68.4)	19.1 (66.4)	17.8 (64.0)	16.9 (62.4)	15.7 (60.3)	13.9 (57.0)	16.9 (62.4)
Average rainfall mm (inches)	9 (0.4)	12 (0.5)	37 (1.5)	68 (2.7)	89 (3.5)	73 (2.9)	60 (2.4)	89 (3.5)	110 (4.3)	91 (3.6)	17 (0.7)	5 (0.2)	660 (26.2)
Source 1: Hydrological Sciences
Source 2: Journal of Environmental Protection

== Landmarks ==
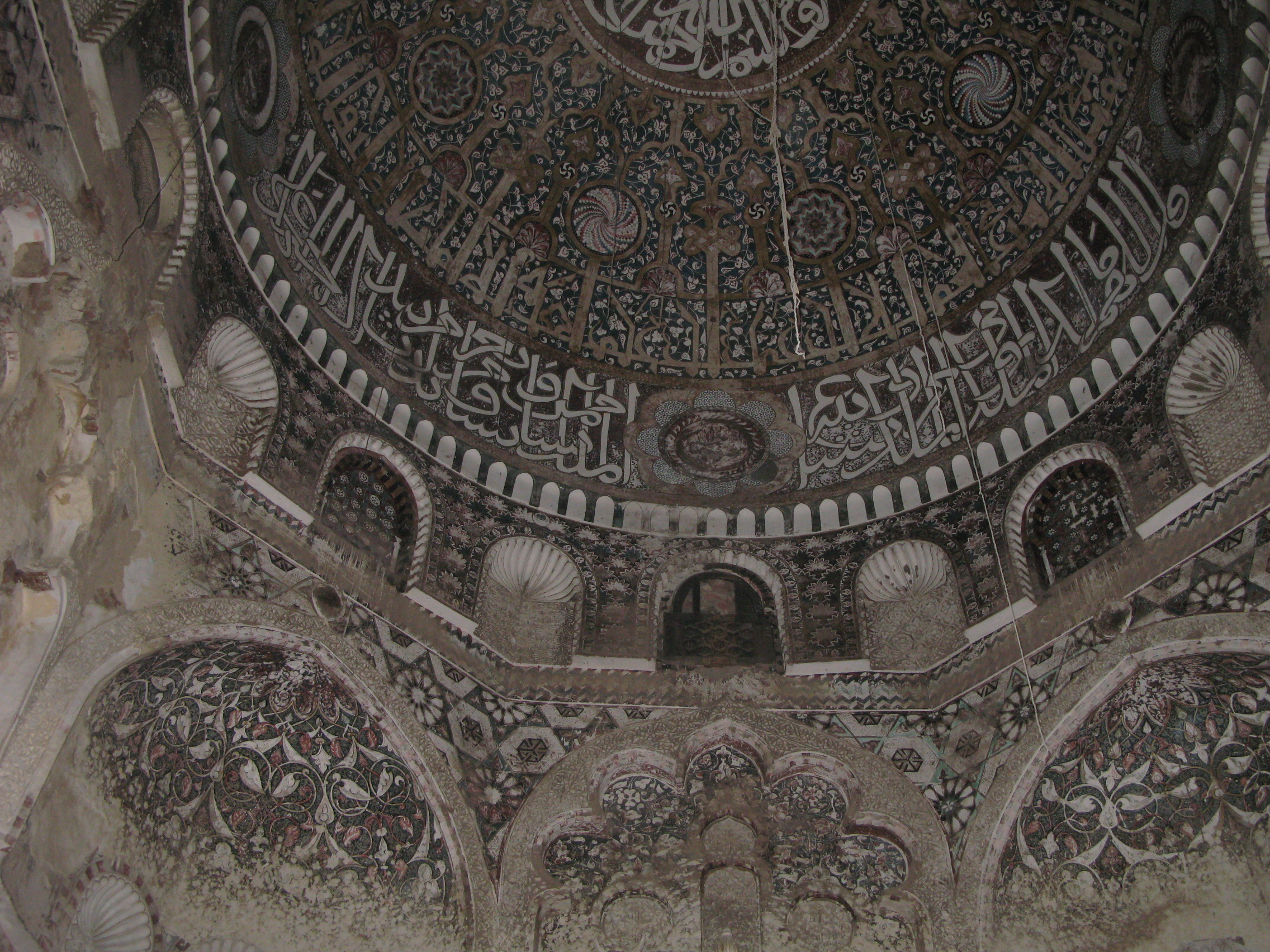
Ashrafiya Mosque

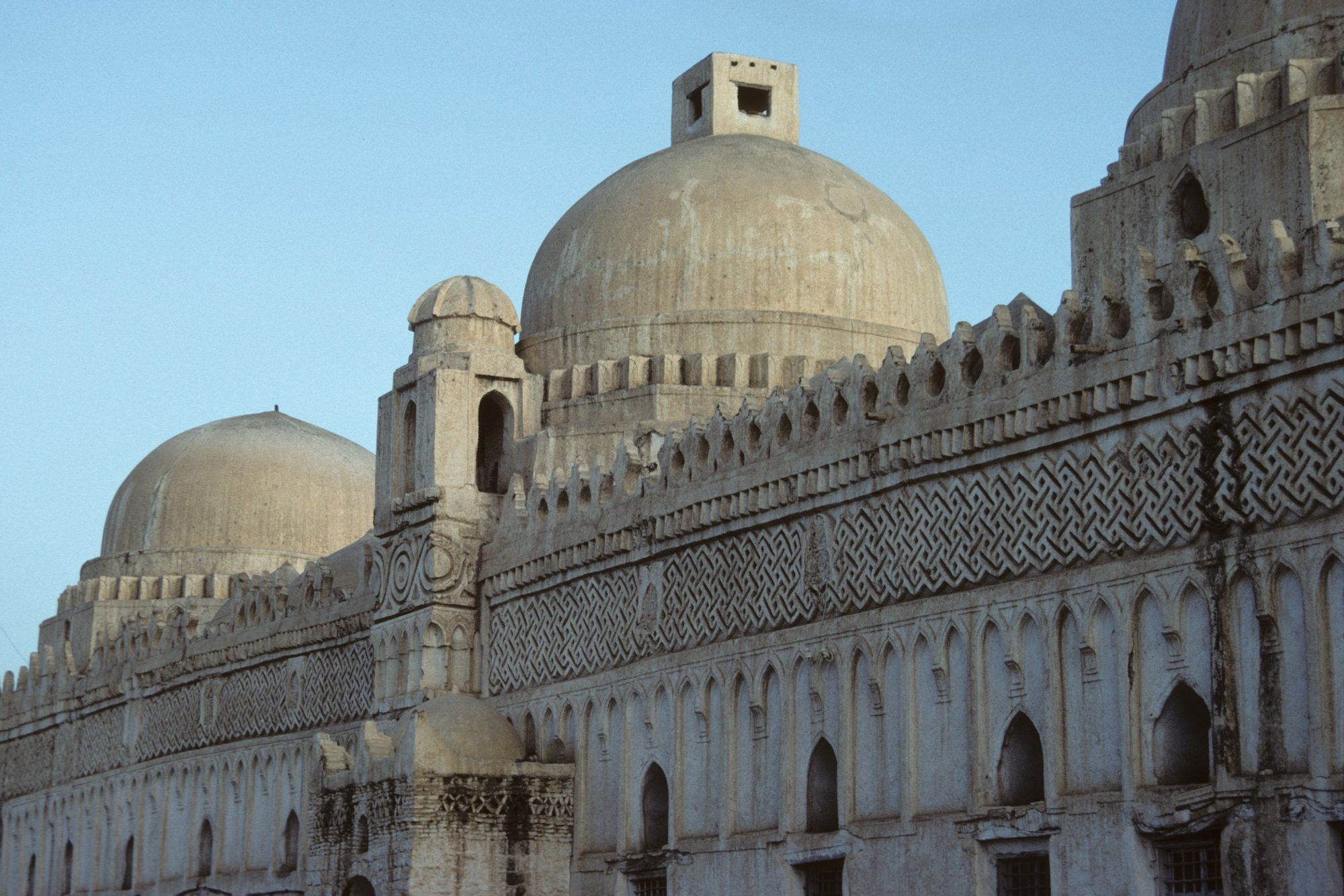
Mudhaffar Mosque

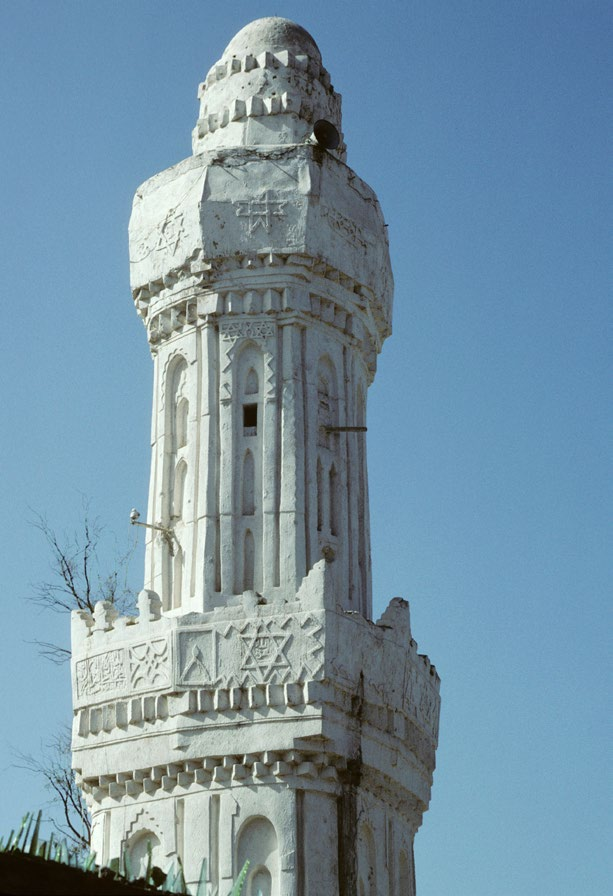
The Mua'tabiya Mosque

The city has many old quarters, with houses that are typically built with brown bricks, and mosques that are usually whitewashed. The most famous mosques in the city are the Ashrafiya, the Mua'tabiya Mosque, and the Mudhaffar Mosque. Other landmarks include Cairo Citadel, which looms above the city from the south, and the governor's palace, which rests on top of a mountain spur 450 m (1,480 ft) above the city centre. Taiz is also home to one of the best-known mountains in Yemen, Jabal Saber.

== Economy ==
Historically, the mountainous city of Taiz was known for coffee production. The Mocha coffee produced in Taiz was considered some of the finest in the region in the early 20th century. Today, coffee remains a major part of the economy but mango, pomegranate, citrus, banana, papai, vegetables, cereals, onions, and qat are also grown in the surrounding landscapes. Taiz is also known for its cheese. It is produced in rural areas like Araf, Awshaqh, Akhuz, Bargah, Barah, Jumah, Mukyas, Suayra, Kamb and Hajda and sold in Bab al-Kabeer and Bab Musa markets. Industries in the city of Taiz include cotton-weaving, tanning and jewelry production.

However, since the outbreak of the civil war in 2015, Taiz's economy has been devastated by the fighting and the city's siege by Houthi rebels. Many goods are in short supply, and must be smuggled in across steep mountain roads to avoid sniper fire.

== Transport ==
Taiz has many road connections with the rest of the country. However, as of January 2023, most roads to and from Taiz are controlled by the Houthis, who are besieging the city as part of the Yemeni Civil War. The city is served by Taiz International Airport. With the closing of this airport due to the civil war, the only way into and out of the city is via cars or small buses that goes through a longer and less serviced roads than the normal roads before the war. However, There was an agreement recently towards open roads in Taiz that will save time and effort for people to go in and out the city.

== Zoo ==
Like Sanaa Zoo, this zoo held fauna caught in the wild, such as the Arabian leopard, as well as exotic animals such as African lions and gazelles. Due to the civil war, however, many of the animals held at the zoo have become sick or died due to lack of food.

== Notable people ==
- Tawakkol Karman, Yemeni Nobel Laureate, journalist, politician and human rights activist
- Amat Al Alim Alsoswa, journalist and Yemen's first female ambassador
- Reham al-Badr, human rights activist
- Abdel Karim al-Khaiwani, politician and human rights activist
- Bushra al-Maqtari, writer and activist
- Ali al-Muqri, novelist
- Maeen Abdulmalik Saeed, Yemeni prime minister
- Arwa Othman, Yemeni writer, journalist, human rights activist and former Minister of Culture
- Hisham Sharaf, Yemeni minister of foreign affairs
- Zayd Mutee' Dammaj, writer
- Sabri Al-Haiki, painter, critic and poet
- Adam Saif, actor
- Iftihan al-Mashhari, director of the city's sanitation department

== See also ==
- Sarawat Mountains
- Haraz Mountains
- Ahmed Fadl Al-Qomandan
