= Ghubbah (Socotra) =

- Town
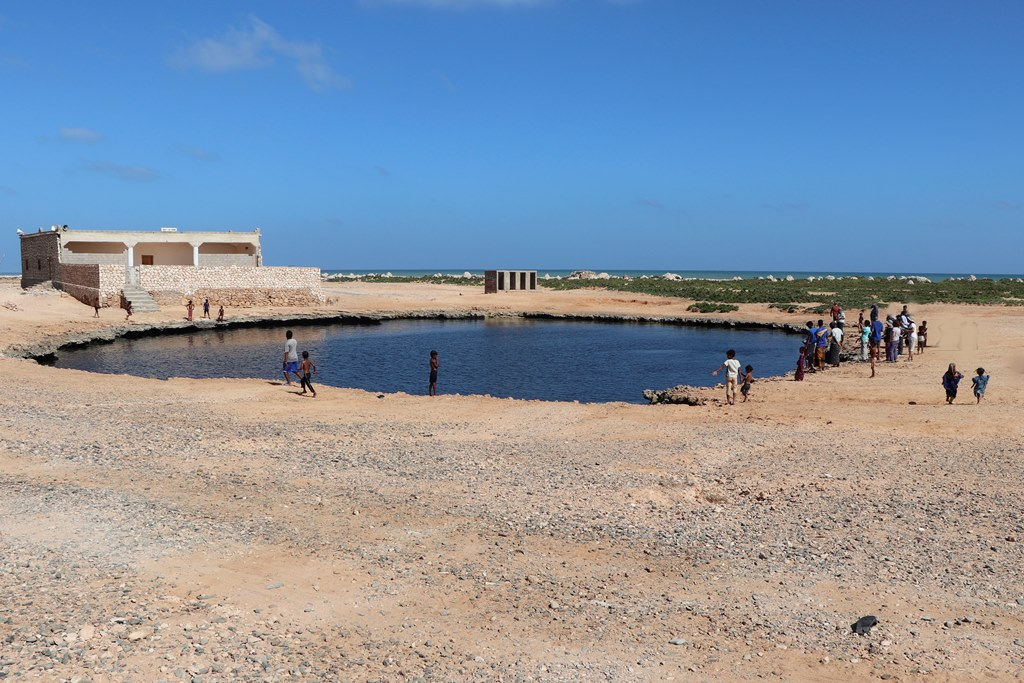

- Location within Yemen
- Coordinates: 12°36′27″N 53°47′04″E
- Country: Yemen
- Governorate: Socotra Governorate
- Island: Socotra
- District: Hidaybu District
- Time zone: UTC+03:00 (Asia)

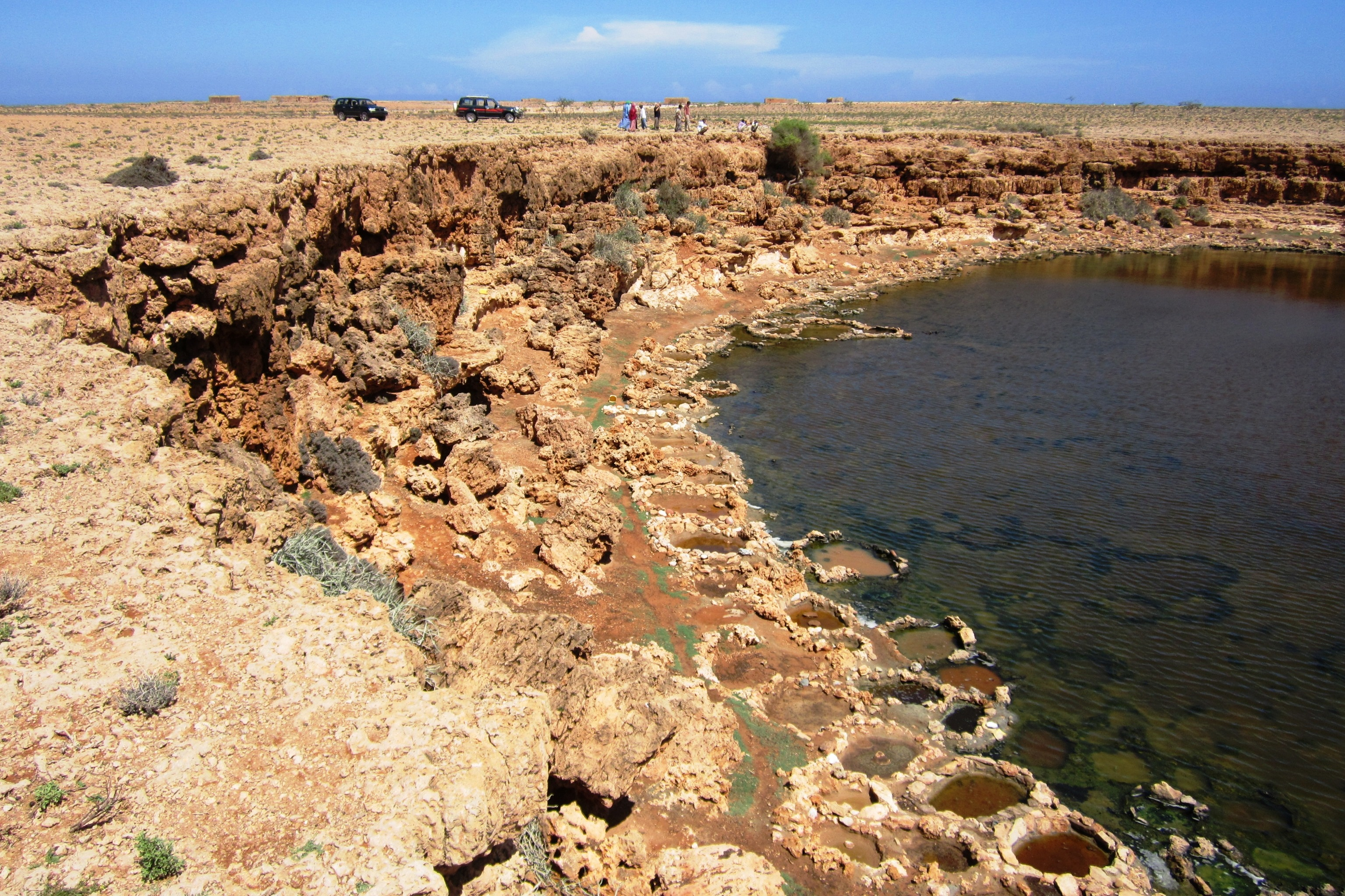
Sink hole with salt evaporation pans

Ghubbah (Arabic: غبة, romanized: Ghubbah; alt. Gubba or Ghoba) is a village on the main island of Socotra, Yemen (situated south-southeast of the Arabian Peninsula and Yemeni mainland, off of the northeastern Somali coast), in the Hidaybu District. Located on the northwestern coast, halfway between Hadibu and Qulensya, Ghubbah is situated on a barren, coralline plateau 5 m above sea level. The settlement has a cenote located directly between its Awdaf (Arabic: عوداف) neighbourhood and the sea. It is of a deep blue colour and has an oval shape, measuring 50 m x 40 m, and a depth of 37 m. Fresh water feeds into it from the sea.

Another pool is located just south of the main road, bypassing the village. It is a brackish and muddy, salty sinkhole of larger dimensions, 120 m x 90 m around, but barely 2 m deep. On the shallow, surrounding ledges, the villagers have built small salt evaporation pans for salt winning. This water pool is also dubbed Socotra Crater, as some scholars maintain that it is meteoric in origin. However, this theory has proven controversial.

In the region of Ghubbah, ongoing initiatives have been enacted to replant and restore the natural areas of grey mangrove (Avicennia marina).

== See also ==
- List of cities in Socotra archipelago
