= Suq, Yemen =

Suq
- Town
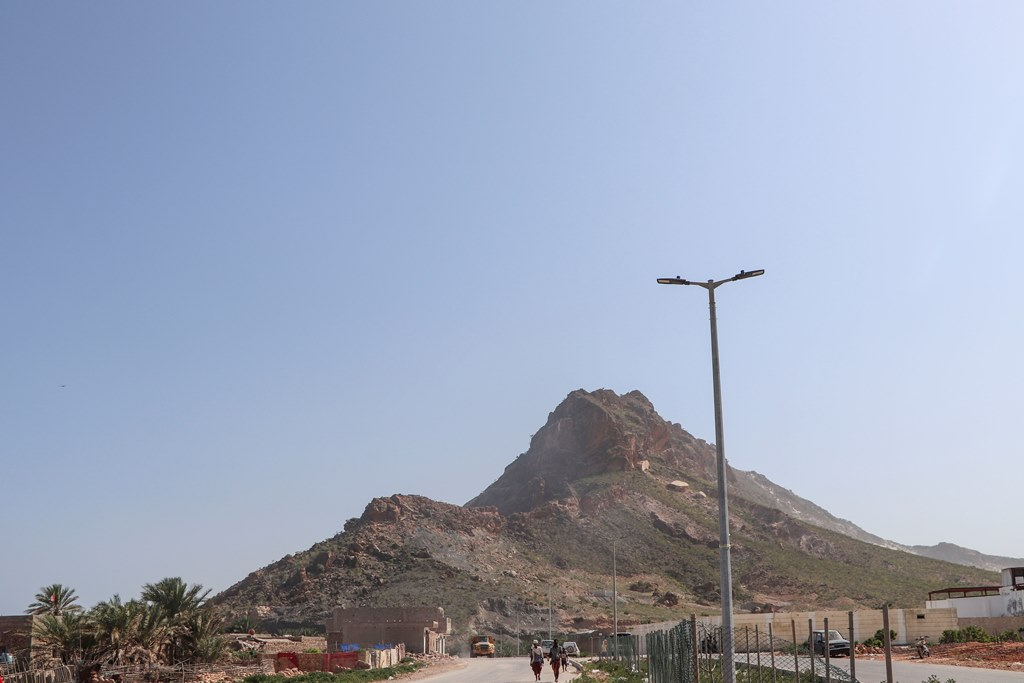
- Jabel Hawari

- Location within Yemen
- Coordinates: 12°39′57″N 54°3′36″E
- Country: Yemen
- Governorate: Socotra Governorate
- Island: Socotra
- District: Hidaybu District
- Time zone: UTC+03:00 (Asia)

Suq (Soqotri: شيق, romanized: Shiq; Arabic: سوق) is a town on the north-eastern coast of the island of Socotra, Yemen. It is located in the Hidaybu District on the eastern end of the Hadibu plain.

Above the village, perched on a rocky outcrop on top of Jabel Hawari there are the remains of a stone-built fort, strongly contested between Portuguese and the Mahra Sultanate in the 16th century. The remains of the fortress are still showing sections of well-trimmed blocks and a tower at the north-western corner of the structure.

At that time Suq was the main settlement of Socotra as well as anchorage point for ships. From the beginning of the 17th century onwards Suq was replaced as the capital of Socotra by Hadibu, located a few kilometers to the west. Today, Suq is a small village.

== History ==
In 1507, a Portuguese fleet commanded by Tristão da Cunha with Afonso de Albuquerque landed at Suq and captured the port from the Mahra after a stiff battle. The architect Tomás Fernandes started to build a fortress at Suq, the Forte de São Miguel de Socotorá. But in 1511 the Portuguese abandoned the island and the Mahra sultans regained control of Suq.

== Archaeology ==
South-west of the modern town of Suq, a limestone outcropping contains petroglyphs with designs including cruciform shapes, foot-symbols and scripts.

Two km south of Suq is located the Hajrya site, the ruins of a pre-Islamic settlement.

== See also ==
- List of cities in Socotra archipelago
