= Erissel =

- Town
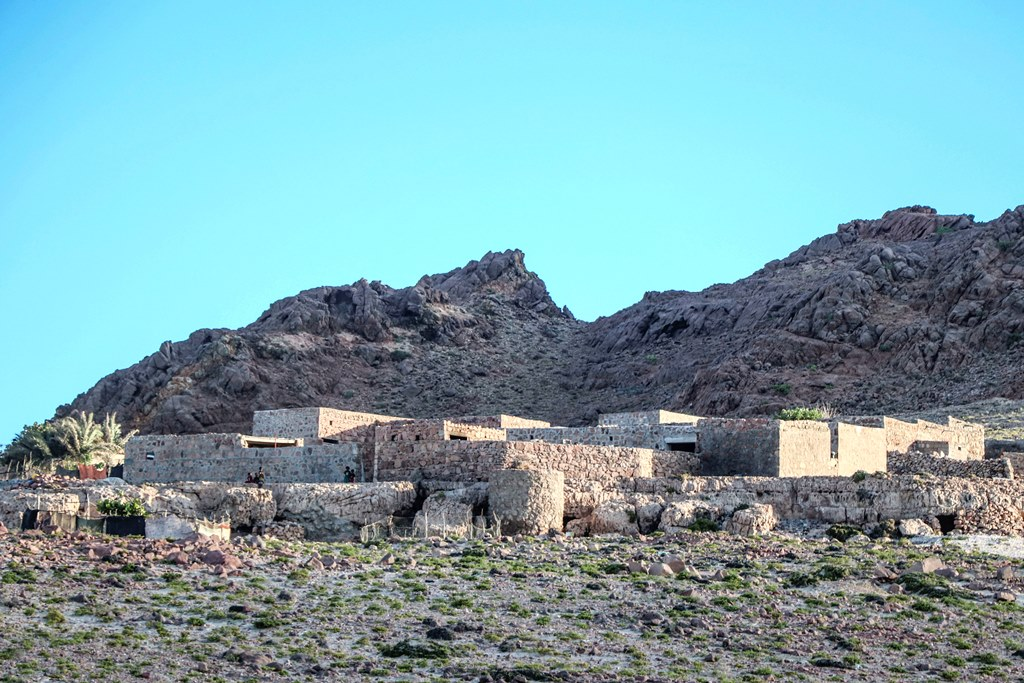

- Location within Yemen
- Coordinates: 12°32′48″N 54°31′06″E
- Country: Yemen
- Governorate: Socotra Governorate
- Island: Socotra
- District: Hidaybu District

Population
  - Total: 400
- Time zone: UTC+03:00 (Asia)

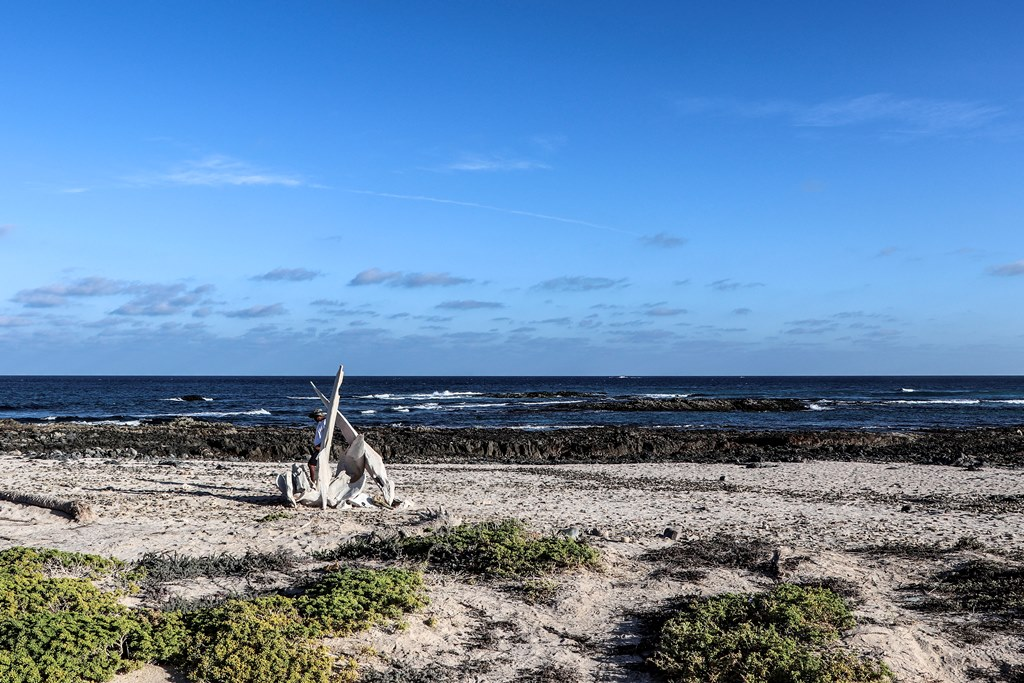
Ras Erissel

Erissel (Arabic: أرسل, romanized: Irsal; alt. Irsal) is a fishing village on the main island of Socotra, Yemen. Located in the Hidaybu District its approximate population is 400.

Erissel lies next to Ras Irissel or Rhiy di-Irīsal, the easternmost point of Socotra, where the Indian Ocean meets the Arabian Sea. On the narrow spur of the cape, the bedrock of the island outcrops as amphibolitic rocks.

The cape is a place where ships have been colliding with rocks for centuries.

== See also ==
- List of cities in Socotra archipelago
