= Qadub =

- Town
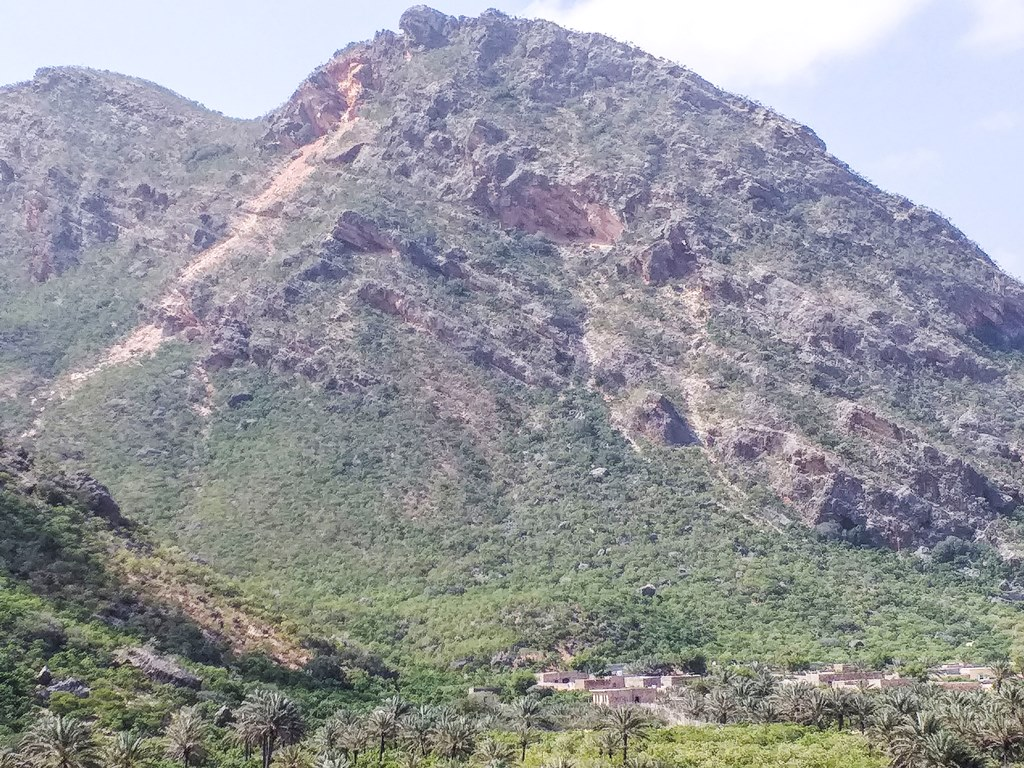
- Nicknames: Kathub, Qadhub, Qadib
- Location within Yemen
- Coordinates: 12°30′36″N 53°55′12″E
- Country: Yemen
- Governorate: Socotra Governorate
- Island: Socotra
- District: Hidaybu District

Population
  - Total: 929
- Time zone: UTC+03:00 (Asia)

Qād̨ub (Arabic: قاضب, romanized: Qāḍub) - and also known as Kathub, Qadhub, or Qadib - is a town on the island of Socotra. It is located in the Hidaybu District close to Socotra Airport. With a population of 929 it is the third largest town of Socotra.

== See also ==
- List of cities in Socotra archipelago
