= Da'ira, Yemen =

Da'ira
- Populated place
- Location in Yemen
- Coordinates: 12°26′00″N 54°10′00″E
- Country: Yemen
- Time zone: UTC+3 (Arabia Standard Time)

Da'ira is a populated place in the southeast of the island of Socotra in Yemen.

== See also ==
- List of cities in Socotra archipelago
