= Asthma (disambiguation) =

Asthma is a predisposition of the respiratory system in which the airways are predisposed to bronchoconstriction.

Asthma may also refer to:

- Occupational asthma, predisposition of the respiratory system caused by occupational hazards
- Asthma, a song by P.O.D. from their 2003 album Payable on Death
- Asthma (film)

== See also ==
- Asma (disambiguation)
