= List of cities in Socotra archipelago =

The following are towns and cities in the island archipelago, Socotra.

== Socotra ==
- Hadibu
- Qalansiyah
- Qād̨ub
- Qashio
- Jo'oh
- Da'ira
- Steroh
- Mori
- Nait
- Di Asmo
- Erissel
- Ghubbah
- Suq

== Abd al Kuri ==
- Kinshia
- Kilmia

== See also ==
Google Maps: Socotra
