= Asma =

Asma may refer to:

- Asma (given name), list of people with the given name
- Asma, Bozdoğan, a village in the district of Bozdoğan, Aydın Province, Turkey
- Asma, Socotra, a village and ridge on the island of Socotra, Yemen
- Tropical Storm Asma (2008), in the South-West Indian Ocean

== See also ==
- Aasmah Mir
- ASMA (disambiguation)
- Asthma, inflammatory disease of the airways characterized by symptoms such as wheezing and shortness of breath
