= Di Asmo =

Asma
- Village
- Map showing location of Di Asmo
- Coordinates: 12°30′11″N 54°3′20″E
- Country: Yemen
- Territory: Socotra
- Elevation: 400–450 m (1,310–1,480 ft)

Di Asmo, also known as Asma, is a settlement in the foothills of Hajhir, Socotra, Yemen. The name is also given to a nearby ridge.

== See also ==
- List of cities in Socotra archipelago
