= Socotra Airport =

Airport in Yemen

Socotra Airport مطار سقطرى
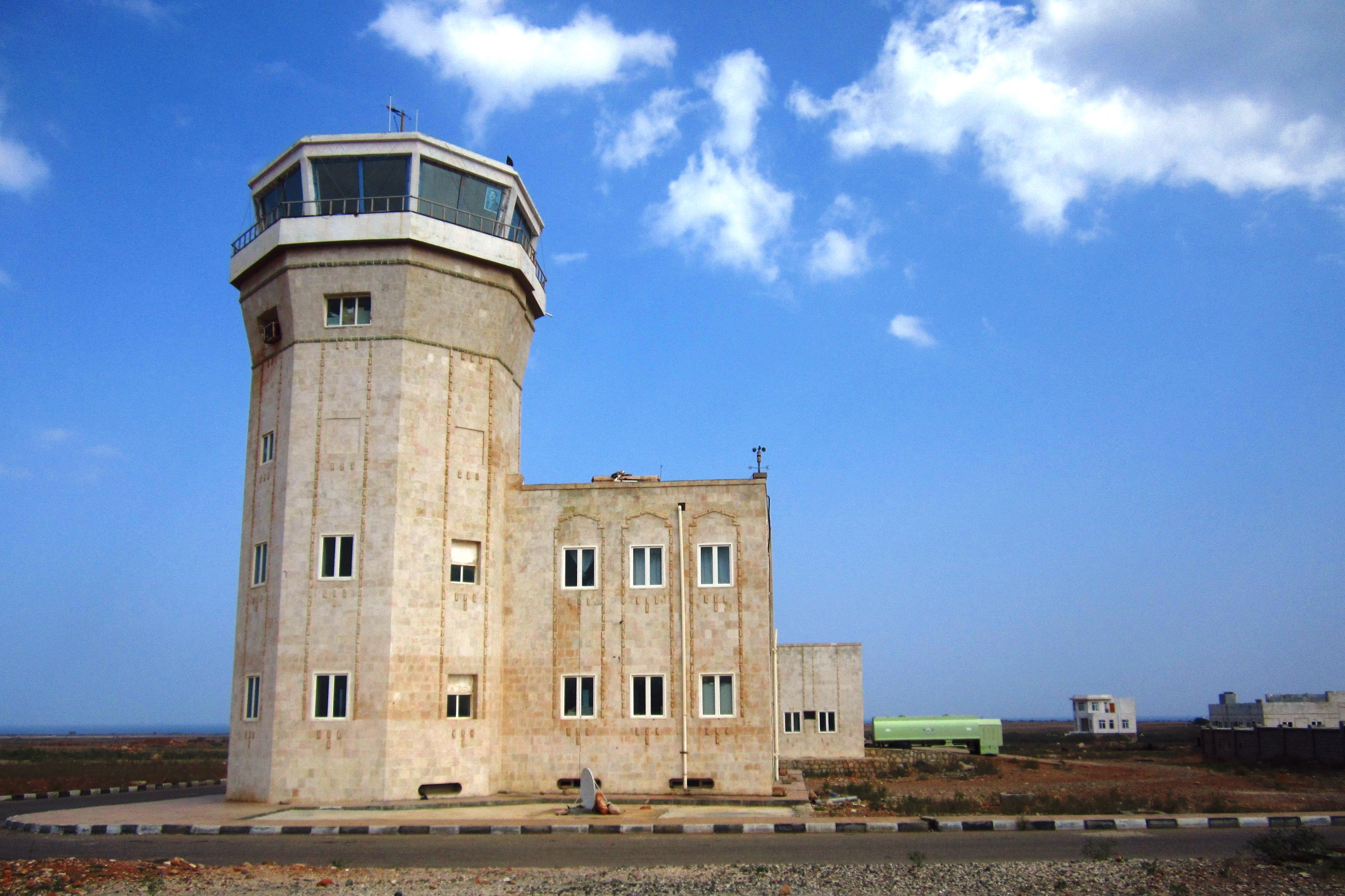
- IATA: SCT; ICAO: OYSQ

Summary
- Airport type: Public / Military
- Serves: Socotra
- Location: Hidaybu district, Socotra Governorate, Yemen
- Opened: 1999
- Elevation AMSL: 45 m (148 ft)
- Coordinates: 12°37′50″N 053°54′20″E

Map
- Location of airport in Yemen

Runways
Direction	Length		Surface
Direction	m	ft	Surface
03/21	3,300	10,827	Asphalt

Socotra Airport (Arabic: مطار سقطرى) is an airport in Socotra, Yemen (IATA: SCT, ICAO: OYSQ). It is the only commercial airport that serves the Socotra Governorate of Yemen and its capital town of Hadibu.

== History ==
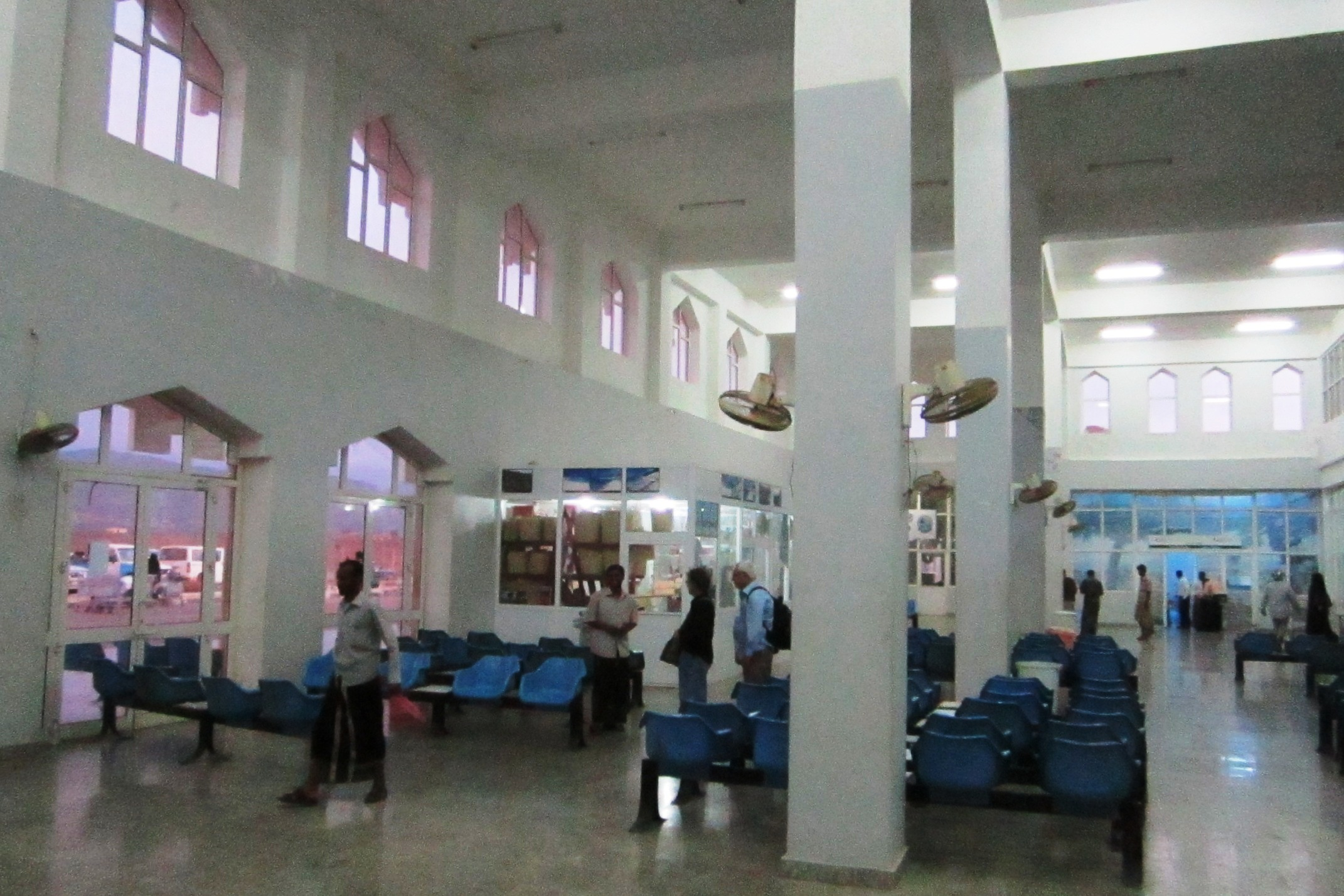
Airport lobby

Socotra Airport was first opened in July 1999. Prior to its construction, travel to Socotra was difficult and often required visitors to board cargo ships and go by sea, which itself was unreliable during monsoon season. The opening of the airport coincided with increasing development of the island.

Flights were suspended in March 2015, due to the Saudi Arabian-led intervention in Yemen.

In April 2018, the United Arab Emirates (UAE) deployed more than a hundred troops with artillery and armoured vehicles to the Yemeni archipelago of Socotra in the Guardafui Channel without prior coordination with the Yemeni government, causing the relations of the two countries to deteriorate. During the occupation of Socotra, Emirati troops dismissed the Yemeni officials and took administrative control of the airport. The following month, an agreement was reached between the United Arab Emirates and Yemen where control of the airport returned to the Yemeni authorities.

On 21 June 2020, following a coup, the United Arab Emirates-backed Southern Transitional Council took control of Socotra from the internationally-recognized government of Yemen, However it was retaken in the 2025–2026 Southern Yemen campaign.

The UAE runs a once a week charter flight to Socotra Airport from Zayed International Airport. The flights were not authorized by the internationally-recognized government of Yemen, and have been described as illegitimate by the Houthi government and an unnamed source in the Yemeni Information, Tourism and Culture Ministry.

== Airlines and destinations ==
Airlines	Destinations	Refs.
Yemenia	Aden, Al Ghaydah, Mukalla, Jeddah	

== See also ==
- List of airports in Yemen
