= ASMA =

ASMA can stand for:

- Antarctic Specially Managed Area
- Anti-smooth muscle antibody
- Actin, alpha 1
- Atari SAP Music Archive
- Aerospace Medical Association

== See also ==
- Asma (disambiguation)
