= Southern Transitional Council takeover of Socotra =

2020 takeover in Yemen

- Part of Yemeni civil war and Southern Transitional Council conflict
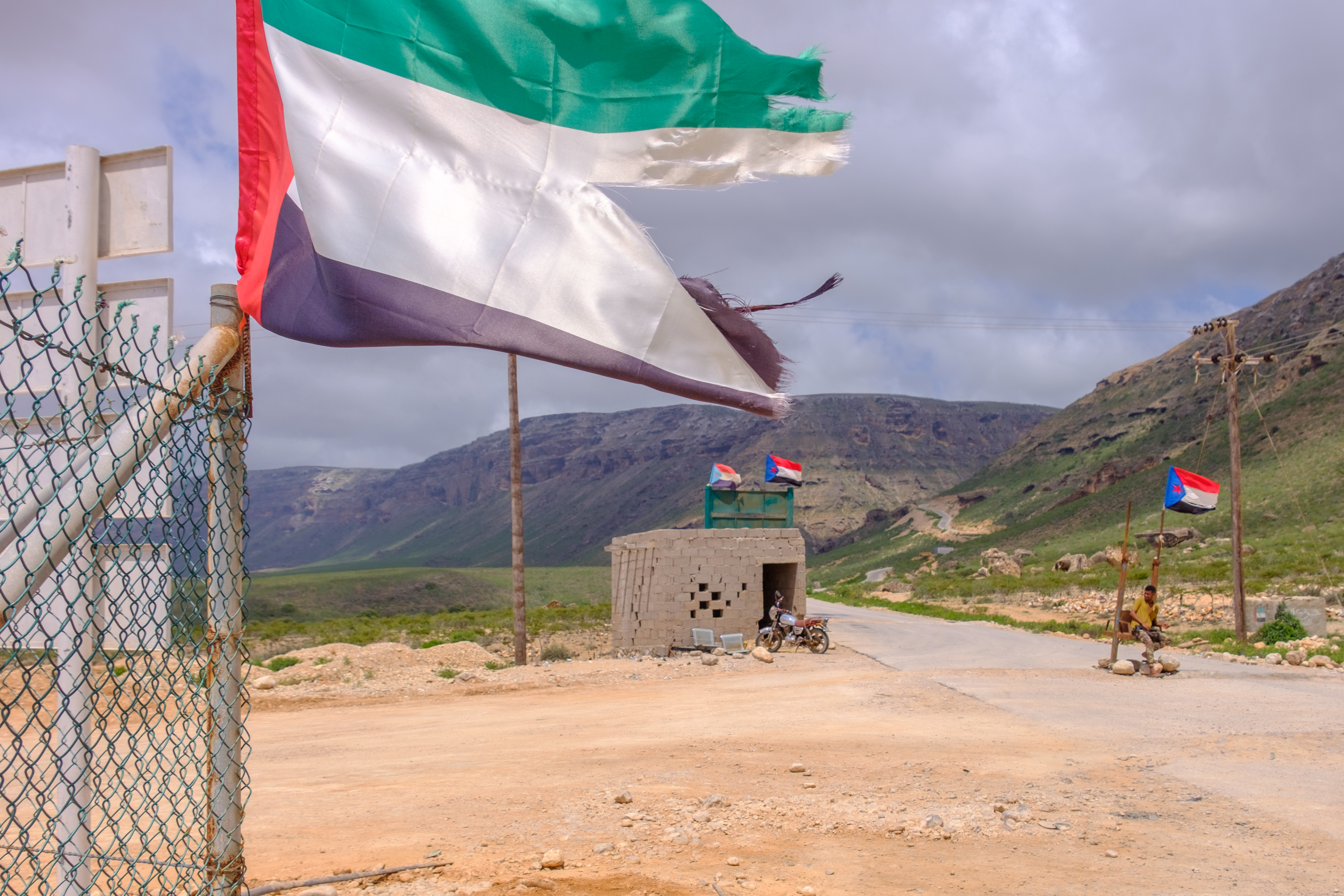
- UAE and STC-operated roadblock in Socotra
Date	21 June 2020
Location	Socotra Governorate, Yemen
Result	STC-UAE victory

Belligerents
Southern Transitional Council; United Arab Emirates	Yemen

Commanders and leaders
(United Arab Emirates) Khalfan al-Mazrouei (South Yemen) Raft al-Taqlee	(Yemen) Abdrabbuh Mansur Hadi (Yemen) Ramzi Mahroos

On 21 June 2020, the United Arab Emirates-backed Southern Transitional Council (STC) took over the Socotra Archipelago Governorate.

== Background ==
After the Arab Spring reached the capital of the island, Hadibu, locals began to rise against the then-President of Yemen, Ali Abdullah Saleh. During this period of instability, the United Arab Emirates (UAE) has sought to expand its presence in the region, framing its actions as humanitarian aid missions. This engagement has contributed to the increasing politicization and militarization of Socotra.

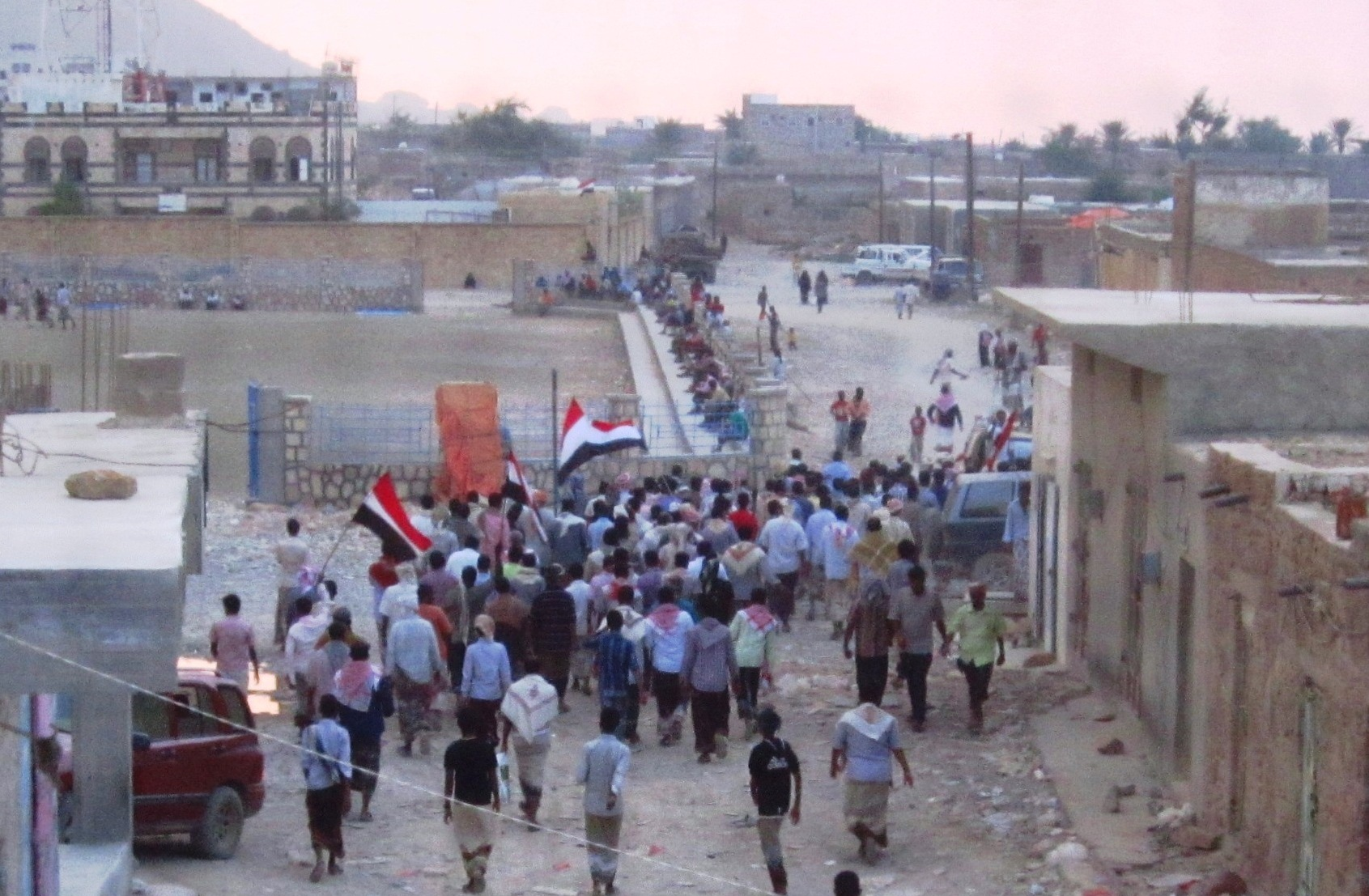
Protestors in Hadibu during the Arab Spring

Protests in Socotra followed the pattern of protests in mainland Yemen, calling for "political reform" and "the end of the regime and its corruption". With the rise of internet access, locals divided into two camps: those calling for a Socotran governorate independent of the Hadhramaut Governorate of eastern mainland Yemen, and those demanding an autonomous federal region. In 2013, the Socotra Archipelago became the Socotra Governorate.

A series of cyclones, Chapala and Megh in 2015 and Mekunu in 2018, struck the archipelago causing severe damage to the main island's infrastructure, homes, roads, and power. Due to the collective impacts of the cyclones, the UAE sent an aid ship and plane, carrying blankets, tents, and barrels of food. The Emiratis also rebuilt the infrastructure and established the "Sheikh Zayed City" and rebuilt the port of Hadiboh and the airport. The UAE's habit of operating and expanding infrastructures was not a new practice for the UAE, as they have done the same thing with the port cities of Mokha, Aden and Mukalla; in doing so, they established ties with Southern Movement-related groups and militias, most notably the Southern Transitional Council (STC).

In 2016, the UAE increased supplies delivered to Socotra, which had been neglected due to pressing mainland concerns during the ongoing conflict. In October 2016, the 31st cargo aircraft landed in Socotra Airport carrying two tons of aid. At that time, the UAE also illegally established a military base on the island as a part of the Saudi Arabian–led intervention.

In 2017, Emirati troops were deployed to the island as part of the Saudi Arabian-led intervention. The UAE also provided more than $2 billion in aid to Yemen, with a significant portion of that funding directed toward Socotra. These actions sparked criticism and led to rumors suggesting the UAE attempted to occupy the island. The UAE denied those claims.

=== 2018 Emirati occupation ===
On 30 April 2018, the UAE deployed over a hundred troops with artillery and armored vehicles to the Yemeni archipelago of Socotra in the Guardafui Channel without prior coordination with the Yemeni government, causing the relations of the two countries to deteriorate. The initial deployment consisted of UAE military aircraft carrying over fifty UAE soldiers and two armored vehicles, followed by two more aircraft carrying additional soldiers, tanks, and other armored vehicles. Al Jazeera reported that shortly after landing, UAE forces dismissed Yemeni soldiers stationed at administrative installations such as Socotra Airport and seaports until further notice, and the flag of the United Arab Emirates was raised above official government buildings in Hadibu. On 14 May an agreement was reached between the UAE and Yemen which saw Yemen regain administrative control and Saudi Arabian troops also being deployed to the island.

Since 2019, the UAE-backed STC Security Belt Forces has significantly expanded its presence on the island. The fighters involved primarily originate from Aden and the southwestern regions of Yemen.

== Takeover ==
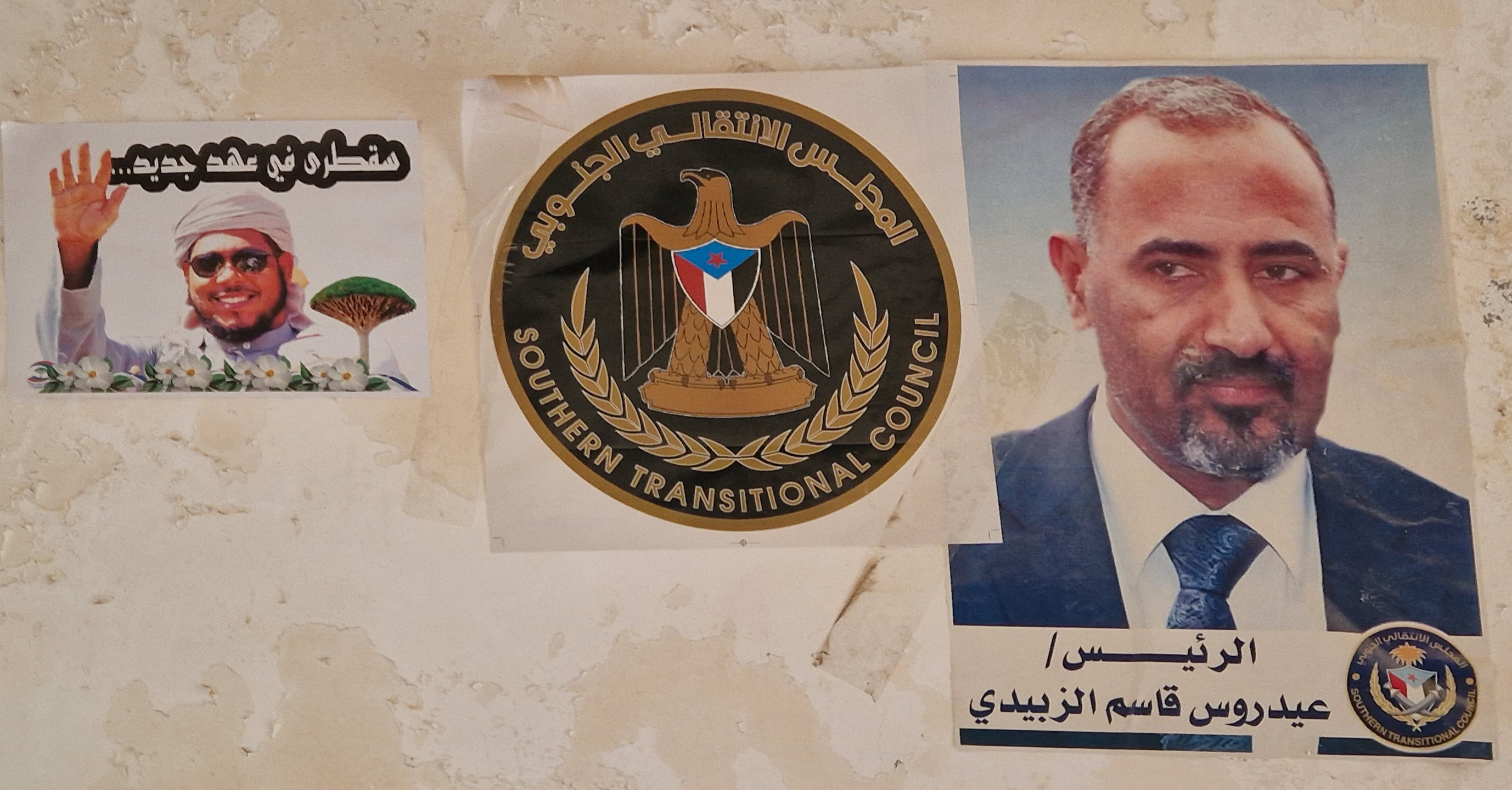
Southern Transitional Council propaganda posters in Qulensya, Socotra, with portraits of Aidarus al-Zubaidi (right) and Raft al-Taqlee (left) with a caption that reads "Socotra in a new era"

Between April and June of 2020, the UAE deployed hundreds of mercenaries to Socotra, taking control of key positions throughout the island, including the capital, Hadiboh.

On June 21, 2020, the Southern Transitional Council (STC) seized control of government facilities and military bases on Socotra Island following opposition from the island's governor, Ramzi Mahroos, to the establishment of a pro-Emirati local force. This action prompted a swift withdrawal of Saudi forces from the area. The takeover by the STC represented a significant shift in control, allowing the UAE to exercise indirect authority over Socotra. Reports indicate that the wages for Socotrans are allegedly paid by the UAE. Additionally, a unit from the local Yemeni Coast Guard defected and aligned itself with the STC during this transition.

The archipelago's governor later fled to Oman and continued to govern the archipelago using WhatsApp. According to Le Monde diplomatique, "Raft al-Taqlee [...] is not really in command, but rather Khalfan al-Mazrouei, an Emirati who heads a welfare organization in his own country," and is behind the 2018 occupation and this coup.

== Aftermath ==
The Hadi-led internationally recognized government of Yemen initially called the takeover "a full-fledged coup".

A 2021 report by Agence France-Presse highlights that the flags of the STC are significantly smaller than the larger flags of the UAE that are seen at police checkpoints. Additionally, the report indicates that the newly established communication links connect directly to UAE networks instead of Yemen's official network, YemenNet.

In 2023, the Presidential Leadership Council, which integrated the STC into the government, appointed al-Taqlee as the de jure governor of the Archipelago. Under his rule, peaceful protests against the coup and the UAE's interference in Socotra were dispersed with violence, and journalists who criticized the coup were arrested and beaten.

== See also ==
- 2022 Southern Yemen offensive
- 2025 Hadhramaut offensive
