= Hadibu =

Hadibu حديبو (Arabic)
- town
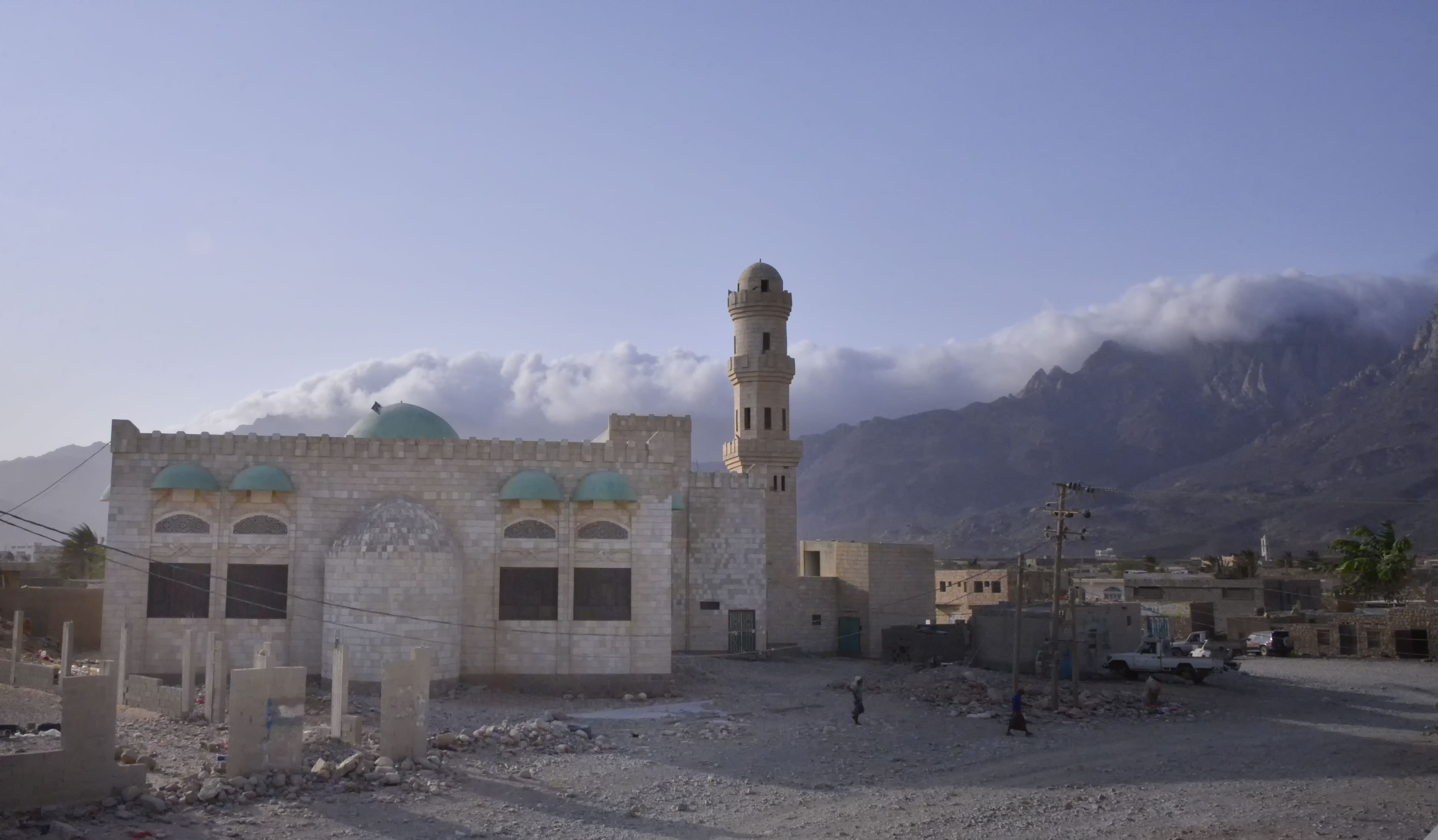
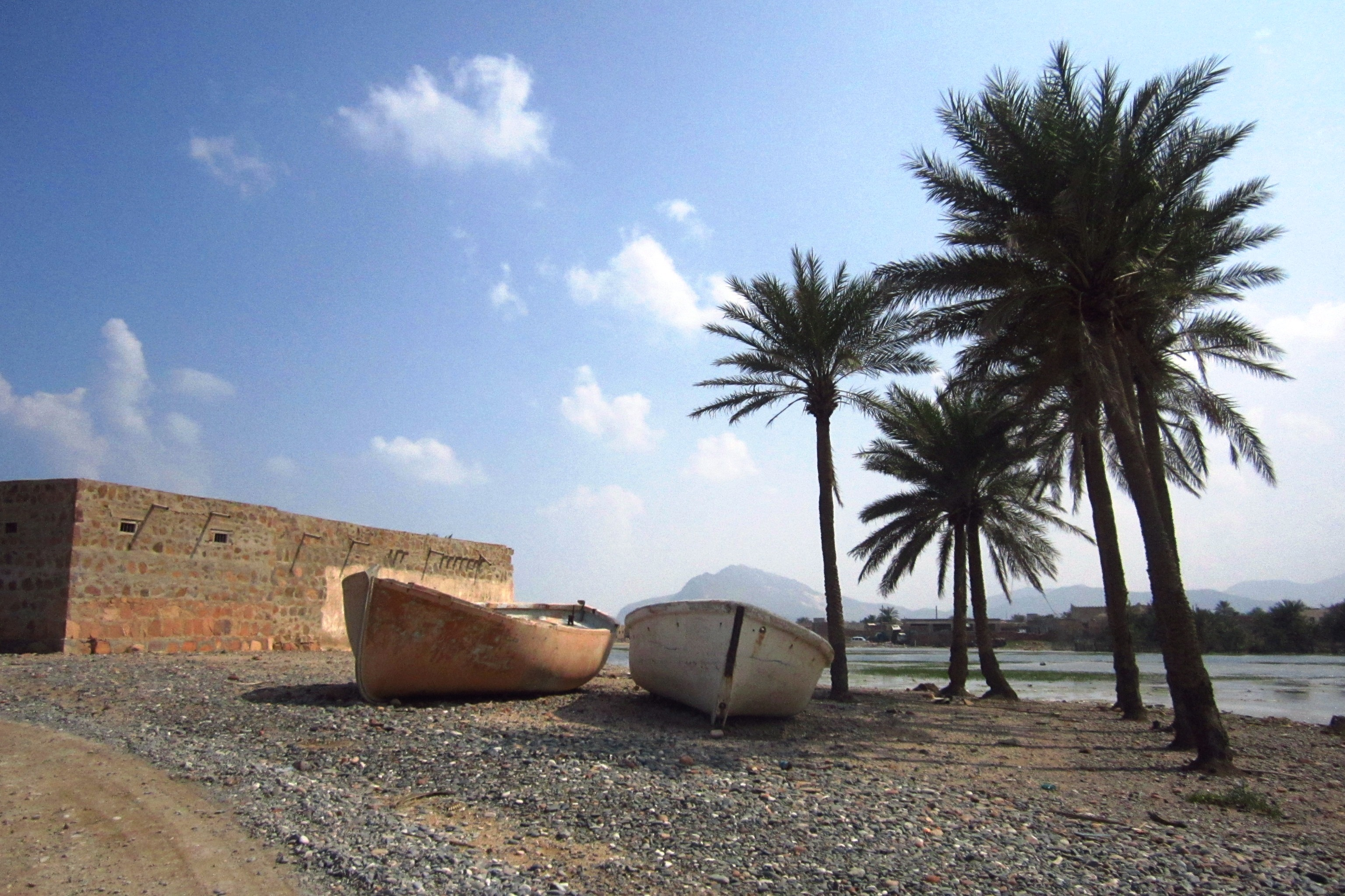
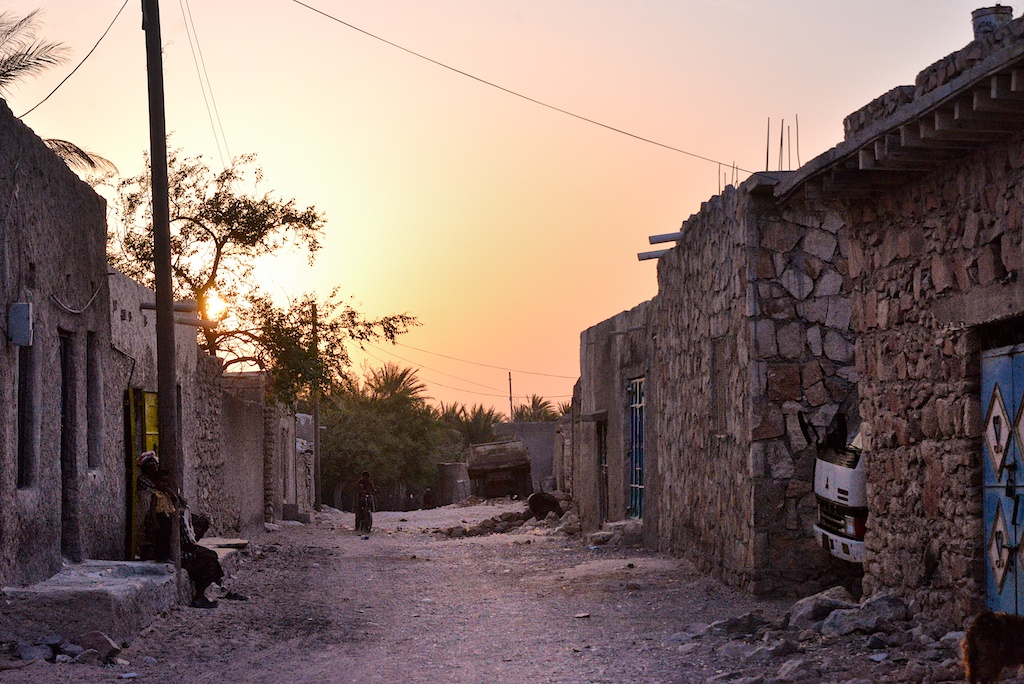
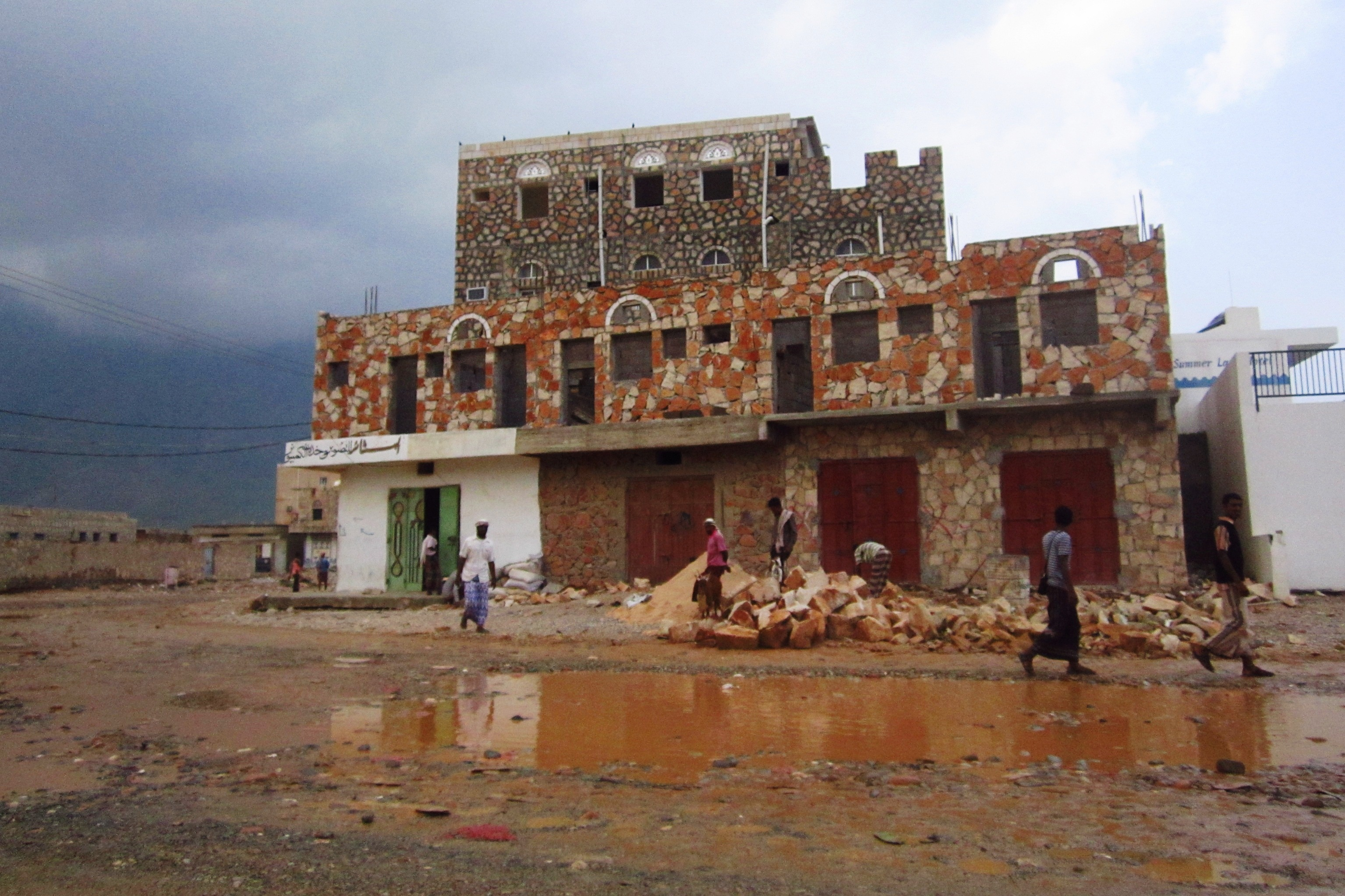
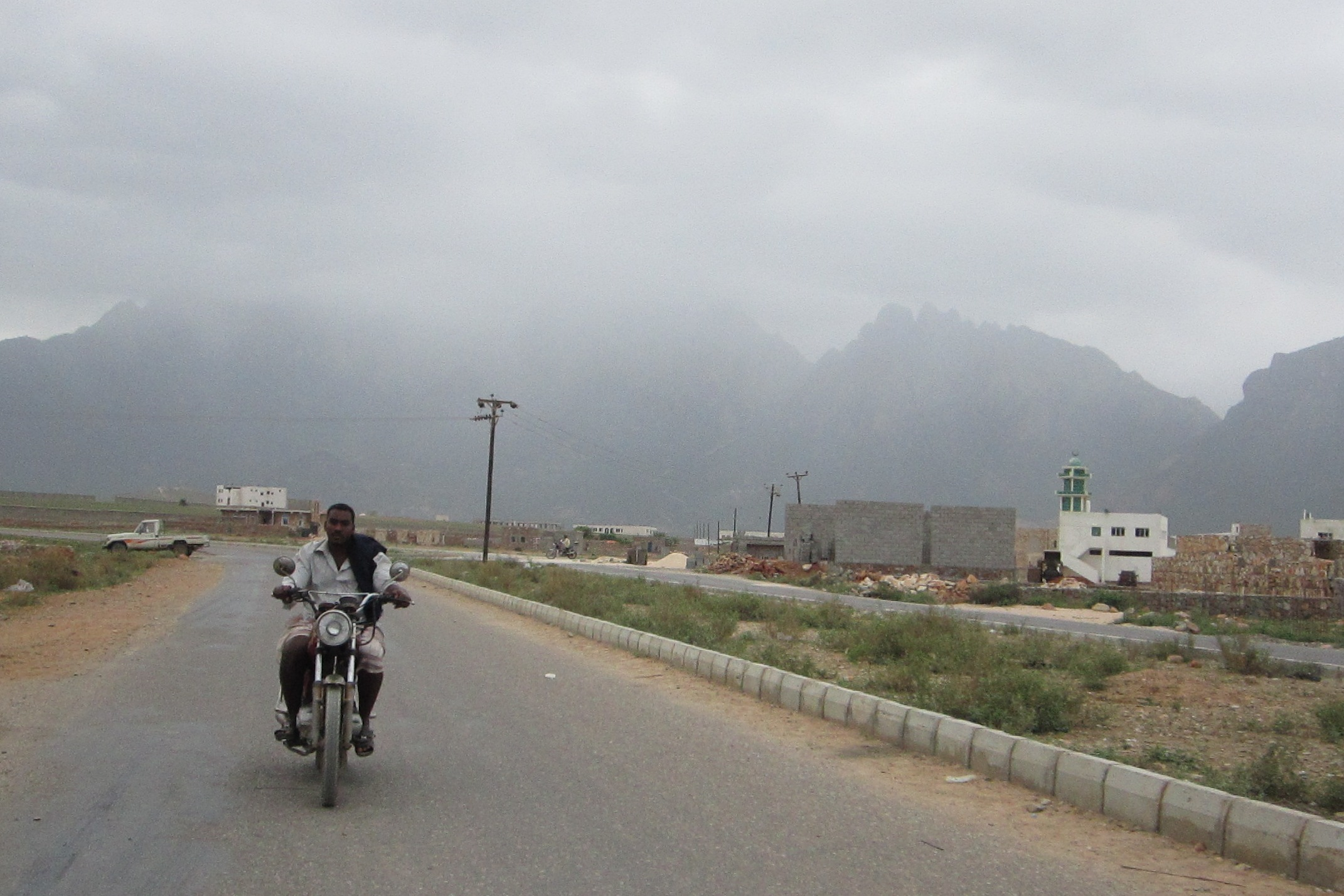
- Clockwise from top: Mosque in Hadibu, Hadibu sunset, A street in Hadibu, Hotel in Hadibu, fishing boats on coastline

- Location in Yemen
- Coordinates: 12°39′N 54°01′E
- Country: Yemen
- Governorate: Socotra
- District: Hadibu

Population (2004)
  - Total: 8,545
- Time zone: UTC+03:00 (Arabia Standard Time)
  - Summer (DST): (Not Observed)

Hadibu (Note: Arabic: حديبو Ḥadībū) (Note: formerly known as Tamrida (Arabic: تمريدة)) is the largest town and administrative capital of Socotra Governorate, a governorate of Yemen. It is situated on the northeastern coast of Socotra in the Socotra Archipelago. It hosts the main airport and sea port serving the island, making it the primary gateway. It is the seat of Hidaybū, the larger eastern district of Socotra's two administrative districts. The Soqotri language, an unwritten Semitic language, is widely spoken.

== History ==
In 2008, stone tools used by early Homo erectus have been discovered near Hadibu, and suggests possible habitation dating back to more than a million years. While navigation and trade with the islands existed for centuries, the Indians landed in the islands in the 4th century BCE, before it was captured by the Greeks. In the 1st century CE, its inhabitants included Arabs, Indians and Greeks, and was ruled by the king of Hadramaut. In 52 CE, St. Thomas came to the island and converted the islanders to Christianity.

In the later years, the island lost its commercial importance. In the 15th Century, it came under the rule of Shihr. In 1507 CE, the Portuguese fleet commanded by Tristao da Cunha and Afonso de Albuquerque killed the local Mahri ruler, and established a garrison. In 1511, Portuguese withdraw from Soqotra, and the British East India Company arrived in Hadibo in April 1608. The British used the island for the next few centuries, using it as a base to seize Aden in 1839. In 1876, a treaty was signed between Britain and the local Sultan. During the Second World War, the allies used it as a base. In 1967, it became part of the independent South Yemen, before it became part of Yemen Republic in the 1990s.

== Geography and demographics ==
Hadibu is situated on the northeastern coast of Socotra in the Socotra Archipelago. It is the capital and seat of the Socotra Governorate. It was earlier known as Tamrida. The town is densely populated, with estimates putting the population at 90,000 inhabitants in 2020. However, due to large migration from mainland Yemen due to the Yemeni civil war, the population is estimated to have gone up to 150,000 since the early 2020s. The Soqotri language, an unwritten Semitic language, is widely spoken in the island.

== Infrastructure ==
Some early infrastructure projects such as roads, elementary schools, and clinics were built in the 1970s. While modern houses have been built in the 2020s, the city still has a lot of unfinished houses and bare structures housing its overcrowded population. The town is the location of the island's airport and major seaport, making it a key getaway. Early air communication was established with Aden in the 1970s. Socotra Airport is located about 12 km (7.5 mi) west of Hadibu.

== See also ==
- List of cities in Socotra archipelago
