= Hidaybu district =

Coordinates: 12°30′N 54°10′E

Hidaybu District مديرية حديبو
- District
- Hidaybu is the eastern district of Socotra
- Country: Yemen
- Governorate: Socotra
- Seat: Hadibu

Population (2003)
  - Total: 34,011
- Time zone: UTC+3 (Yemen Standard Time)

Hidaybu District (Arabic: مديرية حديبو) is one of two districts of the Socotra Governorate, Yemen. It occupies the eastern part of the main island of Socotra archipelago. It is named after its capital and the principal town of the archipelago, the town of Hidaybu (Hadibu). As of 2003, the district had a population of 34,011 people.
