= Socotra =

Largest of four islands of the Socotra Archipelago, Yemen

Native name: Arabic: سُقُطْرَىٰ, romanized: Suquṭrā Soqotri: ساقطْري, romanized: Sāqaṭri
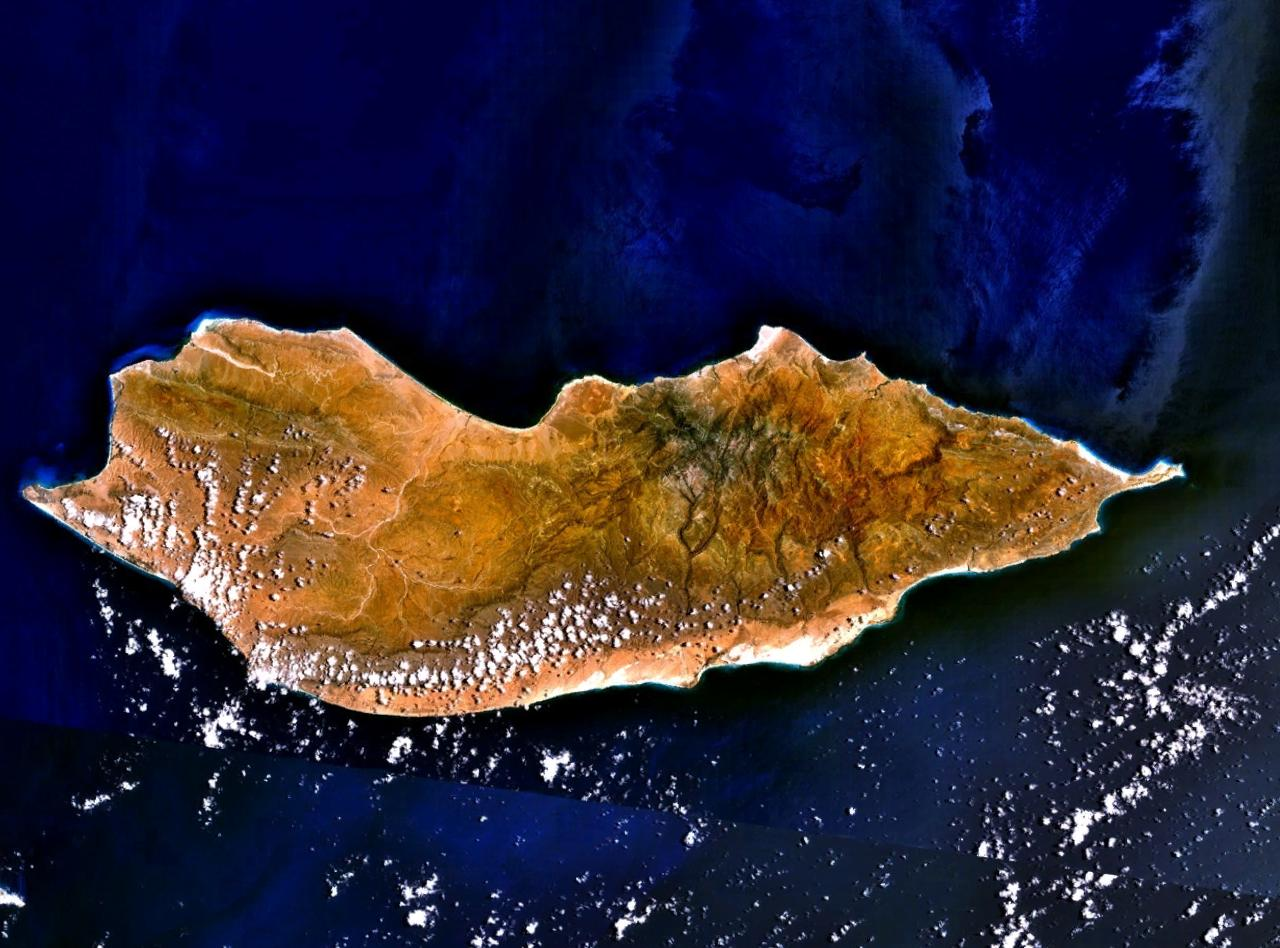
- Landsat view of Socotra

- Location within Yemen

Geography
- Location: Between the Guardafui Channel and the Arabian Sea
- Coordinates: 12°30′36″N 53°55′12″E
- Archipelago: Socotra
- Area: 3,796 km^{2} (1,466 sq mi)
- Length: 132 km (82 mi)
- Width: 50 km (31 mi)
- Highest elevation: 1,503 m (4931 ft)
- Highest point: Mashanig, Hajhir Mountains

Administration
- Yemen
- Governorate: Socotra
- Capital and largest city: Hadibu (pop. 8,545)

Demographics
- Population: 60,000
- Pop. density: 11.3/km^{2} (29.3/sq mi)
- Ethnic groups: Yemenis: predominantly Soqotrans; minority Hadharem, and Mahris

Socotra /səˈkoʊtrə/ (Note: Also /soʊ-, ˈsɒkətrə/; Arabic: سُقُطْرَىٰ Suquṭrā) locally known as Saqatri, (Note: Soqotri: ساقطْري, romanized: Sāqaṭri) is a Yemeni island in the Indian Ocean. It is situated between the Gulf of Aden, the Guardafui Channel and the Arabian Sea, and lies near major shipping routes. The largest of the six islands in the Socotra archipelago, it comprises around 95% of the landmass of the archipelago. It lies 380 kilometres (205 nautical miles) south of the Arabian Peninsula and 232 km (125 nmi) east of the Horn of Africa. The island is culturally and administratively a part of Yemen, but geographically it belongs to Africa, for it represents a continental fragment that is geologically linked to the Somali plate. The inhabitants of the island are called Soqotrans, and they speak Arabic and Soqotri.

Socotra is unusual in hosting a large number of species that are endemic; a third of its plant life is found nowhere else on Earth. Due to the island's unusual geography, it has been described as "the most alien-looking place on Earth". The island measures 132 km (82 mi) in length and 42 km (26 mi) across at its widest. In 2008, Socotra was recognised as a UNESCO World Heritage Site.

== Etymology ==
Scholars' views vary regarding the origin of the island's name. One theory is that the term Socotra /səˈkoʊtrə/ may derive from a Greek name that is derived from the name of a South Arabian tribe mentioned in Sabaic and Ḥaḍramitic inscriptions as Dhū-Śakūrid (s³krd). Another theory is that the Arabic term Suqutra breaks down as follows: suq means 'market', and qutra is a vulgar form of qatir, which refers to dragon's blood. The capital city of Socotra was Suq as reported by the Portuguese in the 16th century, which they referred to as market place.

== History ==
=== Prehistory ===
There was initially an Oldowan lithic culture in Socotra. Oldowan stone tools were found in the area around Hadibo in 2008.

=== Antiquity ===
Socotra played an important role in ancient international trade and appears as Dioskouridou (Διοσκουρίδου νῆσος), meaning "the island of Dioscurides" in the Periplus of the Erythraean Sea, a first-century AD Greek navigation aid.

The Hoq Cave contains a large number of inscriptions, drawings and archaeological objects. Further investigation showed that these had been left by sailors who visited the island between the first century BC and the sixth century AD. The texts are written in the South Arabian, Ethiopic, Indian Brāhmī, Greek, Palmyrene and Bactrian languages. This corpus of nearly 250 texts and drawings constitutes one of the main sources for the investigation of Indian Ocean trade networks in that time period.

=== Medieval ===
In 880, an Aksumite expeditionary force conquered the island, and an Oriental Orthodox bishop was consecrated. The Ethiopians were later dislodged by a large armada sent by Imam Al-Salt bin Malik of Oman. According to the Persian geographer Ibn al-Mujawir, who testifies having arrived in Socotra from India in 1222, there were two groups of people on the island, the indigenous mountain dwellers and the foreign coastal dwellers. There were large settlements of Indian traders from Sindh and Balochistan.

Ibn Hawqal, a 10th-century history chronicler, mentions Socotra in his book The Renaissance of Islam. He mentioned it as a prominent source of piracy, stating: "the island Socotra in particular was regarded as a dangerous nest of pirates, at which people trembled as they passed it. It was the point d'appui of the Indian pirates who ambushed the Believers there."

=== Early modern ===
In 1507, a Portuguese fleet commanded by Tristão da Cunha with Afonso de Albuquerque landed at Suq and captured the port after a stiff battle against the Mahra Sultanate. Their objective was to set a base in a strategic place on the route to India. The lack of a proper harbor and the infertility of the land led to famine and sickness in the garrison, and the Portuguese abandoned the island in 1511. The Mahra sultans took back control of the island, and the inhabitants were converted to Islam.

=== Modern ===
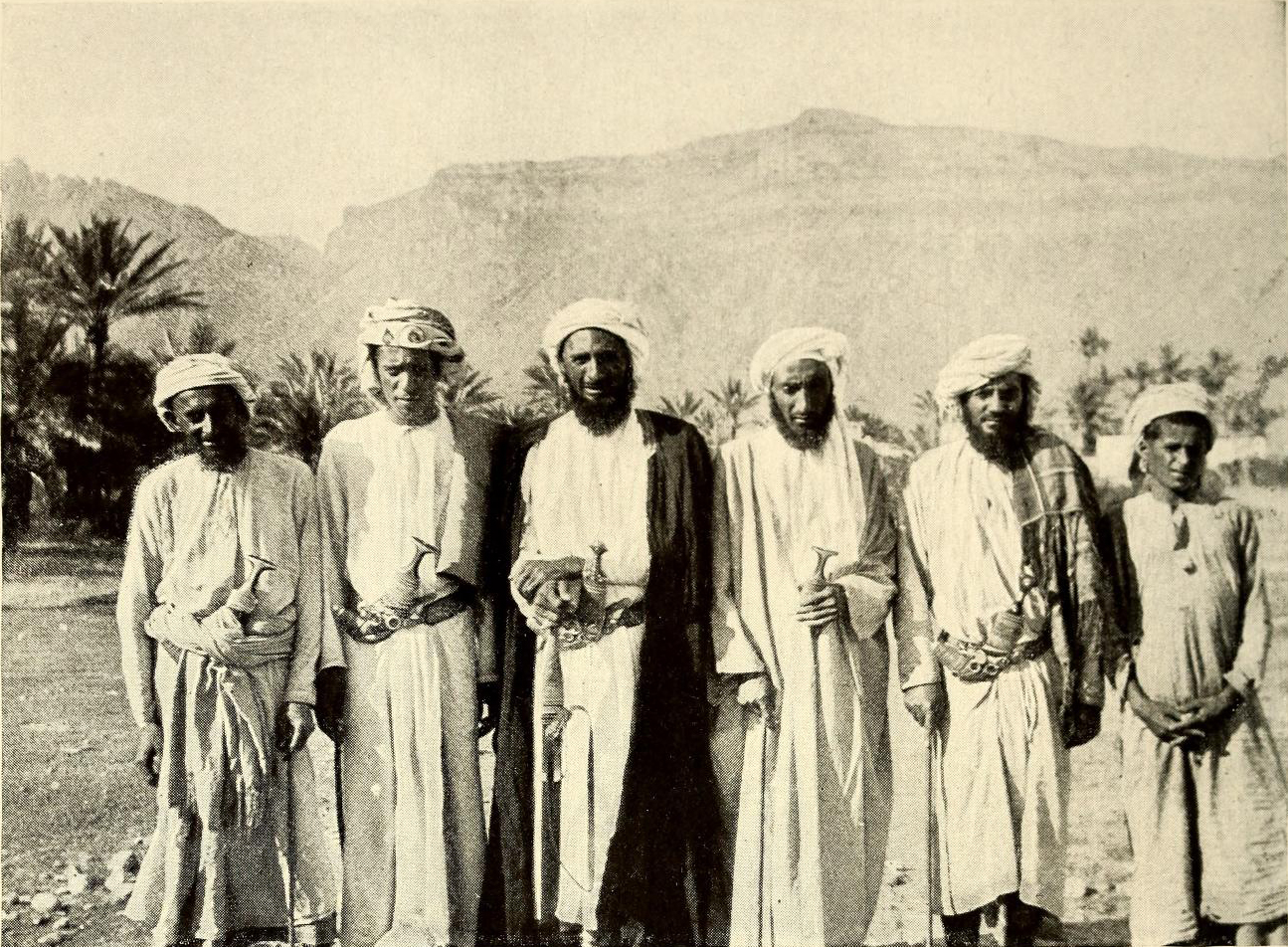
Local men from Socotra taken by Charles K. Moser (1918)

In 1834, the East India Company stationed a garrison on Socotra, in the expectation that the Mahra sultan of Qishn and Socotra would accept an offer to sell the island. The lack of good anchorages proved to be as much a problem for the British as the Portuguese. The sultan refused to sell, and the British left in 1835. After the capture of Aden by the British in 1839, they lost interest in acquiring Socotra. In 1886, the British government decided to conclude a protectorate treaty with the sultan in which he promised this time to "refrain from entering into any correspondence, agreement, or treaty with any foreign nation or power, except with the knowledge and sanction of the British Government". In October 1967, in the wake of the departure of the British from Aden and southern Arabia, the Mahra Sultanate was abolished.

On 30 November 1967, Socotra became part of South Yemen. Between 1976 and 1979, the island served as a base for the Soviet Navy, although the South Yemeni government and president, Ali Nasir Muhammad, denied their existence. Slavery in the island was abolished under the rule of the Yemeni Socialist Party.

Since Yemeni unification in 1990, Socotra has been a part of the Republic of Yemen, affiliated first to Aden Governorate. In 2004, it was moved to be a part of the Hadhramaut Governorate. Later, in 2013, it became a governorate of its own.

Socotra was impacted by the 2004 Indian Ocean earthquake and tsunami, which damaged 40 fishing boats, even though the island was 4,600 km (2,858 mi) away from the tsunami epicentre off the west coast of Aceh, Indonesia. In 2015, the cyclones Chapala and Megh struck the island, causing severe damage to its infrastructure.

Beginning in 2015, the UAE began increasing its presence on Socotra, first with humanitarian aid in the wake of tropical cyclones Chapala and Megh, and it eventually establishing a military presence on the island. On 30 April 2018, the UAE, as part of the ongoing Saudi Arabian–led intervention in Yemen, landed troops on the island and took control of Socotra Airport and seaport. On 14 May 2018, Saudi troops were also deployed on the island, and a deal was brokered between the UAE and Yemen for a joint military training exercise and the return of administrative control of the airport and seaport to Yemen. In June 2020, the UAE-backed Southern Transitional Council (STC) seized control of the island in a coup, ousting the local authorities and establishing its own government. However, in 2023, the Presidential Leadership Council, Yemen's internationally recognized government, integrated the STC into the government and recognized the STC's rule of the archipelago. Under its rule, peaceful protests against the coup and the UAE's interference in Socotra were violently dispersed, and journalists that criticized the coup were arrested and beaten.

== Geography ==
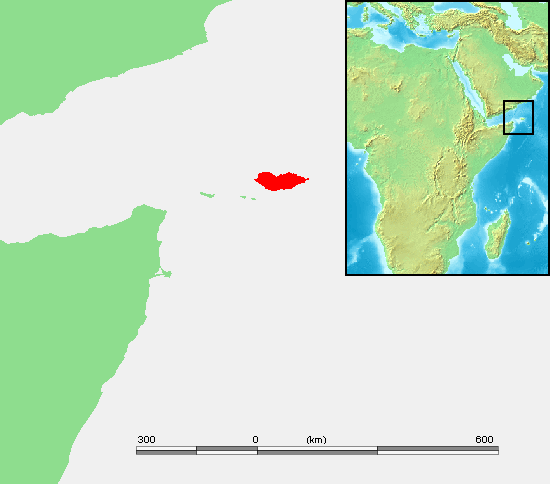
Locator map of Socotra

Socotra is one of the most isolated landforms on Earth of continental origin (i.e., not of volcanic origin). The archipelago was once part of the supercontinent of Gondwana. It detached during the Miocene epoch, in the same set of rifting events that opened the Gulf of Aden to its northwest. The island is culturally and administratively a part of Yemen, but geographically it belongs to Africa, for it represents a continental fragment that is geologically linked to the Somali plate. Socotra is known for its exceptional level of endemism, with about 37% of its plant species, 90% of its reptile species, and 95% of its land snail species found nowhere else on Earth.

The archipelago consists of the main island of Socotra (3,665 km^{2} or 1,415 sq mi), three smaller islands, Abd al Kuri, Samhah and Darsa, and two rocky islets, Ka'l Fir'awn and Sābūnīyah, both uninhabitable by humans but important for seabirds. The island is about 125 kilometres (78 mi) long and 45 kilometres (28 mi) north to south. The distance from Socotra to Cape Guardafui, its nearest point in the African mainland, is 232 km (125 nmi), and about 351 km (190 nmi) from Ras Fartaq in mainland Arabia. It has three major physical regions:

- The narrow coastal plains with its characteristic dunes, formed by monsoon winds blowing during three summer months. The wind takes up the coast sand in a spiral and, as a result, forms the snow-white Socotran sand dunes.
- The limestone plateaus of Momi, Homhil and Diksam with its characteristic karst topography based on limestone rock areas intersected with inter-hill plains. For centuries, and until recently, Socotra's main economic activity was subsistence transhumant animal husbandry, predominantly goats and sheep on these plateaus. The outcome is a unique and still active cultural landscape of agro-pastoralism with its characteristic rainwater harvesting systems.
- A central massif, the Hajhir Mountains, composed of granite and metamorphic rocks. rising to 1,503 metres (4,931 ft).
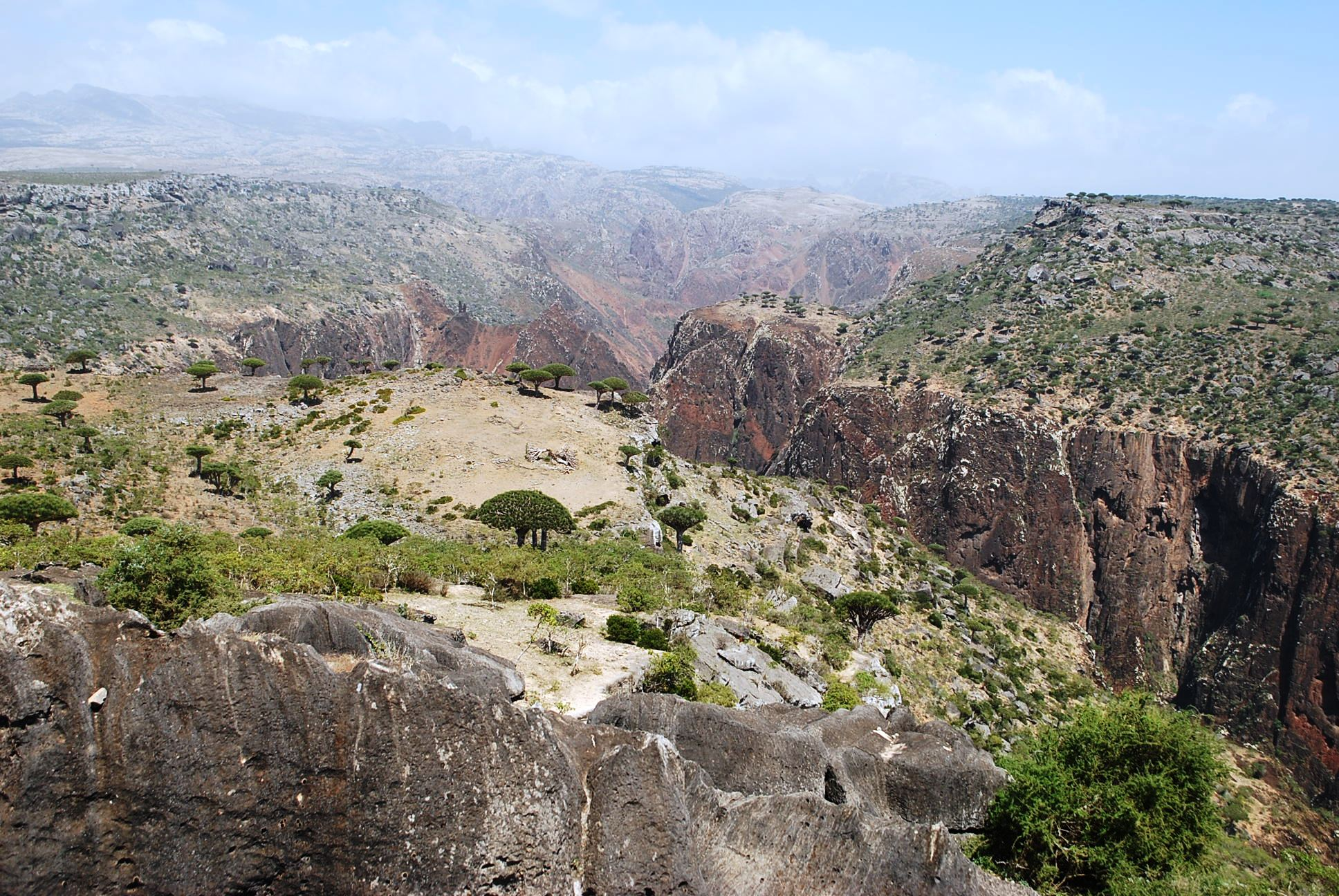
Diksam Plateau

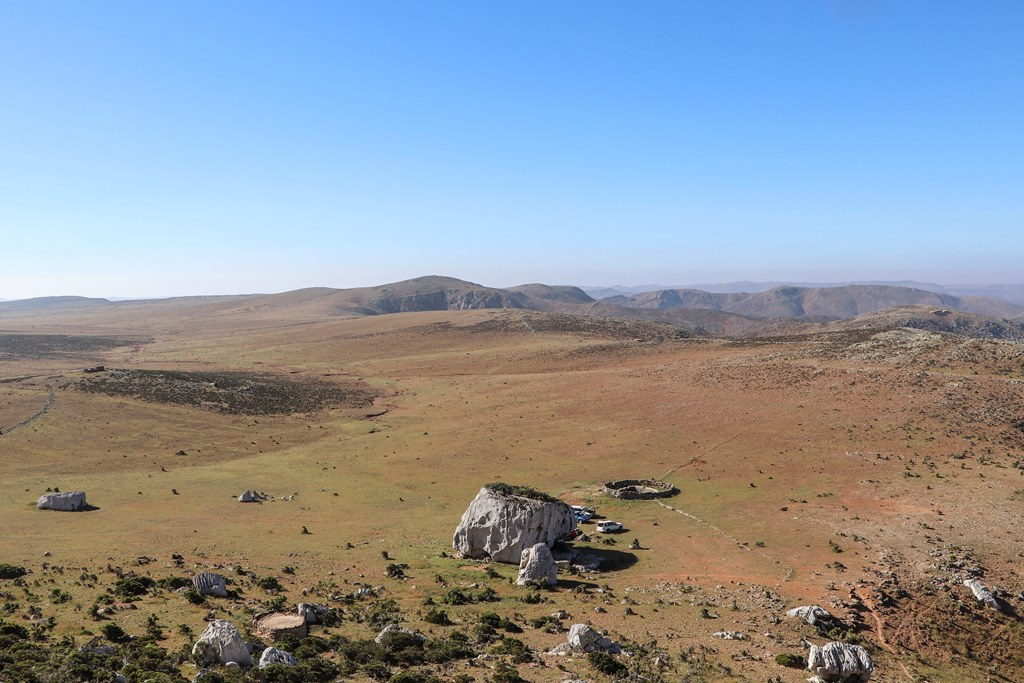
Momi Plateau with rainwater harvest structures, water storage body, shelter for herders

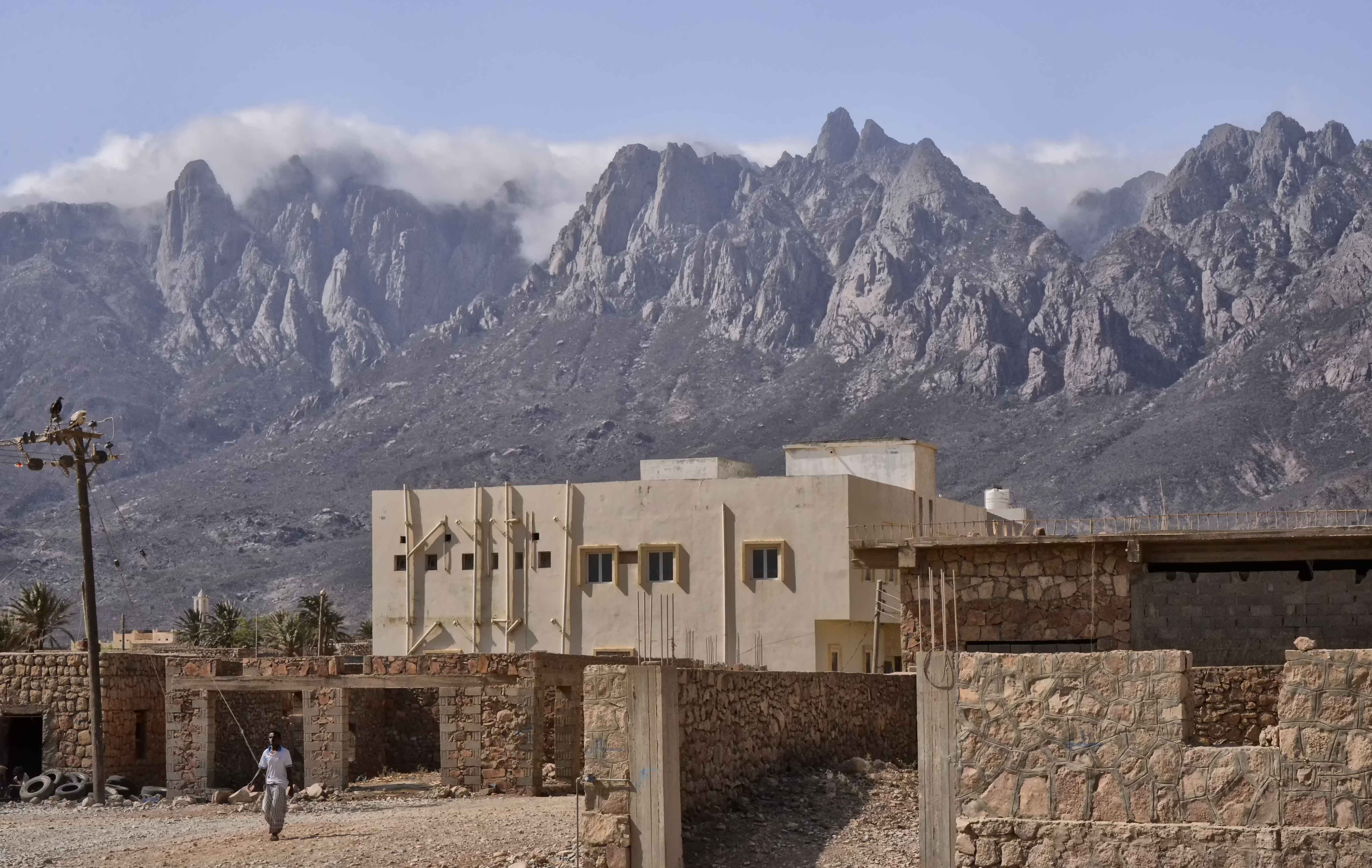
Hajhir Mountains

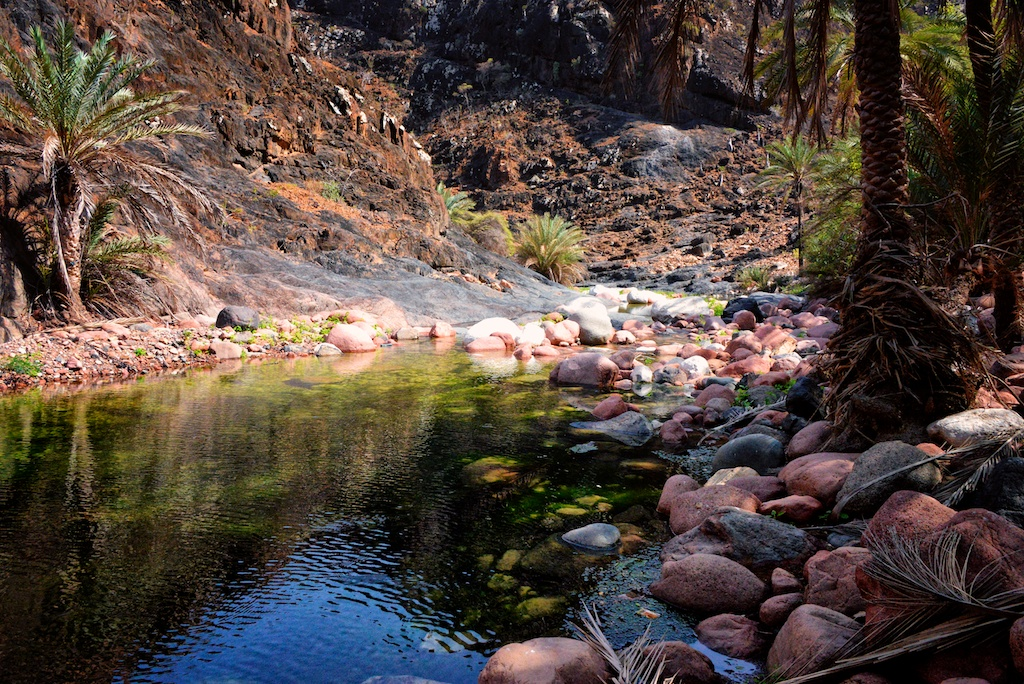
A wadi in Socotra

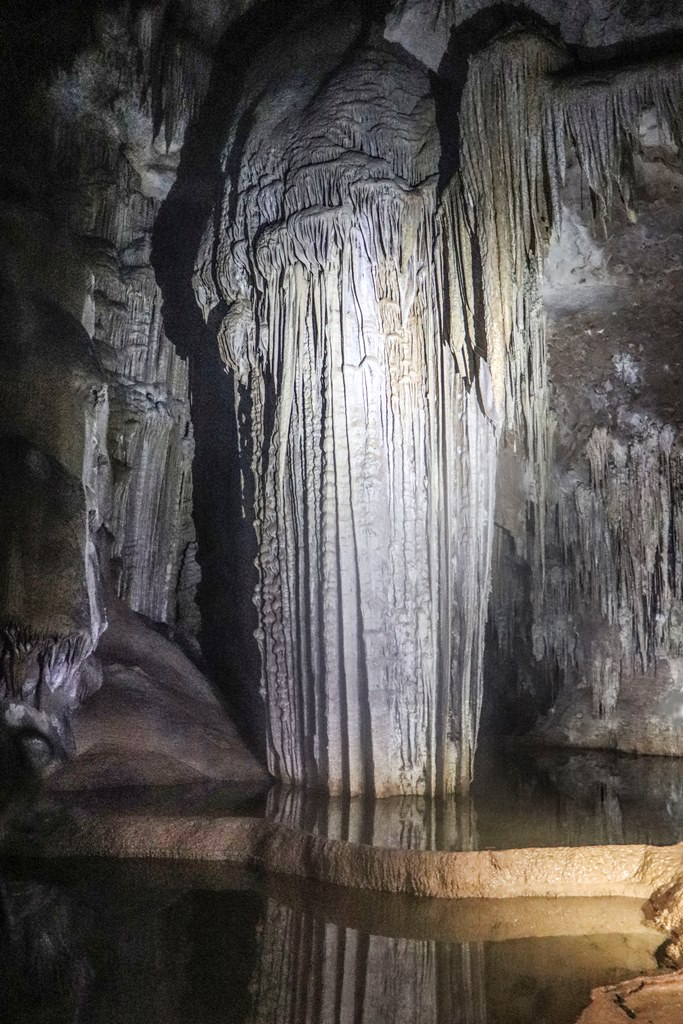
Hawk Cave (Arabic: كهف هوق) in the east of the island

== Climate ==
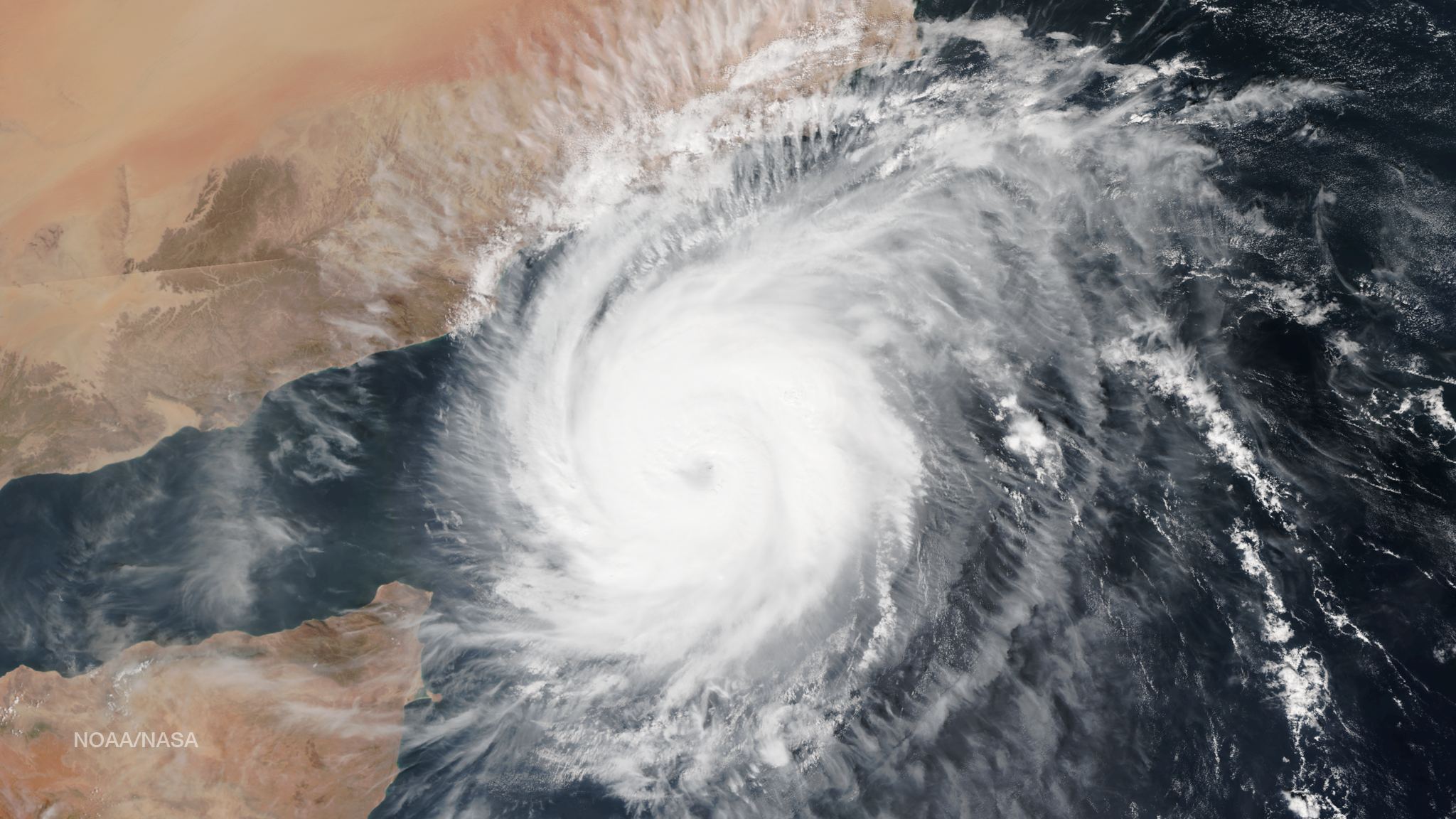
Tropical Cyclone Chapala over Socotra in 2015

The climate of Socotra is classified in the Köppen climate classification as BWh and BSh, meaning a transitional hot desert climate and a semi-desert climate with a mean annual temperature over 25 °C (77 °F). Yearly rainfall is light but is roughly spread throughout the year. Orographic lift provided by the interior mountains, especially during the northeast monsoon from October to December, results in the highest inland areas averaging as much as 800 millimetres (31.50 in) per year and receiving over 250 millimetres (9.84 in) per month during November and December. The southwest monsoon season from June to September brings strong winds and high seas.

In an extremely unusual occurrence, the normally arid western side of Socotra received more than 410 millimetres (16.14 in) of rain from Cyclone Chapala in November 2015. Cyclones rarely affect the island, but in 2015 Cyclone Megh became the strongest, and only, major cyclone to strike the island directly.

Climate data for Socotra Airport (SCT)
Month	Jan	Feb	Mar	Apr	May	Jun	Jul	Aug	Sep	Oct	Nov	Dec	Year
Record high °C (°F)	30.0 (86.0)	31.7 (89.1)	32.8 (91.0)	37.2 (99.0)	38.5 (101.3)	40.6 (105.1)	37.4 (99.3)	34.4 (93.9)	35.6 (96.1)	37.0 (98.6)	33.0 (91.4)	30.6 (87.1)	40.6 (105.1)
Mean daily maximum °C (°F)	27.1 (80.8)	27.8 (82.0)	29.2 (84.6)	31.8 (89.2)	34.6 (94.3)	33.8 (92.8)	32.3 (90.1)	32.4 (90.3)	33.2 (91.8)	30.8 (87.4)	29.6 (85.3)	28.3 (82.9)	30.8 (87.4)
Daily mean °C (°F)	24.8 (76.6)	24.8 (76.6)	26.3 (79.3)	28.7 (83.7)	31.3 (88.3)	30.8 (87.4)	29.5 (85.1)	29.5 (85.1)	29.3 (84.7)	27.9 (82.2)	27.0 (80.6)	25.8 (78.4)	28.0 (82.4)
Mean daily minimum °C (°F)	22.6 (72.7)	21.7 (71.1)	23.3 (73.9)	25.5 (77.9)	28.0 (82.4)	27.9 (82.2)	26.8 (80.2)	26.5 (79.7)	26.4 (79.5)	24.9 (76.8)	24.4 (75.9)	23.3 (73.9)	25.1 (77.2)
Record low °C (°F)	17.0 (62.6)	17.2 (63.0)	18.9 (66.0)	20.3 (68.5)	21.2 (70.2)	22.8 (73.0)	21.7 (71.1)	22.0 (71.6)	22.2 (72.0)	19.4 (66.9)	18.9 (66.0)	17.0 (62.6)	17.0 (62.6)
Average rainfall mm (inches)	2.5 (0.10)	2.5 (0.10)	10.2 (0.40)	0.0 (0.0)	2.5 (0.10)	30.5 (1.20)	0.0 (0.0)	0.0 (0.0)	2.5 (0.10)	10.2 (0.40)	50.8 (2.00)	81.3 (3.20)	193.0 (7.60)
Average rainy days (≥ 0.1 mm)	2.4	0.8	0.4	1.0	0.4	0.8	0.2	0.0	0.6	2.2	7.7	5.2	21.7
Average relative humidity (%)	70	68	67	66	62	60	58	57	62	69	72	73	65
Source: Deutscher Wetterdienst

== Endemism ==
The Socotra archipelago has been dubbed the Galapagos of the Indian Ocean due to its ecological diversity and high rates of endemism. It has 835 vascular plant species, of which 37% are endemic. Six bird species, 95% of its terrestrial molluscs, and 90% of its reptiles are endemic to the archipelago. A 2016 genetic survey of all Socotran reptiles revealed unexpectedly high levels of cryptic diversity, indicating that the island's actual reptile diversity may be greater than currently recognized. Socotra is home to several native mammals, none of which are endemic.

=== Endemic species ===
Due to the dry conditions and small size of the island, its fauna tend to be small.

The island has several native bats and shrews, including the Etruscan shrew, which is the smallest mammal in the world by mass. Socotra is of particular interest to ornithologists. The island has been designated an endemic bird area.

Some of the island's most striking species are its endemic plants and trees. Socotra has many native drought resistant plants which have adapted to the island's arid environment by developing large, bulbous stems in which they store their water. One notable example is Dendrosicyos socotranus (cucumber tree) which is the only tree in the Cucurbitaceae family. This species, which can grow over six meters high, has specialized cells which expand to hold water during wet periods.

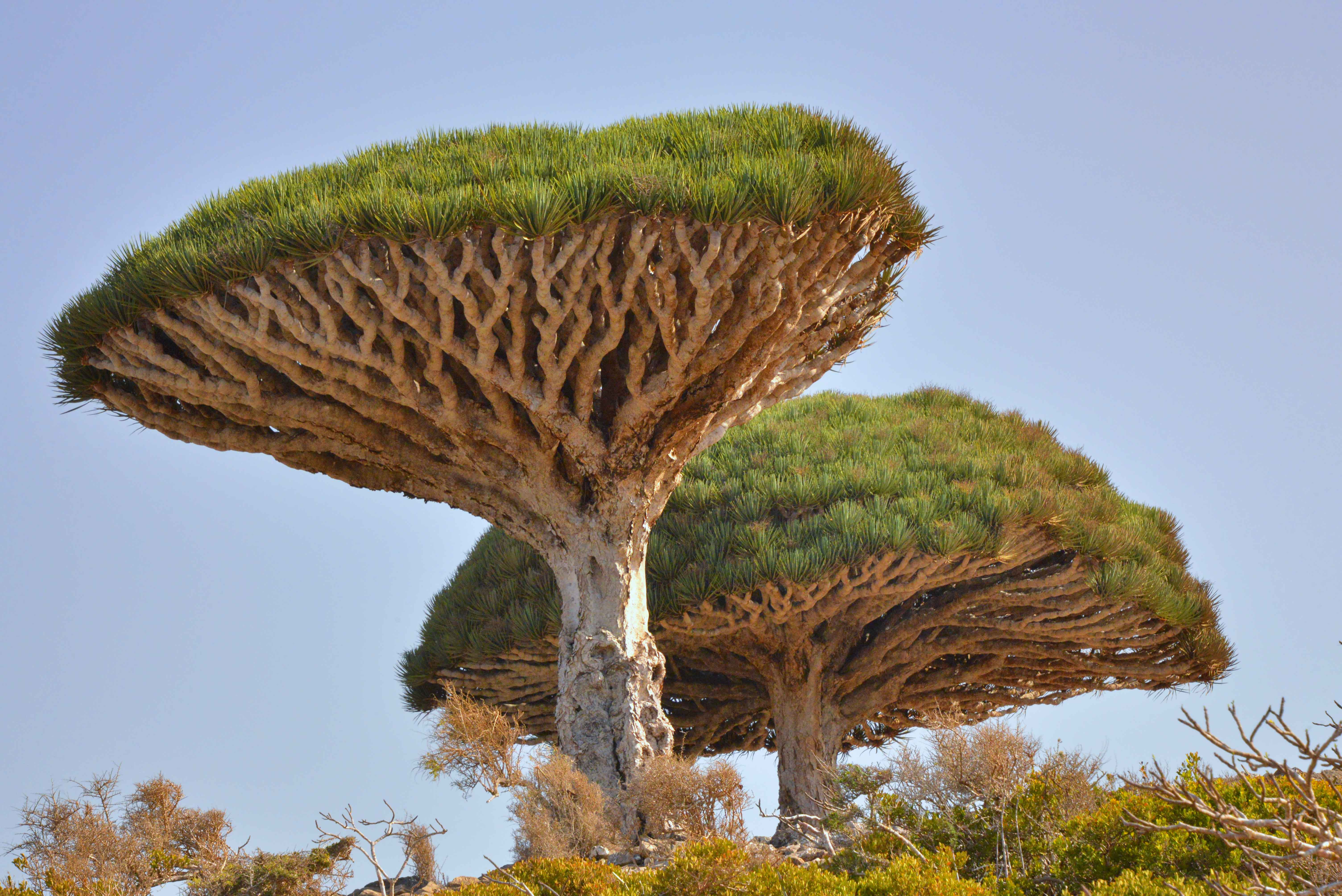
Dragon Blood Trees in Socotra

Due to the island's long arid periods, several endemic flora have developed an evolutionary strategy of longevity, prioritizing long individual life span over reproduction. These endemic flora are found in dry, low-lying areas of the island, and they grow slowly and rarely fruit or flower. These slow-growing endemic species are particularly vulnerable to climate warming, as increasing dry periods may prevent them from reproducing. One example is the Dragon's Blood Tree, or Dracaena cinnabari, which may be the most well known example of Socotran endemism. The tree contains a bright red sap which is used commercially. D. cinnabari has a very distinct appearance: its trunk branches out into an umbrella-like crown with tightly packed leaves and widespread branches. This plant structure is observed in arid climates which have atmospheric moisture. Tightly packed leaves and wide spread branches facilitate the condensation of water from moisture in the air, and the shade provided by the umbrella crown may prevent evaporation of moisture from the soil. One dragon's blood forest remains on the island. The average age of these trees is approximately 300 years. This suggests that the forest is over-mature, and indicates a decline in new growth.

=== Evolution ===
Socotra's high rates of species diversity and endemism can be attributed to a long period of isolation, as well as extreme climatic conditions which vary spatially and depending on altitude. These conditions have created a variety of ecological niches. Researchers have attempted to date the origins of endemic species in convergence with the geological timeline of the island, which may help discern instances of vicariant speciation after the island split off from the mainland.

Plant life on Socotra shares floristic similarities with northeast Africa and the Indian subcontinent. The genus Dirachma has two species – one is native to Socotra and the other is native to Somalia, over 1000 km away. These species share unique traits, including eight-part flowers. Several of the island's endemic species (members of the Echidnopsis genus, for example) are thought to have evolved from a single colonizing ancestor. Once the colonizing ancestor was cut off from its original gene pool its descendents began to diversify rapidly.

The most ecologically diverse parts of Socotra are its wet refugia, such as its cliffs and escarpments. These areas receive significantly more rainfall and mist than the rest of the island. These isolated areas in numerous separate areas on the island have allowed for speciation to occur. Species in the refugia are twice as likely to be endemic as species on the rest of the island. The refugia are particularly sensitive to changes in the climate, and have probably expanded and retracted many times over the evolutionary history of the island. The largest wet refugium on the island is the Hajhir massif. Fifty-five of the endemic species on the mountains are endemic to that particular refugium.

=== Current ecological threats ===
Socotra has experienced a steady decline of plants diversity over the past several decades. Its native flora are vital for the survival of endemic fauna. Several factors, such as erosion, extreme weather events, and overgrazing may be responsible for this decline. Intensified winds due to rising global temperatures threaten Socotra's old growth forests. Traditional land management which has been practiced by indigenous people on Socotra for thousands of years, is becoming less widespread as the island becomes more influenced by the outside world. Increasing populations of invasive species, such as rats and cats, also threaten the endemic flora and fauna. Species on Socotra have evolved in very particular climatic conditions, and their ranges are very restricted, making them highly vulnerable to climate change. Without intervention, many of the island's endemic species may face extinction, including potentially numerous cryptic species that have yet to be formally described.

== Demographics ==
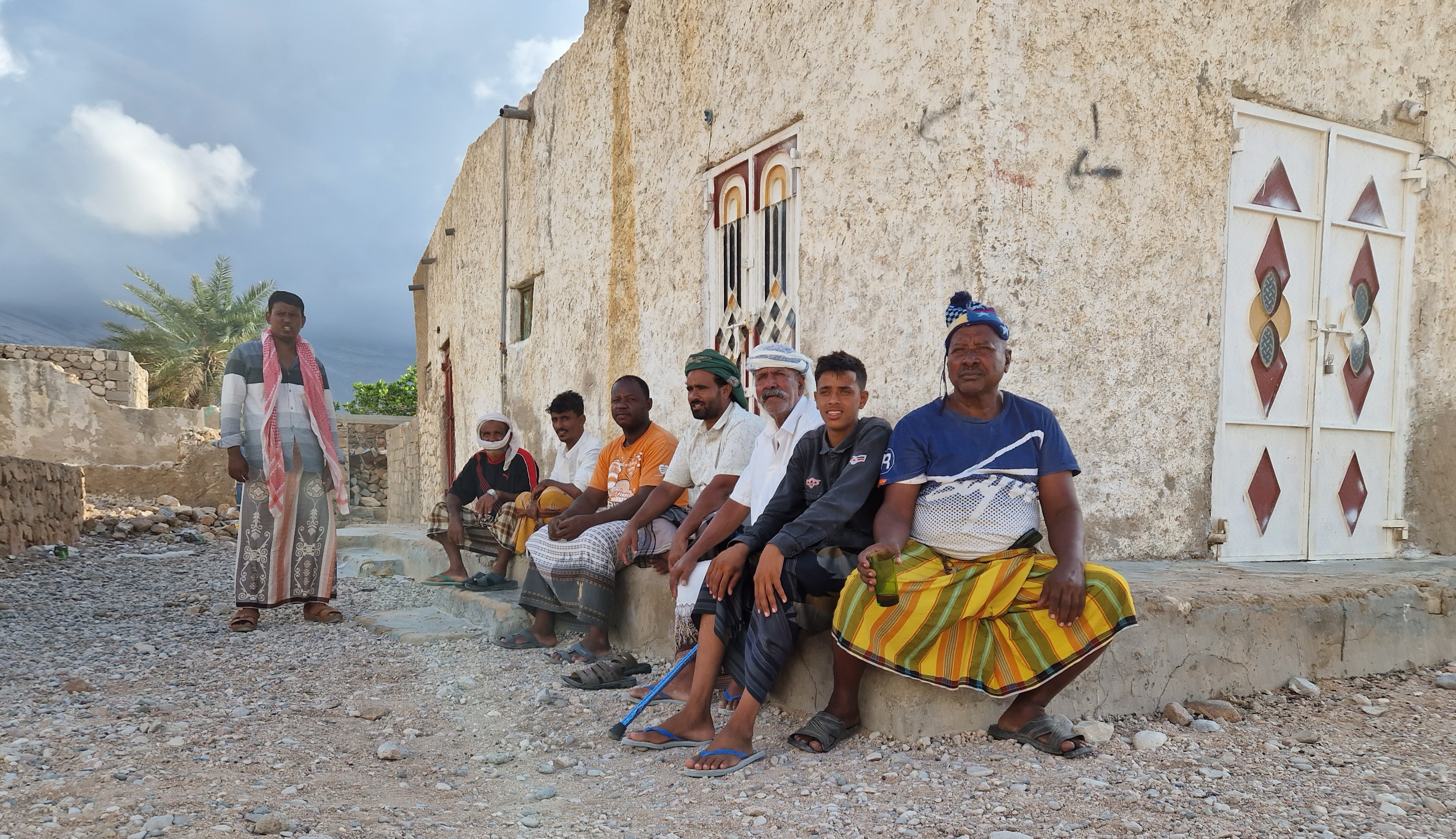
Men at the market square in Qulensya

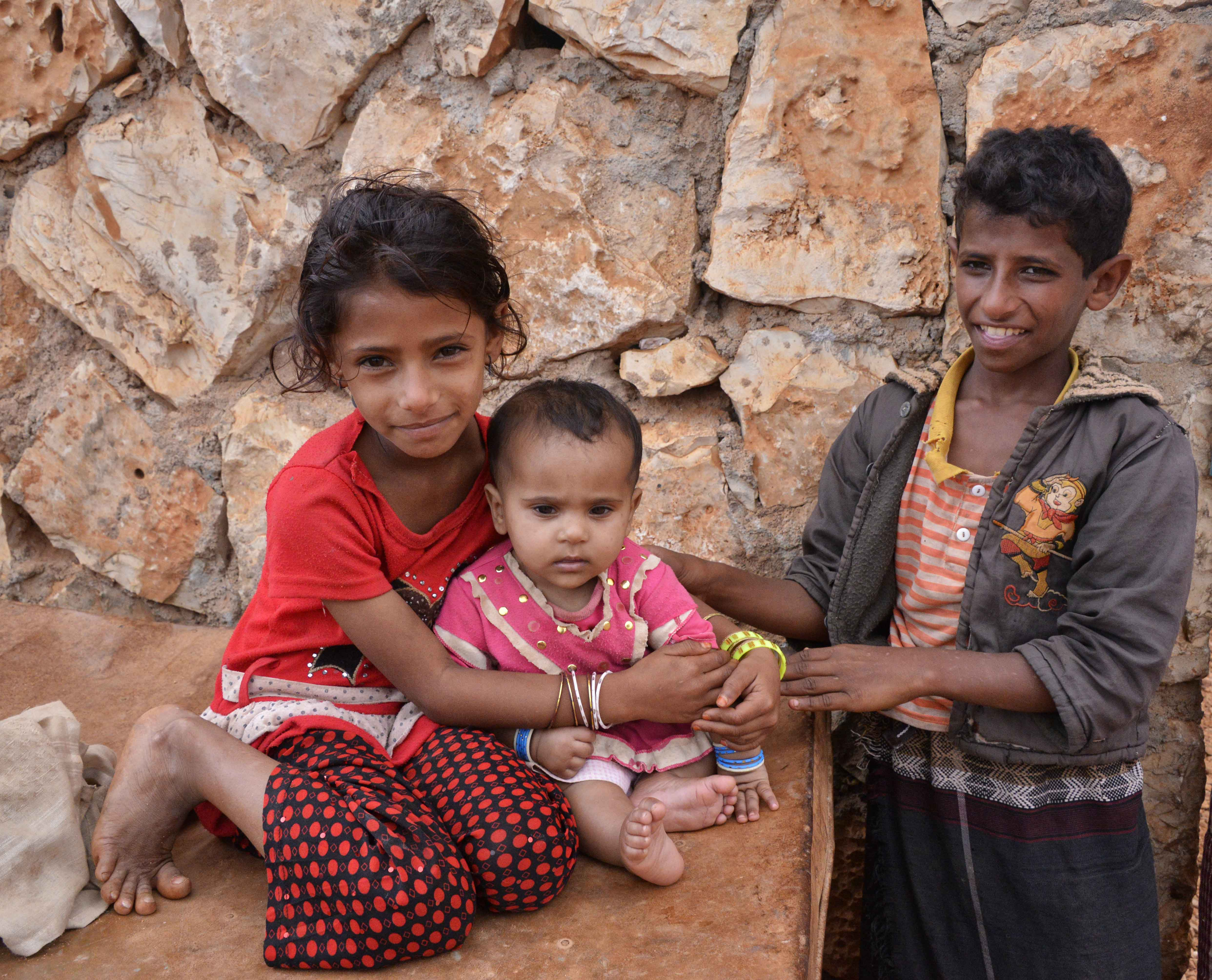
Socotran children

Most of the inhabitants are indigenous Soqotri people from Al-Mahrah tribe, who are of Southern Arabian descent from Al Mahrah Governorate, and are said to be especially closely related with the Qara and Mahra groups of Southern Arabia. Some of the inhabitants are African, descending from former slaves who settled on the island. The majority of male residents on Socotra are reported to be in the J* subclade of Y-DNA haplogroup J. Several of the female lineages, notably those in mtDNA haplogroup N, are unique to the island.

Almost all inhabitants of Socotra, numbering about 50,000, live on the main island of the archipelago. The principal city, Hadibu (with a population of 8,545 at the census of 2004); the second largest town, Qalansiyah (population 3,862); and Qād̨ub (population 929) are all located on the north coast of the island of Socotra. Only about 450 people live on 'Abd-al-Kūrī and 100 on Samha; the island of Darsa and the islets of the archipelago are uninhabited.

=== Language ===
The island is home to the Semitic language Soqotri, which is related to such other Modern South Arabian languages on the Arabian mainland as Mehri, Harsusi, Bathari, Shehri, and Hobyot, which became the subject of European academic study in the nineteenth century.

There is an ancient tradition of poetry and a poetry competition is held annually on the island. The first attested Socotran poet is believed to be the ninth-century Fatima al-Suqutriyya, a popular figure in Socotran culture. Socotra Swahili is extinct.

=== Religion ===
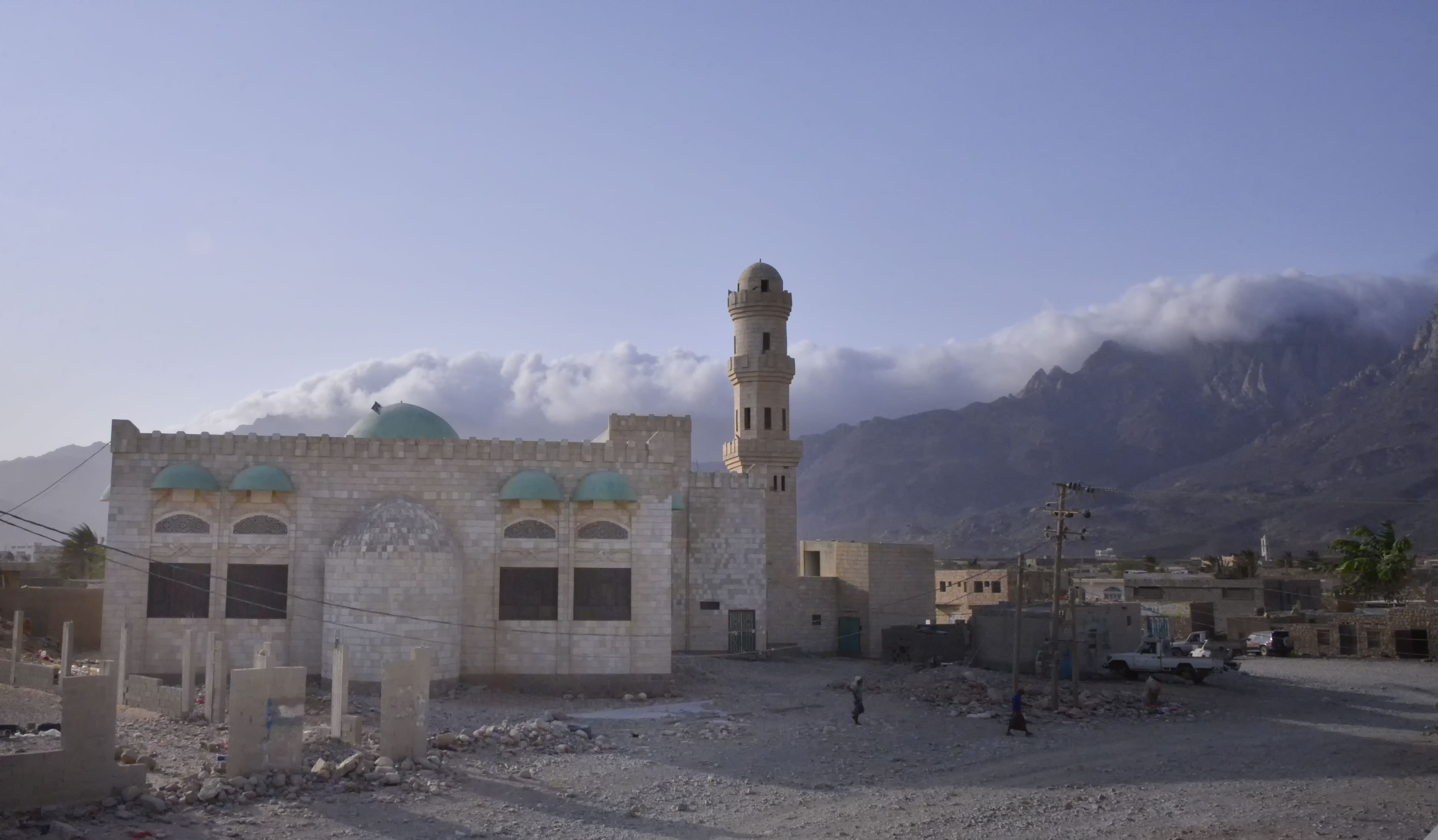
A mosque in Hadibu showcasing the local architecture

The earliest account concerning the presence of Christians in Socotra stems from the early-medieval 6th century AD Greek merchant Cosmas Indicopleustes. Later the Socotrans joined the Assyrian church. During the 10th century, Arab geographer Abu Muhammad al-Hasan al-Hamdani recorded during his visits that most of the islanders were Christian.

Christianity went into decline when the Mahra Sultanate took power in the 16th century, and the populace had become mostly Muslim by the time the Portuguese arrived later that century. An 1884 edition of Nature writes that the disappearance of Christian churches and monuments can be accounted for by a Wahhabi excursion to the island in 1800. Today the only remnants of Christianity are some cross engravings from the first century CE, a few Christian tombs, and some church ruins.

== Transport ==
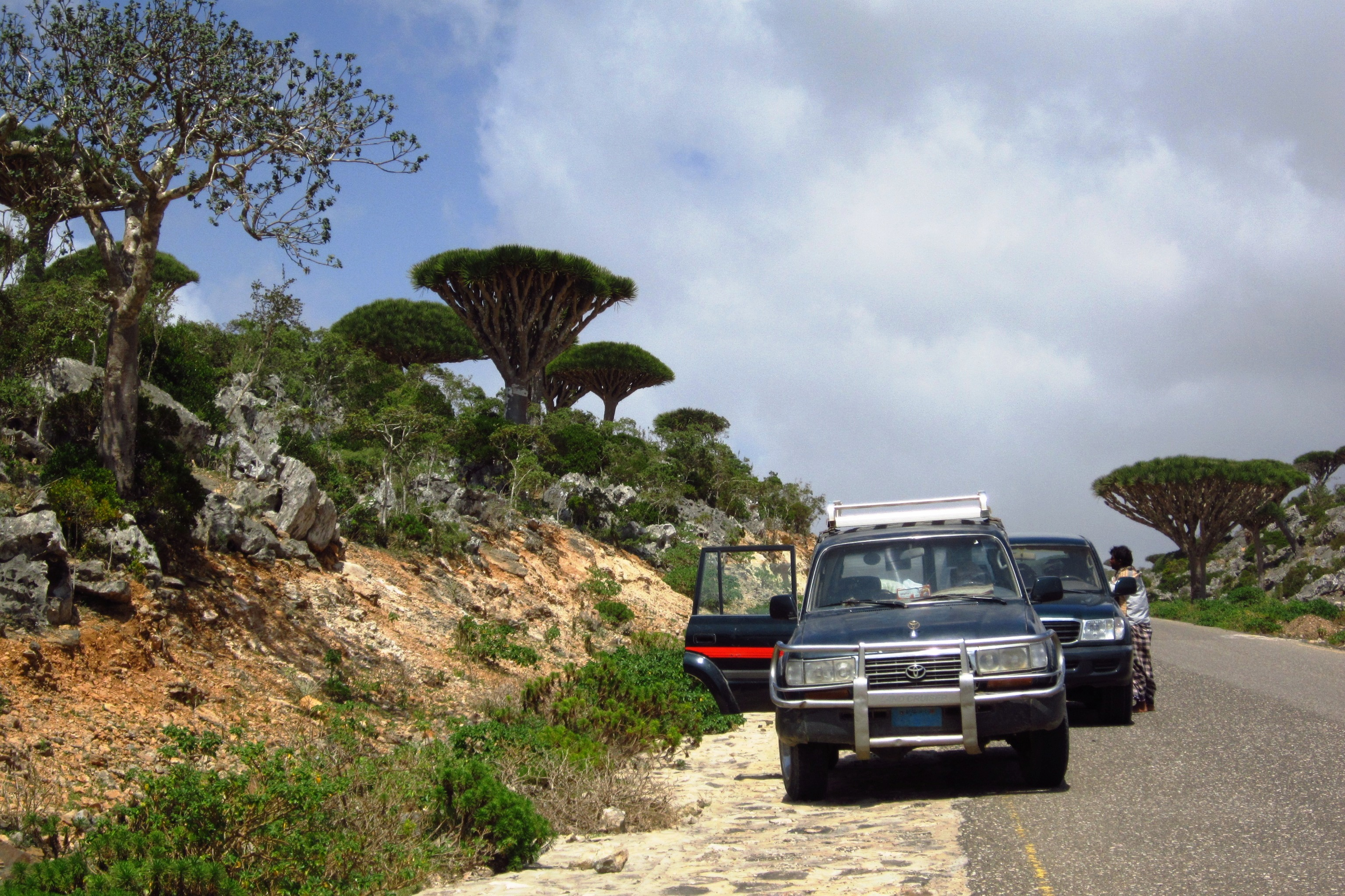
Toyota Land Cruisers parked next to Dragon's blood trees

Public transport on Socotra is limited to a few minibuses; car hire usually means hiring a 4WD car and a driver. Transport is a delicate matter on Socotra as road construction is considered locally to be detrimental to the island and its ecosystem. In particular, damage has occurred via chemical pollution from road construction while new roads have resulted in habitat fragmentation.

The only port on Socotra is 5 kilometres (3 miles) east of Hadibu. Ships connect the port with the Yemeni coastal city of Mukalla. The journey takes two to three days, and the service is used mostly for cargo. The UAE funded the modernization of the port on Socotra.

Yemenia and Felix Airways flew from Socotra Airport to Sanaa and Aden via Riyan Airport. After March 2015, due to ongoing civil war involving Saudi Arabia's Air Force, all flights to and from Socotra were cancelled. During the deployment of Emirati troops and aid to the island, multiple flight connections were made between Abu Dhabi and Socotra as part of Emirati efforts to provide Socotra residents with access to free healthcare and provide work opportunities. Currently, Yemenia has scheduled flights twice a week from Jeddah to Socotra.

== Tourism ==
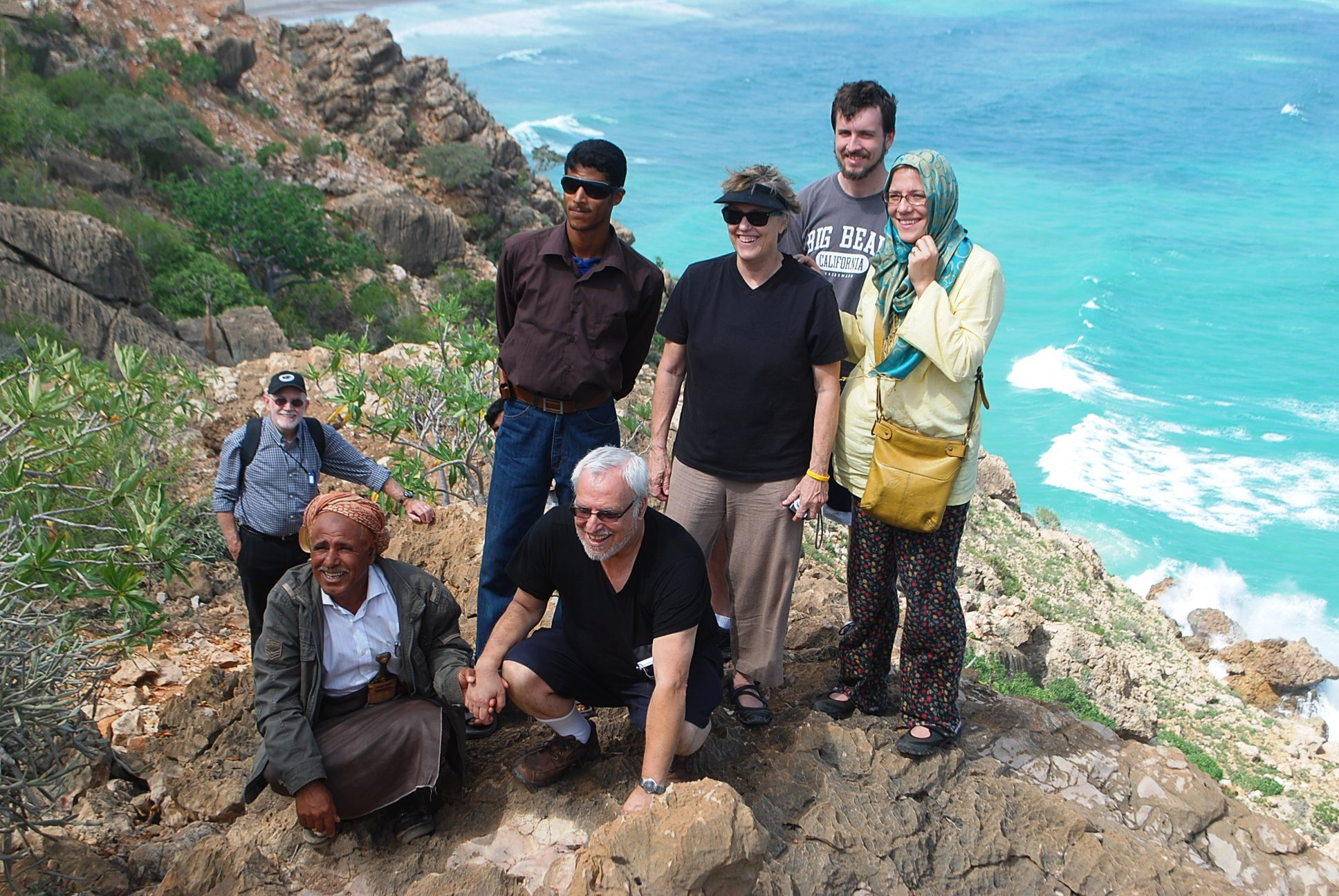
Tourists posing for a picture with locals

Among 19th-century visitors to the island came British celebrity explorers Theodore and Mabel Bent, and their party, from mid December 1896 to mid February 1897.

Prior to the construction of the Socotra airport, the island could only be reached by a cargo ship. The ideal time to visit Socotra is from October to April; the remaining months usually have heavy monsoon rainfall, making it difficult for tourists; flights also usually get cancelled. The island lacks any well-established hotels, although there are a few guesthouses for travelers to stay during their short visits. The island received over 1,000 tourists each year until 2014, but has since been affected by the civil war.

Tourism to the island has increased over the years as many operators have begun offering trips to the island, which Gulf Today claimed "will become a dream destination despite the country's conflict". In May 2021, the Ministry of Information stated that the UAE is violating the island and has been planning to control it for years, running illegal trips there for foreign tourists without obtaining any permission from the Yemeni government. In early 2026, hundreds of European and American tourists were stranded on the island, as a state of emergency was declared causing the closure of all ports. Later, 609 tourists were flown to Jeddah.

== Gallery ==
Other sights

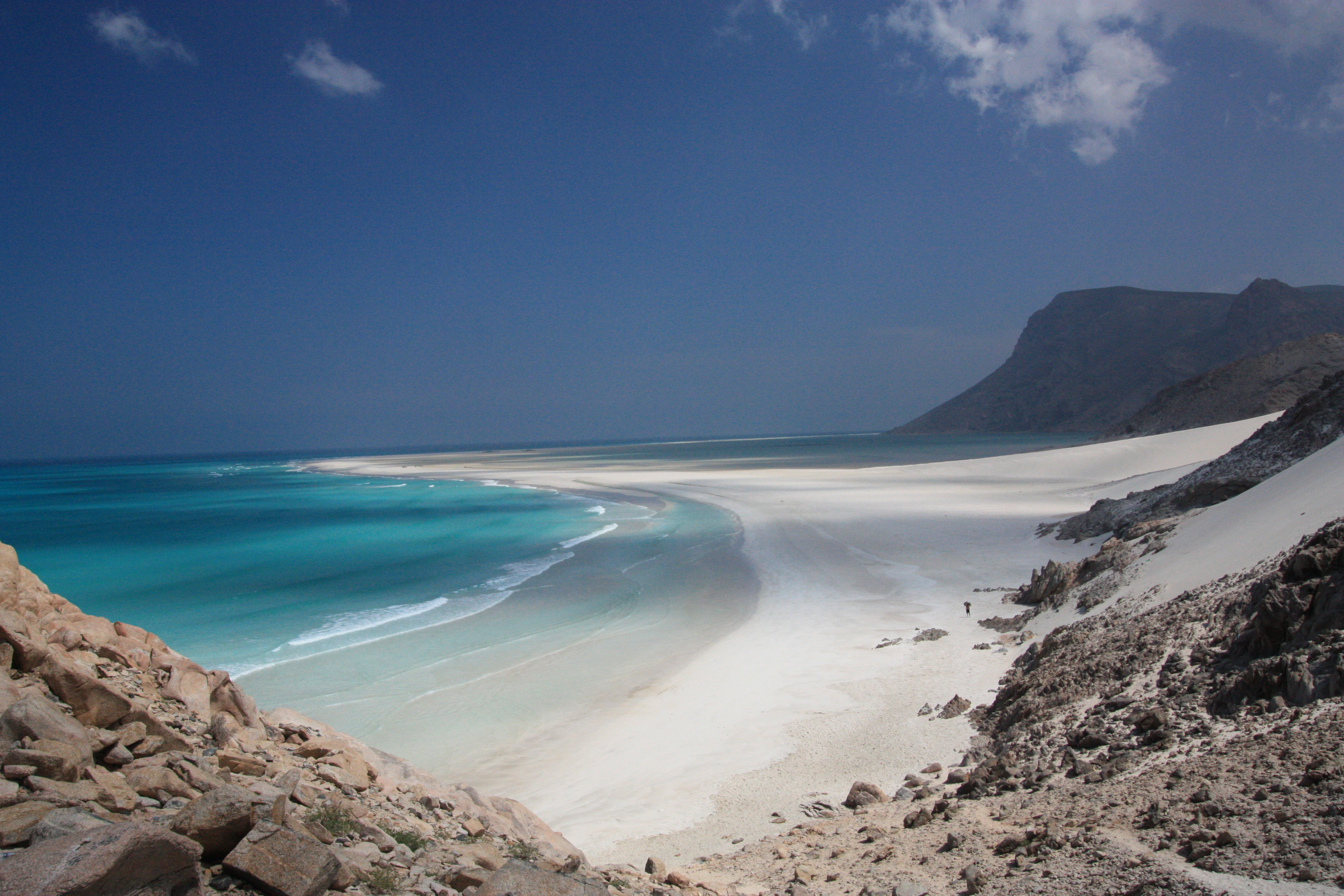
Qalansiyah

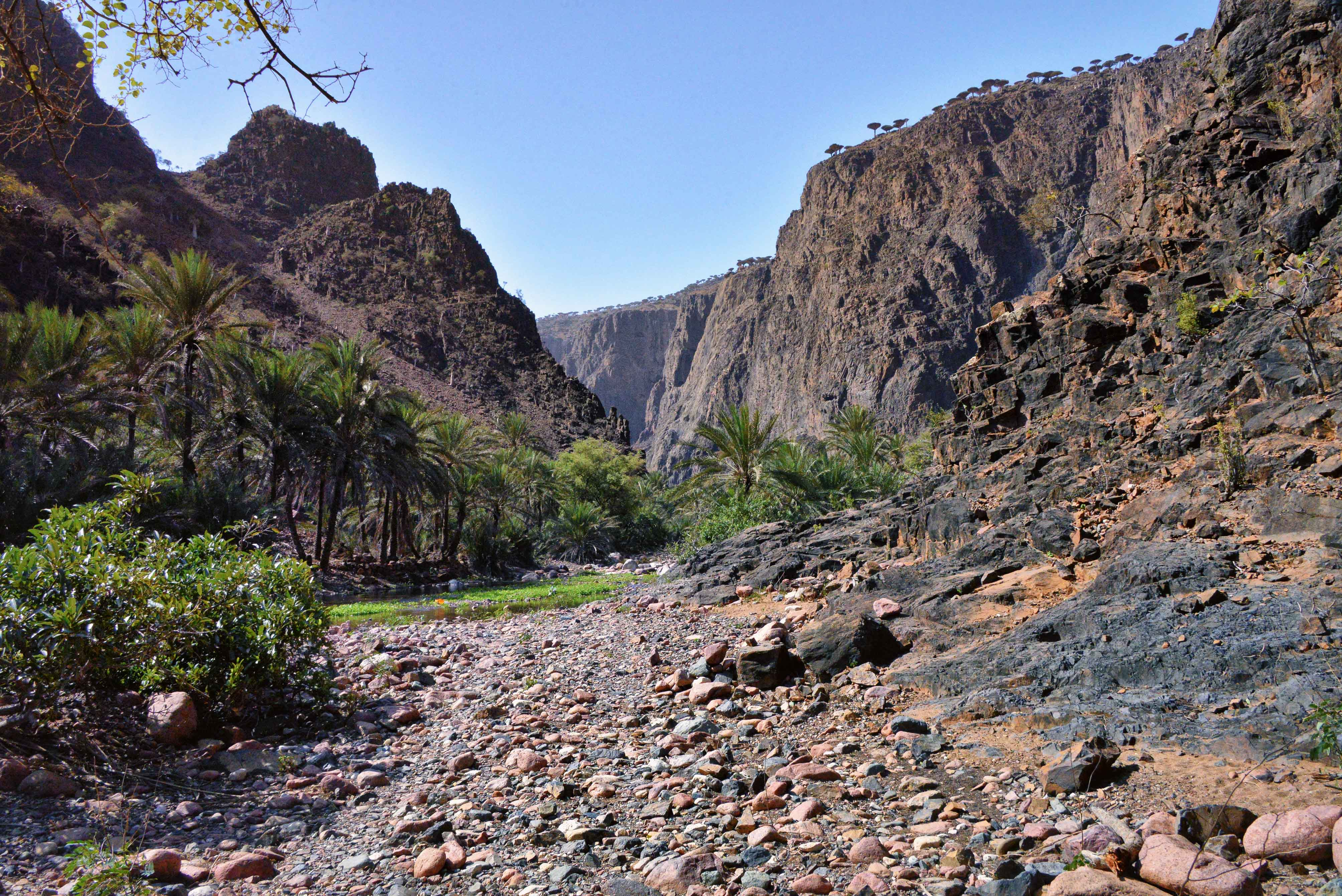
Wadi Dirhur canyon on the Diksam Plateau

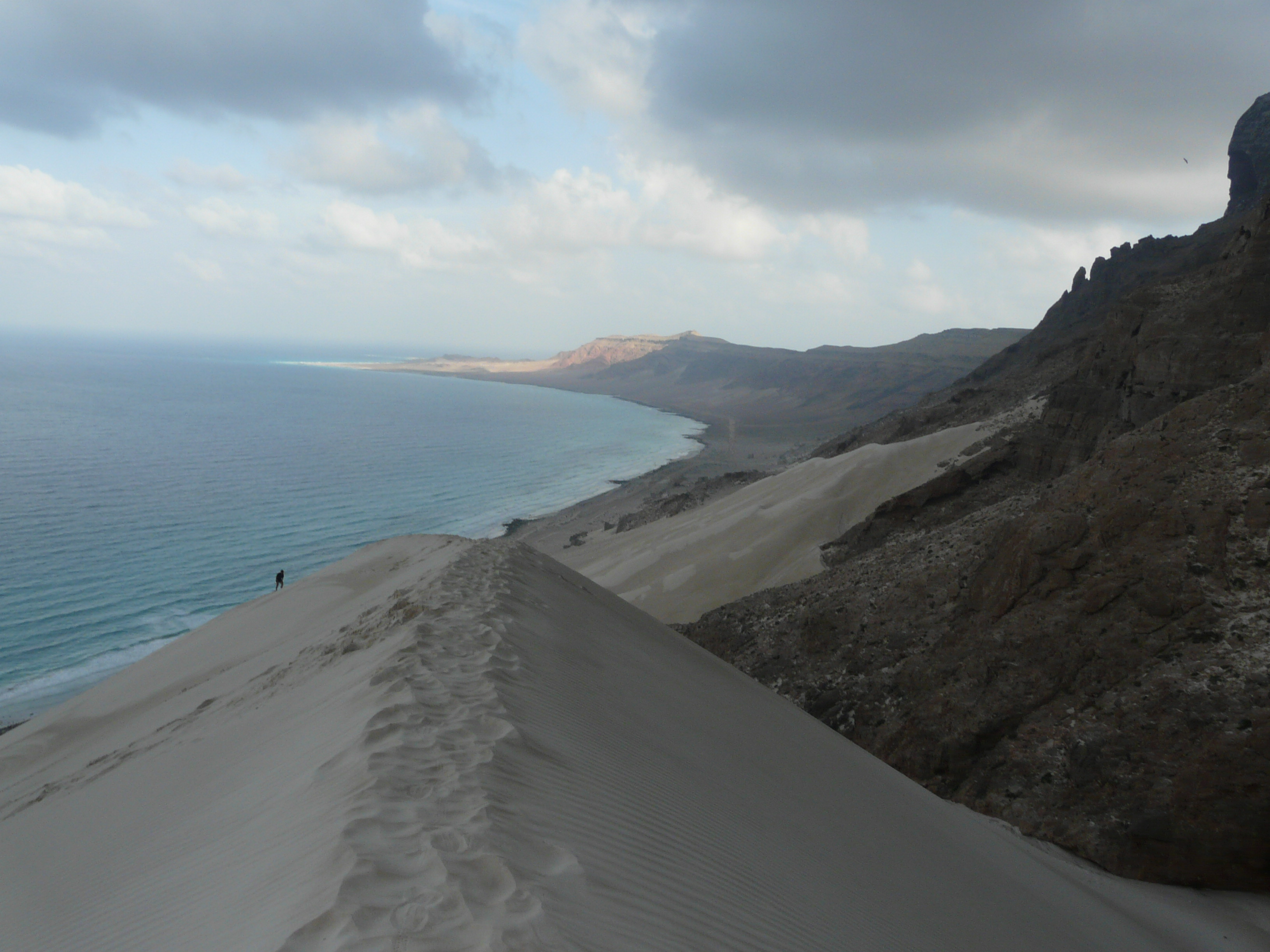
Ar'ar spot

== See also ==
- Galápagos Islands, an archipelago of Ecuador which is also famous for its isolated geography and plant and animal species
- Channel Islands (California), an archipelago famous for its unique endemic species
- Masirah Island, another island with a rugged terrain off the coast of the Arabian Peninsula
- List of islands of Yemen
