= Socotra Governorate =

Archipelago in the Indian Ocean and governorate of Yemen

Socotra Archipelago أرخبيل سقطرى (Arabic)
- Governorate
- Socotra Archipelago Governorate
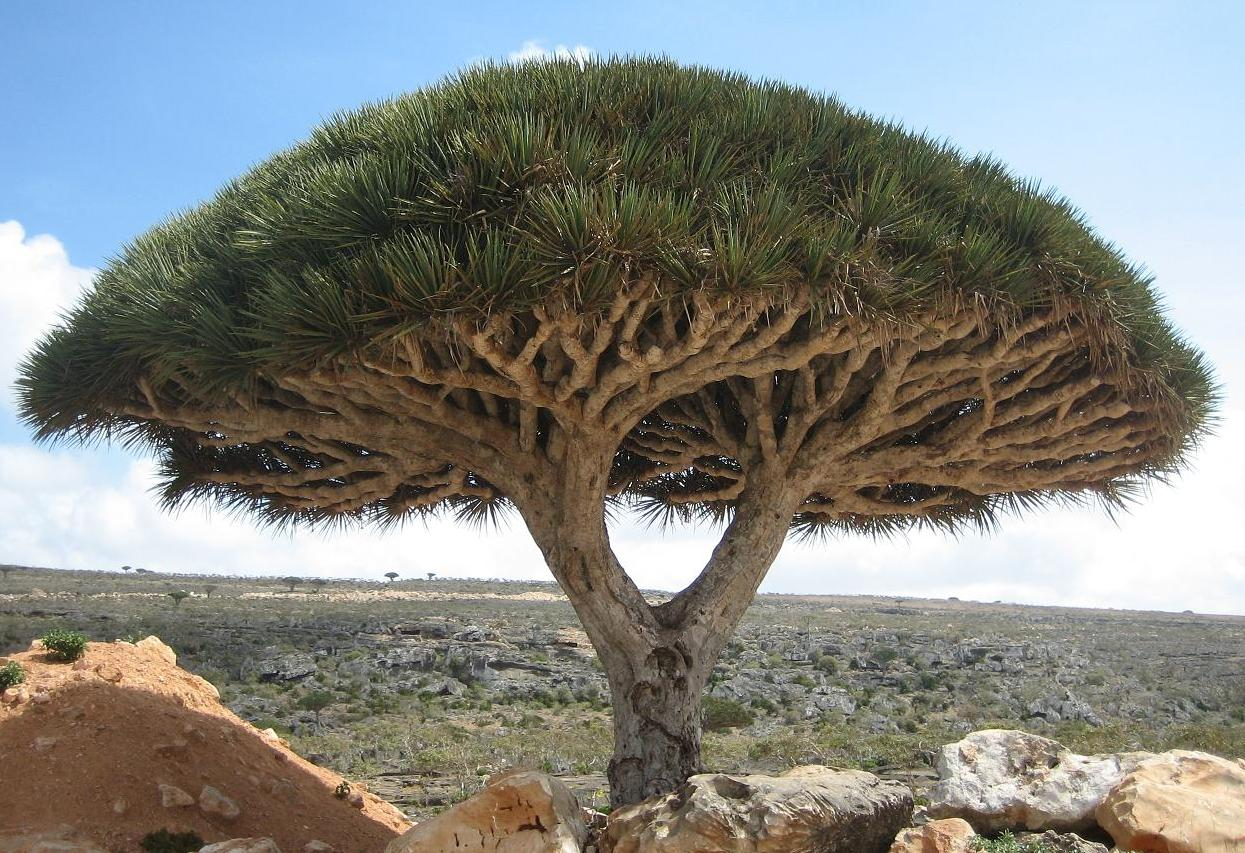
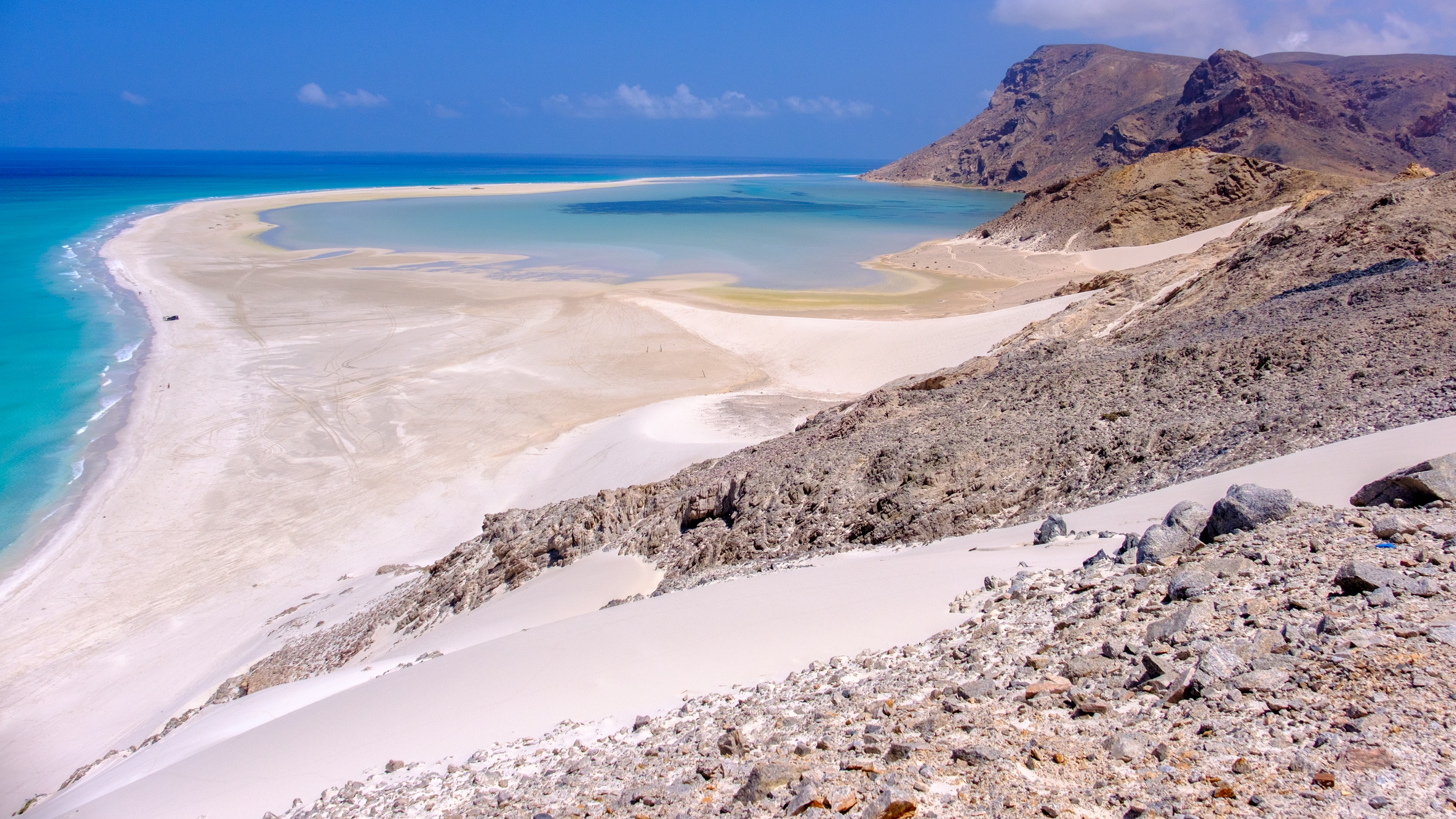
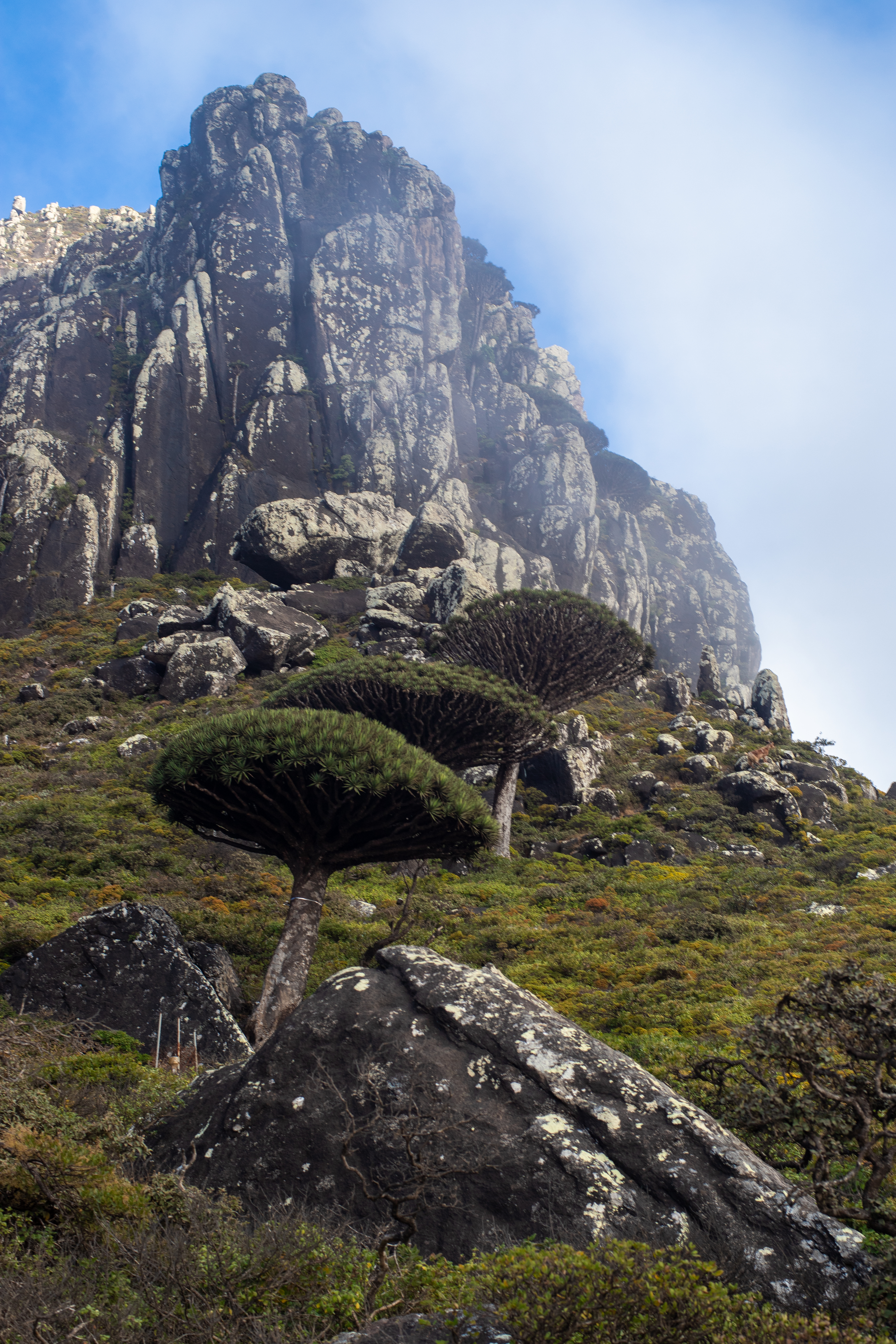
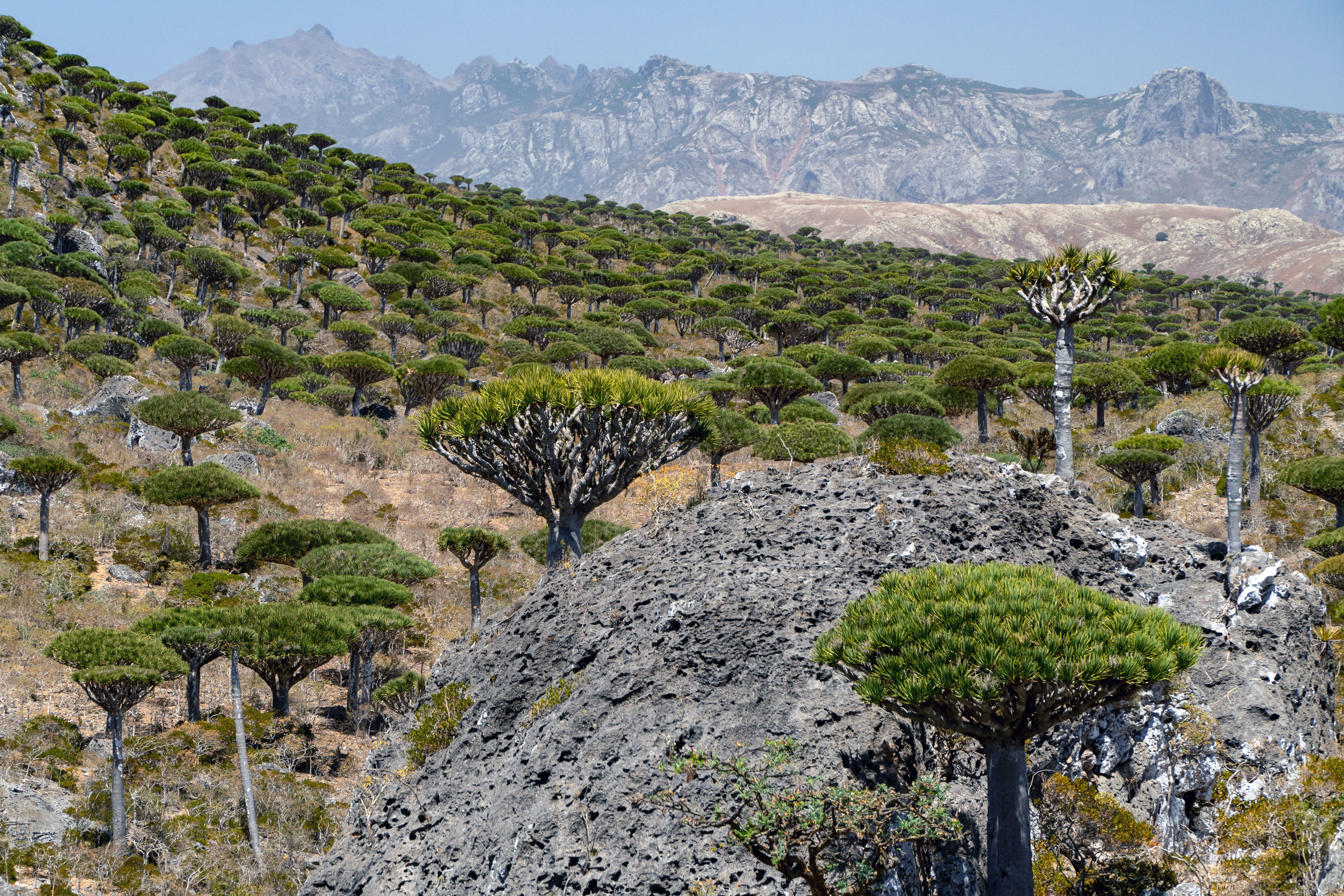
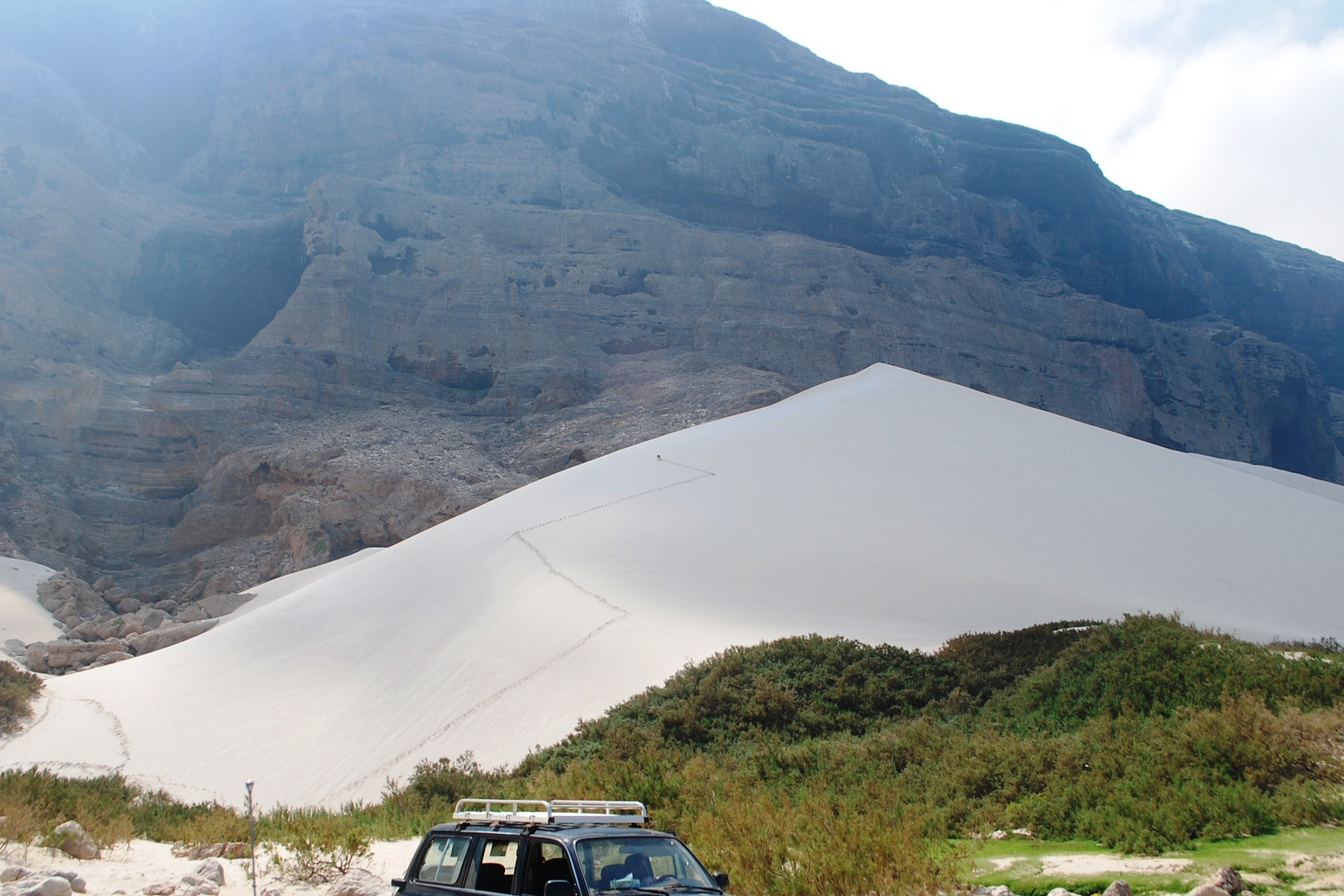
- Dracaena cinnabari, also known as the Dragon's Blood tree Detwah Lagoon in Qalansiyah Jabal Skand, highest point in the Hajhir Mountain range Ferhmin Forest in the Diksam Plateau Arher dunes and the Hoq Cave

- Location of the archipelago in Yemen

- Topographic map of the districts of Socotra
- Coordinates: 12.5°N 53.4°E
- Country: Yemen
- Districts: Hadibu (east); Qulansiyah wa 'Abd-al-Kūrī (west)
- Capital: Hadibu

Government
  - Governor: Raafat Ali Ibrahim Al-Thuqli

Area
  - Land: 3,973.64 km^{2} (1,534.23 sq mi)

Population (2004)
  - Total: 44,670
  - Density: 11.24/km^{2} (29.12/sq mi)
- ISO 3166 code: YE-SU
- Socotra Archipelago
- Interactive map of Socotra Archipelago
- Total islands: 4 + two rocky islets
- Major islands: Socotra, Abd al Kuri, Samhah, Darsah

UNESCO World Heritage Site
- Official name: Socotra Archipelago
- Type: Natural
- Criteria: x
- Designated: 2008 (32nd session)
- Reference no.: 1263
- Region: Arab States

The Socotra Archipelago (Arabic: أرخبيل سقطرى, romanized: ʾArḫabīl Suquṭrā), officially the Socotra Archipelago Governorate (Arabic: محافظة أرخبيل سقطرى, romanized: Muḥāfaẓat ʾArḫabīl Suquṭrā), abbreviated to Socotra Governorate (Arabic: محافظة سقطرى, romanized: Muḥāfaẓat Suquṭrā), is one of the governorates of Yemen. It consists of four larger islands and three small islets in the Indian Ocean south of mainland Yemen and east of the Horn of Africa. The largest island is Socotra.

== Etymology ==
Scholars' views vary regarding the origin of the island's name. One theory is that the term Socotra may derive from a Greek name that is derived from the name of a South Arabian tribe mentioned in Sabaic and Ḥaḍramitic inscriptions as Dhū-Śakūrid (s³krd). Another theory is that the Arabic term Suqutra breaks down as follows: suq means 'market', and qutra is a vulgar form of qatir, which refers to dragon's blood. The capital city of Socotra was Suq as reported by the Portuguese in the 16th century, which they referred to as market place.

== History ==
Since before British rule, Socotra had been part of the Mahra Sultanate but later the British captured it and made Socotra a part of Bombay Presidency in British India and so it remained till 1937. In 1937 British made it part of Aden Protectorate. With the independence of South Yemen in 1967, the archipelago was attached to the Aden Governorate, despite its distance. In 2004, it was moved to the Hadhramaut Governorate.

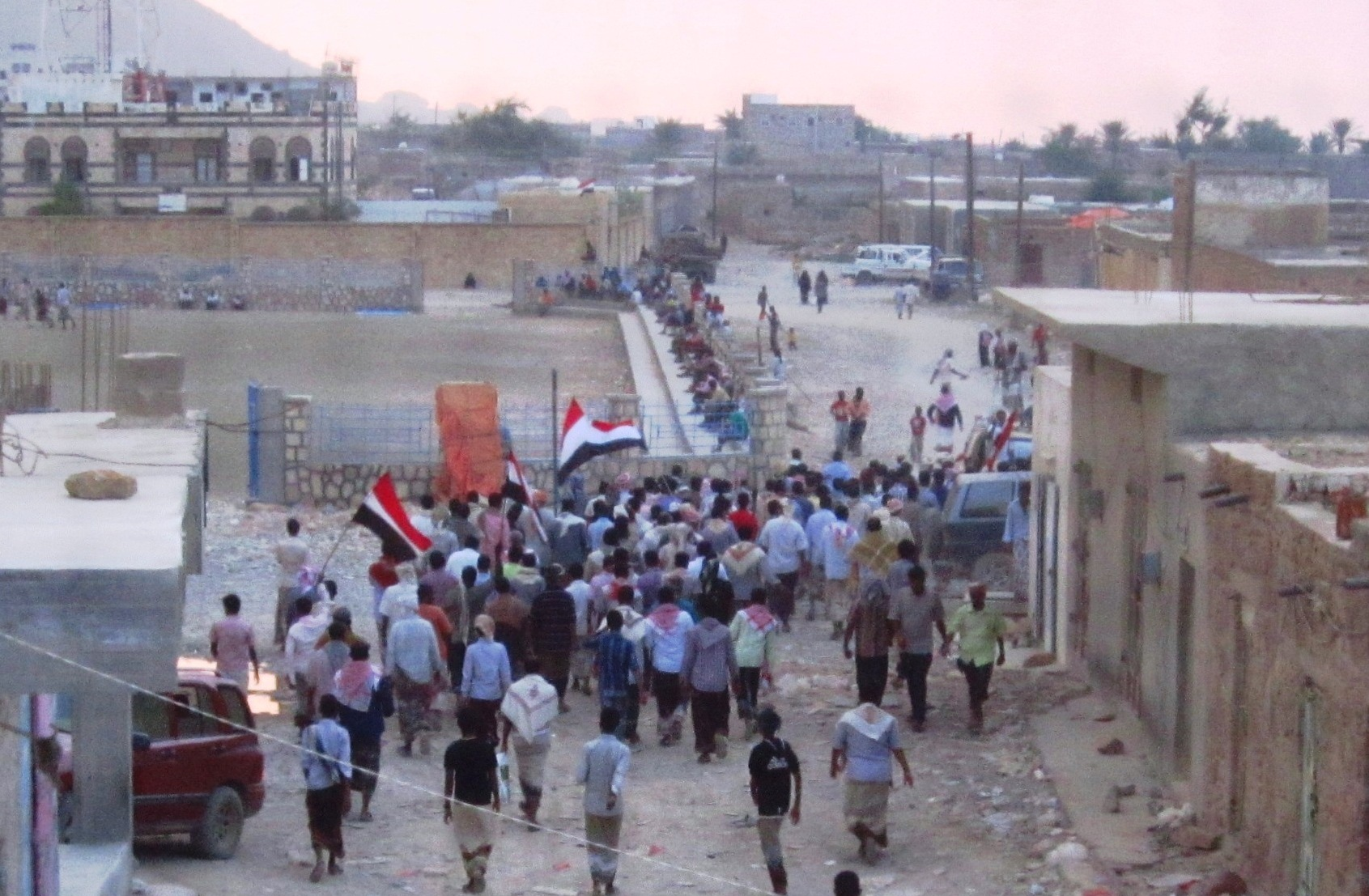
Protests in Hadibu, November 2011

The formation of the Socotra governorate is linked to the desire of Socotrans for greater political autonomy and direct governance. During the Arab Spring in 2011, Socotrans expressed opposition to the proposed "Socotra Authority", advocating for the archipelago to be integrated more closely into the mainland's administrative structure. They sought to elevate Socotra from its division from two local districts under the governorate of Hadhramaut to a single governorate. This change was aimed at ensuring that all funds allocated to Socotra would reach its elected local councils directly, rather than being channeled through Hadhramaut, where they feared embezzlement or misallocation. Since December 2013, it has been a governorate of its own.

On 30 April 2018, the United Arab Emirates, as a part of the ongoing Yemen Civil War, deployed troops and took administrative control of Socotra Airport and seaport. On 14 May 2018, Saudi troops were also deployed on the island and a deal was brokered between the United Arab Emirates and Yemen for a joint military training exercise and the return of administrative control of Socotra's airport and seaport to Yemen.

The Southern Transitional Council seized control of the archipelago in June 2020, and controlled it until January 2026.

== Geography ==
The archipelago consists of four larger islands, Socotra, Abd al Kuri, Samhah, and Darsah, and three small islets to the north of the archipelago. Socotra has most of archipelago's land mass and population. Abd al Kuri and Samhah are also inhabited. The islands are located between 12° 06′ and 12° 42′ N and 52° 03′ and 54° 32′ E.

The islands lie east of the Horn of Africa, separated from Cape Guardafui in Somalia by the Guardafui Channel. Abd Al Kuri is the westernmost island, located about 100 km from Cape Guardafui. Socotra is the easternmost approximately 380 km south of the Arabian Peninsula and 225 km east of Cape Guardafui. Samhah and Darsah, known as The Brothers, are southwest of Socotra and east of Abd al Kuri.

The islands are composed largely of limestone. The Hajhir Mountains on Socotra have areas of exposed granite.

The lowlands have a mostly arid climate, averaging 150 mm of annual precipitation. Most of the rainfall occurs during the northeast monsoon in the winter months (November–March). The southwest monsoon brings drying winds from the African continent during the summer months (April–October). Sea-facing slopes and mountainous areas receive more moisture from sea fogs and orographic precipitation, with up to 1000 mm annually at high elevations in the Hajhir Mountains. Year-round rivers and streams are found only in the mountains of Socotra.

Island / Islet	Coordinates	Area (km^{2})	Population
Socotra	12°30′36″N 53°55′12″E	3,796	44,120
Abd al Kuri	12°11′24″N 52°13′30″E	130.2	450
Samhah	12°09′20″N 53°02′30″E	39.6	100
Darsah	12°07′10″N 53°16′30″E	7.5	0
Ka'l Fir'awn (north)	12°26′26″N 52°08′17″E	0.17	0
Ka'l Fir'awn (south)	12°26′14″N 52°08′02″E	0.12	0
Sabuniyah	12°38′12″N 53°09′27″E	0.05	0

=== Geology ===
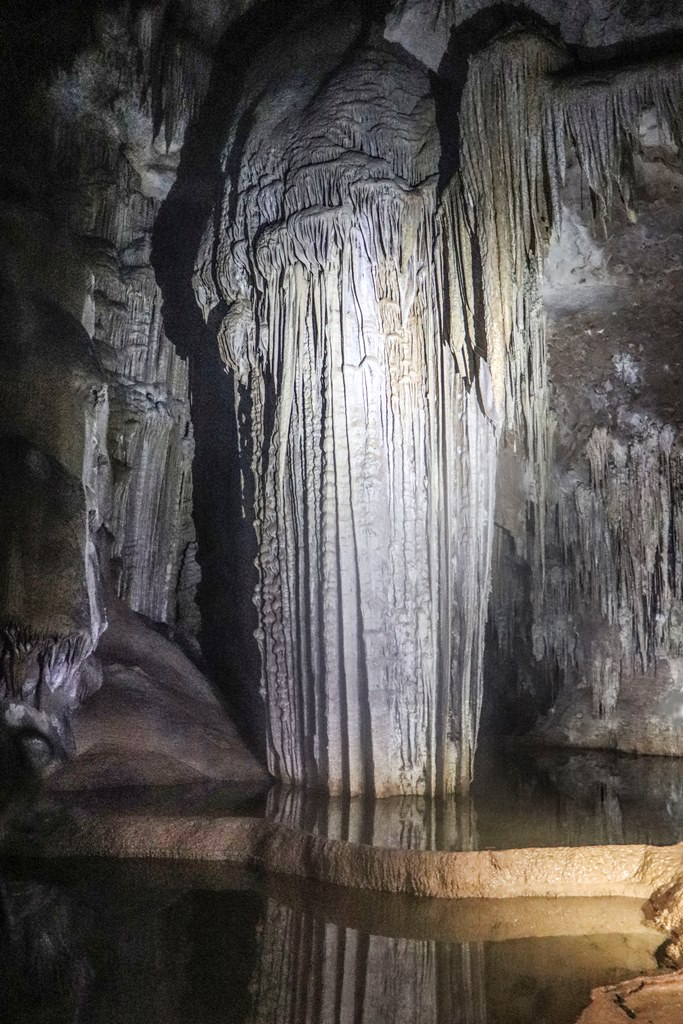
Hawk Cave (Arabic: كهف هوق) in the east of the island

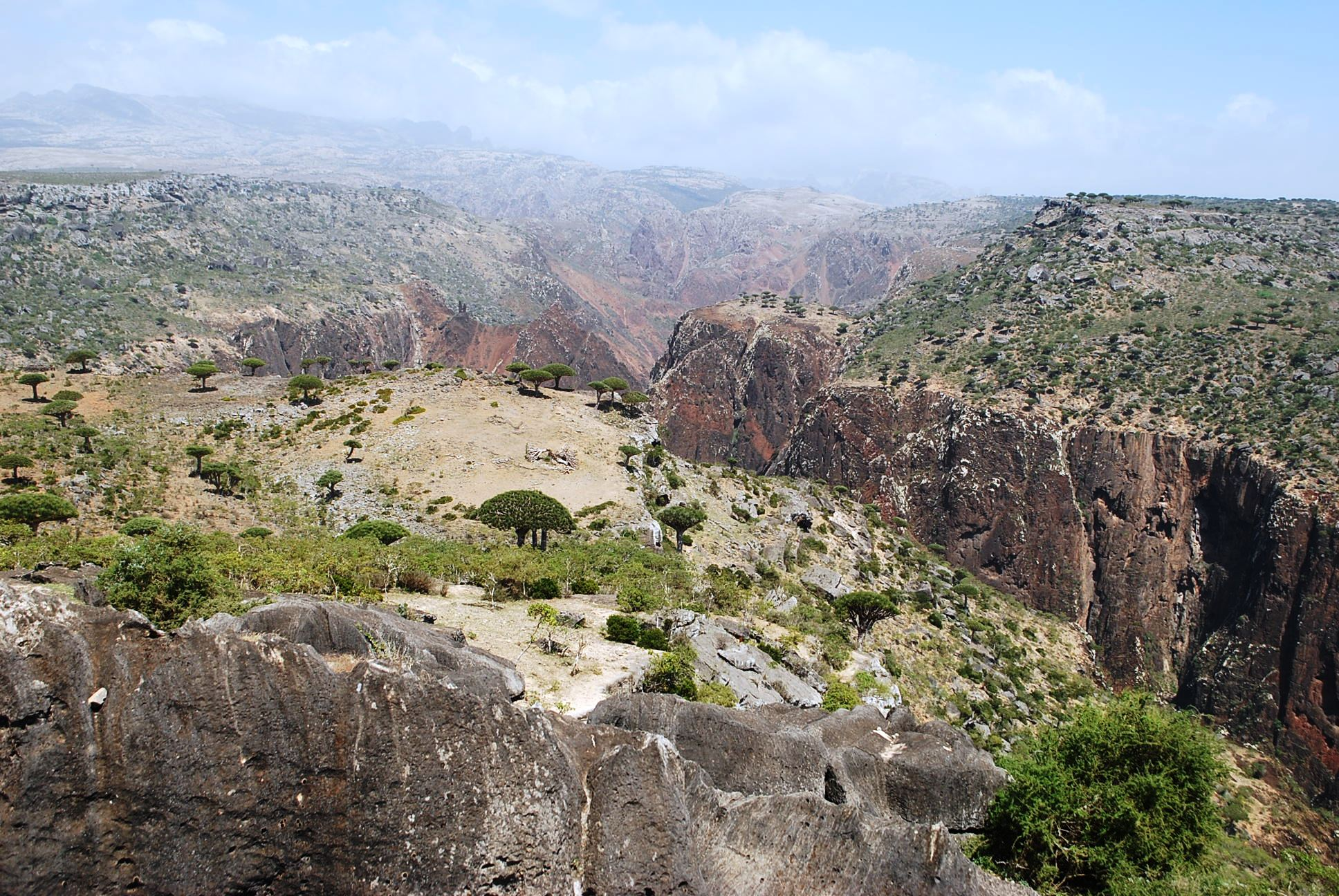
Diksam Plateau

Socotra is one of the most isolated landforms on Earth of continental origin (i.e. not of volcanic origin). The archipelago was once part of the supercontinent of Gondwana and detached during the Miocene epoch, in the same set of rifting events that opened the Gulf of Aden to its northwest. Culturally and politically, the island is a part of Yemen, but geographically it belongs to Africa as it represents a continental fragment that is geologically linked to the continental African Somali Plate.

The archipelago consists of the main island of Socotra (3,665 km^{2} or 1,415 sq mi), three smaller islands, Abd al Kuri, Samhah and Darsa, and two rocky islets, Ka'l Fir'awn and Sābūnīyah, both uninhabitable by humans but important for seabirds. The island is about 125 kilometres (78 mi) long and 45 kilometres (28 mi) north to south. and has three major physical regions:

- The narrow coastal plains with its characteristic dunes, formed by monsoon winds blowing during three summer months. The wind takes up the coast sand in a spiral and, as a result, forms the snow-white Socotran sand dunes.
- The limestone plateaus of Momi, Homhil and Diksam with its characteristic karst topography based on limestone rock areas intersected with inter-hill plains. For centuries until recently Socotra's main economic activity was subsistent transhumant animal husbandry, predominantly goats and sheep on these plateaus. The outcome is a unique and still active cultural landscape of agro-pastoralism with its characteristic rainwater harvesting systems.
- A central massif, the Hajhir Mountains, composed of granite and metamorphic rocks. rising to 1,503 metres (4,931 ft).
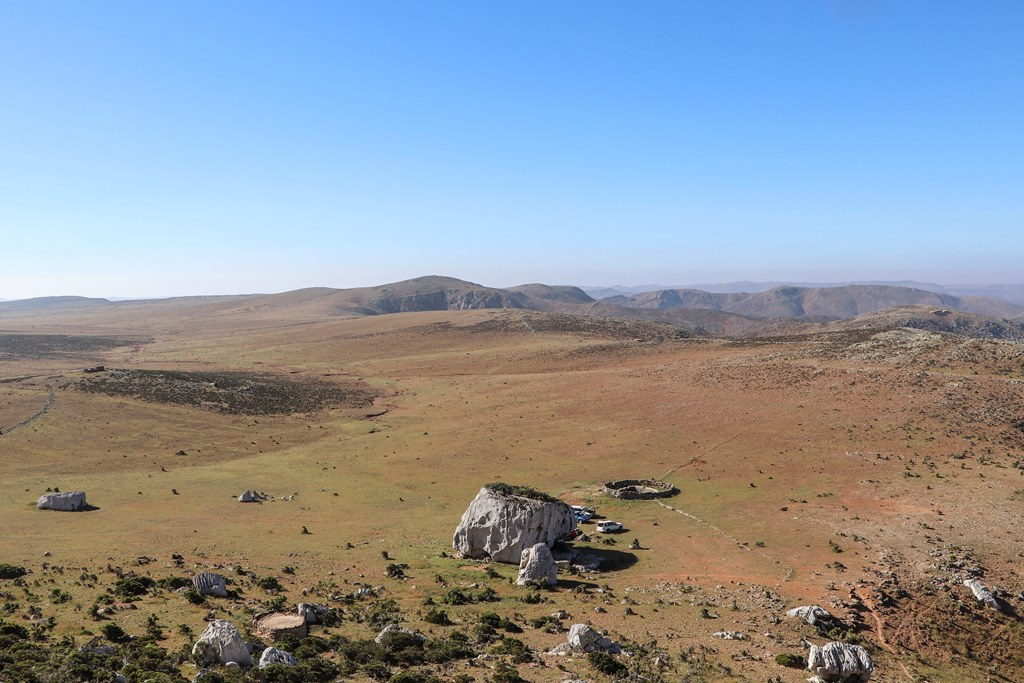
Momi Plateau with rainwater harvest structures, water storage body, shelter for herders

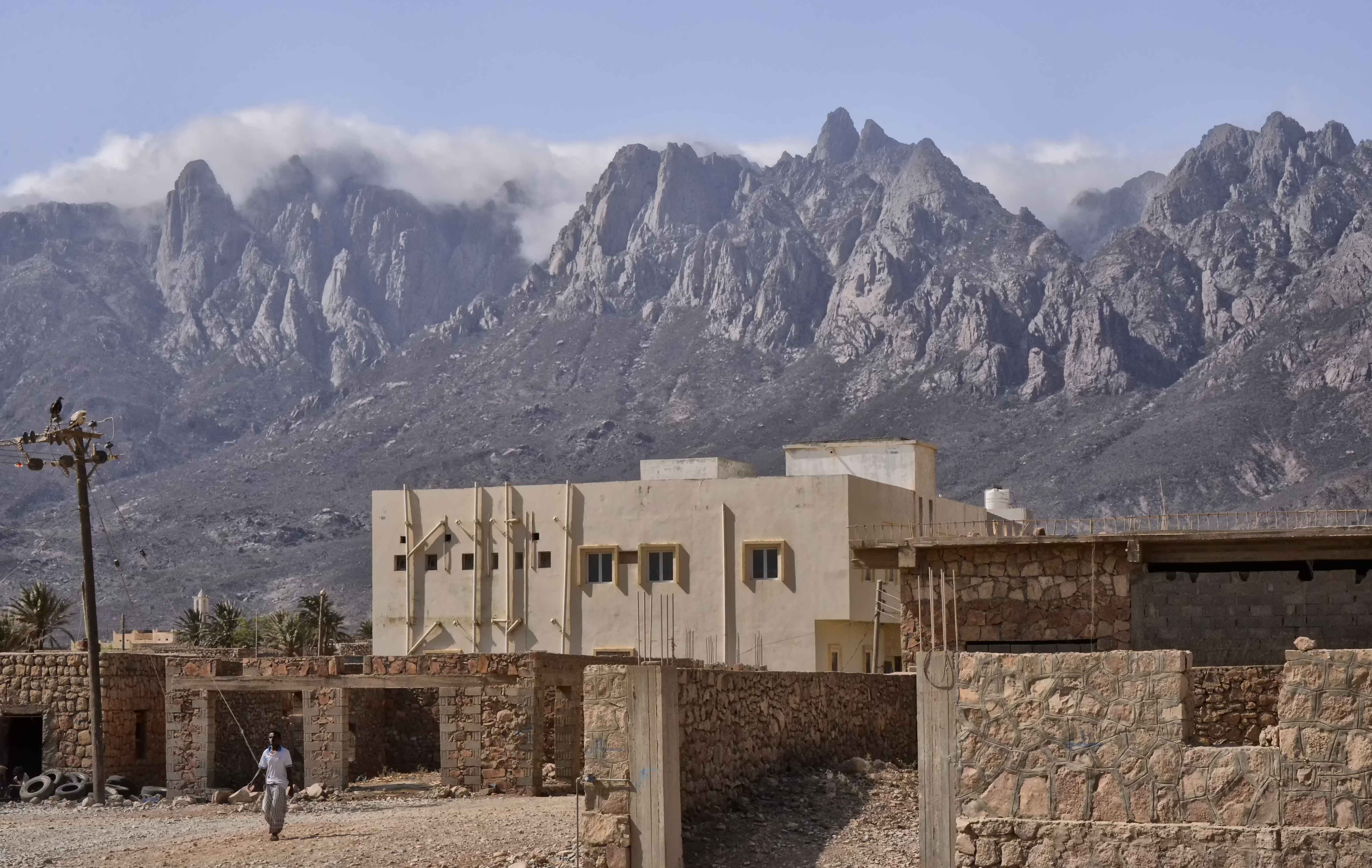
Hajhir Mountains

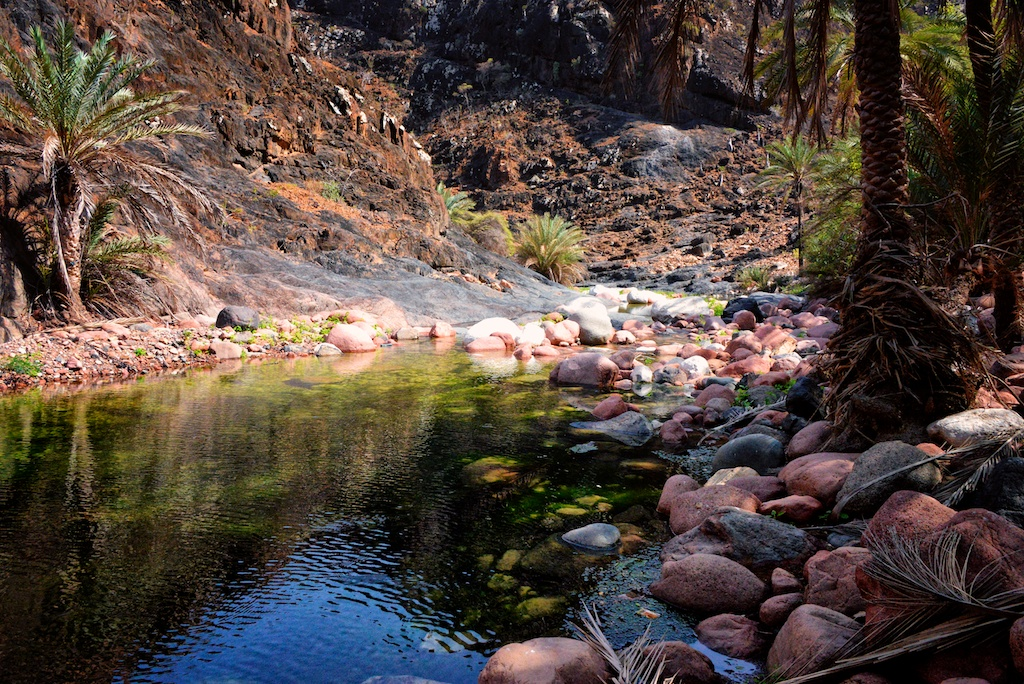
A wadi in Socotra

== Ecology ==
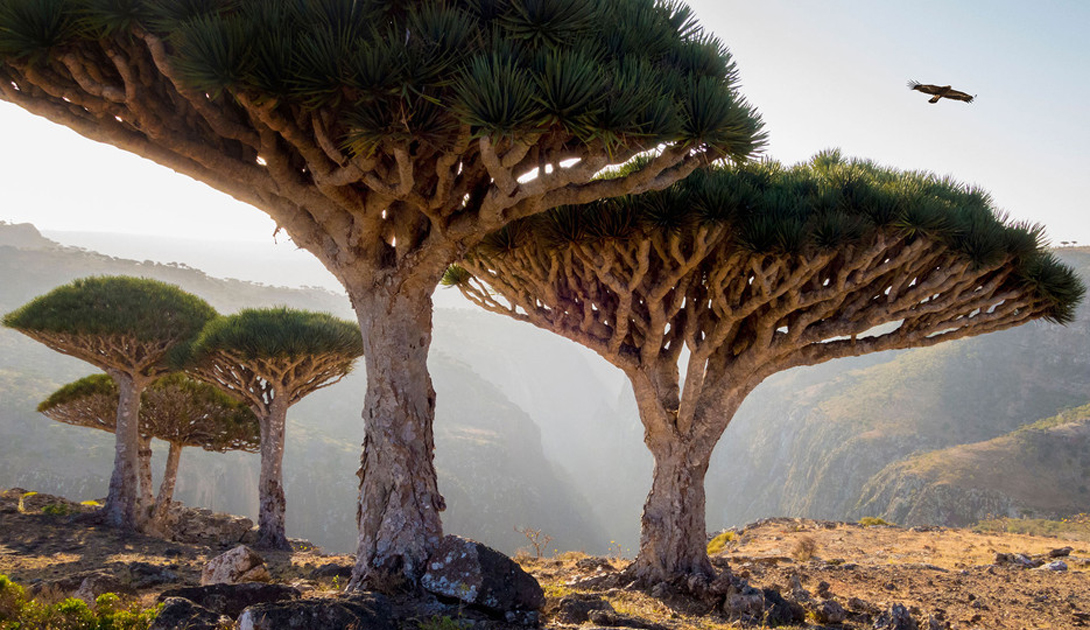
Dragon's blood tree (Dracaena cinnabari) in the Diksam Plateau

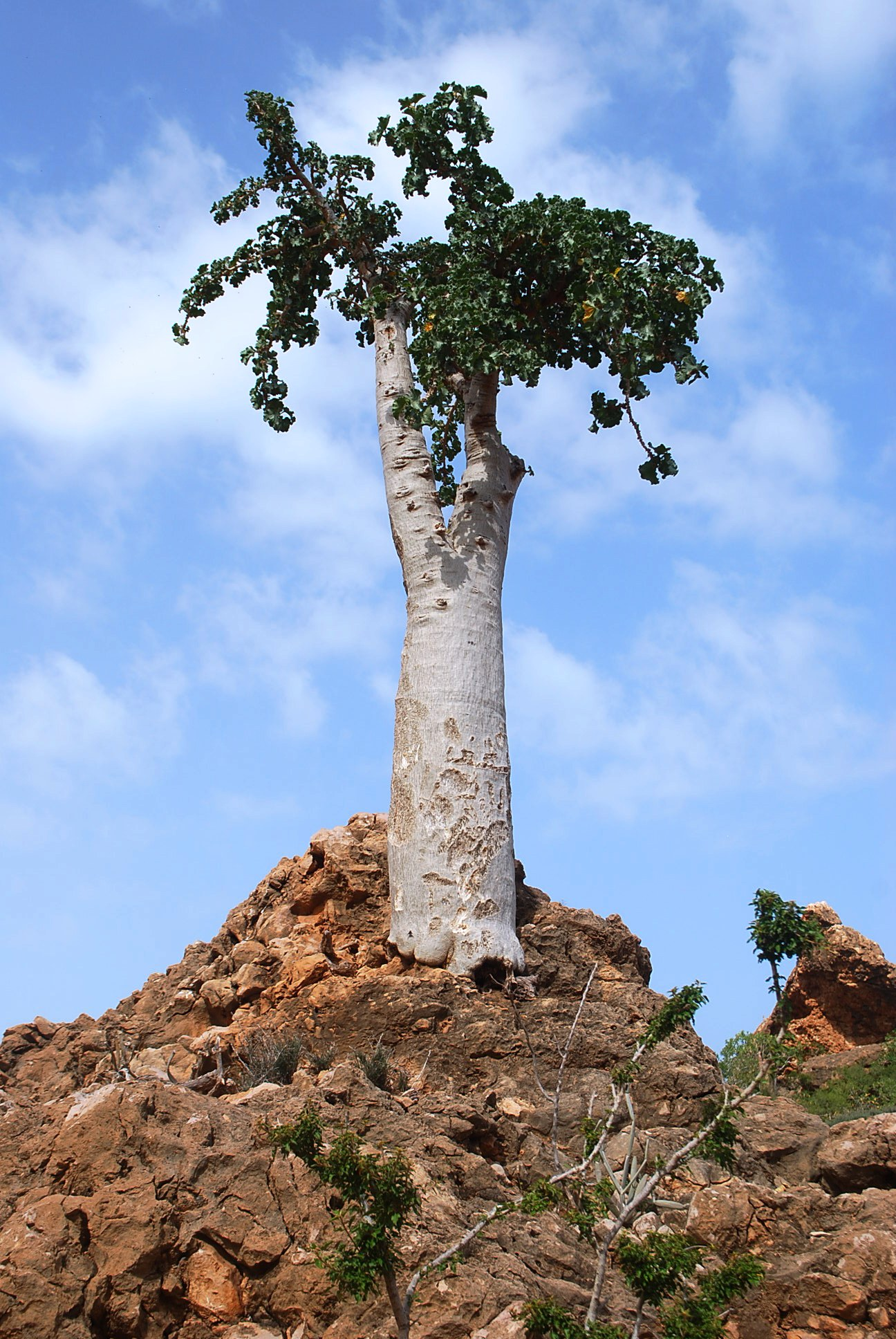
Dendrosicyos socotranus, the cucumber tree

Socotra is considered the jewel of biodiversity in the Arabian Sea. In the 1990s, a team of United Nations biologists conducted a survey of the archipelago's flora and fauna. They counted nearly 700 endemic species, found nowhere else on earth; only New Zealand, Hawaii, New Caledonia, and the Galápagos Islands have more impressive numbers.

The long geological isolation of the Socotra archipelago and its fierce heat and drought have combined to create a unique and spectacular endemic flora. Botanical field surveys led by the Centre for Middle Eastern Plants of the Royal Botanic Garden Edinburgh, indicate that 307 out of the 825 (37%) plant species on Socotra are endemic. The entire flora of the Socotra Archipelago has been assessed for the IUCN Red List, with three Critically Endangered and 27 Endangered plant species recognised in 2004.

One of the most striking of Socotra's plants is the dragon's blood tree (Dracaena cinnabari), which is a strange-looking, umbrella-shaped tree. Its red sap was thought to be the dragon's blood of the ancients, sought after as a dye, and today used as paint and varnish. Also important in ancient times were Socotra's various endemic aloes, used medicinally, and for cosmetics. Other endemic plants include the giant succulent tree (Dorstenia gigas), the cucumber tree (Dendrosicyos socotranus), the rare Socotran pomegranate (Punica protopunica), Aloe perryi, and Boswellia socotrana.

The island group has a rich fauna, including several endemic species of birds, such as the Socotra starling (Onychognathus frater), the Socotra sunbird (Nectarinia balfouri), Socotra bunting (Emberiza socotrana), Socotra cisticola (Cisticola haesitatus), Socotra sparrow (Passer insularis), Socotra golden-winged grosbeak (Rhynchostruthus socotranus), and a species in a monotypic genus, the Socotra warbler (Incana incana). Many of the bird species are endangered by predation by non-native feral cats. With only one endemic mammal, six endemic bird species and no amphibians, reptiles constitute the most relevant Socotran vertebrate fauna with 31 species. If one excludes the two recently introduced species, Hemidactylus robustus and Hemidactylus flaviviridis, all native species are endemic. There is a very high level of endemism at both species (29 of 31, 94%) and genus levels (5 of 12, 42%). At the species level, endemicity may be even higher, as phylogenetic studies have uncovered substantial hidden diversity. The reptile species include skinks, legless lizards, and one species of chameleon, Chamaeleo monachus. There are many endemic invertebrates, including several spiders (such as the Socotra Island Blue Baboon tarantula, Monocentropus balfouri) and three species of freshwater crabs in the Potamidae (Socotra pseudocardisoma and two species in Socotrapotamon).

The Socotran pipistrelle (Hypsugo lanzai) is the only species of bat, and mammal in general, thought to be endemic to the island. In contrast, the coral reefs of Socotra are diverse, with many endemic species. Socotra is also one of the homes of the brush-footed butterfly Bicyclus anynana.

Over the 2,000 years of human settlement on the islands, the environment has slowly but continuously changed, and, according to Jonathan Kingdon, "the animals and plants that remain represent a degraded fraction of what once existed." The Periplus of the Erythraean Sea states that the island had crocodiles and large lizards, and the present reptilian fauna appears to be greatly diminished since that time. Until a few centuries ago, there were rivers and wetlands on the island, greater stocks of the endemic trees, and abundant pasture. The Portuguese recorded the presence of water buffaloes in the early 17th century. Now there are sand gullies in place of rivers, and many native plants survive only where there is greater moisture or protection from roaming livestock. The remaining Socotran fauna is greatly threatened by goats and other introduced species.

=== UNESCO recognition ===
The island was recognised by the United Nations Educational, Scientific and Cultural Organization (UNESCO) as a world natural heritage site in July 2008. The European Union has supported such a move, calling on both UNESCO and the International Organisation of Protecting Environment to classify the island archipelago among the major environmental heritages.

== Administrative divisions ==
Governorates of Yemen

Previously, the archipelago pertained to the Hadhramaut Governorate. In 2013, however, the archipelago was removed from the Hadhramaut Governorate and the Socotra Governorate was created, consisting of the districts of:

- Hidaybu, with a population of 32,285 and a district seat at Hadibu, consisting of the eastern two-thirds of the main island of Socotra;
- Qalansiyah wa 'Abd-al-Kūrī, with a population of 10,557 and a district seat at Qulensya, consisting of the minor islands of the archipelago (the island of 'Abd-al-Kūrī chief among them) and the western third of the main island.

== Economy ==
The primary occupations of the people of Socotra have traditionally been fishing, bee keeping, animal husbandry, and the cultivation of dates. Some residents raise cattle and goats. The chief export products of the island are dates, ghee, tobacco, and fish.

Monsoons long made the archipelago inaccessible from June to September each year. In July 1999, however, a new airport opened Socotra to the outside world all year round. There was regular service to and from Aden and Sana'a until the start of the civil war in 2015. All scheduled commercial flights made a technical stop at Riyan-Mukalla Airport. Socotra Airport is located about 12 kilometres (7 1/2 miles) west of the main city, Hadibu, and close to the third-largest town in the archipelago, Qād̨ub. Diesel generators make electricity widely available in Socotra. A paved road runs along the north shore from Qalansiyah to Hadibu and then to the DiHamri area; and another paved road, from the northern coast to the south through the Diksam Plateau.

At the end of the 1990s, a United Nations Development Program was launched to provide a close survey of the island of Socotra. The project called Socotra Governance and Biodiversity Project have listed following goals from 2009:

- Local governance support
- Development and implementation of mainstreaming tools
- Strengthening non-governmental organizations' advocacy
- Direction of biodiversity conservation benefits to the local people
- Support to the fisheries sector and training of professionals

== See also ==
- List of islands of Yemen
