= Socotra (disambiguation) =

Socotra is an island in Yemen.

Socotra may also refer to:

- Socotra Governorate, governorate of Yemen that makes up the archipelago
- Socotra Rock, disputed rock in the Yellow Sea
- Socotra pseudocardisoma, a species of crab
