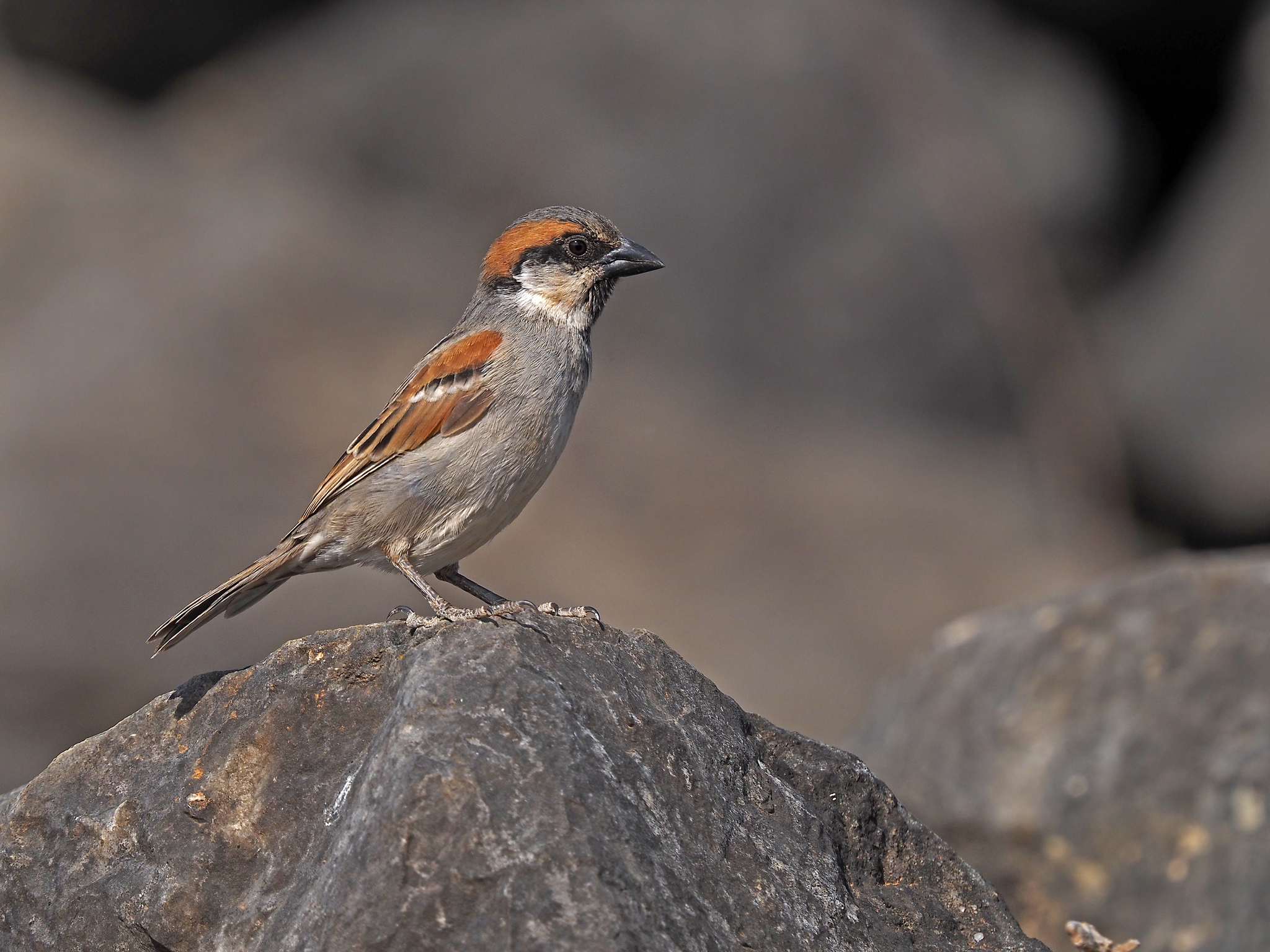
- on Socotra
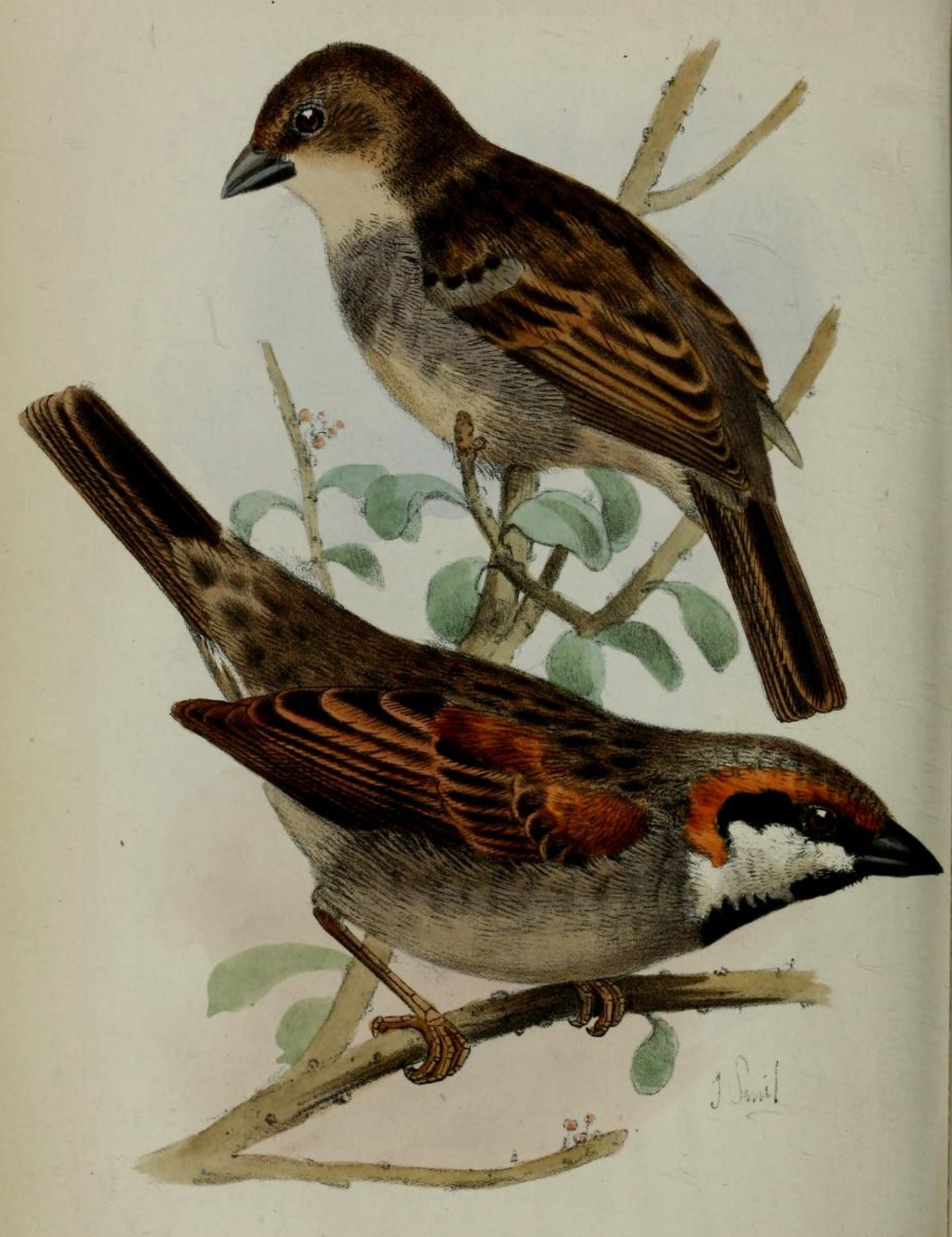
- Illustration

Conservation status
- Least Concern (IUCN 3.1)

Scientific classification
- Kingdom: Animalia
- Phylum: Chordata
- Class: Aves
- Order: Passeriformes
- Family: Passeridae
- Genus: Passer
- Species: P. insularis

Binomial name
- Passer insularis Sclater, PL & Hartlaub, 1881

= Socotra sparrow =

Species of bird

The Socotra sparrow (Passer insularis) is a passerine bird endemic to the islands of Socotra, Samhah, and Darsah in the Indian Ocean, off the Horn of Africa. The taxonomy of this species and its relatives is complex, with some authorities, including BirdLife International, recognising this species and the very similar Abd al-Kuri sparrow, as well as several from mainland Africa, as separate, and others lumping all these species and the probably unrelated Iago sparrow.
