= Gold-green Leaf =

"Gold-green Leaf" (Greek: Χρυσόπράσινο Φύλλο) was an unofficial national anthem for Cyprus.

== Background and release ==
In 1964, Mikis Theodorakis starred in an interview with the Cyprus Television, from which he promised to create a film entitled The Island of Aphrodite. The same year, the film was created, popularizing him within the country. A year later, the song was released by Malenis Leonidas as a songwriter and Theodorakis Mikis as composer. The song was released from the album Chrysoprasino fyllo.

== Etymology and lyrics ==
The songs name comes from the phrase "green-gold leaf cast upon the open sea" by the Greek Cypriot poet Leonidas Malenis. The phrase was said when settlers first came to Cyprus, describing it with the phrase. Other than the title phrase, other lyrics were presented, namely: "Land of the lemon and the olive tree, land of warm embraces, land of joy, land of the pine and the cypress tree, land of fine young men, land of love". The song was mostly dedicated to Aphrodite Island, which has a special species of oak from which one side is golden, and one side is green.
