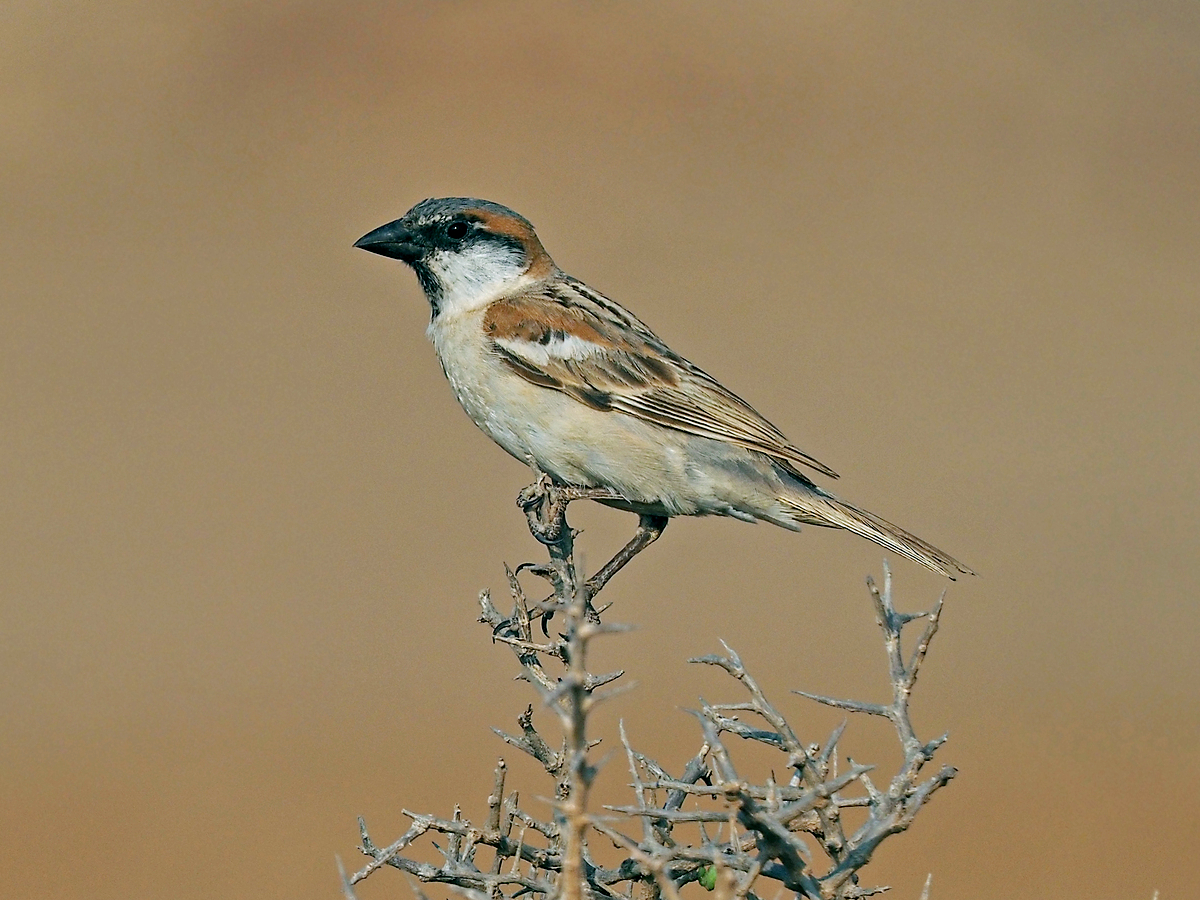

Conservation status
- Vulnerable (IUCN 3.1)

Scientific classification
- Kingdom: Animalia
- Phylum: Chordata
- Class: Aves
- Order: Passeriformes
- Family: Passeridae
- Genus: Passer
- Species: P. hemileucus

Binomial name
- Passer hemileucus Ogilvie-Grant & Forbes, 1899
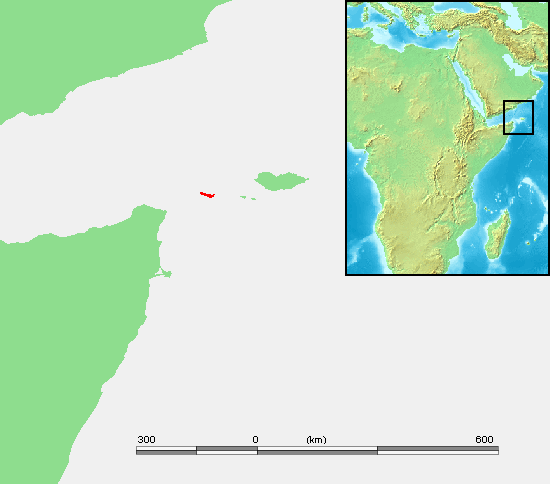
- Distribution

= Abd al-Kuri sparrow =

Species of bird

The Abd al-Kuri sparrow (Passer hemileucus) is a passerine bird endemic to the small island of Abd al Kuri. The sparrows are located primarily in the Socotra archipelago of the Indian Ocean, in Yemen, which is off the Horn of Africa. Their environment consists of shrubland and rocky areas with inland cliffs and mountain peaks. Though this species was originally described as a distinct species, it was considered conspecific with the Socotra sparrow. The sparrow is also referred to by its English name, Abd al-Kuri, or its Dutch, Middle Name, Abd al-Kuri Mus. A study by Guy Kirwan suggested that there are differences between the Abd al-Kuri sparrow and the Socotra sparrow. On the evidence that it is morphologically distinct, BirdLife International (and hence the IUCN Red List) recognised it as a species, and it was listed in the IOC World Bird List from December 2009. It has a restricted distribution, and a population of under 1,000 individuals.

== Taxonomy ==
The sparrow is in the Kingdom Animalia, Phylum Chordata, Class Aves, Order Passeriformes, Family Passeridae, and Genus Passer. The sparrow's scientific name is Passer hemileucus. The common English name is the Abd al-Kuri sparrow, and the Dutch middle name is the Abd al-Kuri Mus.

== Description ==
The male sparrow is brown and gray and has a streak on its back. It is 13-14cm tall, with a chestnut brown eyebrow arch downward curve behind its ears, and a black stripe curving around the back of its ears. The female is smaller than the male and is pale brown with dark brown underparts. The female, compared to the male, is smaller in size.

== Habitat and Distribution ==
The Abd al Kuri is endemic to its small island of Abd al Kuri, which is located in the Socotra Archipelago, Yemen. It prefers dry, rocky areas. Its habitat is found on scrub-covered slopes or gullies on the island. The Abd al Kuri has a recorded range from sea level up to the island's higher points.

== Threats ==
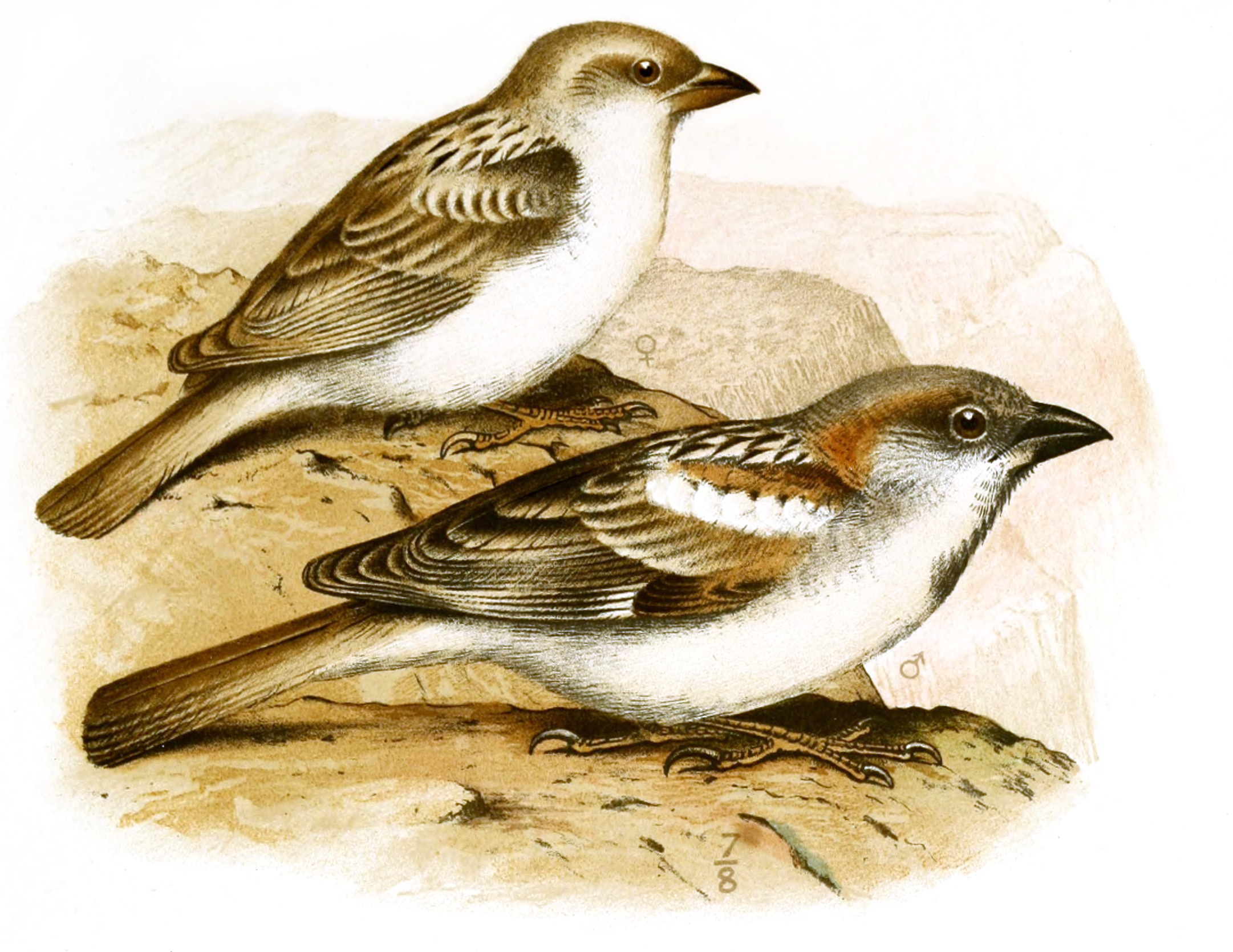
Female (Above) and Male (Below) illustrated by Henrik Grønvold

The Abd al-Kuri sparrow is threatened by locals who are hunting them for food; it is also subject to natural disasters such as cyclones. Due to the sparrows' small population size, hunting, largely in the Autumn season, is a major threat to this species. There are only four passerines breeding on the island of Abd al-Kuri, so harvesting causes significant impacts on the sparrows' population.

== Conservation Status and Measures ==
The Abd al-Kuri sparrow was listed as vulnerable by the IUCN Red List due to its restricted distribution and small population. This is due to its small population of under 1,000 individuals, threats such as being hunted by locals, and natural disasters like cyclones. There are invasive species such as rats and cats, but they are not a threat to the island. Researchers plan to initiate education, awareness, research, and monitoring schemes to preserve the sparrows' population.

== Trend Justification ==
The sparrow population was previously stable with minimal threats, but now it is experiencing a decline in population after natural disasters like cyclones and hunting for food. A continuing decline in the current population would result in reassessment at a higher Red List category.
