= List of islands of Yemen =

Islands of Yemen

This is a list of islands of Yemen.

Image	Archipelago/group	Island	Name	Area km²	Area (square miles)	Population
	Socotra Archipelago		Socotra	3,796	1,466	60,000
	Socotra Archipelago		Abd al Kuri	133	51	450
	Socotra Archipelago		Samhah	40	15	100
	Socotra Archipelago		Darsah	7.5	2.89	0
	Socotra Archipelago		North Ka'l Fir'awn	0.17	0.06	0
	Socotra Archipelago		South Ka'l Fir'awn	0.12	0.04	0
	Socotra Archipelago		Sabuniyah	0.05	0.01	0
	Hanish Islands		Jabal Zuqar	120	46.2	0
	Hanish Islands		Greater Hanish	65	25.1	0
	Hanish Islands		Lesser Hanish	9	3.4	0
	Hanish Islands		Al Mamalih	3.16	1.2	0
	Zubair Group		Zubair Island	14	5.4	0
	Zubair Group		Jabal Al-Tair	11.48	4.43	0
	N/A		Kamaran	108	41.7	2,200
	Bab al-Mandab Strait		Perim	13	5.01	221

== See also ==
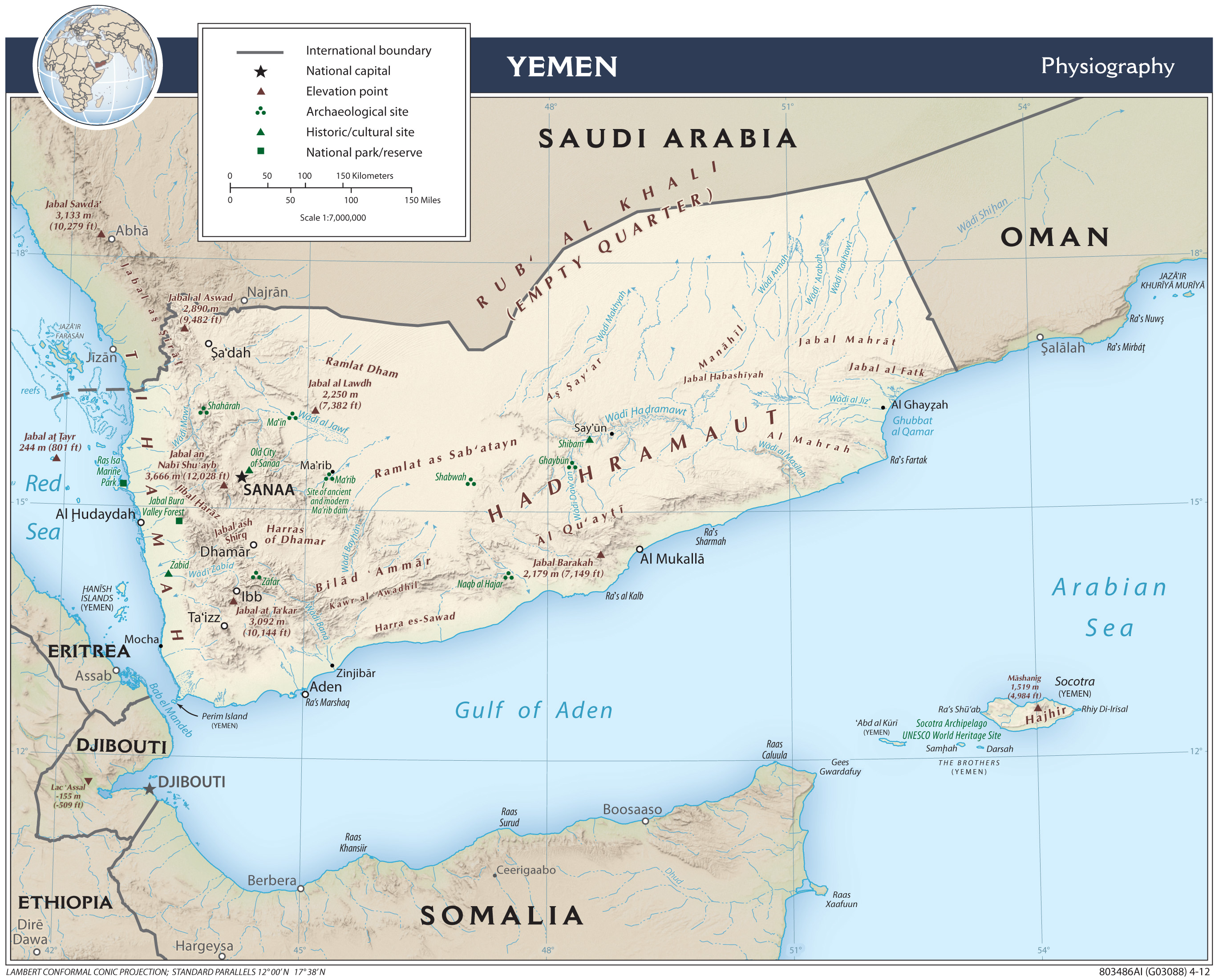
Yemen map

- List of islands
- List of islands in the Red Sea
- Geography of Yemen
