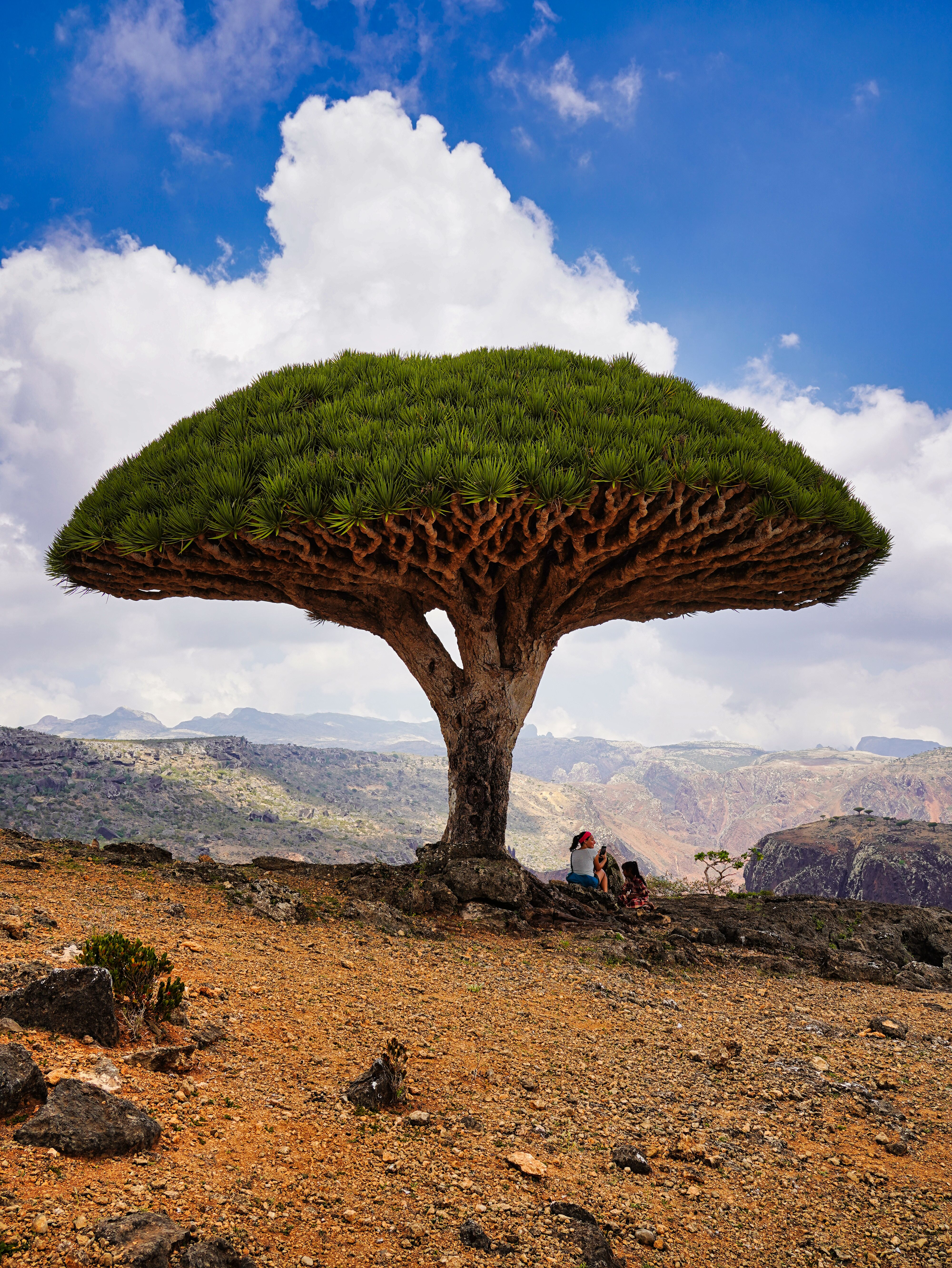
- A specimen at Diksam Plateau

Conservation status
- Vulnerable (IUCN 3.1)

Scientific classification
- Kingdom: Plantae
- Clade: Tracheophytes
- Clade: Angiosperms
- Clade: Monocots
- Order: Asparagales
- Family: Asparagaceae
- Subfamily: Convallarioideae
- Genus: Dracaena
- Species: D. cinnabari

Binomial name
- Dracaena cinnabari Balf.f.
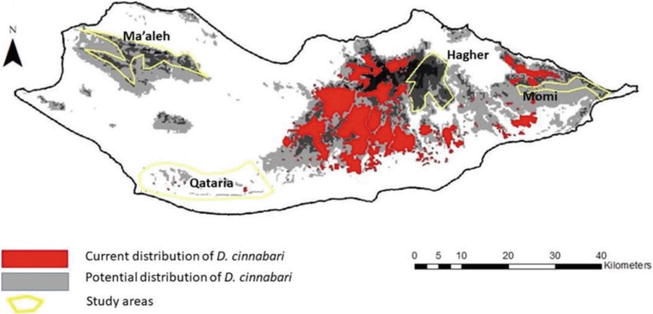
- Distribution of D. cinnabari in Socotra

= Dracaena cinnabari =

Species of plant

Dracaena cinnabari, the Socotra dragon tree, or dragon blood tree, is a dragon tree native to the Socotra archipelago, part of Yemen, located in the Arabian Sea. It is named after the blood-like color of the red sap that the trees produce. It is also the national tree of Yemen.

== Description ==
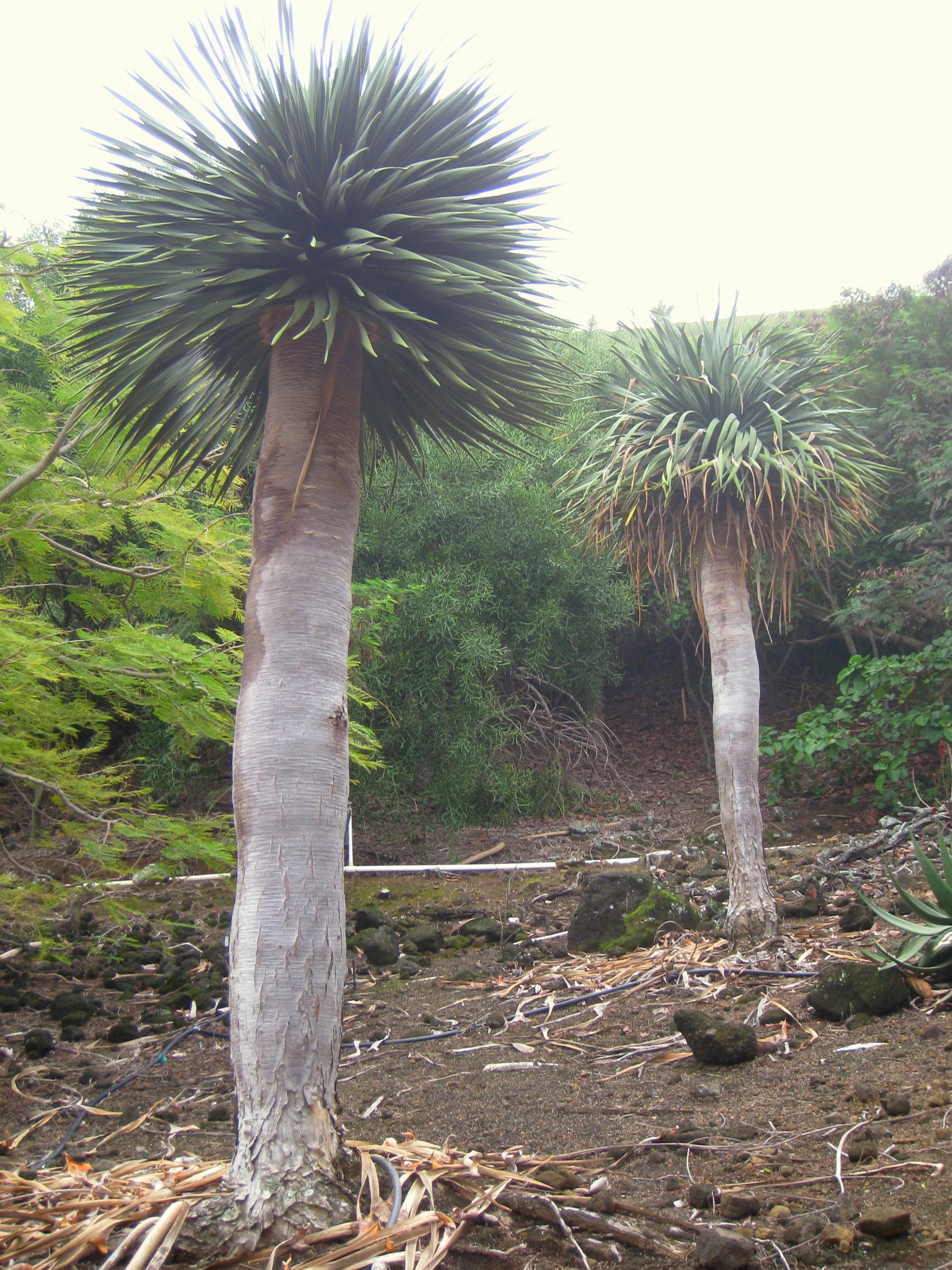
Young specimen of Dracaena cinnabari in the Koko Crater Botanical Garden, Honolulu, Hawaii, United States

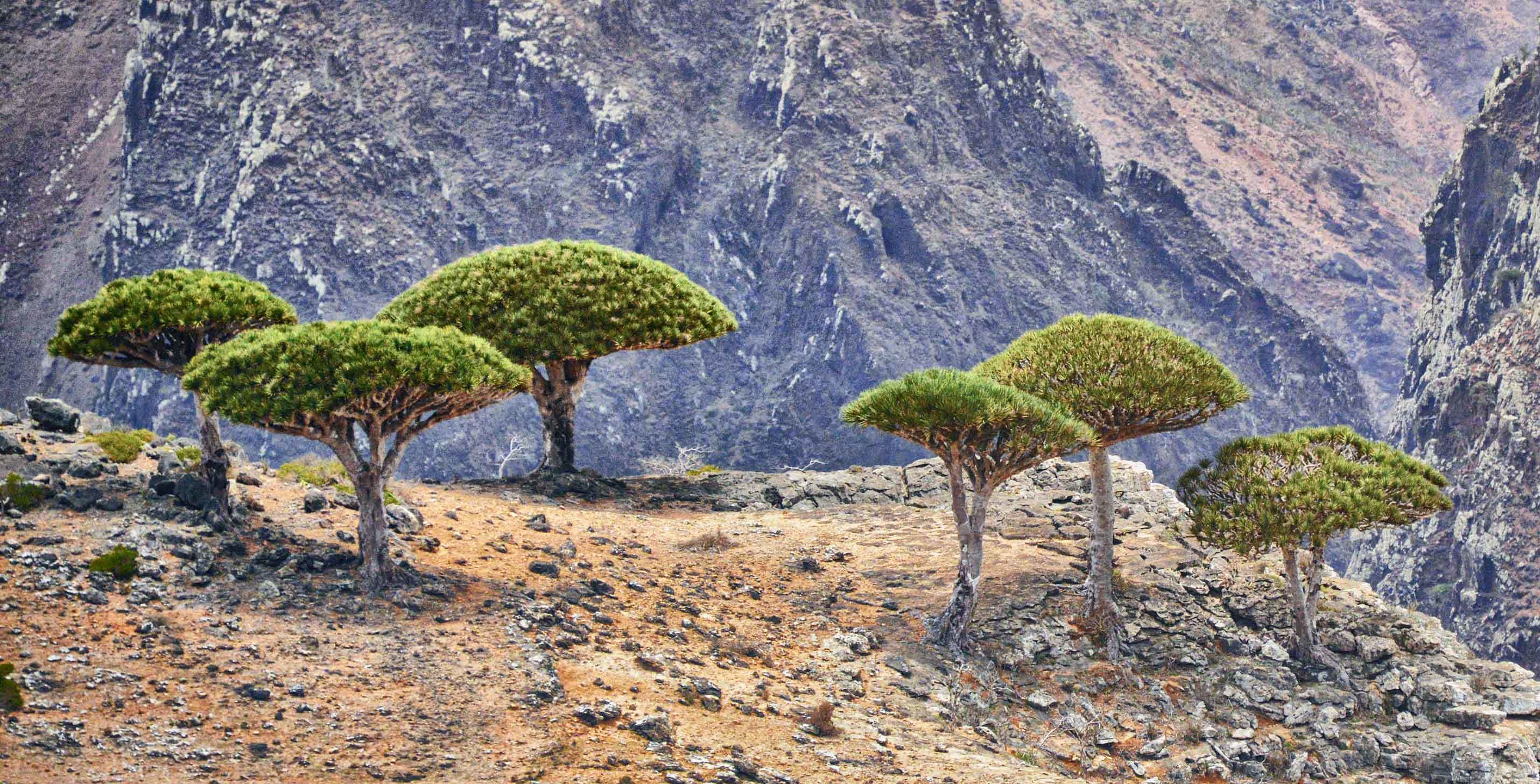
Dragon trees at the edge of the gorge in Socotra

The dragon blood tree has an upturned, densely packed, umbrella-shaped crown. This evergreen species is named after its dark red resin, which is known as "dragon's blood". Unlike most monocot plants, Dracaena displays secondary growth; D. cinnabari even has growth zones resembling tree rings found in dicot tree species. Along with other arborescent Dracaena species it has a distinctive growth habit called "dracoid habitus". Its leaves are found only at the ends of its youngest branches and are shed every three or four years as new leaves simultaneously mature. Branching tends to occur when the growth of the terminal bud is stopped, through either flowering or traumatic events (e.g. herbivory). The tree measures up to 9 m (30 ft) in height and 12 m (39 ft) across the crown, and the trunk reaches up to 1.5 m (4 ft 11 in) DBH.

The fruits of D. cinnabari are small fleshy berries containing between one and four seeds. As they develop they turn from green to black, and then become orange when ripe. The berries are eaten by birds (e.g. Onychognatus species) and thereby dispersed. The seeds are 4–5 mm (0.16–0.20 in) in diameter and weigh on average 68 mg. The berries exude a deep red resin colloquially known as dragon's blood.

Like other monocotyledons such as palms, the dragon's blood tree grows from the tip of the stem, with the long, stiff leaves borne in dense rosettes at the end. It branches at maturity to produce an umbrella-shaped crown, with leaves that measure up to 60 cm (24 in) long and 3 cm (1.2 in) wide. The trunk and branches of D. cinnabari are thick and stout and display dichotomous branching, where each of the branches repeatedly divides into two sections.

=== Biology ===
The dragon's blood tree usually produces its flowers around March, though flowering does vary with location. The flowers tend to grow at the end of the branches. The plants have inflorescences and bear small clusters of fragrant, white, or green flowers. The fruits take five months to completely mature. The fruits are described as a fleshy berry, which changes from green to black as it gradually ripens. The fleshy berry fruit ends up being an orange-red color that contains one to three seeds. The berries are usually eaten and dispersed by birds and other animals.

The tree's umbrella-shaped crown is adapted to arid conditions and is influenced by atmospheric moisture. Its leaves are scleromorphic, helping to prevent excessive water loss.

The dragon's blood tree's distinctive umbrella shape is made possible by its unusual growth pattern. Unlike most monocots, Dracaena cinnabari undergoes secondary growth—a rare ability that allows its trunk to thicken over time. While its stem develops growth ring-like zones, these do not reliably indicate age since they form from irregular vascular bundle patterns rather than seasonal growth cycles.

This growth mechanism differs significantly from dicot trees. Instead of forming continuous growth rings, D. cinnabari produces scattered vascular strands in its secondary tissue. This unique structure provides the necessary support for its broad crown while being efficient in its harsh, resource-limited environment. The evolutionary adaptation from primary to secondary vascular tissues demonstrates how this monocot developed its tree-like form, combining water conservation through its dense crown with structural stability from its specialized stem growth. These features collectively enable the species to thrive in challenging high-altitude, arid conditions where few other trees can survive.

== Taxonomy ==
The first scientific description of D. cinnabari was made during a survey of Socotra led by Lieutenant Wellsted of the East India Company in 1835. It was first named Pterocarpus draco, but in 1880 the Scottish botanist Isaac Bayley Balfour made a formal description of the species and renamed it as Dracaena cinnabari. Of between 60 and 100 Dracaena species, D. cinnabari is one of only six species that grow as a tree.

Along with other plants on Socotra, D. cinnabari is thought to have derived from the Tethyan flora. It is considered a remnant of the Mio-Pliocene Laurasian subtropical forests that are now almost extinct because of the extensive desertification of North Africa.

== Conservation ==
=== Threats ===
A map of the Socotra (Soqotra) archipelago

Although most of its ecological habitats are still intact, there is an increasing population with industrial and tourism development. This is putting more pressure on the vegetation through the process of logging, overgrazing, woodcutting and infrastructure of development plans. Though the tree is widespread, it has become fragmented with the development that has occurred in its habitats. Many of its populations are suffering poor regeneration. Human activities have greatly reduced the population through overgrazing, and feeding the flowers and fruits to the livestock of the island. One of the greatest threats is the gradual drying out of the Socotra Archipelago, which has been an ongoing process for the last few hundred years. This has resulted in non-flourishing trees, and the duration of the mist and cloud around the area seems to also be decreasing. Increasingly arid environments are predicted to cause a 45 percent reduction in the available habitat for D. cinnabari by 2080. Another threat comes from goat grazing in the area, which prevents regeneration and prevents seedlings developing in locations other than rocky outcrops.

Additional threats include harvesting of its resin and use of its leaves as fodder during the dry season. Presently some trees have been used to make beehives. This was generally prohibited; this displays how the species may be threatened by a breakdown in the traditional practices of the island.

The best preserved and largest stand of D. cinnabari is on the limestone plateau named Rokeb di Firmihin. This approximately 540 hectares (1,300 acres) forest has numerous rare and endemic species. Research shows that in coming decades the number of trees in this forest will decrease due to the lack of natural regeneration.

=== Management ===
The flora and fauna of the Socotra Archipelago are in a World Heritage Site and a Global 200 ecoregion. The archipelago is a Centre of Plant Diversity and an Endemic Bird Area. Socotra also lies within the Horn of Africa biodiversity hotspot. There are multiple efforts that are being developed to help create and support a sustainable habitat and biodiversity management programs on Socotra. The dragon's blood tree is considered as an important species for commodity and for conservation efforts on the island. The dragon's blood falls under an umbrella species. This is a species selected for making conservation related decisions, typically because protecting these species indirectly protects the many other species that make up the ecological community of its habitat. Species conservation can be subjective because it is difficult to determine the status of many species. Thus, the dragons blood protection efforts would also benefit many other plants and animals within the area.

The tree is given some protection from international commercial trade under the listing of all Dracaena species on Appendix II of CITES (3), but if its populations are to be effectively preserved, a variety of measures will need to be taken. These include urgent monitoring of the species' natural regeneration and the expansion of Skund Nature Sanctuary to cover important areas of the habitats. Also, efforts to avoid road construction in the dragon blood's habitat, and limit grazing need to be brought to attention. Additional conservation efforts for the tree involve fencing against livestock, watering of seedlings in open areas, and involving local communities in planting seedlings.

By the 21st century threats arising from global warming and overgrazing have made it difficult for new trees to grow in wild. A collaboration of local people with assistance from others such as UK-based Friends of Socotra and Mendel University in Brno has been aiding a number of slow growing saplings by watering them while they are too young to draw down sufficient water, and protecting them from hungry goats. As of 2022, about 600 saplings have reached the point where they no longer need regular watering, leading to hopes that a new generation of the tree may become established on Socotra.

== Uses ==
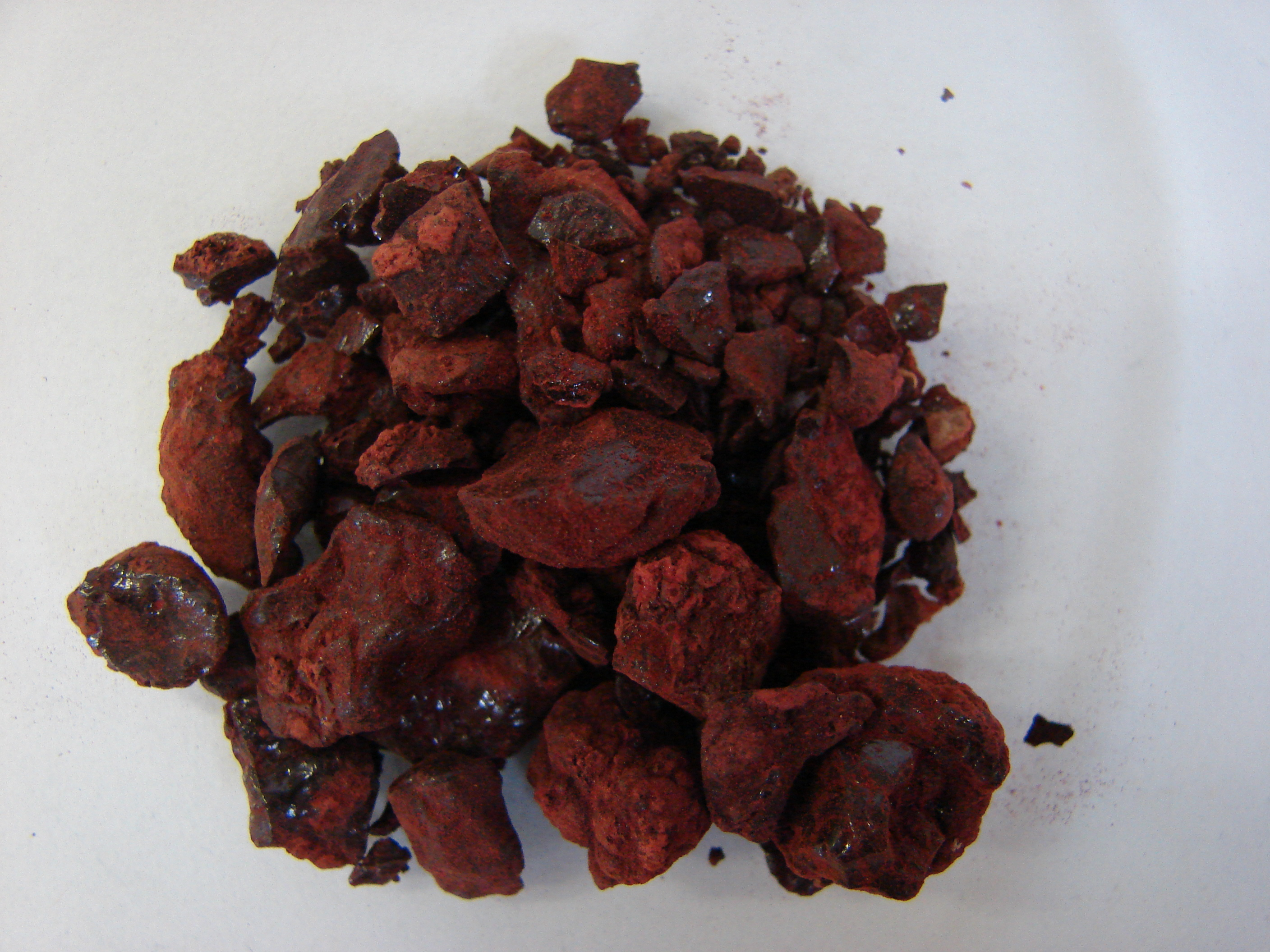
Dragon's blood from the Dracaena cinnabari

The trees can be harvested for their crimson red resin, called dragon's blood, which was highly prized in the ancient world and is still used today. Around the Mediterranean basin it is used as a dye and as a medicine, Socotrans use it ornamentally as well as dyeing wool, gluing pottery, a breath freshener, and lipstick. The root yields a gum-resin, used in gargle water as a stimulant, astringent and in toothpaste. The root is used in rheumatism, the leaves are a carminative.

In 1883, the Scottish botanist Isaac Bayley Balfour identified three grades of resin: the most valuable were tear-like in appearance, then a mixture of small chips and fragments, with a mixture of fragments and debris being the cheapest. The resin of D. cinnabari is thought to have been the original source of dragon's blood until during the medieval and renaissance periods when other plants were used instead. Because of the belief that it is the blood of the dragon it is also used in ritual magic and alchemy.

The local inhabitants of the city in the Socotra Island used the dragon's blood resin as a cure-all. Greeks, Romans, and Arabs used it in general wound healing, as a coagulant, cure for diarrhea, for dysentery diseases, for lowering fevers. It was also taken for ulcers in the mouth, throat, intestines and stomach.

Dragon's blood from D. cinnabari was used as a source of varnish for 18th-century Italian violin-makers. It was also used as tooth-paste in the 18th century. It is still used as varnish for violins and for photoengraving. Dragon's blood is also listed in a 16th-century text, Von Stahel und Eysen, as an ingredient in a quenching bath for tempering steel.

== See also ==
- National symbols of Yemen
- Dracaena draco

== Sources ==
- Attorre, F., Francesconi, F., Taleb, N., Scholte, P., Saed, A., Alfo, M. and Bruno, F. (September 2007). "Will Dragonblood Survive the Next Period of Climate Change? Current and Future Potential Distribution of Dracaena Cinnabari (Socotra, Yemen)". Biological Conservation 138(3–4): 430–439. doi:10.1016/j.biocon.2007.05.009.
- Eggli, U., ed. (2001). Illustrated Handbook of Succulent Plants: Monocotyledons. Berlin: Springer-Verlag. ISBN 9783540416920. OCLC 9783540416920.
- Gupta, D., Bleakley, B. and Gupta, R.K. (2008). "Dragon's Blood: Botany, Chemistry and Therapeutic Uses". Journal of Ethnopharmacology 115(3): 361–380. doi:10.1016/j.jep.2007.10.018. PMID 18060708.
- Heywood, V.H. (1978). Flowering Plants of the World [First ed.]. Oxford: Oxford University Press. ISBN 1280817194. OCLC 840292274.
- Pearson, J. (Spring 2002). "Dragons Blood". The Horticulturalist, 11(2): 10–12. JSTOR 45139217.
