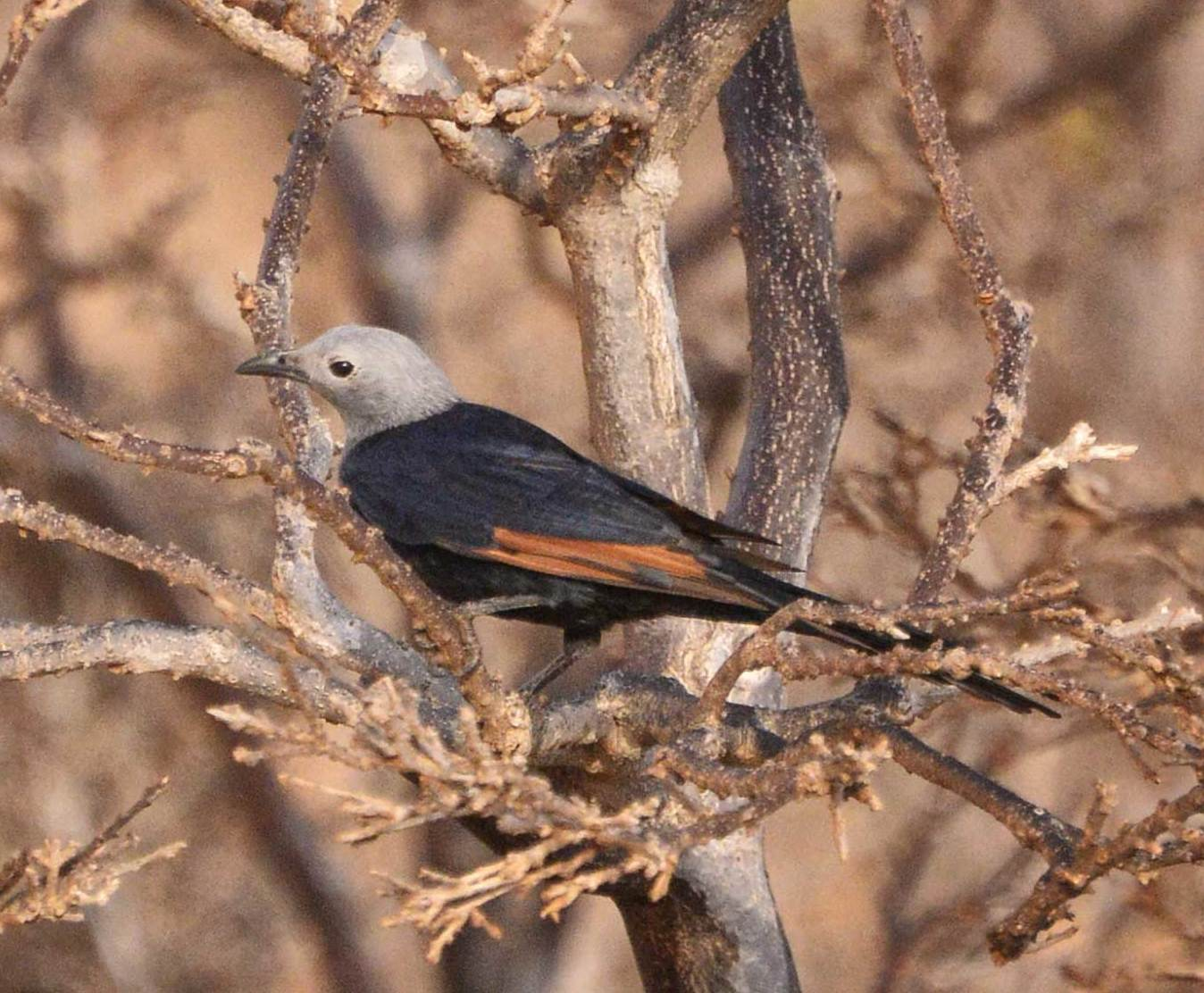

Conservation status
- Least Concern (IUCN 3.1)

Scientific classification
- Kingdom: Animalia
- Phylum: Chordata
- Class: Aves
- Order: Passeriformes
- Family: Sturnidae
- Genus: Onychognathus
- Species: O. frater

Binomial name
- Onychognathus frater (PL Sclater & Hartlaub, 1881)

= Socotra starling =

Species of bird

The Socotra starling (Onychognathus frater) is a species of starling in the family Sturnidae. It is endemic to Socotra island, which is off the southeast coast of Yemen.

Its natural habitats are subtropical or tropical dry forest, subtropical or tropical moist lowland forest, subtropical or tropical dry shrubland, subtropical or tropical high-altitude shrubland, and rural gardens.

The Socotra starling builds its nests in the hollow branches of Socotra's dragon blood tree (Dracaena cinnabari). In addition to feeding on grasshoppers and figs, the bird also eats the berries of the dragon blood tree and helps disperse the tree's seeds.
