= Zubair Group =

Group of major volcanic islands in the Red Sea

- Location within Yemen

Highest point
- Elevation: 191 m (627 ft)
- Coordinates: 15°3′0″N 42°10′0″E

Geography
- Location: Yemen, Red Sea

Geology
- Mountain type: Shield Volcano
- Last eruption: September - October 2013

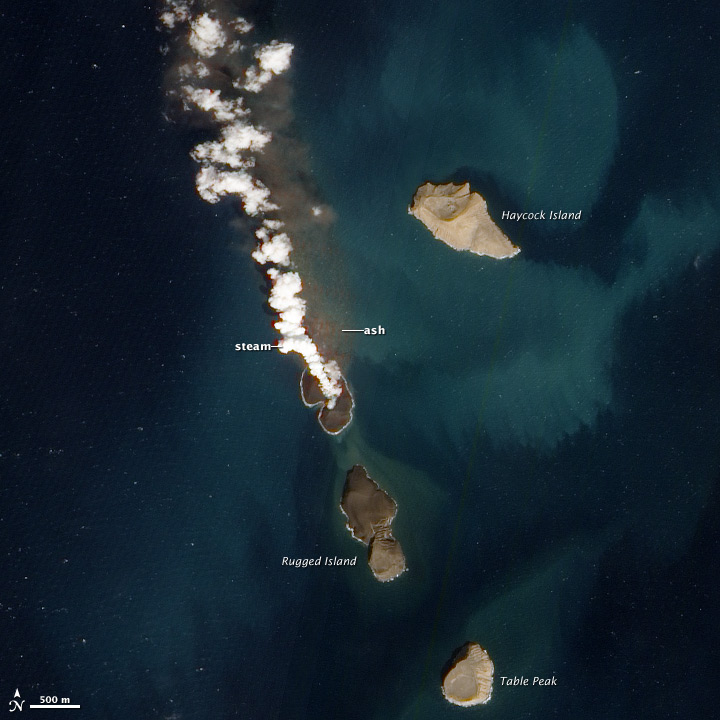
New island forming in the Zubair Group, about 0.5 km (0.3 mi) NNW of Rugged Island. NASA satellite image, January 7, 2012.

Zubair Group, Al Zubair Group or Zubayr Group (Arabic: مجموعة جزر الزبير, or simply: جزر الزبير) is a group of 10 major volcanic islands, on top of an underlying shield volcano in the Red Sea, which reach a height of 191 metres (627 feet) above sea level. The volcano has continued to erupt in historic times. The islands belong to Yemen.

== Islands ==
The largest island is Zubair, which is one of the younger islands. Other young islands are Center Peak, Saba, Haycock, and Saddle. Saddle Island has had eruptions in historic times.

The volcano was built on a NNW-SSE rift line. It began with a period of explosive eruptions, then a period of quiescence followed, during which time marine erosion took place. This was followed by a period of both explosive and effusive eruption activity, building up the Stark and Barren group of islands that exist today. This period of eruption has continued into historic times.

== Historic eruptions ==
=== 1824 eruption ===
A small (VEI 2) eruption took place in 1824 on Saddle Island, with low level explosive activity. An eruption may have taken place on August 14, 1846, but this event is uncertain.

=== 2011–2012 eruption ===
A volcanic eruption took place 19 December 2011 from the seabed. Satellite images showed a plume in the sea between Haycock and Rugged Islands. Fishermen reported lava fountaining 30 m above the sea. The submarine eruption has built a new island in the group, in between Rugged and Haycock Islands. Water entering the vent had created Surtseyan activity resulting in the release of steam and an ash plume.

As of 12 January 2012, the new island had grown to around 530 by 710 meters (1,740 by 2,330 ft) across and had begun effusive activity, It was named Sholan Island.

Satellite images taken on 15 January 2012 showed that the eruption had stopped, leaving a newborn island behind. A satellite photo taken on February 15 shows the new island has a crater lake.

=== 2013 eruption ===
On September 28, 2013, a new submarine eruption began southwest of the 2011–2012 eruption site, with water discoloration and a significant steam plume reported. Scientists estimated that the eruption was taking place less than 100 m below the surface, meaning that a new surtseyan phase was a possibility. The activity at the site continued into October, with a large steam plume visible on satellite and confirmed by video from locals. In late October, a new island emerged from the ocean.

This island has been named Jadid Island while the one created in 2011 has been named Sholan Island. By the summer of 2016 neither island was visible on satellite photos.

== Visitor attractions ==
Diving, sightseeing, wildlife viewing and volcano trekking are popular activities for tourists and visitors. The islands are uninhabited.

== See also ==
- List of islands of Yemen
