= Samhah =

Island in Yemen

Native name: سمحة
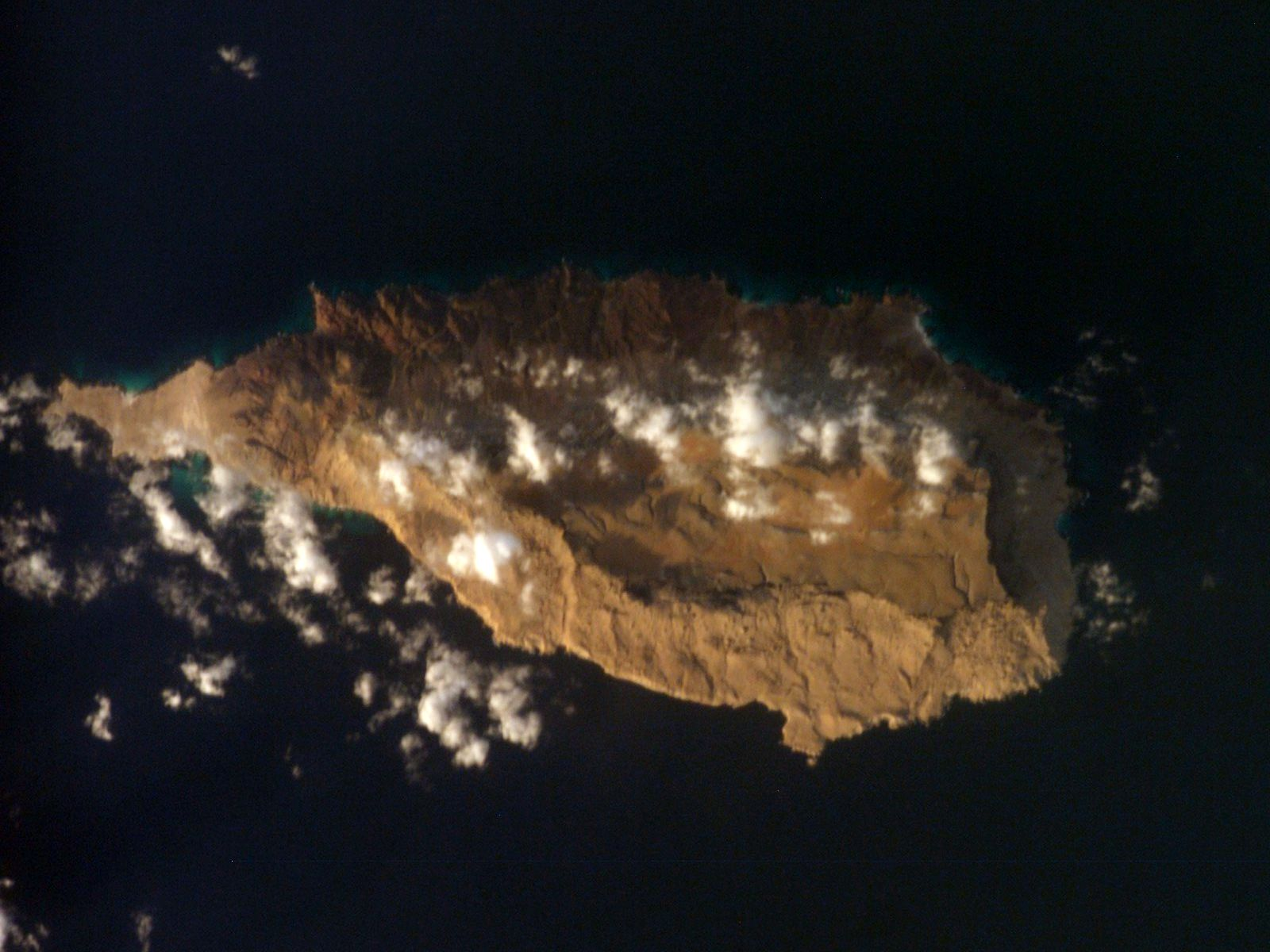
- Photograph by NASA astronauts

- Map of the Socotra archipelago; Samha at center left

Geography
- Location: Guardafui Channel
- Coordinates: 12°09′N 53°03′E
- Archipelago: Socotra Archipelago
- Area: 40 km^{2} (15 sq mi)
- Length: 12 km (7.5 mi)
- Width: 6.8 km (4.23 mi)

Administration
- Yemen
- Governorate: Socotra Governorate

Demographics
- Population: 100

Samhah (Arabic: سمحة; alt. Samha) is an inhabited island in the Guardafui Channel. A part of the Socotra Archipelago of Yemen, it is located between the island of Socotra and Abd al Kuri.

== Statistics ==
It measures 40 square kilometres (15 square miles) in area, making it the smallest of the three inhabited islands of the group, after the main island of Socotra and Abd al Kuri. The population of some 100 lives in a village on the western part of the north coast. Samhah and neighboring Darsah (17 km (11 mi) to the east) are collectively known as "Al Akhawain" (Arabic: الأخوين), which means "the two brothers". The island of Samhah measures 12 kilometres (7 miles) in length and 6.8 kilometres (4.2 miles) in width.

== Important Bird Area ==
The island of Samhah (along with neighbouring Darsah) has been recognised as an Important Bird Area (IBA) by BirdLife International, as it supports a breeding population of Jouanin's petrel (Bulweria fallax).

== See also ==
- List of islands of Yemen
- Darsah
- Socotra archipelago
