= Darsah =

Island in Yemen

Native name: جزيرة درسة
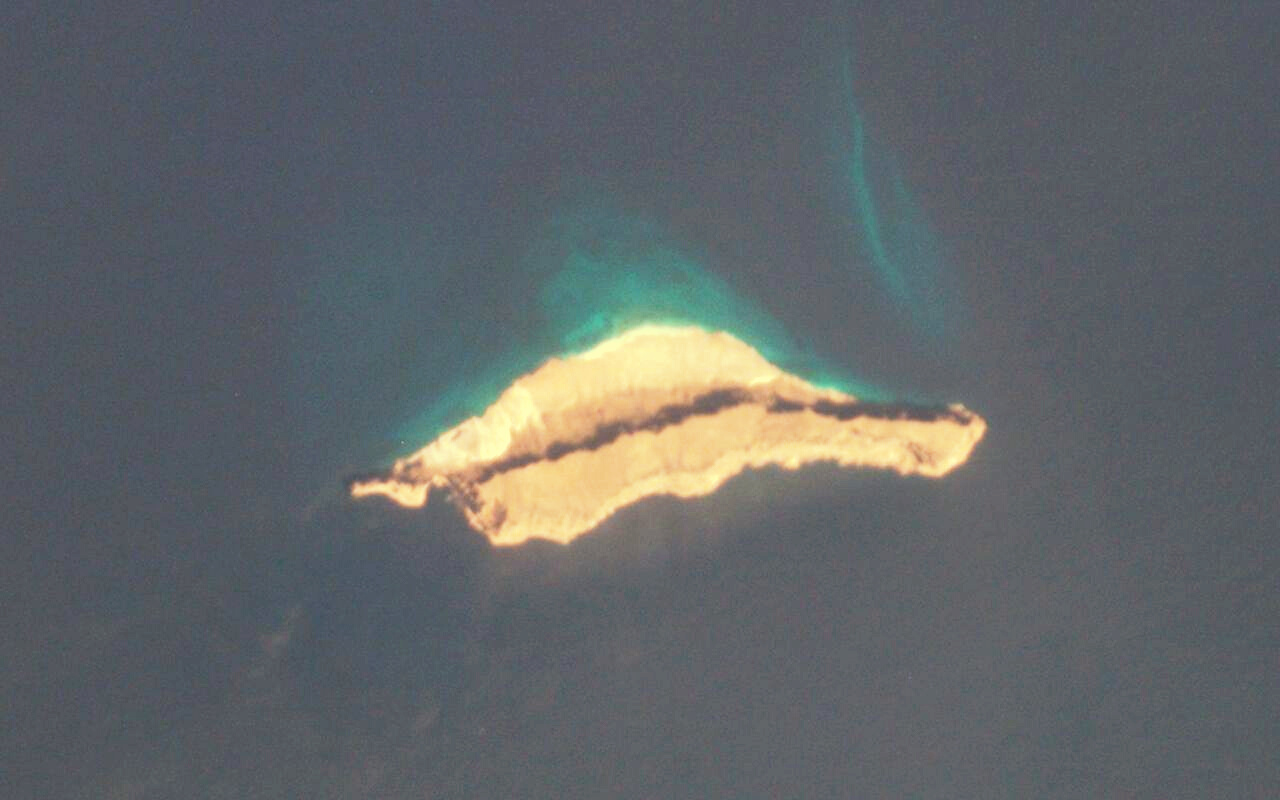
- Photograph by NASA astronauts
- Interactive map of Darsah

Geography
- Coordinates: 12°07′15″N 53°16′30″E
- Archipelago: Socotra Archipelago
- Area: 5.412 km^{2} (2.090 sq mi)
- Length: 7.12 km (4.424 mi)
- Width: 2.25 km (1.398 mi)

Administration
- Yemen
- Governorate: Socotra Governorate

Demographics
- Population: uninhabited

Darsah (Arabic: درسة) is an uninhabited island in the Guardafui Channel. It is part of the Socotra Archipelago of Yemen. Darsah and neighboring Samhah (17 km (11 mi) to the west) are collectively known as "Al Akhawain" (Arabic: الأخوين) which means "The Brothers".

== Important Bird Area ==
The island has been recognised as an Important Bird Area (IBA) by BirdLife International because it supports breeding colonies of red-billed tropicbirds and brown boobies.

Map of the Socotra archipelago; Darsah at lower center

== See also ==
- List of islands of Yemen
- Samhah
