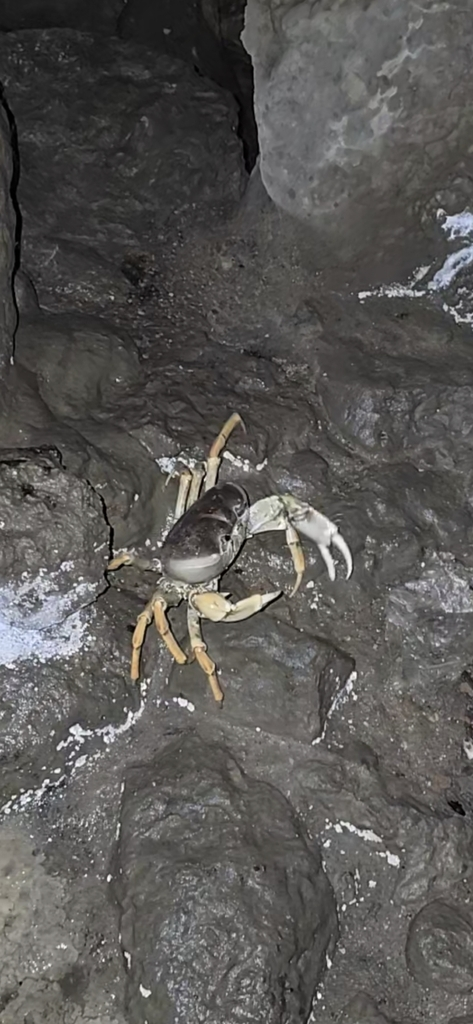
- In a rocky cave

Conservation status
- Endangered (IUCN 3.1)

Scientific classification
- Kingdom: Animalia
- Phylum: Arthropoda
- Clade: Pancrustacea
- Class: Malacostraca
- Order: Decapoda
- Suborder: Pleocyemata
- Infraorder: Brachyura
- Family: Potamidae
- Subfamily: Potaminae
- Genus: Socotra; Cumberlidge & Wranik, 2002
- Species: S. pseudocardisoma

Binomial name
- Socotra pseudocardisoma Cumberlidge & Wranik, 2002

= Socotra pseudocardisoma =

Species of terrestrial freshwater crab

Socotra pseudocardisoma (known colloquially as the Socotra karst crab) is a limestone dwelling species of terrestrial freshwater crab endemic to Socotra Island of Yemen. It is distinguishable from some other species of freshwater crabs by the lightly colored border that partially circles the darkly colored dome of its carapace. It belongs to the family Potamidae and is the only species in the genus Socotra. This species is marked as endangered and largely depleted according to the IUCN red list. This was last assessed in 2024. The species was first observed by scientists Neil Cumberlidge and Wolfgang Wranik in 1997, and was named the Socotra karst crab due to the karstic environment in which it lives.

== Appearance ==
S. pseudocardisoma has a dark carapace with a lightly colored margin. Males often have a purplish-black carapace bordered by a light brown margin, while females have a dark brown carapace with a light yellow margin. The facial area of the crab is small, with a three segmented mandibular palp. The legs are an earthy light yellowish orange, with a darker gradation around the articulations of the leg segments. The coloration of the crab is reminiscent of the shadows and highlights of a limestone outcrop. S. pseudocardisoma has been observed to have a carapace width of 26-27 millimeters as a juvenile, and a carapace width of 77.2-90.5 millimeters observed in adult specimens.

== Habitat and behavior ==
S. pseudocardisoma resides in holes, crevices and caves that occur in limestone outcrops of inland semi-arid uplands of Socotra Island in Yemen, particularly in the Diksam Plateau. Streams and pools can temporarily occur within the crevices and other features of the limestone, which are a likely water source for S. pseudocardisoma. It is speculated that while S. pseudocardisoma is found at elevations of 700 meters above sea level, it may be accessing water reserves that potentially exist deeper within the limestone. S. pseudocardisoma has not been observed above ground during the drier months between April and October. During rainier months, the crab emerges to forage for food above ground after sundown. Their preferred prey includes small reptiles, insects and native scolopendra, however in captivity they have been observed consuming both plant and animal tissue, suggesting that this species is omnivorous.

== Reproduction ==
Mating between members of S. pseudocardisoma has been observed in captivity. The male and female in this instance remained in the mating position for about a day. It is assumed that the sperm from the male gonopods is stored in the spermatheca of the female and used later on when eggs are deposited, which in the case of S. pseudocardisoma, has been observed to happen during the wetter months of the year.

== Threats ==
Population numbers of S. pseudocardisoma are thought to be decreasing, though the exact number of individuals currently alive is not known. S. pseudocardisoma has been observed in multiple locations at or above 700 m on the island of Socotra, however human developments, such as housing and livestock farms, and roads have contributed increasingly to habitat destruction and fragmentation. It is dangerous for individuals to cross roads to connect with other subpopulations, limiting dispersal. The species has also historically faced the threat of being hunted for food.
