= Diksam Plateau =

Plateau in Socotra, Yemen

Diksam Plateau دِكْسَم (Arabic)
- Plateau
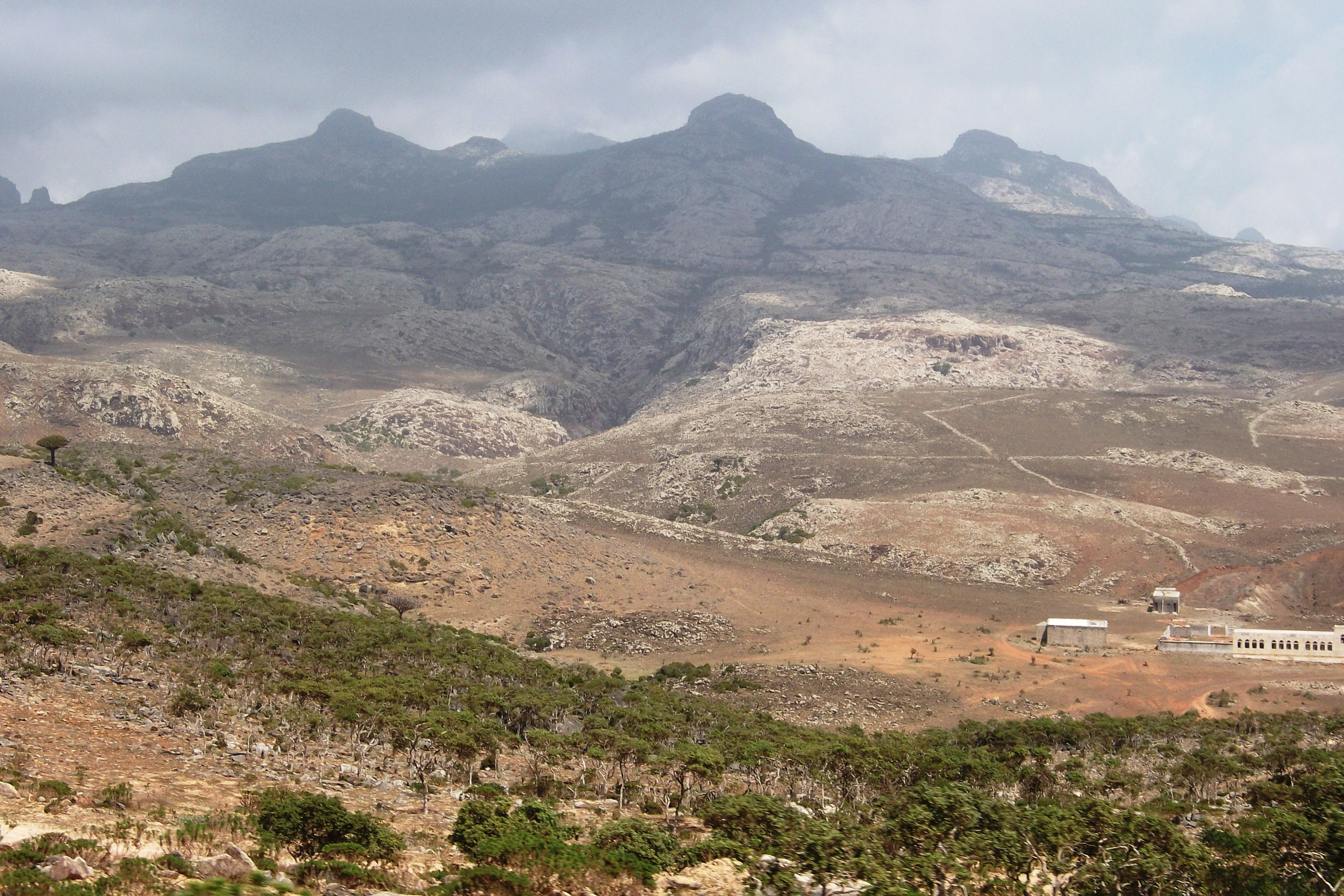

- Coordinates: 12°28′1″N 54°0′4″E
- Location: Socotra
- Part of: Yemen
- Elevation: 700 meters (2,300 ft)

The Diksam Plateau or Dixam Plateau (Arabic: دِكْسَم) is a limestone plateau in Socotra, Yemen. The Firmihin forest, located east of the Dirhur canyon within the plateau, has the highest concentration of Dragon's Blood Trees on the entire island.

== Description ==
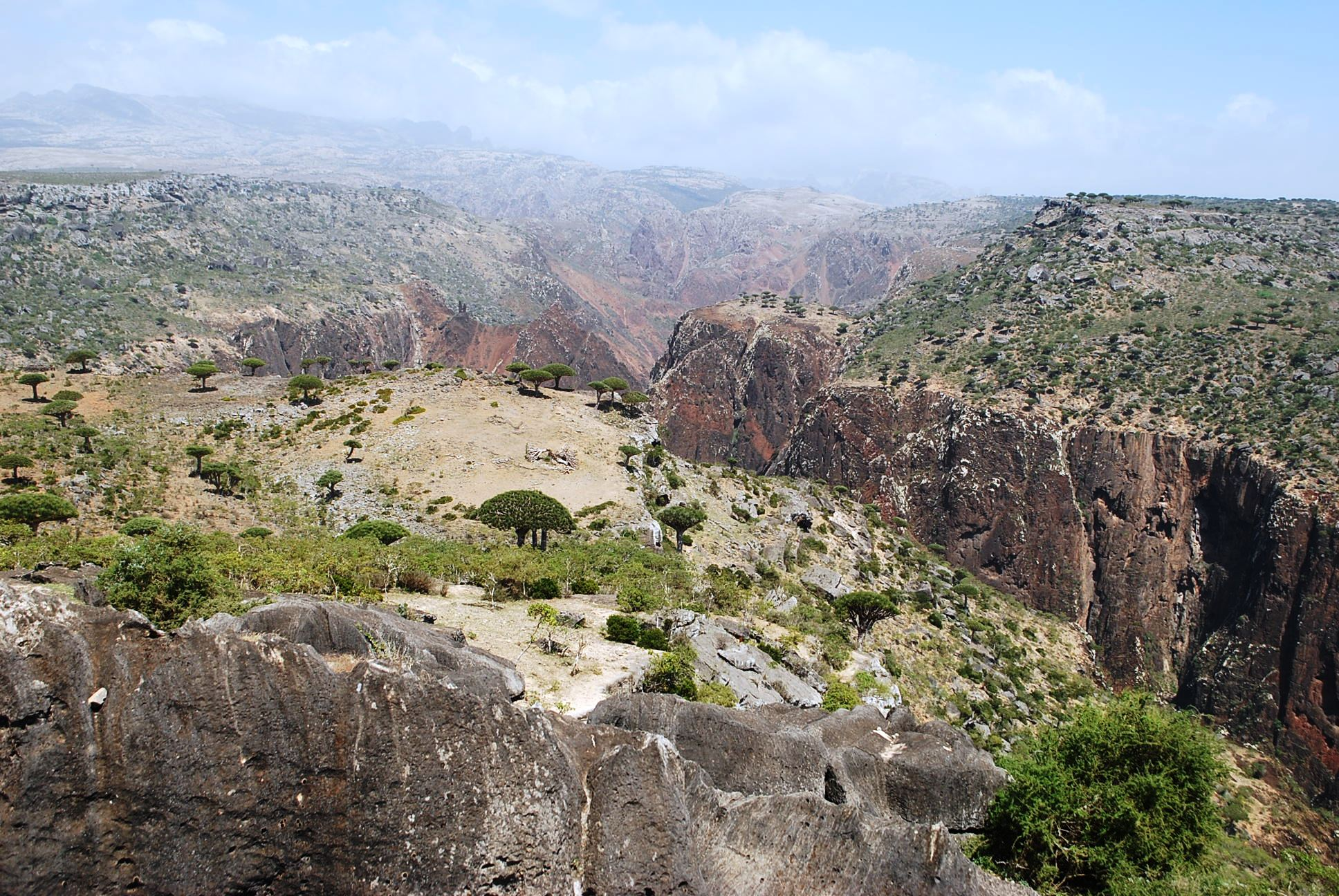
Plateau with canyon

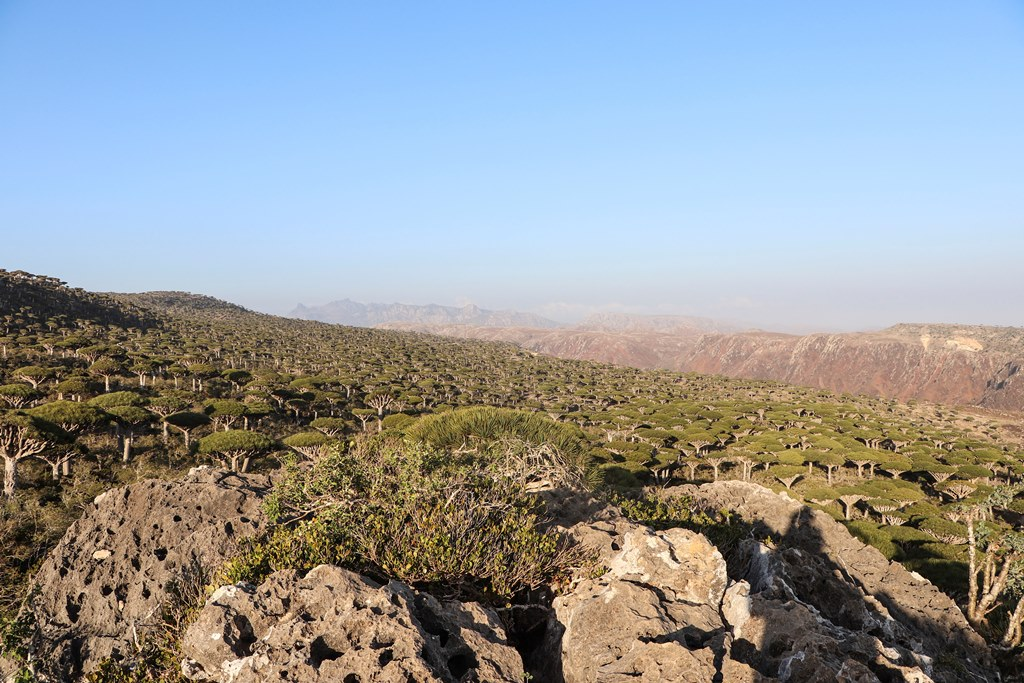
Firmihin forest

The Diksam Plateau is an extensive area located near the geographic center of Socotra between the Hajhir Mountains and the southern coastal plain. Situated about 700 m above sea level, the plateau is home to herdsmen, named Bedouin, who move from one site to another with their herds. They live in a high number of tiny villages scattered across the plateau, reflecting extensive pastoralism, on which their inhabitants are dependent.

Wadi Dirhu or Daerh is a north–south running gorge dropping 700 m vertically from the plateau to the valley floor. The wadi is home of large stands of Adenium obesum and Dendrosicyos socotranus.

The largest and most extensive population of Dragon's Blood Trees of Socotra is shaping the landscape character of Rokeb di Firmihin in the east of the plateau. The spot covers an area of 540 ha exposed to the southwestern monsoon and rains. The population suffers from regeneration and is therefore considered an endangered species.

== See also ==
- Geography of Socotra
