= Port of Mokha =

Port in Yemen

Port of Mocha
- Interactive map of Port of Mocha
- Location within Yemen

Location
- Country: Yemen
- Location: Mocha
- Coordinates: 13.3167°N 43.2333°E

Details
- Operated by: Yemen Red Sea Ports Corporation

Statistics
- Website https://portofmokha.com/

The Port of Mokha is among the ancient and key ports of Yemen on the Red Sea. It's located in Mocha city, about 100 km west of Taiz and is 75 km away from Bab al-Mandeb Strait at the Red Sea coast. The port is located at a latitude 13/19º to the north of the equator and at a longitude 04/43º east of the Greenwich meridian.

== History ==
The port of Mocha rose to prominence in 1538, after the Ottoman conquest of Yemen, when it became an important Ottoman harbour and a key maritime foothold on the southern Red Sea. Its strategic position near the Bab al-Mandab Strait enabled it to serve as a centre for maritime communications and trade between the Red Sea, the Indian Ocean, and the Arabian Peninsula.

After the Ottoman forces withdrew from Yemen in 1636, the port continued to operate under the Qasimid imams, whose rule encouraged its commercial connections with the Indian Ocean and India's western coast. During the 17th century, Mocha developed into a major regional entrepôt, receiving ships and merchants from the Arabian Peninsula, India, and other parts of the Indian Ocean. Its maritime trade included Yemeni coffee, Indian textiles, spices, aromatics, medicinal products, metals, and other imported commodities.

Map of the port of Mocha, 1737.

The port became particularly important in the international coffee trade, serving as the principal maritime outlet for coffee transported from the Yemeni highlands to overseas markets. During the 18th century, it functioned as a major redistribution centre for goods destined for southwestern Arabia, the Red Sea coast of Africa, and the wider Indian Ocean region. Merchants from the Indian port of Surat played a prominent role in importing textiles, foodstuffs, metals, and European manufactured goods, which were subsequently re-exported to ports including Jeddah, Massawa, and Berbera.

European commercial establishments also operated at the port. The English East India Company and the Dutch East India Company obtained permission to establish trading factories there during the seventeenth century, while the eighteenth century witnessed the presence of established English, Dutch, and French commercial interests. These companies participated in the purchase and export of Yemeni coffee and other regional commodities, as well as in the import and distribution of Asian and European goods.

During the late 17th and first half of the 18th century, the area was the most prominent port in Yemen, particularly known for its export of the Mocha coffee bean. However, the expansion of coffee cultivation outside Yemen, particularly in the Dutch East Indies and the Caribbean, gradually weakened the port's position in the international coffee trade. Its decline was further accelerated during the 19th century by the growing importance of competing ports, particularly the Port of Aden and Hodeidah Port, and by political and commercial disruptions affecting the southern Red Sea. Following the Ottoman reoccupation of Yemen in the 1870s, Mocha briefly regained some administrative attention but never recovered its former position as a major regional trading port. The modern port was established in 1955.

Following the construction of a 200-metre pier in the 1950s, the port experienced severe silting, which had almost completely obstructed the berth area by 1975. Cargo throughput fell to approximately 50,000 tonnes in 1976, prompting dredging works that were completed in 1977. A reconstruction programme continued through November 1978, during which cargo traffic was diverted to the Port of Hodeidah. The improvements included two berths with a depth of 7.8 metres, in addition to the existing pier for smaller vessels and facilities for unloading oil. The port subsequently handled frozen goods, oil and construction materials, and also received cargo diverted from Hodeidah during periods of congestion in 1980 and 1981. A slipway for repairing small vessels was completed in February 1982.

During the Yemeni Civil War, the port sustained severe damage to its critical infrastructure and became inoperable. After rehabilitation works, it reopened for commercial shipping on 30 July 2021, initially receiving small merchant vessels and humanitarian cargo, although it lacked facilities for handling oil derivatives. On 11 September 2021, shortly before the planned resumption of food imports, the port was attacked by Houthi missiles and explosive-laden drones, which damaged port infrastructure and destroyed warehouses containing food and humanitarian supplies.

In August 2026, during the renewed SPC-PLC clashes, the port was struck by more than 25 missiles in Houthi attacks, according to its director, who reported seven fatalities and estimated losses of US$16 million. The attacks led to the suspension of commercial and maritime operations. On 10 September, the Houthis seized the city of Mocha, including its port, before Yemeni government forces announced on 5 October that they had retaken it. Reuters reported that it could not independently verify the extent of the government forces' advances.

== Port facilities ==
The modern port facilities at Mocha were constructed in 1955 and consisted of a 200-metre-long concrete pier connected to the shore by a 160-metre causeway and an access road crossing a sandy spit. The pier was originally designed to accommodate barges and small vessels, while larger ships anchored approximately 2–3 km offshore and transferred their cargo to the shore using lighters and barges.

The port suffered from severe silting caused by coastal sediment transport, which progressively reduced the depth alongside the pier. By June 1975, the usable quay had been reduced to approximately 30 metres, with a depth of about 2 metres, and cargo handling continued primarily through lighterage. A rehabilitation programme was subsequently undertaken, comprising the construction of a 750-metre breakwater, dredging of an approximately 2-kilometre access channel and turning basin, and the strengthening and enlargement of the existing pier. The programme also included improvements to the port's navigational facilities.

According to the Yemen Red Sea Ports Corporation, the port's listed facilities include two berths with a combined length of 430 metres and a width of 35 metres, with reported depths ranging from 4.5 to 8.4 metres. Other facilities include a 726-metre rock breakwater, an offshore platform for petroleum tankers, four covered warehouses with a total storage area of 12,000 square metres, and open storage yards covering 53,000 square metres. The port is also equipped with two mobile cranes, each with a lifting capacity of 20 tonnes, a pilot and tugboat, a power station, firefighting equipment, and a livestock quarantine facility.

The corporation also lists a 2-kilometre-long approach channel, 110 metres in width, and a turning basin measuring 412 metres in diameter and 8 metres in depth. Pilotage is compulsory from the main entrance to the port.

== See also ==
- Mokha
- Yemen Red Sea Ports Corporation
- Yemen Gulf of Aden Ports Corporation
- Yemen Arabian Sea Ports Corporation
