= Port of Salif =

Port of Al-Salif
- Interactive map of Port of Al-Salif
- Location within Yemen

Location
- Country: Yemen
- Location: Hudaydah Governorate
- Coordinates: 15.2833°N 42.6833°E

Details
- Operated by: Yemen Red Sea Ports Corporation

The Port of Al-Salif is a commercial seaport on the Red Sea in As-Salif, Hudaydah Governorate, western Yemen. It is a natural deep-water port and one of the country's principal facilities for handling dry bulk cargo. The port specializes in importing grain, particularly wheat, and exporting bulk salt from the nearby deposits on the Salif Peninsula. Its facilities include a deep-water berth, grain-handling equipment, and storage silos.

== Location ==
The Port of Al-Salif is located at 15.2833°N, 42.6833°E, approximately 75 km north of Hudaydah. It is a natural deep-water harbour, with depths exceeding 15 metres close to shore, and is sheltered by the nearby Kamaran Island. Its natural depth allows it to accommodate large bulk carriers, making it suitable for the handling of dry bulk commodities.

== History ==
The port's development was closely linked to the exploitation of the rock-salt deposits on the Salif Peninsula. During the early 1970s, salt was an important Yemeni export, accounting for approximately one-sixth of the country's recorded commodity exports in 1970–71, with Japan as its principal market. However, exports subsequently declined and disappeared from the export list, mainly because of production and marketing difficulties experienced by the Salif Salt Corporation. In 1975, Japan stopped importing Yemeni salt over concerns about impurities, while the Soviet Union agreed to purchase salt from Yemen the following year.

A dedicated salt-loading facility was completed in 1976 with financial assistance from the Kuwait Fund for Arab Economic Development. Its pier was designed to accommodate bulk carriers of up to 50,000 deadweight tonnes and was connected to the nearby salt mines by conveyor belts. At the time of the World Bank's 1977 appraisal, salt shipments through the facility had not yet begun, although export negotiations were under way. The port was also used on a limited basis for general cargo, particularly when congestion at Hudaydah caused delays for ships waiting to berth. Its deep-water access made it suitable for large bulk carriers, although its distance from the country's main consumption centres and limited cargo-handling equipment restricted its role as a general cargo port.

In the 1980s, the port continued to serve as a facility for bulk cargo and salt-related activities. The Yemen Salt Mining Corporation owned and managed the salt-loading pier, while the Ports and Marine Affairs Corporation was responsible for the operation of other ports and for any general cargo facilities developed at Salif. The port's role in the national maritime network remained focused on bulk commodities rather than container traffic.

During the Yemeni Civil War, the port came under Houthi control along with the other principal ports in Hudaydah Governorate. The Stockholm Agreement, reached on 13 December 2018, included the ports of Hudaydah, Salif and Ras Isa. It provided for an immediate ceasefire, the redeployment of forces, the removal of military manifestations, demining, and a strengthened United Nations role in port management and inspections. On 12 May 2019, the United Nations announced that the first phase of the redeployment of Houthi forces from the three ports had begun, with the Coast Guard taking over security responsibilities at the port facilities.

On 21 March 2021, two explosive ordnance dropped from an aircraft struck a warehouse and another building belonging to the Yemeni International Company for Food Production at the port, injuring six workers. The United Nations Panel of Experts on Yemen reported that the remnants were consistent with guided bombs used by the Saudi-led coalition. The Panel stated that the buildings were used for civilian purposes and that the available information suggested that the principles of distinction and proportionality had probably not been respected. It also noted that allegations of Houthi military activities at the port, including the manufacture of naval mines, had not been conclusively established.

On 19 December 2024, Israeli airstrikes targeted the ports of Hudaydah and Salif, as well as the Ras Isa oil terminal and energy infrastructure in Sanaa. The Houthi-run Al-Masirah television reported that seven people were killed in the strike on Salif, while the Israeli military said that it had attacked Houthi military targets, including port facilities. The strikes formed part of the escalation between Israel and the Houthis following Houthi missile and drone attacks against Israel and attacks on commercial shipping in the Red Sea.

The port was struck again during Israeli air raids on 16 May 2025, when the Israeli military announced that it had targeted infrastructure at the Houthi-controlled ports of Hudaydah and Salif. Further Israeli airstrikes on 6 July targeted Salif, Hudaydah and Ras Isa. Satellite imagery published after the July strikes showed damage to the docks at Salif, and maritime tracking data reported by Lloyd's List indicated that no vessels had arrived at or departed from the port after the attacks through 13 July. The strikes disrupted the operation of the Red Sea ports and affected the flow of commercial goods into Houthi-controlled areas.

In October 2025, FEWS NET reported that Al-Salif specialized in dry bulk cargo, particularly grain imports and bulk salt exports, and that the airstrikes on the ports of Hudaydah Governorate had caused substantial damage to port infrastructure and reduced import capacity. On 25 July 2026, the Saudi-led coalition stated that Al-Salif, along with the ports of Hudaydah and Ras Isa, remained open to maritime navigation and was receiving commercial vessels carrying food, commodities and construction materials.

== Facilities ==
The port's facilities were initially developed to serve the salt industry on the Salif Peninsula. A salt-loading pier, completed in 1976 with financial assistance from the Kuwait Fund for Arab Economic Development, was designed to accommodate vessels of up to 50,000 deadweight tonnes. Conveyor belts connected the pier to nearby salt mines. The port subsequently developed facilities for handling imported bulk commodities, particularly grain.

The port includes a grain-storage terminal equipped with ten flat-bottom silos, installed as part of a project completed in 2020. The silos have a reported combined storage capacity of 280,000 tonnes, comprising nine units of 30,000 tonnes and one of 10,000 tonnes. The installation also includes grain-handling conveyors and automated control systems for wheat storage and processing.

== Operations ==
Al-Salif primarily handles dry bulk cargo, particularly imported grain and exported salt. It is an important entry point for wheat supplies to Yemen, alongside the nearby Port of Hudaydah. The port is also used for the import of other bulk commodities, including construction materials. Unlike the Port of Ras Isa, which contains facilities for receiving petroleum products, Al-Salif is principally a dry bulk port.

The port has served humanitarian food shipments. On 17 April 2023, a vessel chartered by the World Food Programme arrived at Al-Salif carrying 30,000 metric tonnes of wheat grain from the Ukrainian port of Chornomorsk, as part of efforts to support food assistance in Yemen.

== See also ==
- Yemen Red Sea Ports Corporation
- Yemen Gulf of Aden Ports Corporation
- Yemen Arabian Sea Ports Corporation
- Hudaydah Port
