= Port of Mukalla =

Seaport in Mukalla, Yemen

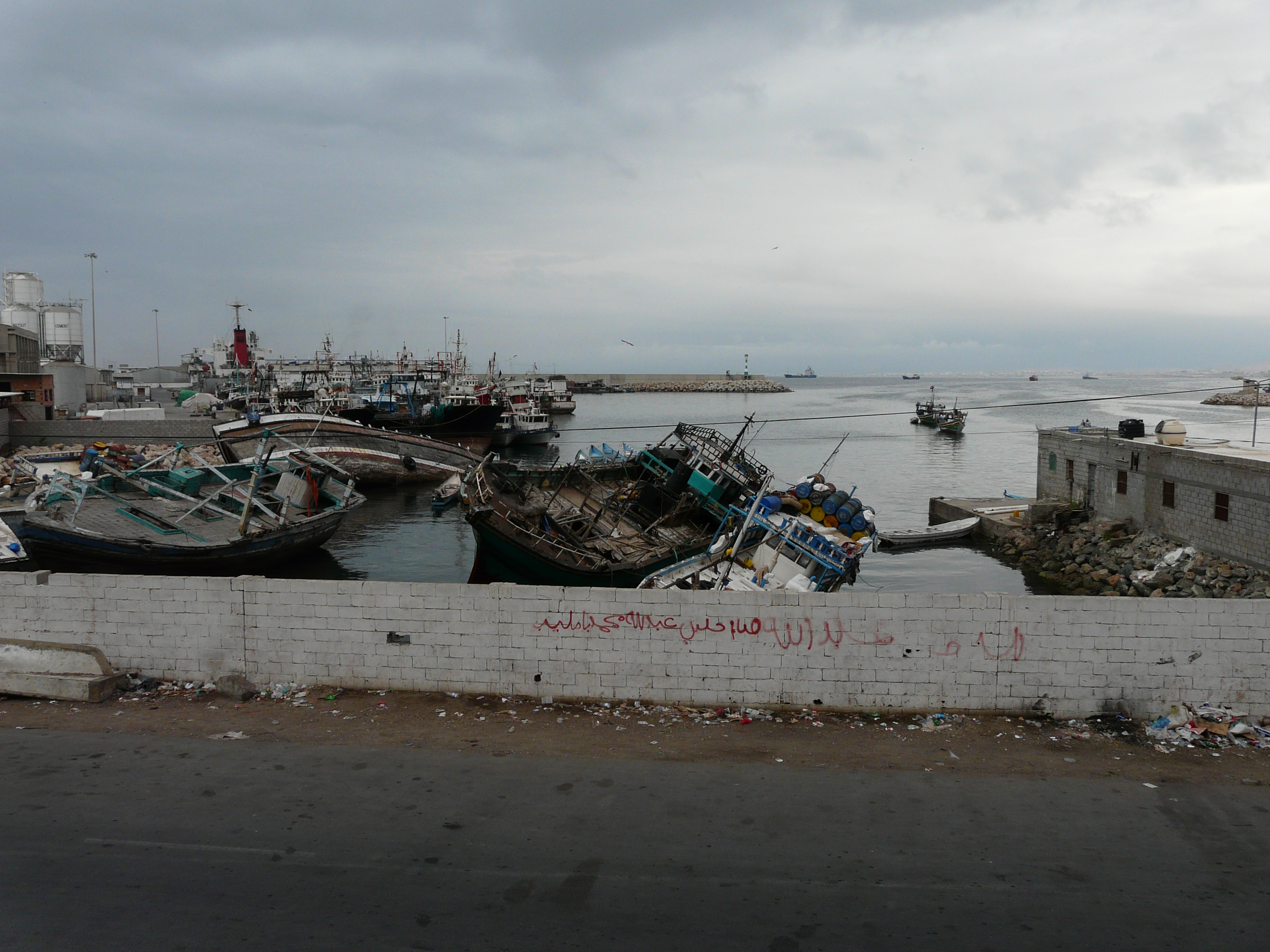
- Interactive map of Port of Mukalla

Location
- Country: Yemen
- Location: Mukalla, Hadhramaut Governorate
- Coordinates: 14.5203°N 49.1514°E

Details
- Opened: January 1985
- Operated by: Yemen Arabian Sea Ports Corporation

Statistics
- Website https://www.yaspc.co/en/ports/port-of-mukalla

The Port of Mukalla is a commercial seaport in Mukalla, the capital of Hadhramaut Governorate in eastern Yemen. It serves as the only maritime facility in the governorate overlooking the Arabian Sea. As a key Yemeni multipurpose port, it caters to the commercial, fishing, and industrial requirements of Hadhramaut and neighbouring governorates. Its facilities handle general cargo, bulk cargo, containers, and other goods, including petroleum products, cement, and agricultural commodities. The modern port was opened in January 1985 in Al-Khalaf, replacing the older harbour facilities in the city.

== Location ==
The port is situated in the Al-Khalaf area, approximately 3 km southeast of Mukalla, on the southern coast of the Arabian Peninsula. It lies about 280 nautical miles east-northeast of Aden and serves as an important maritime gateway for Hadhramaut Governorate and eastern Yemen. The harbour is protected by breakwaters and is entered through a channel with a reported depth of 11 metres. The nearby Qarat al-Mukalla, a prominent hill rising to 390 metres, forms part of the mountainous landscape surrounding the coastal area.

The entrance to the harbour is located between the southern and western breakwaters. According to the investment profile published by Invest in Yemen, the entrance is approximately 105 metres wide, with a depth of about 10 metres, while the turning basin has a diameter of approximately 240 metres. The approach channel is about 500 metres long and has a reported depth of 10 metres. The anchorage area south of the port reaches depths of approximately 60 metres, and the pilot boarding area is situated west of the harbour entrance.

The port receives dry bulk cargo vessels, container vessels, general cargo ships, liquid cargo ships, and RO/RO vessels.

== History ==
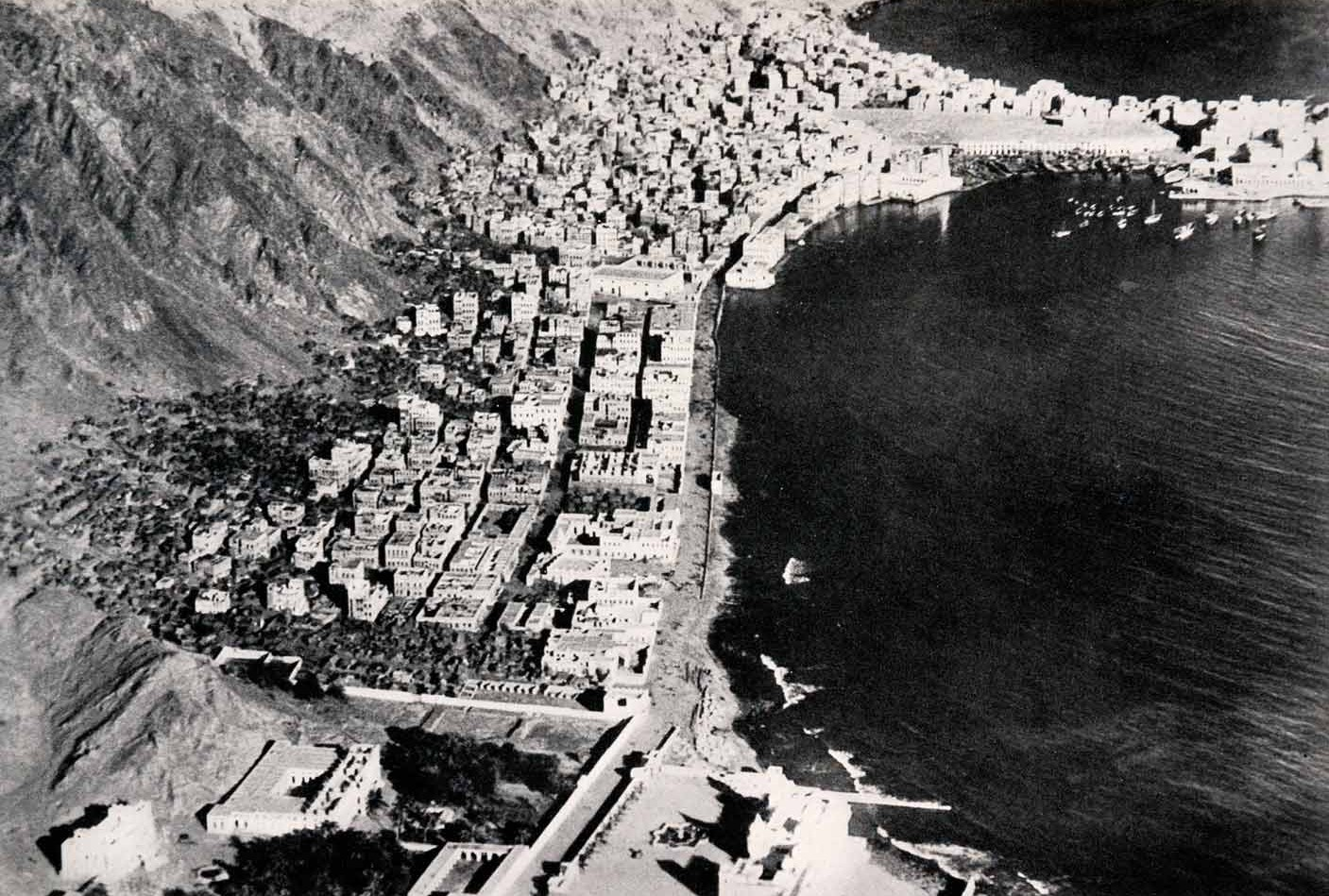
Port of Mukalla in 1932

Mukalla developed as one of the principal maritime settlements on the Hadhramaut coast, whose ports historically connected the region with the wider trading networks of the Indian Ocean. The nearby ports of Ash Shihr, Barum and Sharma also served coastal and regional commerce, while the older port of Ash Shihr had previously functioned as an important outlet for trade and migration from the Hadhramaut hinterland. The port authority traces the use of Mukalla as a maritime station to 1829, when a coal depot was established there by the British to supply passing ships. In 1834, British naval officer Stafford Bettesworth Haines surveyed the Hadhrami coast and described Mukalla as a commercial settlement with a suitable harbour and active maritime trade.

At the beginning of the 20th century, the principal port activities in the region shifted from Ash Shihr to Mukalla. Between 1903 and 1905, a small berth was constructed at Mukalla, followed by the establishment of warehouses and customs and administrative facilities. Cargo was handled using wooden beams and small boats that carried goods between vessels and the shore. The harbour continued to operate in this form until the construction of the modern port at Khalaf.

The development of a new port near Mukalla formed part of the maritime infrastructure programme of the People's Democratic Republic of Yemen. The project at Al-Khalaf included the construction of two deep-water general-cargo berths, a fishing wharf and a breakwater, with financial assistance from Libya. Construction was delayed after the original contractor went bankrupt, and the cost of completing the civil works increased beyond the initial estimate. A 1984 World Bank review reported that the project was intended to allow goods for the Hadhramaut hinterland to be imported directly through the new port, reducing the cost and time involved in transporting them from Aden by road or coastal vessels.

Before the completion of the new facilities, Mukalla received an average of approximately 130 ship calls annually. The port handled about 130,000 tonnes of dry cargo and 55,000 tonnes of oil each year, much of the latter consisting of shipments transferred from Aden. The World Bank estimated that the completed port would be capable of handling between 200,000 and 300,000 tonnes of cargo annually. The modern Port of Mukalla was officially opened in January 1985 in the Khalaf area, allowing ships to berth directly alongside the new quays rather than relying primarily on anchorage and smaller vessels for cargo transfer.

During the Yemeni Civil War, the port was affected by the breakdown of state authority and the conflict between rival armed groups. On 2 April 2015, Al-Qaeda in the Arabian Peninsula (AQAP) seized Mukalla and took control of the port as part of its takeover of the city. The organization altered port fees to attract shipping companies and presented Mukalla as an alternative entry point for commercial vessels at a time when fighting had made calls at Aden more difficult. The port also became an important source of revenue for the group through customs charges and payments on imported goods.

In April 2016, AQAP was driven out of Mukalla by forces backed by the Saudi-led coalition and the United Arab Emirates. The recapture of the city ended Al-Qaeda's control of the port and deprived it of an important source of income. The port subsequently continued to serve as a commercial gateway for eastern Yemen, although the wider conflict and security situation affected maritime activity and investment in its infrastructure.

In November 2024, the Yemen Arabian Sea Ports Corporation reported that maritime activity at Mukalla had declined amid political instability and increased insurance costs for vessels calling at the port. The corporation also highlighted the port's importance in supplying the eastern governorates and called for investment in its infrastructure and technical capabilities.

On 30 December 2025, the Saudi-led coalition carried out an airstrike at the port amid escalating tensions between Saudi Arabia and the United Arab Emirates over the activities of the UAE-backed Southern Transitional Council (STC) in eastern Yemen. According to the coalition, two vessels had arrived from Fujairah in the United Arab Emirates on 27 and 28 December, and their crews had disabled their tracking systems before unloading weapons and military vehicles intended for STC forces in Hadhramaut and Al Mahrah. The coalition stated that its air force had conducted a limited strike against the military cargo unloaded from the vessels.

The United Arab Emirates disputed the allegations that the shipment contained weapons, stating that the vehicles had been sent for use by Emirati forces operating in Yemen. The Associated Press reported that the number of casualties was unclear and quoted a United Nations humanitarian official warning that disruption to the port could affect supply chains and the humanitarian situation. The coalition subsequently announced that the limited operation had been completed and that port operations had returned to normal.

In early January 2026, Saudi-backed government forces retook Mukalla and other positions in Hadhramaut from the STC, whose forces withdrew from the city. The change in control followed the military escalation in eastern Yemen and the airstrike at the port in December.

== Facilities ==
The modern port comprises three principal berths: two commercial berths and a smaller berth serving fishing vessels. The Yemen Arabian Sea Ports Corporation lists the first commercial berth as 177 metres long, with a maximum reported draft of 8.5 metres, and the second as 184 metres long, also with a draft of 8.5 metres. The third berth, used by fishing vessels, is 162 metres long and has a draft of 4.5 metres. The port's original design was intended for vessels of up to 10,000 tonnes, although larger ships have subsequently been received subject to draft and loading restrictions.

The port's land area includes container yards, open storage areas, covered warehouses and tank facilities. The investment profile published by Invest in Yemen gives the total port area as approximately 22 hectares, comprising 12 hectares of water and 10 hectares of land. It lists about four hectares of container storage space, four hectares of open storage yards, 0.5 hectares of covered storage, and 1.5 hectares occupied by tanks. The same profile gives a design cargo-handling capacity of 1.4 million tonnes per year and a container-handling capacity of 15,000 TEU annually; these figures describe the stated design capacity rather than actual yearly throughput.

Cargo-handling equipment listed by the port corporation includes mobile cranes, container-handling machinery, forklifts, trailers and tractors. The port also operates marine tugboats, a pilot boat and mooring boats to support vessel movements and berthing operations. Its equipment includes mobile cranes with lifting capacities of 50 and 60 tonnes, as well as container reach stackers and refrigerated-container connections.

Warehousing and industrial facilities have been developed in partnership with private companies. Part of a warehouse beside berth number 2 was leased in 1997 to Mukalla Raysut Cement Company, which operates cement silos supplied by bulk vessels through pipelines and a cement-packing plant. A warehouse near berth number 1 was leased in 1996 to the Yemeni Cement Silos Company for the unloading and packing of cement. In 2011, an additional area within the port was leased to facilitate the unloading of bulk wheat vessels supplying mills and silo facilities in Hadhramaut.

To address the limited space available for storing containers inside the port, the Yemen Arabian Sea Ports Corporation leased an external container yard approximately seven kilometres away, with a reported storage capacity of 2,500 containers. The additional facility was intended to reduce congestion within the port's operational yards and provide more room for cargo-handling equipment and the storage of other goods.

== Operations ==
The Port of Mukalla is a multipurpose facility handling imported and exported goods for eastern Yemen. Its principal activities include the handling of general cargo, dry bulk commodities, containers, fishing vessels and petroleum-related products. It also receives shipments of cement and wheat, serving industrial facilities and food markets in Hadhramaut and neighbouring governorates. The port's location allows cargo to be delivered directly to the eastern hinterland rather than being transported overland from the larger ports of Aden or Hudaydah.

The port is administered by the Yemen Arabian Sea Ports Corporation, a state-owned entity responsible for ports on Yemen's Arabian Sea coast. The corporation publishes annual and monthly statistics on vessel movements, cargo and container traffic at Mukalla. Its development proposals include extending the existing breakwater and adding a 300-metre berth, or constructing a new breakwater with three additional berths in the area behind it. The corporation has stated that either expansion option would require government approval and funding.

== See also ==
- Port of Aden
- Port of Hudaydah
- Port of Nishtun
- Ash Shihr
- Yemen Arabian Sea Ports Corporation
- Yemen Gulf of Aden Ports Corporation
- Yemen Red Sea Ports Corporation
