= History of Socotra =

1835 map of the Socotra Island

The history of the Yemenite archipelago of Socotra describes the cultures, events, peoples and strategic relevance for sea trade for the archipelago. Lying between the Guardafui Channel and the Arabian Sea and near major shipping routes, Socotra is the largest of the four islands in the Socotra archipelago.

== Etymology ==
Scholars' views vary regarding the origin of the island's name. One theory is that the term Socotra may derive from a Greek name that is derived from the name of a South Arabian tribe mentioned in Sabaic and Ḥaḍramitic inscriptions as Dhū-Śakūrid (s³krd). Another theory is that the Arabic term Suqutra breaks down as follows: suq means 'market', and qutra is a vulgar form of qatir, which refers to dragon's blood. The capital city of Socotra was Suq as reported by the Portuguese in the 16th century, which they referred to as market place.

== Ancient history ==
By the turn of the Common Era, Socotra was on the crossroads of commerce based on the monsoon winds. This sea trade brought together people from the coasts of the western Indian Ocean, Red Sea and East-Africa, as well as the Mediterranean. Socotra contributed to this sea trade with tortoise shells and resins of Myrrh, Frankincense and dragon tree, highly prized as fragrant incense and widely used in medicine and cosmetics.

From the fourth century, demand for the resins declined giving way to a cattle-breeding economy organized in pastoral tribes.

=== Written sources ===
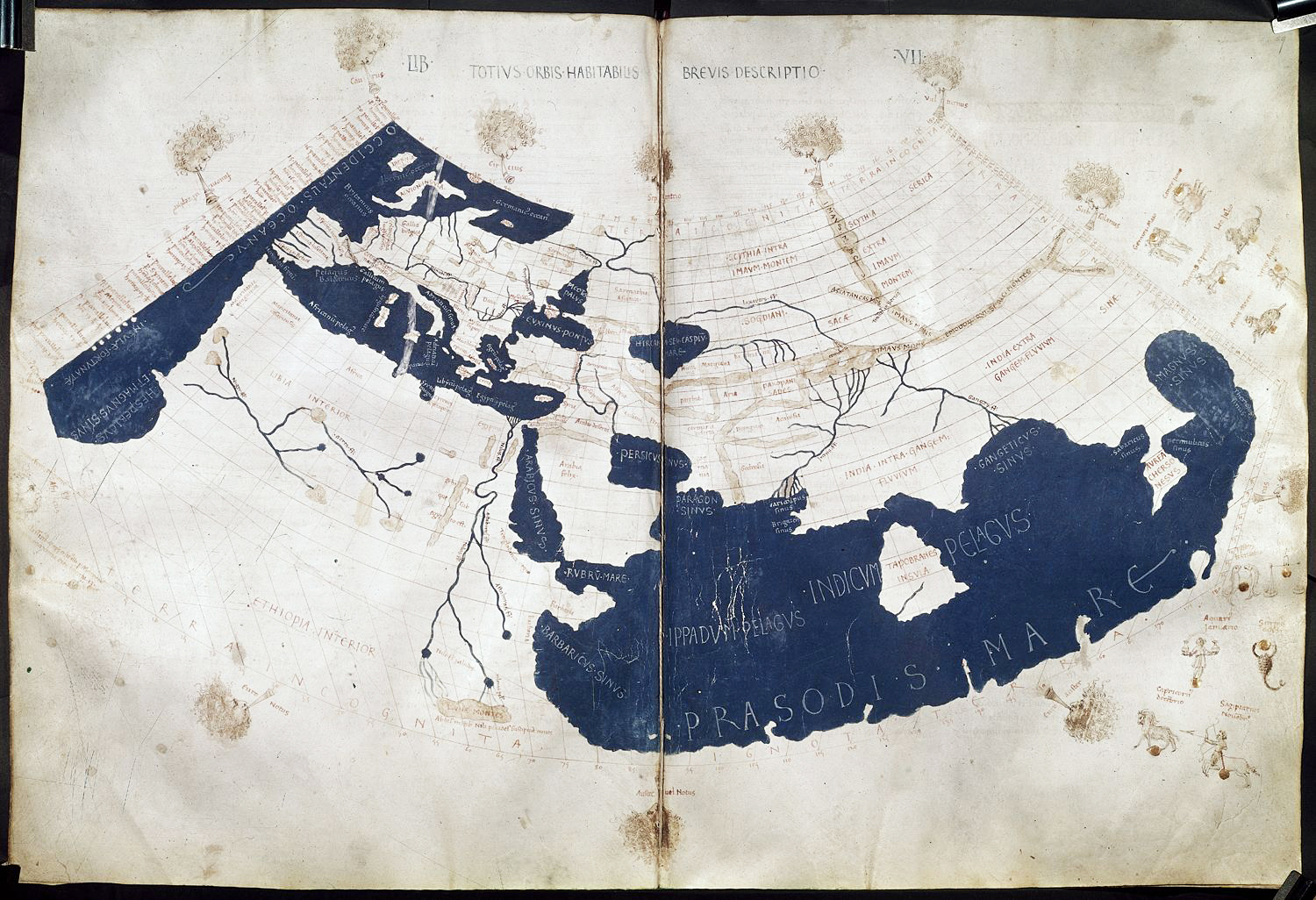
Socotra on Ptolemy's world map, reconstituted from his Geography in the 15th century

In the late 2nd century BCE, Agatharchides recorded merchants from Potana, coming to the "Blessed Islands" (Socotra) to trade with Alexandrian merchants.

The Periplus of the Erythraean Sea, a first-century CE Greek navigation aid describes Socotra as follows:

The inhabitants, few in number, live on one side of the island, that to the north, the part facing the mainland; they are settlers, a mixture of Arabs and Indians and even some Greeks, who sail out of there to trade.

— Periplus of the Erythraean Sea, §30

[The island was] subject to the King of the frankincense-bearing land [i.e. the Kingdom of Hadhramaut].

— Periplus of the Erythraean Sea, §31

The Weilüe, a Chinese historical text written in the third century CE states:

The king of Zesan (Socotra) is subject to Da Qin (Rome). His seat of government is in the middle of the sea… [Zesan] is in close communication with Angu city (Gerrha) in Anxi (Parthia).

=== Petroglyph sites ===
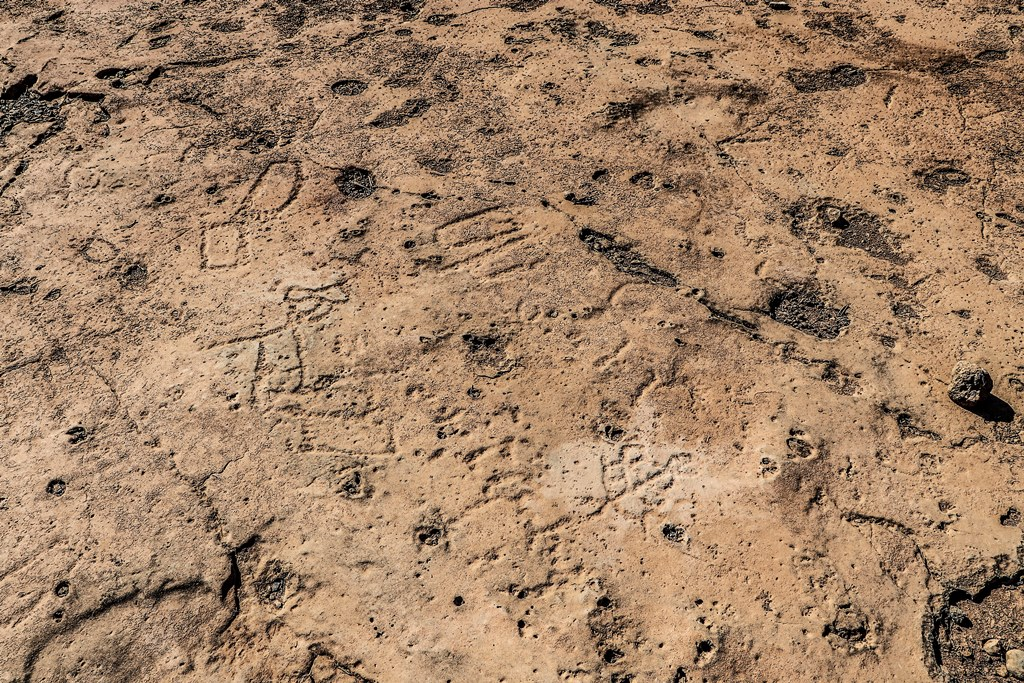
Eriosh Petroglyphs

- The Eriosh Petroglyphs, located on the north coast 20 km south-west of the capital Hadibu, contain petroglyphs depicting figures of men, camels, foot symbols and crosses of uncertain date.
- On the outskirts of Suq 2.5 km west of Hadibu there is a petroglyph site containing cruciform shaped, plant-like, and foot symbols.
- Hoq Cave, situated on the north-eastern coast of the island, contains a large number of inscriptions, drawings and archaeological objects. Investigation showed that these had been left by sailors who visited the island between the first century BCE and the sixth century CE. Texts are written in Indian Brāhmī, South Arabian, Ethiopic, Greek, Palmyrene and in Bactrian scripts and languages. This corpus of nearly 250 texts and drawings constitutes one of the main sources for the investigation of Indian Ocean trade networks at that time, indicating the diverse origins of those who used Socotra as a trading base in antiquity.
- The Dahaisi Cave, located in the eastern interior of the island on the Momi Plateau, contains pictograms of cruciform and geometric patterns, Arabic inscriptions as well as zoomorphic figures attributed to between the first century BCE and the fifteen century CE.

== Medieval history ==
The earliest account concerning the presence of Christians in Socotra stems from the 6th century CE Greek merchant Cosmas Indicopleustes, who holds that there were - still Greek speaking - colonists on the island once settled by the Ptolemies.

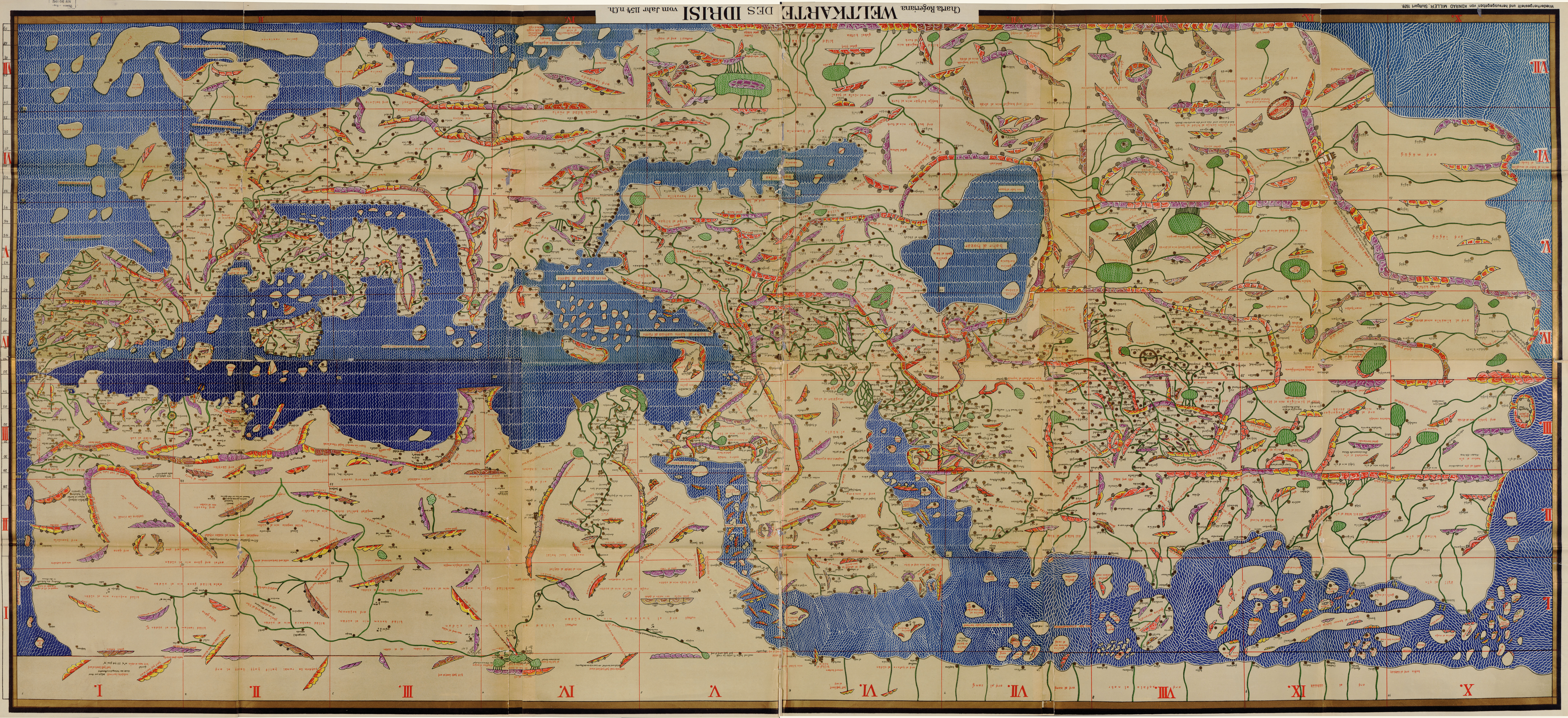
Socotra on the Tabula Rogeriana, drawn by Muhammad al-Idrisi in 1154

In 880, an Ethiopian expeditionary force conquered the island and an Oriental Orthodox bishop was consecrated. The Ethiopians were later dislodged by an armada sent by Imam Al-Salt bin Malik of Oman.

In his Geography of the Arabian Peninsula (Sifat Jazirat ul-Arab), Abu Muhammad al-Hasan al-Hamdani (893 – 945) describes the geography and the linguistic situation of the Arabian peninsula and Socotra stating, that Alexander the Great sent Greeks to Socotra to cultivate the endemic aloe.

The geographer Yaqut al-Hamawi (1179–1229) writes: "Whoever is bound for the Land of the Zanj sails past Socotra. The majority of its population are Christian Arabs. Thence are delivered aloe and the resin of a tree which grows only on this island."

The Persian geographer Ibn al-Mujawir (1204-1291) shed much light on the culture and everyday life of the Socotrans giving clues to their ancient religious beliefs, particularly in the references to good and evil jinns. He reported that there were two groups of people on the island, the indigenous mountain dwellers and the foreign coastal dwellers.

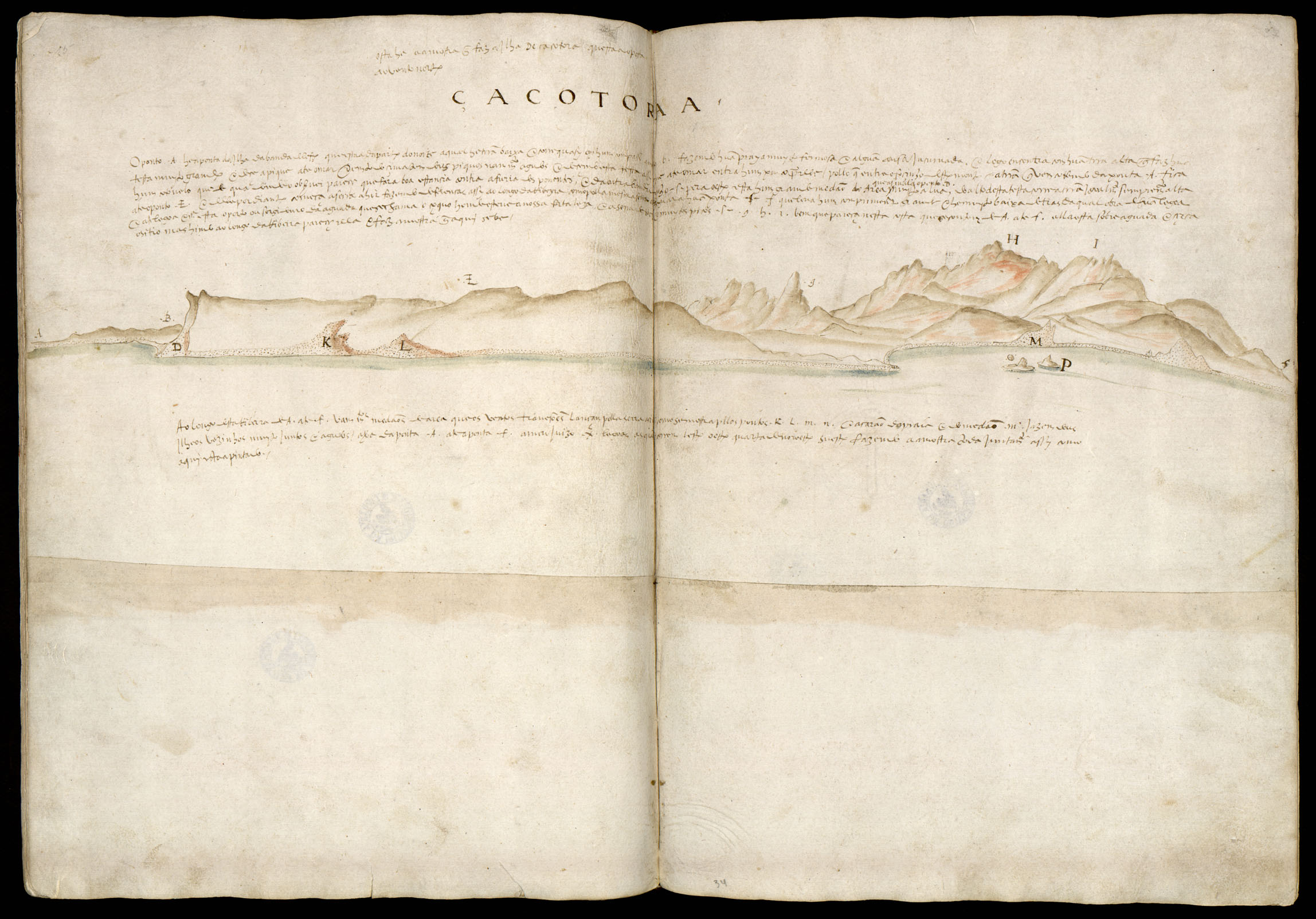
A view over the island of Çacotoraa, drawn in 1541 by the Portuguese nobleman João de Castro

Socotra is also mentioned in the Travels of Marco Polo. Although Marco Polo did not pass anywhere near the island, he reports that "the inhabitants are baptized Christians and have an archbishop", who "has nothing to do with the Pope in Rome, but is subject to an archbishop who lives at Baghdad”. Prior to Marco Polo, in the 10th century, the Arabic geographer Al-Masudi noted that Socotra was at that time a pirate base: “Let me tell you further that many corsairs put in at this island at the end of a cruise and pitch camp here and sell their booty".

In 1507, a Portuguese fleet commanded by Tristão da Cunha with Afonso de Albuquerque landed at the then capital of Suq and captured its port after a stiff battle against the Mahra Sultanate. Their objective was to set a base in a strategic place on the route to India. The infertility of the land led the Portuguese abandon the island in 1511. The island reverted to the control of the Mahra Sultanate, and the inhabitants converted to Islam.

== Modern era ==
In 1834, the East India Company stationed a garrison on Socotra in the expectation that the Mahra sultan of Qishn and Socotra, who resided at Qishn on the mainland, would accept an offer to sell the island. The lack of good anchorages proved to be as much a problem for the British as the Portuguese, and there was nowhere for a coaling station to be used by the new steamship line on the Suez-Bombay route. Faced with the unexpected firm refusal of the sultan to sell, the British left in 1835. After the capture of Aden in 1839, they lost all interest in acquiring Socotra for now.

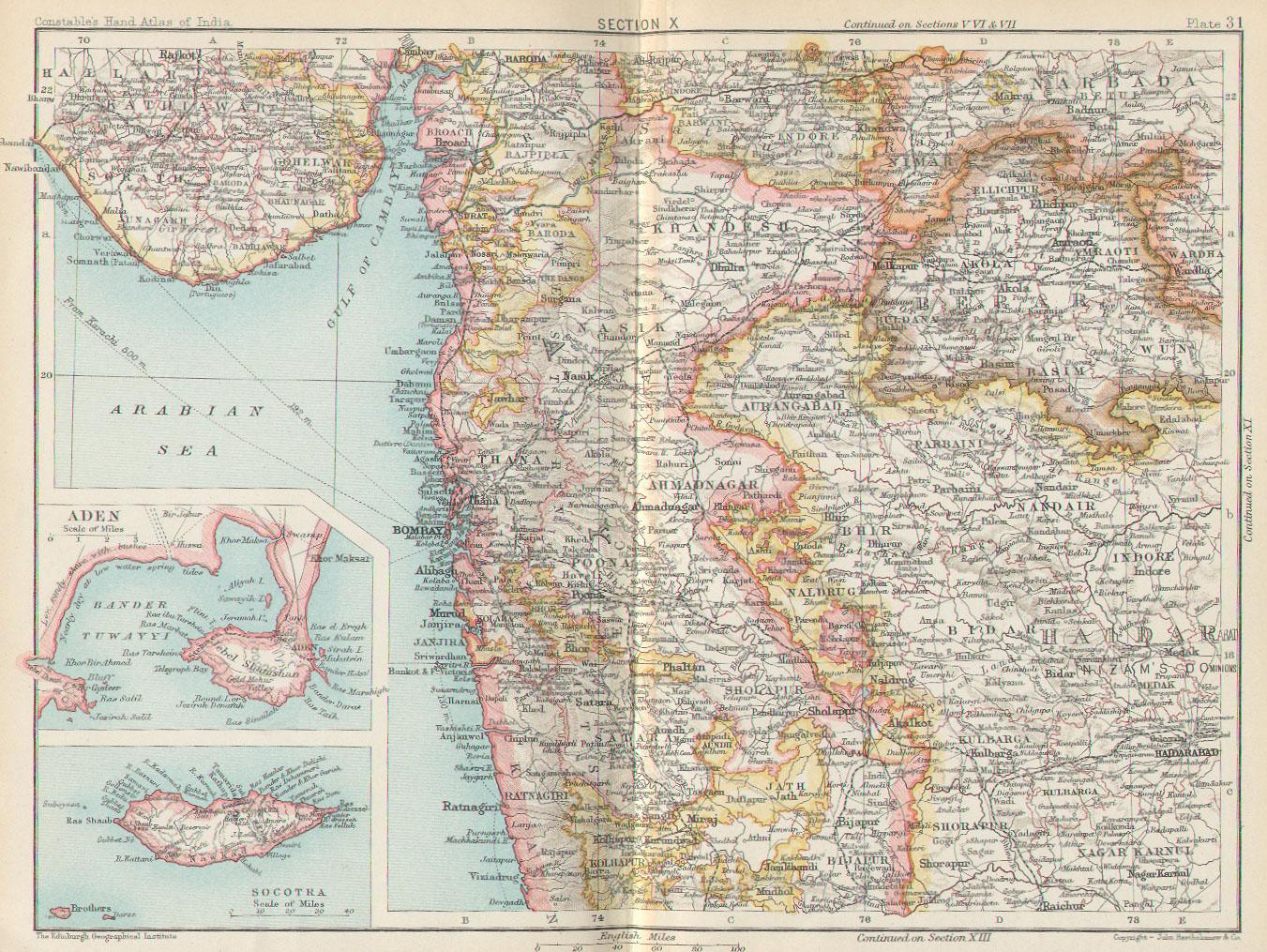
1893 map of the Bombay Presidency including Aden Province and Socotra

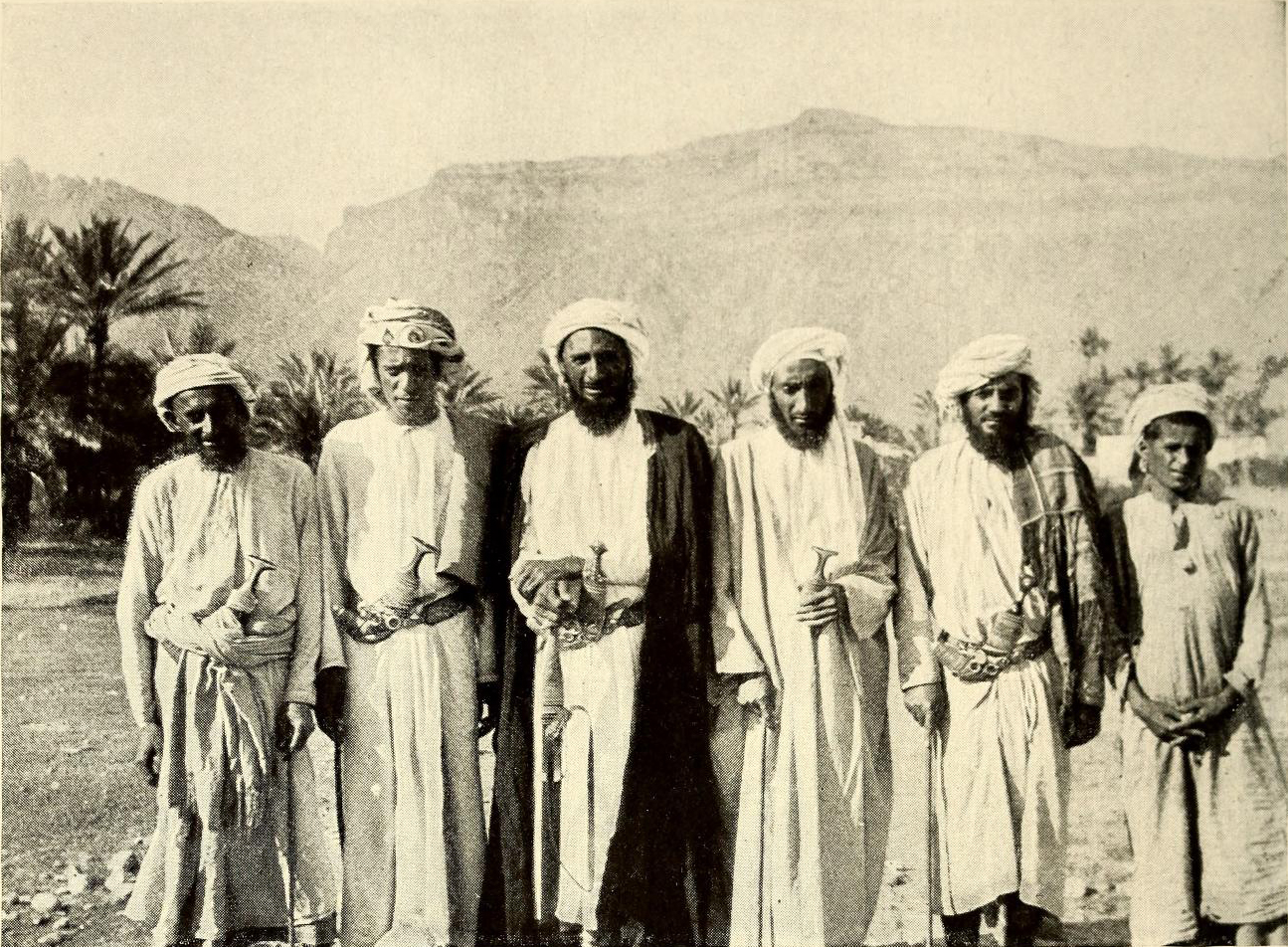
Local men from Socotra 1918

In January 1876, in exchange for a payment of 3,000 thalers and a yearly subsidy, the sultan pledged "himself, his heirs and successors, never to cede, to sell, to mortgage, or otherwise give for occupation, save to the British Government, the Island of Socotra or any of its dependencies." Additionally, he pledged to assist any European vessel that wrecked on the island and protect the crew, the passengers and the cargo, in exchange for a suitable reward.

In April 1886, the British government concluded a protectorate treaty with the sultan in which he promised this time to "refrain from entering into any correspondence, agreement, or treaty with any foreign nation or power, except with the knowledge and sanction of the British Government", and give immediate notice to the British Resident at Aden of any attempt by another power to interfere with Socotra and its dependencies. Apart from those obligations, this preemptive protectorate treaty, designed above all to seal off Socotra against competition from other colonial powers, however, left the sultan in control of the island.

In 1897, the P&O ship Aden sank after being wrecked on a reef near Socotra, with the loss of 78 lives. As some of the cargo had been plundered by islanders, the sultan was reminded of his obligations under the agreement of 1876.

The Sultanate of Mahra disposed of two main revenue sources in Socotra:

- The British annual payment of protectorate fees.
- Taxation of the by-products (e.g. ghee, dates) of a transhumant subsistence pastoralism with herds of goat, sheep, cow, and camel, fishing or date farming in a nearly cashless, and thus barter economy.

== 20th century–present ==
In October 1967, in the wake of the departure of the British from Aden and southern Arabia, the Mahra Sultanate was abolished. On 30 November of the same year, Socotra became part of South Yemen. Since Yemeni unification in 1990, Socotra has been a part of the Republic of Yemen.

Socotra was ravaged by the 26 December 2004 tsunami causing the death of a child and 40 fishing boats wrecked although the island is 4,600 km (2,858 mi) far away from tsunami epicentre off the west coast of Aceh, Indonesia.

In 2015, the cyclones Chapala and Megh struck the island, causing severe damage to its infrastructure.

=== United Arab Emirates takeover ===
Beginning in 2015, the UAE began increasing its presence on Socotra, first with humanitarian aid in the wake of tropical cyclones Chapala and Megh, and eventually establishing a military presence on the island. On April 30, 2018, the UAE, as part of the ongoing Saudi Arabian–led intervention in Yemen, landed troops on the island and took control of Socotra Airport and seaport. On May 14, 2018, Saudi troops were also deployed on the island, and a deal was brokered between the UAE and Yemen for a joint military training exercise and the return of administrative control of the airport and seaport to Yemen.

In May 2019, the Yemeni government accused the UAE of landing around 100 separatist troops in Socotra, which the UAE denied, deepening a rift between the two nominal allies in Yemen's civil war. In February 2020, a regiment of the Yemeni army stationed in Socotra rebelled and pledged allegiance to the UAE-backed separatist Southern Transitional Council (STC) in Socotra, renouncing the UN-backed government of Abdrabbuh Mansur Hadi. The STC seized control of the island in June 2020.

According to media reports in 2020 and 2022, the UAE is set to establish military and intelligence facilities on the Socotra Archipelago. Initially, the UAE were part of the Saudi Arabian–led intervention in Yemen launched in 2011. But this cooperation later showed cracks due to diverging geopolitical goals that led the UAE reducing its intervention forces in Yemen from 2019 onwards, while increasing its support to the STC and taking over Socotra in pursuing their own geostrategic interests to retain influence across Yemen's southern coastal areas. This take-over was declared illegitimate by Yemen President Hadi stating that the UAE was acting like an occupier.
