= Port of Nashtoon =

- Interactive map of Port of Nashtoon
- Location within Yemen

Location
- Country: Yemen
- Location: Al Mahrah Governorate
- Coordinates: 15°49′13″N 52°11′49″E

Details
- Opened: April 1984
- Operated by: Yemen Arabian Sea Ports Corporation

The Port of Nashtoon (also spelled Nishtun or Nishtoon) is a seaport on the Arabian Sea in Al Mahrah Governorate, eastern Yemen. Established as a multipurpose facility, it serves general cargo and fishing vessels and provides a maritime outlet for Al Mahrah and neighbouring areas. The port is operated by the Yemen Arabian Sea Ports Corporation.

== Location ==
The port is situated at Nashtoon on the Arabian Sea coast, approximately 60 kilometres west of Al Ghaydah, the capital of Al Mahrah Governorate, and relatively close to the border with Oman. Its position on Yemen's eastern seaboard makes it a point of entry for maritime traffic serving the governorate and a link with trading routes across the Arabian Sea and the Gulf region. The port's activities have included the handling of general cargo, petroleum products, and fishery-related traffic.

== Construction and early operations ==
The development of Nashtoon as a modern port formed part of a wider programme to expand fisheries and maritime infrastructure in eastern Yemen. The project was supported by the World Bank, which approved financing for a fisheries and general cargo port in Al Mahrah Governorate, together with facilities for fish processing, storage and distribution and improved connections with fishing communities along the coast.

Construction was completed in 1984, and the cargo port opened to shipping in April of that year. Its development was intended to provide berthing for general cargo vessels, support industrial and artisanal fishing, and connect the relatively isolated eastern coastal region with markets elsewhere in Yemen and abroad. Cargo operations began with conventional ships in 1984 and with traditional sailing vessels, or dhows, in 1985. In its first three years, the port handled 20,091 tonnes of cargo in 1984 and 43,712 tonnes in 1985, before recording 26,252 tonnes in 1986. The 1985 total included both ship and dhow traffic.

The original port complex included a 210-metre main wharf and a separate 150-metre berth for smaller vessels. Its facilities also comprised a slipway for small craft, engineering and carpentry workshops, a power station, a desalination plant and fuel storage installations. The fisheries component was equipped with fish-processing and freezing facilities, including an ice plant designed to produce 40 tonnes of flake ice per day, blast freezers and cold stores. These installations were intended to allow catches from nearby fishing communities to be processed and stored before being transported to domestic markets or exported.

Despite the scale of the original investment, the operation of the fisheries facilities encountered technical and management difficulties. A 2001 regional assessment reported that the ice plant at Nishtun was no longer operating and that its cold-storage facilities were out of service, limiting the port's capacity to support the local fishing industry. A report by the Yemeni newspaper Al-Ayyam in December 2006 also described the deterioration of several installations, including the power generators, ice factory, desalination plant, boat workshop and fish-storage facilities. The port's executive director said that some of its remaining operational activities were concentrated in the petroleum installations and the port and customs administrations.

== Rehabilitation and later development ==
A fisheries rehabilitation project was undertaken as part of the World Bank's Fifth Fisheries Project. The works, which began in September 2011 and were completed in 2013, cost approximately US$5.5 million. The project included a fish-landing quay, a cold store with a capacity of 800 tonnes, 48 storage units for fishermen, a fuel station with three tanks, administrative buildings and a fish-preparation hall. It also provided fish auction facilities, three refrigerated fish containers, a 2-megawatt power station, a desalination plant and an ice factory with a production capacity of 40 tonnes per day. The project was formally inaugurated by the Minister of Fisheries and the governor of Al Mahrah in April 2013, restoring important services for fish handling and storage.

In September 2017, the Yemeni government announced plans to develop the port by increasing its depth to 7.5 metres, with the stated aim of allowing larger vessels to enter and improving the movement of commercial shipping. The announcement formed part of a proposed development programme; it did not in itself establish that the planned dredging had been completed.

In October 2018, Cyclone Luban struck eastern Yemen, bringing heavy rainfall and flooding to coastal areas of Al Mahrah. The storm caused damage to infrastructure in the governorate, and the local authorities subsequently reported that parts of Nashtoon port had also been damaged. Despite the deterioration, the port continued to receive some traditional wooden vessels carrying food and construction materials from the Gulf states and the Horn of Africa.

In February 2016, port officials reported maintenance work on the quay, including the installation of lighting and the inspection of a crane used for loading and unloading. Work was also underway to improve the petroleum-supply system, including pipelines connecting the quay to the port's pumping facilities and fuel tanks.

== Facilities and operations ==
Nashtoon has one multipurpose commercial berth measuring 210 metres in length. According to the port authority, the water depth reaches 7 metres at the outer end of the berth and decreases to approximately 3 metres towards its inner section. The port's listed cargo-handling equipment includes two 30-tonne mobile cranes, a 20-tonne mobile crane and a 30-tonne forklift.

The port handles general cargo and petroleum products, while its location and supporting facilities also serve the fishing sector. Reported cargoes have included foodstuffs and construction materials brought by vessels from the Gulf and the Horn of Africa. Fish landed in the area has traditionally included sardines, some of which are dried for sale, while the port's rehabilitated facilities provide for fish unloading, preparation, freezing and storage.

Nashtoon is administered by the Yemen Arabian Sea Ports Corporation, which is responsible for its port operations and development. Its role in the economy of Al Mahrah is linked to the supply of essential commodities, the movement of petroleum products, and the handling and marketing of fishery products.

== See also ==
- Port of Mukalla
- Port of Aden
- Hudaydah Port
- Yemen Arabian Sea Ports Corporation
- Economy of Yemen
