= Port of Socotra =

- Interactive map of Port of Socotra
- Location within Yemen

Location
- Country: Yemen
- Location: Socotra Governorate, Socotra
- Coordinates: 12.6821°N 54.0803°E

Details
- Opened: 1996
- Operated by: Yemen Arabian Sea Ports Corporation

The Port of Socotra is a seaport on the island of Socotra, Yemen, serving the Socotra Governorate. Located at Hawlaf, east of the island's capital, Hadibu, it is the archipelago's principal maritime gateway and a major entry point for imported food and petroleum products. The port is operated by the Yemen Arabian Sea Ports Corporation.

== Location ==
The port is situated at Hawlaf on the eastern coast of Socotra Island, approximately 5 km (3.1 mi) east of Hadibu. The island lies in the Arabian Sea, in the northwestern Indian Ocean, and is separated from mainland Yemen by the Gulf of Aden. Owing to the island's remoteness and limited land transport links with the mainland, maritime shipping is important for the movement of commercial goods and essential supplies to its population.

== History ==
The development of a modern seaport on Socotra formed part of wider efforts to improve the island's infrastructure following the unification of North and South Yemen in 1990, which brought the island into closer contact with mainland Yemen. Construction of the port's initial jetty began in 1996. The facility was built with a 45-metre (148 ft) berth and an initial draft of 5 metres (16 ft), providing a maritime gateway for commercial shipping and the supply of essential goods, particularly foodstuffs and petroleum products, to the island. By February 1998, the port's platform, reported to have a capacity of 10,000 tonnes, had been completed and was receiving merchant vessels from Yemen and abroad.

The port's maritime approach was affected by the 2004 tsunami. The Yemen Arabian Sea Ports Corporation subsequently carried out renovation work in 2008 to restore maritime access and maintain the flow of commercial supplies to the island.

In November 2015, the port sustained severe damage during Cyclone Chapala and Cyclone Megh, which struck the Socotra archipelago within days of each other. The storms caused extensive damage to the island's infrastructure and coastal settlements.

The port's maritime facilities were subsequently maintained and rehabilitated with funding from the United Arab Emirates. According to the port authority, the rehabilitation works at Hawlaf increased the berth length to 135 metres (443 ft), while the water depth alongside it ranged from 4.5 to 6 metres (15 to 20 ft). The works were intended to restore maritime operations and maintain the supply of essential goods, particularly foodstuffs and petroleum products, to the island.

== Facilities and operations ==
The Port of Socotra is a small commercial facility handling maritime traffic between the island, mainland Yemen and neighbouring countries. It serves as the principal seaport for importing foodstuffs, petroleum derivatives and other supplies required by the island's population. Its role is particularly important because of Socotra's geographical isolation and the limited alternatives for transporting large quantities of goods.

The port's equipment includes a 30-tonne mobile crane and a five-tonne forklift, which are used in cargo-handling operations. Its facilities are comparatively limited in scale, and the port is exposed to seasonal weather conditions that can disrupt maritime access. The south-west monsoon season, in particular, can make sea transport to the island difficult and interrupt the movement of vessels and supplies.

== Proposed port development ==
In January 2021, the Yemen Arabian Sea Ports Corporation invited consultants to express interest in preparing studies and designs for a proposed new seaport at Qerma, with part of a credit agreement from the Kuwait Fund for Arab Economic Development allocated to the project. On 20 March 2025, Presidential Leadership Council member Aidarous al-Zubaidi, accompanied by the governor of Socotra and the ministers of transport and planning and international cooperation, laid the foundation stone for the planned port. The proposed facilities included two breakwaters, a berth for vessels carrying up to 10,000 tonnes, a manoeuvring basin 265 metres in diameter and 10 metres deep, a navigation channel 14 metres deep, and administrative, customs and maintenance facilities.

In May 2025, the Ministry of Transport discussed the steps required to proceed with the project, including the completion of technical studies and designs and the selection of a consulting firm. The project was then estimated to cost US$50 million. In October 2026, government officials were still discussing the completion of the project's technical studies, designs and administrative procedures before referring it to the tender committee, indicating that construction had not yet proceeded to the implementation stage.

The Qerma project is a separate development from the existing port at Hawlaf. The Yemen Arabian Sea Ports Corporation lists Qerma as a future port construction project, while its procurement notice identifies the site as the location for the construction of a new port.

== See also ==
- Socotra
- Yemen Arabian Sea Ports Corporation
- Port of Mukalla
- Port of Aden
- Port of Nishtun
