= Aden Free Zone =

Free-trade zone in Yemen

Aden Free Zone (AFZ)

Location
- Country: Yemen
- Location: CALTEX-ADEN
- Coordinates: 12°48′31″N 44°59′31″E

Details
- Operated by: Aden Free Zone Authority
- Owned by: Government of Yemen
- President: Hassan Haid

Statistics
- Type: Free-trade zone

The Aden Free Zone (AFZ) Arabic: المنطقة الحرة عدن, romanized: almintaqat alhurat eadn, lit. 'Free Zone Aden' is a free-trade zone in Yemen established in the city of Aden in compliance with the Yemeni Free Zones law of 1993.

== Overview ==
After the unification of Yemen on May 22, 1990, the city of Aden was designated as the economic and commercial capital of the Republic of Yemen.

The Free zone is an independent body with full legal personality and independent financial authority; however it operates with co-operation with the Gulf of Aden Ports Authority, which includes the Aden Container Port and Aden International Airport.

== Location and general characteristics ==
Aden is the second largest city, commercial and economic Capital of the Republic of Yemen. One of the most important centers in the trade activity that supports Yemeni economy. Has a strategic location at the entrance to the Red Sea and almost all traffic between Europe and Asia passes within a few miles of the port entrance.

== See also ==
- Free Trade Area
- International Trade
