= De Geest =

De Geest may refer to:

- Gerrit De Geest, a Belgian legal scholar and writer
- Wybrand de Geest, a Dutch Golden Age portrait painter from Friesland
- Tablet De Geest, a wooden tablet found in the Hoq Cave on the island of Socotra, in the Guardafui Channel off the tip of the Horn of Africa
