= Eriosh Petroglyphs =

Petroglyphs on Socotra, Yemen

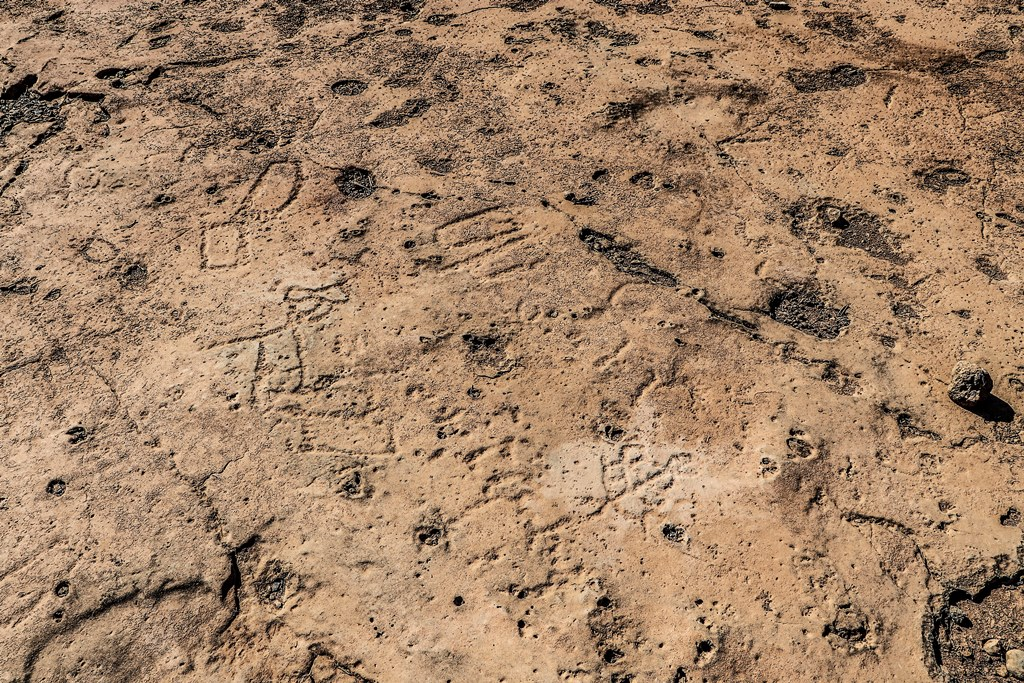
- Eriosh Petroglyphs: foot symbols
- Interactive map of Eriosh Petroglyphs
- 12°35′38″N 53°49′8″E
- Location: Socotra, Yemen

The Eriosh Petroglyphs or Iryosh Petroglyphs or petroglyphs of Ariyūsh are a group of petroglyph carvings in the north-western coastal plain of Socotra island, Yemen. The group consists of pecked or carved graffiti, feet, geometric and crucial shapes, animals and anthropomorphs. The site is of unknown origin and age.

== Characteristics ==
The site is located about 20 km south-west of Hadibu near Ghubbah on the bottom of a shallow ephemeral freshwater lake. It lies on a flat limestone plain spanning approximately one ha, divided by the vegetation into smaller outcrops and covered by a layer of fine fluvial sediments, dried up most of the year but submerged by water during the rains of the monsoon period.

The drawings depict feet, outlines of feet mostly in pairs, cloven hoof prints, crosses within circles or squares, and animals. The foot motifs are the most common symbol of the site. Many cruciform shapes are directly associated with foot motifs positioned either between or directly in front of them. The graffiti may bear a resemblance to the characters of early South Arabian inscriptions of the mainland with Ethiopic characteristics.

Although the site is the largest and best known petroglyph spot on Socotra, the chronological sequence is not clear as no full-scale archaeological survey or record of the entire site has been made so far. Some scholars have attributed the crosses to the Christian presence on Socotra, dating to sometime between the fourth and fifth centuries AD and relating them in part to those found on other archaeological spots of the island i.a. Hoq Cave and Suq. Others suggest that these symbols may be a thousand years older.

== Gallery ==
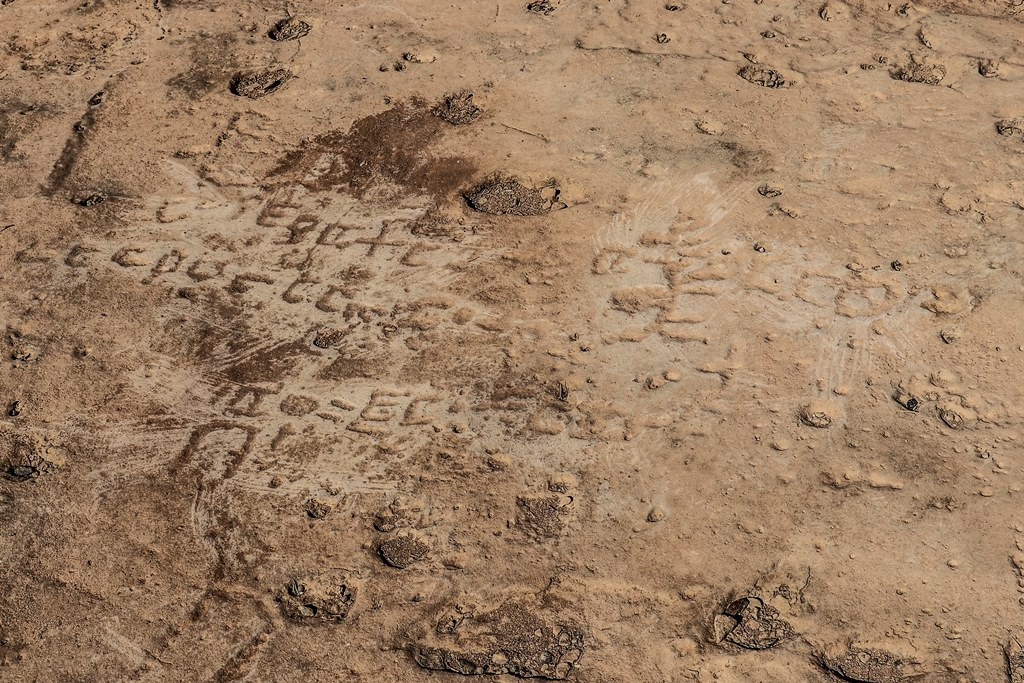
Graffiti

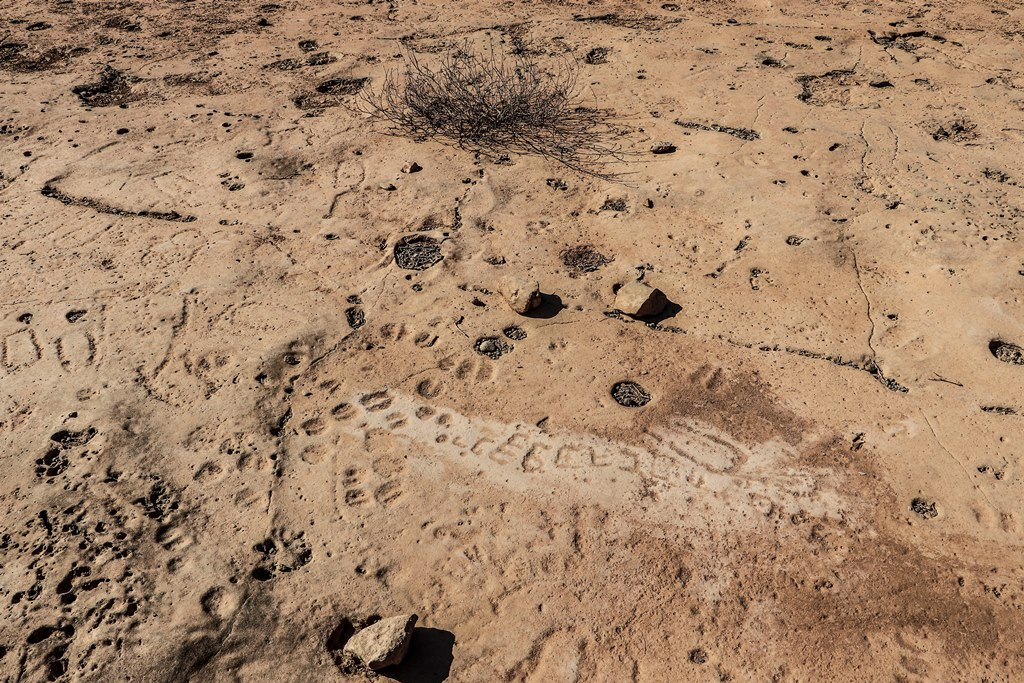
Cloven hoof prints

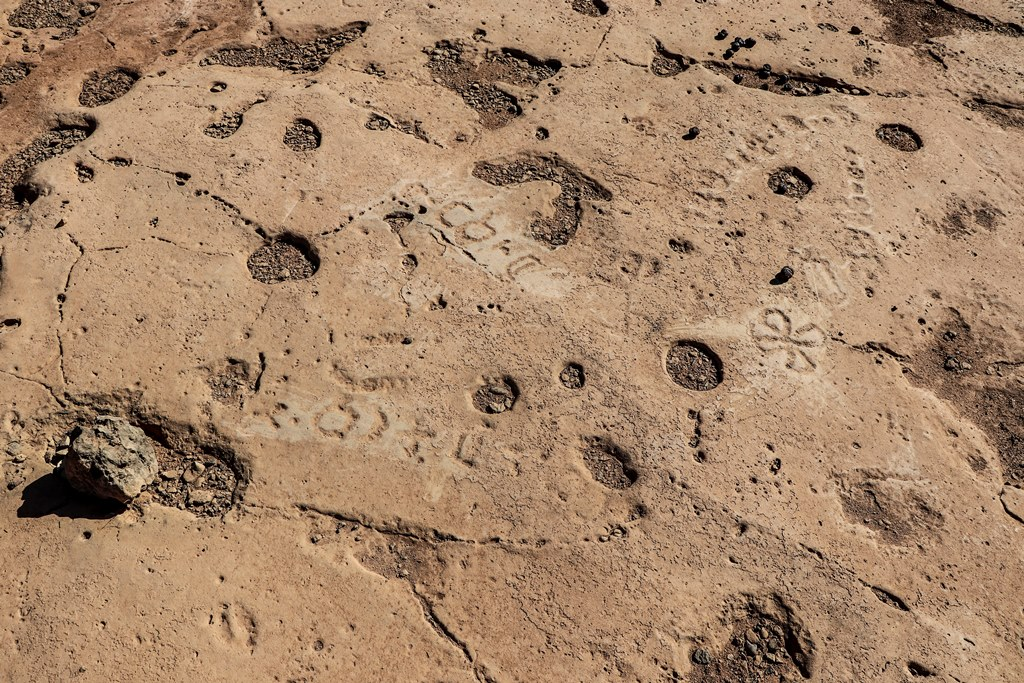
Crosses
