= Granular ice =

Granular ice is one of the types of ice commonly referred to as Flake ice.

== Creation ==
Made in a tall, thin, vertical drum or 'freezing unit' with an auger running axially in the centre. A water level is set in the bottom of the drum by gravity and as ice crystals begin to form, the auger carries them up the drum where they are compressed and further frozen until they are ejected from the top as 'flakes'.

By changing the geometry of the auger and introducing 'ice breakers' into the ejection arrangement, the size and appearance of the ice can be changed to suit different applications.

== Storage ==
As the ice is made at -0.5 degrees °C, it can be stored for prolonged periods in ambient conditions and all it will ever do is melt. However this means that the ice does contain more free water than colder types, therefore it is not suitable for storage in freezers below zero.

== Usage ==
The medium size is widely used by fishmongers and supermarkets for fish display, so is probably the type of 'flake ice' that the average person is likely to have seen.

Due to its properties of rapid cooling/melting, the small size of granular ice is used widely by the process industries, particularly food manufacture for cooling products made in mixers or bowl choppers such as dough or sausage meat, here it is mostly known as "fine ice" or "micro ice". It is also used in laboratories where it is often referred to as "crushed ice".

The large size is most commonly used on board trawlers and for field cooling/packing of vegetables such as asparagus and broccoli. This is variously referred to as "flake ice", "large ice" and "macro ice".
