= As-Salif =

As-Salif الصليف
- Village
- Location in Yemen
- Coordinates: 15°18′39″N 42°40′23″E
- Country: Yemen
- Governorate: Al Hudaydah Governorate
- District: As-Salif
- Time zone: UTC+3 (Yemen Standard Time)

As-Salif (Arabic: الصليف, Aṣ-Ṣalīf, also transliterated as al-Salif) is a coastal village in western Yemen. It is located in a bay of a headland that forms the southern coast of the Kamaran Bay. As-Salif is recognized for its large deposits of rock salt. Historically, the salt was exported to India. The salt is mined by a government-owned corporation. Port of Salif is located on the coast.
