= Hoq Cave =

Cave on Socotra, Yemen

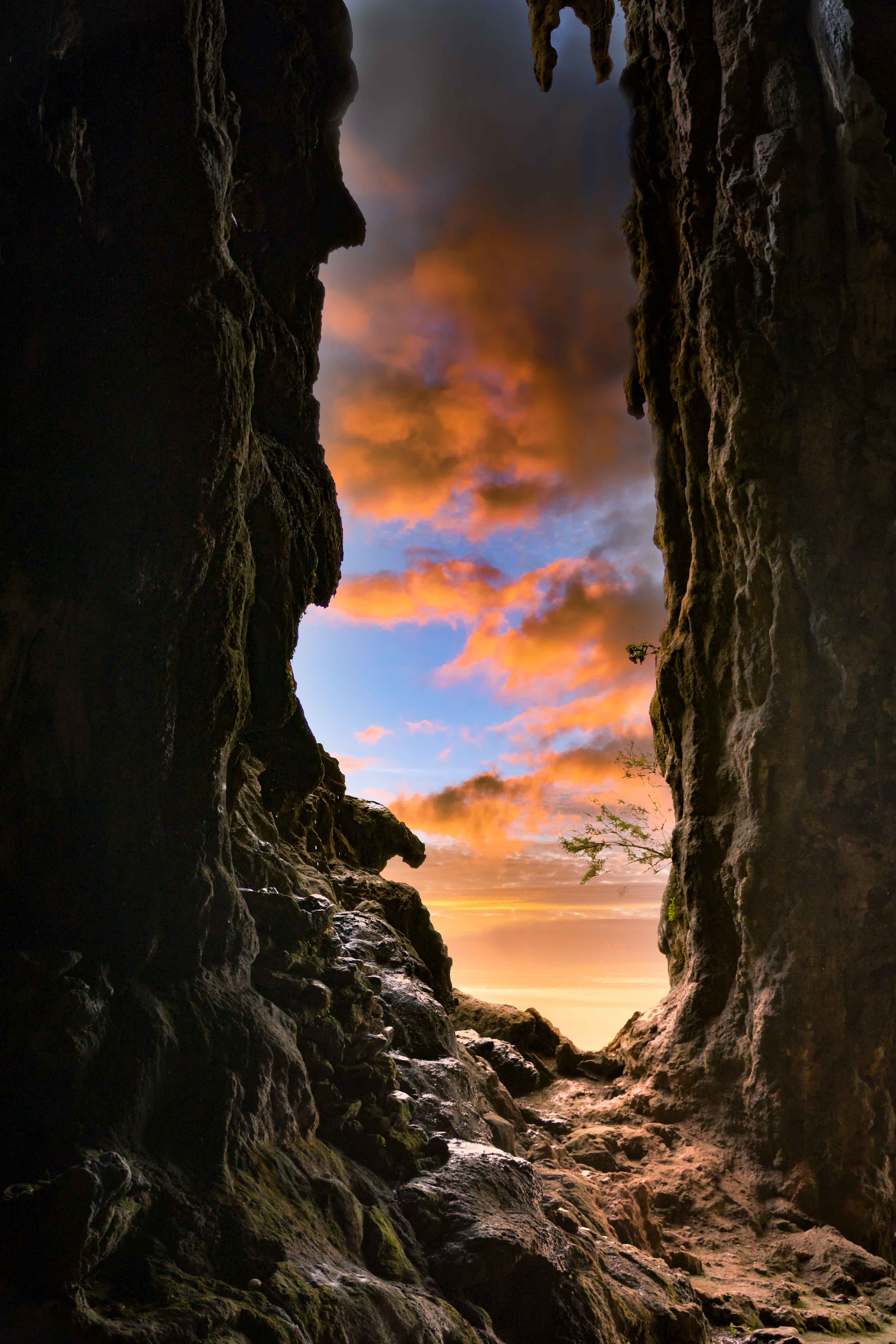

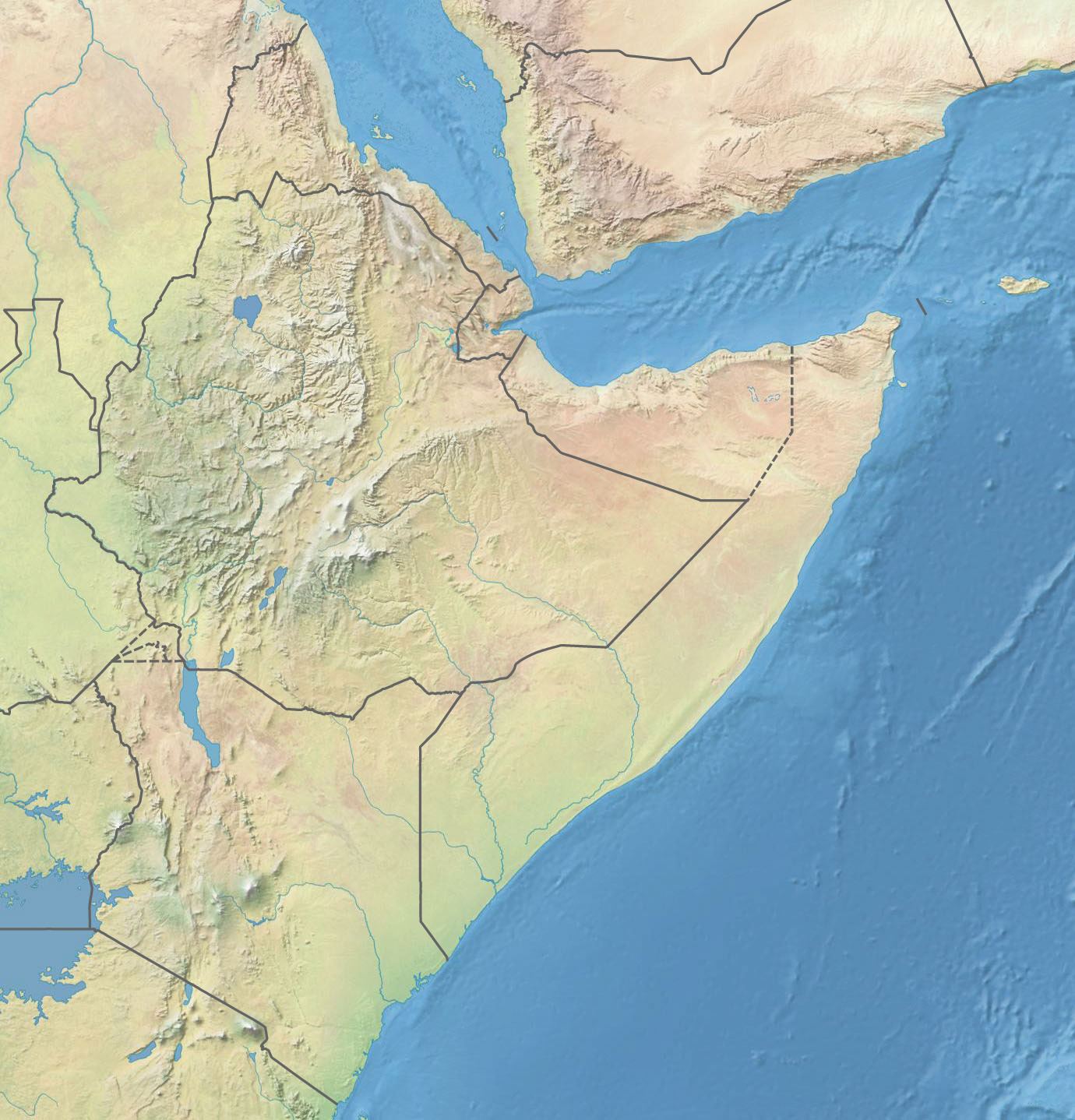
- Location on Socotra Hoq Cave (Horn of Africa)
- 12°35′11″N 54°21′15″E
- Location: Yemen
- Region: Socotra Archipelago

The Hoq Cave or Hawk Cave (Arabic: كهف حوق) is a limestone cave on the island of Socotra, Yemen. It is located in the Hala spot approximately 1.5 km from the north-eastern coast, facing the open sea to northeast. Clearly visible from the sea, but difficult to access, it is situated at an altitude of 350 m. The about-2-km-deep cave has a main passage with a mean width of 50 m and a mean height of 20 m. Sunlight reaches about 200 m from the entrance. The temperature is constant during the year and varies between 25 and 27 °C, with a humidity higher than 95%.

All sorts of speleothems, where numerous endemic troglobionts are living, can be found along the way into the cave.

A range of epigraphy from the 1st to the 6th century CE has been recorded in the back part of the cave, placing Socotra as a major hub in the overseas trading links in ancient times, where merchants from all coasts of the northern Indian Ocean were brought together.

== Protection ==
The cave is a protected area under the law. To conserve the cave, a pathway has been constructed. The end of the cave is still under study for future archaeological investigations. In some occasions visitors started to feel chest pain, and some even vomit after going a little deeper into the cave. It is unclear what is the cause of this.

== Description ==
In 2001, a group of Belgian speleologists from the Socotra Karst Project mapped and investigated the cave, finding numerous graffitis and drawings on speleothems and floors. Subsequent research concluded that they were the work of navigators or merchants who visited the island at the beginning of the first millennium. The corpus of inscriptions is in Indian Brahmi, South Arabic, Ethiopian Geʽez, Ancient Greek, Palmyrene, and Bactrian scripts. All the inscriptions are rather short, containing personal names, hometowns, professions, or ethnic and religious affiliations.

== Gallery of speleothems ==
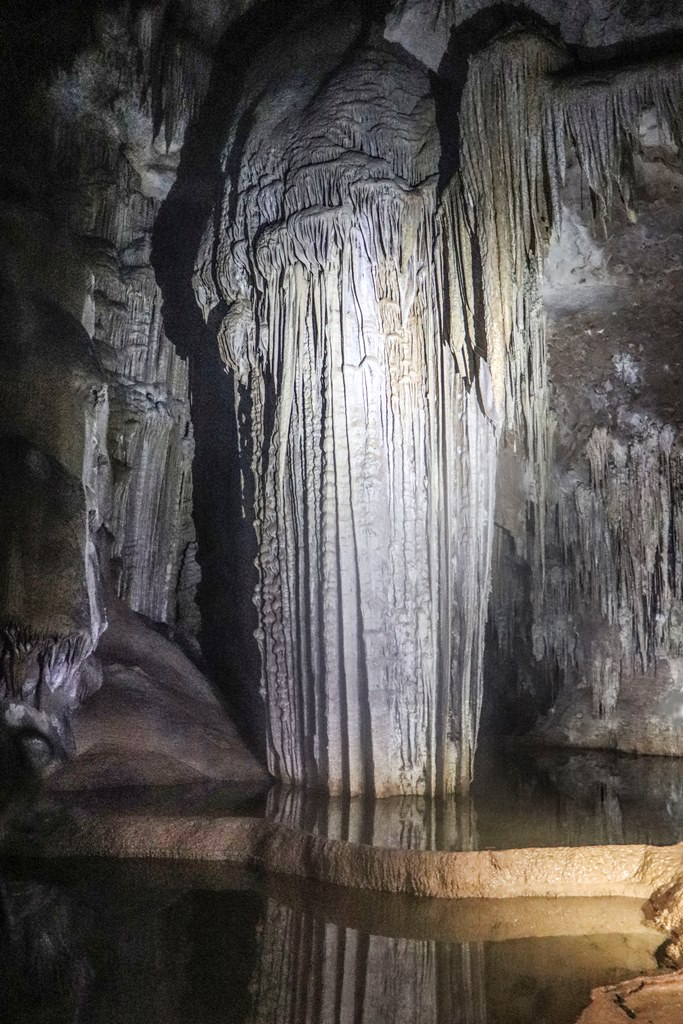

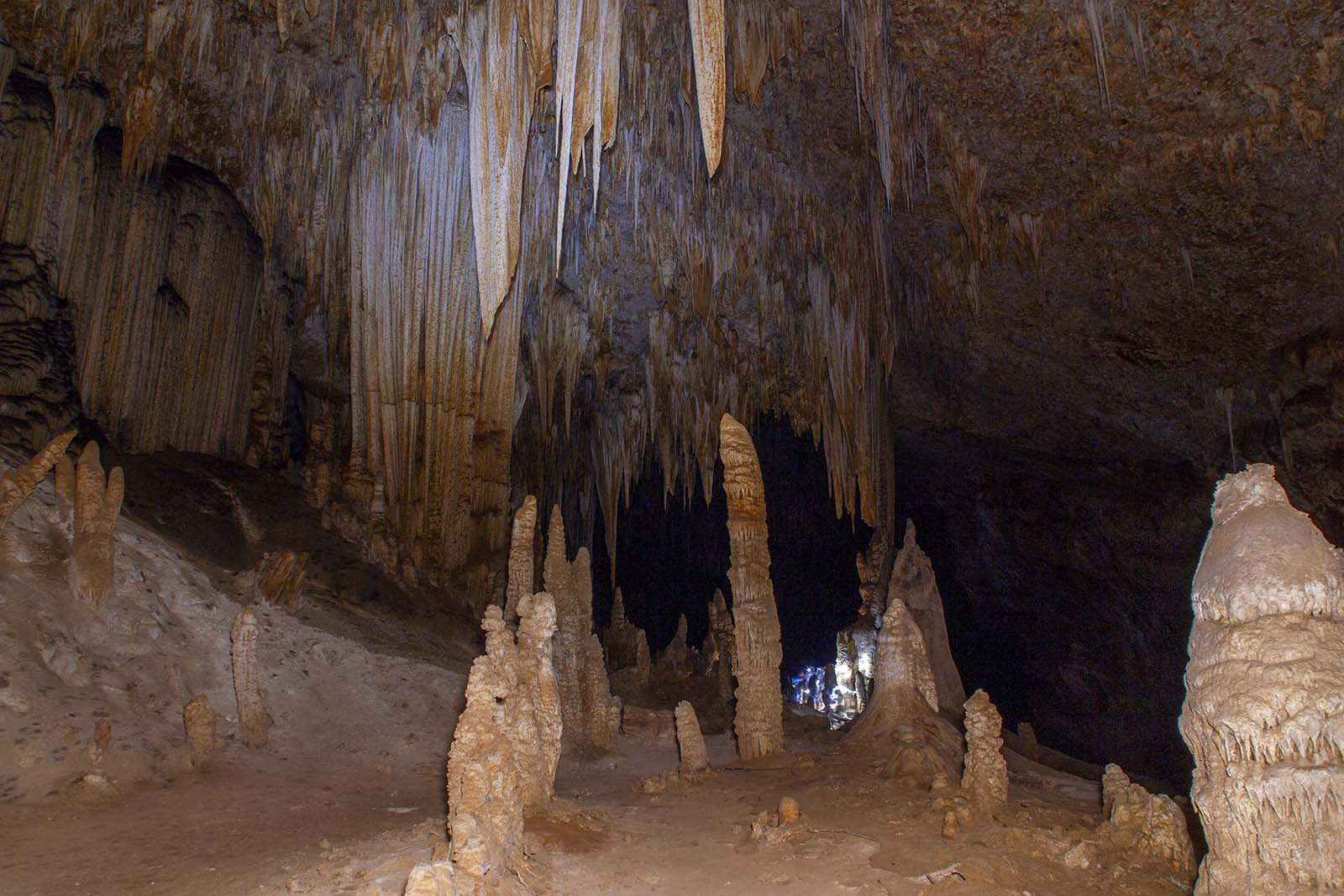

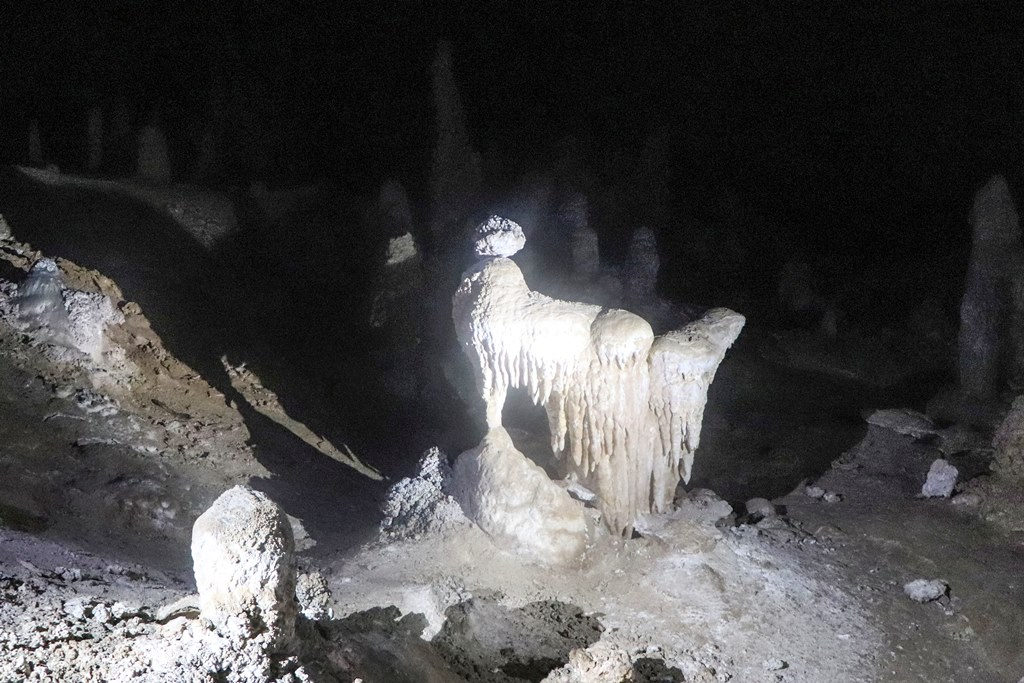

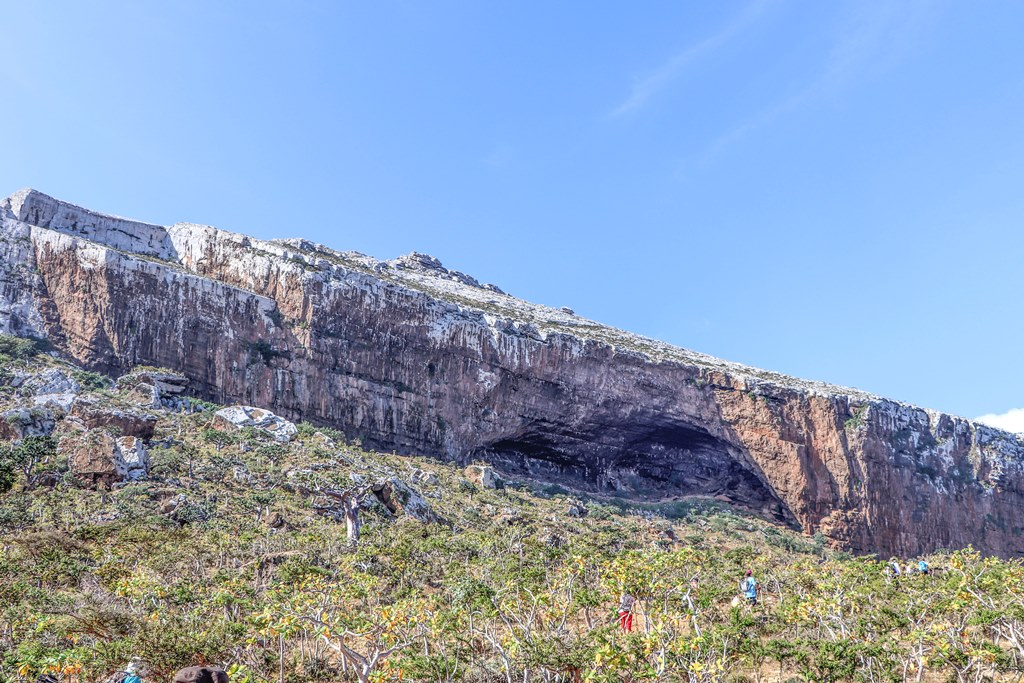

== See also ==
- Tablet De Geest
- History of Socotra
