= Gerrit De Geest =

Belgian legal scholar and writer

Gerrit Gaby Aimé De Geest (born 19 September 1960, Aalst, Belgium) is a Belgian legal scholar and writer specializing in contract law, law and economics, and comparative law.

He earned his J.D. in 1983, M.E. in 1986 and Ph.D. in 1993 from Ghent University. With Boudewijn Bouckaert, he was co-editor of Bibliography of law and economics (1992) and of the 5-volume Encyclopedia of Law and Economics. He is consultant editor of the European Review of Contract Law and general editor of the book series New Horizons in Law & Economics. He is a member of the European Group on an Integrated Contract Law, the Economic Impact Group of the Common Principles of European Contract Law, and past president of the European Association of Law and Economics (2001-2004). He was previously a Professor at Ghent University (1997-1999), University of Antwerp (1999-2000), and Utrecht University (2000-2009). He was a visiting teacher at Stockholm University and the Catholic University of Brussels. Since September 2009, he has been Professor of Law and Economics at Washington University School of Law at Washington University in St. Louis.

== Selected works ==
- Boudewijn Bouckaert and Gerrit De Geest, eds., Encyclopedia of Law and Economics (Edward Elgar, 2000)
- Boudewijn Bouckaert and Gerrit De Geest, Bibliography of law and economics, (Kluwer Academic Boston, 1992)
- Dari-Mattiacci, Giuseppe; Gerrit De Geest (2006). "When will judgment proof injurers take too much precaution?". International Review of Law and Economics. 26 (3): 336–354. doi:10.1016/j.irle.2006.11.005. hdl:1874/7388. S2CID 151187010.
