= Flake ice =

Type of ice

Flake ice is a loose definition of a group of ice types with irregular particle sizes. These types can be roughly grouped into two main types: scale ice and granular ice. This can cause confusion as different manufacturers, industries or even geographical areas will say flake ice and mean different things.

Mainly used in the process industries including bakeries, fish and meat packing, and in laboratories. Flake ice makers are used to preserve fish, and to control industrial reactions, such as concrete cooling.

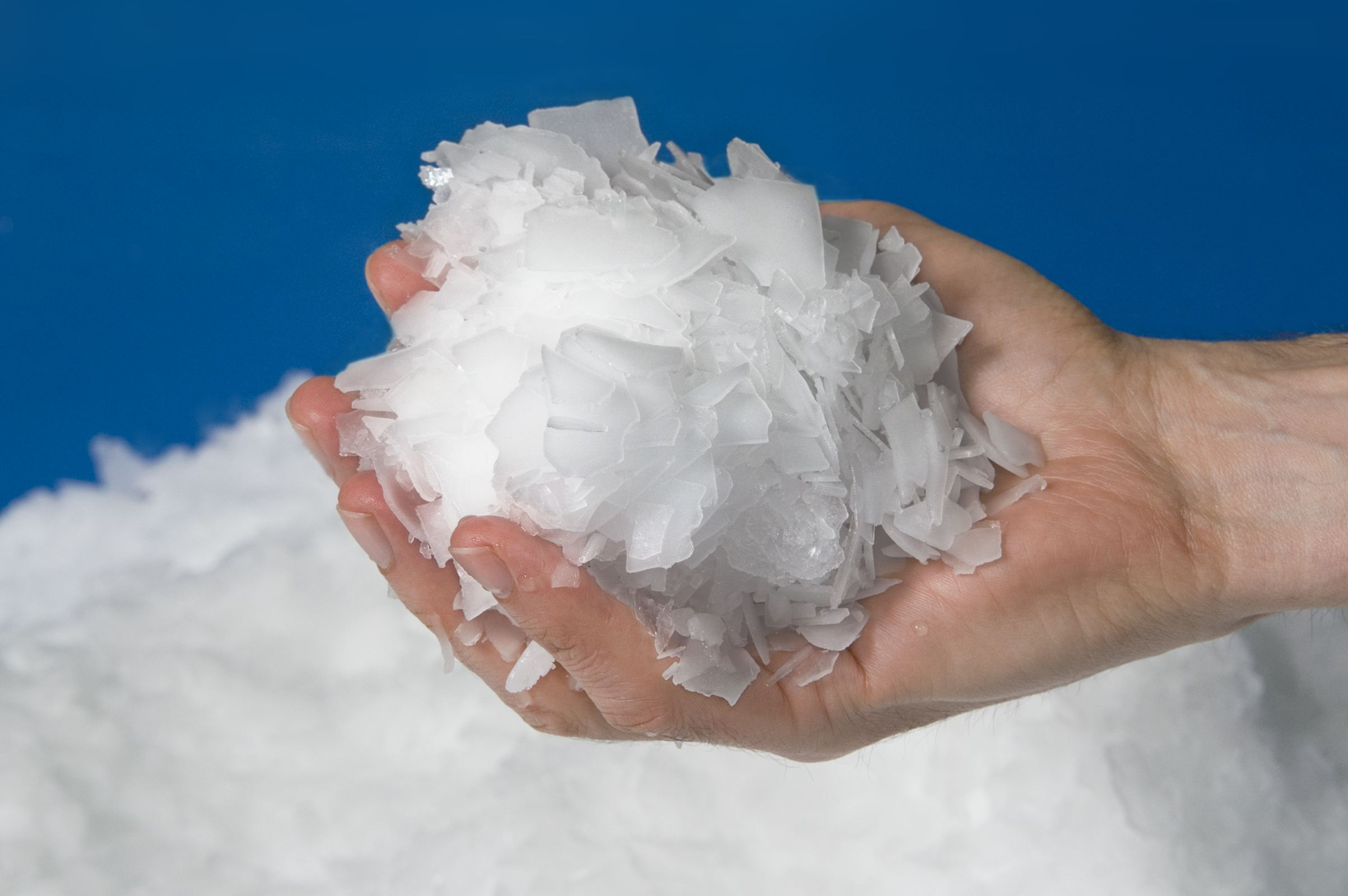
Flake ice

== Scale ice ==
Scale ice is usually large, flat, thin pieces of ice (1-2 mm) mainly used in the commercial fishing and concrete cooling industries, typically in large quantities.

Made on a large vertical or horizontal drums, scale ice is formed on either the inner or outer surface of the drum by pouring a film of water over it, then contact freezing it into a thin sheet of ice. This ice is sub-cooled down to −7 °C (19 °F) in order to make it brittle, then cracked off by a harvesting blade. The ice then falls by gravity into the ice store. These large, flat pieces are good for layering, and are available with a single evaporator up to 50 tonnes.

The vertical style of drum is usually stationary, with the ice formed on the inner surface. The harvesting blade is motor driven around this surface, cracking it off. The horizontal style of drum is usually rotating, with the ice formed on the outer surface. As the drum rotates, a stationary blade cracks the ice from the surface

As the ice is made at -7°C, it can be stored in freezers below zero for prolonged storage. However, this means that the ice is cold enough to condense and freeze moisture from the air and also re-freeze its own melt-water, thus forming lumps if not used quickly during periods of storage at ambient temperature. It is best stored below zero, but in some applications such as fishing it can be stored at +2°C for moderate lengths of time without too many problems.

It is mainly used in the fishing industry, particularly by processors with large ice requirements, and in the concrete industry where huge volumes are often required in hot climates, thus requiring cold storage.

Most scale ice machines are in the 5 tonne to 30 tonne range, below this they can be very expensive for their size, particularly in very small machines below a tonne. Larger machines up to 50 tonnes are also available, but can be physically large at these capacities.

== Granular ice ==
Granular ice can vary from very small pieces that look like coarse snow for rapid cooling and gentle packing, up to pieces 9 mm thick for extended storage in a warm environment. The small types are often called crushed ice, granular ice, fine ice, or micro ice. The middle and thick sizes are often called flake ice, chip ice, or granular ice. As these ice types are made in a scraped surface evaporator, they don't need to be subcooled to make them brittle, so are usually around -0.5°C to -1°C.

Most people are familiar with this type of ice due to its widespread use in retail fish sellers such as fishmongers and supermarkets. Machines are commonly available from 30 kg up to 1,500 kg, with some manufacturers producing machines up to 10 tonnes daily capacity.

Advantages: Available in different sizes to suit a wide range of applications; suitable for use in warm environments; does not freeze into lumps during prolonged storage above zero.

Disadvantages: Not economical when requirements are for above 15 tonnes; cannot be stored below zero. Ideal storage: +2°C to +10°C.

== Nomenclature ==
It can be very difficult when trying to compare machines as there is no agreed standard for naming them. The following are manufacturers that supply both types:

- Frosty Ice Ltd calls scale ice flake ice and granular ice chip ice
- Ice Systems calls scale ice flake ice and granular ice chip ice.
- Geneglace calls scale ice flake ice and granular ice granular ice.
- Snowkey calls scale ice flake ice and granular ice chip ice.
- Ziegra calls scale ice scale ice and granular ice chip ice.
- Scotsman calls scale ice scale ice and granular ice flake ice.
- Ice Power calls scale ice scale ice.
- Ice Cool Servicing calls scale ice scale ice and granular ice flake ice.
- Other manufactures who offer only one type generally call them all flake ice regardless of which type it is, thus rendering the term almost meaningless.

== See also ==
- Flake ice machine
- Shave ice
