= Tablet De Geest =

3rd-century tablet with Palmyrene writing found in Hoq Cave, Socotra, Yemen

The Tablet De Geest is a wooden tablet found in the Hoq Cave on the island of Socotra, in the Guardafui Channel off the tip of the Horn of Africa. The wooden tablet measures 50x20 cm and contains a Palmyrene inscription; it is dated to the third century AD, and is named for Peter De Geest, a Belgian caver who discovered it in 2000/2001.
