= Yemen Red Sea Ports Corporation =

Port authority in Yemen

Logo of the Yemen Red Sea Ports Corporation

The Yemeni Red Sea Ports Corporation (YRSPC) (Arabic: مؤسسة موانئ البحر الأحمر اليمنية) is a governmental institution that is responsible for managing Yemeni ports in the Red Sea.

== History ==
The YRSPC was established in 2007 by Republican Decree No. 63 of 2007 to manage key Yemeni ports and harbors in Hudeidah governorate, mainly Port of Hudaydah, Port of Mokha, and al-Salif Port.

== See also ==
- Yemen Gulf of Aden Ports Corporation
- Yemen Arabian Sea Ports Corporation
- Hudaydah Port
- Transport in Yemen
