= Yemen Arabian Sea Ports Corporation =

Logo of the Yemen Arabian Sea Ports Corporation

Yemen Arabian Sea Ports Corporation (YASPC) (Arabic: مؤسسة موانئ البحر العربي اليمنية) is a sovereign government corporation that supervises the management of Yemeni ports on the Arabian Sea of the Indian Ocean, mainly Port of Mukalla in Hadramawt, Port of Socotra, and Port of Nashtoon in al-Mahara. The YASPC was established on 28 April 2007 as part of the Ministry of Transport.

== See also ==
- Transport in Yemen
- Yemen Gulf of Aden Ports Corporation
- Yemen Red Sea Ports Corporation
- Dhabba Oil Terminal
- Port of Aden
