= Hodeidah Port =

Port in Yemen

Port of Hodeidah
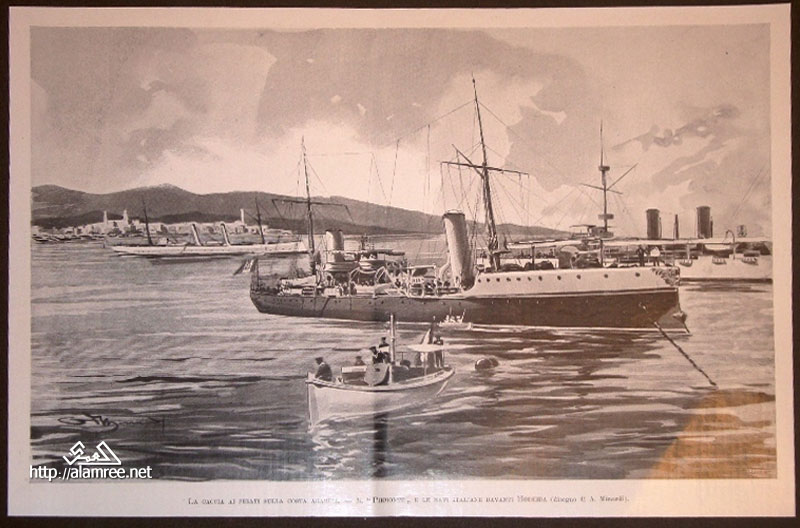
- Port of Hodeidah in 1902
- Interactive map of Port of Hodeidah
- Location within Yemen

Location
- Country: Yemen
- Location: Hodeidah
- Coordinates: 14°50′N 42°54′E
- UN/LOCODE: YEHOD

Details
- Opened: 1961
- Operated by: Yemen Red Sea Ports Corporation
- No. of berths: 10
- Draft depth: Depth 11.0 metres (36.1 ft)

Statistics
- Website www.yrspc.net

Hodeidah Port (also Hudaydah) is a major Yemeni port on the Red Sea coast, located 4 kilometres (2.5 mi) west of Hodeidah, the fourth-largest city in Yemen (as of January 2016). The port handles up to 80% of the humanitarian supplies, fuel and commercial goods in northern Yemen.

What was then the second-largest port on the Arabian Peninsula was captured by the rebel Houthis in October 2014 in the opening stages of the Yemeni civil war, and remains in their possession despite attempts by the Yemeni government, Saudi Arabia and a Saudi-led coalition to recover it, for example in June 2018.

== Capacity ==
It possesses eight berths that can handle ships up to 200 metres (660 ft) length overall and a maximum deadweight tonnage of 30,000 tons. Berths 1-5 are for general cargo, with drafts ranging from 6 to 10 metres (20 to 33 ft); berths 6 and 7 are for container ships and general cargo, with drafts of 10 metres (33 ft) (August 2015 airstrikes destroyed five cranes, so for loading and unloading containers as of 2016, rented or ship's cranes must be used); and berth 8 is for small vessels.

The draft alongside the berths varies from berth to berth, but is at most 9.75 metres (32.0 ft).

== History ==
=== Beginnings ===
It has operated since the 19th century, when the region was part of the Ottoman Empire.

=== Yemeni civil war (2014–present) ===
==== Battle for the port ====
In 2014, the Houthis seized the port. Since then, the Saudi-led coalition, the internationally recognized government of Yemen and Israel have repeatedly accused the Houthis of using the port to receive arms from Iran.

In June 2018, the Saudi-led coalition launched the Battle of Hodeidah, led by the United Arab Emirates, to try to retake the port. Despite the conflict, the United Nations' World Food Programme raced "to unload three ships containing enough food for six million people for one month".

In May 2019, despite a ceasefire and a negotiated troop withdrawal, fighting resumed.

In May 2022, as part of a truce that went into force on 2 April, Saudi-led blockading forces permitted a ship transporting cooking gas and a week later two ships carrying diesel to unload at the port.

On 23 February 2023, a general cargo ship docked at the port, the first since at least 2016, as negotiations resumed to renew the truce that had expired in October.

==== 2024 airstrikes ====
On 20 July 2024, in response to an Iran-made drone attack which struck a block of residential buildings in Tel Aviv, Israeli air strikes targeted a power generating station, an oil refinery, and fuel storage facilities. On 29 September, the Israeli Air Force attacked the port again following a Houthi ballistic attack which impacted at Israel's main airport, Ben Gurion Airport. In December, Israel conducted two waves of airstrikes on the port within a week as a response to Houthi attacks targeting population centers in Israel.

== See also ==
- FSO Safer
- Yemen Red Sea Ports Corporation
- Yemen Gulf of Aden Ports Corporation
- Yemen Arabian Sea Ports Corporation
- Port of Aden
