= Yemen Gulf of Aden Ports Corporation =

Port authority in Yemen

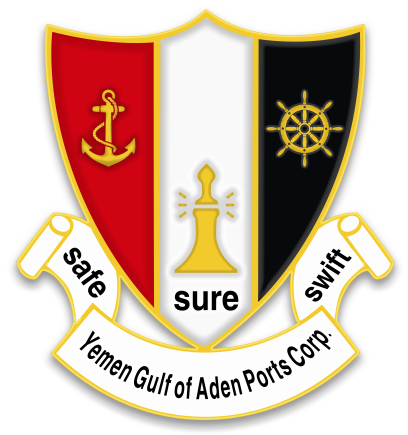
Logo of the Yemen Gulf of Aden Ports Corporation

Yemen Gulf of Aden Ports Corporation is a government corporation that governs and manages the Yemeni ports and harbors in Aden. The corporation was established on 21 April 2007.

== Port of Aden ==
Geographically the Port of Aden consists of three areas: the outer harbour which provides anchorage, the oil harbor and the inner harbor.

Usage zones at Aden consist of:

- Ma'alla Multipurpose and Container Terminal
- Aden Container Terminal
- Oil Harbour
- Fishing Harbour

The Aden Refinery Company is located at the oil harbor at Aden port; its operations include transshipment of petroleum products, oil refining and marine fuel station.

== See also ==
- Economy of Yemen
- Government of Yemen
- Gulf of Aden
- Port authority
- Port operator
- Transport in Yemen
- Yemen Arabian Sea Ports Corporation
- Yemen Red Sea Ports Corporation
