= Port of Aden =

Port in Yemen

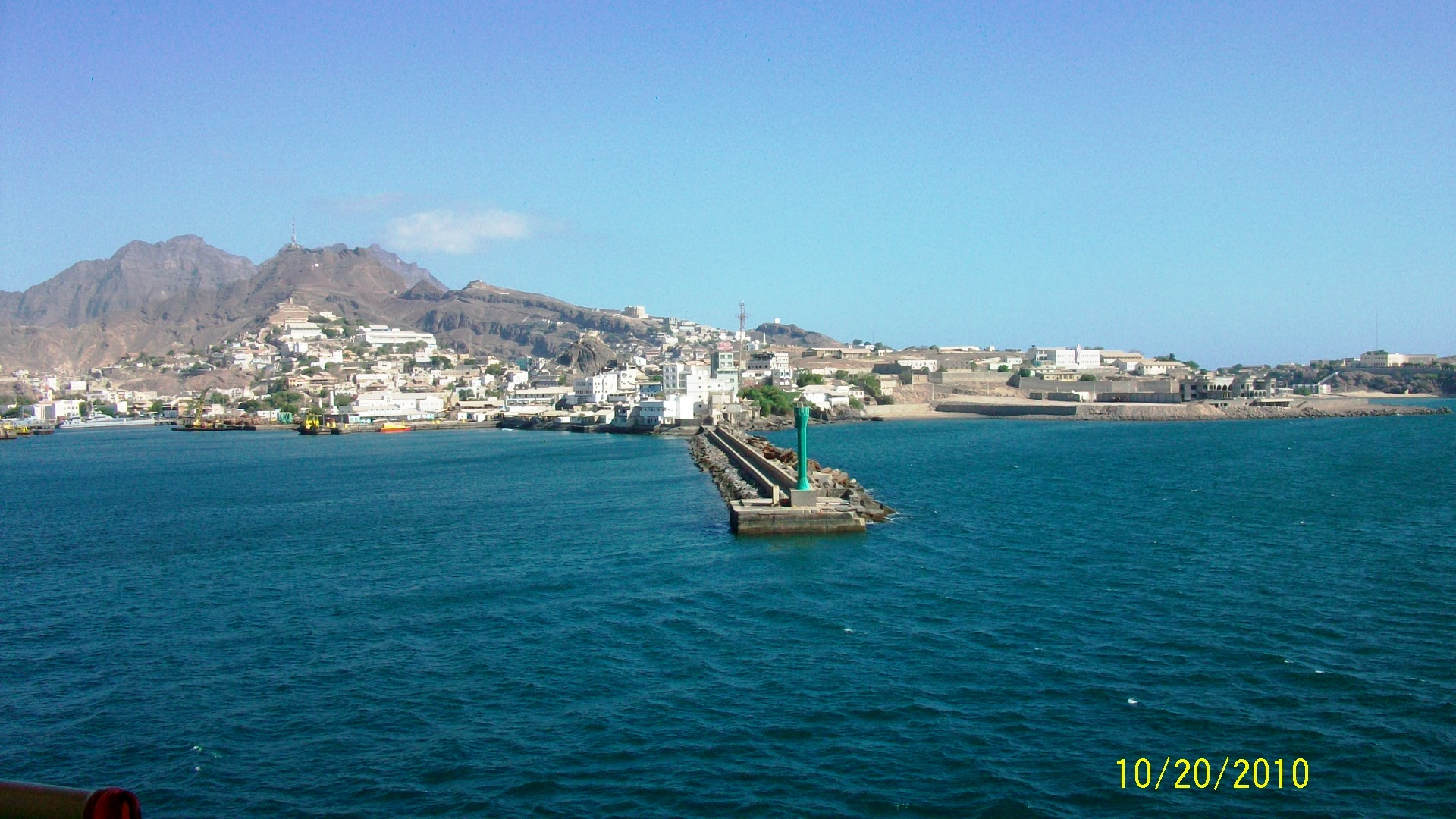
- Interactive map of Port of Aden
- Location within Yemen

Location
- Country: Yemen
- Location: Aden
- Coordinates: 12.7912°N 44.9855°E

Details
- Operated by: Yemen Gulf of Aden Ports Corporation

Statistics
- Website https://www.portofaden.net/en

The Port of Aden is a seaport situated in Aden, Yemen, on the Gulf of Aden. It is the largest and one of the most important ports in the country, serving as a major gateway for maritime trade and the import of commercial and humanitarian goods. The port comprises several facilities, including the Aden Container Terminal, Ma'alla Multipurpose Terminal, the Oil Harbour, and Aden Gulf Terminal. Its strategic location near the Bab al-Mandeb Strait, at the entrance to the Red Sea, has historically made it an important stopping point for international shipping routes connecting Europe, Asia, and East Africa.

== Location ==
The Port of Aden is situated approximately 170 kilometers (110 mi) east of the Bab al-Mandeb Strait, which connects the Gulf of Aden to the Red Sea. It occupies a naturally sheltered harbour between the promontories of Aden, dominated by Jebel Shamsan, and Little Aden, where Jebel Muzalqam forms the western side of the bay. These elevated landforms provide protection from the northeast and southwest monsoon winds, allowing the harbour to accommodate maritime traffic throughout the year.

The harbour extends approximately eight nautical miles from east to west and three nautical miles from north to south. It consists of three principal areas: the outer harbour, which provides anchorage for vessels; the inner harbour, which accommodates general cargo and container terminals; and the oil harbour at Little Aden, on the western side of the bay. The different harbour areas are connected to the sea by an approach channel entering between the two promontories.

The port is one of the largest natural harbours in the world. Its geographical position near one of the principal maritime routes between the Indian Ocean and the Mediterranean Sea has contributed to its historical importance as a commercial and refuelling station. During the 1950s, it was among the world's busiest ports for ship bunkering, ranking second after New York City according to the port authority.

== History ==
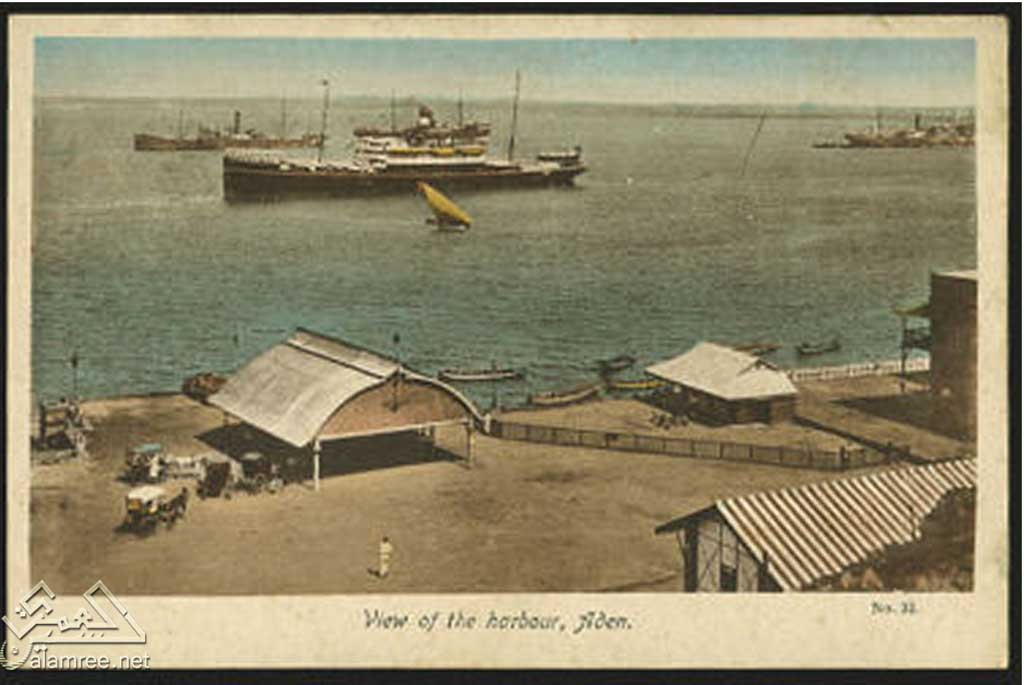
Port of Aden in 1890–1900

Aden has been an important maritime trading centre since antiquity, owing to its position along the sea routes connecting the Indian Ocean with the Red Sea and the Mediterranean. Its harbour was used by successive regional trading powers, and the city developed as a commercial centre linking the Arabian Peninsula with East Africa, India and other parts of the Indian Ocean world.

During the nineteenth century, the harbour became increasingly important as a coaling and provisioning station for steamships travelling between Europe and Asia. The British occupation of Aden in 1839 was partly motivated by its strategic position along the maritime route to India and the need to establish a secure station for British shipping. The opening of the Suez Canal in 1869 further increased the port's importance by shortening the maritime route between Europe and the Indian Ocean. Aden subsequently developed into a major centre for coal supplies, maritime services and commercial exchange.

Ma'alla became the principal commercial port of Aden in 1864, replacing the earlier harbour at the front bay in Crater, which was more exposed to monsoon conditions. During the following decades, the port expanded its facilities to accommodate increasing maritime traffic and larger vessels. Cargo was transferred between ships and shore facilities using barges, while coastal vessels and traditional dhows maintained connections with regional ports around the Arabian Peninsula, East Africa and the Indian Ocean.

The port reached a period of considerable commercial prominence during the first half of the twentieth century. Its activities included the provision of coal, water and other supplies to ships, as well as duty-free trade and the handling of cargo between regional and international markets. The development of oil bunkering during the twentieth century gradually supplemented the earlier coal trade, further strengthening Aden's role as a refuelling station on international shipping routes.

The Aden Refinery Company and the associated oil harbour were constructed during the mid-1950s to receive and refine imported crude oil and supply different grades of fuel to ships calling at the port. The facilities supported Aden's development as a major bunkering centre between Europe, the Indian subcontinent and the Far East.

Following the establishment of the People's Republic of South Yemen in 1967 and the subsequent formation of the People's Democratic Republic of Yemen in 1970, the port continued to serve as the nation's primary maritime gateway. New quays were constructed during the 1980s to accommodate developments in international shipping and the increasing use of containerised cargo.

In the 1990s, the port underwent further modernisation with the development of a dedicated container terminal. The Aden Container Terminal was officially opened in 1999, providing facilities for handling domestic, export and transshipment containers. Its development was intended to strengthen Aden's position as a regional maritime hub and enable it to compete for international container traffic.

The port was severely disrupted by the Yemeni Civil War. Navigation was suspended in March 2015 amid the fighting in Aden, and the port remained closed for approximately four months. It resumed operations in July 2015, receiving vessels carrying humanitarian assistance and commercial cargo. The Aden Container Terminal was reported to have remained undamaged during the conflict, although other port facilities sustained damage.

Despite the resumption of maritime traffic, the conflict continued to affect the port's infrastructure and operational capacity. In 2021, the United Nations Development Programme launched a project to improve the efficiency of the port, including the refurbishment of damaged transit sheds at Ma'alla and the introduction of handheld communication equipment at the Aden Container Terminal to improve cargo tracking and handling procedures.

Following the outbreak of the Red Sea crisis in late 2023, Houthi attacks on commercial shipping disrupted maritime traffic through the Red Sea and the Gulf of Aden, prompting some shipping companies to reroute vessels and increasing transport and insurance costs. In March 2024, Aden became the location of the United Nations Verification and Inspection Mechanism for shipments bound for government-controlled Yemeni ports, following its relocation from Jeddah. The port consequently retained an important role in the country's import supply chain, although shipping disruptions and higher freight costs continued to affect its operations in 2026.

== Port facilities ==
The Port of Aden consists of several specialised terminals and harbour facilities operated or managed by different entities under the overall administration of the Yemen Gulf of Aden Ports Corporation. These facilities handle containerised cargo, general and bulk cargo, petroleum products, livestock, and other maritime traffic.

=== Ma'alla Multipurpose Terminal ===
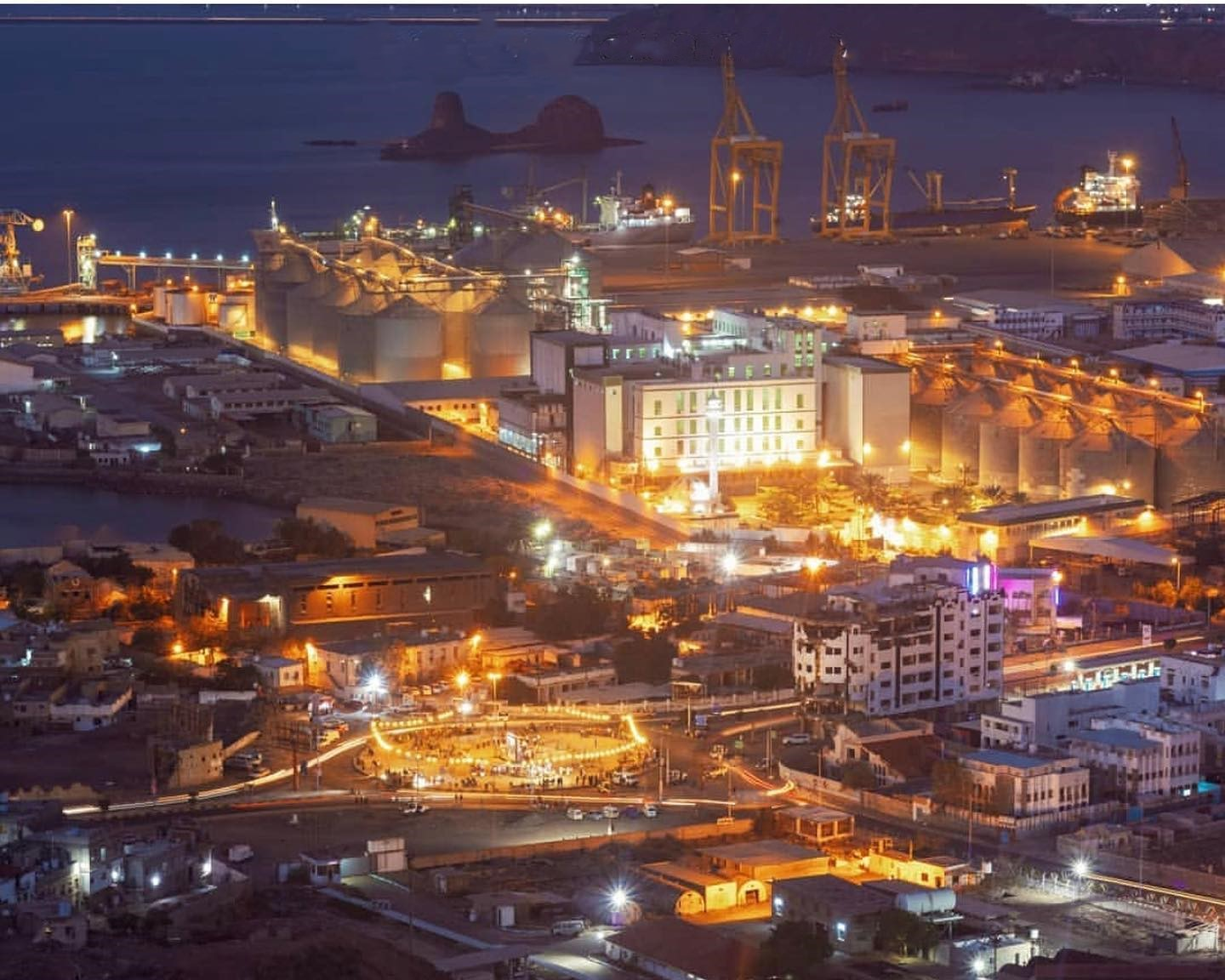
Ma'alla harbour

The Ma'alla Multipurpose Terminal is one of the principal general cargo facilities of the port. Historically, Ma'alla developed from an area associated with traditional boatbuilding into a commercial harbour serving sailing vessels and small steamships. It became the main port of the Aden colony in 1864 and was subsequently expanded to accommodate modern maritime traffic.

The terminal includes four principal berths, numbered 1 to 4, with a combined quay length of 750 metres and an alongside depth of approximately 11 metres. It also has a roll-on/roll-off berth, two berths for coastal vessels and dhows, and additional quays for smaller craft. The facilities accommodate general cargo, bulk commodities and containerised shipments, as well as vessels engaged in regional coastal trade.

Berths 1 and 2 have been used for container handling, while berths 3 and 4 primarily handle general and bulk cargo. The terminal is equipped with cargo sheds, storage areas, mobile harbour cranes, and facilities for unloading grain and cement. Its infrastructure includes grain silos with a storage capacity of approximately 50,000 tonnes and installations for the discharge, storage and bagging of bulk cement.

=== Aden Container Terminal ===
The Aden Container Terminal (ACT) is located on the northern shore of the inner harbour and is the principal dedicated container facility at the port. It was officially opened in 1999 and handles import, export, and transshipment containers. Since 20 September 2012, it has been managed and operated by the Aden Ports Development Company (APDC).

The terminal has approximately 710 metres of quay with an alongside depth of 16 metres at chart datum. Its facilities include ship-to-shore gantry cranes and container storage areas, enabling it to accommodate large container vessels. The terminal is designed to handle container ships of up to 350 metres in length overall and provides services for the movement of containers between ships, storage yards and land transport networks.

The terminal was previously operated by several international port operators, including PSA International, P&O Ports and DP World, before management was transferred to APDC in 2012.

=== Oil Harbour ===
The Oil Harbour is situated at Little Aden, on the western side of the port area, and is associated with the Aden Refinery Company. Its development during the mid-1950s was closely connected with the expansion of the petroleum industry in Aden and the port's role as a major ship-refuelling station.

The facility includes dedicated berths for oil tankers, as well as installations for handling liquefied petroleum gas (LPG), dry cargo and roll-on/roll-off vessels. Its tanker berths are connected to shore-based storage and refinery facilities through pipelines, allowing the import of crude oil and the loading and export of refined petroleum products.

Before 2015, the refinery handled substantial quantities of crude oil and refined petroleum products for domestic consumption and export. Since 2015, its maritime activities have primarily involved the handling of imports and exports of refined petroleum products.

=== Aden Gulf Terminal ===
The Aden Gulf Terminal (AGT) is a privately operated bulk cargo facility located near Ma'alla on the southern side of the inner harbour. It was established by the Hayel Saeed Anam Group through the Aden Gulf Maritime Company, which was founded in 2004. The terminal received its first vessel in March 2006.

The terminal consists of a jetty with two berths and was developed primarily to accommodate large bulk carriers transporting grain, particularly wheat, for nearby storage silos and flour mills. Its facilities also handle other bulk commodities, including coal, clinker and construction materials. The installation of mechanical unloading equipment enables grain to be transferred directly from ships to storage facilities through conveyor systems.

=== Fishing Harbour ===
The port area also includes facilities for fishing vessels and smaller maritime craft. These facilities serve local fishing activities and form part of the wider maritime infrastructure of Aden.

== Operations ==
The Port of Aden provides a range of maritime and cargo-handling services, including vessel berthing, pilotage, towage, cargo loading and unloading, bunkering, anchorage and storage. The Yemen Gulf of Aden Ports Corporation is responsible for the overall administration of the port and the operation of several of its facilities, while specialised terminals are managed by separate companies, including the Aden Ports Development Company and Aden Gulf Maritime Company.

Although cargo handling has become the principal commercial activity of the port, Aden continues to provide bunkering services to vessels calling at the inner harbour. These services are supplied through dedicated bunkering berths connected by pipelines to shore-based fuel storage facilities. The operations are carried out by the Ports Corporation and the Aden Bunkering Department, a branch of the Aden Refinery Company. Additional facilities are available for oil storage and blending through privately operated installations.

The port also provides anchorage areas for vessels awaiting berthing or other services. Pilotage and tug assistance are available for ships entering and leaving the harbour, while cargo-handling operations are supported by storage yards, warehouses, cranes and specialised unloading equipment.

== Economic importance ==
The Port of Aden has historically played an important role in the economy of the city and Yemen as a whole. Its location along international shipping routes has supported maritime trade, petroleum-related activities, regional commerce and the movement of goods between Yemen and overseas markets. The port also serves as an important entry point for imported food, fuel, construction materials and other essential commodities.

The port's significance increased during the twentieth century as Aden developed into a major bunkering and trading centre. Its facilities for refuelling ships, handling cargo and providing duty-free commercial services contributed to the city's economic expansion and its integration into international maritime networks.

In 2018, the port handled more than four million tonnes of bulk, break-bulk and general cargo, representing its highest recorded cargo throughput in seven years, according to the Yemen Gulf of Aden Ports Corporation.

The port's role in humanitarian logistics has also become increasingly important during the Yemeni conflict. It serves as a major entry point for humanitarian and commercial shipments destined for southern and other parts of the country, including food supplies, fuel, and construction materials.

== See also ==
- Yemen Gulf of Aden Ports Corporation
- Gulf of Aden
- Hudaydah Port
