= Somali rock gecko =

There are two species of gecko named Somali rock gecko:

- Pristurus somalicus
- Pristurus phillipsii
