= Qulensya wa Abd al Kuri district =

Qulensya Wa Abd Al Kuri District مديرية قلنسية وعبد الكوري
- District
- Qulensya Wa Abd Al Kuri is the western district of Socotra, and includes the island of Abd al Kuri and the remaining islands of the archipelago
- Country: Yemen
- Governorate: Socotra

Population (2003)
  - Total: 10,109
- Time zone: UTC+3 (Yemen Standard Time)

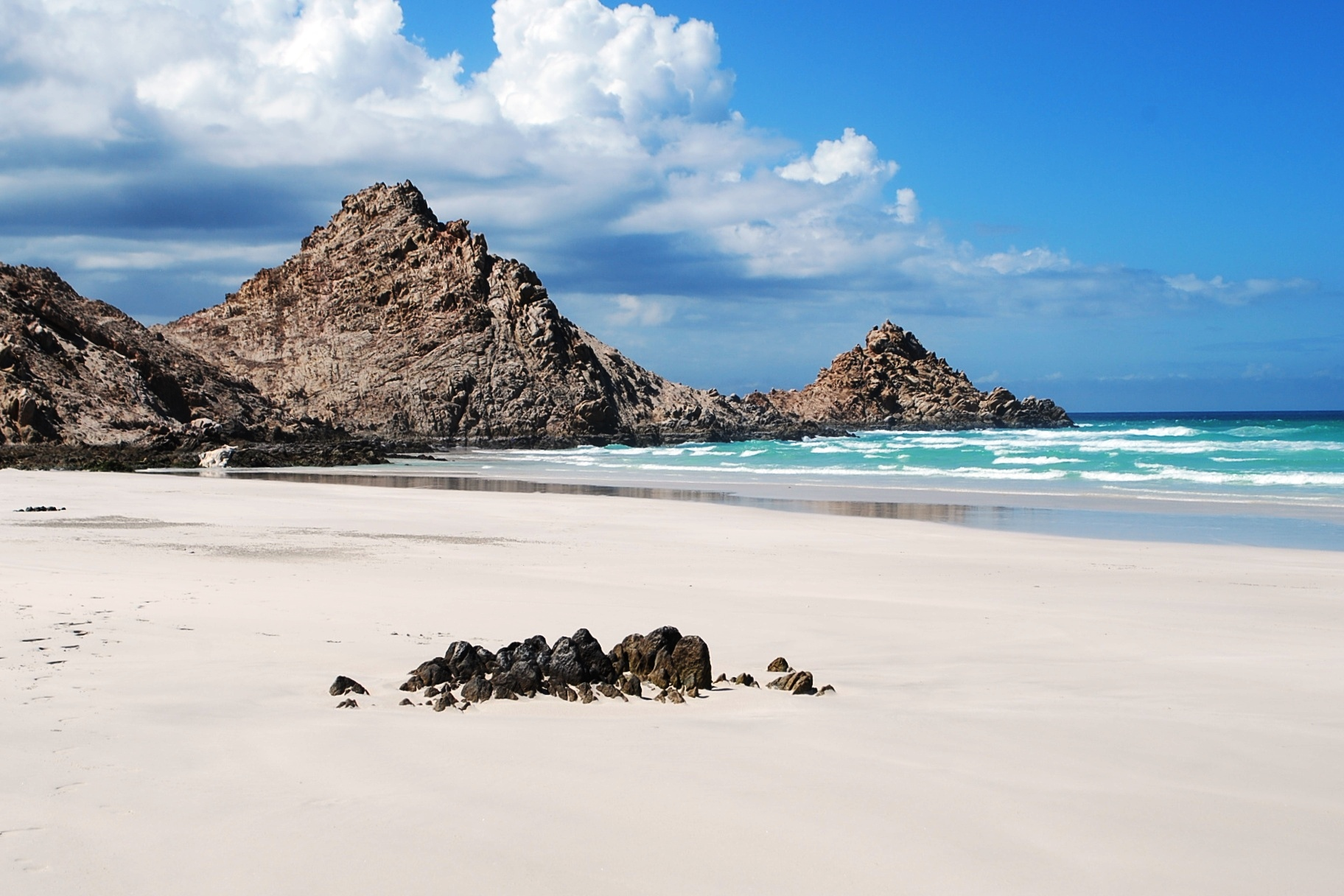
Detwah Lagoon in Qulensya

Qulensya Wa Abd Al Kuri District (Arabic: مديرية قلنسية وعبد الكوري) is one of two districts of the Socotra Governorate, Yemen. It occupies the western part of the main island of Socotra archipelago, and all other islands of the archipelago. It is named after its capital, Qulensya, on the north coast of Socotra island, and Abd al Kuri, the second largest island of the archipelago. As of 2003, the district had a population of 10,109 inhabitants.
