= Henry Ogg Forbes =

Scottish explorer and naturalist (1851–1932)

Henry Ogg Forbes FRGS FZS
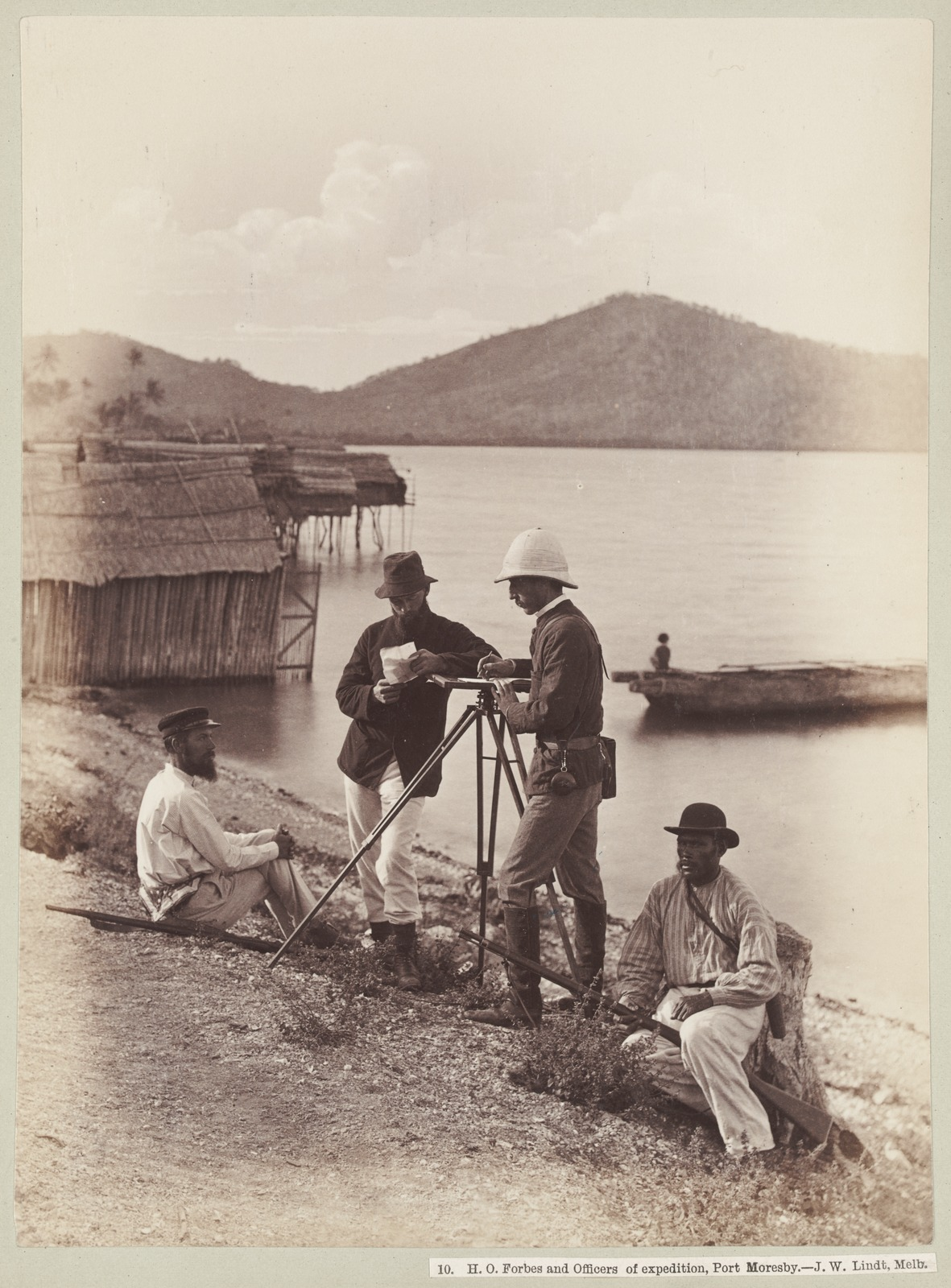
- H. O. Forbes and officers of expedition, Port Moresby [1885] J. W. Lindt State Library Victoria H42423
- Born: 30 January 1851
- Died: 27 October 1932 (aged 81)
- Occupations: Museum Director; Author; Explorer; Naturalist
- Spouse: Annabella Keith

Henry Ogg Forbes (30 January 1851 – 27 October 1932) was a Scottish explorer, ornithologist, and botanist. He also described a new species of spider, Thomisus decipiens.

== Biography ==
Forbes was the son of Rev Alexander Forbes M.A. (1821–1897), and his wife Mary née Ogg (1820–1862), and was born at Drumblade, Huntly, Aberdeenshire.

Henry was educated at Aberdeen Grammar School, he then studied medicine at the University of Aberdeen and the University of Edinburgh, An eye injury forced him to abandon his studies and he did not graduate. From 1875 he began collecting scientific samples: firstly in Portugal and from 1878 to 1884 he made extensive collections in the Dutch East Indies.

Forbes was active primarily in the Moluccas, Sumatra and New Guinea. His unusual tasks there also included tracking down the murderers of Captain J. C. Craig on Joannet Island in his temporary capacity as a government agent. In 1887 he was appointed meteorological observer at Port Moresby in New Guinea and used this opportunity to attempt further exploration of the island interior. The map he made from these explorations was deemed "unreliable" and he was not paid for his efforts. Disgruntled he decided to return to Britain. However he made a major stay in New Zealand before achieving this.

He was director of the Canterbury Museum in New Zealand between 1890 and 1893, and eventually moved to Liverpool, England, where he served as a consulting director of museums until his death.

Forbes coordinated and led the Liverpool and British Museums joint expedition to Socotra and Abd al Kuri in 1898–1899.

Henry Ogg Forbes dedicated his book A Naturalist's Wanderings in the Eastern Archipelago to the zoologist William Alexander Forbes, who died on an expedition to West Africa in 1883. They had been friends and classmate at the University of Edinburgh. Forbes is mentioned in A Short History of Nearly Everything by Bill Bryson.

He died in Selsey in Sussex on 27 October 1932.

== Family ==
His older brother George Stuart Forbes (1849–1940) came to fame in the Indian Civil Service and was knighted for these services.

Henry married Annabella Keith in Batavia in 1882. Keith travelled extensively with her husband, assisting him with his collections and writing several books relating to their travels as well as contributing to scientific research, particularly on bird species.

== Legacy ==
Henry Ogg Forbes is commemorated in the scientific names of three species of reptiles: Hemidactylus forbesii, Oligodon forbesi, and Sphenomorphus forbesi. Botanical specimens collected by Forbes are cared for at multiple herbaria, including the National Herbarium of Victoria (MEL), Royal Botanic Gardens Victoria.

== Gallery ==
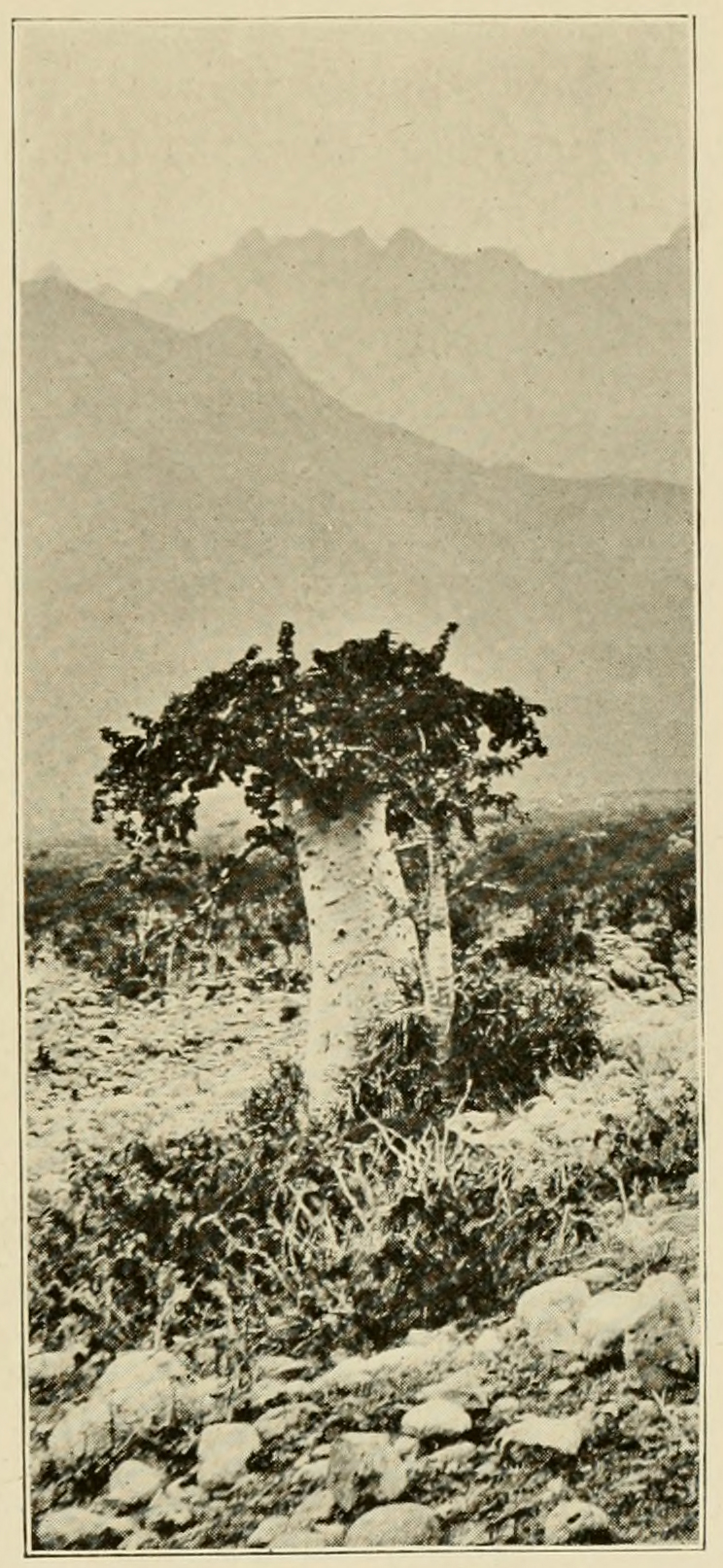
Cucumber tree (Dendrosicyos socotranus) photograph by Forbes

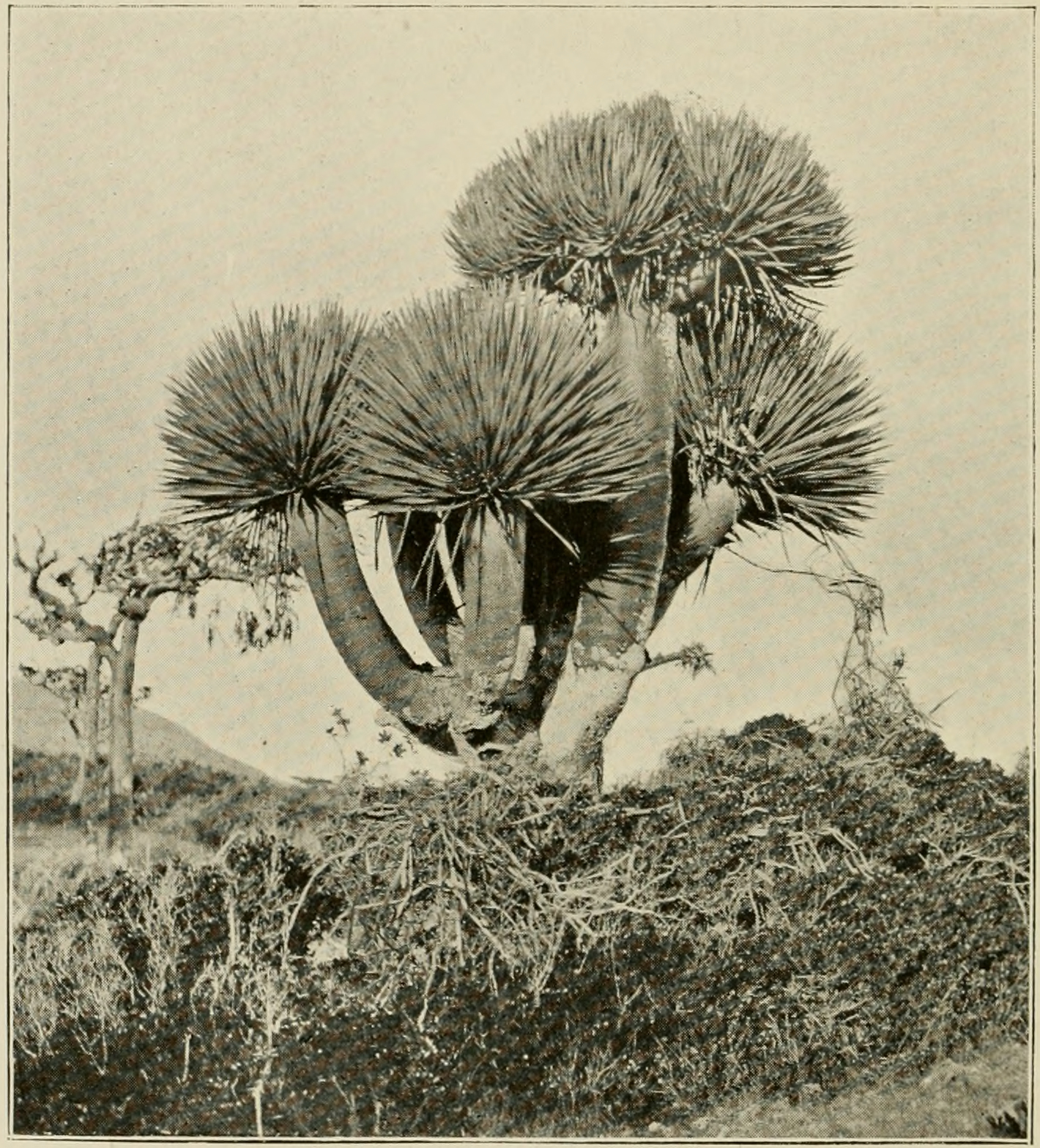
Dragon's blood tree (Dracaena cinnabari ) photograph by Forbes

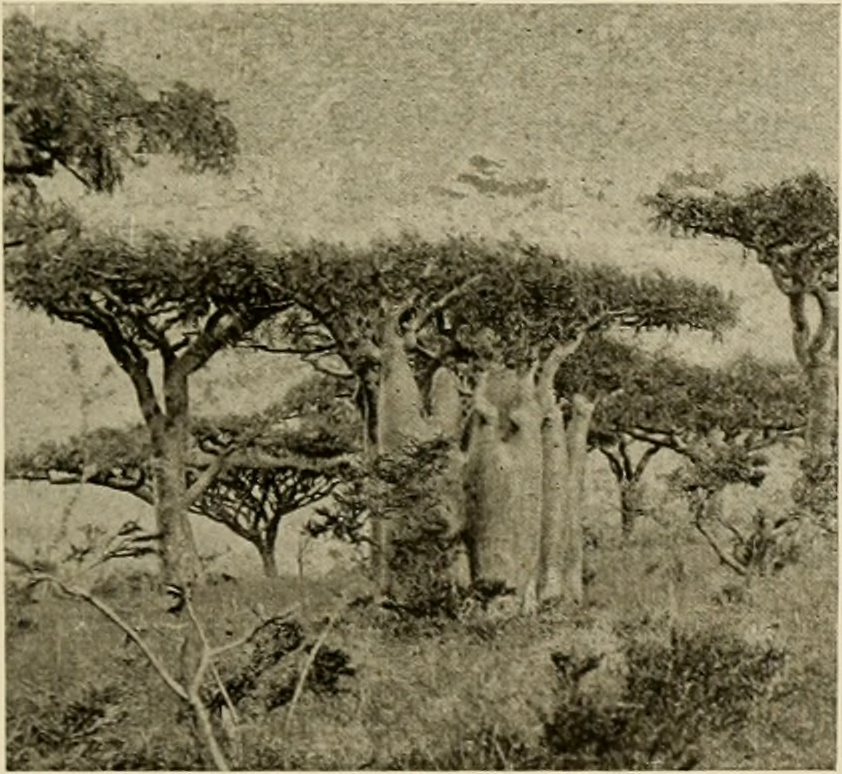
Frankincense and Adenium trees photograph by Forbes

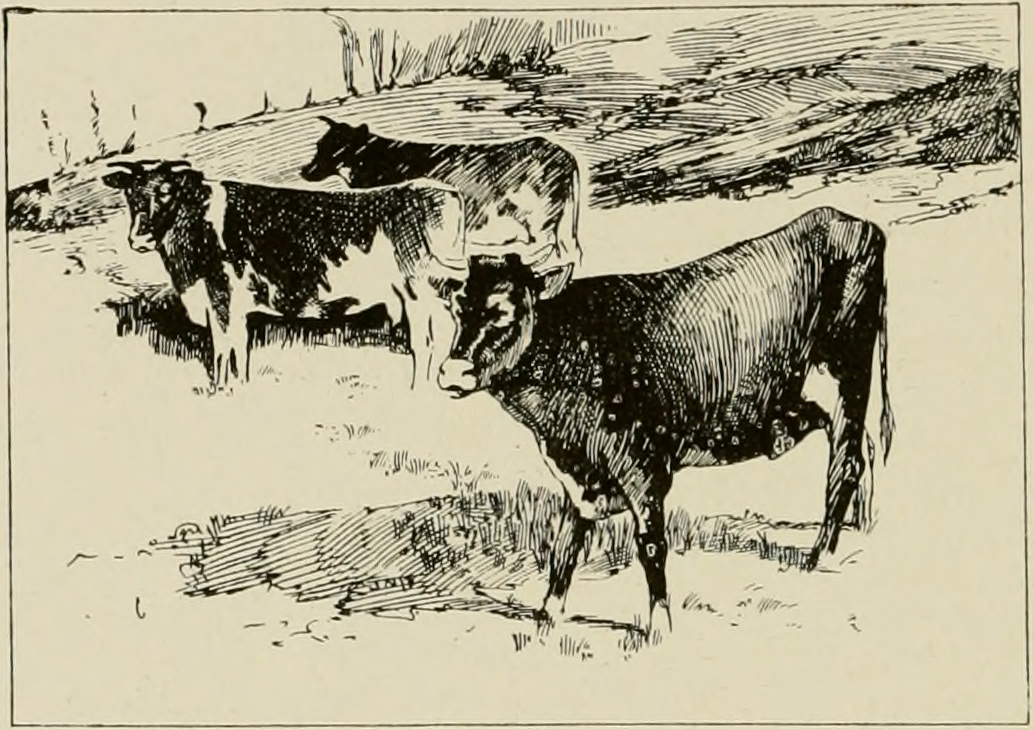
Cattle in Socotra, based on a photograph by Henry Ogg Forbes published in The Natural History of Socotra and Abd-el-kuri

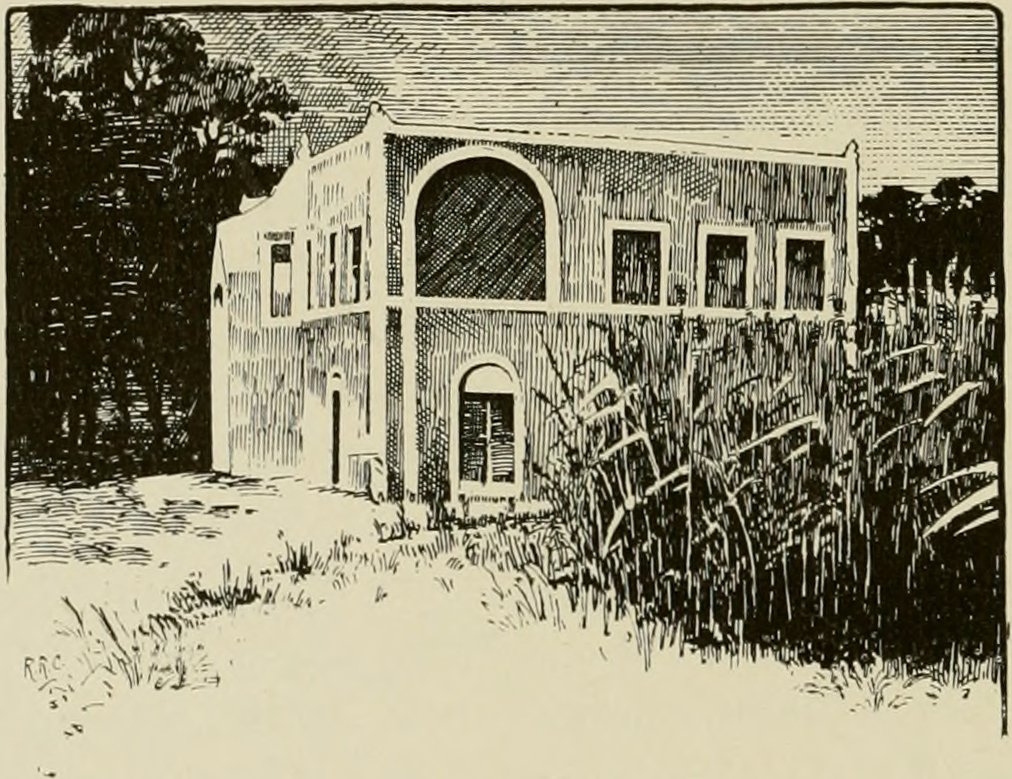
The guest house of the Sultan of Lahej, based on an 1898 photograph by Henry Ogg Forbes, from The Natural History of Socotra and Abd-el-kuri

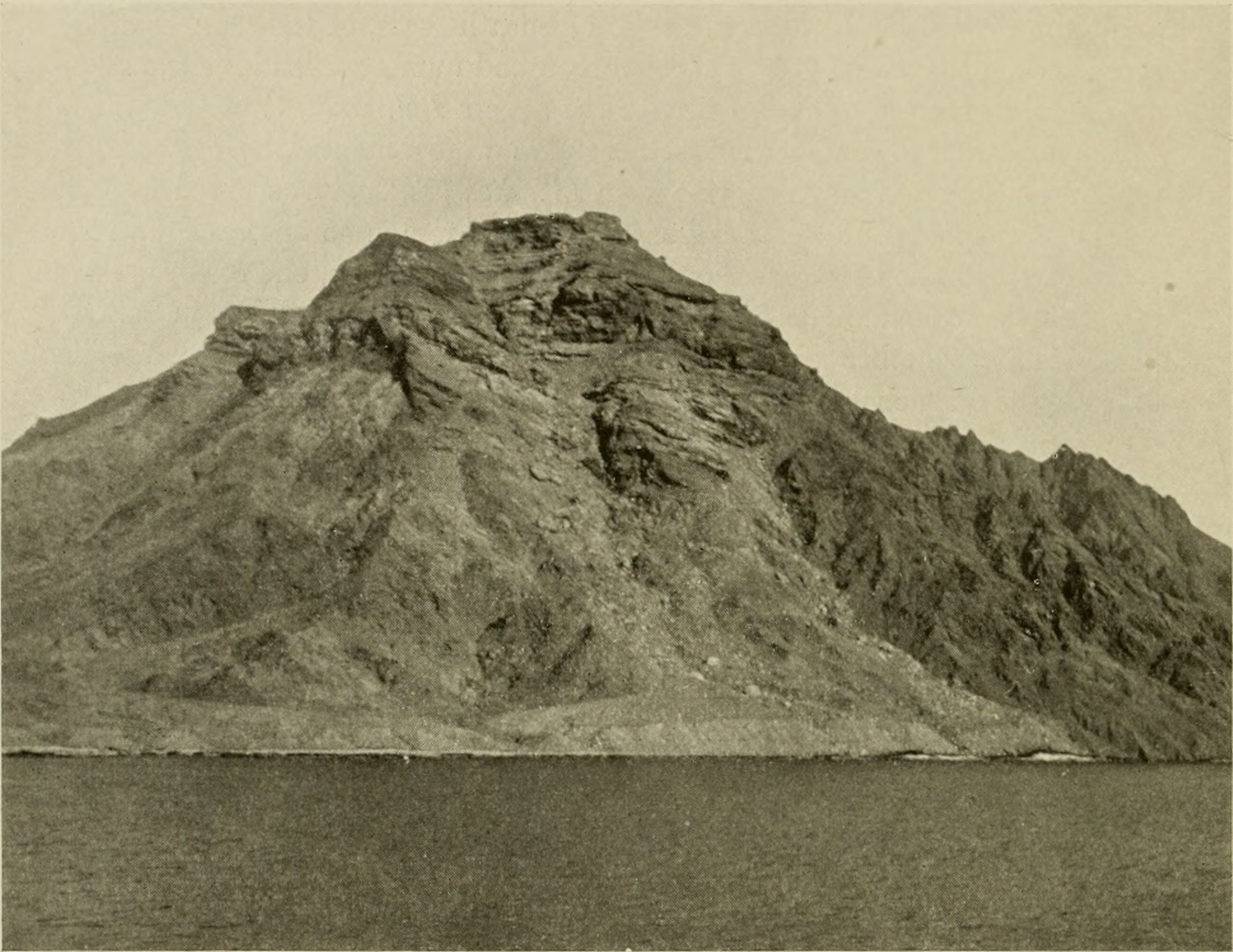
View of Southern Face of Gebel Saleh, Abd al Kuri

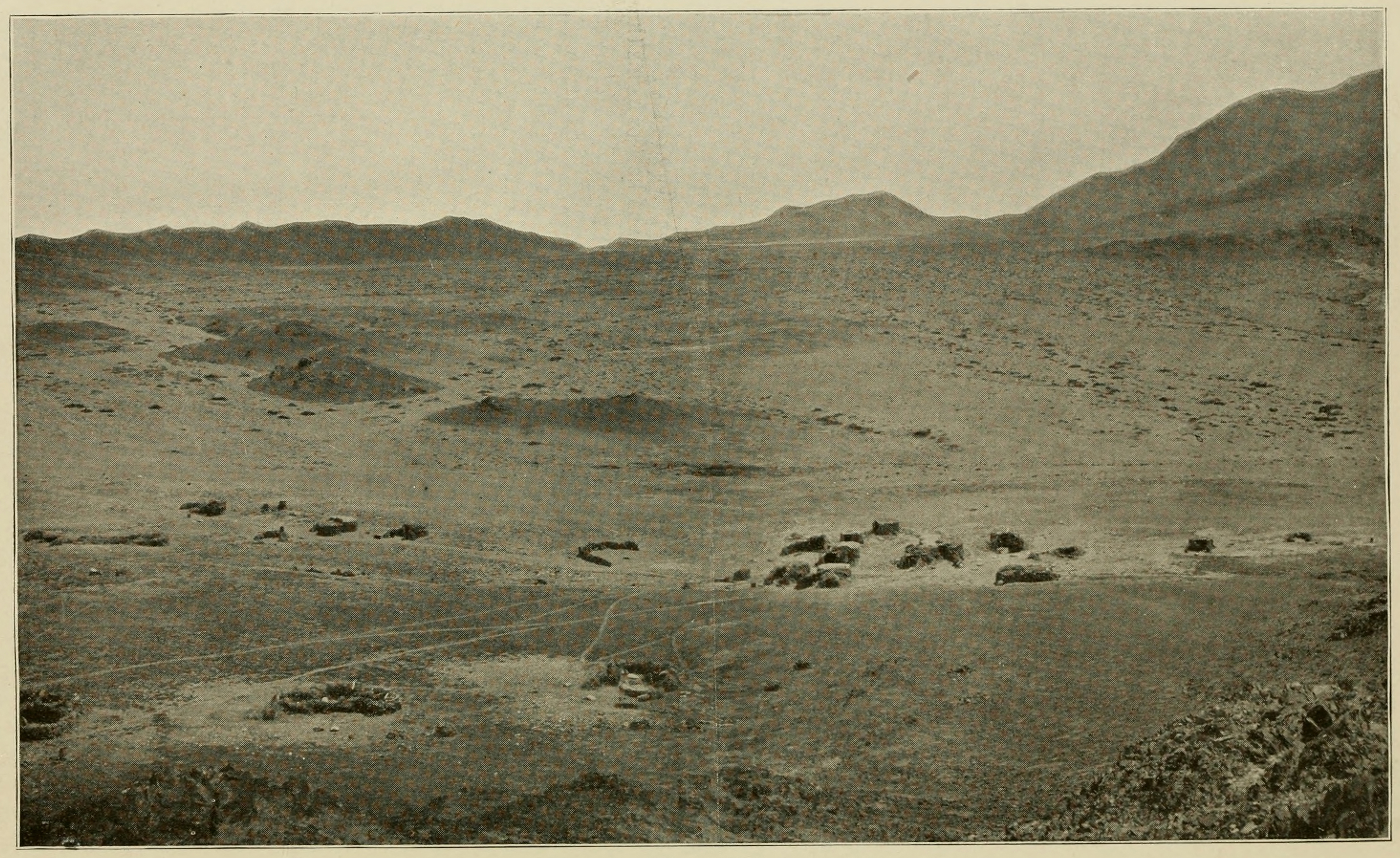
View of the 'Strath' and Native Dwellings, Abd-el-Kuri
