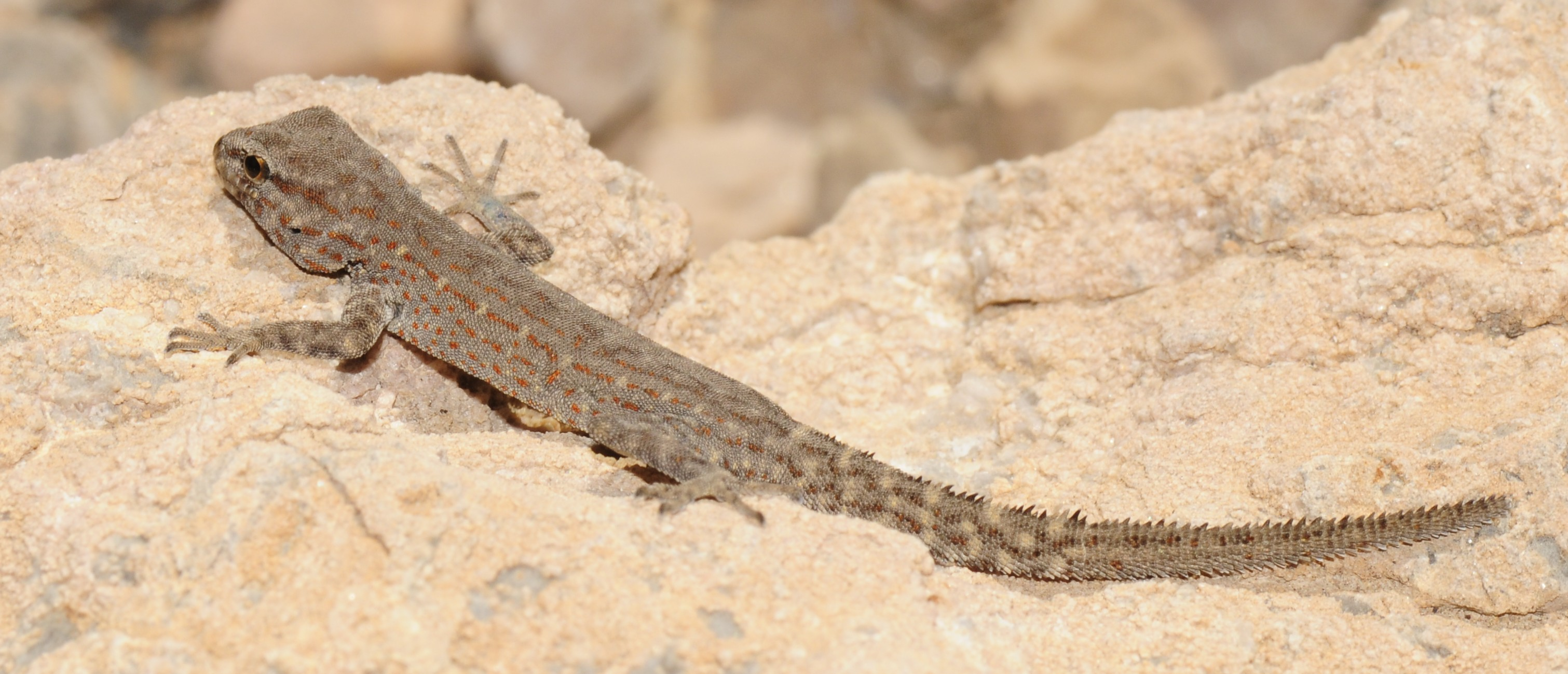
- Pristurus rupestris

Scientific classification
- Kingdom: Animalia
- Phylum: Chordata
- Class: Reptilia
- Order: Squamata
- Suborder: Gekkota
- Family: Sphaerodactylidae
- Genus: Pristurus; Rüppell, 1835

= Pristurus =

Genus of lizards

Pristurus is a genus of geckos native to Arabia and Socotra Island as well as the Middle East and the Horn of Africa. Species of Pristurus are commonly known as rock geckos .

The generic name Pristurus means "saw-tailed" in Latin.

== Species and subspecies ==
The following species and subspecies are recognized:

- Pristurus abdelkuri Arnold, 1986 – Abdel Kuri rock gecko
- Pristurus adrarensis Geniez & Arnold, 2006
- Pristurus carteri (Gray, 1863) – Carter's rock gecko, Carter's semaphore gecko
  - Pristurus carteri carteri (Gray, 1863)
  - Pristurus carteri tuberculatus Parker, 1931
- Pristurus celerrimus Arnold, 1977 – Oman rock gecko, bar-tailed semaphore gecko
- Pristurus collaris (Steindachner, 1867) – collared rock gecko
- Pristurus crucifer (Valenciennes, 1861) – Valenciennes rock gecko, cross-marked semaphore gecko
- Pristurus flavipunctatus Rüppell, 1835 – Middle Eastern rock gecko, Rüppell's semaphore gecko
- Pristurus gallagheri Arnold, 1986 – Gallagher's rock gecko, Wadi Kharrar rock gecko
- Pristurus guichardi Arnold, 1986 – Guichard's rock gecko
- Pristurus insignis Blanford, 1881 – Blanford's rock gecko
- Pristurus insignoides Arnold, 1986 – Haggier Massif rock gecko
- Pristurus longipes W. Peters, 1871 – Peters's rock gecko
- Pristurus masirahensis Tamar, Mitsi, Simó-Riudalbas, Tejero-Cicuéndez, Al-Sariri & Carranza, 2019
- Pristurus mazbah Al-Safadi, 1989
- Pristurus minimus Arnold, 1977 – Arnold's rock gecko, least semaphore gecko
- Pristurus obsti Rösler & Wranik, 1999 – mangrove semaphore gecko
- Pristurus ornithocephalus Arnold, 1986 – birdhead rock gecko
- Pristurus phillipsii Boulenger, 1895 – Somali rock gecko
- Pristurus popovi Arnold, 1982 – Saudi rock gecko
- Pristurus rupestris Blanford, 1874 – Persia rock gecko, rock semaphore gecko, Blanford's semaphore gecko
  - Pristurus rupestris guweirensis G. Haas, 1943
  - Pristurus rupestris iranicus K.P. Schmidt, 1952 – Iranian rock gecko
  - Pristurus rupestris rupestris Blanford, 1874
- Pristurus saada Arnold, 1986 – Yemen rock gecko
- Pristurus samhaensis Rösler & Wranik, 1999
- Pristurus schneideri Rösler, J. Köhler & Böhme, 2008
- Pristurus simonettai (Lanza & Sassi, 1968) – coastal rock gecko
- Pristurus sokotranus Parker, 1938 – Socotra rock gecko
- Pristurus somalicus Parker, 1932 – Somali rock gecko, Somali semaphore gecko

Nota bene: A binomial authority or trinomial authority in parentheses indicates that the species or subspecies was originally described in a genus other than Pristurus.
