= Blanford's rock gecko =

There are two species of gecko named Blanford's rock gecko:

- Bunopus blanfordii
- Pristurus insignis
