= Kilmia =

- Village
- Location of Abd al Kuri in the Socotra Archipelago

- Location of Kilmia in Yemen
- Coordinates: 12°11′N 52°14′E
- Country: Yemen
- Governorate: Socotra
- District: Qulensya wa Abd al Kuri
- Time zone: UTC+03:00 (Yemen Standard Time)

Kilmia is the main village of the island Abd al Kuri in the Guardafui Channel archipelago of Socotra, Yemen.

== See also ==
- List of cities in Socotra archipelago
