= Pristurus mazbah =

Conservation status
- Data Deficient (IUCN 3.1)

Scientific classification
- Kingdom: Animalia
- Phylum: Chordata
- Class: Reptilia
- Order: Squamata
- Suborder: Gekkota
- Family: Sphaerodactylidae
- Genus: Pristurus
- Species: P. mazbah

Binomial name
- Pristurus mazbah Al Safadi, 1989

Species of lizard

Pristurus mazbah is a species of lizard in the Sphaerodactylidae family found in Yemen.
