= Pristurus flavipunctatus =

Scientific classification
- Domain: Eukaryota
- Kingdom: Animalia
- Phylum: Chordata
- Class: Reptilia
- Order: Squamata
- Infraorder: Gekkota
- Family: Sphaerodactylidae
- Genus: Pristurus
- Species: P. flavipunctatus

Binomial name
- Pristurus flavipunctatus Rüppell, 1835

Species of lizard

Pristurus flavipunctatus, also known as Rüppell's semaphore gecko or Middle Eastern rock gecko , is a species of lizard in the Sphaerodactylidae family found in Ethiopia, Saudi Arabia, Egypt, Djibouti, Somalia, Sudan, Eritrea, and Jordan.
