= Socotra rock gecko =

Conservation status
- Least Concern (IUCN 3.1)

Scientific classification
- Kingdom: Animalia
- Phylum: Chordata
- Class: Reptilia
- Order: Squamata
- Suborder: Gekkota
- Family: Sphaerodactylidae
- Genus: Pristurus
- Species: P. sokotranus

Binomial name
- Pristurus sokotranus Parker, 1938

Species of lizard

The Socotra rock gecko (Pristurus sokotranus) is a species of lizard in the Sphaerodactylidae family found on Socotra Island. Phylogenetic studies have shown that P. sokotranus is paraphyletic, and DNA barcoding reveals about 9% intraspecific divergence at the cytochrome c oxidase subunit I (COI) gene, consistent with the presence of cryptic lineages.
