= Sphenomorphus forbesi =

Conservation status
- Least Concern (IUCN 3.1)

Scientific classification
- Kingdom: Animalia
- Phylum: Chordata
- Class: Reptilia
- Order: Squamata
- Family: Scincidae
- Genus: Sphenomorphus
- Species: S. forbesi

Binomial name
- Sphenomorphus forbesi (Boulenger, 1888)

Synonyms
- Lygosoma forbesi Boulenger, 1888; Lygosoma (Sphenomorphus) forbesi — M.A. Smith, 1937; Sphenomorphus forbesi — Greer, 1991

Species of lizard

Sphenomorphus forbesi, also known commonly as Forbes' forest skink and the slender litter skink, is a species of lizard in the family Scincidae. The species is endemic to Papua New Guinea.

== Etymology ==
The specific name, forbesi, is in honor of Henry Ogg Forbes, who was a Scottish explorer and naturalist.

== Geographic range ==
S. forbesi is found on the Sogeri Plateau in the Owen Stanley Range in Central Province, Papua New Guinea.

== Habitat ==
The preferred natural habitat of S. forbesi is forest, at altitudes of 700–1,900 m (2,300–6,200 ft), but it has also been found in oil palm plantations.

== Reproduction ==
S. forbesi is oviparous.
