= Pristurus adrarensis =

Conservation status
- Data Deficient (IUCN 3.1)

Scientific classification
- Kingdom: Animalia
- Phylum: Chordata
- Class: Reptilia
- Order: Squamata
- Suborder: Gekkota
- Family: Sphaerodactylidae
- Genus: Pristurus
- Species: P. adrarensis

Binomial name
- Pristurus adrarensis Geniez & Arnold, 2006

Species of lizard

Pristurus adrarensis is a species of lizard in the Sphaerodactylidae family found in Mauritania.
