= George Basil Popov =

Russian-British entomologist (1922–1998)

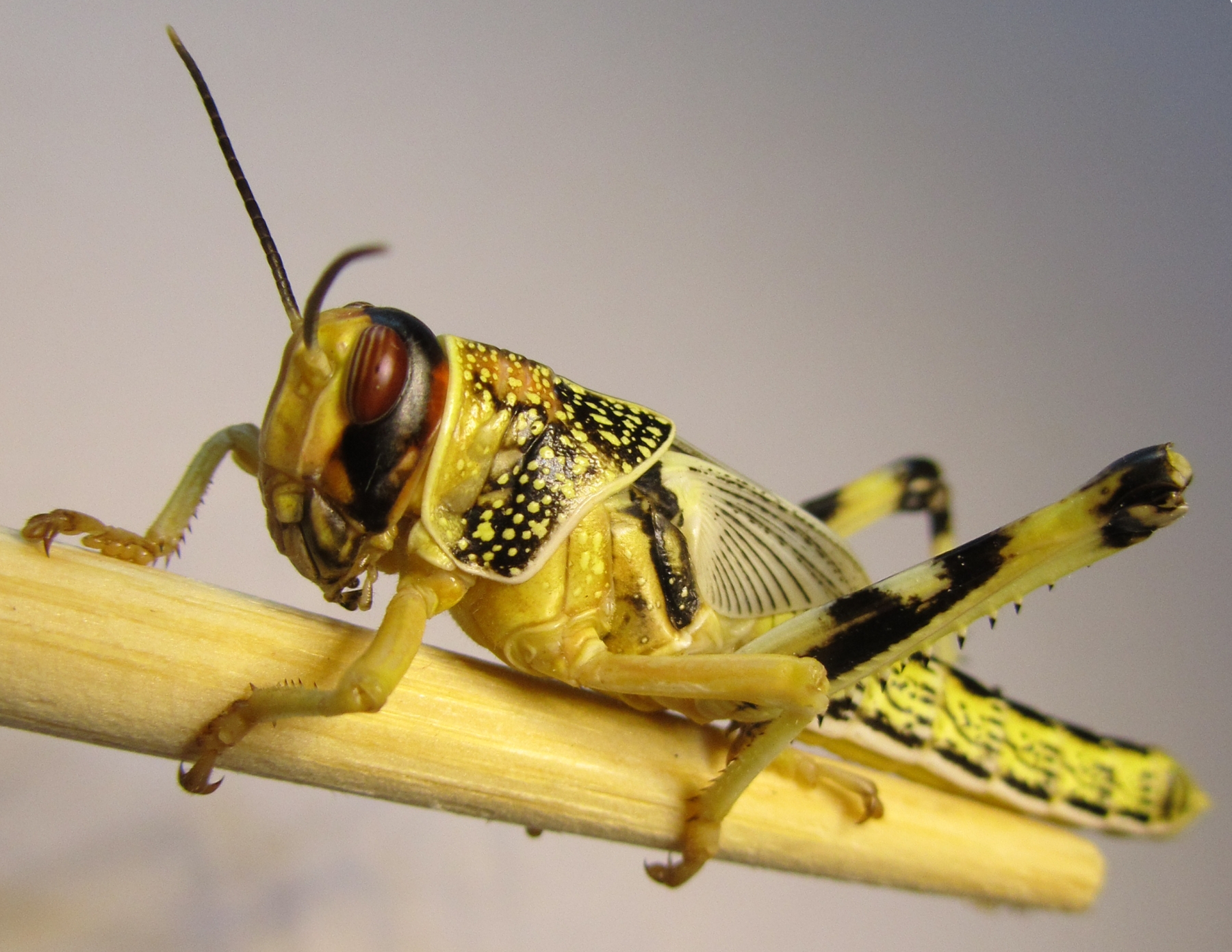
Desert locust - Schistocerca gregaria

George Basil Popov MBE (1922, in Iran – 22 December 1998, in London), was a Russian-British entomologist born in Iran, his father having been employed there by the Imperial Bank of Persia. Popov became an authority on the Desert locust.

George Popov was appointed to the Middle East Anti-Locust Unit by Boris Uvarov in 1943. His interest in migratory locusts and other grasshoppers (acridology) saw him visit Socotra (an expedition for Desert Locust Survey Nairobi), Eritrea, Mauritania, Niger, Senegal, Somalia, Sudan, Tanzania, Iran, Oman, Saudi Arabia, Pakistan, Bangladesh and Russia. His base was at the Anti-Locust Research Centre in London, working from there until his retirement in 1984. After retirement he remained active, embarking on programs for the Food and Agriculture Organization and others. Popov's knowledge of the Arabian Peninsula led to his receiving the Lawrence Memorial Medal (1995) from the Royal Society for Asian Affairs.

In 1957 Popov undertook a study on the locusts of Socotra. This led to his paper on the saltatorial Orthoptera of Socotra, and the first systematic description of its vegetation. The many botanical specimens collected during his studies of locusts were donated to the British Museum between 1966 and 1997.

A species of gecko, Pristurus popovi, is named in his honor.

== Selected publications ==
- "Atlas of Desert Locust Breeding Habitats" FAO (1997)
- "A Revision of the Grasshopper Genus Orthochtha and Allies" with L.D.C. Fishpool (1992)
- "The Oothecae of Locusts of the Sahel" (1990)
- "Nymphs of the Sahelian grasshoppers: An illustrated guide" (1989)
- "Acridoidea of eastern Arabia" Journal of Oman Studies Special Report, 2, 113-148 (1980)
- "A Revision of the Genus Poekilocerus Audinet-Serville 1831" with D.K.McE. Kevan (1979)
- "Environmental and behavioral processes in a Desert Locust outbreak" Nature 219: 446–450. with J. Roffey, J. (1968)
- "The Vegetation of Socotra" J. Linn. Soc. 55:362, 706–720, November 1957 (1957)
- "The saltatorial Orthoptera of Socotra" Zool. J. Linn. Soc. 43:359, 370 with Uvarov (1957)
