= Pristurus schneideri =

Conservation status
- Least Concern (IUCN 3.1)

Scientific classification
- Kingdom: Animalia
- Phylum: Chordata
- Class: Reptilia
- Order: Squamata
- Suborder: Gekkota
- Family: Sphaerodactylidae
- Genus: Pristurus
- Species: P. schneideri

Binomial name
- Pristurus schneideri Rösler, J. Köhler & Böhme, 2008

Species of lizard

Pristurus schneideri is a species of lizard in the family Sphaerodactylidae. The species is endemic to Yemen.

== Etymology ==
The specific name, schneideri, is in honor of German herpetologist Wolfgang Schneider of the Hessisches Landesmuseum in Darmstadt.

== Geographic range ==
P. schneideri is found on Hanish al Kabir Island, Yemen.

== Habitat ==
The preferred natural habitats of P. schneideri are the intertidal and supratidal zones, at elevations from sea level to 8 m (26 ft).

== Reproduction ==
P. schneideri is oviparous.
