= Trachylepis cristinae =

Scientific classification
- Kingdom: Animalia
- Phylum: Chordata
- Class: Reptilia
- Order: Squamata
- Family: Scincidae
- Genus: Trachylepis
- Species: T. cristinae

Binomial name
- Trachylepis cristinae Sindaco, Metallinou, Pupin, Fasola & Carranza, 2012

Species of lizard

Trachylepis cristinae, also known commonly as the Abd al Kuri skink, is a species of skink, a lizard in the family Scincidae. The species is endemic to Yemen.

== Etymology ==
The specific name, cristinae, is in honor of herpetologist Cristina Grieco, who was one of the collectors of the holotype.

== Geographic range ==
T. cristinae is found on the island of Abd al Kuri in Yemen.

== Description ==
T. cristinae may attain a snout-to-vent length (SVL) of 11.5 cm (4.5 in).
