= Pristurus masirahensis =

Scientific classification
- Kingdom: Animalia
- Phylum: Chordata
- Class: Reptilia
- Order: Squamata
- Suborder: Gekkota
- Family: Sphaerodactylidae
- Genus: Pristurus
- Species: P. masirahensis

Binomial name
- Pristurus masirahensis Tamar, Mitsi, Simo-Riudalbas, Tejero-Cicuéndez, Al-Sariri, & Carranza, 2019

Species of lizard

Pristurus masirahensis is a species of lizard in the Sphaerodactylidae family found on Masirah Island in Oman.
