= Saudi rock gecko =

Conservation status
- Least Concern (IUCN 3.1)

Scientific classification
- Kingdom: Animalia
- Phylum: Chordata
- Class: Reptilia
- Order: Squamata
- Suborder: Gekkota
- Family: Sphaerodactylidae
- Genus: Pristurus
- Species: P. popovi

Binomial name
- Pristurus popovi Arnold, 1982

Species of lizard

The Saudi rock gecko (Pristurus popovi) is a species of lizard in the family Sphaerodactylidae. The species is endemic to the Arabian Peninsula.

== Etymology ==
The specific name, popovi, is in honor of Russian-British entomologist George Basil Popov.

== Geographic range ==
P. popovi is found in Saudi Arabia and Yemen.

== Habitat ==
The preferred habitats of P. popovi are rocky areas and shrubland at altitudes of 1,700–3,600 m (5,600–11,800 ft).

== Reproduction ==
P. popovi is oviparous.
