= Coastal rock gecko =

Conservation status
- Least Concern (IUCN 3.1)

Scientific classification
- Kingdom: Animalia
- Phylum: Chordata
- Class: Reptilia
- Order: Squamata
- Suborder: Gekkota
- Family: Sphaerodactylidae
- Genus: Pristurus
- Species: P. simonettai

Binomial name
- Pristurus simonettai (Lanza & Sassi, 1968)

Synonyms
- Geisopristurus simonettai Lanza & Sassi, 1968; Pristurus simonettai — Kluge, 1993

Species of lizard

The coastal rock gecko (Pristurus simonettai) is a species of lizard in the family Sphaerodactylidae. The species is endemic to Somalia.

== Etymology ==
The specific name, simonettai, is in honor of Italian zoologist Alberto Mario Simonetta (born 1930).

== Geographic range ==
P. simonettai is found in southern Somalia.

== Description ==
The body of P. simonettai is almost completely covered with strongly carinate imbricate scales.

== Reproduction ==
P. simonettai is oviparous.
