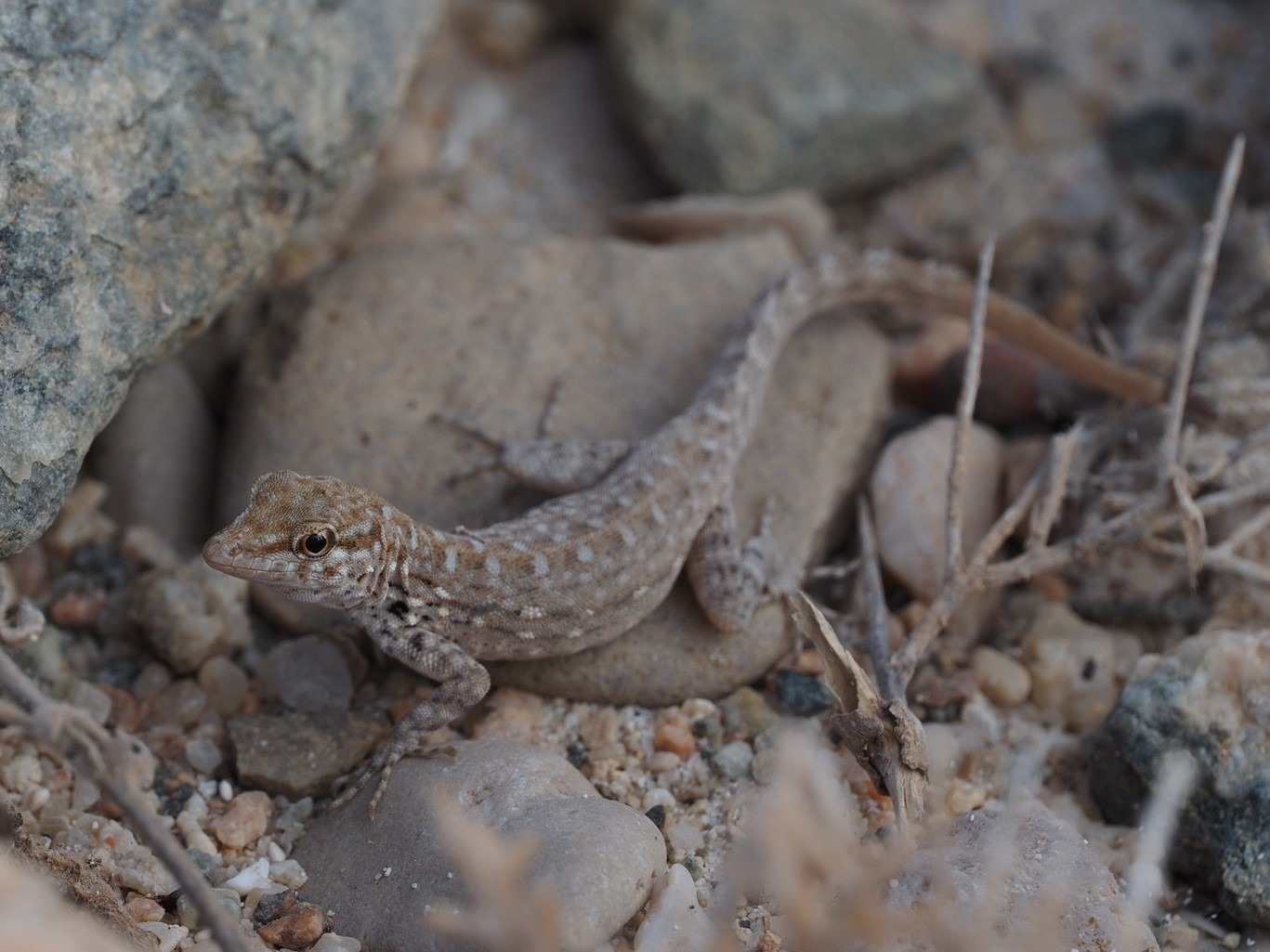

Conservation status
- Least Concern (IUCN 3.1)

Scientific classification
- Kingdom: Animalia
- Phylum: Chordata
- Class: Reptilia
- Order: Squamata
- Suborder: Gekkota
- Family: Sphaerodactylidae
- Genus: Pristurus
- Species: P. abdelkuri

Binomial name
- Pristurus abdelkuri Arnold, 1986

= Abdel Kuri rock gecko =

Species of lizard

The Abdel Kuri rock gecko (Pristurus abdelkuri) is a species of lizard in the family Sphaerodactylidae found on Abd al Kuri.
