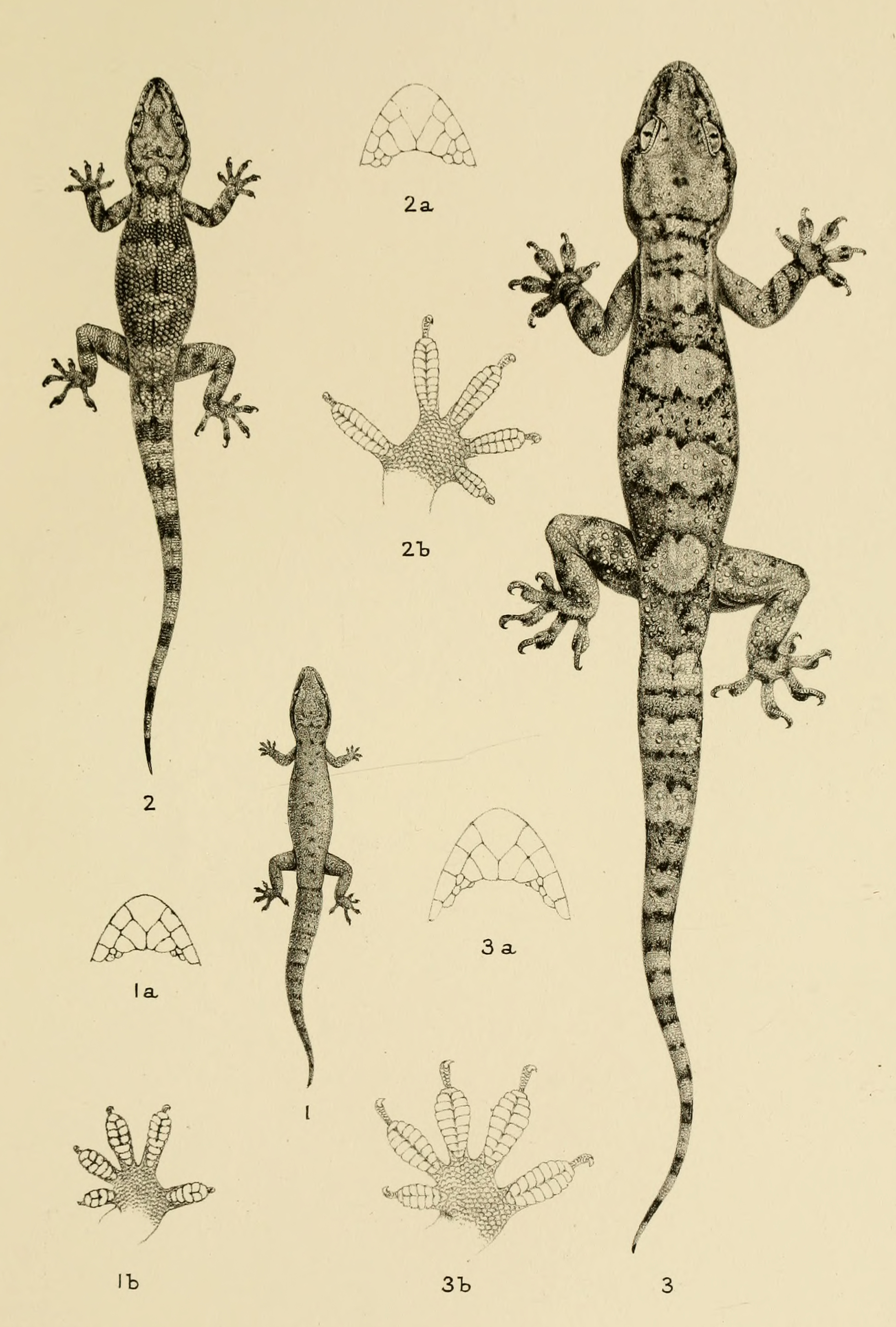

Conservation status
- Least Concern (IUCN 3.1)

Scientific classification
- Kingdom: Animalia
- Phylum: Chordata
- Class: Reptilia
- Order: Squamata
- Suborder: Gekkota
- Family: Gekkonidae
- Genus: Hemidactylus
- Species: H. oxyrhinus

Binomial name
- Hemidactylus oxyrhinus Boulenger, 1899
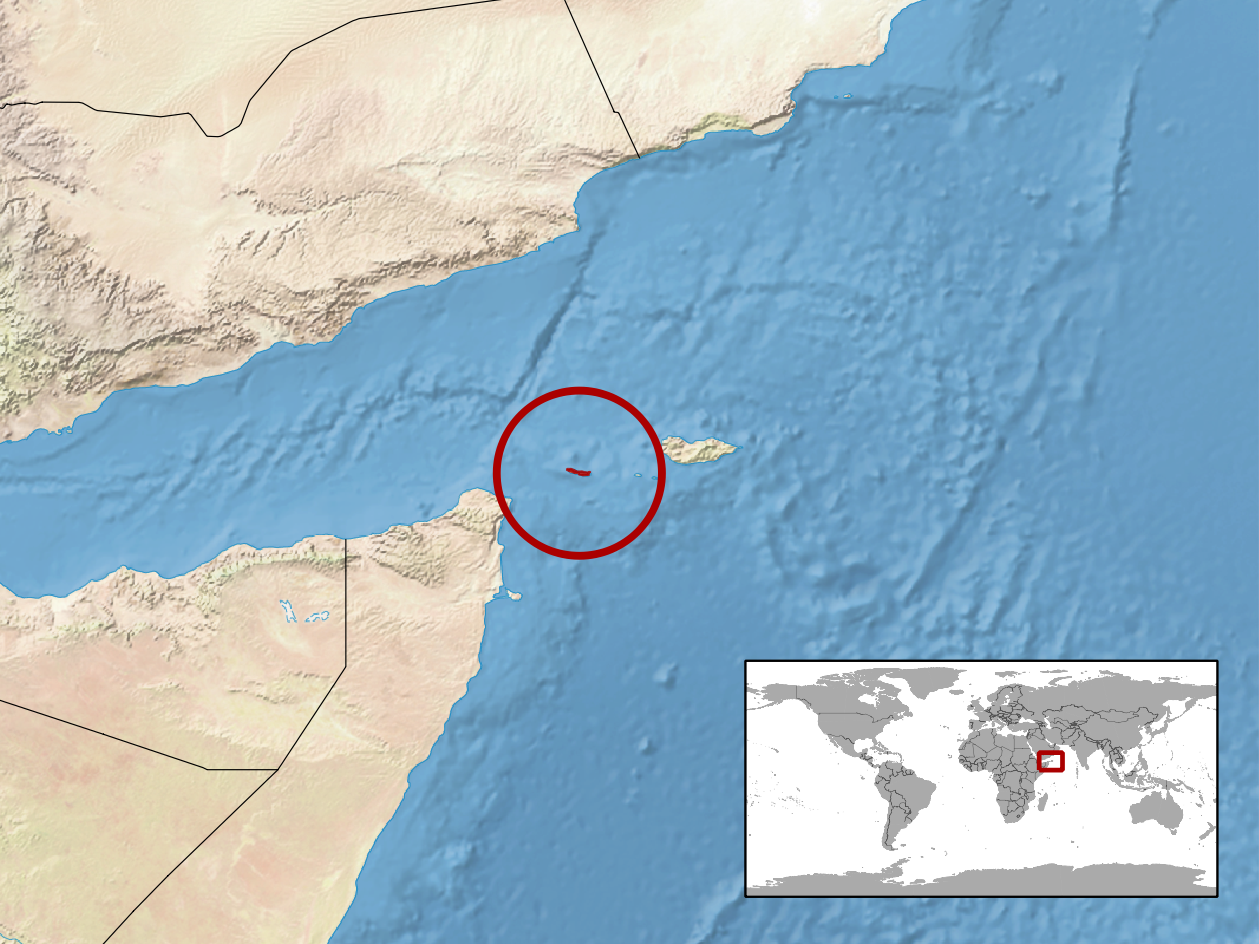

= Sharpnose leaf-toed gecko =

Species of lizard

The sharpnose leaf-toed gecko (Hemidactylus oxyrhinus) is a species of gecko. It is endemic to Abd al Kuri in the Socotra archipelago.
