= Pristurus minimus =

Conservation status
- Least Concern (IUCN 3.1)

Scientific classification
- Kingdom: Animalia
- Phylum: Chordata
- Class: Reptilia
- Order: Squamata
- Suborder: Gekkota
- Family: Sphaerodactylidae
- Genus: Pristurus
- Species: P. minimus

Binomial name
- Pristurus minimus Arnold, 1977

Species of lizard

Pristurus minimus, also known as Arnold's rock gecko or least semaphore gecko, is a species of lizard in the Sphaerodactylidae family found in Oman, the United Arab Emirates, and Yemen.

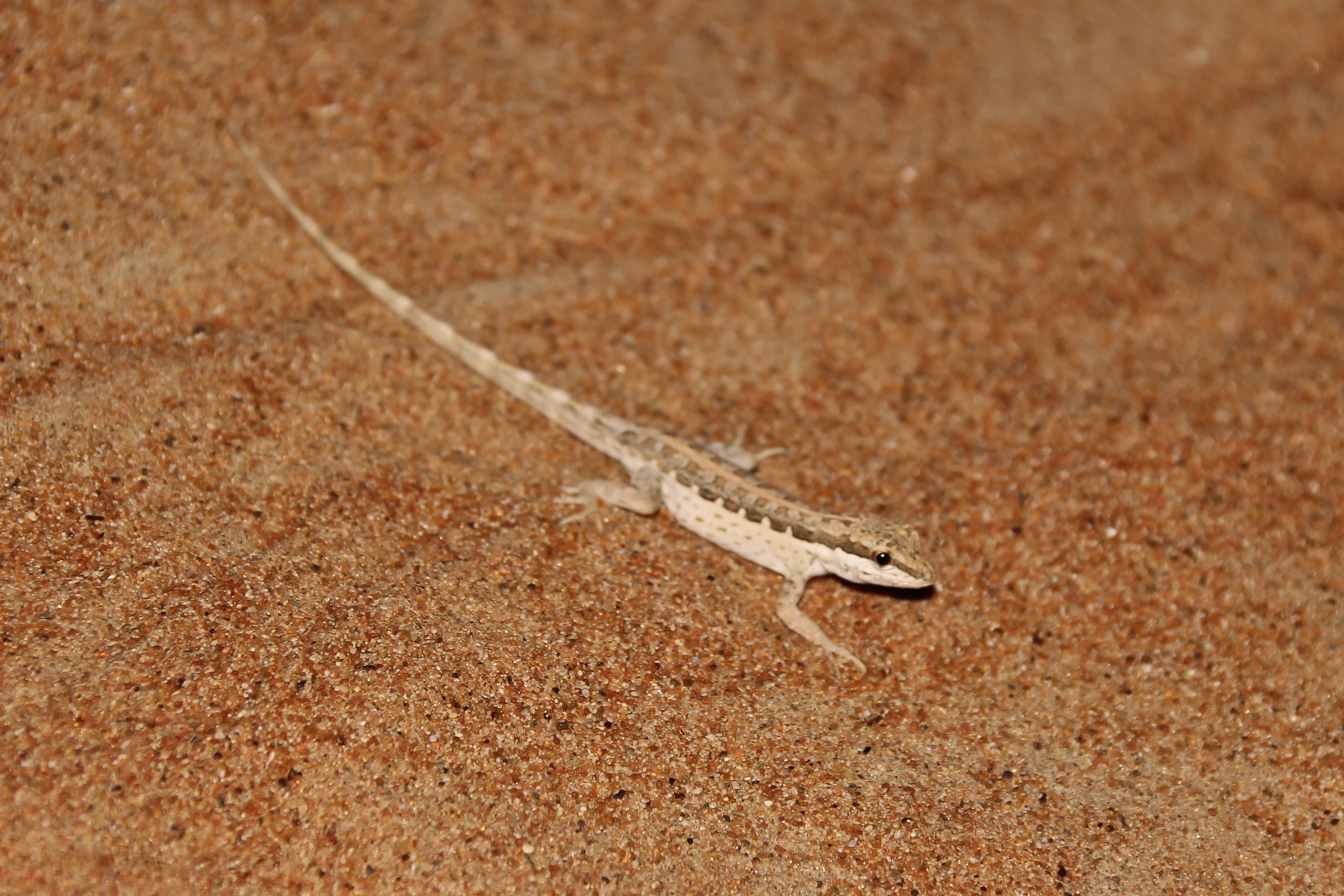
Pristurus minimus from United Arab Emirates
