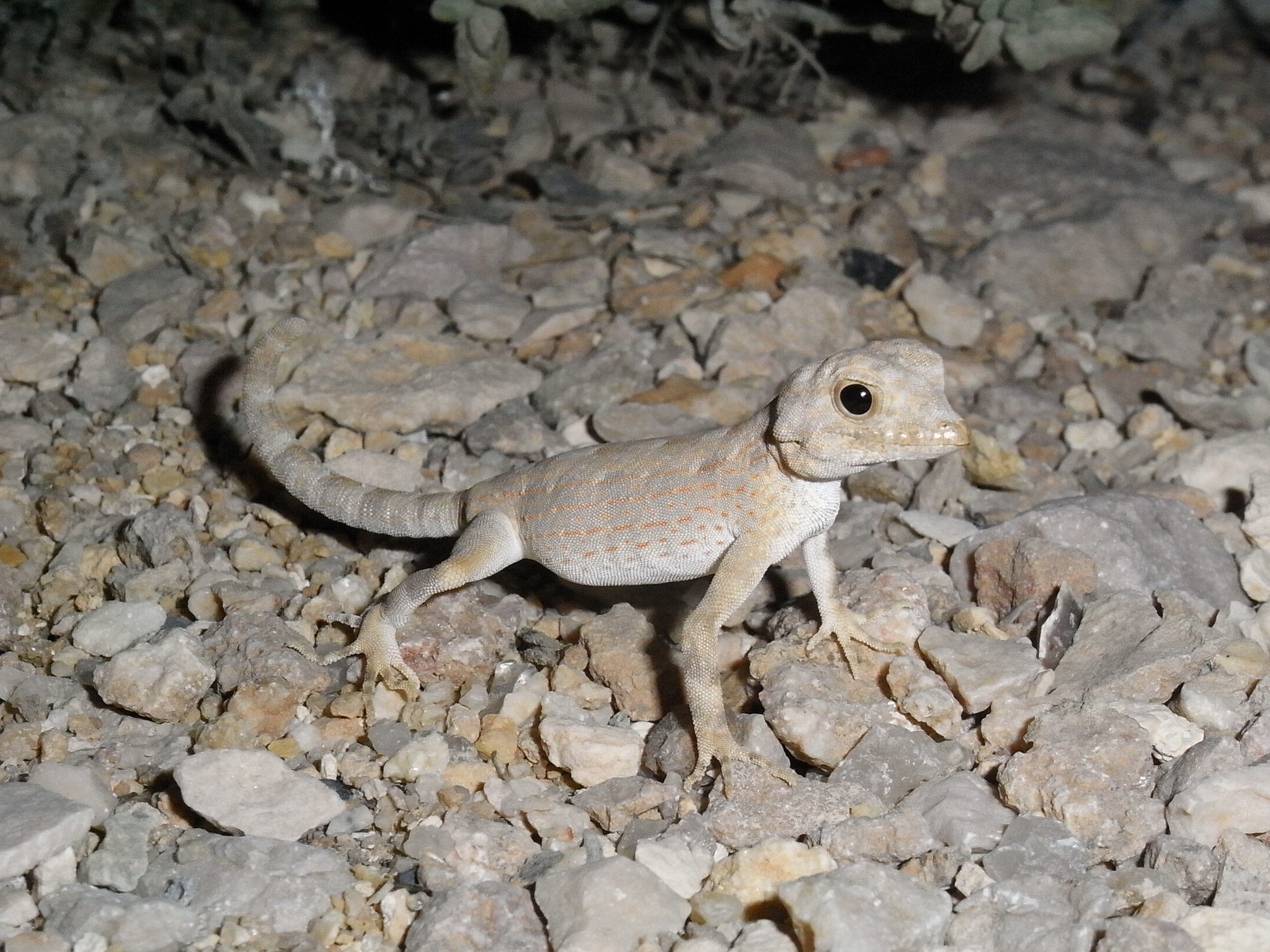

Conservation status
- Least Concern (IUCN 3.1)

Scientific classification
- Kingdom: Animalia
- Phylum: Chordata
- Class: Reptilia
- Order: Squamata
- Suborder: Gekkota
- Family: Sphaerodactylidae
- Genus: Pristurus
- Species: P. carteri

Binomial name
- Pristurus carteri (Gray, 1863)

Synonyms
- Spatalura carteri Gray, 1863; Pristurus carteri — Boulenger, 1885

= Pristurus carteri =

Species of lizard

Pristurus carteri, commonly known as Carter's rock gecko, Carter's semaphore gecko or the scorpion tailed gecko is a species of gecko, a lizard in the family Sphaerodactylidae.

A scorpion-tailed gecko at a reptile expo in Las Vegas.

== Etymology ==
The generic name, Pristurus, means "saw-tailed" in Latin.

The specific name, carteri, is in honor of Dr. Henry Carter who collected the holotype.

== Subspecies ==
There are two subspecies of Pristurus carteri. The first is the nominotypical subspecies, Pristurus carteri carteri (Gray, 1863), and the other is Pristurus carteri tuberculatus Parker, 1931, P. c. carteri being the more common.

== Common names ==
The species P. carteri has many common names such as Carter's rock gecko, ornate rock gecko, and scorpion-tailed gecko.

== Geographic range and habitat ==
P. carteri is native to Oman, Saudi Arabia, United Arab Emirates, and Yemen, where it often is found basking on rocks or in urban areas.

== Behavior ==
P. carteri are often seen swaying their curly tails back and forth to each other in a way to sort of communicate to each other. The males develop little fleshy spikes on their tails upon reaching sexual maturity. When they feel threatened they curl their tails in a scorpion-like fashion and even mimic the movements a scorpion will use as a threat display; this and the tail waving are the source of the common name scorpion-tailed geckos.

Members of the genus Pristurus are diurnal. This is unusual in geckos except in the genera Phelsuma, Lygodactylus, Naultinus, Quedenfeldtia, Rhoptropus, all Sphaerodactylids, and, of course, Pristurus.

== Description ==
P. carteri may attain an average snout-to-vent length (SVL) of 5–6 cm (2.0–2.4 in), and a total length (including tail) of 8–9 cm (3.1–3.5 in).

== Reproduction ==
P. carteri reaches sexual maturity in roughly 10 months. Adult females lay 1–2 hard shelled eggs that are incubated at 28 °C (82.4 °F) for 70–90 days. Each neonate hatches out at a total length of about 3.5–4 cm (1.4–1.6 in).
