= Guichard's rock gecko =

Conservation status
- Least Concern (IUCN 3.1)

Scientific classification
- Kingdom: Animalia
- Phylum: Chordata
- Class: Reptilia
- Order: Squamata
- Suborder: Gekkota
- Family: Sphaerodactylidae
- Genus: Pristurus
- Species: P. guichardi

Binomial name
- Pristurus guichardi Arnold, 1986

Species of lizard

Guichard's rock gecko (Pristurus guichardi) is a species of lizard in the family Sphaerodactylidae. The species is endemic to the island of Socotra of Yemen.

== Etymology ==
The specific name, guichardi, is in honor of British entomologist Kenneth Mackinnon Guichard.

== Habitat ==
The preferred natural habitats of P. guichardi are forest and shrubland, at altitudes of 90–1,030 m (300–3,380 ft).

== Behavior ==
P. guichardi is arboreal.

== Reproduction ==
P. guichardi is oviparous.
