= Ruellia kuriensis =

Conservation status
- Vulnerable (IUCN 3.1)

Scientific classification
- Kingdom: Plantae
- Clade: Tracheophytes
- Clade: Angiosperms
- Clade: Eudicots
- Clade: Asterids
- Order: Lamiales
- Family: Acanthaceae
- Genus: Ruellia
- Species: R. kuriensis

Binomial name
- Ruellia kuriensis Vierh. (1906)

Species of shrub

Ruellia kuriensis is a species of plant in the family Acanthaceae. It is a subshrub endemic to the island of Abd al Kuri in the Socotra archipelago off the coast of northeastern Africa, which is politically part of Yemen. Its natural habitat is subtropical or tropical dry shrubland.
