= Birdhead rock gecko =

Conservation status
- Least Concern (IUCN 3.1)

Scientific classification
- Kingdom: Animalia
- Phylum: Chordata
- Class: Reptilia
- Order: Squamata
- Suborder: Gekkota
- Family: Sphaerodactylidae
- Genus: Pristurus
- Species: P. ornithocephalus

Binomial name
- Pristurus ornithocephalus Arnold, 1986

Species of lizard

The birdhead rock gecko (Pristurus ornithocephalus) is a species of lizard in the Sphaerodactylidae family found in Yemen.
