= Mangrove semaphore gecko =

Conservation status
- Least Concern (IUCN 3.1)

Scientific classification
- Kingdom: Animalia
- Phylum: Chordata
- Class: Reptilia
- Order: Squamata
- Suborder: Gekkota
- Family: Sphaerodactylidae
- Genus: Pristurus
- Species: P. obsti

Binomial name
- Pristurus obsti Rösler & Wranik, 1999

Species of lizard

The mangrove semaphore gecko (Pristurus obsti), also known commonly as Obst's rock gecko, is a species of lizard in the family Sphaerodactylidae. The species is endemic to Socotra Island.

== Etymology ==
The specific name, obsti, is in honor of German herpetologist Fritz Jürgen Obst (1939–2018).

== Geographic distribution ==
Pristurus obsti is only found on Socotra Island, which is part of Yemen

== Habitat ==
The preferred natural habitats of Pristurus obsti are shrubland, savanna, and forest, at elevations of 5–700 m (16–2,297 ft).

== Behavior ==
Pristurus obsti is arboreal.

== Reproduction ==
Pristurus obsti is oviparous.
