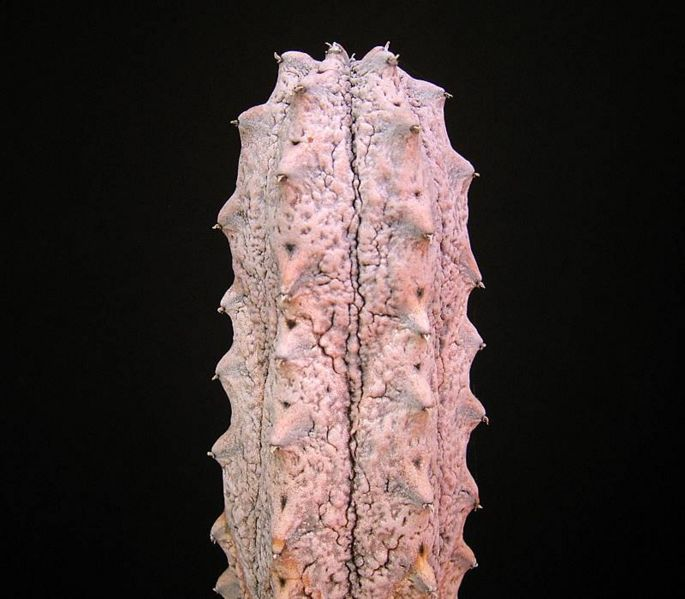

Conservation status
- Endangered (IUCN 3.1)
- CITES Appendix II

Scientific classification
- Kingdom: Plantae
- Clade: Tracheophytes
- Clade: Angiosperms
- Clade: Eudicots
- Clade: Rosids
- Order: Malpighiales
- Family: Euphorbiaceae
- Genus: Euphorbia
- Species: E. abdelkuri

Binomial name
- Euphorbia abdelkuri Balf.f.

= Euphorbia abdelkuri =

Species of plant found in Yemen

Euphorbia abdelkuri is a species of plant in the family Euphorbiaceae. It is endemic to Abd al Kuri, an island south of Yemen. Its natural habitat is rocky areas. The latex of the plant is toxic.

As most other succulent members of the genus Euphorbia, its trade is regulated under Appendix II of CITES.
