= Peters's rock gecko =

Peters' rock gecko

Conservation status
- Data Deficient (IUCN 3.1)

Scientific classification
- Kingdom: Animalia
- Phylum: Chordata
- Class: Reptilia
- Order: Squamata
- Suborder: Gekkota
- Family: Sphaerodactylidae
- Genus: Pristurus
- Species: P. longipes

Binomial name
- Pristurus longipes Peters, 1871

Species of lizard

Peters' rock gecko (Pristurus longipes) is a species of lizard in the Sphaerodactylidae family found in Yemen.
