= Collared rock gecko =

Conservation status
- Least Concern (IUCN 3.1)

Scientific classification
- Kingdom: Animalia
- Phylum: Chordata
- Class: Reptilia
- Order: Squamata
- Suborder: Gekkota
- Family: Sphaerodactylidae
- Genus: Pristurus
- Species: P. collaris

Binomial name
- Pristurus collaris (Steindachner, 1867)

Species of lizard

The collared rock gecko (Pristurus collaris) is a species of lizard in the family Sphaerodactylidae found in Saudi Arabia and Yemen.

It is an oviparous animal, meaning that it reproduces by laying eggs.

It is also quite a small animal. The average size of a collared rock gecko is about 52mm from the snout to its vent.
