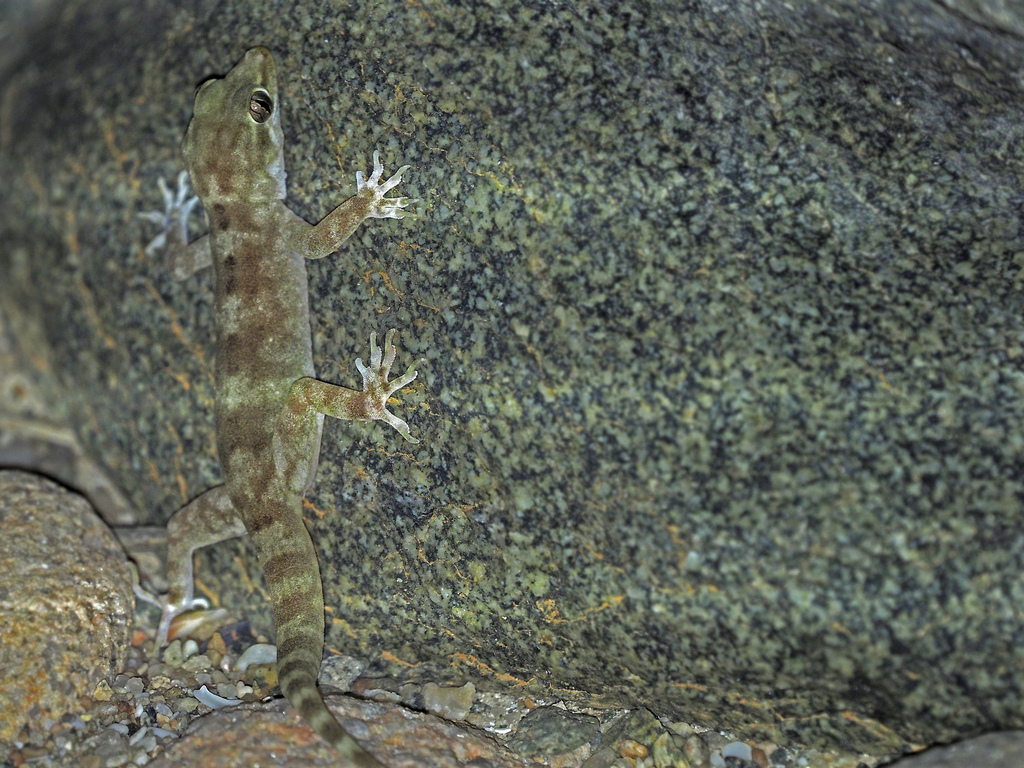

Conservation status
- Least Concern (IUCN 3.1)

Scientific classification
- Kingdom: Animalia
- Phylum: Chordata
- Class: Reptilia
- Order: Squamata
- Suborder: Gekkota
- Family: Gekkonidae
- Genus: Hemidactylus
- Species: H. forbesii

Binomial name
- Hemidactylus forbesii Boulenger, 1899
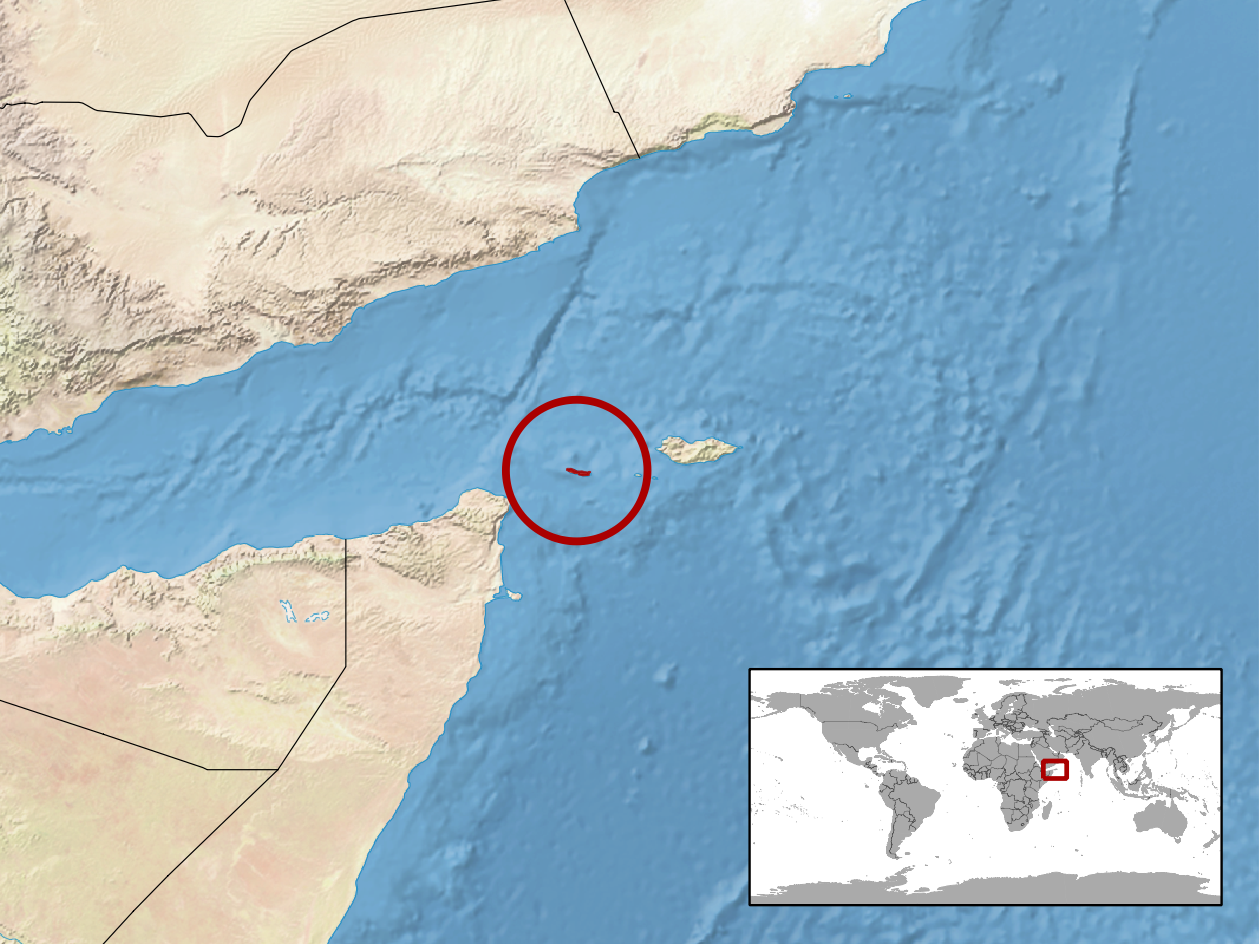

= Socotra leaf-toed gecko =

Species of lizard

The Socotra leaf-toed gecko (Hemidactylus forbesii) is a species of lizard in the family Gekkonidae. The species is endemic to the island of Abd al-Kuri in the Socotra archipelago.

== Etymology ==
The specific name, forbesii, is in honor of Henry Ogg Forbes, who was a Scottish explorer and naturalist.

== Habitat ==
The preferred natural habitat of H. forbesii is the intertidal zone.

== Reproduction ==
H. forbesii is oviparous. Eggs are laid in rock crevices or under stones.
