= Pristurus crucifer =

Scientific classification
- Kingdom: Animalia
- Phylum: Chordata
- Class: Reptilia
- Order: Squamata
- Suborder: Gekkota
- Family: Sphaerodactylidae
- Genus: Pristurus
- Species: P. crucifer

Binomial name
- Pristurus crucifer (Valenciennes, 1861)

Synonyms
- Gymnodactylus crucifer Valenciennes, 1861; Pristurus crucifer — Boulenger, 1885; Pristurus stefaninii Calabresi, 1927; Pristurus crucifer laticephalus Scortecci, 1933; Pristurus crucifer — Kluge, 1993

Species of lizard

Pristurus crucifer, also known commonly as the cross-marked semaphore gecko or Valenciennes rock gecko, is a species of lizard in the family Sphaerodactylidae. The species is native to eastern Africa and western Asia.

== Geographic range ==
P. crucifer is found in Eritrea, Ethiopia, Kenya, Saudi Arabia, and Somalia.

== Reproduction ==
P. crucifer is oviparous.
