= Convolvulus kossmatii =

Conservation status
- Vulnerable (IUCN 3.1)

Scientific classification
- Kingdom: Plantae
- Clade: Tracheophytes
- Clade: Angiosperms
- Clade: Eudicots
- Clade: Asterids
- Order: Solanales
- Family: Convolvulaceae
- Genus: Convolvulus
- Species: C. kossmatii

Binomial name
- Convolvulus kossmatii Vierh. (1907)

Synonyms
- Bonamia spinosa Vierh. (1904); Seddera spinosa (Vierh.) Verdc. (1971)

Species of bindweed

Convolvulus kossmatii is a species of plant in the family Convolvulaceae. It is endemic to the island of Abd al Kuri in the Socotra archipelago of Yemen. Its natural habitat is subtropical or tropical dry shrubland.
