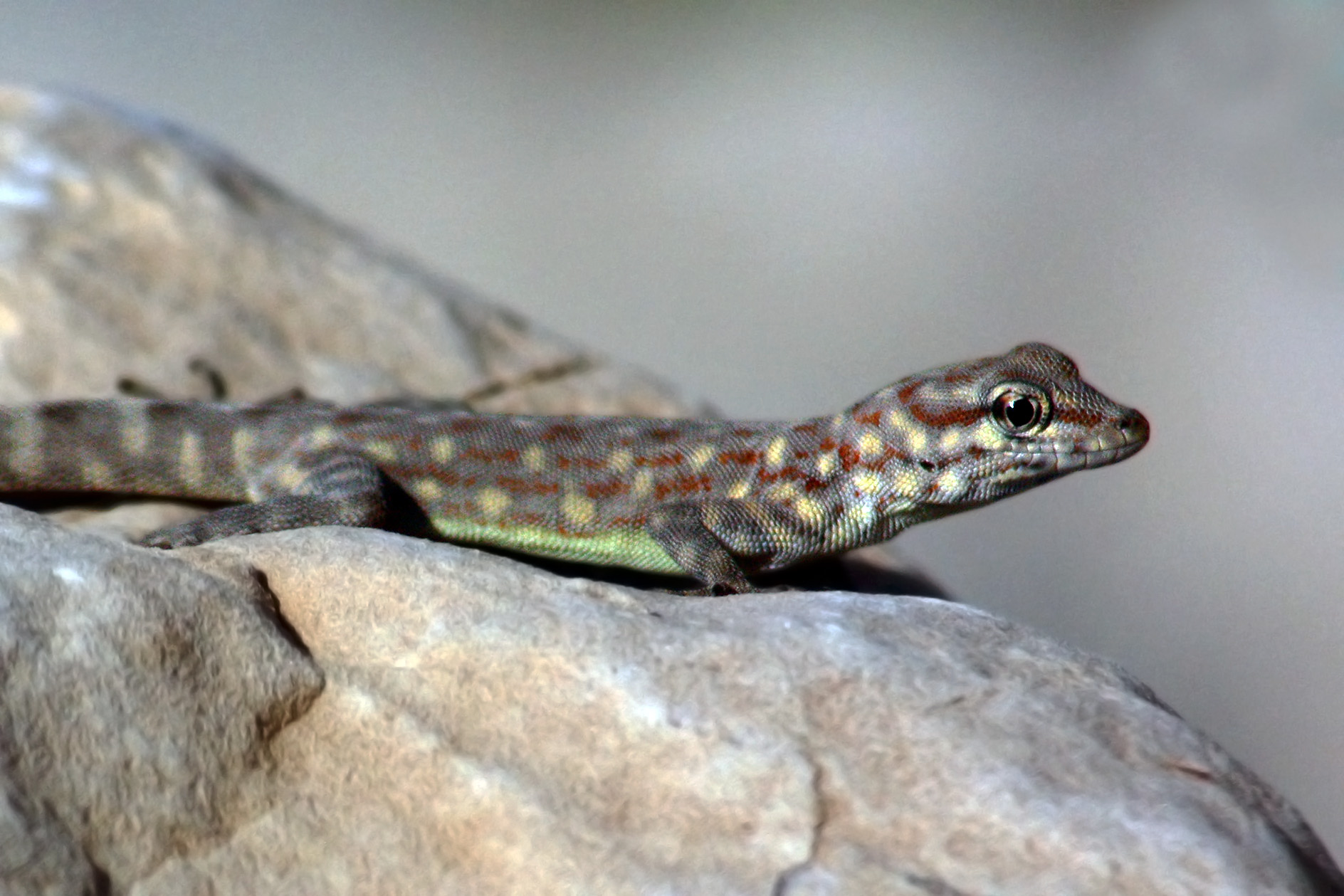
- In Zighy Bay, Musandam Peninsula, Oman

Conservation status
- Least Concern (IUCN 3.1)

Scientific classification
- Kingdom: Animalia
- Phylum: Chordata
- Class: Reptilia
- Order: Squamata
- Suborder: Gekkota
- Family: Sphaerodactylidae
- Genus: Pristurus
- Species: P. rupestris

Binomial name
- Pristurus rupestris Blanford, 1874

= Pristurus rupestris =

Species of lizard

Pristurus rupestris, also known as the rock semaphore gecko, Blanford's semaphore gecko, and Persia rock gecko, is a species of gecko in the genus Pristurus which inhabits parts of Arabia, Iran, Pakistan, Somalia, and Eritrea. This species lives in stony formations, mainly in flat, hard, sandy, barren regions and gravelly plains. It also lives in open, dry forest and bushland. It can be found under stones, on the walls of buildings, and on beaches. It is an egg-laying species.
