= Pristurus samhaensis =

Conservation status
- Least Concern (IUCN 3.1)

Scientific classification
- Kingdom: Animalia
- Phylum: Chordata
- Class: Reptilia
- Order: Squamata
- Suborder: Gekkota
- Family: Sphaerodactylidae
- Genus: Pristurus
- Species: P. samhaensis

Binomial name
- Pristurus samhaensis Rösler & Wranik, 1999

Species of lizard

Pristurus samhaensis is a species of lizard in the Sphaerodactylidae family found on Samhah and Darsah islands.
