= Qulensya =

Qulensya قلنسية
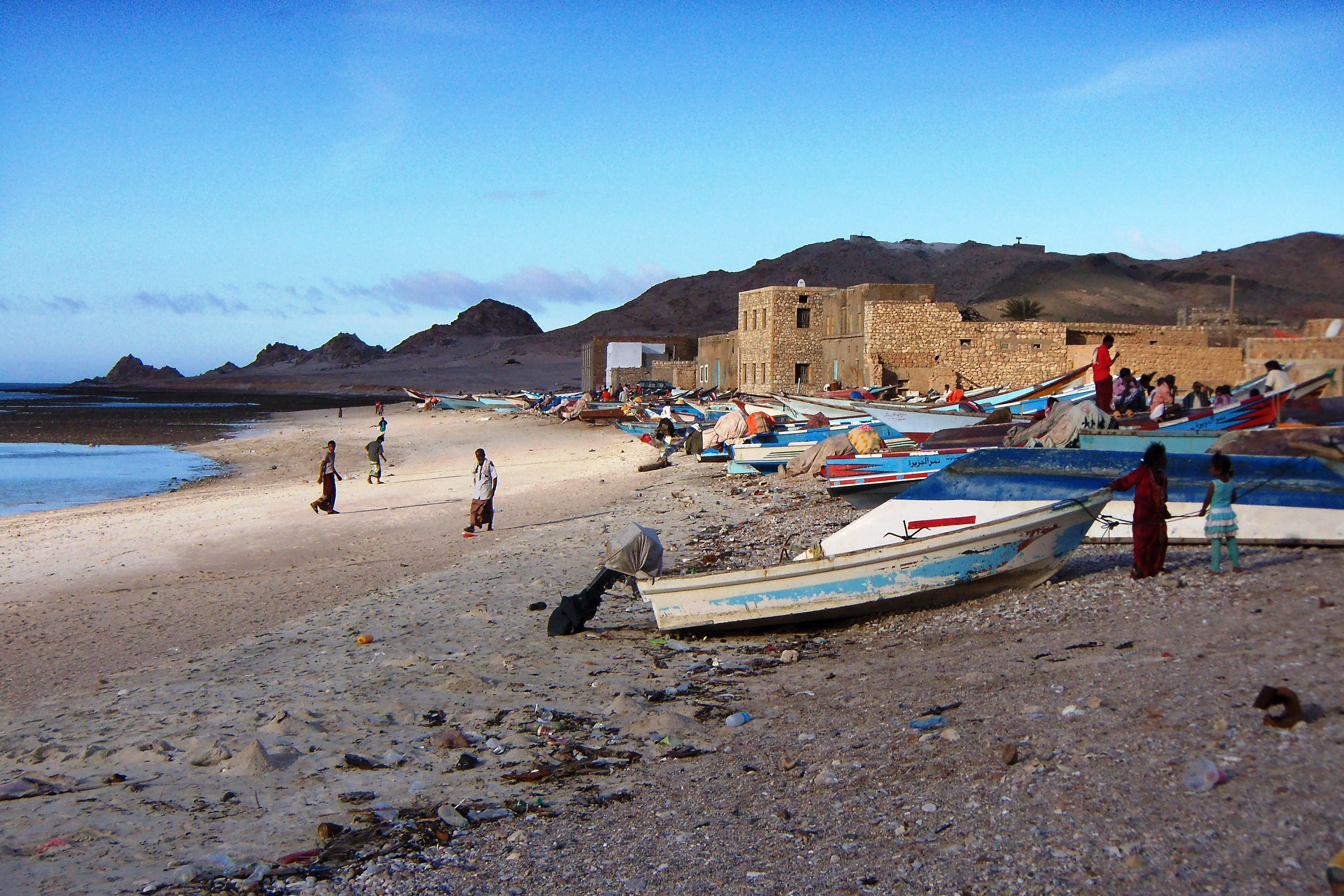
- Fishing village on the shoreline of Qulensya

- Location within Yemen
- Coordinates: 12°41′21″N 53°29′16″E
- Country: Yemen
- Region: Hadhramaut
- Governorate: Socotra Governorate
- Island: Socotra
- District: Qulensya wa Abd al Kuri

Population
  - Total: 4,000

Qulensya (Arabic: قلنسية, romanized: Qulansiya; alt. Qalansiyah, Qalansia) is a town on the main island of Socotra, Yemen. It is located in the Qulensya wa Abd al Kuri District, and its approximate population is 4,000.

== History ==
The area around Qulensya is host to several petroglyph sites created at an undetermined time. One site called Simar Qar lies 16 km (9.9 mi) west of the town. It consists of what appears to be an altar stone and two rock cupules with letters inscribed on the sides. Another site, known as Haida, was discovered in 1900 to the north of the town towards the mountains, though its exact location is unknown. At this site, inscriptions were found which were believed to have been from either a late Himyaritic or an Ethiopic script.

Before an 1876 protection treaty with the British, the island of Socotra was barely governed by the ruling Mahra Sultanate. Socotra was merely used as a tax farm by the sultan, who annually sent a relative to collect taxes in the form of ghee. These taxes were primarily collected from the villages of Hadibu, Qād̨ub, and Qulensya. During this time period, Qulensya was one of the five largest villages on the island, though these five urban agglomerations altogether had a population of only 1,880 people.

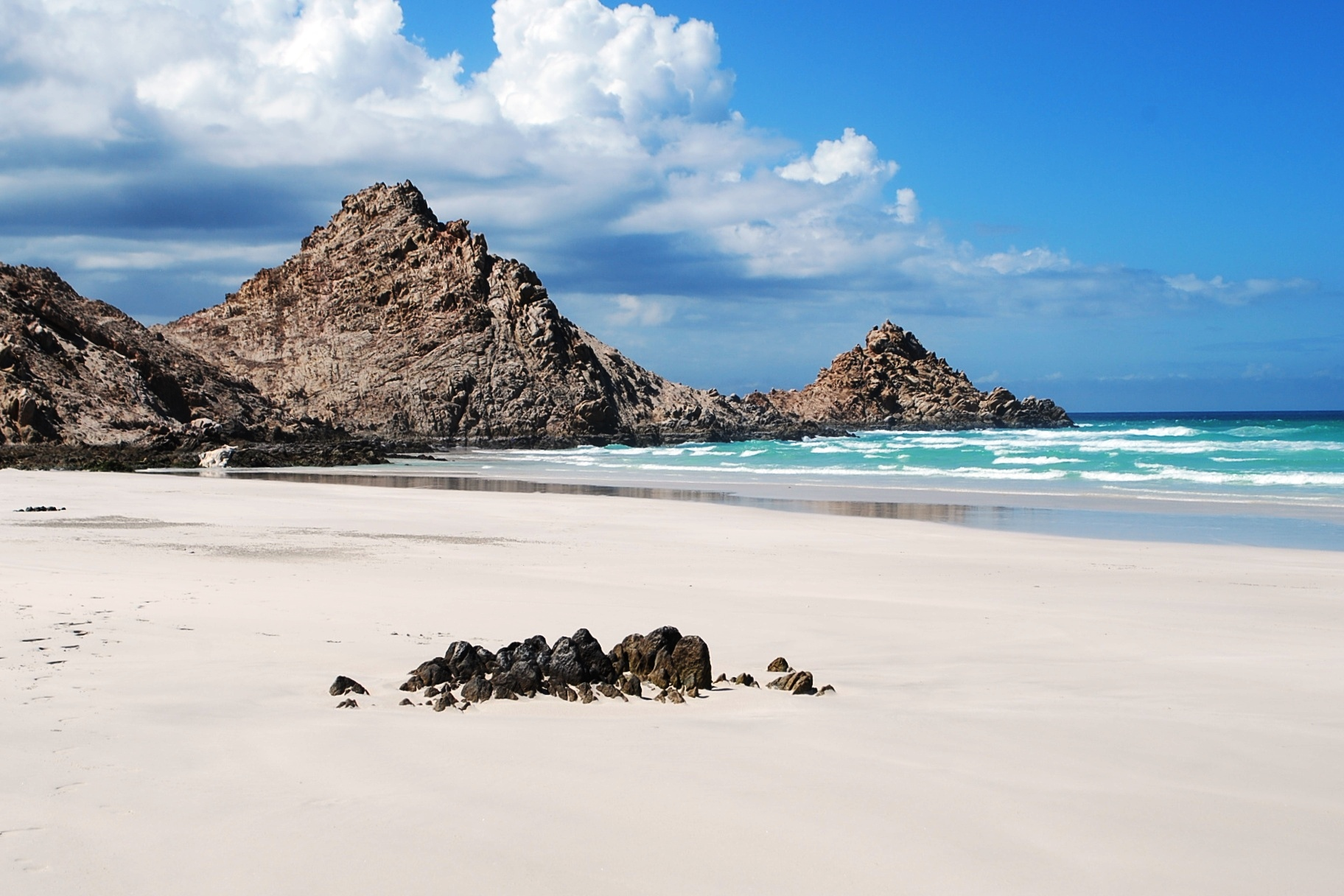
Detwah Lagoon, which would have been damaged by proposed road projects

The British explorers Theodore and Mabel Bent began their tour of the island from Qulensya in December 1896, leaving from Hadibu in February 1897.

=== 20th and 21st centuries ===
In 2003, a proposal by Yemen's public works authority was submitted to construct a road connecting Qulensya to the island's capital of Hadibu. This new construction would have violated Yemeni conservational law in place to protect the nearby Detwah Lagoon Nature Sanctuary, which the road would have cut through. After presidential intervention, the road was diverted around the sanctuary to follow the path of an already existing trail. More recent plans have also called for a road connecting Qulensya to the isolated fishing village of Neet to its southwest, which is home to approximately 300 seasonal fishermen who spend much of the year in Qulensya itself.

In December 2004, the island of Socotra was impacted by the 2004 Indian Ocean tsunami caused by an earthquake of at least 9.0 magnitude off the coast of Sumatra. The runup of the tsunami was roughly 2 m (6 ft 7 in) higher than usual in Qulensya, in line with estimates from across the island causing one fatality.

== Demographics ==
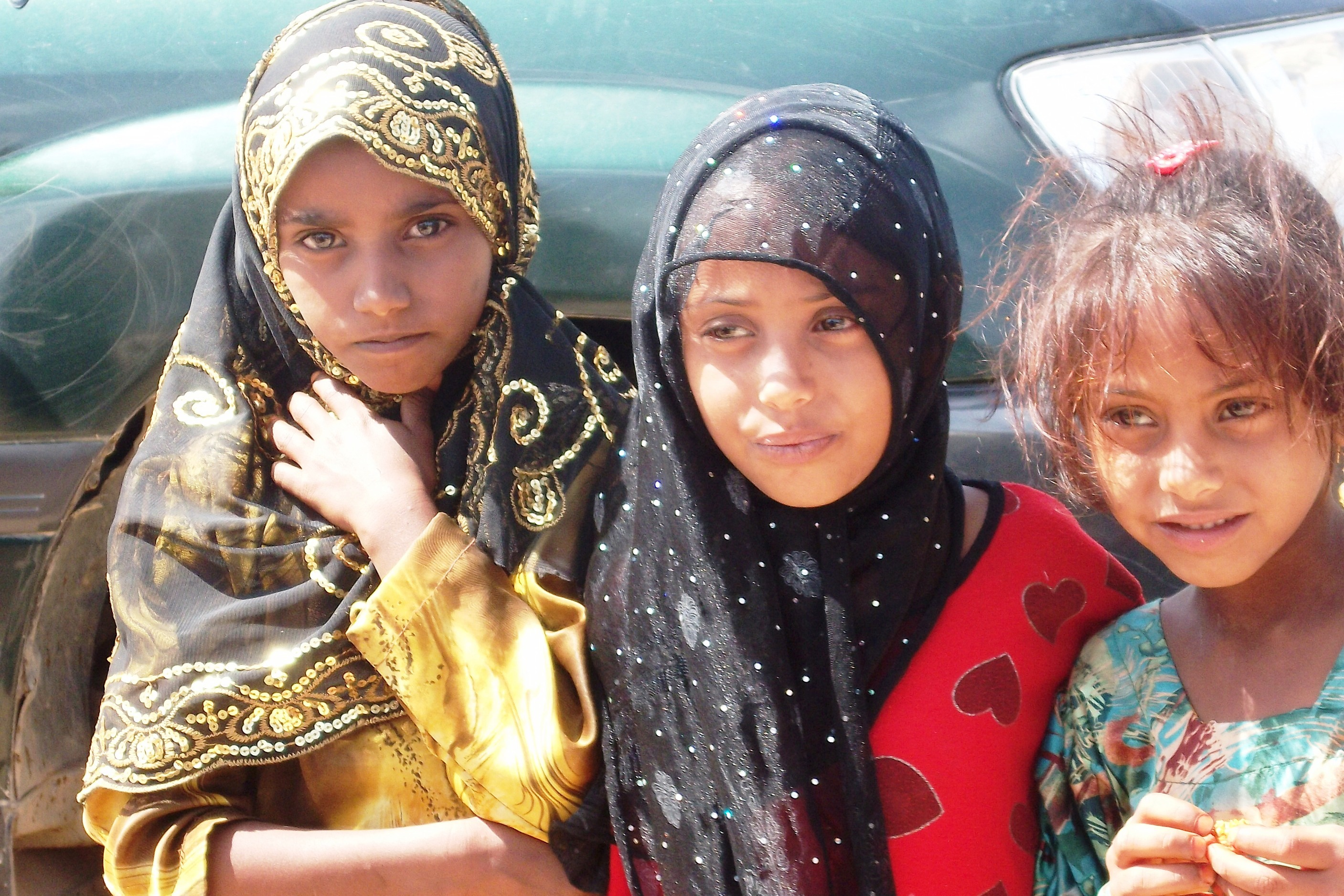
Village girls in Qulensya

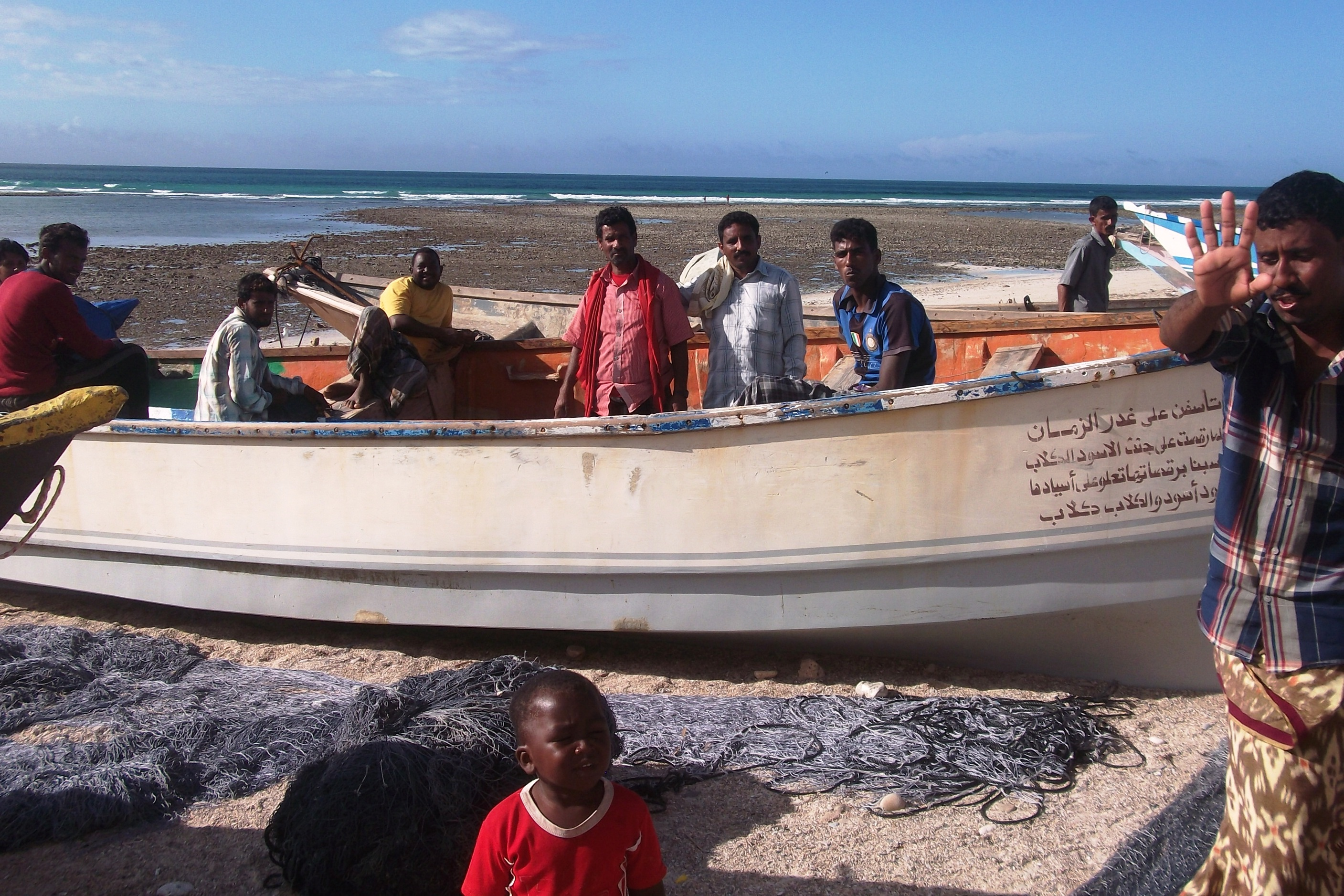
Subsistence fishermen from surrounding areas often live in Qulensya for part of the year

Qulensya has a population of approximately 4,000, second only to Hadibu in size on the island. Together, these two urban settlements make up nearly a third of Socotra's total population of 44,000. They are some of the only settlements on the island which have been inhabited by migrants from mainland Yemen, and represent a growing trend of urbanization in the northern coastal regions of Socotra.

== Geography ==
Qulensya lies at the northwestern corner of Socotra, at the end of the central Hajhir mountain range, which overlooks the town. Qulensya is situated in a relatively fertile plain compared to the rest of the island.

== See also ==
- List of cities in Socotra archipelago
