= Pristurus phillipsii =

Conservation status
- Least Concern (IUCN 3.1)

Scientific classification
- Kingdom: Animalia
- Phylum: Chordata
- Class: Reptilia
- Order: Squamata
- Suborder: Gekkota
- Family: Sphaerodactylidae
- Genus: Pristurus
- Species: P. phillipsii

Binomial name
- Pristurus phillipsii Boulenger, 1895

Species of lizard

Pristurus phillipsii, known commonly as Phillip's rock gecko or the Somali rock gecko, is a species of lizard in the family Sphaerodactylidae. The species is endemic to the Horn of Africa.

== Etymology ==
The specific name, phillipsii, is in honor of British naturalist Ethelbert Lort Phillips.

== Geographic range ==
P. phillipsii is found in Somalia. The Reptile Databases lists it also from Ethiopia.

== Reproduction ==
P. phillipsii is oviparous.
