= Pristurus somalicus =

Scientific classification
- Kingdom: Animalia
- Phylum: Chordata
- Class: Reptilia
- Order: Squamata
- Suborder: Gekkota
- Family: Sphaerodactylidae
- Genus: Pristurus
- Species: P. somalicus

Binomial name
- Pristurus somalicus Parker, 1932

Species of lizard

Pristurus somalicus, also known as Somali rock gecko or Somali semaphore gecko, is a species of lizard in the Sphaerodactylidae family found in Somalia and Ethiopia.
