= Pristurus insignis =

Conservation status
- Least Concern (IUCN 3.1)

Scientific classification
- Kingdom: Animalia
- Phylum: Chordata
- Class: Reptilia
- Order: Squamata
- Suborder: Gekkota
- Family: Sphaerodactylidae
- Genus: Pristurus
- Species: P. insignis

Binomial name
- Pristurus insignis Blanford, 1881

Species of lizard

Pristurus insignis, also known as Blanford's rock gecko, is a species of lizard in the Sphaerodactylidae family found on Socotra Island.
