= Detwah Lagoon =

Protected lagoon in Socotra, Yemen

- ديطواح لاجون (Arabic)
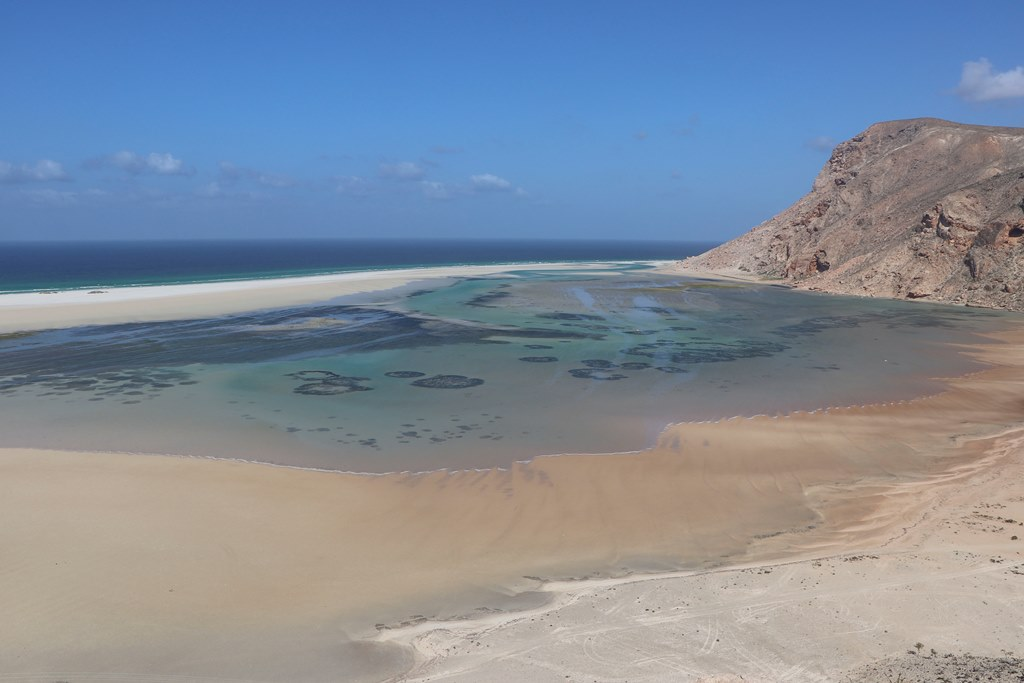
- View of Detwah Lagoon

- Location: Socotra, Yemen
- Coordinates: 12°42′20″N 53°30′24″E
- Type: Lagoon
- Part of: Gulf of Aden

Ramsar Wetland
- Official name: Detwah Lagoon
- Designated: 10 August 2007
- Reference no.: 1736

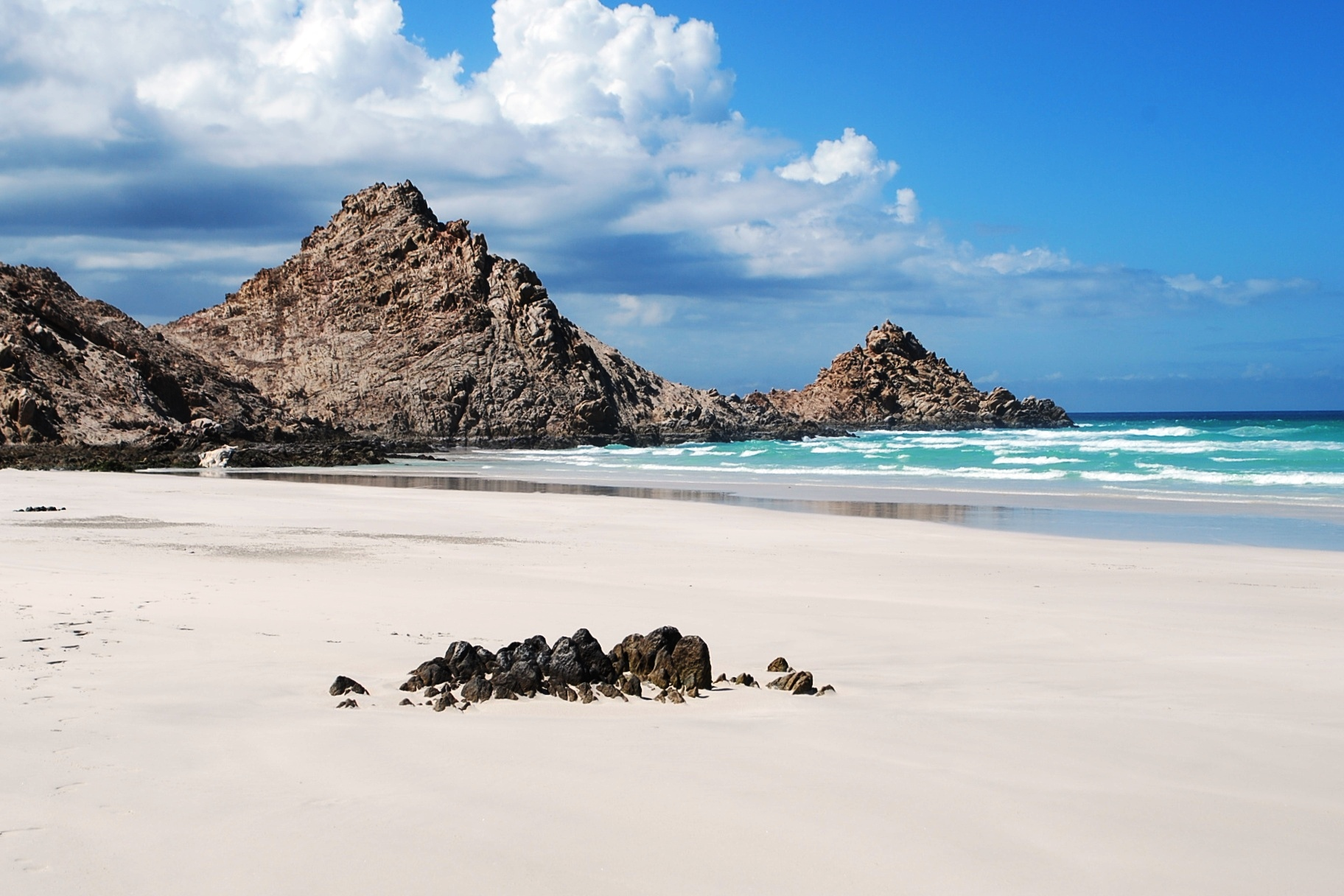
Qalansiyah Beach beside Detwah Lagoon

Detwah Lagoon (Arabic: ديطواح لاجون, also transliterated Ditwah Lagoon) is a lagoon on the coast of Socotra, Yemen. Located on the island's northwest coast near Qalansiyah, the saline lagoon connects to the Gulf of Aden, from which it is separated by a spit. It has been designated as a protected Ramsar site since 2007.

== Flora and fauna ==
The lagoon contains extensive seagrass meadows, and the shore hosts endemic plants including Croton socotranus and Jatropha unicostata. The seagrasses provide nursery habitats for juvenile fish, and the lagoon hosts vulnerable species, such as the reticulate whipray and bluespotted ribbontail ray. It is an important roosting and feeding area for waterbirds, and it serves as a breeding site for the Egyptian vulture and Socotra cormorant.

== Conservation ==
In 2003 the entire Socotra archipelago was designated as a UNESCO biosphere reserve in recognition of its value as a hotspot for biodiversity and endemism. Detwah Lagoon was declared Yemen's first and only Ramsar site on 10 August 2007, when Yemen acceded to the Ramsar Convention. In 2008 the archipelago was recognised as a UNESCO World Heritage Site.
