= Abd al Kuri =

Island in the Socotra Archipelago, Yemen

Native name: عبد الكوري
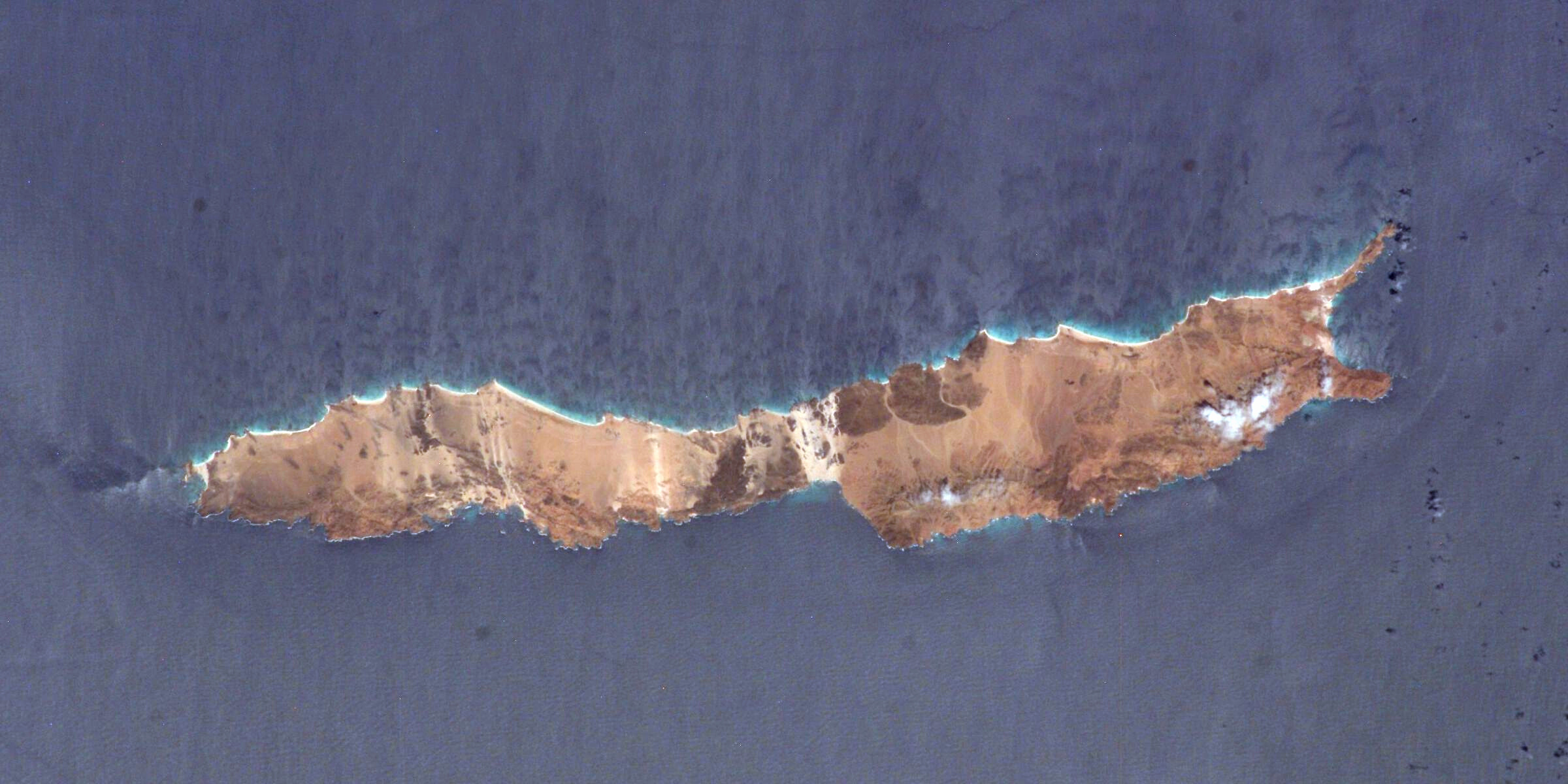
- Photograph by NASA

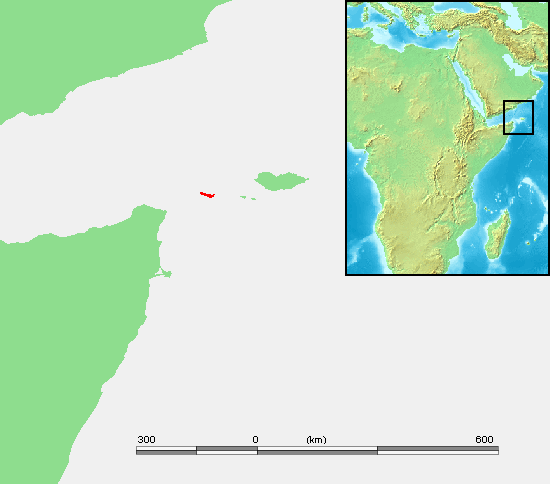

Geography
- Location: Guardafui Channel
- Coordinates: 12°11′8.9″N 52°14′18″E
- Archipelago: Socotra Archipelago
- Area: 133 km^{2} (51 sq mi)
- Length: 36 km (22.4 mi)
- Width: 5 km (3.1 mi)
- Highest point: Mount Ṣāliḥ

Administration
- Yemen
- Governorate: Socotra Governorate
- Capital city: Kilmia

Demographics
- Population: 450
- Pop. density: 3.38/km^{2} (8.75/sq mi)

Abd al Kuri (Arabic: عبد الكوري) sometimes spelt Adal Kuri or Abdal Kuri is a rocky island in the Guardafui Channel. As a part of the Socotra Archipelago Governorate of Yemen, it lies about 65 miles (105 km) southwest of the main island of Socotra. Its terrain primarily consists of granite and diorite covered with limestone.

== Geography ==
The terrain of Abd al-Kuri is semi-arid, with little vegetation; annual monsoons, originating from the Indian Subcontinent, deliver vital precipitation each year. Two ranges of large hills, separating near the island's centre, run nearly the entire east-west length of the island. The northern coast consists mostly of sandy beaches with a few rocky outcrops and cliffs, while the southern coast consists of high, steep cliffs. The island's highest point, Mount Ṣāliḥ, reaches an altitude of over 700 metres (2,300 feet). The total area of Abd al-Kuri is 133 km^{2} (51 sq mi). Most of its inhabitants subsist on fishing. Kilmia is the main village.

== Flora and fauna ==
Abd al-Kuri has a number of endemic plant species, including the subshrub species Ruellia kuriensis and Convolvulus kossmatii and the succulent Euphorbia abdelkuri.

The island is home to an endemic bird, the Abd al-Kuri sparrow (Passer hemileucus), which has an estimated population of fewer than 1,000 individuals. The island has been recognised as an Important Bird Area (IBA), by BirdLife International, for the presence of the endemic sparrow as well as for breeding colonies of the red-billed tropicbird (Phaethon aethereus), sooty gull (Ichthyaetus hemprichii) and Persian shearwater (Puffinus persicus).

Two species of lizards native to Abd al-Kuri, the Socotran wall lizard (Mesalina kuri) and the Abd al-Kuri rock gecko (Pristurus abdelkuri), are named after the island. Additional reptiles present include the Abd al-Kuri skink (Trachylepis cristinae), the sharpnose leaf-toed gecko (Hemidactylus oxyrhinus) and the Socotra leaf-toed gecko (Hemidactylus forbesii).

== History ==
=== 1800s ===
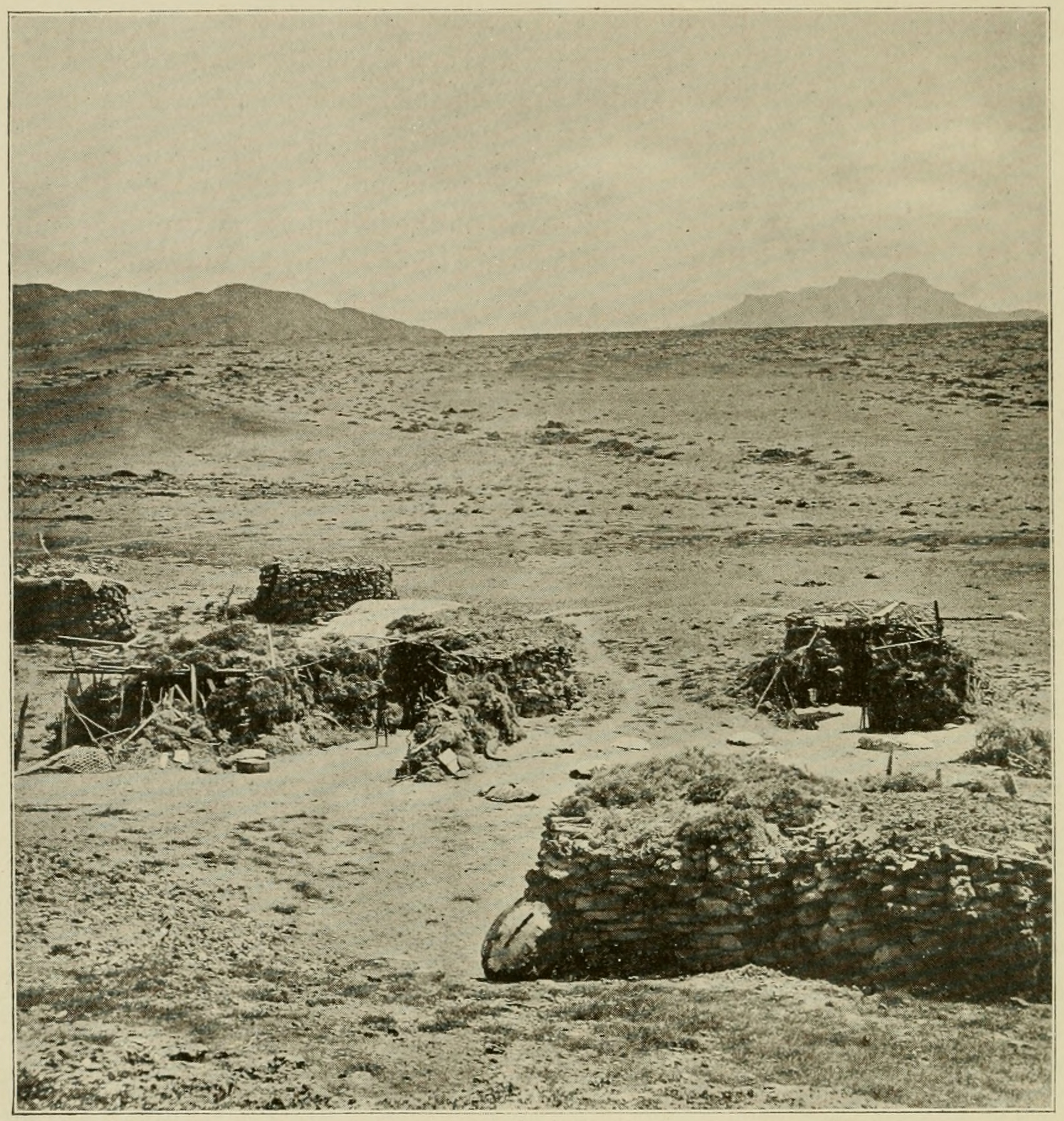
Native dwellings, end of 19th century

Thomas Fellowes was sent on HMS Briton in 1872 to Abd al Kuri, alongside Socotra, by British authorities to see if it would be a suitable place to settle liberated slaves. Fellowes decided against it, citing the poor living conditions on both islands.

=== 2020s ===
In June 2020, the Socotra Governorate, which includes Abd al Kuri, was taken control of and subsequently administered by the Southern Transitional Council during the events surrounding the 2014 Yemeni civil war.

Work to construct an airfield on the island was started in 2021.

In June 2022, the pro-Houthi Yemen Press Agency (YPA) reported on the alleged expulsion and forced evictions at gunpoint of residents from their villages on the island of Abd Al Kuri in the Socotra archipelago claiming that a military base hosting Israeli and Emirati forces was constructed.

In March 2024, the airfield appeared on satellite imagery of the island with an array of stones that can be seen from a satellite stating "I love UAE." The UAE replied to an Associated Press inquiry about the imagery that the presence of UAE on Socotra is based on humanitarian grounds and is performed in cooperation with Yemeni and local authorities. On 17 January 2025, the airport was seen to be nearly completed after analysis of satellite photos was performed by the Associated Press.

== Demographics ==
Fewer than 400 individuals reside on the island. Its inhabitants speak a unique dialect of Soqotri language.

== Map ==
Topographic map of Socotra archipelago; Abd al-Kuri at bottom left

== See also ==
- List of islands of Yemen
- Socotra archipelago
