= Sanaa =

Capital and largest city of Yemen

Sanaa صَنْعَاء
- Capital city
- Sanaa Municipality أَمَانَة ٱلْعَاصِمَة (Arabic)
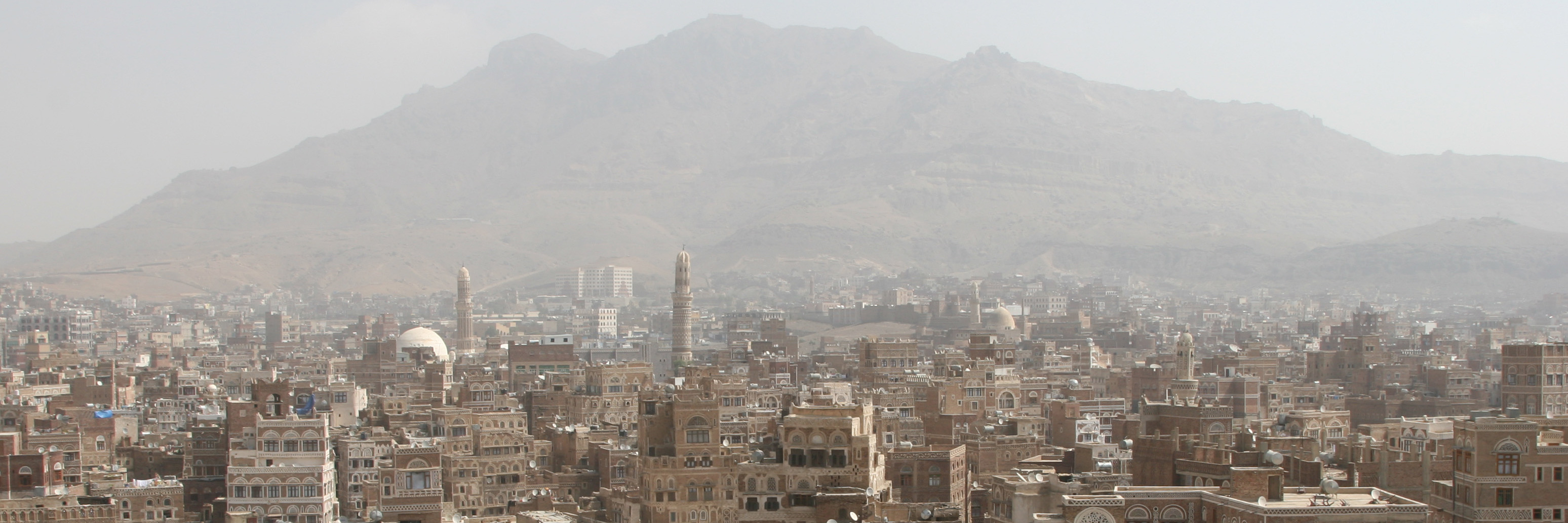
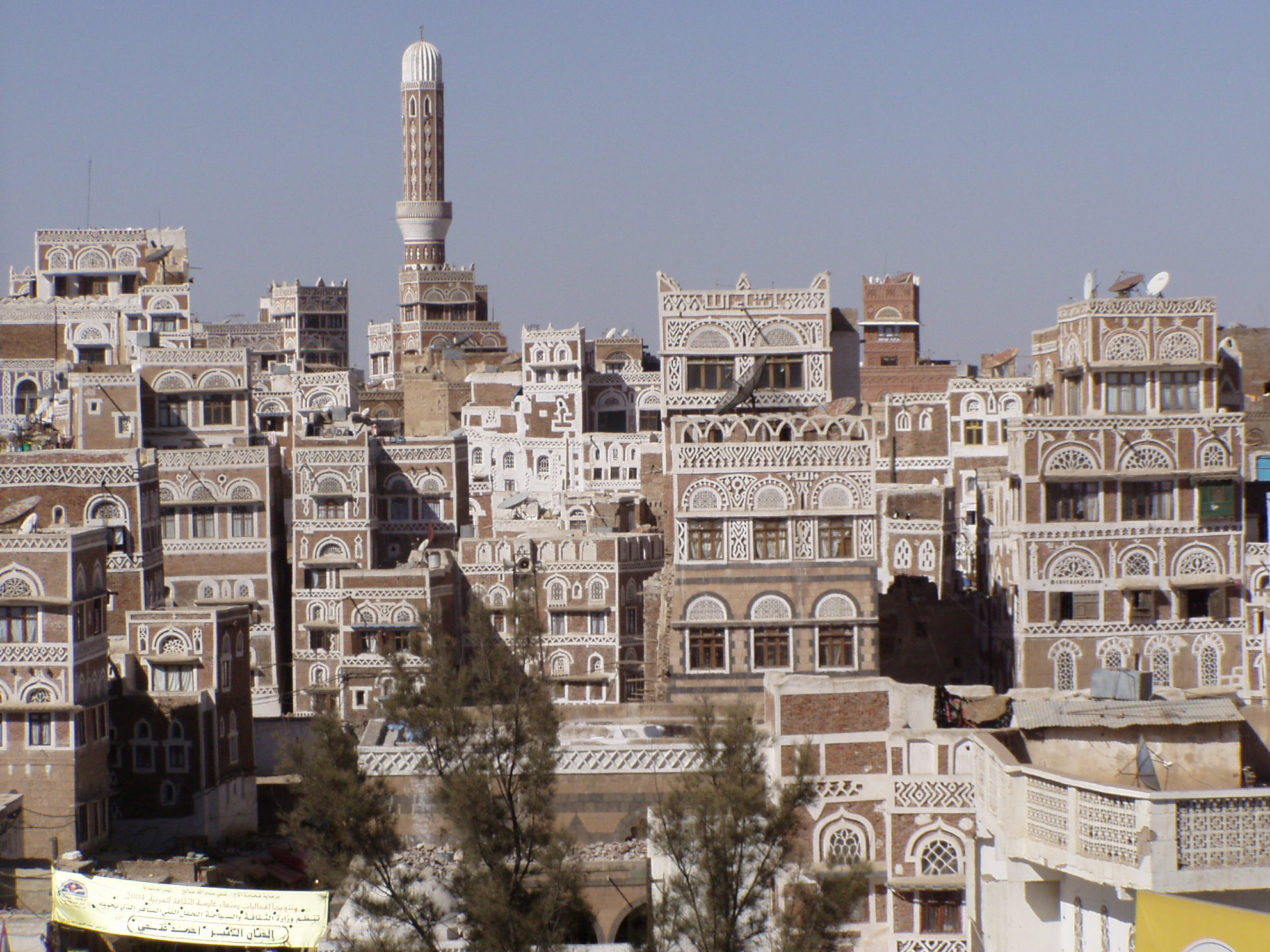
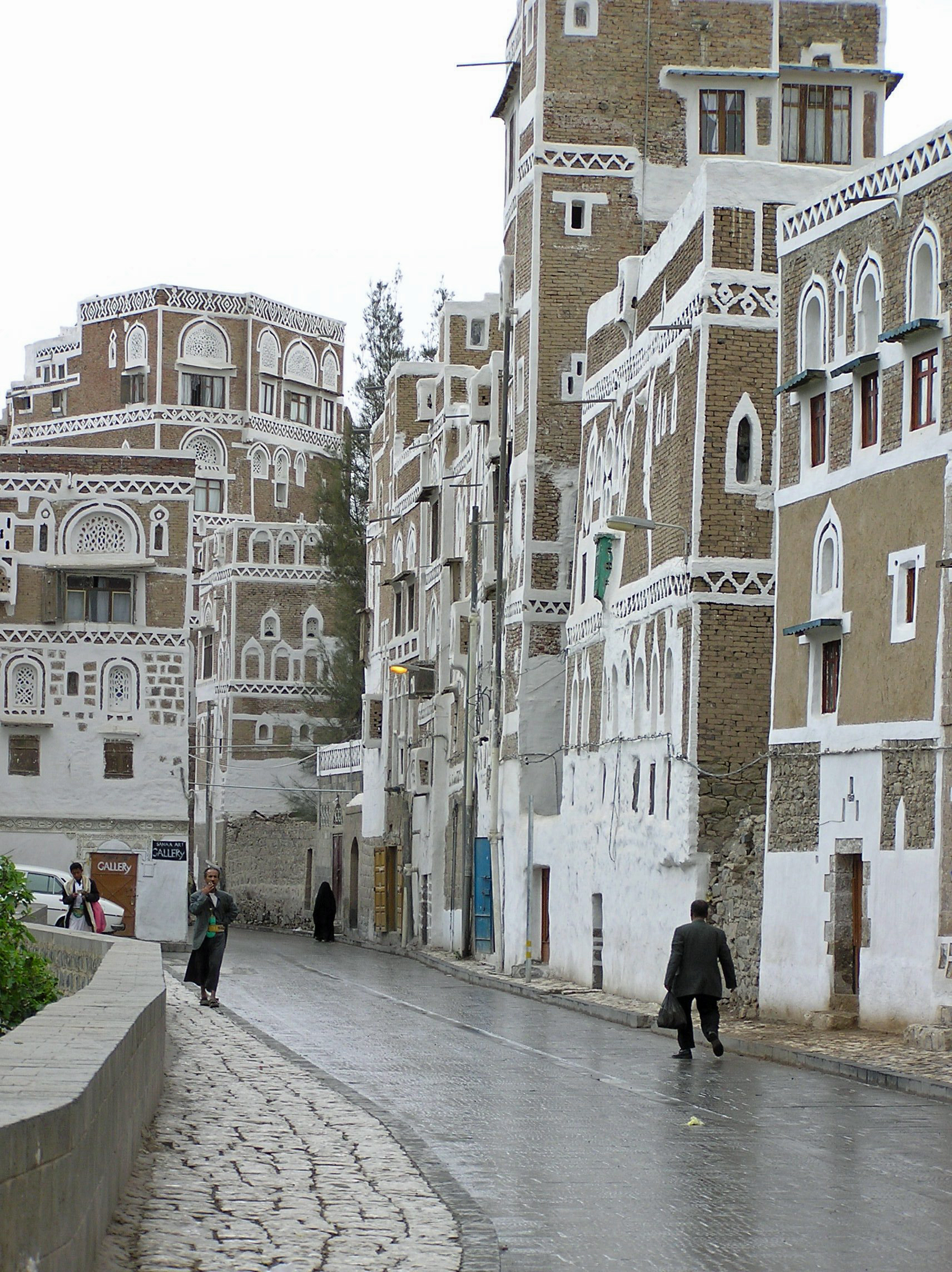
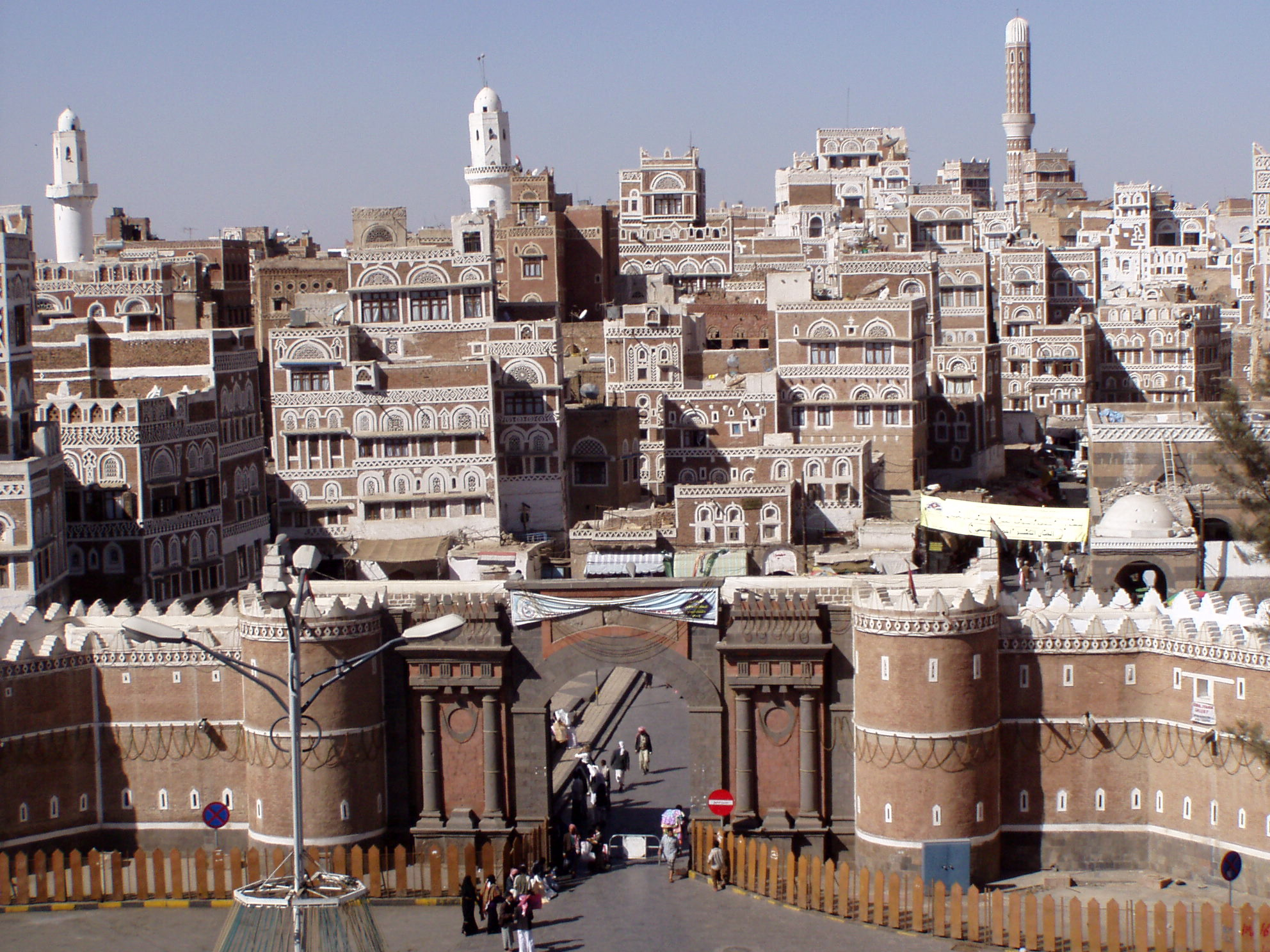
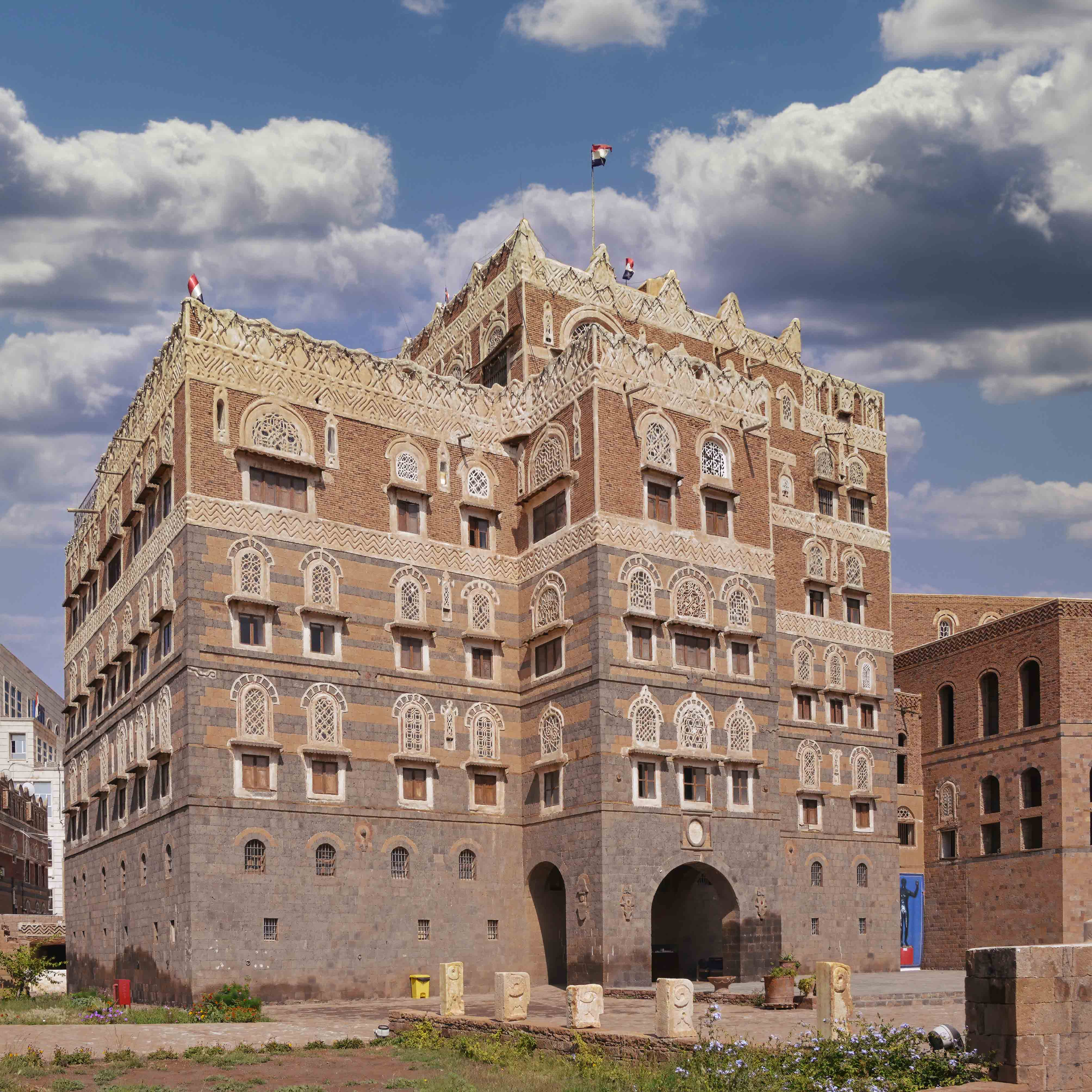
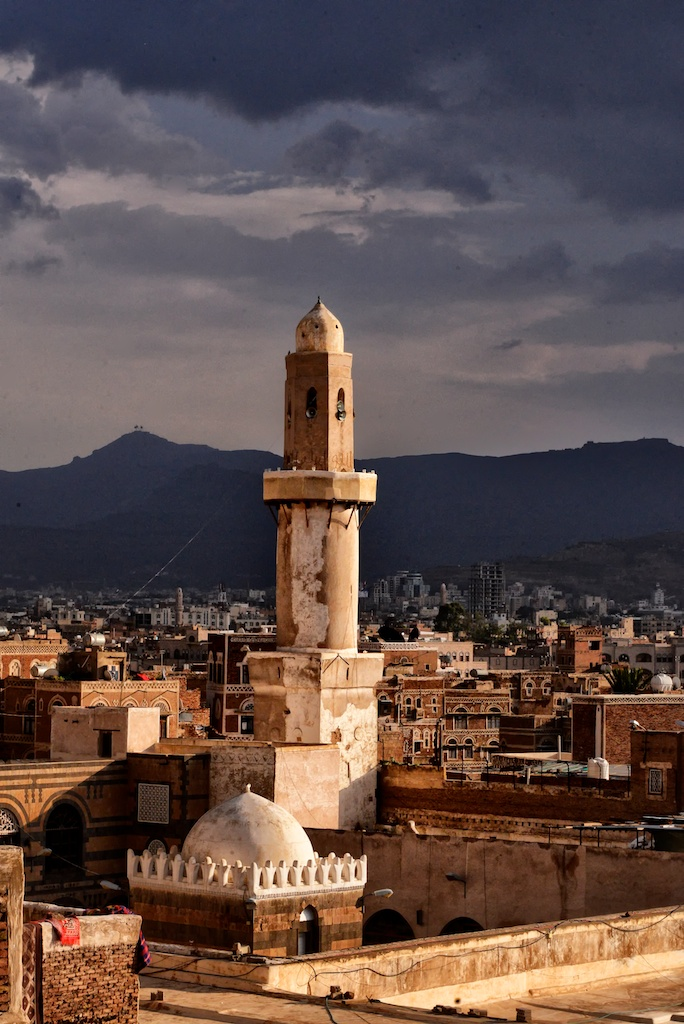
- The skyline of the Old City of Sanaa Architecture of the old city Al-Saleh Mosque Rainy day in Sanaa Bab al Yemen National Museum of Yemen Great Mosque of Sanaa

- Location of Sanaa in Yemen Sanaa (West and Central Asia) Sanaa (Asia) Sanaa (Earth)
- Coordinates: 15°20′54″N 44°12′23″E
- Country: Yemen
- Amanah: Amanat Al-Asemah
- Control: Houthi movement

Area
  - Total: 126 km^{2} (49 sq mi)
- Elevation: 2,250 m (7,380 ft)

Population (2017)
  - Total: 2,545,000 ▲
  - Estimate (2024): 3,407,814 ▲
  - Rank: 1st in Yemen; 13th in the Arab world
  - Density: 20,320/km^{2} (52,600/sq mi)
- Demonym(s): Sanaani, San'ani
- Time zone: UTC+03:00 (AST)
- Website: capitalsanaa.gov.ye

Sanaa, (Note: English: /səˈnɑː/ sə-NAH, also spelled Sana'a, San'a' and Sana; Arabic: صَنْعَاء, romanised: Ṣanʿāʾ, pronounced [sˤɑnʕaːʔ], Sanaani Arabic: [ˈsˤɑnʕɑ]; Old South Arabian: 𐩮𐩬𐩲𐩥, romanised: Ṣnʿw.) officially the Sanaa Municipality, (Note: Arabic: أَمَانَة ٱلْعَاصِمَة, romanised: ʾAmānat al-ʿĀṣimah, lit. 'Capital Municipality'.) is the capital and largest city of Yemen. The city is the capital of the Sanaa Governorate, but is not part of the governorate, as it forms a separate administrative unit. At an elevation of 2,300 metres (7,500 ft), Sanaa is the seventh highest capital city in the world and is situated between the Sarawat Mountains of Jabal An-Nabi Shu'ayb and Jabal Tiyal, considered the highest mountains in the Arabian Peninsula and one of the highest in the Middle East.

Sanaa has a population of approximately 3,300,000 (2023), making it Yemen's largest city. As of 2020, the greater Sanaa urban area makes up about 10% of Yemen's total population. The Old City of Sanaa, a UNESCO World Heritage Site, has a distinctive architectural character, most notably expressed in its multi-story buildings decorated with geometric patterns. Al-Saleh Mosque, the largest in the country, is located in the southern outskirts of the city.

In September 2014, the Houthis captured Sanaa from the government of President Abdrabbuh Mansur Hadi. Since then, the internationally recognized Yemeni government has moved the seat to Aden, the former capital of South Yemen. Aden was declared the temporary capital by then-president Hadi in March 2015.

== Toponymy ==
The first known text in the Musnad script that mentions Sanaa dates back to the 5th century BCE and it is mentioned as ṣnʿw, which is derived from the Sabaic word maṣna'a "fortress."

== History ==
=== Ancient period ===
The city of Sanaa was founded by the Kingdom of Saba in the 1st century CE as a secondary capital, with the primary capital since the origins of the civilisation being at the oasis of Marib. The name Sanaa is probably derived from the Sabaic root ṣnʿ, meaning "well-fortified". The name is attested in old Sabaean inscriptions, mostly from the 3rd century CE, as ṣnʿw. In the present day, a popular folk etymology says that the name Sanaa refers to "the excellence of its trades and crafts (perhaps the feminine form of the Arabic adjective aṣnaʿ)".

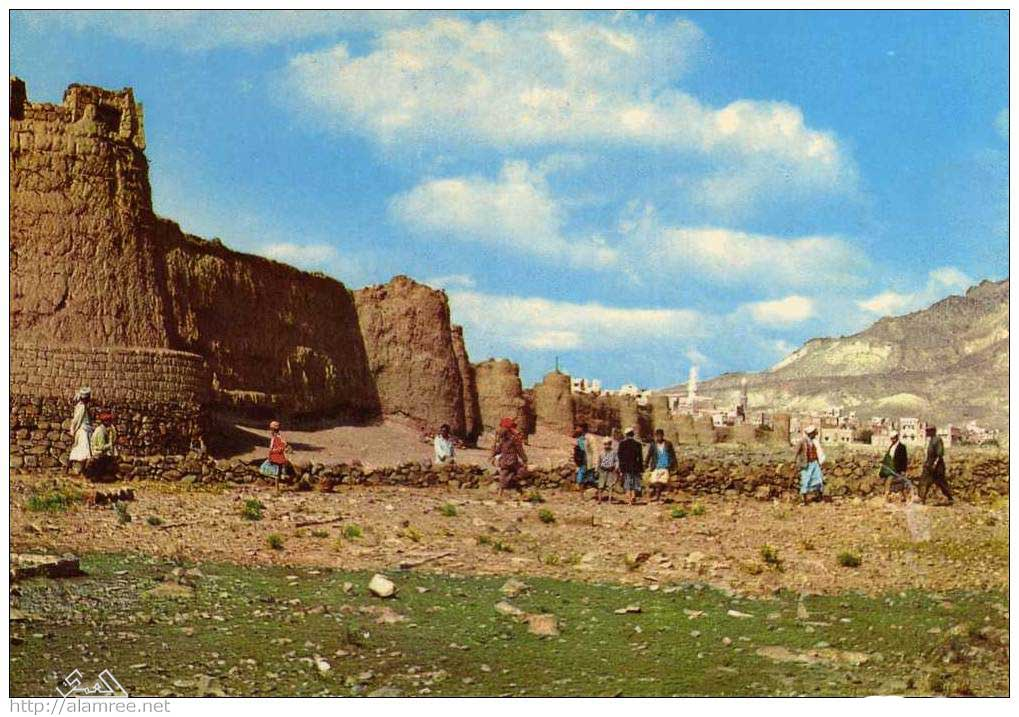
The walls of Sanaa in the 1950s

Sanaa appears to have been an important military centre under the Sabaeans. They used it as a base for their expeditions against the kingdom of Himyar further south, and several inscriptions "announce a triumphant return to Sanaa from the wars." Sanaa is referred to in these inscriptions both as a town (hgr) and as a maram (mrm), which, according to A. F. L. Beeston, indicates "a place to which access is prohibited or restricted, no matter whether for religious or for other reasons". The Sabaean inscriptions also mention the Ghumdan Palace by name.

When King Yousef Athar (or Dhu Nuwas), the last of the Himyarite kings, was in power, Sanaa was also the capital of the Axumite viceroys. Later tradition also holds that the Abyssinian conqueror Abrahah built a Christian church in Sanaa.

According to Islamic sources, Sanaa was founded at the base of the mountains of Jabal Nuqum by Shem, the son of Noah, after the latter's death. The 10th-century Arab historian al-Hamdani wrote that Sanaa's ancient name was Azāl, which is not recorded in any contemporary Sabaean inscriptions. The name Azāl has been connected to Uzal, a son of Qahtan, a great-grandson of Shem, in the biblical accounts of the Book of Genesis.

Al-Hamdani wrote that Sanaa was walled by the Sabaeans under their ruler Sha'r Awtar, who also arguably built the Ghumdan Palace in the city. Because of its location, Sanaa has served as an urban hub for the surrounding tribes of the region and as a nucleus of regional trade in southern Arabia. It was positioned at the crossroad of two major ancient trade routes linking Ma'rib in the east to the Red Sea in the west.

=== Islamic era ===
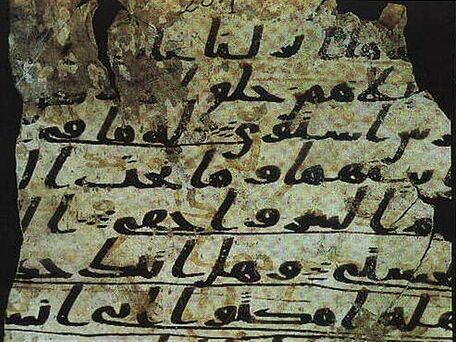
The Sanaa manuscript, found in Sanaa in 1972, is one of the oldest Quranic manuscripts in existence.

From the era of Muhammad (c. 622 CE) until the founding of independent sub-states in many parts of the Yemen Islamic Caliphate, Sanaa persisted as the governing seat. The Caliph's deputy ran the affairs of one of Yemen's three Makhalif: Mikhlaf Sanaʽa, Mikhlaf al-Janad, and Mikhlaf Hadhramaut. The city of Sanaa regularly regained an important status, and all Yemenite States competed to control it.

Imam Al-Shafi'i, the 8th-century Islamic jurist and founder of the Shafi'i school of jurisprudence, visited Sanaa several times. He praised the city, writing La budda min Ṣanʻāʼ, or "Sanaa must be seen." In the 9th–10th centuries, it was written of the city that "the Yem separate from each other, empty of ordure, without smell or evil smells, because of the hard concrete [adobe and cob, probably] and fine pastureland and clean places to walk." Later in the 10th century, the Persian geographer Ibn Rustah wrote of Sanaa, "It is the city of Yemen; there cannot be found ... a city greater, more populous or more prosperous, of nobler origin or with more delicious food than it."

In 1062, Sanaa was taken over by the Sulayhid dynasty led by Ali al-Sulayhi and his wife, the popular Queen Asma. He made the city capital of his relatively small kingdom, which also included the Haraz Mountains. The Sulayhids were aligned with the Ismaili Muslim-leaning Fatimid Caliphate of Egypt, rather than the Baghdad-based Abbasid Caliphate that most of Arabia followed. Al-Sulayhi ruled for about 20 years but he was assassinated by his principal local rivals, the Zabid-based Najahids. Following his death, al-Sulayhi's daughter, Arwa al-Sulayhi, inherited the throne. She withdrew from Sanaa, transferring the Sulayhid capital to Jibla, where she ruled much of Yemen from 1067 to 1138. As a result of the Sulayhid departure, the Hamdanid dynasty took control of Sanaa. Like the Sulayhids, the Hamdanids were Isma'ilis.

In 1173, Saladin, the Ayyubid sultan of Egypt, sent his brother Turan-Shah on an expedition to conquer Yemen. The Ayyubids gained control of Sanaa in 1175 and united the various Yemeni tribal states, except for the northern mountains controlled by the Zaydi imams, into one entity. The Ayyubids switched the country's official religious allegiance to the Sunni Muslim Abbasids. During the reign of the Ayyubid emir Tughtekin ibn Ayyub, the city underwent significant improvements. These included the incorporation of the garden lands on the western bank of the Sa'ilah, known as Bustan al-Sultan, where the Ayyubids built one of their palaces. However, Ayyubid control of Sanaa was never very consistent, and they only occasionally exercised direct authority over the city. Instead, they chose Taiz as their capital, while Aden was their principal income-producing city.

While the Rasulids controlled most of Yemen, followed by their successors, the Tahirids, Sanaa largely remained in the political orbit of the Zaydi imams from 1323 to 1454 and outside the former two dynasties' rule. The Mamelukes arrived in Yemen in 1517.

=== Ottoman era ===
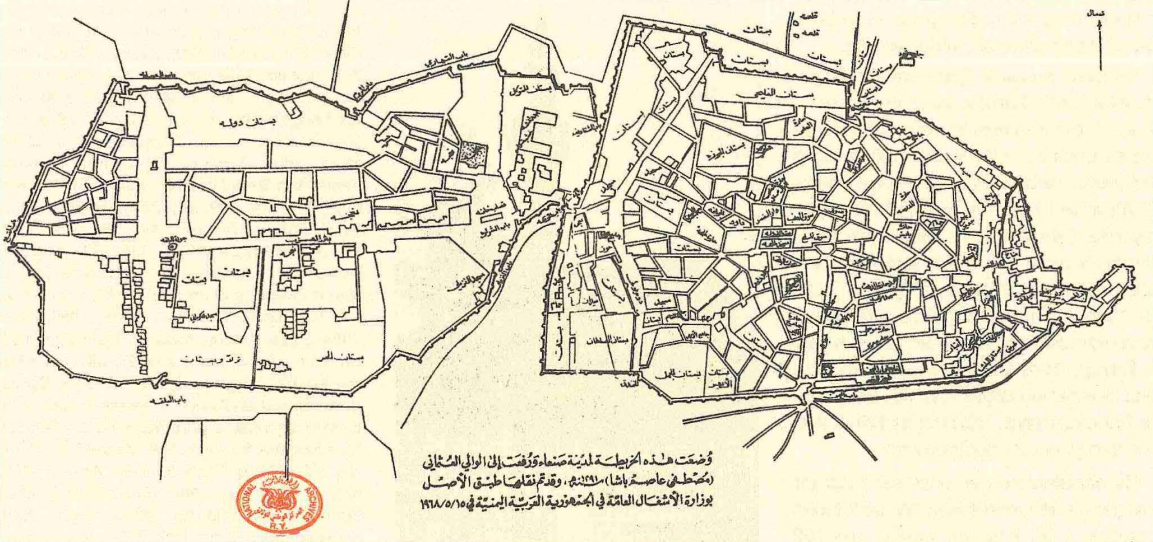
Ottoman map of Sanaa, 1874

The Ottoman Empire entered Yemen in 1538, when Suleiman the Magnificent was Sultan. Under the military leadership of Özdemir Pasha, the Ottomans conquered Sanaa in 1547. With Ottoman approval, European captains based in the Yemeni port towns of Aden and Mocha frequented Sanaa to maintain special privileges and capitulations for their trade. In 1602, the local Zaydi imams led by Imam al-Mu'ayyad reasserted their control over the area, and forced out Ottoman troops in 1629. Although the Ottomans fled during al-Mu'ayyad's reign, his predecessor al-Mansur al-Qasim had already vastly weakened the Ottoman army in Sanaa and Yemen. Consequently, European traders were stripped of their previous privileges.

The Zaydi imams maintained their rule over Sanaa until the mid-19th century when the Ottomans relaunched their campaign to control the region. In 1835, Ottoman troops arrived on the Yemeni coast under the guise of Muhammad Ali of Egypt's troops. They did not capture Sanaa until 1872, when their troops led by Ahmed Muhtar Pasha entered the city. The Ottoman Empire instituted the Tanzimat reforms throughout the lands they governed.

In Sanaa, city planning was initiated for the first time, new roads were built, and schools and hospitals were established. The reforms were rushed by the Ottomans to solidify their control of Sanaa to compete with an expanding Egypt, British influence in Aden, and imperial Italian and French influence along the coast of Somalia, particularly in the towns of Djibouti and Berbera. The modernisation reforms in Sanaa were still very limited, however.

=== North Yemen period ===
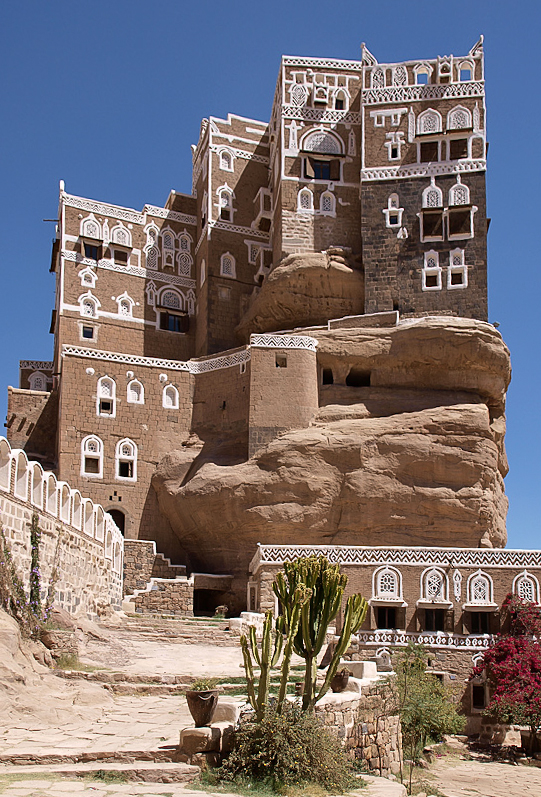
Dar al-Hajar, the residence of Imam Yahya in the Wādī Ẓahr (وادى ظهر) near Sanaa

In 1904, as Ottoman influence was waning in Yemen, Imam Yahya of the Zaydi Imams took power in Sanaa. In a bid to secure North Yemen's independence, Yahya embarked on a policy of isolationism, avoiding international and Arab world politics, cracking down on embryonic liberal movements, not contributing to the development of infrastructure in Sanaa and elsewhere and closing down the Ottoman girls' school. As a consequence of Yahya's measures, Sanaa increasingly became a hub of anti-government organisation and intellectual revolt.

In the 1930s, several organisations opposing or demanding reform of the Zaydi imamate sprung up in the city, particularly Fatat al-Fulayhi, a group of various Yemeni Muslim scholars based in Sanaa's Fulayhi Madrasa, and Hait al-Nidal ("Committee of the Struggle.") By 1936, most of the leaders of these movements were imprisoned. In 1941, another group based in the city, the Shabab al-Amr bil-Maruf wal-Nahian al-Munkar, called for a nahda ("renaissance") in the country as well as the establishment of a parliament with Islam as the instrument of Yemeni revival. Yahya largely repressed the Shabab and most of its leaders were executed following his son Imam Ahmad's inheritance of power in 1948. That year, Sanaa was replaced with Taiz as capital following Ahmad's new residence there. Most government offices followed suit. A few years later, most of the city's Jewish population emigrated to Israel.

Ahmad began a process of gradual economic and political liberalisation, but by 1961, Sanaa was witnessing major demonstrations and riots demanding quicker reform and change. Pro-republican officers in the North Yemeni military sympathetic of Gamal Abdel Nasser of Egypt's government and pan-Arabist policies staged a coup overthrowing the Imamate government in September 1962, a week after Ahmad's death. Sanaa's role as a capital was restored afterward. Neighbouring Saudi Arabia opposed this development and actively supported North Yemen's rural tribes, pitting large parts of the country against the urban and largely pro-republican inhabitants of Sanaa. The North Yemen Civil War resulted in the destruction of some parts of the city's ancient heritage and continued until 1968, when a deal between the republicans and the royalists was reached, establishing a presidential system. Instability in Sanaa continued due to continuing coups and political assassinations until the situation in the country stabilised in the late 1970s.

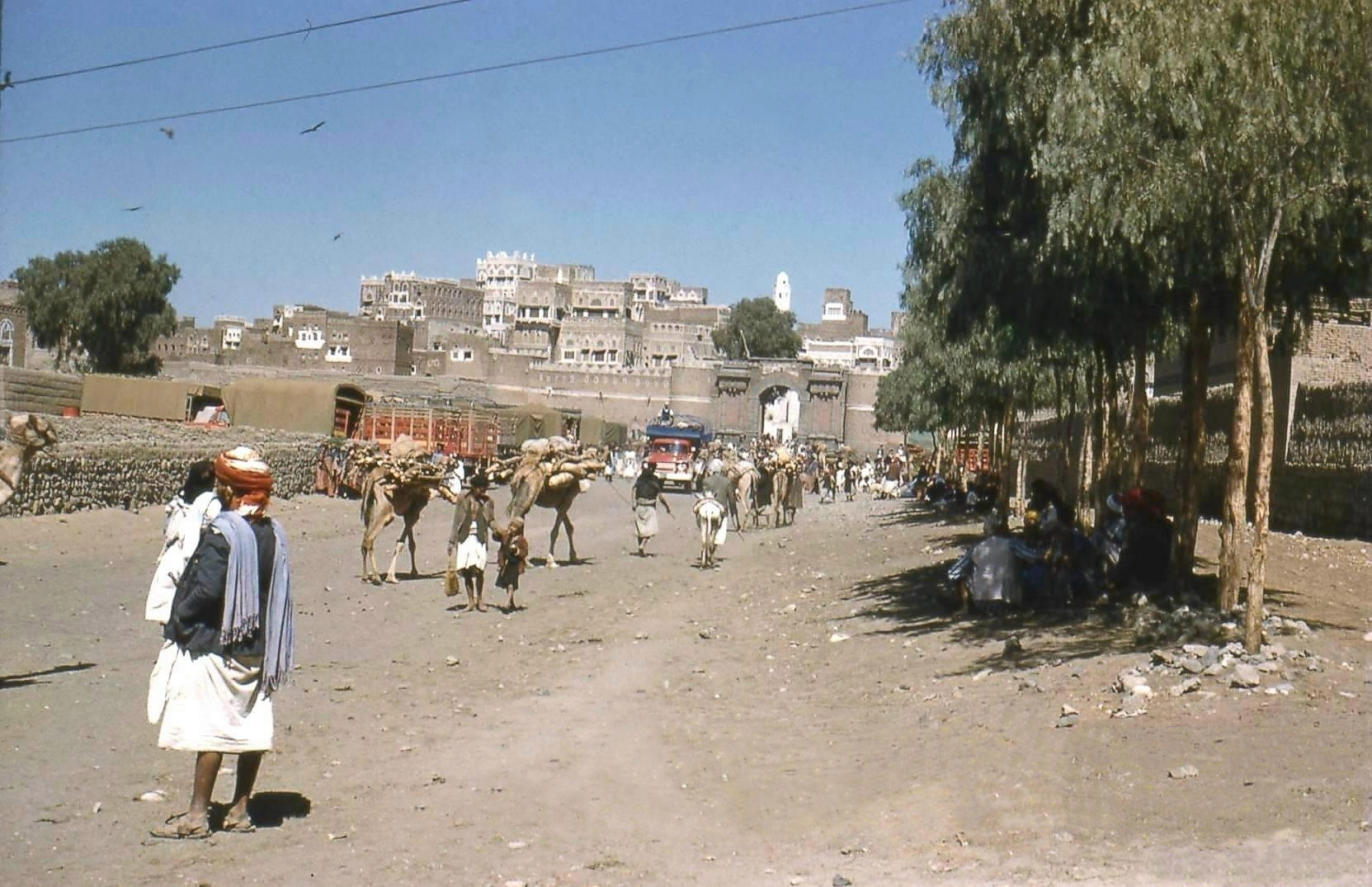
A 1958 view of Taizz Road, just outside the Bab al-Yaman

The new government's modernisation projects changed the face of Sanaa: the new Tahrir Square was built on what had formerly been the former imam's palace grounds, and new buildings were constructed on the north and northwest of the city. This was accompanied by the destruction of several of the old city's gates, as well as sections of the wall around it.

After the end of the civil war in 1970, Sanaa began to expand outward. This was a period of prosperity in Yemen, partly due to the massive migration of Yemeni workers to the Gulf states and their subsequent sending of money back home. At first, most of the new development was concentrated around central areas like al-Tahrir, the modern centre; Bi'r al-Azab, the Ottoman quarter; and Bab al-Yaman, the old southern gate. However, this soon shifted to the city's outskirts, where an influx of immigrants from the countryside established new neighbourhoods. Two areas in particular experienced major growth during this period: first, the area along Taizz Road in the south, and second, a broader area on the west side of the city, between Bi'r al-Azab and the new avenue called Sittin. A new ring road, built in the 1970s on the recommendation of the United Nations Development Programme, encouraged land speculation and further contributed to the rapid expansion of Sanaa.

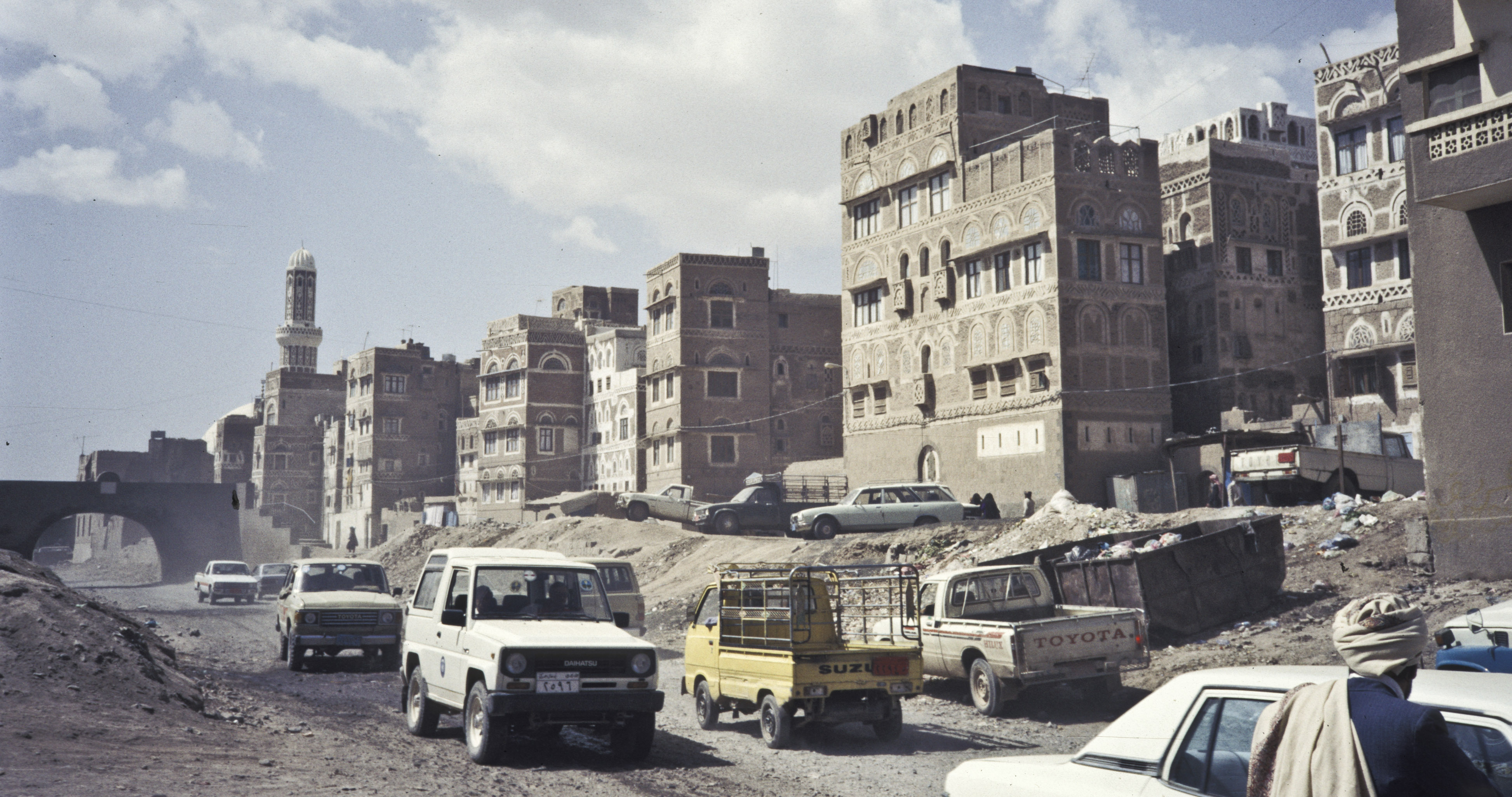
View of Wadi as-Sailah street in 1988, with the minaret of the al-Mahdi Mosque visible in the background

Sanaa's new areas were physically different from the quarters of the old city. Many of the Yemenis who had migrated to the Gulf states had worked in construction, where they had become well-acquainted with Western and Egyptian techniques. When they returned to Yemen, they brought those techniques with them. New construction consisted of concrete and concrete block houses with multi-lite windows and plaster decorations, laid out in a grid pattern. Their amenities, including independence from extended families and the possibility of owning a car, attracted many families from the old city, and they moved to the new districts in growing numbers. Meanwhile, the old city, with its unpaved streets, poor drainage, lack of water and sewer systems, and litter (from the use of manufactured products, which was becoming increasingly common), was becoming increasingly unattractive to residents. Disaster struck in the late 1970s — water pipes were laid to bring water into the old city, but there was no way to pipe it out, resulting in huge amounts of groundwater building up in the old city. This destabilised building foundations and led to many houses collapsing.

=== 21st century ===
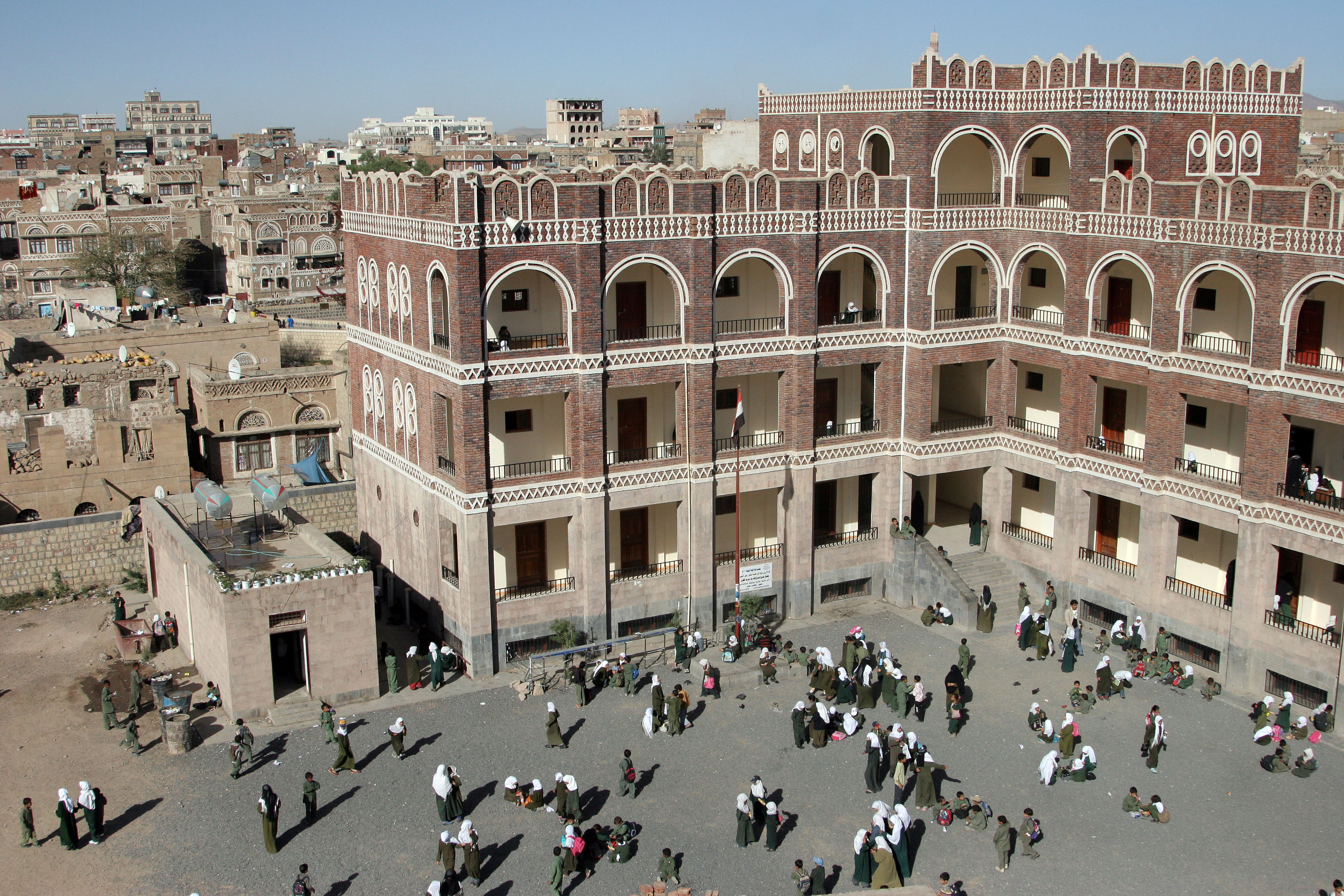
Attabari Elementary School, Old City of Sanaa

Following the unification of Yemen, Sanaa was designated capital of the new Republic of Yemen. It houses the presidential palace, the parliament, the supreme court, and the country's government ministries. The largest source of employment is provided by governmental civil service. Due to massive rural immigration, Sanaa has grown far outside its Old City, but this has placed a huge strain on the city's underdeveloped infrastructure and municipal services, particularly water.

Sanaa was chosen as the 2004 Arab Cultural Capital by the Arab League. In 2008, the Al Saleh Mosque was completed. It holds over 40,000 worshippers.

In 2011, Sanaa, as the Yemeni capital, was the centre of the Yemeni Revolution, in which President Ali Abdullah Saleh was ousted. Between May and November, the city was a battleground in what became known as the 2011 Battle of Sanaa.

On 21 May 2012, Sanaa was attacked by a suicide bomber, resulting in the deaths of at least 96 soldiers.

On 23 January 2013, a drone strike near Al-Masna'ah village killed two civilians, according to a report issued by Radhya Al-Mutawakel and Abdulrasheed Al-Faqih and Open Societies Foundations.

=== Houthi control (2014–present) ===
On 21 September 2014, during the Houthi insurgency, the Houthis seized control of Sanaa.

On 12 June 2015, Saudi-led airstrikes targeting Shiite rebels and their allies in Yemen destroyed historic houses in the middle of the capital. A UNESCO World Heritage Site was severely damaged.

On 8 October 2016, Saudi-led airstrikes targeted a hall in Sanaa where a funeral was taking place. At least 140 people were killed and about 600 were wounded. After initially denying it was behind the attack, the Coalition's Joint Incidents Assessment Team admitted that it had bombed the hall but claimed that this attack had been a mistake caused by bad information.

In May 2017, according to the International Committee of the Red Cross, an outbreak of cholera killed 115 people and left 8,500 ill. In late 2017, another Battle of Sanaa broke out between the Houthis and forces loyal to former President Saleh, who was killed.

On 17 May 2022, the first commercial flight in six years took off from Sanaa International Airport as part of a UN-brokered 60-day truce agreement struck between the Houthis and the internationally recognised government the prior month.

UNESCO is currently carrying out a cash for work project to restore the historic city. Efforts are being led by engineer Harbia Al Himiary.

== Geography and climate ==
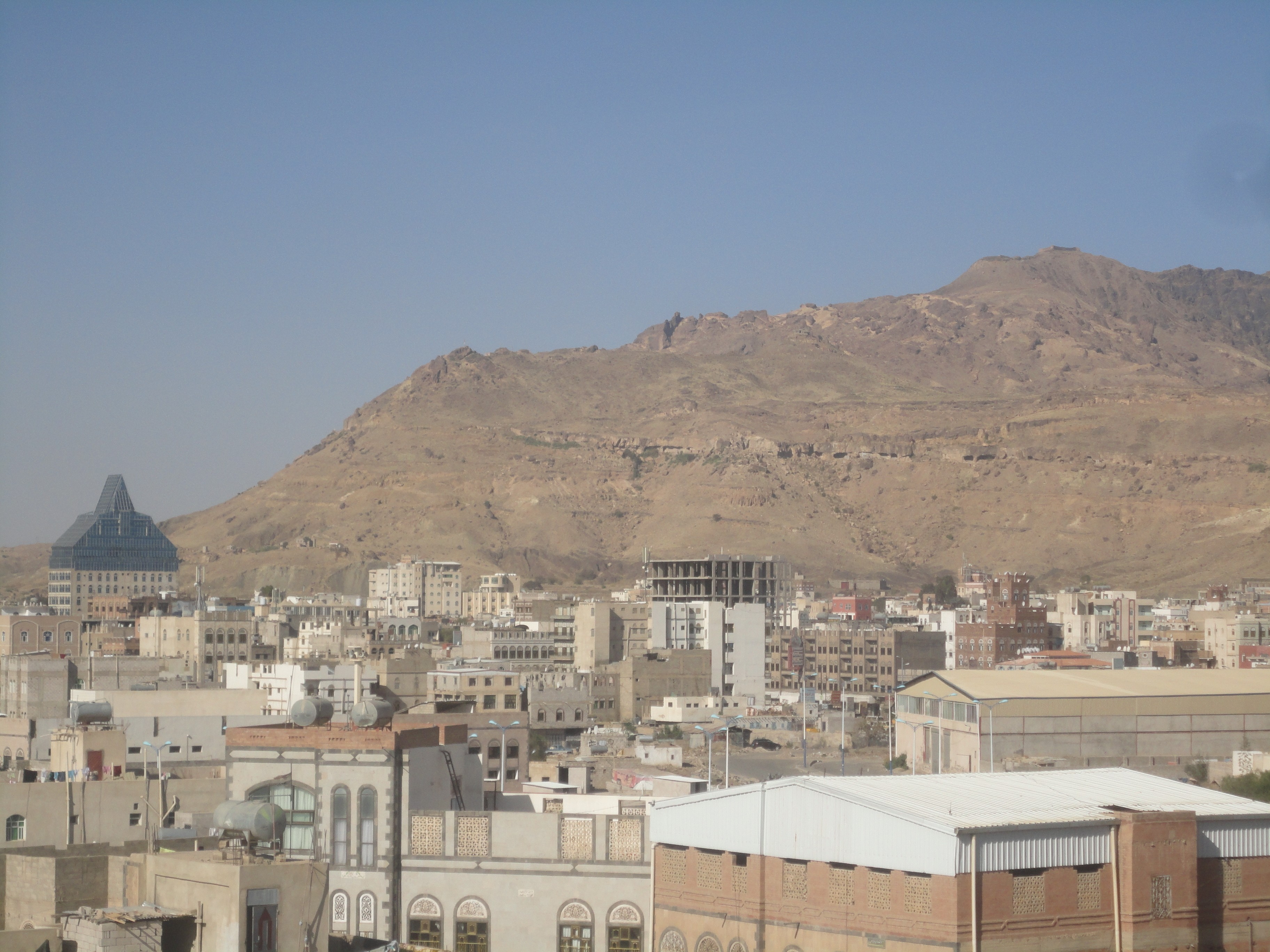
Jabal Nuqm or Jabal Nuqum (Arabic: جَبَل نُقُم) of the Yemeni Sarawat in the area of Sanaa. Local legend has it that after the death of Noah, his son Shem built the city at the base of this mountain.

=== Natural setting ===
Sanaa is located on a plain of the same name, the Haql Sanaa, which is over 2,200m above sea level. The plain is roughly 50–60 km long north–south and about 25 km wide, east–west, in the area north of Sanaa, and somewhat narrower further south. To the east and west, the Sanaa plain is bordered by cliffs and mountains, with wadis coming down from them. The northern part of the area slopes gently upward toward the district of Arhab, which was historically known as al-Khashab. Much of the Sanaa plain is drained by the Wadi al-Kharid, which flows northward, through the northeastern corner of the plain, towards al-Jawf, which is a broad wadi that drains the eastern part of the Yemeni highlands. The southern part of the plain straddles the watershed between the al-Kharid and the Wadi Siham, which flows southwest towards the Yemeni Tihama.

Sanaa itself is located at the narrowest part of the plain, nestled between Jabal Nuqum to the east and the foothills of Jabal An-Nabi Shu'ayb, Yemen's tallest mountain, to the west. The mountain's peak is 25 km (16 miles) west of Sanaa. Because of this position, with the city sandwiched between mountains to the east and west, most of Sanaa's expansion in recent decades has been along a north-south axis.

Jabal Nuqum rises about 500 metres (1,600 feet) above Sanaa. According to the 10th-century writer Al-Hamdani, the mountain was the site of an iron mine, although no trace of it exists today; he also mentions a particular type of onyx which came from Nuqum. Muhammad ibn Zakariya al-Razi described a dam located at Nuqum; its location is not known. This dam probably served to divert the waters coming down from the western face of the mountain and prevent them from flooding the city of Sanaa. Such a flood is known to have happened in 692 (73 AH), before the dam was built, and it is described as having destroyed some of Sanaa's houses. Despite its proximity to the city, Jabal Nuqum does not appear to have been fortified until 1607 (1016 AH), when a fort was built to serve as a lookout point to warn of potential attackers. The main mountain stronghold during the Middle Ages was Jabal Barash, further to the east.

Parts of the Sanaa plain have signs of relatively recent volcanic activity (geologically speaking), with volcanic cones and lava fields. One such area is located to the north, on the road to the Qa al-Bawn, and the next plain to the north, located around 'Amran and Raydah. The modern route between the two plains passes to the west of Jabal Din, a volcanic peak that marks the highest point between the two plains, although in medieval times the main route went to the east of the mountain.

=== Architecture ===
Sanaa's Old City is renowned for its tower houses, which are typically built from stone and fired brick and can reach up to 8 stories in height. The doors and windows feature are decorated with plaster openings. They traditionally housed a single extended patrilineal family, with new floors being built as sons married and had children of their own. (New buildings would also sometimes be built on adjacent land.) The ground floor was typically used as grain storage and for housing animals. Most families no longer keep either animals or grain, so many homeowners set up shops on the ground floor instead. (This often leads to conflict with building inspectors, since doing so is prohibited by law.) Meanwhile, the uppermost story, called the mafraj, is used as a second reception room and hosts afternoon qat chewing sessions.

Tower houses continue to be built in Sanaa, often using modern materials; often they are built from concrete blocks with decorative "veneers" of brick and stone. These "neo-traditional" tower houses are found in newer districts as well as the old city.

Most new residences built in Sanaa, though, use newer styles of architecture. The most common are "new villas", which are low-rise houses with fenced yards; they are especially common in the southern and western parts of the city. The other main archetype is smaller, "Egyptian-style" houses, which are usually built with reinforced concrete. These are most commonly found in the northern and eastern parts of Sanaa.

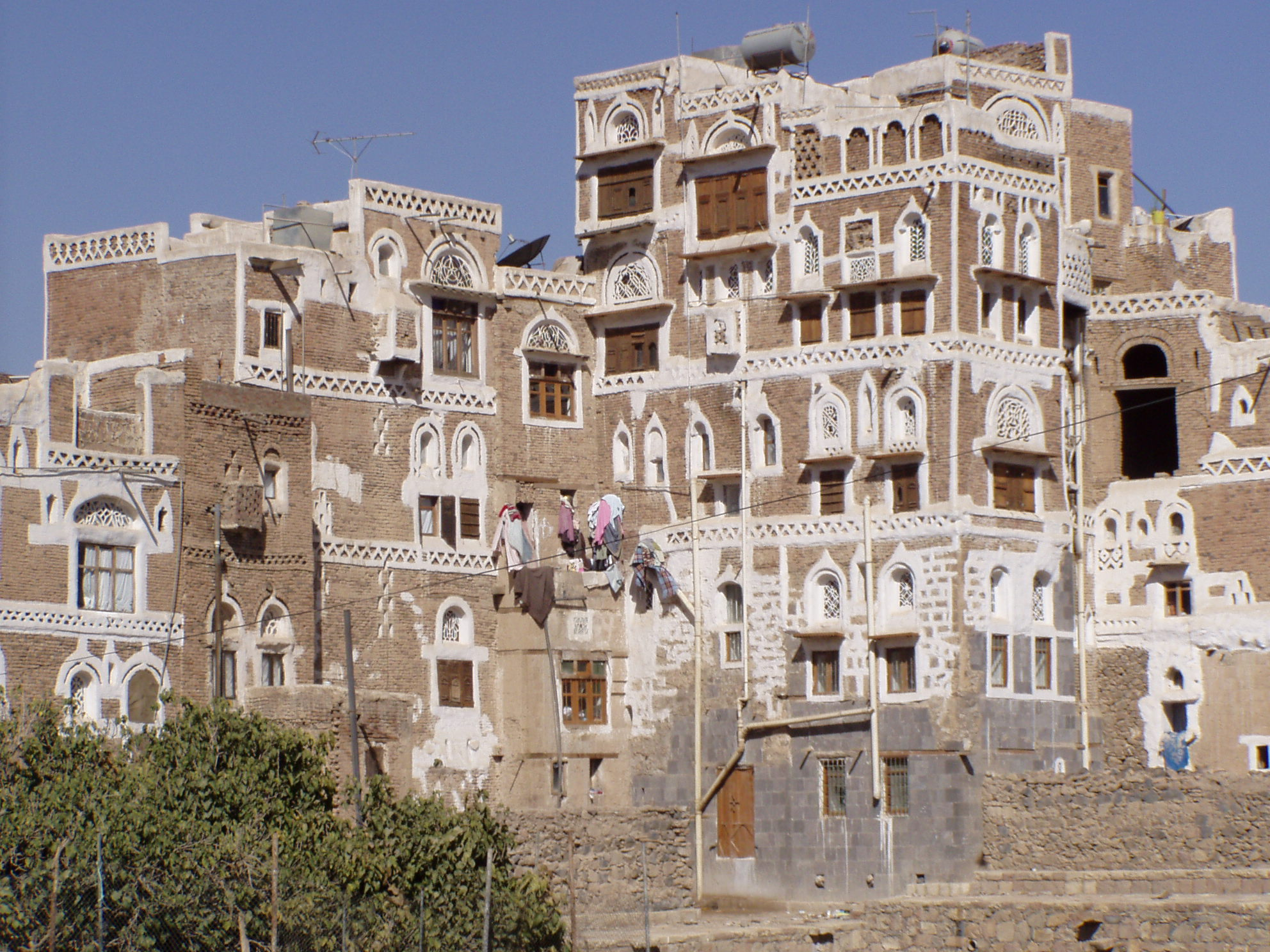
Several tower houses in Sanaa

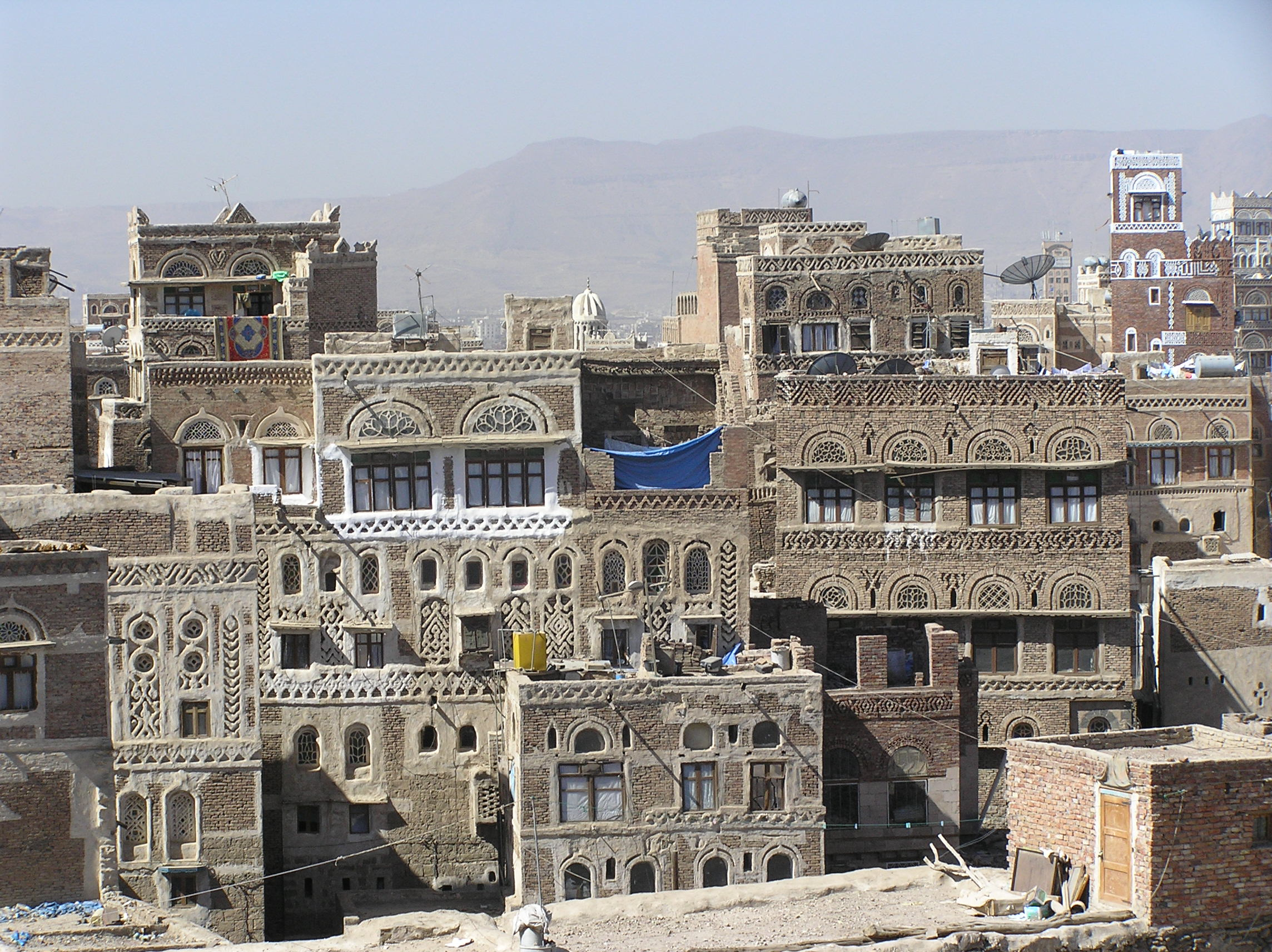
Tower houses

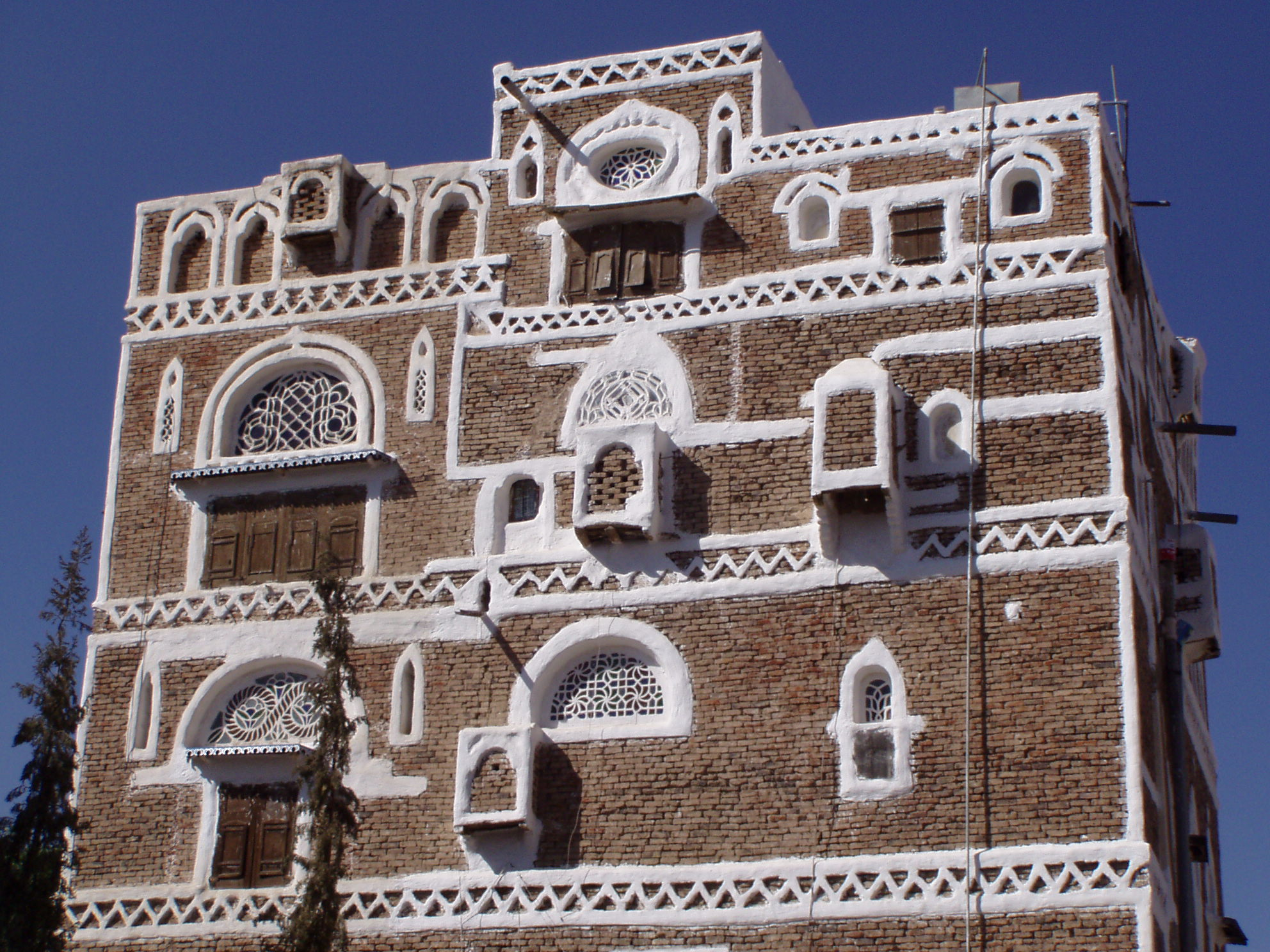
Closer view of a single tower house, showing the plaster decoration

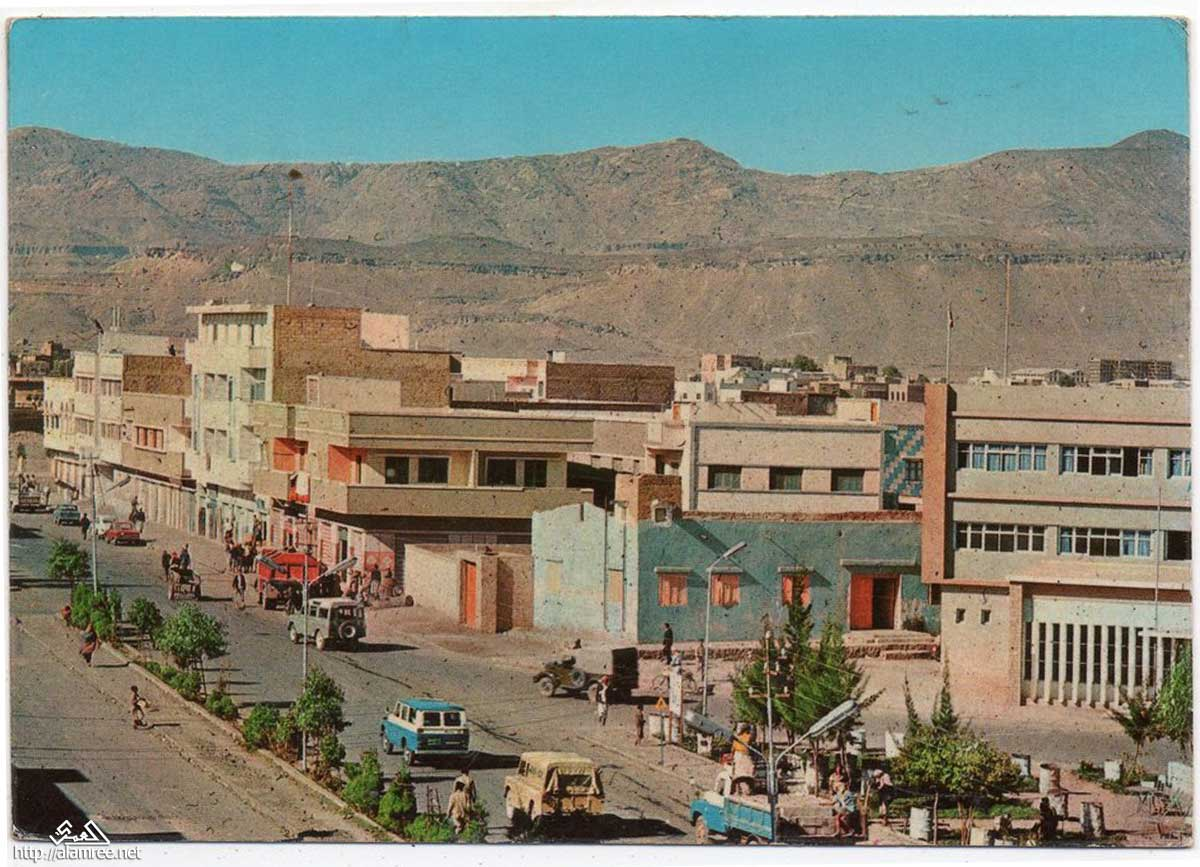
Street scene in the 1960s, showing newer concrete-based architecture

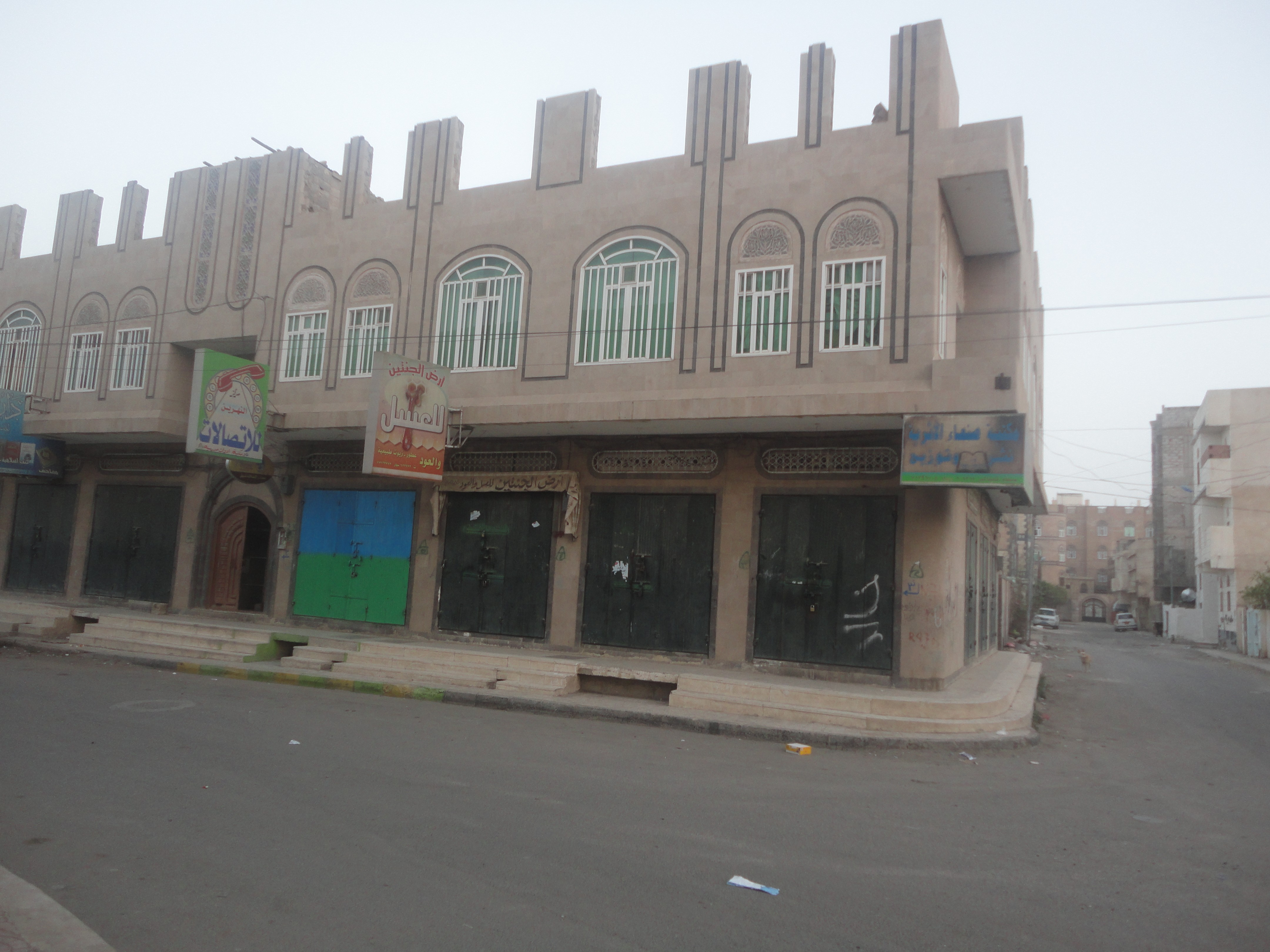
Sanaa Archaeological Library, showing a mix of styles: the windows evoke those of old tower houses, while the materials and structure are essentially modern.

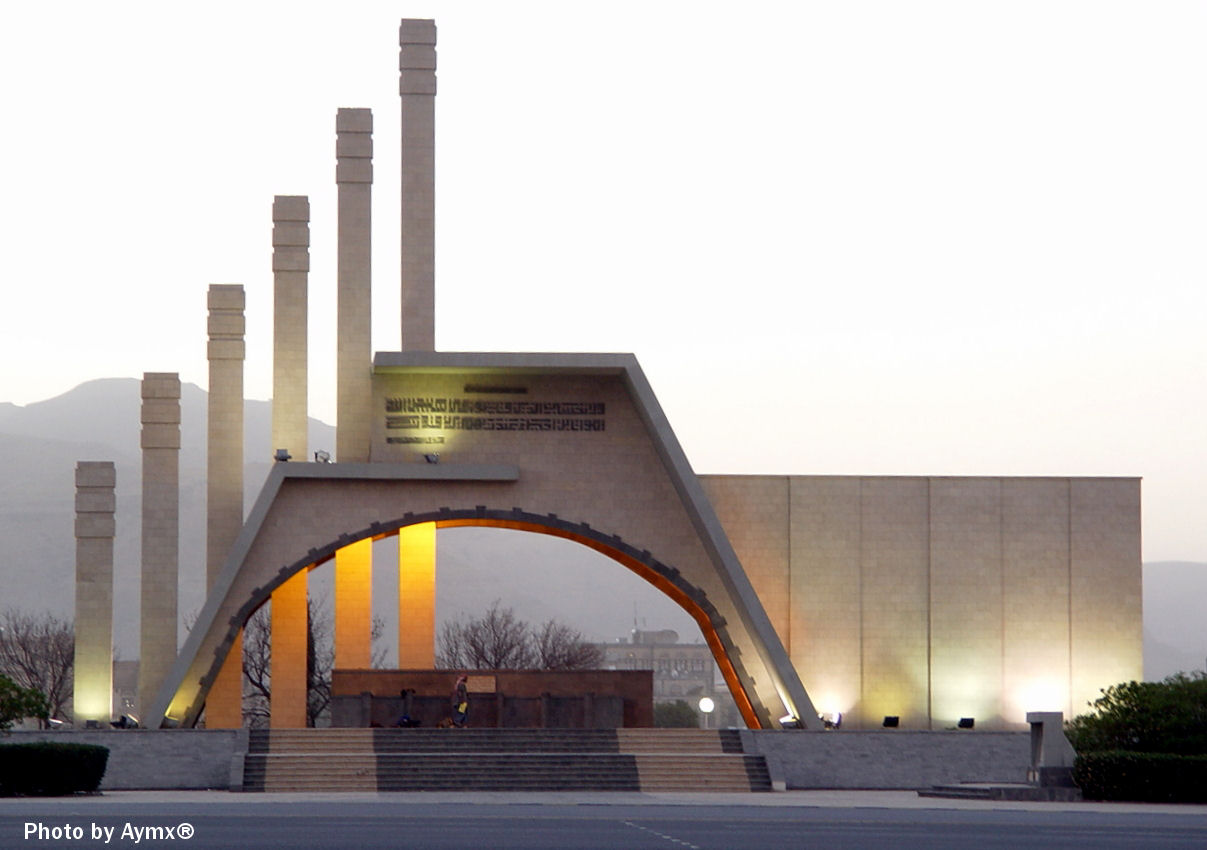
The Unknown Soldier Monument in Sanaa, as-Sab'in Square

=== Cityscape ===
Generally, Sanaa is divided into two parts: the Old City District ("al-Qadeemah") and the new city ("al-Jadid.") The former is much smaller and retains the city's ancient heritage and mercantile way-of-living while the latter is an urban sprawl with many suburbs and modern buildings. The newer parts of the city were largely developed in the 1960s and onward when Sanaa was chosen as the republican capital.

In recent decades, Sanaa has grown into a multipolar city, with various districts and suburbs serving as hubs of commercial, industrial, and social activity. Their development has generally been unplanned by central authorities. Many of them were initially set up by new arrivals from rural areas. Increasing land prices and commercial rents in the central city has also pushed many residents and commercial establishment outwards, towards these new hubs. Souks have been especially important in the development of these areas.

=== Neighbourhoods ===
==== Old City ====
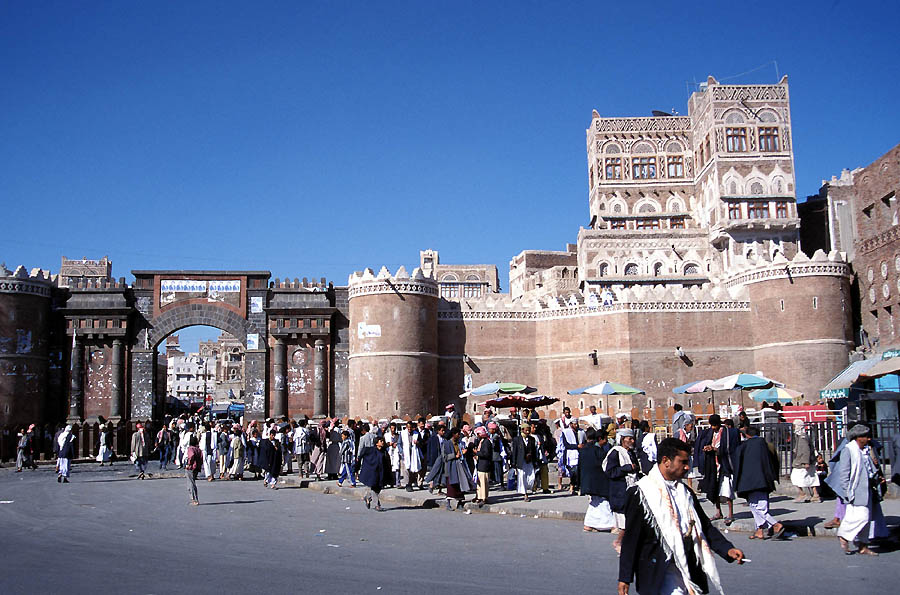
The 1,000-year-old Bab Al-Yemen (Gate of The Yemen) at the centre of the old town

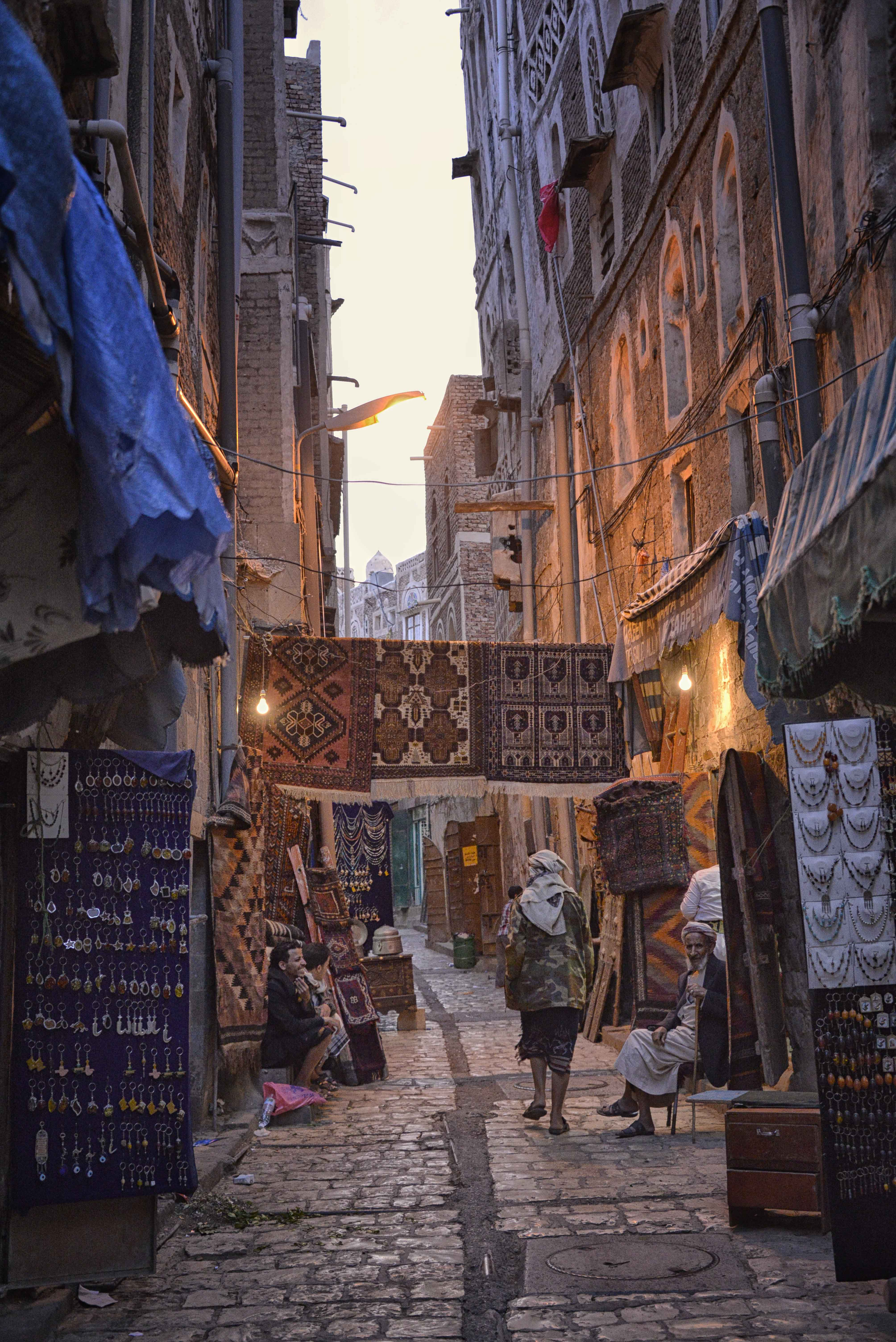
Evening in the Old City

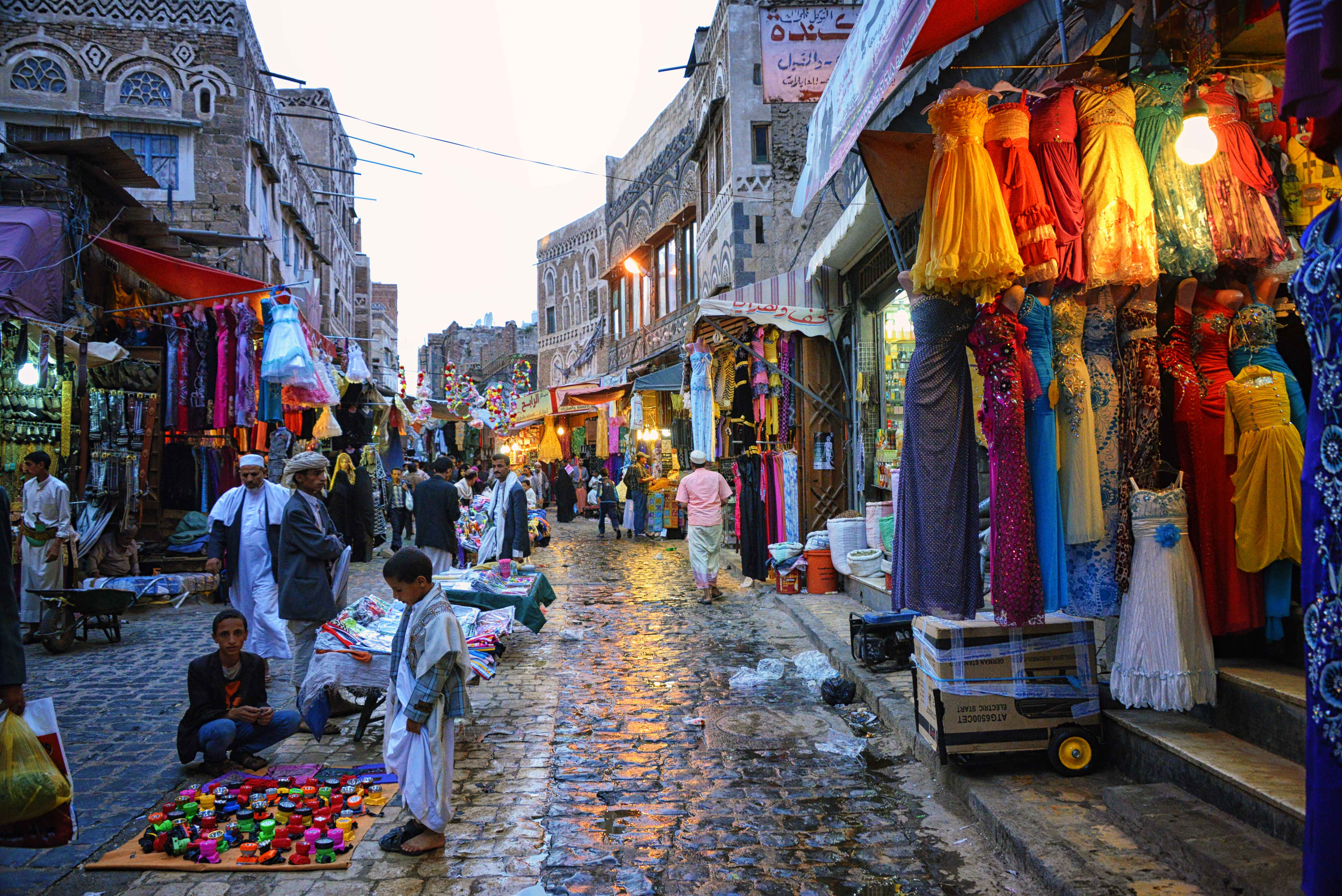
Market in the Old City

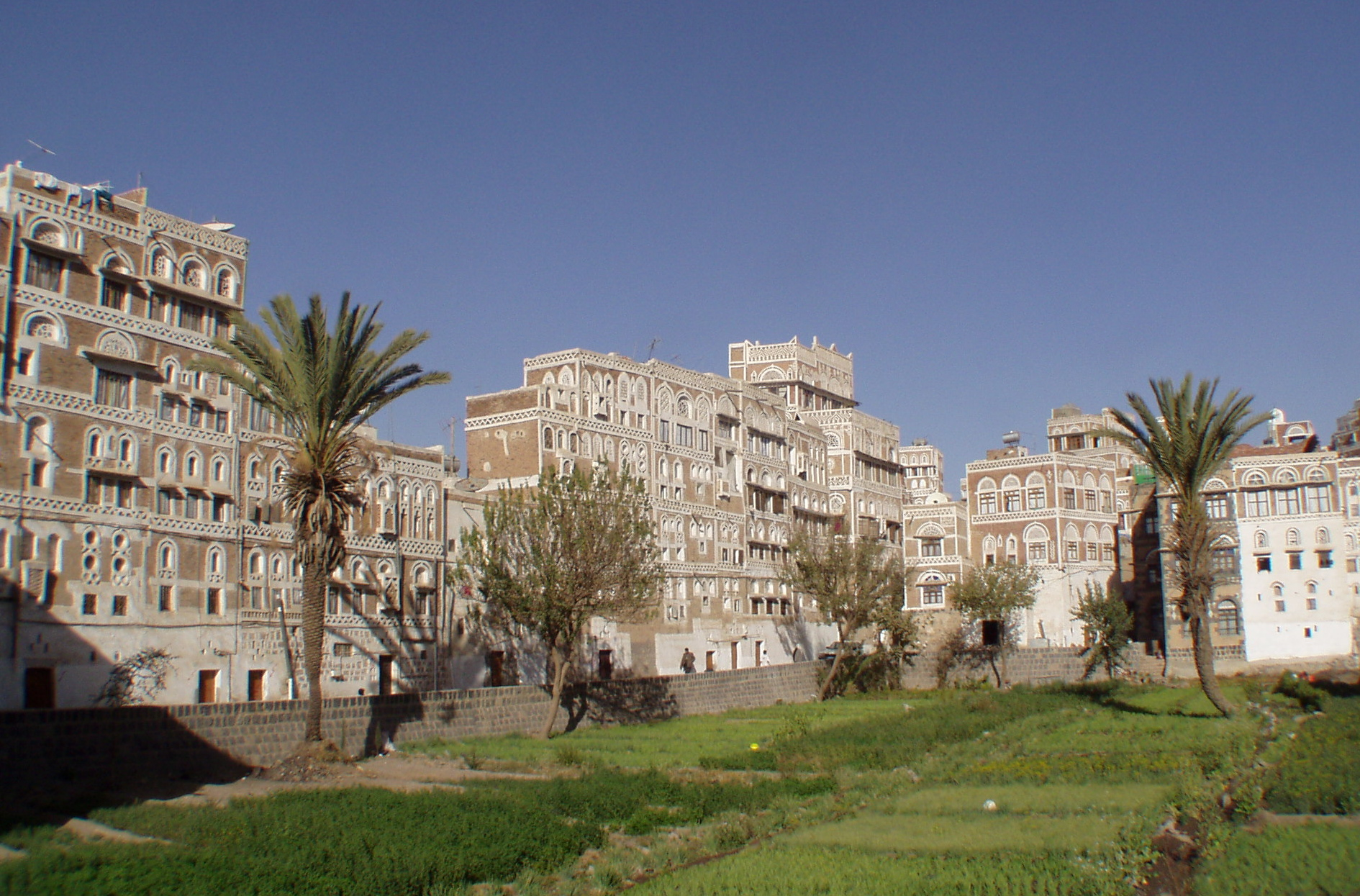
Vegetable garden in the old city

The Old City of Sanaa is recognised as a UNESCO World Heritage Site. The old fortified city has been inhabited for more than 2,500 years and contains many intact architectural sites. The oldest, partially standing architectural structure in the Old City of Sanaa is Ghumdan Palace. The city was declared a World Heritage Site by the United Nations in 1986. Efforts are underway to preserve some of the oldest buildings some of which, such as the Samsarh and the Great Mosque of Sanaa, is more than 1,400 years old. Surrounded by ancient clay walls that stand 9–14 metres (30–46 ft) high, the Old City contains more than 100 mosques, 12 hammams (baths), and 6,500 houses. Many of the houses resemble ancient skyscrapers, reaching several stories high and topped with flat roofs. They are decorated with elaborate friezes and intricately carved frames and stained-glass windows.

One of the most popular attractions is Suq al-Milh (Salt Market), where it is possible to buy salt along with bread, spices, raisins, cotton, copper, pottery, silverware, and antiques. The 7th-century Jāmiʿ al-Kabīr (the Great Mosque) is one of the oldest mosques in the world. The Bāb al-Yaman ("Gate of the Yemen") is an iconised entry point through the city walls and is more than 1,000 years old. Traditionally, the Old City was composed of several quarters (hara), generally centred on an endowed complex containing a mosque, a bathhouse, and an agricultural garden (maqshama). Human waste from households was disposed of via chutes. In the mountain air, it dried fairly quickly and was then used as fuel for the bathhouse. Meanwhile, the gardens were watered using gray water from the mosque's ablution pool.

===== Al-Tahrir =====
Al-Tahrir was designed as the new urban and economic hub of Sanaa during the 1960s. It is still the symbolic centre of the city, but economic activity here is relatively low. In the 21st century, development here pivoted more towards making it a civic and recreational centre.

===== Bi'r al-Azab =====
Bi'r al-ʻAzab (the Single's Well) in the 17th-century was a suburb of Sanaa, built between the city's walls and the new Jewish Quarter (settled by Jews in 1680 after returning from the Mawza Exile). It was originally known as the Turkish Quarter and renowned for its many gardens.

Later, it came to incorporate both the old Ottoman and Jewish quarter of Sanaa. Located to the west of the old city, Bi'r al-Azab was first mentioned in historical sources in 1627 (1036 AH), in the Ghayat al-amanni of Yahya ibn al-Husayn.

As part of central Sanaa, Bi'r al-Azab was one of the areas where new development was first concentrated during the 1970s. Today, it is mostly a residential and administrative district, with embassies, the office of the Prime Minister, and the chamber of deputies being located here.

==== Others ====
The area roughly between the two main circular roads around the city (Ring Road and Sittin) is extremely active, with a high population density and very busy souks. These areas are crossed by major commercial thoroughfares such as al-Zubayri and Abd al-Mughni Street, and are extensively served by public transport. Particularly significant districts in this area include al-Hasabah in the north, Shumayla in the south, and Hayil in the west. Al-Hasabah was formerly a separate village as described by medieval writers al-Hamdani and al-Razi, but by the 1980s it had become a suburb of Sanaa.

The southwestern area on both sides of Haddah Road is a generally affluent area with relatively more reliable access to utilities like water and sanitation. Many residents originally moved here from Aden after Yemeni reunification in 1990. Since the 1990s, there has been development of high-rise buildings in this area.

=== Administration ===
Governorates of Yemen

In 1983, as Sanaa experienced an explosion in population, the city was made into a governorate of its own, called Amanat al-Asimah ("the Capital's Secretariat"), by Presidential Decree No. 13. This governorate was then subdivided into nine districts in 2001, by Presidential Decree No. 2; a tenth district, Bani Al Harith District, was added within the same year. However, the exact legal status of the new Amanat al-Asimah Governorate, and the hierarchy of administrative authority, was never made clear.

Since then, the city of Sanaa has encompassed the following districts:

- Old City District
- Al Wahdah District
- As Sabain District
- Assafi'yah District
- At Tahrir District
- Ath'thaorah District
- Az'zal District
- Bani Al Harith District
- Ma'ain District
- Shu'aub District

=== Climate ===
Sanaa features a cold desert climate (Köppen: BWk). Sanaa sees on average 265 mm (10.43 in) of precipitation per year. Due to its high elevation, however, temperatures are much more moderate than many other cities on the Arabian Peninsula; average temperatures remain relatively constant throughout the year in Sanaa, with its coolest month being January and its warmest month July. Even considering this, as a result of its lower latitude and higher elevation, UV radiation from the sun is much stronger than in the hotter climates further north on the Arab peninsula.

The city seldom experiences extreme heat or cold. Some areas around the city, however, can see temperatures fall to around −9 °C (16 °F) or −7 °C (19 °F) during winter. Frost usually occurs in the early winter mornings, and there is a slight wind chill in the city at elevated areas that causes the cold mornings to be bitter, including low humidity. The sun warms the city to the high 20–22 °C (68–72 °F) during the noontime but it drops drastically after nightfall to a low around 3–4 °C (37–39 °F).

The city experiences many microclimates from district to district because of its location in the Sanaa basin and unequal elevations throughout the city. Summers are warm and it can cool swiftly at night, especially after rainfall. Sanaa receives almost all of its annual rainfall from April to August. Rainfall amounts vary from year to year; some years could see 500–600 mm (20–24 inches) of rainfall, while others barely get 150 mm (5.9 inches). High temperatures have increased slightly during the summer over the past few years, while low temperatures and winter temperatures have also risen over the same period.

Climate data for Sanaa, Yemen
Month	Jan	Feb	Mar	Apr	May	Jun	Jul	Aug	Sep	Oct	Nov	Dec	Year
Record high °C (°F)	30 (86)	31 (88)	32 (90)	32 (90)	37 (99)	39 (102)	41 (106)	38 (100)	40 (104)	34 (93)	33 (91)	31 (88)	41 (106)
Mean daily maximum °C (°F)	22.3 (72.1)	24.7 (76.5)	25.6 (78.1)	24.8 (76.6)	25.7 (78.3)	28.2 (82.8)	26.6 (79.9)	25.9 (78.6)	25.1 (77.2)	22.2 (72.0)	20.3 (68.5)	20.5 (68.9)	24.3 (75.8)
Daily mean °C (°F)	12.6 (54.7)	14.1 (57.4)	16.3 (61.3)	16.6 (61.9)	18.0 (64.4)	19.3 (66.7)	20.0 (68.0)	19.6 (67.3)	17.8 (64.0)	15.0 (59.0)	12.9 (55.2)	12.4 (54.3)	16.2 (61.2)
Mean daily minimum °C (°F)	3.0 (37.4)	3.6 (38.5)	7.0 (44.6)	8.5 (47.3)	10.4 (50.7)	10.5 (50.9)	13.4 (56.1)	13.3 (55.9)	10.6 (51.1)	7.9 (46.2)	5.5 (41.9)	4.4 (39.9)	8.2 (46.7)
Record low °C (°F)	−4 (25)	−1 (30)	1 (34)	4 (39)	1 (34)	9 (48)	5 (41)	0 (32)	3 (37)	1 (34)	−1 (30)	−2 (28)	−4 (25)
Average precipitation mm (inches)	5 (0.2)	5 (0.2)	17 (0.7)	48 (1.9)	29 (1.1)	6 (0.2)	50 (2.0)	77 (3.0)	13 (0.5)	2 (0.1)	8 (0.3)	5 (0.2)	265 (10.4)
Average relative humidity (%)	39.3	35.8	38.5	41.1	36.0	27.2	40.1	45.5	29.9	29.0	38.1	37.7	36.5
Mean daily sunshine hours	8	8	8	9	9	8	6	7	8	9	9	8	8
Source 1: Climate-Data.org (altitude: 2259m), Weather2Travel (sunshine)
Source 2: Climatebase.ru (humidity)

== Culture ==
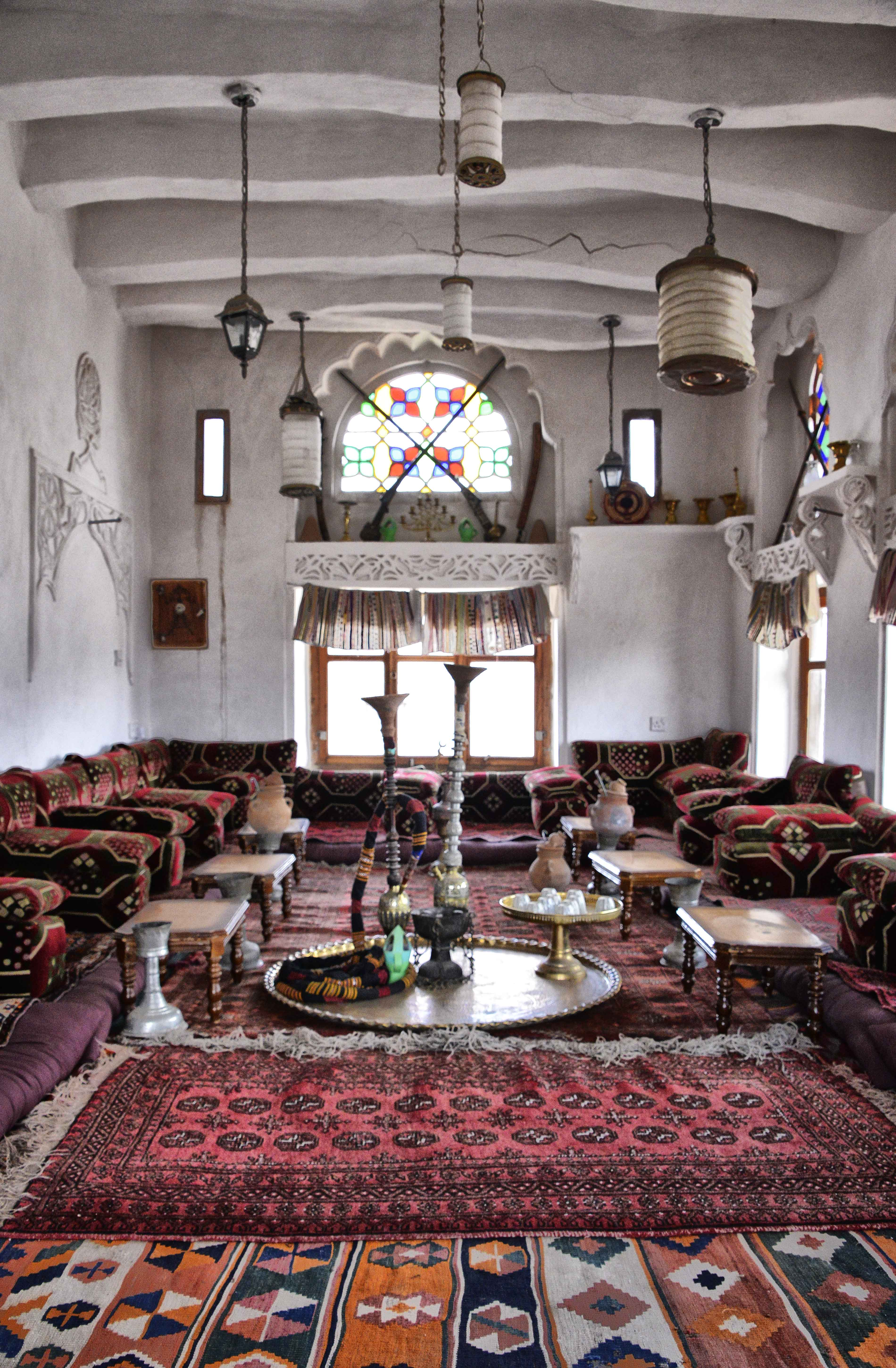
A majlis (sitting room) in Sanaa, 2013

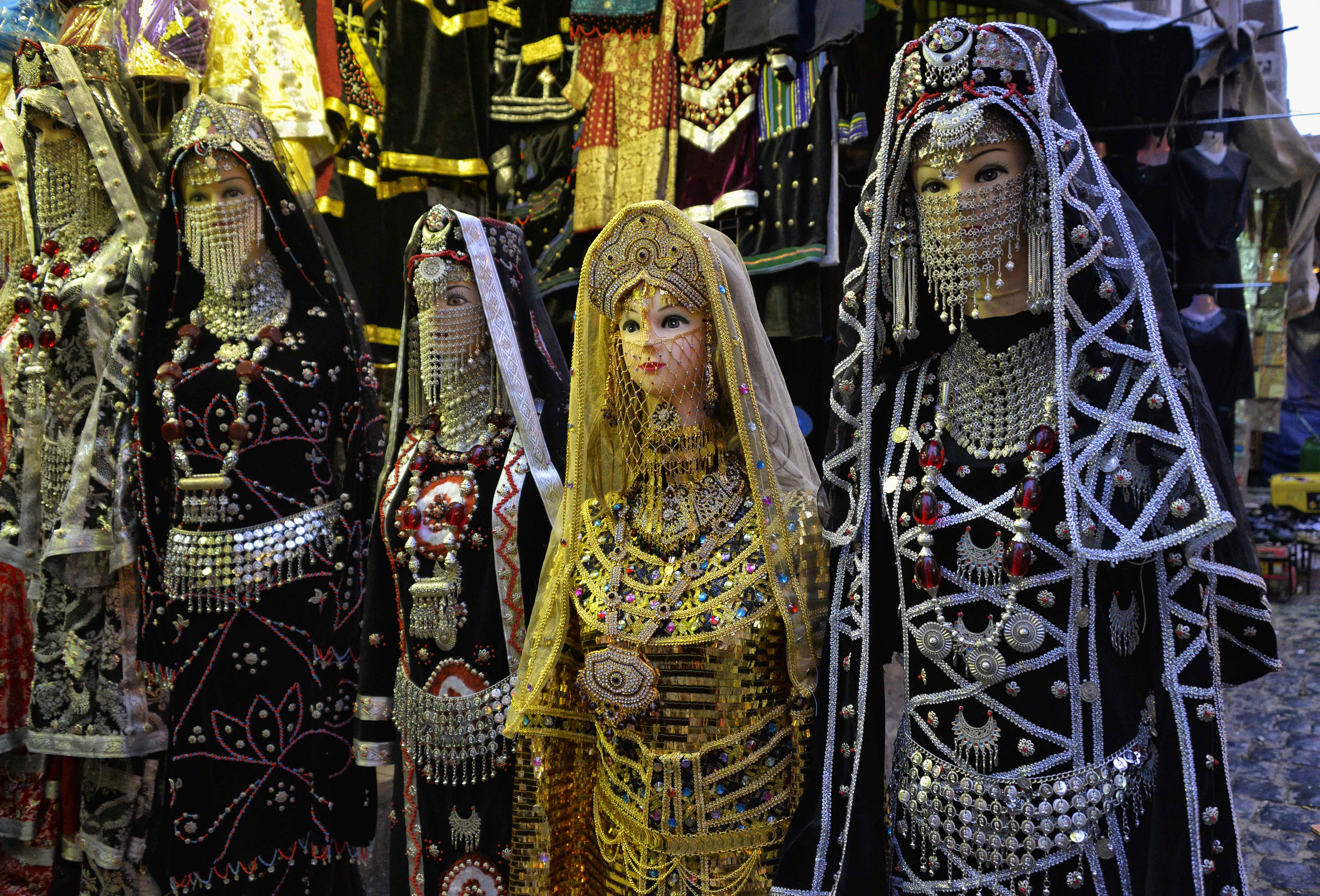
Store models showing traditional Sanʽani women's clothes

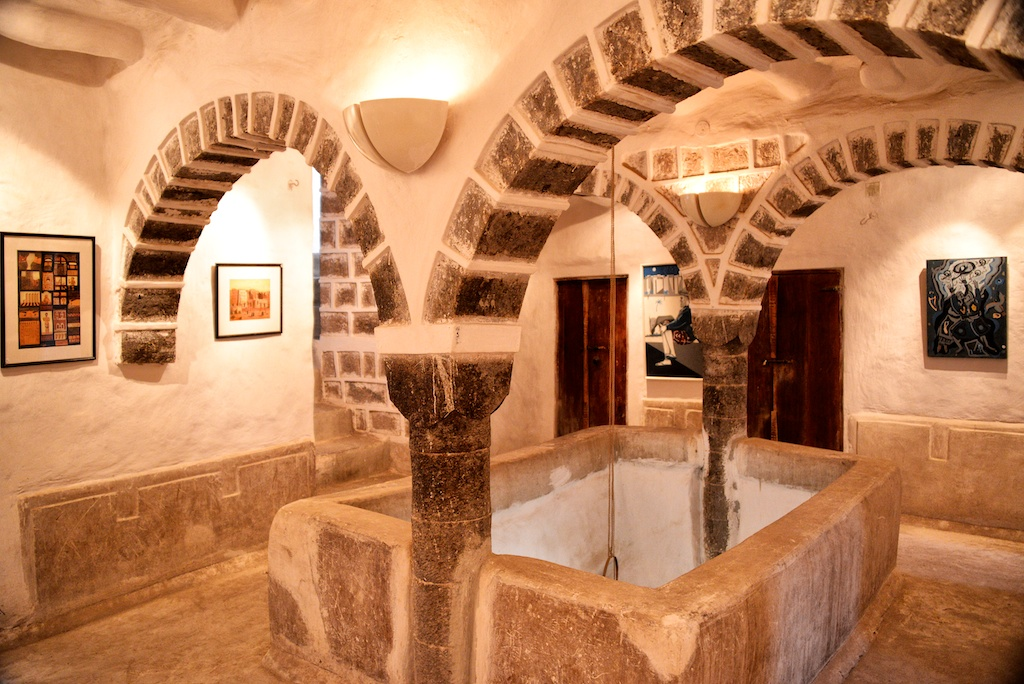
An art gallery in Sanaa

=== Music ===
Sanaa has a rich musical tradition and is particularly renowned for the musical style called al-Ghina al-San'ani (Arabic: الغناء الصنعاني al-ġināʾ aṣ-Ṣanʿānī), or "the song of Sanaa", which dates back to the 14th century and was designated as a UNESCO Intangible Cultural Heritage in 2003. This style of music is not exclusive to Sanaa, and is found in other areas of Yemen as well, but it is most closely associated with the city. It is one of about five regional genres or "colors" (lawn) of Yemeni music, along with Yafi'i, Laheji, Adeni, and Hadhrami. It is often part of social events, including the samra, or evening wedding party, and the magyal, or daily afternoon gathering of friends.

The basic format consists of a singer accompanied by two instrumentalists, one playing the qanbus (Yemeni lute) and the other playing the sahn nuhasi, which is a copper tray balanced on the musician's thumbs and played by being lightly struck by the other eight fingers. Lyrics are in both classical Arabic and Yemeni Arabic and are known for their wordplay and emotional content. Singers often use melismatic vocals, and the arrangements feature pauses between verses and instrumental sections. Skilled performers often "embellish" a song's melody to highlight its emotional tone.

In the earliest days of the recording industry in Yemen, from 1938 into the 1940s, Sanaani music was the dominant genre among Yemenis who could afford to buy records and phonographs (primarily in Aden). As prices fell, Sanaani-style records became increasingly popular among the middle class, but at the same time, it began to encounter competition from other genres, including Western and Indian music as well as music from other Arab countries. The earliest Sanaani recording stars generally came from wealthy religious families. The most popular was 'Ali Abu Bakr Ba Sharahil, who recorded for Odeon Records; other popular artists included Muhammad and Ibrahim al-Mas, Ahmad 'Awad al-Jarrash, and Muhammad 'Abd al-Rahman al-Makkawi.

=== Theatre ===
Yemen has a rich, lively tradition of theatre going back at least a century. In Sanaa, most performances take place at the Cultural Center (Markaz al-Thaqafi), which was originally designed as an auditorium instead of a theatre. It "possesses only the most basic of lighting and sound equipment, and the smallest of wings" and lacks space to store props or backdrops. Yet despite the scarce resources, "dramatic talent and creativity abound" and productions draw large, enthusiastic crowds who react on the action onstage with vigour: "uproarious laughter at clever lines, and deafening cheers for the victorious hero, but also occasional shouts of disagreement, cries of shock when an actor or actress breaks a taboo or expresses a controversial opinion." Katherine Hennessey draws attention to the fact that Yemeni women act alongside men onstage, write and direct plays (Nargis Abbad being one of the most popular), and make up a significant part of audiences, often bringing their children with them. She contrasts all these factors to the other countries on the Arabian peninsula: places like Qatar or Saudi Arabia have extensive resources and fancier facilities, but not much of a theatrical tradition, and casts and audiences are often segregated by gender.

Since Yemeni reunification in the early 1990s, the government has sponsored annual national theatre festivals, typically scheduled to coincide with World Theatre Day on March 27. In the 21st century, the actors and directors have increasingly come from Sanaa. In 2012, in addition to the festival, there was a national theatre competition, sponsored by Equal Access Yemen and Future Partners for Development, featuring theatre troupes from around the country. It had two rounds; the first was held in six different governorates, and the second was held in Sanaa.

Sanaa's theatre scene was disrupted by war and famine in the 2010s; additionally, since the Houthis gained control of the city in 2014, they "have imposed strict rules on dress, gender segregation, and entertainment in the capital." In December 2020, however, a performance was held in Sanaa by one troupe, to offer respite and entertainment to people in a city suffering from the civil war and the ongoing coronavirus pandemic. Directed by Mohammad Khaled, the performance drew a crowd of "dozens of men, women and children."

=== Sports ===
Football is the most popular sport in Sanaa. The city is home to the Ali Muhesen Stadium, home of the Yemen national football team, and is mostly used for football matches. The stadium holds 25,000 people.

=== Zoo ===
Like Taiz Zoo, this zoo held fauna caught in the wild, such as the Arabian leopard, as well as imported animals such as African lions and gazelles. The lions were thought to be of Ethiopian origin, but a phylogeographic test demonstrated them to be different from captive Ethiopian lions kept at Addis Ababa Zoo, and more similar to lions from Eastern and Southern Africa.

=== Qat ===
There is a daily practice of Qat chewing which exists within the city of Sanaa. Qat is a type of plant with stimulant-like qualities. This daily practice occurs in a mafraj, which is a room designated for Qat chewing. Qat comes in three different varieties, Ahmar, Abiad, and Azraq, (translated to red, white, and blue) with Ahmar being considered of the highest quality, and Abiad being considered the weakest. According to a foreign resident, the Qat from the North of Sanaa is the most prized of the Qat grown locally. This daily chewing tradition starts in the Qat market, with the leaves used for a particular day being bought day of use.

== Demographics ==
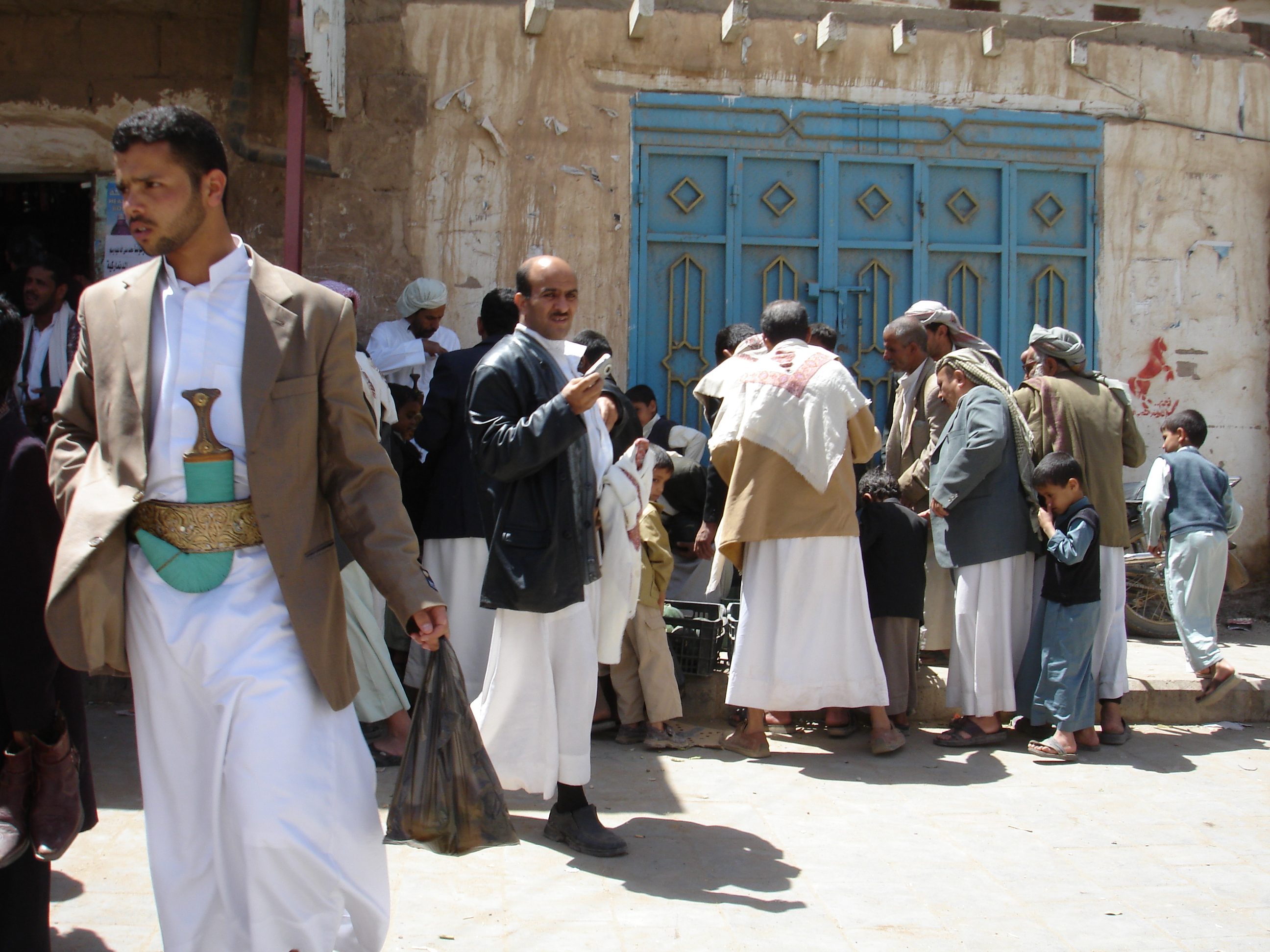
People of Sanaa

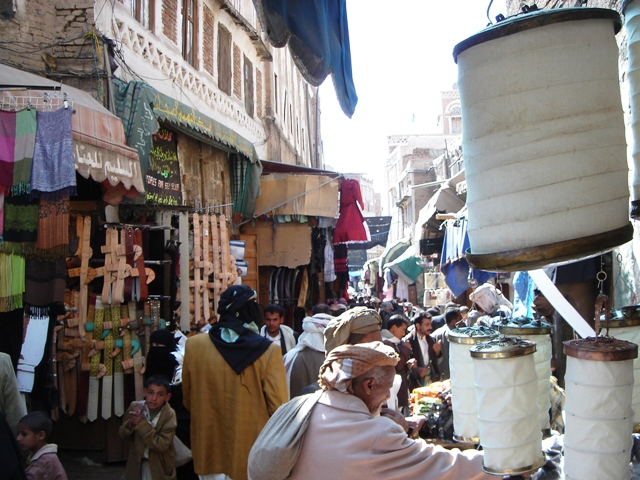
A market scene in Sanaa

Historical population
Year	Pop.	±% p.a.
1911	18,000	—
1921	25,000	+3.34%
1931	25,000	+0.00%
1940	80,000	+13.80%
1963	100,000	+0.97%
1965	110,000	+4.88%
1975	134,600	+2.04%
1981	280,000	+12.98%
1986	427,505	+8.83%
1994	954,448	+10.56%
2001	1,590,624	+7.57%
2004	1,748,000	+3.19%
2005	1,937,451	+10.84%
2023	3,769,615	+3.77%

The city's population growth soared from the 1960s onward as a result of mass rural migration to the city in search of employment and improved standard of living. Sanaa is the fastest-growing capital city in the world with a growth rate of 7%, while the growth rate of the nation as a whole is 3.2%. About 10% of the population resides in the Old City, while the remainder lives in the outside districts. The three large administrative districts in increasing population size are Shu'ub (شعوب), Ma'in (معيت), and As-sab'in (السبعين), with populations of about 500,000, 630,000, and 730,000 respectively.

The population in Sanaa is very young, with almost 60% of people in the Amanat al-Asimah Governorate being under 18 years old. The population also skews slightly male, with a male-to-female ratio of 1.10.

A majority of Sanaa's inhabitants practice Zaydi Islam, while Sunnis and Isma'ilis are minority groups. Sunnis tend to be most concentrated in the newer parts of the city, reflecting an influx of new residents from the countryside since the late 20th century.

=== Social class ===
Before the revolution of 1962, Sanaani society was divided into a fairly well-defined hierarchy of social classes. There were five major groups: ranked from highest to lowest, they were the sayyids, the qadis, the mansibs (plural: manasib), the Bani Khumis (also called the muzayyin), and the akhdam. Since then, the system of social class has changed significantly in the context of market capitalism.

At the top of the traditional social order were the sayyids, who claimed descent from Muhammad and were therefore seen as the legitimate ruling class. Right below them were the qadis, who similarly claimed descent from "an original class of judges". Because of their elite status, the sayyids were the main targets of the 1962 revolution, but they and the qadis continue to wield a strong cultural influence today.

Below these elite groups were the manasib, whose name literally means "dignity", "rank", or "position". These included artisans employed in "honourable" trades, such as metalsmiths (for gold, silver, copper, and iron), carpenters, dyers, builders and masons, plumbers, turners (i.e. lathe operators), porters, painters of inscriptions, and makers of weapons, hookahs, or mattresses. Although these trades were seen as somewhat demeaning for members of the upper classes to take part in, they were still fairly respectable and in some cases sayyids or qadis would engage in them as a main source of income. The manasib were generally considered to have tribal ancestry and martial connotations, and they were the ones who were mustered to defend the city when it was attacked.

The Bani Khumis, literally the "sons of the fifth", were the ones who took part in trades that the three higher-ranked classes refused to work in. These included cobblers, tanners, makers of leather sheaths, saddlers, brickmakers, butchers, barbers, bath attendants, coffee house proprietors, brass founders, and vegetable gardeners. Below the Bani Khumis were the akhdam, the lowest social class, who were mostly street sweepers.

This traditional class hierarchy began to change rapidly in the decades after the 1962 revolution. Particularly during the 1970s, there was a shift towards a new social hierarchy that was based not on birthright but on wealth. For example, working in commerce (such as qat merchants or café proprietors) was traditionally looked down upon by upper classes like sayyids and qabilis (i.e. tribesmen), but as it became increasingly lucrative during the 1970s, it was increasingly seen as respectable and now some members of the traditional upper classes are willing to engage in these trades. (This does not extend to all profitable trades, though — butchering, for example, still has a stigma despite bringing in a fair amount of money.)

This shift has been far more pronounced in Sanaa, a big city where resources are more concentrated than in rural areas (where old social divisions are much more strongly maintained today). Some of the contributing factors to the shift included the new education system, modelled on Egypt's; widespread migration of Yemeni men to other, oil-rich Arab states; and greater integration of Yemen into the global economy.

=== Jewish community ===
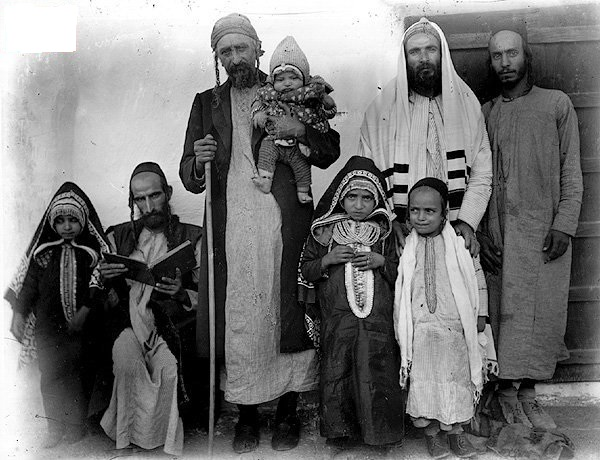
Yemeni Jewish family from Sanaa, c. 1940

Jews have been present in Yemen since the 5th century BCE and form part of the historic Jewish diasporas. In Sanaa, Jews had initially settled within the enclosed citadel, known as al-Qaṣr, near the ruins of the old tower known as Ghumdan Palace, but were evicted from there in the late 6th century by the ruling monarch, and moved to a different section of the city, known as al-Marbaki (also called the Falayhi Quarter). From there, they again uprooted and were made to settle in the section of the city known as al-Quzali, and eventually moved and settled in the neighbourhood of al-Sa'ilah. In 1679, during the Mawza Exile, they were once again evicted from their place of residence. Upon returning to the city in 1680, they were given a plot of land outside of the city walls, where they built the new Jewish Quarter, al-Qāʻ (now Qāʻ al-ʻUlufi), and where they remained until the community's demise in the mid-20th century. In 1839 the Reverend Joseph Wolff, who later went to Bukhara to attempt to save Lieutenant Colonel Charles Stoddart and Captain Arthur Conolly, found in Yemen, near Sanaa, a tribe claiming to be descendants of Jehonadab. After the creation of the State of Israel in 1948, about 49,000 (of an estimated 51,000) of Yemenite Jews were airlifted to Israel, almost 10,000 of whom were from Sanaa (see the English-language book Jews and Muslims in lower Yemen: a study in protection and restraint, 1918–1949). There was then essentially no Jewish population in Sanaa until the Houthi insurgency broke out in northern Yemen in 2004. The Houthis directly threatened the Jewish community in 2007, prompting the government of President Saleh to offer them refuge in Sanaa. As of 2010, around 700 Jews were living in the capital under government protection. In April 2017, it was reported that 40 of the last 50 Jews were in an enclave next to the American Embassy in Sanaa, and they were subject to threats of ethnic cleansing by the Houthis. On 28 April 2020 Yemenite Minister Moammer al-Iryani remarked the fate of the last 50 Jews in Yemen is unknown. On 16 July 2020 5 Jews were allowed to leave Yemen by the Houthi leaving 33 Jews in the country. In July 2020 the Mona Relief reported on their Website that as of July 19, 2020 of the Jewish population in Yemen, there were only a "handful" of Jews in Sanaa.

== Economy ==
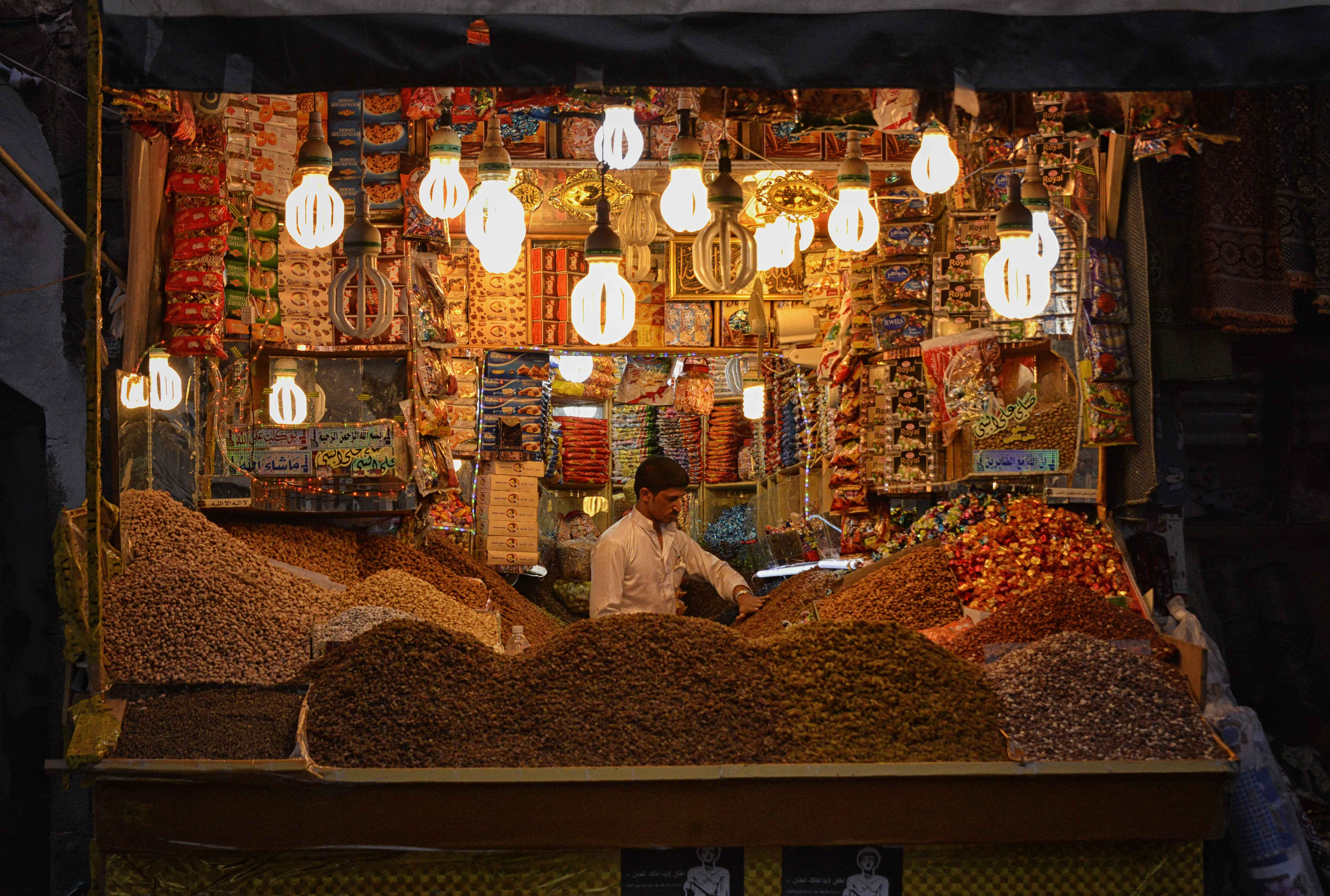
Market stall in Sanaa

Historically, Sanaa had a mining industry. The hills around Sanaa were mined for onyx, chalcedony, and cornelian. The city also traded in agricultural products and due to being on the route from Aden towards the greater Arab world, was also a main market for imported western goods. The city was also known for its metalwork, which the British described as "famous" in the early 20th century, but declining in popularity. As of 1920, Sanaa was described by the British as being "well supplied with fruit and grapes, and has good water."

As the capital city of Yemen, nearly 40% of jobs in Sanaa are in the public sector. The city is also an important centre for commerce and industry in Yemen. Additionally, like many other cities in the developing world, Sanaa has a large informal sector that is estimated to constitute 32% of nongovernmental employment as of 2002.

By far the largest area of the economy, both in terms of the number of businesses and jobs, is in commerce and small services. As of 2004, 58.9% of all establishments and 31.3% of all jobs in Sanaa belong to this category. Another major category is general administration, which only makes up 0.8% of employers but has 18.0% of workers, making it the second largest in that regard. Manufacturing is the third-largest category by both measures, with about 12% for both. Sanaa also has a higher concentration of hotels and restaurants than elsewhere in the country.

About 62% of jobs in Sanaa are working for private, locally owned enterprises, followed by state-owned enterprises which employ 31%. Waqfs, private foreign-owned companies, and private joint ventures make up the rest in that order, with none employing more than 2%.

Sanaa's economy is large compared to its population: as of 2004, it was home to only 9% of Yemen's population but 16% of the country's businesses and 22% of its formal-sector jobs. The average size of a business establishment in Sanaa is small, at 3.88 employees on average; however, this is higher than the national average of 2.87 and only Aden has a higher average of 6.88 employees. Between 1992 and 2006, 39% of all new formal-sector jobs in Yemen were created in Sanaa, along with 33% of new business establishments. In terms of jobs created, Sanaa is ahead of all other governorates in Yemen by a factor of three.

=== Poverty and income inequality ===
While Sanaa has a vibrant, diverse economy with more jobs being created than anywhere else in Yemen, it also has the highest concentration of poverty in the country. It is home to 6.5% of the country's total poor population and 23% of the poor urban population. About 15% of the city's population lives below the national poverty line as of 2007. There are also many people living just above the poverty line who are still in a relatively precarious financial position. High unemployment is another problem; by some estimates, as much as 25% of Sanaa's potential workforce is unemployed.

Income inequality is also increasing: from 1998 to 2005, the Gini coefficient for Sanaa increased from 37% to 44%: a 21% increase, the highest in the country. High inflation, low per capita income growth, and disproportionate gains by the rich have contributed to a middle class squeeze in Sanaa's middle class since the 1980s.

=== Challenges facing local businesses ===
A 2005 survey of 488 Yemeni firms by the Mitsubishi Research Institute included a subset of 175 firms in Sanaa. They reported similar challenges in doing business with firms throughout the country. In particular, corruption is a problem in their dealings with the government, and hefty bribes are often a necessity. Certain businesses can use their connections to dodge taxes and regulations, which puts other businesses at a disadvantage because they have to abide by the rules. Long delays for customs clearances, especially for imports, are ubiquitous, and over 70% of the surveyed firms reported that they had made extra-legal payments to customs officials. Financial constraints also confront many entrepreneurs in Sanaa: the cost of bank credit is also prohibitively high, and loan guarantees often comes with heavy demands that are difficult to meet. Shortcomings in municipal infrastructure are another problem: for example, because access to electricity is unreliable, many firms have to install their own backup generators.

=== Energy ===
Before the civil war, Yemen's electricity was primarily supplied by the Ma'rib gas-fired power plant, which came online in 2009 and supplied 27-40% of the country's electricity while active. (Before that, the power came from six diesel power plants in Sanaa itself.) The Ma'rib plant is connected to the Bani Hushaysh substation by a power line with a capacity of 400 kV, and the Bani Hushaysh substation is then connected to substations in Dhahban and Hizyaz by two 132-kV lines. However, the Ma'rib-Sanaa power line was frequently targeted by attacks; there were 54 attacks on the power line between 2010 and 2013. The Ma'rib plant ceased operations in 2015.

The Dhahban and Hizyaz substations also have generating capacity in addition to being supplied by the Ma'rib plant. The Dhahban station is the main one in Sanaa; located 10 km northwest of the city, it had an original generating capacity of 20 MW, with another 30 MW installed during the 2000s, bringing the total to 50 MW. The Hizyaz station consists of three power plants: the first, with a capacity of 30 MW, was completed in 2002. Another 60 MW plant was added in 2004, and then in 2007 the third plant, with a capacity of 30 MW, was also completed.

While most of prewar Sanaa was connected to the electrical grid, including at least partial coverage in most of the city's 35 informal settlements, access to electricity was unreliable. Power outages were common, and one 2011 report suggested that electricity was only available for one hour per day.

The civil war has severely impacted the energy sector in Yemen, due to several factors including damage from attacks, lack of funding for maintenance, and fuel shortages. As of 2018, 43% of Sanaa's energy assets were destroyed, while another 38% had suffered partial damage; in addition, 81% of the facilities were not functioning. As a result, the public power supply in Sanaa has become almost nonexistent: of the daily 500 MW electricity demand in the city, the city receives 40 MW. The public electricity supply is now mostly or entirely supplied by the Hizyaz station, whose capacity has been reduced to 7 MW. Public grid access covers around 2% of the population, mostly in nearby neighbourhoods, and it is expensive for consumers. Private services using their generators also sell electricity to customers; they cover another 2.8% and cost about as much as the public supply. The largest share of electrical supply in Sanaa came from privately owned solar panels and diesel generators, which together covered 30% of the population. Solar power rapidly gained popularity in Yemen in 2015, and in 2016, it became the leading source of electricity in the country.

Prices of fuel and diesel in Yemen have risen dramatically since the start of the war; current prices are 150% of what they were in 2017. The most recent crisis in Sanaa came in September 2019, leading to days-long lines at gas stations. Black market prices can be three times higher than the official ones, leaving many unable to afford fuel.

== Education ==
Distribution of education levels among Sanaa residents in 2004.
1. Illiterate (21.9%)
2. Read and write (32.0%)
3. Primary (6.00%)
4. Secondary and equivalent (15.8%)
5. Higher education (7.40%)
6. Vocational — basic (14.2%)
7. Other or unspecified (2.70%)

Sanaa is relatively well-educated among Yemeni cities, and much more than the country as a whole. Private education is highly desired by more affluent residents, but access to it is nowhere near as good as in other capital cities in the region.

Each of Sanaa's districts has its educational district, with several government schools in each one.

The war in Yemen has severely affected education in Sanaa. After the internationally recognised government relocated the national bank from Sanaa to Aden in 2016, it stopped paying salaries to public-sector employees in Houthi-controlled areas. Many teachers quit teaching because of this, and they were replaced by inexperienced volunteers.

Sanaa University was established in 1970 to prepare Yemenis to work as teachers. As of 1984 it remained the only higher education institute in Yemen. In that time its enrolment had grown from 68 students in 1970–71 to around 9,700 in 1983–84. During its early years, Sanaa University was largely financed by Kuwait, and most professors, administrators, and teaching materials came from Kuwait as well. As of the 1980s, most professors came from Ain Shams University in Cairo. At that time, 10% of students at the university were female. The university's academic year consists of two 18-week semesters as well as an 8-week summer session. As of 1984, instruction was in Arabic in all faculties except for the Faculty of Science, where it was done in English. The then-planned Faculties of Engineering and Medical Sciences were also planned to have instruction done in English. As of 1984, one in five freshmen at Sanaa University went on to graduate in four years (the statistic for students who graduated after more than four years was not given).

== Health ==
As of October 2016, there are 88 health facilities in the Sanaa metro area. These include 5 primary-level health units (covering 1,000–5,000 people each), 56 health centres (covering over 50,000 people each — higher than the national average of 36,340, as well as the recommended standard of 5,000–20,000 per health centre), and 19 hospitals (covering on average some 390,000 people, over twice the recommended amount of 150,000 each). The hospitals have on average 6.9 beds per 10,000 people, which is slightly above the national average of 6.2 but well below the recommended minimum of 10. As of 2016 there are also 25 ambulances in the city. As of 2019, 77 healthcare facilities in Sanaa are supported by Health Cluster partners, including provision of outpatient consultations, medical interventions, fuel and water support, and staff training.

Sanaa's healthcare providers also serve people from surrounding governorates. It is one of two Yemeni cities offering tertiary healthcare services. The largest of the country's 6 blood transfusion centres is located at Sanaa's As-Sabeen Maternal Hospital. Additionally, most of Yemen's 40 providers of psychiatric care are located in Sanaa as of 2016.

The ongoing conflict has severely affected the health sector in Sanaa. In 2018, the total cost of damage to the health sector in Sanaa was estimated to be between 191 million and US$233 million. As of 2016, there was a ratio of 20 healthcare workers for every 10,000 people; this ratio had decreased to 14 by 2018, well below the World Health Organization's recommended minimum of 22 health staff per 10,000 people. There are severe shortages of medicines in Sanaa, with 57 types of cancer medicines and 8 kidney dialysis medicines being commercially unavailable. Those medicines that are available are subjected to large price increases. On 27 April 2018, As-Sabeen Maternal Hospital was hit by an airstrike and made inoperational. As of 2020, no information is available about its status.

Additionally, the closure of Sanaa International Airport to commercial flights in August 2016 prevented Yemenis from travelling abroad to receive specialised medical treatment unavailable in the country. Before it shut down, an estimated 7,000 Yemenis travelled through the airport to do so, including treatment for heart, kidney, and liver conditions, blood conditions, and cancer.

Sanaa was hit hard by the cholera outbreak in Yemen that lasted from 2016 to 2022, with Bani al-Harith District reporting the highest number of cases in January–August 2019. The Amanat al-Asimah governorate also had the second-highest number of measles cases in Yemen in 2019, behind only Saada Governorate.

=== Coronavirus ===
In May 2020, during the coronavirus pandemic, the local Houthi authorities responded by closing down several markets and locking down streets in 10 districts after suspected cases rose. At the same time, however, they have been suppressing all information about the scale of the outbreak, refusing to release positive test results and intimidating medical staff, journalists, and families to prevent them from speaking out about cases. Speaking about the coronavirus testing results, one official quipped, "When it's negative, they give the results to us." As of May 2020, the only hospital in Sanaa that has the full capacity to treat coronavirus is the Kuwait University Hospital. An influx of patients entered this hospital in the first week of May, and health workers believe many of them had coronavirus; Houthi authorities never revealed the test results, but an internal document from 4 May 2020, showing three positive test results, was circulated widely on social media.

== Transport and communications ==
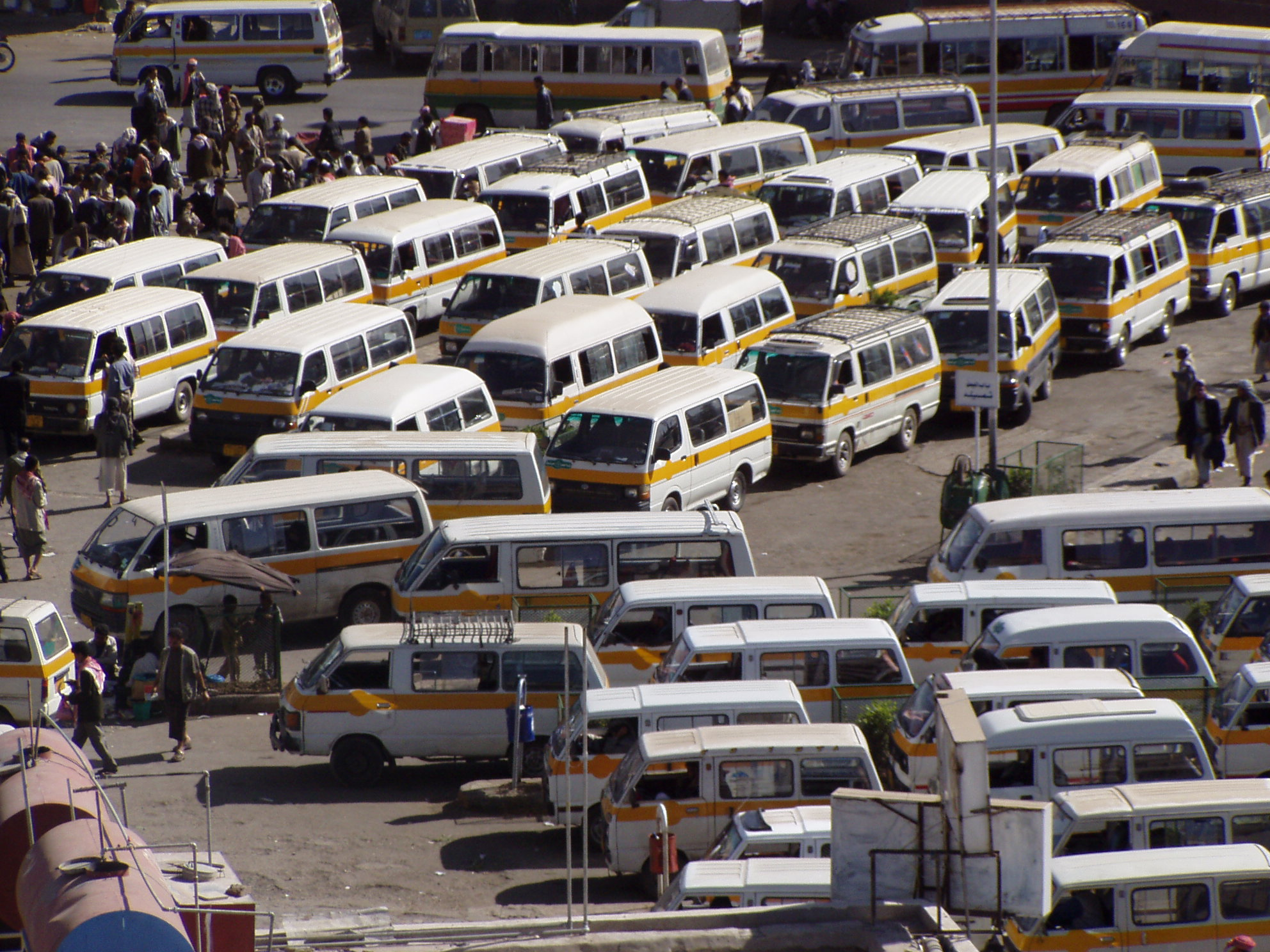
A few of Sanaa's many dababs

Transport in Sanaa is divided by gender, with a slight majority (51%) of male commuters using public transport and a similar majority (56%) of women travelling on foot. In both cases, using personally owned cars was less prevalent than public transport (51% vs. 29% for men, and 25% vs. 20% for women). Use of bicycles and motorcycles is less; only 5% of male commuters and a negligible percentage of female commuters reported using them as primary modes of transport.

Public transport in Sanaa is primarily informal, with most vehicles being privately owned. Common passenger vehicles include microbuses (dababs), which in 2005 were estimated to number 4-7,000 in Sanaa; minibuses ("nuss-bus"), estimated at 5,500–7,300; and taxis, which are more common at around 33,000. Public transport in the city centre is well-developed, with frequently available bus and minibus services and several bus terminals (most terminals are informal), but the Sanaa outskirts are poorly served by comparison and often people "must walk long distances to reach one of the major roads." Most routes are short, meaning that longer north–south trips require switching buses multiple times. Additionally, the number of buses on the roads can vary from day to day, since bus driver licenses do not require drivers to operate on a regular schedule. This can lead to long waiting times. There are also coaches to major cities such as Aden and Taiz.

Sanaa has an extensive road network, which is where most formal investment has taken place. The city's roads are mostly north–south, with two major ring roads traversing the city. The highest volumes of traffic are within the inner ring road. Roads are often congested, which is compounded by the fact that many of the city's 33,000 taxi cabs often operate empty, and there is a high level of air pollution as a result. This air pollution is exacerbated by the fact that, like Mexico City or Kathmandu, Sanaa is located in an upland "bowl" surrounded by mountains, which creates thermal inversions that trap pollutants.

Sanaa has the most traffic accidents in Yemen, with 2,898 in 2013, more than twice as many as Taiz (which had the second-highest total). Contributing factors include lax enforcement of traffic laws, lack of traffic signals, lack of pedestrian crossings, and bad parking practices (for example, double parking is common, even when there are available parking spaces nearby). The number of traffic accidents plummeted in 2015 by more than 50%, as the escalation of the conflict in Yemen led to reduced mobility, as well as fuel shortages which led to decreased use of personal vehicles.

In 2017, the Saudi blockade of Yemen caused fuel costs to rise by over 100% in Sanaa, crippling transport systems and making it even harder for people to access clean water, food, and healthcare. By August 2019, the price of diesel had reached 430 rials per litre, which was a 186.7% increase from the pre-war price; at the same time, the price of gasoline had risen to 365 rials per litre, which was a 143.3% increase over the same period.

=== Air transport ===
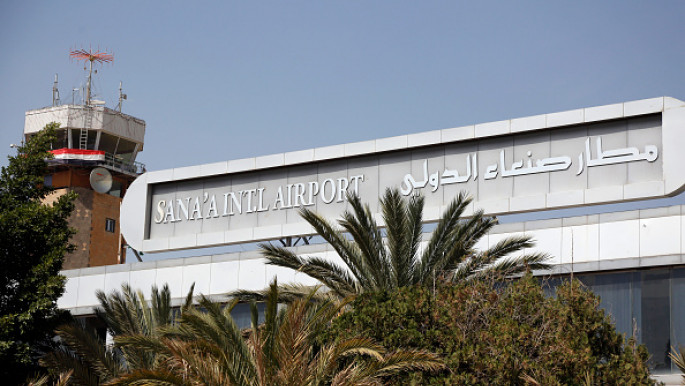
The Sanaa International Airport

Sanaa International Airport is Yemen's main domestic and international airport, handling 80% of all air passengers in the country in 2007. The airport sustained heavy damage during the ongoing conflict in Yemen, and has been closed for commercial flights since August 2016. This has prevented many Yemenis from being able to travel abroad to receive medical treatment. In addition, at the start of the Saudi blockade, the Sanaa airport was completely shut down for 16 days until being reopened to humanitarian flights on 22 November. A new Sanaa Airport started construction in 2008 but stopped in 2011 and has not resumed since. On 26 December 2024, the airport's control tower was destroyed due to an Israeli airstrike targeting Houthi forces who made use of the place. The airstrike caused substantial damage to infrastructure.

Yemenia, the national airline of Yemen, has its head office in Sanaa.

=== Communications ===
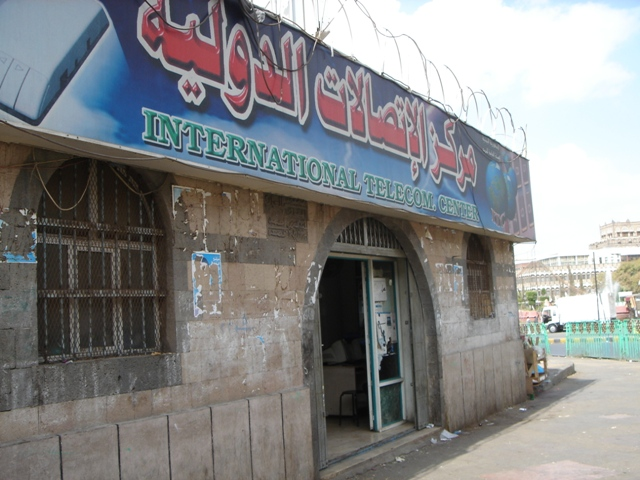
Internet cafe in Sanaa, 2006

Most of Yemen's telecommunications infrastructure is located in Sanaa, as are most of the country's telecommunications companies.

The Internet was first launched in Yemen in 1996, but it was used by under 5% of the population until 2007. The percentage of Yemenis using the internet nationwide has increased from 1.25% in 2006 to 26.72% in 2017. In Sanaa, the main internet service provider is YemenNet, which was launched in 2002 and is the only network offering 3G services.

Internet cafes are popular among Sanaa residents, many of whom cannot afford the high cost of subscription fees and purchasing necessary equipment. They are especially popular with university students, who use publicly available information on the internet to supplement their studies. The first all-female internet cafe in Sanaa opened in 2013. As of 2017, the city of Sanaa had 407 internet cafes, which was almost a third of the total in Yemen. A survey of 45 internet cafes in 2018 reported that 38 were fully or partially operating, while 7 were permanently closed. One of them was operating on solar power, which provided 18 hours of electricity per day.

== Water and sanitation ==
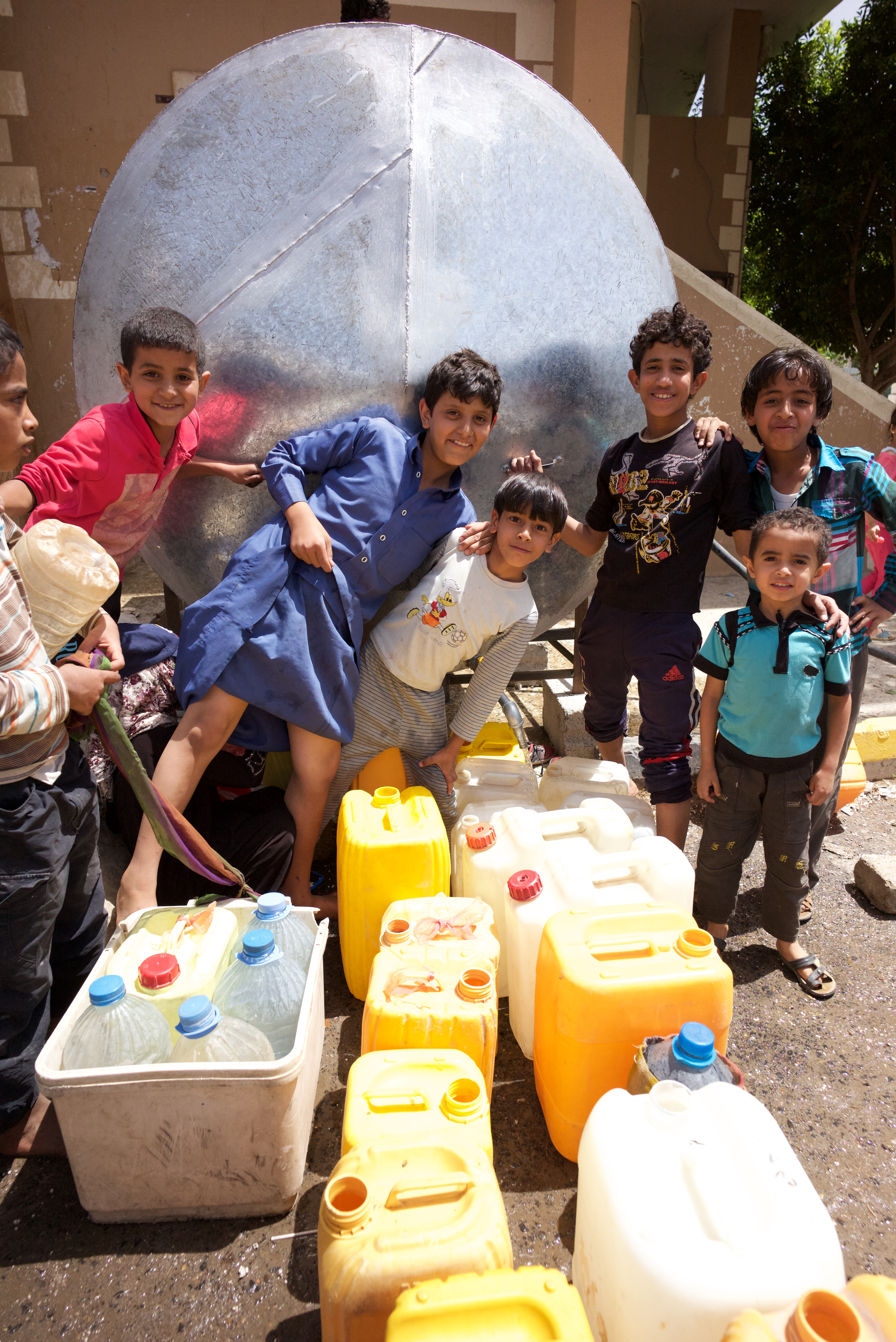
A UNICEF project to provide water in Sanaa, 2015

Yemen is one of the world's most water-scarce countries, and Sanaa could be the first national capital in the world to completely exhaust its water supply. The city is located on the Tawilah aquifer, which was first identified in 1972. The aquifer has a natural recharge rate of 42 Mm^{3}/a, much of which comes from the periodic outflow of water from the surrounding wadis onto the Sanaa plain. There is not much refill from rainfall. In 1995, water extraction from the aquifer exceeded the natural recharge rate by around 300%. More recent estimates are higher, suggesting 400–500%. This has caused groundwater levels to drop by 6 to 8 metres annually, to the point that many wells have to be drilled as far down as 2,600 to 3,900 feet. It is estimated that, with a slightly lower rate of depletion, the aquifer will be completely exhausted by around 2030.

As much as 90% of Yemen's water use is in agriculture, with irrigated farmland increasing from 37,000 hectares in 1970 to 407,000 in 2004. Before the 1970s, traditional agricultural practices had a sustainable balance of use and recharge. Household water in Sanaa was supplied by shallow wells, and the relative scarcity of water led to people using gray water for watering gardens. Meanwhile, agriculture in the surrounding rural areas was watered by rainfall, with terracing and flood diversion systems making as much as possible out of the limited rainwater. However, after the introduction of deep tube wells and the identification of the Tawilah aquifer, there was an explosion of agriculture in the Sanaa area. By 1995, there were over 5,000 wells in the Sanaa area; as of 2010, the number was about 13,500. At the same time, traditionally grown, drought-resistant crops have been largely replaced by more water-intensive cash crops such as citrus, bananas, grapes, vegetables, and especially qat, which as of 2010 accounted for 6% of Yemen's entire GDP. In the Sanaa area, 27% of all farmland was dedicated to growing qat; By 2010, the number had increased to around 50%.

In the city of Sanaa itself, there was a continuous expansion of tap water supply under the National Water and Sanitation Authority (NSWA) through the end of the 1990s, but it was outpaced by the city's growth. The public water supply only served 40–50% of Sanaa residents by 2000. The percentage has decreased in recent years: in 2009, it was estimated that 55% of residents were connected to the public water supply; in 2018, only 43% did. For residents without access to the municipal water network, the only option for drinking water is from tanker trucks, which is expensive. Access to tap water is also inconsistent between neighbourhoods, and even in places where there is public water, water pressure can be too low, resulting in unreliable access for some households. Most households have access to water for less than one full day per week. There are also problems with pipe leakage, with estimates ranging from 40% to 60% of water being lost due to leaks.

Additionally, there are problems with water quality in Sanaa due to wastewater getting into water pipes and also leaching down into the aquifer. A 2018 study found the water exceeded the limits for dissolved solids and coliform bacteria, including E. coli. Sanaanis tend to view the city's tap water as contaminated, choosing instead to buy filtered water in containers for drinking and cooking, which costs significantly more. Private kiosks using reverse osmosis to filter poor-quality groundwater are also popular.

As of 2009, the average domestic water consumption in Sanaa was just 30 to 50 litres per day, which is far below the usual amount for city dwellers in the Middle East.

In the pre-modern era, Sanaa used an irrigation called ghayls. These ran from external towns in peripheral areas and brought water into the city. They were responsible for much of Sanaa's water supply for most of its history.

=== Wastewater management ===
The sewer system in Sanaa is over 500 kilometres long. There are two activated sludge water treatment plants in the city: the main one, in Bani al-Harith District, was commissioned in 2000 and has a daily capacity of 50,500m^{3}; the second, in al-Hashishiyah, is much smaller with a capacity of 500m^{3} and is dedicated to collecting wastewater from tankers. No damage was reported to the Bani al-Harith water treatment plant as of 2018, and it remains in operation, although overloaded and with some equipment in poor condition. The al-Hashishiyah facility has been out of operation since the start of the conflict.

Only 40% of Sanaa's population is connected to wastewater services as of 2018 (down from 45% in 2014), and over half of the population relies on private cesspits for wastewater disposal. The wastewater is then either absorbed into the ground or pumped out by either the city's Wastewater and Sanitation Local Corporation or by private services. Of Sanaa's 35 informal settlements, only two (Madhbah and Bayt Maiyad) are connected to the city's sewer system, while most of the others rely on cesspits. In one, Suq Shamlan, sewage is dumped in an open hole.

=== Solid waste management ===
It is estimated that 1500 tonnes of solid waste are generated each day in the Sanaa metro area. The city is mainly serviced by the al-Azraqayn landfill, which also serves the surrounding Sanaa Governorate as well as 'Amran Governorate. The landfill has been in operation since the 1970s and has almost reached full capacity. There is no base or surface sealing at the site, so the leachate is not captured. A facility for the treatment of healthcare waste exists at the al-Azraqayn landfill; the first of its type in Yemen, it was expected to open in March 2015, but due to the ongoing conflict and lack of electricity, the opening was delayed indefinitely.

Since the escalation of the Yemeni civil war in 2015, the Azraqayn landfill has no longer been operating at full capacity. Waste collection was reduced to 30 trips per month, and only some of the collected waste made it from the transfer station to the landfill. The waste processing building at the al-Azraqayn site was destroyed in 2015, and the landfill's weighbridge is damaged and not operational. As of 2018, almost a third of the city's garbage trucks had been damaged during the fighting and another 18% were not operational. Most Sanaa neighbourhoods in 2018 reported insufficient coverage by waste management services. As of 2018, the city's waste collection services cover 70% of the city's population, which is higher than al-Hudaydah (50%) but lower than Aden (80%).

As of August 2015, the city of Sanaa employed 19 people as waste pickers for use in recycling: 4 at al-Azraqayn and 15 (12 men and 3 boys) at Sanaa Transit Station.

== International relations ==
=== Twin towns and sister cities ===
- Ankara, Turkey
- Cairo, Egypt
- Dushanbe, Tajikistan
- Tehran, Iran

== Gallery ==
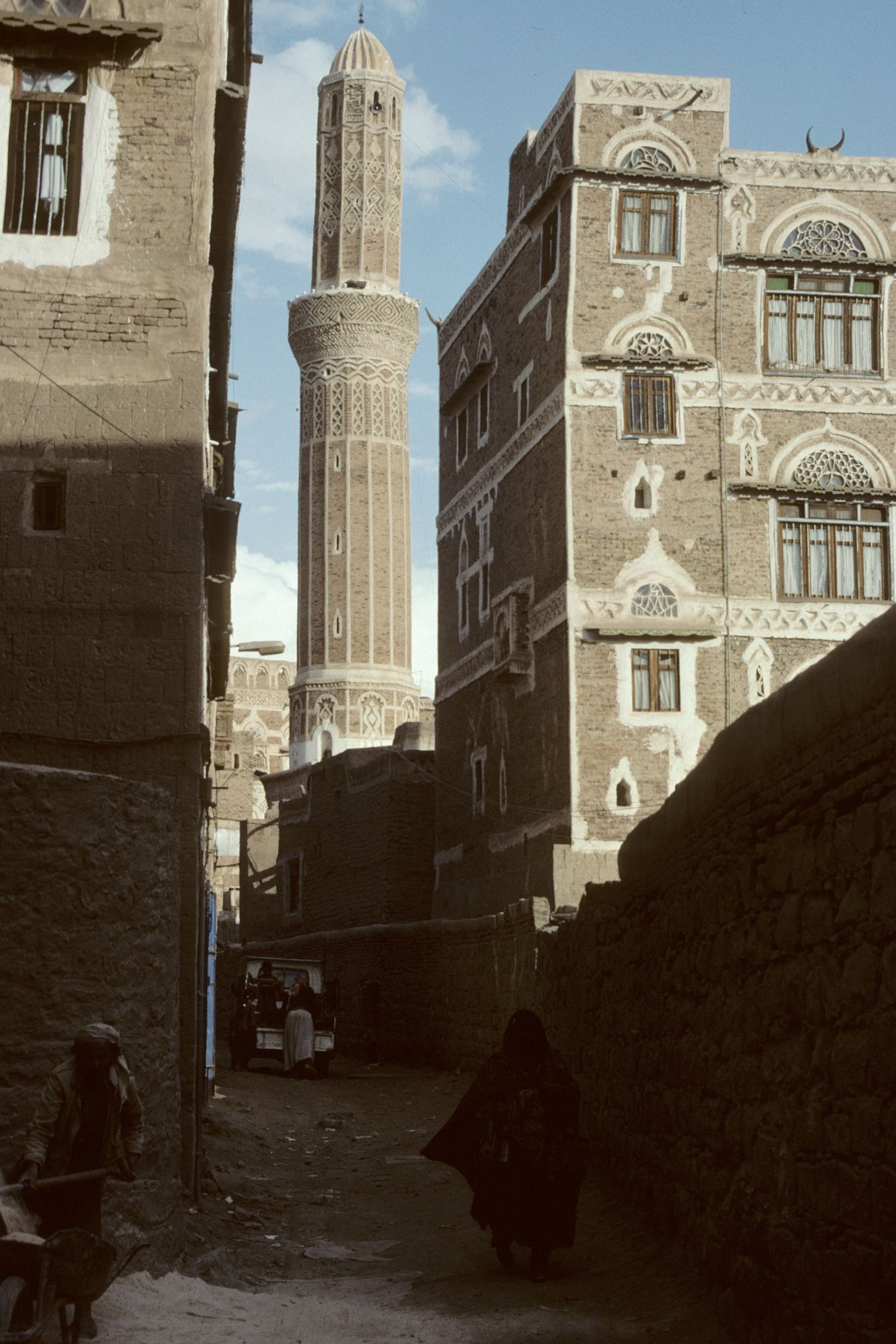
Houses in old Sana'a. Ibex and Bull were sacred animals in ancient Yemen. Yemenis put Ibex or Bull horns at top of houses to protect from evil eyes.

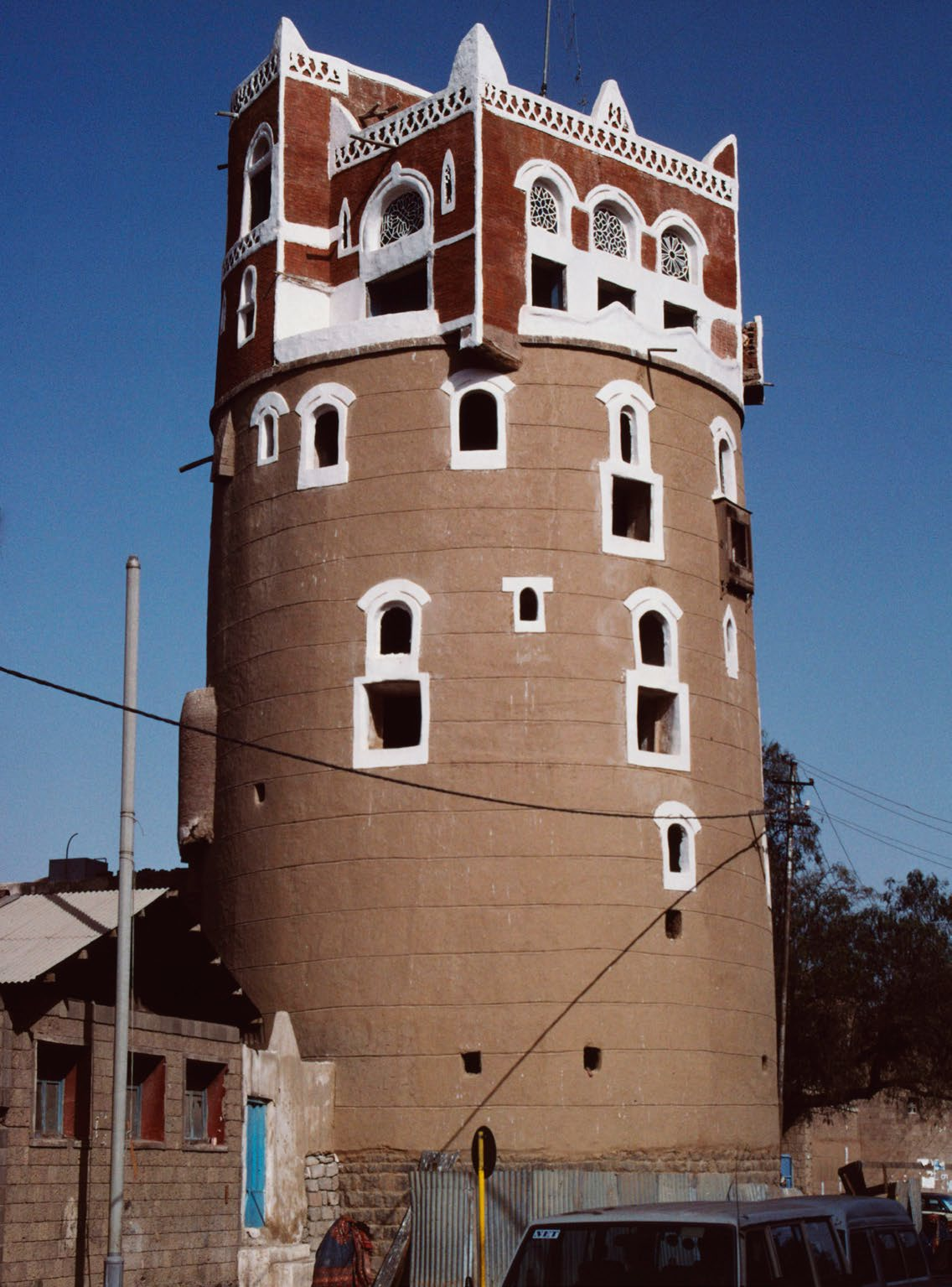
A house in Sanaa

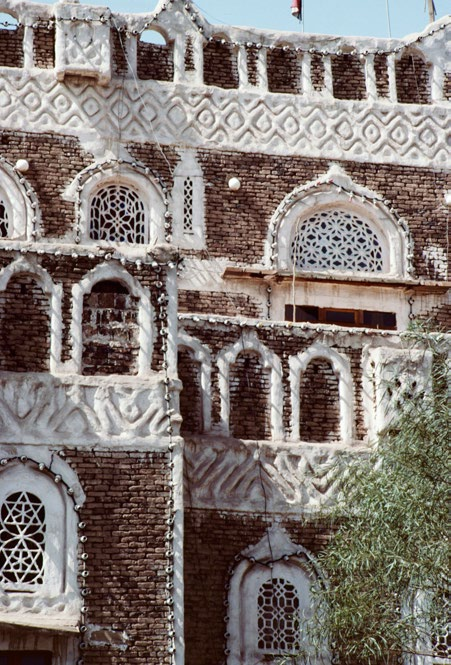
House with traditional ''Qamariah''

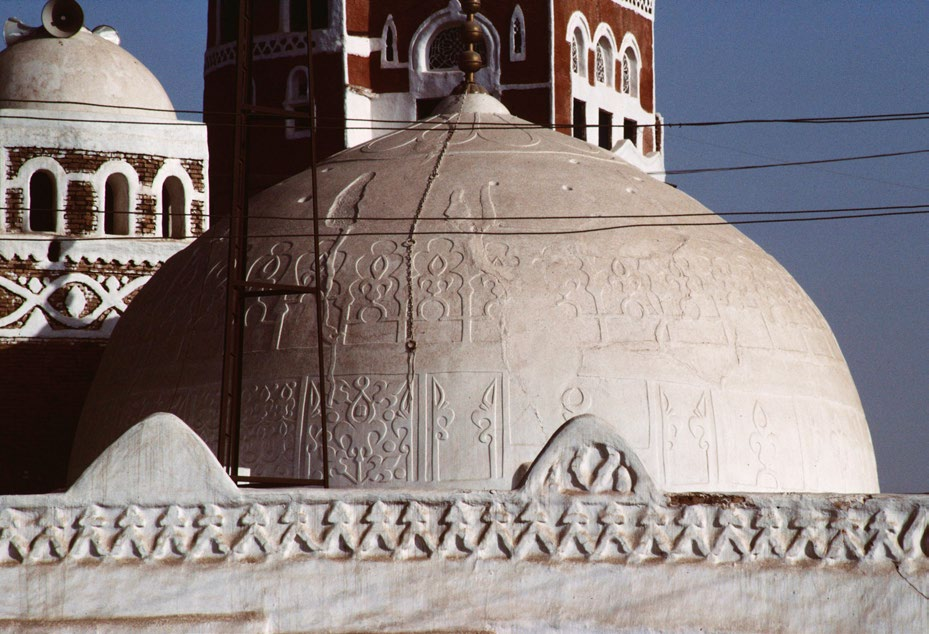
A dome in old Sanaa

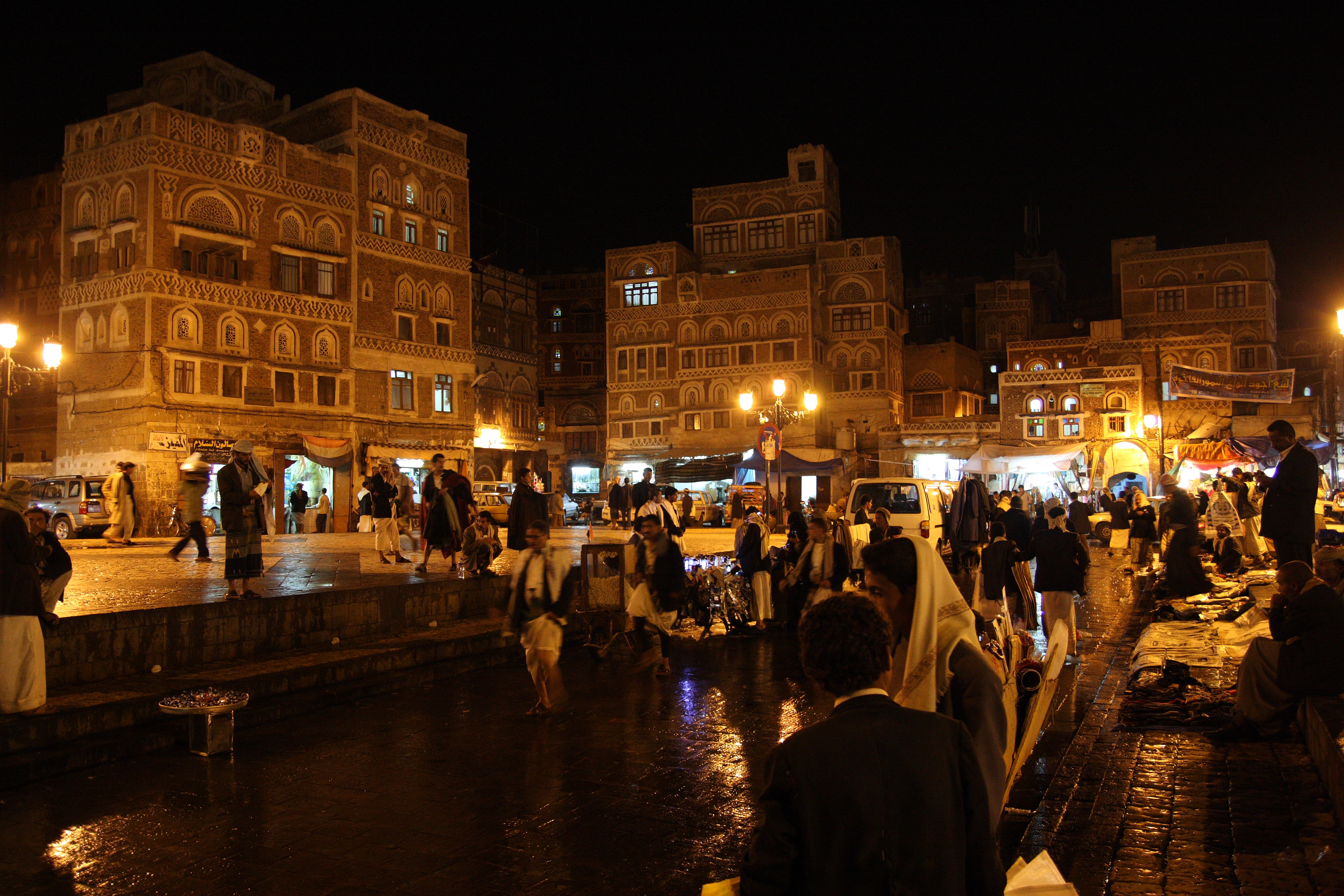
Night streetscene in Sanaa

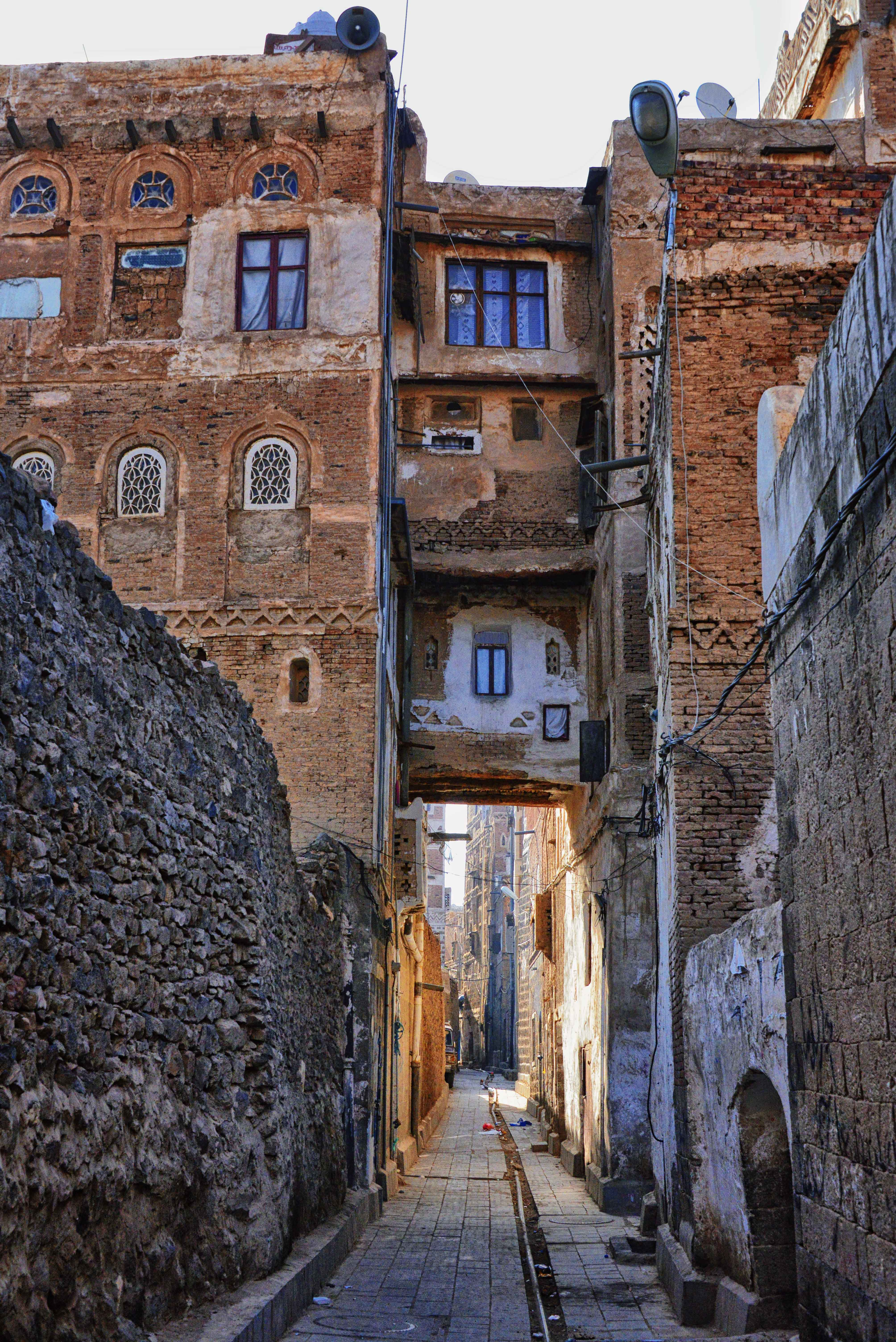
Narrow street in Sanaa

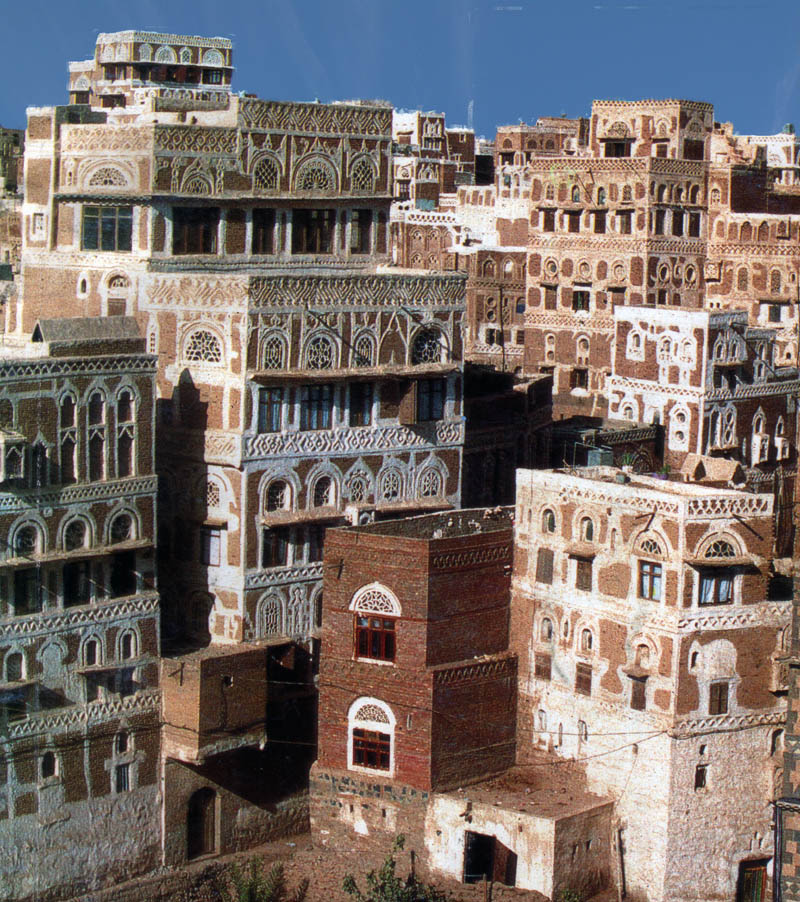
Tower houses in Sanaa

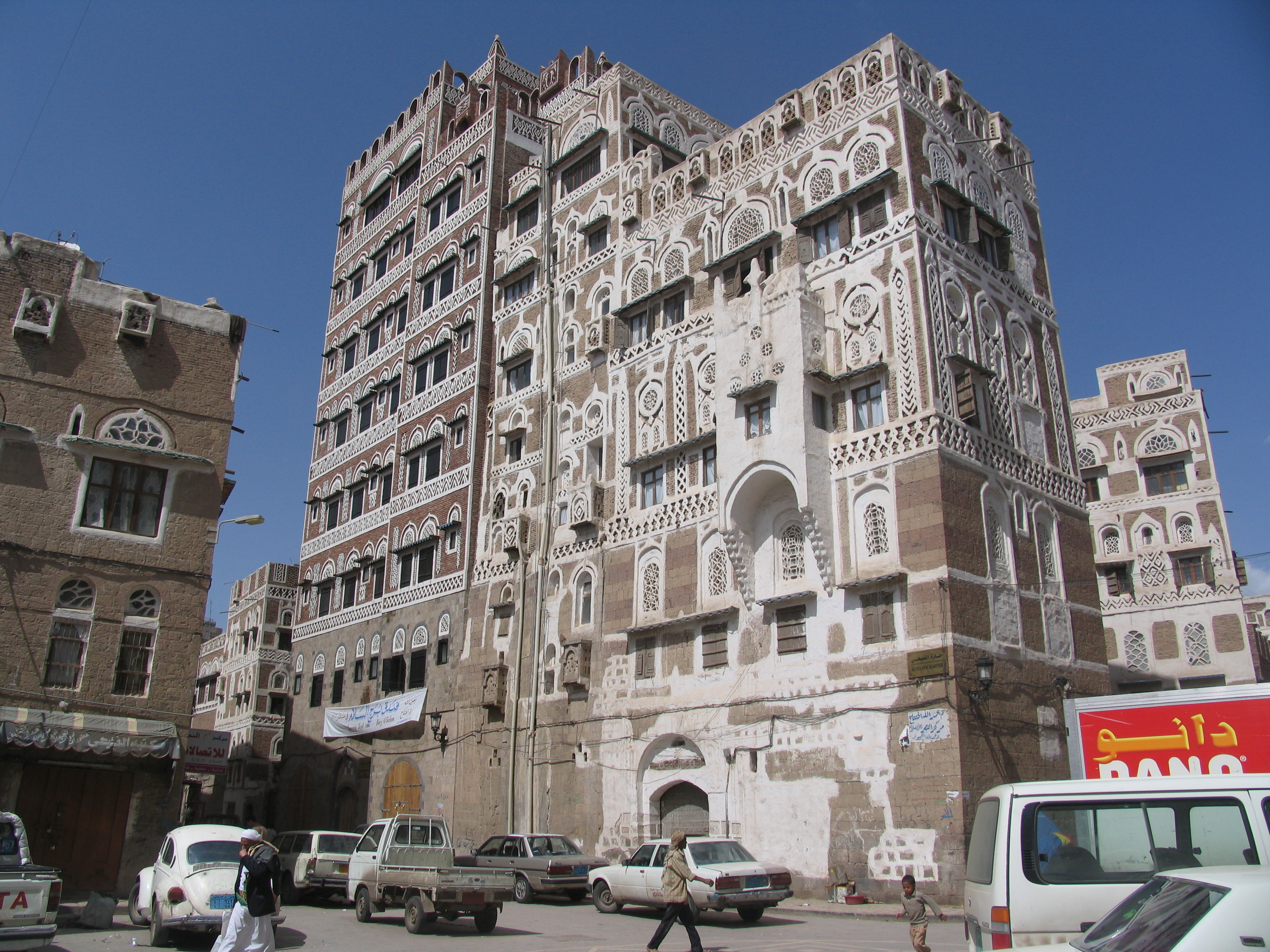
Tower houses in Sanaa

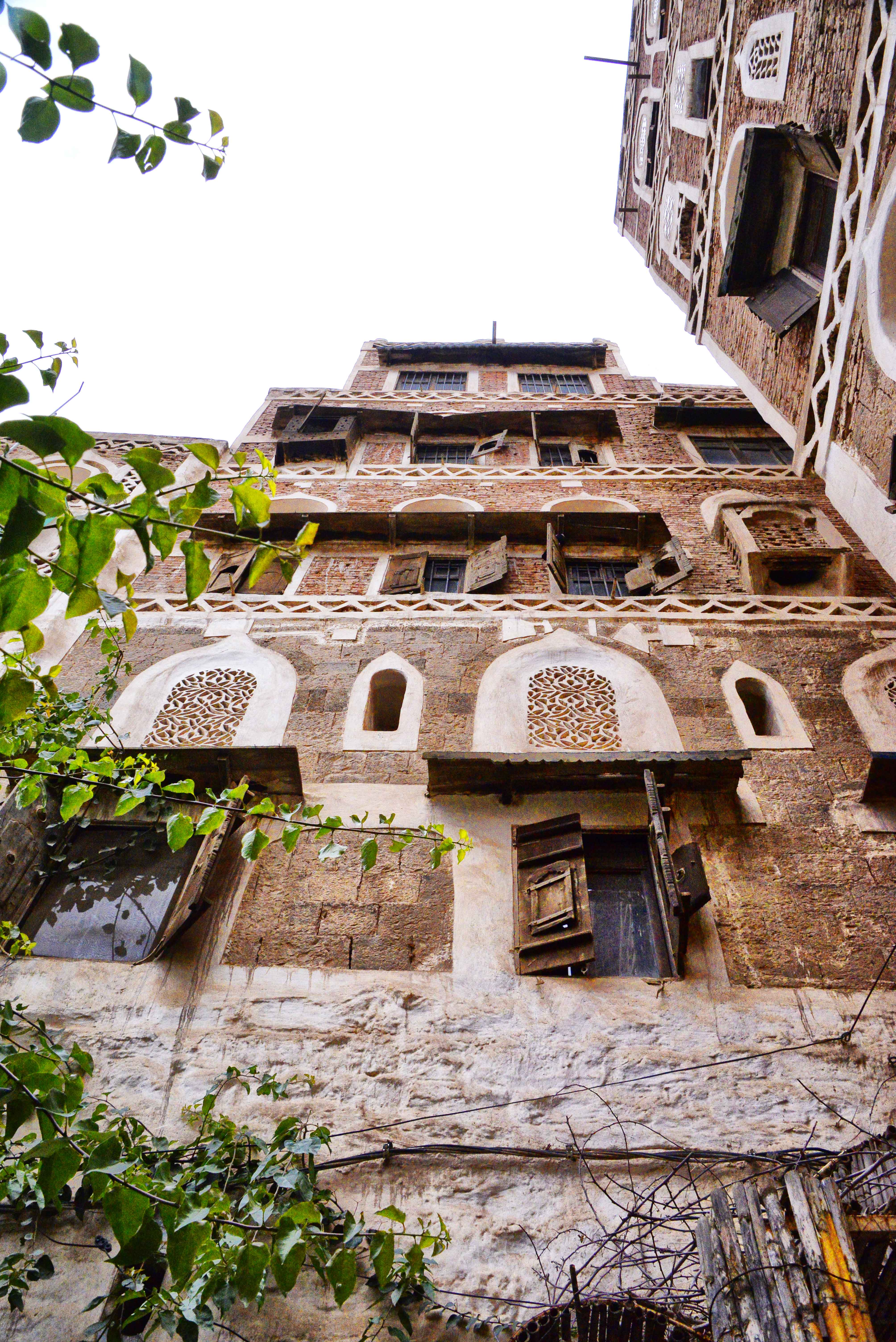
Ground-level view of a tower house

== See also ==
- Mahwa Aser
- Sanaa manuscript – fragments from over 1,000 early Quranic codices, discovered at the Great Mosque in Sanaa in 1972
- Jabal Tiyal, a high mountain near Sanaa
- Yemeni revolution
- War crimes in the Yemeni civil war (2014–present)
