= Dame (disambiguation) =

Dame is a female noble title equivalent to "sir" for knights. Dame or Dames may also refer to:

== People ==
- Dame (surname), a surname
- Dames (surname), a surname
- A nickname of NBA player Damian Lillard
- A title of respect for certain Benedictine nuns equivalent to the male "Dom"
- A term for a matron at Eton College

== Places ==
- Damè, a town and arrondissement in southern Benin

=== Facilities and structures ===
- The Dame, a music hall in Lexington, Kentucky, United States
- Delhi Airport Metro Express, an express line of the Delhi Metro network.
- Dame (restaurant), a restaurant in New York City

== Arts and entertainment ==
- Dames (film), a 1934 Warner Bros. musical comedy film
- Pantomime dame

=== Music ===
- "Dame" (Luis Miguel song), 1996 song by Luis Miguel
- "Dame" (RBD song), 2006 song by RBD
- Dame (band), an American rock band

=== Games ===
- An old word for the game pieces in the game of draughts or checkers
- Dame (Go), a term in game of Go

== See also ==
- Notre Dame (disambiguation)
- Madame (disambiguation)
- Madam (disambiguation)
- Damsel (disambiguation)
