= Thaqban =

Thaqban ثقبان
- Village
- Location in Yemen
- Coordinates: 15.43982°N 44.1487°E
- Country: Yemen
- Governorate: Sanaa
- District: Hamdan
- Elevation: 7,454 ft (2,272 m)
- Time zone: UTC+3 (Yemen Standard Time)

Thaqban (Arabic: ثقبان Thaqbān) is a village in Bani al-Harith District of Amanat al-Asimah Governorate, Yemen. It is located just south of the point where the Wadi Zahr opens out onto the Sanaa plain. It is part of the 'uzlah of Qaryat al-Qabil.

== Name and history ==
The 10th-century writer al-Hamdani related a legend about the village of Thaqban in his Iklil and wrote that Thaqban takes its name from one Thaqban b. Nawf b. Sharaḥbīl, of the tribe of Himyar.
