= ʽAlman =

ʽAlman علمان
- Village
- Location in Yemen
- Coordinates: 15.46236°N 44.14274°E
- Country: Yemen
- Governorate: Sanaa
- District: Bani al-Harith
- Elevation: 7,320 ft (2,231 m)
- Time zone: UTC+3 (Yemen Standard Time)

ʽAlman (Arabic: علمان ʽAlmān), also ʽUlman, is a village in Bani al-Harith District of Amanat al-Asimah Governorate, Yemen. It is located on the northern side of the lower end of the Wadi Dahr.

== History ==
According to the 10th-century writer al-Hamdani, ʽAlman was negatively affected by the collapse of the Rayʽan dam in 859; it had previously been under extensive cultivation, but after the dam collapsed the water supply dwindled. References by historical writers also indicate that ʽAlman may have been the site of a pre-Islamic palace.

== See also ==
- Qaryat al-Qabil, the main village in the area, just to the southwest
