= Ad Dummam =

Ad-Dummam الدمم
- Village
- Location in Yemen
- Coordinates: 15.40781°N 44.0412°E
- Country: Yemen
- Governorate: Sanaa
- District: Hamdan
- Elevation: 8,638 ft (2,633 m)
- Time zone: UTC+3 (Yemen Standard Time)

Ad-Dummam (Arabic: الدمم ad-Dummam) is a village in Hamdan District of Sanaa Governorate, Yemen.

== History ==
According to Robert T.O. Wilson, ad-Dummam is "certainly" the same place as the "ad-Dumwam" mentioned several times by the 10th-century writer Abu Muhammad al-Hasan al-Hamdani in his Sifat Jazirat al-Arab.
