= Luluwah =

Luluwah لولوة
- Village
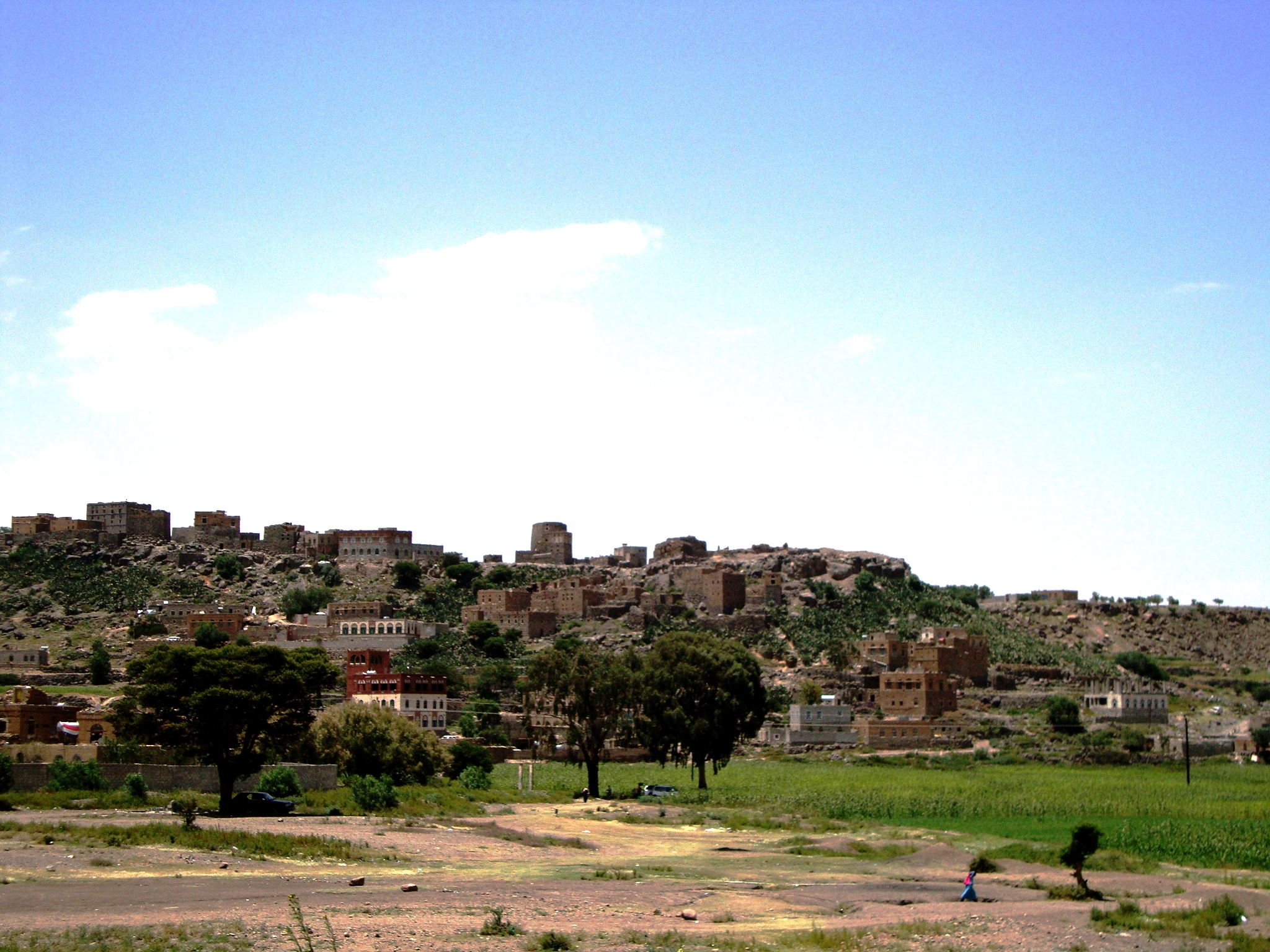
- View of Luluwah from the Sanaa-Hudaydah road

- Location in Yemen
- Coordinates: 15.39026°N 44.07755°E
- Country: Yemen
- Governorate: Sanaa
- District: Hamdan
- Elevation: 8,058 ft (2,456 m)
- Time zone: UTC+3 (Yemen Standard Time)

Luluwah (Arabic: لولوة), also Lu'lu'ah, is a village in Hamdan District of Sanaa Governorate, Yemen. It is located in the upper reaches of the Wadi Zahr, below Rayʽan and above the beginning of the wadi proper at Suq Bayt Naʽam. Surface water here forms a stream which flows into the Wadi Zahr at Suq Bayt Naʽam; this stream was historically known as the Ghayl Luluwah.

== History ==
Luluwah is mentioned several times in the Ghayat al-amani of Yahya ibn al-Husayn, with the first mention being in 859 (245 AH). The same text also mentions a fort at Luluwah, although "it cannot have been a large one."
