= Qaryat al-Qabil =

Qaryat al-Qabil قرية القابل
- Village
- Location in Yemen
- Coordinates: 15.45033°N 44.12768°E
- Country: Yemen
- Governorate: Sanaa
- District: Bani al-Harith
- Elevation: 7,380 ft (2,250 m)
- Time zone: UTC+3 (Yemen Standard Time)

Qaryat al-Qabil (Arabic: قرية القابل Qaryat al Qābil), often called simply al-Qaryah, is a village in Bani al-Harith District of Amanat al-Asimah Governorate, Yemen. It is the largest settlement in the Wadi Zahr area.

== History ==
The earliest known historical reference to Qaryat al-Qabil is in 1297 CE (696 AH). In 1545 (952 AH), it was described as a walled town, but it doesn't seem to have been a military center, and no traces of the walls remain today. Historically, it was overlooked by a fort called Hisn Ūd.

== Nearby places ==
- Dar al-Hajar
- Thaqban
- ʽAlman
- Dhahaban
- Suq Bayt Naʽam
