= Dhu Jadan al-Himyari =

Yemeni poet

- علقمة بن ذي جدن الحميري
- Born: 6th century Yemen
- Died: 7th century
- Occupation: Poet
- Writing career
- Language: Arabic
- Notable works: Poems about the fortresses of Yemen

ʿAlqama bin Dhi Jadan al-Himyari (Arabic: علقمة بن ذي جدن الحميري) also Dhu Jadan al-Himyari (Arabic: ذو جدن الحميري) (fl. 6th - 7th century) was an Arab poet from Yemen. He was noted in particular for his poems about the fortresses of Yemen and their destruction including Ghumdan Palace, Baynun Fortress and Silhin Fortress.

== Poetry ==
Dhu Jadan's poetry has been compiled in the eighth volume of Al-Iklil of Abu Muhammad al-Hasan al-Hamdani.

An example of the poems he wrote is his eulogy to the Ghumdan Palace after its destruction: (Note: Ghumdan Palace was destroyed between 525–530 CE by the Aksumite garrison which invaded Yemen and overthrew the Himyarite Kingdom.)

You have heard of Ghumdan's towers:
From the mountain top it lowers
Well carpentered, with stones for stay,
Plastered with clean, damp, slippery clay;
Oil lamps within it show
At even like the lightening's glow.
This once-new castle is ashes today
The flames have eaten its beauty away.
