= 2013 Yemeni Ministry of Defense attack =

2013 militant attack in Yemen

Yemeni Ministry of Defense attack
- Part of the Yemeni crisis and the al-Qaeda insurgency in Yemen
- Smoke rising from the Ministry of Defense complex.
- Location: 15.34966°N 44.21202°E; Bab al-Yemen neighbourhood, Sanaa, Yemen
- Date: 5 December 2013 c. 9:00 a.m. – c. 4:30 p.m. AST (UTC+03:00)
- Target: Al-Oradi hospital in the Yemeni Defense Ministry complex
- Attack type: Suicide car bombing, mass shooting
- Weapons: SVBIED, assault rifles, grenades, RPG's
- Deaths: 52
- Injuries: 167
- Perpetrator: Al-Qaeda in the Arabian Peninsula: Ansar al-Sharia
- No. of participants: 12
- Motive: United States drone strikes in Yemen

On 5 December 2013, a coordinated terrorist attack occurred targeting the Ministry of Defense complex in Sanaa, Yemen. Heavily armed militants utilized a car bomb to breach the gates of the complex before storming it and occupying a hospital within it. The attack, which killed 52 people and injured 167, was claimed by Ansar al-Sharia, an affiliate of al-Qaeda in the Arabian Peninsula (AQAP). AQAP later issued an apology for the attack after footage from within the hospital was broadcast showing the gunmen murdering medical personnel.

== Background ==
AQAP and its local affiliate Ansar al-Sharia gained significant strength amid the Yemeni revolution in 2011, which allowed them to seize territory in southern Yemen while the central government was preoccupied. Despite this, terrorist attacks were still rare in Sanaa due to heavy security and AQAP's preoccupation with battling Yemeni forces in the southern governorates. After the government launched a military offensive against them in 2012 and the United States intensified their drone campaign, AQAP began launching several attacks against government and security targets in the capital such as with the Unity Day parade rehearsal bombing in May 2012, a suicide bombing at a police academy in July and a car bombing which attempted to assassinate Defense Minister Mohammed Nasser Ahmed in September. Despite losing their territory in the south, the group continued waging large attacks, such as in September 2013 when AQAP fighters attacked two military installations in southern Yemen, killing 21 soldiers. In November 2013, two AQAP gunmen on a motorcycle killed a Belarusian defence contractor. The Yemeni government introduced a new security plan for Sanaa on 2 December in response to the shooting, which included provisions such as banning motorcycles within the central part of the capital.

Located within the edge of the Bab al-Yemen neighbourhood, the Yemeni Ministry of Defense complex, which houses the presidential office, minister of defense and military chief of staff, is regarded as one of the most important and secure facilities in the country. Within the complex contains the al-Oradi hospital which is used by military and civil state senior officials and hosts foreign workers. A month prior to the attack, two army vehicles had reportedly disappeared according to military officials. The security chief at the defense ministry compound was replaced two weeks prior to the attack. One week prior, the defense ministry was warned that a major attack in Sanaa was imminent, leading to authorities allocating additional security forces at the compound. The Yemeni defense minister, who had previously been the subject of multiple assassination attempts by AQAP, was meeting with the U.S. government in Washington, D.C. on the day of the attack. At the time the attack began, a planned meeting of top military commanders was set to take place, though it was unexpectedly delayed at the last minute.

== Attack ==
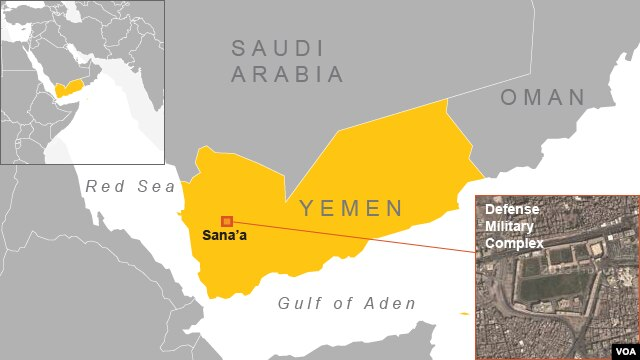
Location and overhead view of the compound

AQAP gunmen dressed in army uniforms opened fire on the guards outside of the eastern gate of the defense ministry complex, killing four guards and three militants. After killing the guards, an AQAP suicide bomber rammed a pickup truck loaded with 500 kg of explosives through the western gate into the complex at around 9:00 a.m. AST (UTC+03:00). The suicide bomber reportedly failed to reach his target inside the complex due to gunfire from Yemeni forces, instead blowing up near the entrance of the al-Oradi hospital. The explosion blew out the windows and doors of nearby homes and offices in the complex and destroyed an armored military vehicle along with three other cars. Witnesses described the initial blast violently shaking the ground near the complex and in the Bab al-Yemen district, with large plumes of smoke soon rising from the building.

Minutes after the bombing, a second vehicle containing 12 AQAP gunmen in military uniforms armed with assault rifles, hand grenades and rocket-propelled grenades drove through the gate and opened fired on the soldiers present. Yemeni forces besieged the militants near the gate entrance before they could reach the defense ministry building in the complex. The militants split into two groups; one storming a laboratory and the other occupying the hospital, close by to the gate from which they entered. Within the hospital, the gunmen indiscriminately killed soldiers, doctors, nurses, and patients. According to witnesses, one of the militants "pulled a Western doctor and a Filipino nurse into the hospital's courtyard and shot them in front of local staff." CCTV footage showed several scenes from the attack, including a militant calmly walking towards a huddling group of doctors and nurses before throwing a grenade at them, as well as a militant shooting unarmed surgeons at point-blank range. Some Filipino workers in the hospital reportedly survived the attack by playing dead.

Yemeni soldiers and police officers engaged in an hours long firefight with the militants after they breached the compound. Three militants were killed within the hospital after Yemeni forces raided and secured it. Another two were killed after escaping from the hospital into a mosque in the complex. Security forces launched a manhunt in Sanaa to find the perpetrators of the attack, killing five militants and losing one Yemeni commando. All of the militants were killed by 4:30 p.m. AST according to the investigative committee for the attack. Despite this, several sources said that the fighting continued throughout the rest of the day into 6 December.

== Victims ==
The attack killed 52 people and injured 167, of which nine were wounded seriously. Victims of the attack included 31 army officers, including three colonels, civilians as well as medical personnel working at the hospital, where most of the casualties occurred. Officials said that seven foreign workers were killed within the hospital, them being two German aid workers for development agency Deutsche Gesellschaft für Internationale Zusammenarbeit (GIZ), two doctors from Vietnam, two nurses from the Philippines and a nurse from India. The Filipino government stated that seven Filipinos including a doctor had been killed and 10 more were injured. Among the Yemenis killed in the hospital attack included three doctors, five patients, including senior Yemeni judge Abduljaleel Noman and his wife, a local GIZ worker and a relative of President Abdrabbuh Mansur Hadi.

== Perpetrators ==
In a message posted on 6 December by the al-Malahem Media account on Twitter, AQAP affiliate Ansar al-Sharia claimed responsibility for conducting the attack. The group said that they targeted the Ministry of Defense due to the presence of "rooms for controlling unmanned drones and a number of American experts." It stated that the "mujahideen have heavily struck one of these rooms in Defense Ministry headquarters" as it believed the site to be a “legitimate target” due to being used by Americans against "this Muslim nation."

=== Apology ===
After the attack, Yemeni state-television broadcast CCTV footage from within the hospital showcasing the events. Advisor to President Hadi Fares Al-Saqqaf said the footage was intended to show that the attack targeted a civilian facility as opposed to a military one, swaying public opinion against AQAP. The release of the footage lead to public outrage among Yemenis and even AQAP supporters, prompting the group initially deny it as fake in social media posts on the internet. According Yemen Post editor-in-chief Hakim Almasmari, the broadcast of the attack "did a great deal of damage to the group's image among ordinary Yemenis who may have been ambivalent about the group's goals."

On 21 December, AQAP released a video in which senior leader Qasim al-Raymi apologized for the attack on the hospital. Raymi said that the group ordered the militants not to attack the hospital or mosque in the complex but one gunman had done so anyways. He offered apologies and condolences to the families of the victims and said that the group would agree to pay blood money to those killed in the hospital. However, Raymi stated that AQAP is “continuing with our jihad” and reiterated the groups claim that the Ministry of Defense was housing drone control rooms and American experts, defending it as a legitimate target. He warned that the group would attack other military posts which "cooperate with the American drones by spying, planting chips, providing information or offering intelligence advice".

== Investigation ==
Hours after the attack, President Hadi ordered a high-level military commission led by Yemeni Armed Forces Chief of Staff Ahmed al-Ashwal to conduct an investigation into the attack. The commission completed its report by the next day, with investigators suspecting that army sympathizers may have helped facilitate the attack. The report proclaimed that seven of the militants involved in the attack were Saudi nationals who had recently entered the country from Hadhramaut governorate using fake names of Yemenis deported from Saudi Arabia, though the claim was labeled "unsubstantiated" by Amnesty International. Security officials believed that the attack was organized and carried out by an AQAP cell of 16 to 25 people.

Yemeni security forces arrested four militants within the complex on the day of the attack. Information acquired through the investigation led to the discovery of two car bombs and the launch of a manhunt against five suspected militants in Sanaa. An additional two AQAP members were arrested by 8 December; the leader of the AQAP cell responsible for the attack and the one who reported its success. The militants were arrested outside of Sanaa by authorities using GPS tracking to monitor the location of their cell phones.

== Reactions ==
=== Domestic ===
Shortly after the complex was secured, President Hadi visited the hospital to inspect the scene and meet with military officials. The Supreme Security Commission, a committee of top military and intelligence officials led by Hadi, stated that the attack "will not deter the security forces, the armed forces and the honorable sons of the nation from carrying out their religious and patriotic duty in the face of terrorists wherever they may be." Yemeni ambassador to Canada Khaled Bahah said the attack "was aimed at abolishing the trust between the Yemeni people and the government.”

=== International ===
- Germany: German Foreign Minister Guido Westerwelle condemned the "cowardly attack" stated that "Yemen cannot become a refuge for terrorists." The German Foreign Ministry later announced that German citizens working for GIZ in Yemen had been asked to leave the country “as quickly as possible” and “until further notice”, while the German embassy in Sanaa would remain operational with reduced staff and “corresponding security measures.”
- Philippines: Philippines Department of Foreign Affairs spokesman Raul Hernandez condemned the attack and called on the Yemeni government to "bring the masterminds to justice and to take appropriate measures to ensure the safety of Filipinos and other foreigners in Yemen.” On 9 December, the Filipino government announced that it had banned its citizens from travelling to work in Yemen, and offered the 1,500 to 2,000 Filipinos already employed in the country the choice to return home at the government's expense. The Yemeni government vowed its support to facilitate the repatriation of the remains of the Filipino victims, with President Hadi stating that the victims were declared martyrs, "similar to the Yemeni victims.”
- Vietnam: Vietnamese Foreign Ministry spokesperson Luong Thanh Nghi extended condolences to the families of the victims and said the attackers "must be punished properly."
- United States: The U.S. military increased its regional alert status following the attack, with a senior defence official stating that they were "fully prepared to support our Yemeni partners." U.S. State Department deputy spokeswoman Marie Harf issued a statement condemning the attack and affirming that the U.S. would "remain firmly committed to supporting the Yemeni people."
- United Kingdom: British Foreign Secretary William Hague condemned the attack and offered condolences, while also advising British Nationals to leave Yemen. British Ambassador to Yemen Jane Marriott labeled the attack "a barbaric attempt to use terror and violence to prevent Yemenis from building a secure, prosperous and democratic future" in a blog post uploaded to the Foreign, Commonwealth and Development Office website on 14 December. Marriott drew a comparison to the Westgate shopping mall attack in Kenya months prior and described a "collective breath of horror" from viewers of the CCTV footage from the hospital. She emphasized the United Kingdom's support for Yemen in countering terrorism and to "build the future it deserves for its people."
- United Nations: United Nations Secretary-General Ban Ki-moon condemned the attack and said “the only path to a stable, prosperous and democratic Yemen is through the ongoing peaceful and all-inclusive National Dialogue Conference.” The Secretary-General's Special Envoy for Yemen Jamal Benomar said that "such criminal acts seeking to terrorize Yemenis will only strengthen their resolve to continue on their path of peaceful change." The UN Security Council also issued a statement which "expressed their deep sympathy and sincere condolences" to the victims and government of Yemen. The statement urged Security Council member states to cooperate with Yemeni authorities in order to bring the perpetrators, organizers, financiers and sponsors of such "reprehensible" acts to justice.

Additional statements of condolences were issued by the governments of Kuwait, Japan, Turkey and Russia, as well as by Saudi King Abdullah.

== Aftermath ==
The remains of many of the victims of the attack were handed over to their relatives on 6 December for burial.

On 12 December, several foreign embassies, companies and organisations across different parts the country, including in Sanaa, closed their doors after Yemeni authorities had informed them of possible terrorist attacks during the day. Among them included the UN office in Sanaa and the international American School. The same day, a Yemeni judge charged three Saudis with illegally entering the country to join AQAP. The group was arrested in Amran after travelling through the al-Buqa border crossing.

Additionally, the U.S. launched a drone strike on a car in Radda, al-Bayda governorate, targeting mid-level AQAP leader Shawqi Ali Ahmed al-Badani. U.S. officials reported killing nine to 12 militants in the airstrike. In contrast, Yemeni security officials said that the strike killed 13 civilians heading to a wedding party.

== See also ==
- Al-Qaeda insurgency in Yemen
- 2012 Unity Day parade rehearsal bombing
- 2013 Sanaa shootings
