= Al-Masajid, Sanaa =

Al-Masajid المساجد
- Village
- Location in Yemen
- Coordinates: 15.30975°N 44.07734°E
- Country: Yemen
- Governorate: Sanaa
- District: Bani Matar
- Elevation: 8,258 ft (2,517 m)
- Time zone: UTC+3 (Yemen Standard Time)

Al-Masajid (Arabic: المساجد al-Masājid) is a village in Bani Matar District of Sanaa Governorate, Yemen.

== History ==
The earliest known reference to al-Masajid is in 859 (245 AH), in the Ghayat al-amani of Yahya ibn al-Husayn, in connection with the destruction of the Rayʽan dam. The same work also records a battle taking place at al-Masajid in 1617 (1026 AH). It describes al-Masajid as a source of waters reaching the Wadi Zahr.
