= Dhahaban =

Dhahaban ذهبان
- Village
- Location in Yemen
- Coordinates: 15.42319°N 44.17673°E
- Country: Yemen
- Governorate: Amanat al-Asimah
- District: Bani al-Harith
- Elevation: 7,674 ft (2,339 m)
- Time zone: UTC+3 (Yemen Standard Time)

Dhahaban (Arabic: ذهبان Dhahabān), also Dhahban, is a town in Yemen, located on the outskirts of the capital Sanaa in Bani al-Harith District of Amanat al-Asimah Governorate. It is on the Sanaa plain, a bit south of the point where the Wadi Zahr opens out onto the plain. Before 2015, Dhahaban's power station was the main source of power in the Sanaa metro area, although the city's main supplier of electricity was the power plant in Ma'rib.

== Name and history ==
According to the 10th-century writer al-Hamdani, Dhahaban was named after Dhahabān b. Nawf Dhī Thaʽlabān b. Sharaḥbīl, of the tribe of Himyar. In 1989, Robert T.O. Wilson described Dhahaban as a small village and wrote that, while the name was vocalized as Dhahbān by al-Hamdani, as well as by the modern writers Muhammad al-Akwa and Hermann von Wissmann, "the pronunciation of this name is now closer to Dhahabān."

== Energy ==
Dhahaban's power station, located 10 km northwest of Sanaa, was supplied by power lines from the Ma'rib power plant. It is also capable of generating its own electricity, with an original capacity of 20 megawatts, with an additional 30 megawatts added in the 2000s.
