= Crowns from the Accounts of the Yemen and the Genealogies of Himyar =

History book by al-Hamdani (d. 940s)

Kitāb al-Iklīl
- Author: Abu Muhammad al-Hasan al-Hamdani
- Original title: Kitāb al-Iklīl min akhbār al-Yaman wa-ansāb Ḥimyar
- Language: Arabic (translated into German in 1881)
- Genre: History of Yemen
- Publisher: Various (see below)
- Publication place: Yemen

Crowns (Al-Ikīl, Arabic: كتاب الإكليل), fully known as the Crowns from the Accounts of the Yemen and the Genealogies of Himyar (Kitāb al-Iklīl min akhbār al-Yaman wa-ansāb Ḥimyar), is a ten-volume work on the pre-Islamic Arabian history of Yemen and the Himyarite Kingdom by the 10th-century grammarian, chemist and historian Abu Muhammad al-Hasan al-Hamdani. The eighth volume is known as the Antiquities of South Arabia.

The work celebrates South Arabian and Yemeni identity, in a time after the Abbasid Caliphate had withdrawn from the region and political turmoil was rife.

== Content ==
The work was originally written in ten volumes, only four of which exist to this day (vols. 1, 2, 8, 10), although a portion of the sixth volume was discovered and published in 2020.

The contents of the lost volumes were noted in other surviving works. The topics covered by the ten volumes are as follows:

- Volume 1: Genealogies of tribes of South Arabia
- Volume 2: Genealogies of tribes of South Arabia
  - Special focus on the family of king Sheba, the mythical Sabaean ancestor.
  - Contains the poem, al-Risala al-Damighah, sometimes separately published with commentary.
- Volume 3: Merits and deeds of people who lived in South Arabia
- Volumes 4–6: History of the Kingdom of Himyar, from its inception until the rise of Islam
- Volume 7: False reports on the history of South Arabia
- Volume 8: Monuments, burials and their inscriptions, and poetry from South Arabia
  - Discussions on the poetry of Dhu Jadan and Abu Karib.
- Volume 9: Proverbs and aphorisms from Himyar
- Volume 10: Genealogies of tribes of South Arabia
  - Focuses on the history of the people of Hamdan, the hometown of the author.

=== Discovery of volume 6 fragments ===
In 2020, a new manuscript was published and presented as preserving fragments of the lost sixth volume of Al-Iklil, thought to cover the period from late Himyarite history, from the time of the king Dhu Nuwas until the rise of Islam. However, one historian, Mounir Arbach, has suggested caution in receiving this news and analysis of the new manuscript suggests that its attribution to Al-Hamdani is overall uncertain. Only five folios are identified as possible Book 6 material, while the rest of the manuscript contains extracts from other works, including known material from the Book 10 and Al-Hamdani's other work, Sifat Jazirat al-Arab. The fragment discusses Dhu Nuwas, the People of the Trench, and Sayf b. Dhi Yazan, topics that fit the expected subject of Book 6 but were also widely discussed by other Islamic authors. The document also lacks several of Al-Hamdani's usual sources.

== Description of pre-Islamic Yemen ==
=== Genelaogy ===
The genealogy of Al-Iklil has been interpreted as political, produced in a time where Yemen was in conflict with external religious and political movements, including Zaydi and Isma'ili groups from the north. The surviving genealogical volumes of the work present the tribes of Yemen as part of the Qahtanite, or South Arabian, lineage and respond to earlier north genealogical traditions that Al-Hamdani believed minimized the antiquity and importance of the southern tribes.

Al-Hamdani makes prominent the Banu Hamdan, which he was a member of, while also relating material about other tribes such as Himyar, Khawlan, Quda'a, and Madhhij. The presentation of the Madhhij tribe is selective. It is placed into a South Arabian genealogy, but its descendants receive less detail compared to other groups and other narratives depict the Madhhij as being in conflict with more well-established South Arabian lineages. Some historians have read this depiction as the product of a milieu where descent, historical memory, and contemporary debates about legitimacy all came together.

=== Inscriptions ===
Christian J. Robin argues that al-Hamdani used ancient South Arabian inscriptions in Al-Iklil to support and expand Yemeni genealogies, especially those of Himyar and Hamdan. Some of the inscriptions cited appear to be real, though often misunderstood due to Al-Hamdani's difficulties in reading ancient Sabaic grammar. Other inscriptions cited are literary inventions or not genuinely pre-Islamic. Al-Hamdani cited inscriptions to counter the views of earlier northern genealogists had he accused of falsely shortening the lineages of South Arabian tribes to diminish Yemen's antiquity and prestige. In response, Al-Hamdani drew on family traditions, poetry, place names, ruins, and names found in inscriptions to reconstruct a deeper South Arabian past. Al-Hamdani was often able to identify names in inscriptions but frequently misread letters, misunderstood Sabaic grammar, and inserted damaged or misread names into genealogical narratives. Accordingly, Al-Iklil is not a straightforward record of the past but it does succeed in demonstrating how tenth-century Yemeni scholars used fragments of antiquity to construct a prestigious South Arabian historical memory.

=== Tribes ===
==== Hashid and Bakil tribes ====
Al-Hamdani presents Banu Hamdan as divided between the Hashid and Bakil groups, with Hashid being simplistically placed in the west and Bakil in the east. A more complex picture of the geography of the two groups is found in Book 10 of Al-Iklil and in Al-Hamdani's Sifat Jazirat al-Arab, where the territories are overlapping with some group's enclaves belonging in the other's territory. Bakil appears strongly in the Bawn and in eastern regions such as al-Jawf, while Hashid is associated with parts of the northern highlands and western mountain areas. The evidence suggests that the contemporary tribal order of these groups had, in part, already formed in pre-Islamic times, with the tribal structure of the two groups having been reinterpreted through later Islamic genealogical frameworks.

==== Khawlan tribe ====
Al-Hamdani's accounts describe Khawlan, an ancient Yemeni tribe, as forming not through a descent from one ancestor but through the formation of a federation under the pressure of migrations, alliances, settlements and violent conflict. In Al-Hamdani's Al-Ikhlil, as well as in his Sifat Jazirat al-Arab, Khawlan's origins are connected to the movement of a Sa'd b. Khawlan who originated in the city of Marib before moving to Sirwah after the collapse of the Marib Dam. After his migration, one of his descendants, Hujr b. Rabi'a, is said to have migrated from Sirwah to the region of Sa'dah. There, in Sa'dah, Hujr formed an alliance with the Banu Shihab. According to Al-Hamdani, Banu Shihab settled either in the plains of Sa'dah or in a nearby and mountainous location. A rival account preserved by Al-Hamdani suggests that the Sa'dah plains previously belonged to Banu Hamdan, but came to belong to Banu Shihab through conflict and battle. Ultimately, Khawlan's collective identity is understood in the text as having emerged slowly through warfare, as different groups came to be unified under the banner of the Khawlan, rather than just by descent.

==== Shākir tribe ====
One of the tribes whose structure, geography, and identity discussed in Al-Iklil is the Shākir tribe. Shakir is considered a South Arabian tribe of the Bakil branch of Banu Hamdan, mainly in al-Jawf and the surrounding regions between Jabal Barat and Najran. The tenth volume of Al-Iklil divides Shakir into the Duhmah, Wa'ilah, Amir, al-Harith, and Yashkur. The people of Duhmah are highlighted for their tribal chivalry: bravery, nobility, strength, etc. Al-Hamdani also talks about conflicts between Duhmah and its sister tribe, Wa'ilah, including cycles of vengeance between them that lead to the deaths of hundreds of people. The structure of the genealogy of Shakir given by Al-Hamdani reflects that it was not a single and static group over time, but that it also absorbed immigrant and allied groups.

=== Technology ===
Passages in Al-Iklil describes mechanical devices with hydraulic and pneumatic functions used in association with Ghumdan Palace in the city of Sanaa. These include hollow copper lions that Al-Hamdani says would roar when wind passed through them and a "clepsydra", or a water clock. These devices may be compared to traditions of devices known from Greek and later Islamic sources, although connections with finds from Yemeni archaeology are still speculative.

== In scholarship ==
Of the ten volumes of Kitāb al-Iklīl published in the 10th century, only the first, second, eighth and tenth volumes survived intact to the present day.

In 1881, parts of the work were translated into German by David Heinrich Müller.

The historian Nabih Amin Faris compiled the four surviving volumes into an annotated work, al-Juz' al-Thamin, published in 1940 by Princeton University Press as part of the Princeton Oriental Texts collection.

An abridged version of the texts has been made available under a Creative Commons license for reading in some online libraries.

== English translations ==
No complete English translation has been made of the work, and the following only translate parts of it.

- Faris, Nabih A. (Trans.) – The Antiquities of South Arabia (Kitāb al-Iklīl, X). Princeton, 1938.
- Müller, David Heinrich (Trans.) – Die Bürgen und Schlösser Südarabiens, Vols. 1–2 (Kitāb al-Iklīl, VIII). Vienna, 1879.
- Müller, David Heinrich (Trans.) – Ṣifa: al-Hamdânî’s Geographie der arabischen Halbinsel (ṣifat ǧazīrat al-ʿarab). Leiden, 1884-1891.
- Toll, Christopher (Trans.) – Die Beide Edelmetallen Gold und Silber (Kitāb al-jawharatayn al-ʿatīqatayn). Uppsala, 1968.

== See also ==
- The Book of Crowns on the Kings of Himyar by Ibn Hisham
- History of the Prophets and Kings by Al-Tabari
- History of al-Ya'qubi

== Sources ==
- Arbach, Mounir (2020). "Muqbil al‑Aḥmadī. Le sixième tome d'al‑Iklīl d'Abū al‑Ḥasan al‑Hamdānī". Arabian Humanities.
- Brandt, Marieke (2016). "Heroic History, Disruptive Genealogy: al-Ḥasan al-Hamdānī and the Historical Formation of the Shākir Tribe (Wāʿilah and Dahm) in al-Jawf, Yemen". Medieval Worlds. 3: 116–145.
- Filson, Lily (2020). "Hydraulic and Pneumatic Devices in Pre-Islamic Yemen". Ancient West & East. 19: 269–283.
- Heiss, Johann (2018). "Migrations and Federations: The Origins of the Tribal Federation of Khawlān According to al-Hamdānī". The Medieval History Journal. 21 (2): 365–379.
- Mahoney, Daniel (2016). "The Political Construction of a Tribal Genealogy from Early Medieval South Arabia". In Hovden, Eirik; Lutter, Christina; Pohl, Walter (eds.). Meanings of Community across Medieval Eurasia: Comparative Approaches. Brill. pp. 163–182.
- Mahoney, Daniel (2021). "The Formation of South Arabian Identity in al-Iklīl of al-Hamdānī". In Pohl, Walter; Mahoney, Daniel (eds.). Historiography and Identity IV: Writing History across Medieval Eurasia. Brepols. pp. 137–156.
- Robin, Christian Julien (2021). "Le déchiffrement et l'utilisation des inscriptions antiques par le traditionniste yéménite al Ḥasan al Hamdānī". Jerusalem Studies in Arabic and Islam. 51: 27–132.
- Wilson, Robert (1981). "Al-Hamdānī's Description of Ḥāshid and Bakīl". Proceedings of the Seminar for Arabian Studies: 95–104.
