= Baynun fortress =

Ancient fortress in Yemen

Baynun fortress was an ancient fortress in Yemen, not far from Sana'a. The geographical dictionary of Yaqut reports that it was a large fortress near San'a' that had been built by Solomon along with Salhin. The ruins of the fortress are on top of a mountain, an ancient site referred to by some as an-Nasla meaning "the dagger of jambiyya". Two sets of ruins of ancient towns exist in the area which were known as ad-Dakhala and Minara. It was a Himyarite stronghold and al-Hamdani reported that King As'ad Tubba' used the fortress as his residence for some time; legend has it that an older Sabaean fortification of Baynun had been constructed for the Queen of Sheba and had been given to her by Solomon. Yaqut claimed it was destroyed during the Abyssinian conquest by the Aksumites in the 6th century, specifically the year 525 in order to overthrow Dhu Nuwas. The poet Dhu Jadan al-Himyari wrote about the destruction of Baynun.

== See also ==
- List of castles in Yemen
