= Old City of Sanaa =

Old City of Sanaa صنعاء القديمة Ṣanʿāʾ al-Qadīmah
- District
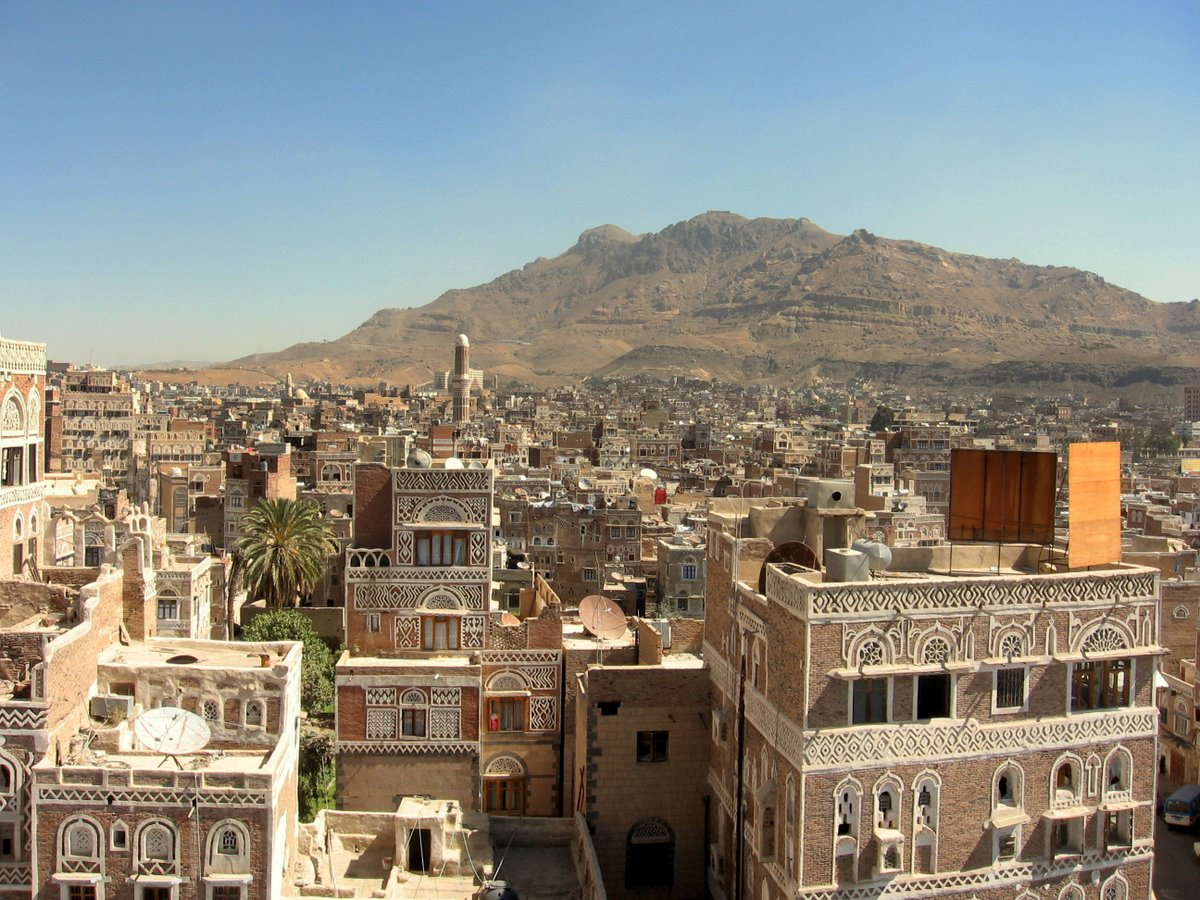
- Interactive map of Old City of Sanaa
- Coordinates: 15°21′20″N 44°12′29″E
- Country: Yemen
- Municipality: Amanat Al Asimah
- Elevation: 5 m (16 ft)

Population (2003)
  - Total: 63,398
- Time zone: UTC+3 (Yemen Standard Time)

UNESCO World Heritage Site
- Official name: Old City of Sana'a
- Type: Cultural
- Criteria: Cultural: (iv)(v)(vi)
- Designated: 1986 (10th session)
- Reference no.: 385
- Region: Arab States

The Old City of Sanaʽa (Note: Arabic: مَدِيْنَة صَنْعَاء ٱلْقَدِيْمَة, romanized: Madīnat Ṣanʿāʾ Al-Qadīmah) (Note: officially the Old City District (Arabic: مديرية صنعاء القديمة Mudayrīyat Ṣanʿāʾ al-Qadīmah)) is a recognised UNESCO World Heritage Site in the Amanat Al Asimah Governorate, Yemen. As of 2003, the district had a population of 63,398 inhabitants. The old fortified city has been inhabited for more than 2,500 years and contains many intact architectural sites. The oldest, partially standing architectural structure in the Old City of Sanaʽa is Ghumdan Palace. The city was declared a World Heritage Site by the United Nations in 1986. Efforts are underway to preserve some of the oldest buildings some of which, such as the Samsarh and the Great Mosque of Sanaʽa, is more than 1,400 years old. Surrounded by ancient clay walls that stand 9–14 metres (30–46 ft) high, the Old City contains more than 100 mosques, 12 hammams (baths), and 6,500 houses. Many of the houses resemble ancient skyscrapers, reaching several stories high and topped with flat roofs. They are decorated with elaborate friezes and intricately carved frames and stained-glass windows.

British writer Jonathan Raban visited in the 1970s and described the city as "fortress-like, its architecture and layout resembling a labyrinth", further noting "It was like stepping out into the middle of a vast pop-up picture book. Away from the street, the whole city turned into a maze of another kind, a dense, jumbled alphabet of signs and symbols."

One of the most popular attractions is Suq al-Milh (Salt Market), where it is possible to buy salt along with bread, spices, raisins, cotton, copper, pottery, silverware, and antiques. The 7th-century Jāmiʿ al-Kabīr (the Great Mosque) is one of the oldest mosques in the world. The Bāb al-Yaman ("Gate of the Yemen") is an iconized entry point through the city walls and is more than 1,000 years old.

A commercial area of the Old City is known as Al Madina where development is proceeding rapidly. In addition to three large hotels, there are numerous stores and restaurants. The area also contains three parks.

Traditionally, the Old City was composed of several quarters (hara), generally centred on an endowed complex containing a mosque, a bathhouse, and an agricultural garden (maqshama). Human waste from households was disposed of via chutes. In the mountain air, it dried fairly quickly and was then used as fuel for the bathhouse. Meanwhile, the gardens were watered using gray water from the mosque's ablution pool.

One of these quarters was Qa' al-Yahud, or the Jewish Quarter, located on the Western side of the old city. It had a distinct architecture that was defined by buildings with larger floor plans, houses which had the main socializing room elevated to the top of the house, and tended to be shorter than the standard houses of the city.
