= Raba' Hamdan =

Raba' Hamdan ربع همدان
- Sub-district
- Location in Yemen
- Coordinates: 15°25′59″N 44°03′49″E
- Country: Yemen
- Governorate: Sana'a
- District: Hamdan

Population (2004)
  - Total: 29,032
- Time zone: UTC+3

Raba' Hamdan (Arabic: ربع همدان) is a sub-district located in Hamdan District, Sana'a Governorate, Yemen. Raba' Hamdan had a population of 29032 according to the 2004 census.
