= Bani Makram =

Bani Makram بني مكرم
- Sub-district
- Location in Yemen
- Coordinates: 15°32′56″N 44°03′57″E
- Country: Yemen
- Governorate: Sana'a
- District: Hamdan

Population (2004)
  - Total: 12,473
- Time zone: UTC+3

Bani Makram (Arabic: بني مكرم) is a sub-district located in Hamdan District, Sana'a Governorate, Yemen. Bani Makram had a population of 12473 according to the 2004 census.
