= Khalaqah =

Khalaqah خلقة
- Village
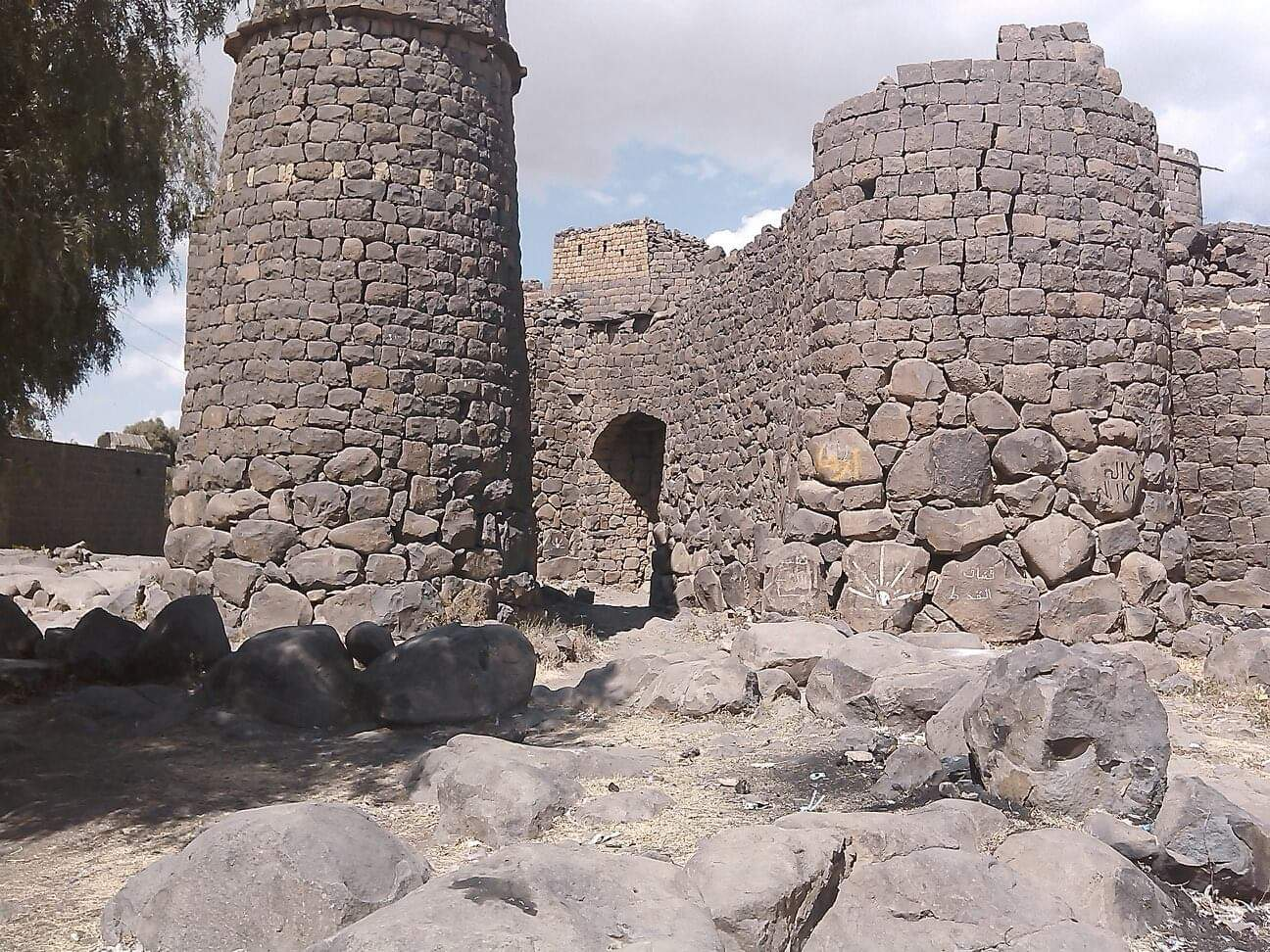
- Khalaqah village gatehouse

- Location in Yemen
- Coordinates: 15.50208°N 43.93413°E
- Country: Yemen
- Governorate: Sanaa
- District: Hamdan
- Elevation: 8,406 ft (2,562 m)
- Time zone: UTC+3 (Yemen Standard Time)

Khalaqah (Arabic: خلقة Khalaqah) is a village and corresponding 'uzlah in Hamdan District of Sanaa Governorate, Yemen. The 10th-century writer al-Hamdani mentioned it in his Sifat Jazirat al-Arab, but it is absent from most other medieval and early modern historical sources.
