= Qaratil =

Qaratil قراتيل
- Village
- Location in Yemen
- Coordinates: 15.42498°N 44.05098°E
- Country: Yemen
- Governorate: Sanaa
- District: Hamdan
- Elevation: 8,599 ft (2,621 m)
- Time zone: UTC+3 (Yemen Standard Time)

Qaratil (Arabic: قراتيل Qarātīl) is a village in Hamdan District of Sanaa Governorate, Yemen. It is located a bit to the south of the road between Sanaa and Shibam Kawkaban.

== History ==
The earliest known historical mention of Qaratil is in the Ghayat al-amani of Yahya ibn al-Husayn, in connection with the events of the year 1056 (448 AH)
