= Wada'ah =

Wada'ah وادعة
- Sub-district
- Location in Yemen
- Country: Yemen
- Governorate: Sana'a
- District: Hamdan

Population (2004)
  - Total: 32,204
- Time zone: UTC+3

Wada'ah (Arabic: وادعة) is a sub-district located in Hamdan District, Sana'a Governorate, Yemen. Wada'ah had a population of 32204 according to the 2004 census.
