= Jashm =

Jashm جشم
- Sub-district
- Location in Yemen
- Coordinates: 15.53874°N 43.96643°E
- Country: Yemen
- Governorate: Sana'a
- District: Hamdan

Population (2004)
  - Total: 11,612
- Time zone: UTC+3

Jashm (Arabic: جشم) is a sub-district located in Hamdan District, Sana'a Governorate, Yemen. Jashm had a population of 11,612 according to the 2004 census.
