= Madam, Yemen =

Madam مدام
- Village
- Location in Yemen
- Coordinates: 15.4916°N 44.12392°E
- Country: Yemen
- Governorate: Sanaa
- District: Hamdan
- Elevation: 7,467 ft (2,276 m)
- Time zone: UTC+3 (Yemen Standard Time)

Madam (Arabic: مدام Madām) is a village in Hamdan District of Sanaa Governorate, Yemen.

== History ==
Madam is mentioned by the 10th-century writer Abu Muhammad al-Hasan al-Hamdani in his Sifat Jazirat al-Arab, in a section about places mentioned in Arabic poetry. He describes it as a place in Hamdan, but does not quote any corresponding verses. The 13th-century writer Yaqut al-Hamawi also mentions Madam.
