= Bab al Yemen =

Popular gate in Sanaa's Old City

Coordinates: 15.3512°N 44.2159°E

Bab al-Yaman
- بَاب ٱلْيَمَن
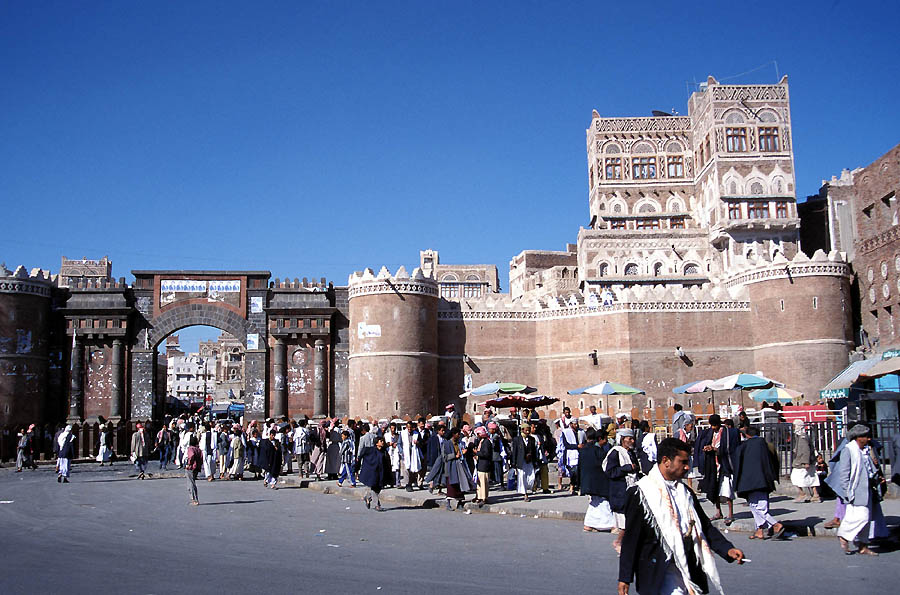
- The 1,000-year-old Yemen Gate in Sana'a

General information
- Architectural style: Yemenite
- Town or city: Old City of Sanaa
- Country: Yemen

Bab al-Yaman (Arabic: باب اليمن, romanized: Bâb al-Yaman, lit. 'Gate of Yemen') is the main gate of Old Sanaa's old fortified wall, on the southern extremity of the walled city. German geographer Carl Rathjens dated its current appearance to the 17th century and attributed the initial design of the gate to the biblical Shem, the son of Noah. Today, it is the most ornate of the gates of Sana's Old City. Passengers travelling southward, en route to Ma'bar and Dhamar, would depart from this gate.

== Description ==
As one enters the gate, one quickly notices the Yemeni architecture, high towering houses made of baked bricks decorated and waterproofed with lime plaster and qadad, one of the characteristic features of Sana's Old City. Many of the houses make use of decorative windows, designed as fanlights fitted with stained glass, enclosed within muntins of gypsum plaster and lime-coated sash. Windows that are typical of the Old City of Sana'a are the alabaster qamariyyah, and the stained glass fanlight (‘aqd mulawwan). The Great Mosque of Sana'a is located about 300 yards from the Yemen Gate. The old city of Sana'a is listed as a UNESCO World Heritage Site due to its unique architectural characteristics, most notably expressed in its multi-storey buildings decorated with geometric patterns.

The brass rings on the left and right columns at the entrance of the Yemen Gate were made by Jewish artisans during the period of the monarchy under the Imams.

Opposite Bab al-Yaman to the north of the Old City is Bab es-Sha'ub.

== Gallery ==
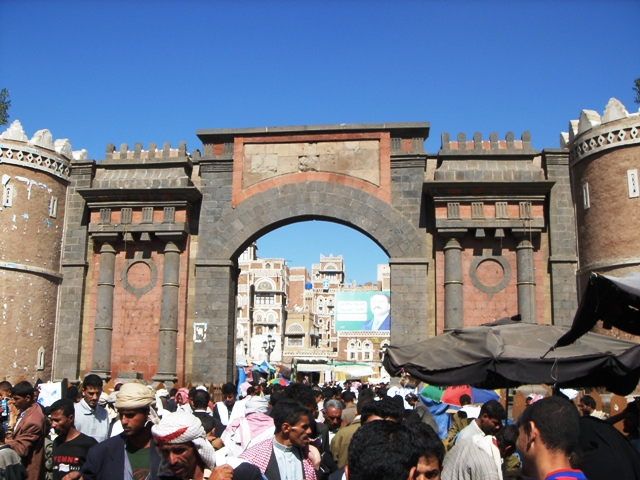

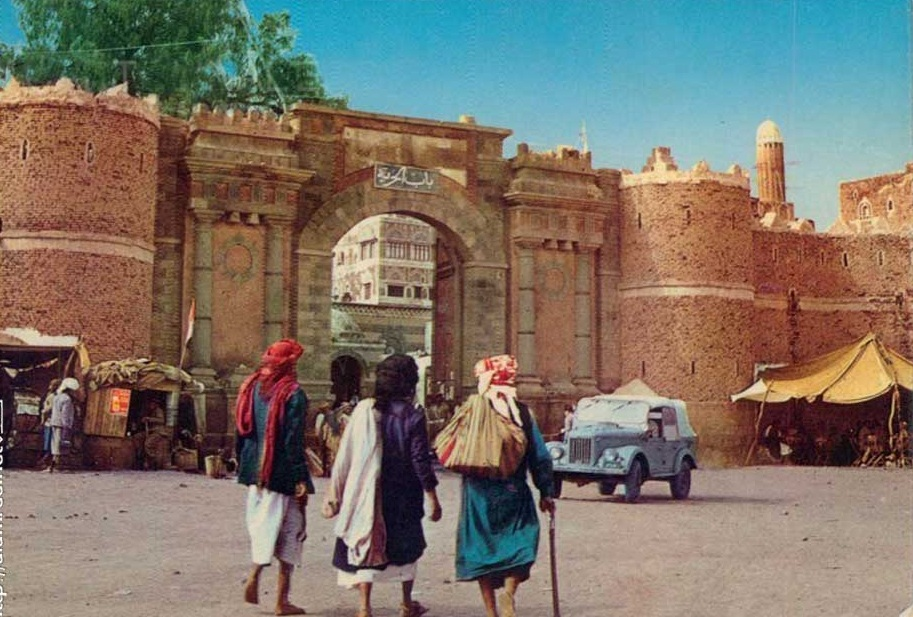

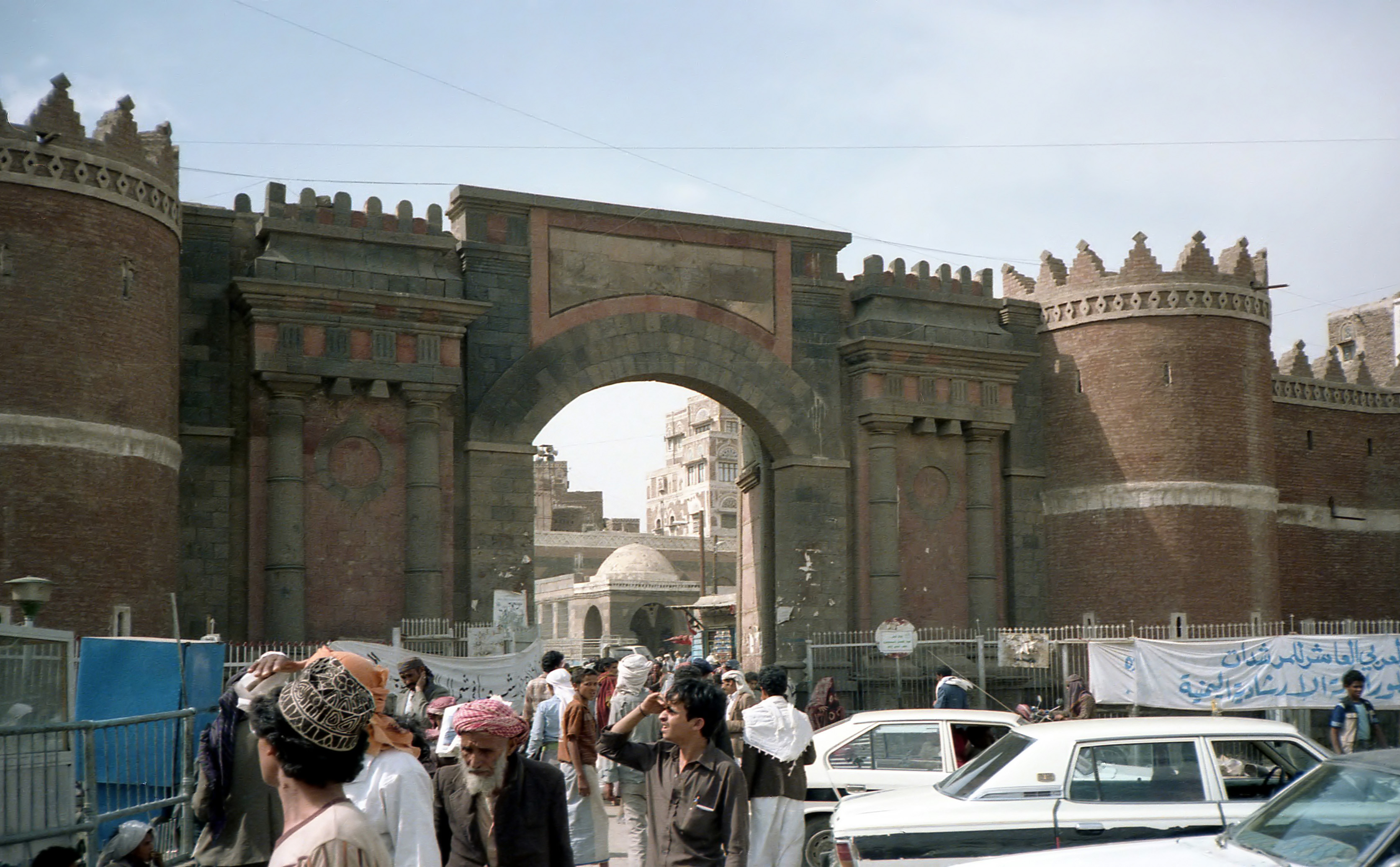

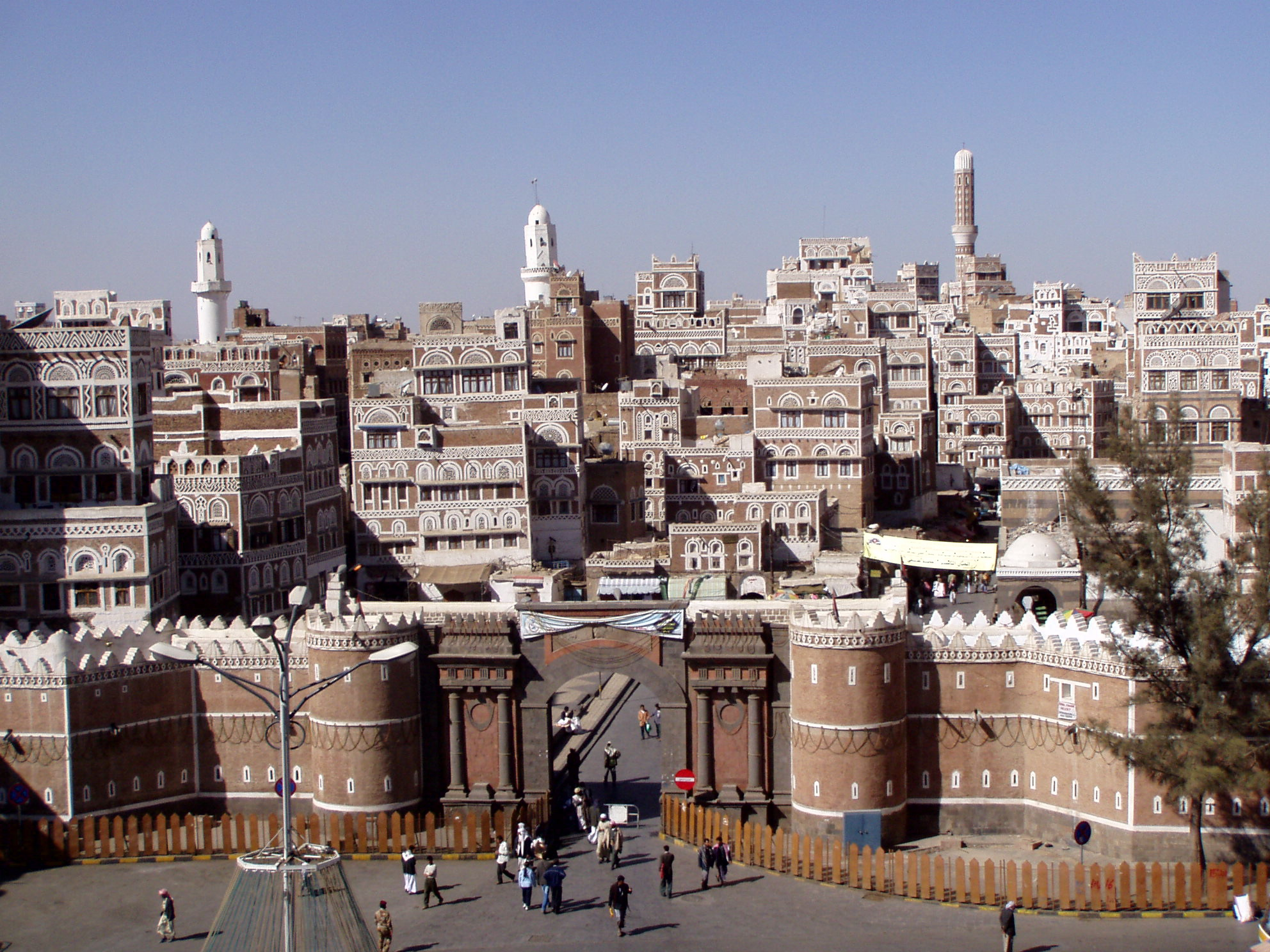

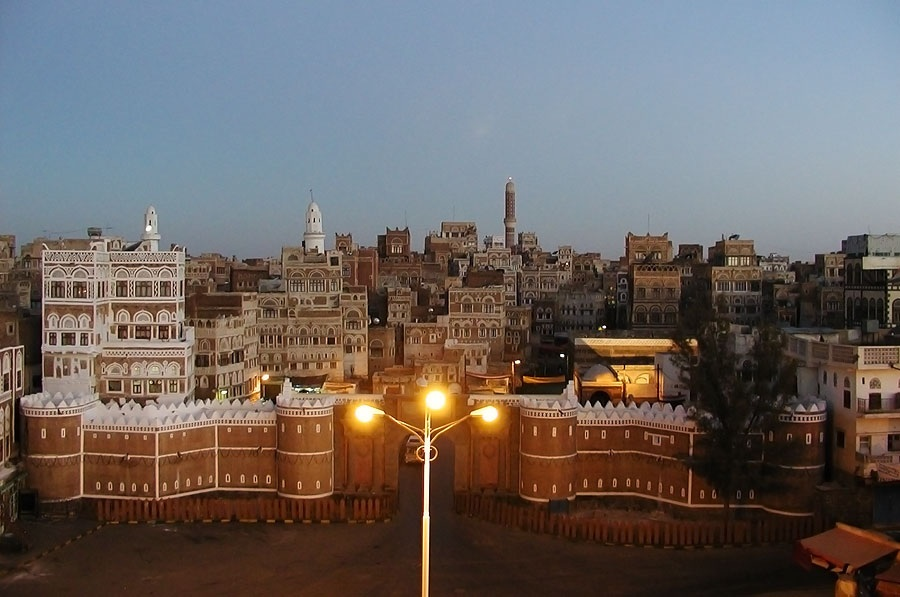

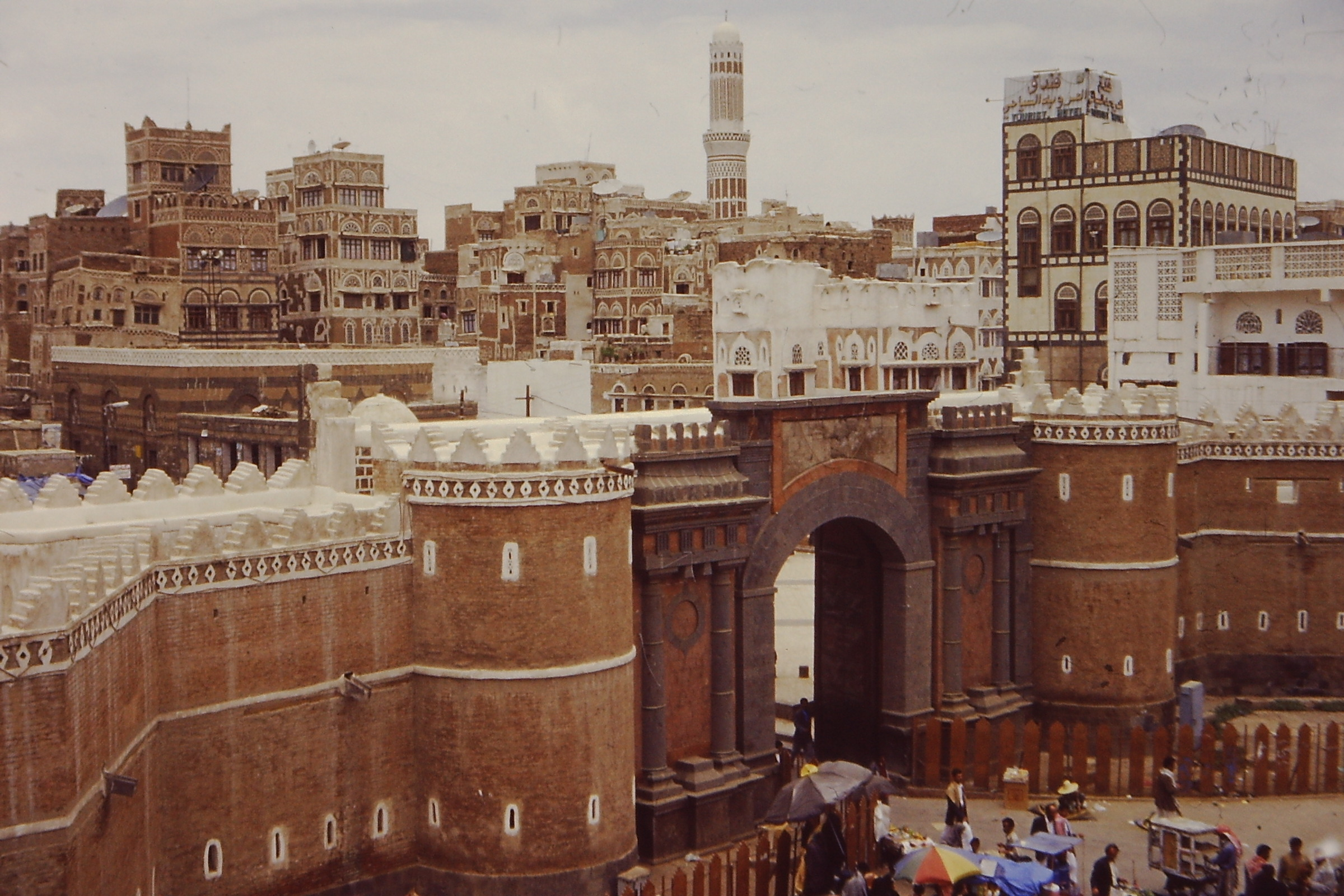
