= Lord's (restaurant) =

Restaurant in New York City, U.S.

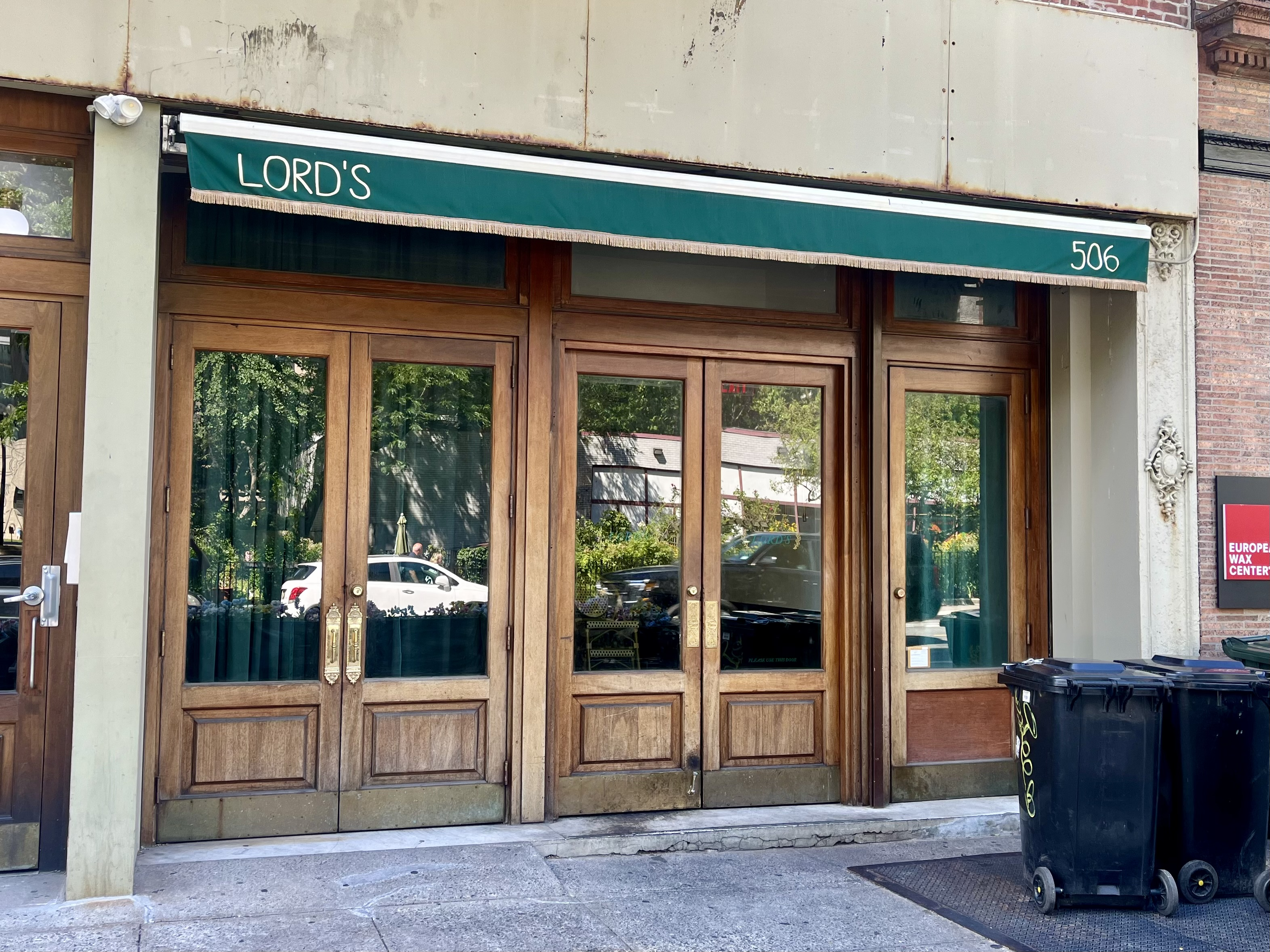
- The restaurant's exterior in 2024
- Interactive map of Lord's

Restaurant information
- Established: October 3, 2022
- Location: 506 LaGuardia Place, New York City, New York, 10012, United States
- Coordinates: 40°43′40″N 73°59′58″W

Lord's is a British restaurant in New York City. It was named one of twelve best new restaurants in the United States by Eater in 2023.

The restaurant is located near Dame, a restaurant established by the same group that runs Lord's.

== See also ==
- List of British restaurants
