= 2013 Sanaa shootings =

2013 militant attack in Yemen

- Part of Yemeni crisis (2011–present)
- Location: Sanaa, Yemen
- Date: 26 November 2013
- Attack type: shooting
- Deaths: 3 (1 died in hospital)
- Injuries: 1 (died in hospital)
- Perpetrator: Al-Qaeda in the Arabian Peninsula

On November 26, 2013, unidentified persons carried out two attacks in Sanaa, Yemen. The victims of the attacks were two Belarusian military specialists and a Yemeni policeman.

== Background ==
In the early 2010s, the Yemeni government, led by the nationalist General People's Congress Party, which was predominantly Sunni, waged an armed struggle against the Shiite Houthi movement. The third force in the conflict were the south Yemeni separatists and Islamist groups.

At least two Belarusians were sent in 2013 to support the Yemeni security forces. According to the official statement of the Belarusian government, they worked in the protection of the president. According to military analyst Alexander Alesin, the main task was to assist in the maintenance of T-80BV tanks purchased by Yemen in Belarus in 2010. These vehicles were repeatedly used during the fighting.

== Attacks ==
At 9:15 a.m. on November 26, 2013, when leaving the Amsterdam Hotel in the center of Sanaa, Belarusians came under fire from militants who drove up to the building on a motorcycle. The militants were armed with a pistol or a machine gun with a silencer. One of the foreigners, an employee of the 140th repair plant Anatoly Mazynsky from Barysaw, died on the spot, and the second, whose identity is unknown, was seriously injured. Two hours after the attack, motorcyclists (presumably the same ones who shot at the hotel) killed police officer Ahmed al-Jaadari on Khovlian Street. On November 27, it became known that the second Belarusian victim died of wounds in the hospital.

== Reaction ==
Initially, the media reported that the victims of the attack at the hotel were Russians. However, the press attache of the Russian embassy in Yemen, Nikolai Lyagushin, called the victims Belarusians, refuting the information about Russian citizens. According to him, they worked in the country under a private contract, and the diplomatic mission provided all the necessary assistance to the victims. The representative of the Yemeni Foreign Ministry, colonel Mohammed al-Mauri, said that foreigners are military specialists. According to Maria Vanshina, deputy head of the Information Department of the Belarusian Foreign Ministry, the Belarusian side has started checking this information. Soon, the official representative of the Ministry of Foreign Affairs Andrei Savinykh and the head of the State Military Industry Sergei Gurulev confirmed that the victims were Belarusians.

== Attackers ==
No terrorist group has claimed responsibility for the attack. Yemeni media speculated that the attack was a retaliatory action by Al-Qaeda. Two days earlier, government aircraft destroyed 12 members of the terrorist network.

== See also ==
- Al-Qaeda insurgency in Yemen
- 2013 Yemeni Ministry of Defense attack
