= Citadel of Rada'a =

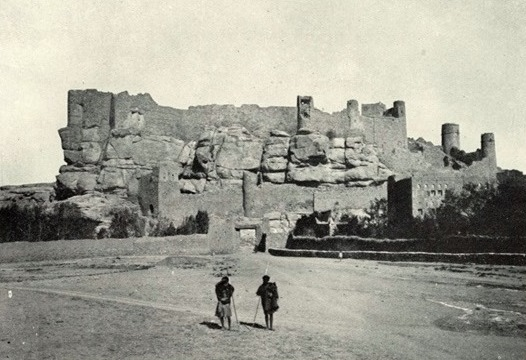
- Citadel of Rada'a, seen in the back

- Location within Yemen

General information
- Location: Rada'a District, Yemen
- Coordinates: 14°25′10″N 44°50′28″E

The Citadel of Rada'a (Arabic: قلعة رداع) is a historic castle in Yemen, located in the center of Rada'a District. The citadel sits at the highest point of the district, and consisted the original part of the city of Rada'a. The construction of the citadel precedes the introduction of Islam and dates back to the year 243 during the reign of Shammar Yahri'sh, the Himyarite king. Specifically, the upper part of the citadel dates back to the Himyarite era. Later the citadel was restored and renovated during the time of Omar bin Abdulwahhab of the Tahirids dynasty. During this time, the other parts of the citadel were added, and the construction was ended during the time of Imam Yahya, who used the castle as a prison for the rebels. Its status as a prison lasted until the 1990s.

In September 2012, the western part of the citadel collapsed due to the rainwater and the lack of proper maintenance and restoration.

== See also ==
- List of castles in Yemen
