= Madam (disambiguation) =

Madam is a respectful title for a woman (often "ma'am" or "madame").

Madam may also refer to:

- MADAM, a drug
- MADAM-6, a psychoactive drug
- Madam (fashion), a Japanese fashion style
- Madam (band), an English rock band
- Madam (prostitution), a term for a woman who is engaged in the business of procuring prostitutes, usually the manager of a brothel
- Madam (film), a 1994 Telugu comedy film
- Madam, Yemen
- Al Madam, an inland town of Sharjah, UAE

== See also ==
- Madame (disambiguation)
