= Madame =

Madame may refer to:

- Madam, civility title or form of address for women, derived from the French madame
- Madame (1961 film), a Spanish-Italian-French film
- Madame (2017 film), a French comedy-drama film
- Madame, a German fashion magazine
- Madame (singer) (born 2002), Italian singer and rapper
- Madame, a puppet made famous by entertainer Wayland Flowers
- Madame (clothing), an Indian clothing company

== Places ==
- Île Madame, French island on the Atlantic coast
- Palazzo Madama, seat of the Senate of the Italian Republic in Rome
- Palazzo Madama, Turin, Italian palace

== See also ==
- Madam (disambiguation)
