= Jirban =

- Village
- Location in Yemen
- Coordinates: 15.58319°N 44.0663°E
- Country: Yemen
- Governorate: Sanaa
- District: Hamdan
- Elevation: 8,474 ft (2,583 m)
- Time zone: UTC+3 (Yemen Standard Time)

Jirban (Jirbān) is a village in Hamdan District of Sanaa Governorate, Yemen. It is located on a small promontory at the foot of Jabal Din, just to the north of the road from Sanaa to 'Amran.

== History ==
Jirban is first mentioned in historical sources in 1302 (701 AH), in the Ghayat al-amani of Yahya ibn al-Husayn. It historically was the site of a minor fort.
