= Al-Munaqqab =

Al-Munaqqab المنقب
- Village
- Location in Yemen
- Coordinates: 15.47712°N 44.01735°E
- Country: Yemen
- Governorate: Sanaa
- District: Hamdan
- Elevation: 8,638 ft (2,633 m)
- Time zone: UTC+3 (Yemen Standard Time)

Al-Munaqqab (Arabic: المنقب al-Munaqqab) is a village in Hamdan District of Sanaa Governorate, Yemen. It lies to the north of the road between Sanaa and Shibam Kawkaban, and is built on a small hill of porous volcanic rock, with some houses being built directly into the hillside. It was the site of a minor fortress during the late medieval and early modern period, and is first mentioned in historical records in 683 AH (1284 CE).
