= Hajar Saʽid =

Hajar Saʽid حجر سعيد
- Village
- Location in Yemen
- Coordinates: 15.49631°N 43.9566°E
- Country: Yemen
- Governorate: Sanaa
- District: Hamdan
- Elevation: 8,307 ft (2,532 m)
- Time zone: UTC+3 (Yemen Standard Time)

Hajar Saʽid (Arabic: حجر سعيد Ḥajar Sa‘īd) is a small village in Hamdan District of Sanaa Governorate, Yemen. It is located by the road from Sanaa to Shibam Kawkaban.

== History ==
Hajar Saʽid is first mentioned in the Ghayat al-amani of Yahya ibn al-Husayn, in connection with the events 904 AH (1499 CE). At that time, it marked the westernmost extent of the territory of the Isma'ilis of the Hamdan tribe.
