= Dames (surname) =

Dames is a surname. Notable people with the surname include:

- Danie Dames (born 1986), Namibian rugby union player
- George Dames (1936 or 1937–2024), American politician in Missouri
- Marvin Dames, Bahamian politician
- Rob Dames (born 1944), American writer, director and producer
- Romi Dames (born 1979), American actress
- Rory Dames, American soccer coach
- Wilhelm Dames (1843–1898), German palaeontologist

== See also ==
- Dame (surname)
