= American School (Yemen) =

Location
- Sana'a, Yemen
- Coordinates: 15.3224°N 44.1973°E

Information
- School type: Independent school
- Founded: 1995
- Grades: P-12
- Gender: Co-Educational
- Education system: American Curriculum
- Language: English

American School is an American international school in Sana'a, Yemen. It serves pre-school through grade 12. It was established in 1995, making it the first English medium school accredited by Yemeni authorities.
