= List of castles in Yemen =

This is a list of castles in Yemen.

Name	Location	Picture
Baynun fortress	Sana'a	
Ghumdan Palace	Sana'a	
Aljabowbi Castle	Sana'a	
Al-Qahira Castle	Taiz	
Citadel of Rada'a	Rada'a District	
Al-Qashla Fortress	Sana'a	
