= Ghumdan Palace =

Historical site in the Old City of Sana'a

- Location within Yemen

General information
- Architectural style: Architecture
- Location: Sana'a, Yemen
- Coordinates: 15.353115°N 44.214722°E
- Completed: Mid third century AD (?)

Ghumdan Palace, also Qasir Ghumdan or Ghamdan Palace, is an ancient fortified palace in Sana'a, Yemen, going back to the ancient Kingdom of Saba. All that remains of the ancient site (Ar. khadd) of Ghumdan is a field of tangled ruins opposite the first and second of the eastern doors of the Jami‘ Al Kabeer Mosque (Great Mosque of Sana'a). This part of Sana'a forms an eminence which is known to contain the debris of ancient times. The place is located on the extreme southeastern end of Sanaa's old walled city, al-Qaṣr, just west of where the Great Mosque of Sana'a was later built, and is part of the UNESCO World Heritage Site of the Old City of Sana'a. It is sometimes referred to as Ghumdan Tower.

According to Arab geographer and historian, Al-Hamdani (c. 893-945), the foundation stones of Ghumdan Palace were laid by Shem, the son of Noah, and finished by the Sabaean monarch Ilī-Sharḥa Yaḥḍib (ca. 8th century BCE), the father of Bilqis. Others say that it was built by Sha'r Awtar who walled the city of Sana'a, while yet others suggest that it may date to pre-Islamic times, constructed by the Sabaeans during the reign of the last great Sabaean King El Sharih Yahdhib (ca. 60-20 BCE). Some historians date it to the beginning of the 2nd century or the 1st century. The palace was destroyed by Caliph Uthman, or even earlier, by Kaleb. Restored several times, the palace history is represented in numerous legends and tales. It is mentioned in many pieces of Arabic poetry, the poets singing about its beauty. Ghumdan Palace tower, a 20-storey high-rise building, is believed by some to have been the world's earliest skyscraper.

== History ==
Though the former palace is now in ruins, its style, a towered, multi-floor structure, has provided the prototype for the tower-type houses built in Sana’a. It expressed the "exquisite architecture of the old city".

The palace was used by the last Himyarite kings, who had ruled Yemen from Ghumdan and was once the residence of Abhalah. It was reportedly destroyed by Caliph Uthman in the 7th century because he feared it could be used as a stronghold for a rebellion. Some of its materials were re-used to build the Great Mosque.

The palace was reconstructed some time later but deteriorated over time. The ruins of the palace tower are now in the form of a mound that extends from the east of the Great Mosque to the north of Bab Al-Yemen.

== Architecture ==
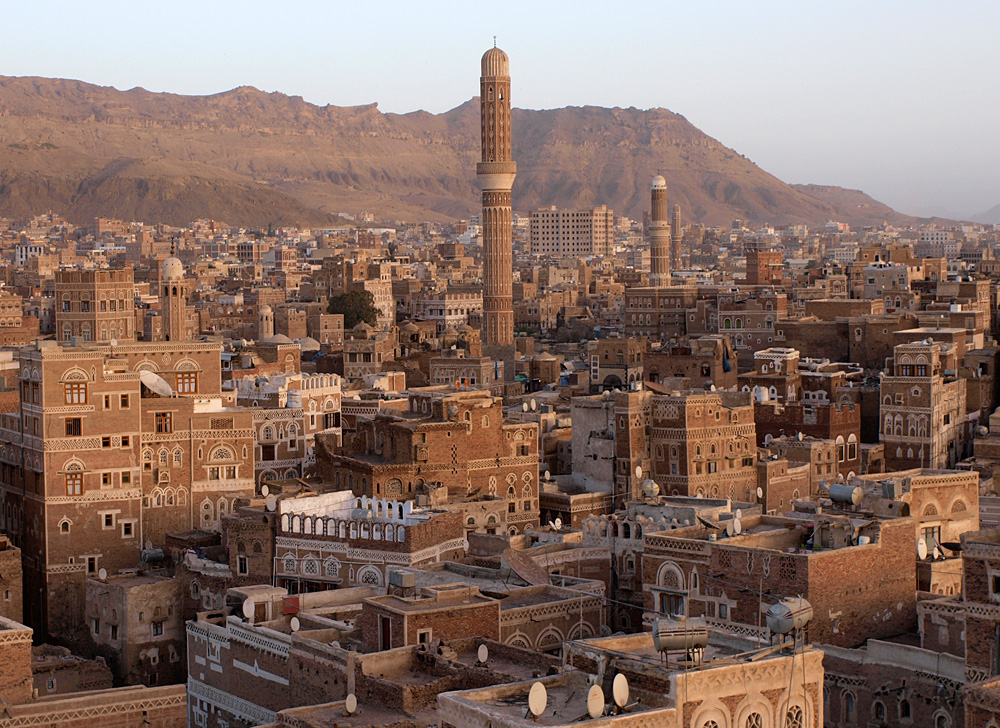
Old Sana'a town with tower buildings

The palace tower or citadel was built at the top of a hill. Historians such as Al-Hamdani, Mohammed Al-Qazwani and Dr. Adnan Tarsis dispute the height of the original palace. Given its grandeur, its height was exaggerated in historic accounts. Most claims are between six and ten storeys. In the early 9th century, it was reported to have been "seven storeys tall with the highest room being of polychrome marble, and its roof a single slab of green marble." Al-Hamdani writing in the tenth-century in the eighth book of his celebrated geography of the antiquities of the Yemen, Al-Iklīl (الإكليل) provides this description:

...a huge edifice of twenty storeys, each storey ten cubits high. (Note: 13 metres (43 ft)in height, perhaps referring to the tower of the palace.) The four facades were built with stone of different colours, white, black, green, red. On the top story was a chamber which had windows of marble framed with ebony and planewood. Its roof was a slab of pellucid marble, so that when the lord of Ghumdán lay on his couch he saw the birds fly overhead, and could distinguish a raven from a kite. At each corner stood a brazen lion, and when the wind blew it entered the hollow interior of the effigies and made a sound like roaring lions.

— Reynold A. Nicholson, A Literary History of the Arabs, page 24

Built over a square layout, the top floor of the tower contained the Bilqis Hall, also described by al-Hamdani (two volumes, preserved in the British Museum), featured a ceiling affixed with eight-piece transparent marble fanlights. Openings at the four corners of the hall provided a clear view of the moon, worshipped by kings in ancient Yemen. Bronze lion figures at each corner of the alabaster ceilings were said to make a roaring sound when the wind passed through them. However, the most extraordinary feature of the palace was said to have been the clepsydra, an ancient time-telling device, which was built therein. A gate, known as the “Qasr Al-Selah”, is said to be the last vestige of the palace tower.

== In pre-Islamic poetry ==
The Ghumdan Palace is mentioned in pre-Islamic poetry with the poets singing about its beauty. Legend states that when birds flew over the palace, their shadows could be seen on the ceiling.

Dhu Jadan al-Himyari (fl. 6th - 7th century) wrote:

You have heard of Ghumdan's towers:
From the mountain top it lowers
Well carpentered, with stones for stay,
Plastered with clean, damp, slippery clay;
Oil lamps within it show
At even like the lightening's glow.
This once-new castle is ashes today
The flames have eaten its beauty away.

The poet Adiy b. Zayd al-Hiri wrote:

What is there after San'a in which once lived
Rulers of a kingdom whose gifts were lavish?
Its builder raised it to the flying clouds,
Its lofty chambers gave forth musk.
Protected by mountains against the attacks of enemies,
Its lofty heights unscalable.
Pleasant was the voice of the night-owl there,
Answered at even by a flute player.

Long after its destruction, the 10th century geographer al Hamdani (c. 893-945) quoted verses reflecting the legend of the tower of Ghumdan:

Twenty stories high the palace stood,
Flirting with the stars and the clouds.
If Paradise lies over the skies,
Ghumdan borders on Paradise.

== See also ==
- List of castles in Yemen
