= Sifat Jazirat al-Arab =

Geographical work by al-Hamdani (d. 940s)

Ṣifāt Jazīrat al-'Arab
- Author: Abu Muhammad al-Hasan al-Hamdani
- Original title: صفة جزيرة العرب
- Language: Arabic
- Genre: Geography, Travel
- Publisher: Brill Publishers
- Publication place: Leiden

Ṣifāt Jazīrat al-'Arab (Arabic: صفة جزيرة العرب, Characteristics Of The Arabian Peninsula) is a book written by the 10th-century chemist, geographer and historian, Abu Muhammad al-Hasan al-Hamdani. The book describes the state of the Arabian Peninsula during the life of al-Hamdani, including detailed descriptions of various flora and fauna and tribes present in the peninsula.

== History ==
After the discovery of its manuscripts, the Ṣifāt Jazīrat al-'Arab was reprinted and then published in Leiden in the year 1884 by Brill Publishers with editing and annotations by orientalist scholar David Heinrich Müller. It was later reprinted in Cairo in 1953 before the historian Ismail bin Ali al-Akwa further edited and annotated the work in 1974, publishing the revised version in 1990. Dar Al Afaq Al Arabiya published another version of the 1990 edition in 2000.

The Ṣifāt Jazīrat al-'Arab is also regarded as one of al-Hamdani's most referenced works.

== Content ==
The book provides detailed descriptions of the Arabian Peninsula in the 10th century. (Note: al-Hamdani states that the book was written in the 4th century of the Islamic Hijri calendar, which can be calculated to the 10th century CE.) In the book, al-Hamdani also quotes from prior geographers like Claudius Ptolemy as well as the Kitāb Hirmis al-ḥakīm (The Book of Hermes the Wise). Flora and fauna of the Arabian Peninsula are described in great detail, while the tribes al-Hamdani interacted with are also listed down. Towards the end of the book, there are poems as well as supplications (du'a).

Sites described by al-Hamdani in the book include the historical and archeological site of Thaj, now in present-day Saudi Arabia. He also describes where gold and silver can be found in the Arabian Peninsula.

== Discrepancies ==
According to al-Akwa, editor of the 1990 version, there were several discrepancies in the original forms of the manuscripts. For example, al-Hamdani did not describe the Abyan Governorate despite explicitly saying that he had already described it. He also did not describe Oman, instead giving a few lines of commentary on it, which was unusual as his main aim of writing the book was to describe every region of the Arabian Peninsula with adequate detail.

== See also ==
- Al-Iklil, a book by al-Hamdani about Yemeni history
