= Rayʽan =

Rayʿān رَيْعَان
- Village
- Location in Yemen Rayʿān (Middle East) Rayʿān (West and Central Asia)
- Coordinates: 15.36616°N 44.08551°E
- Country: Yemen
- Governorate: Sanaa
- District: Hamdan
- Elevation: 8,343 ft (2,543 m)
- Time zone: UTC+3 (Yemen Standard Time)

Rayʽan (Arabic: رَيْعَان Rayʿān) is a village in Hamdan District of Sanaa Governorate, Yemen. It is located a short distance from the head of the Wadi Dahr near Bayt Naʽam, so that all the water coming down to the wadi from Jabal An-Nabi Shu'ayb passes through a steep, narrow valley, just north of Rayʽan.

== History ==
There was once a dam in the valley north of Rayʽan, until it was destroyed by an earthquake in 245 A.H. (859 C.E.). The dam's exact purpose is unclear, but Robert T.O. Wilson suggested that it "may have helped to control floodwaters which would otherwise pass unchecked into Wadi Dahr." Such a flood happened in 1974. From the Rasulid period onward, Rayʽan was frequently used as a military encampment.
