= Dame (restaurant) =

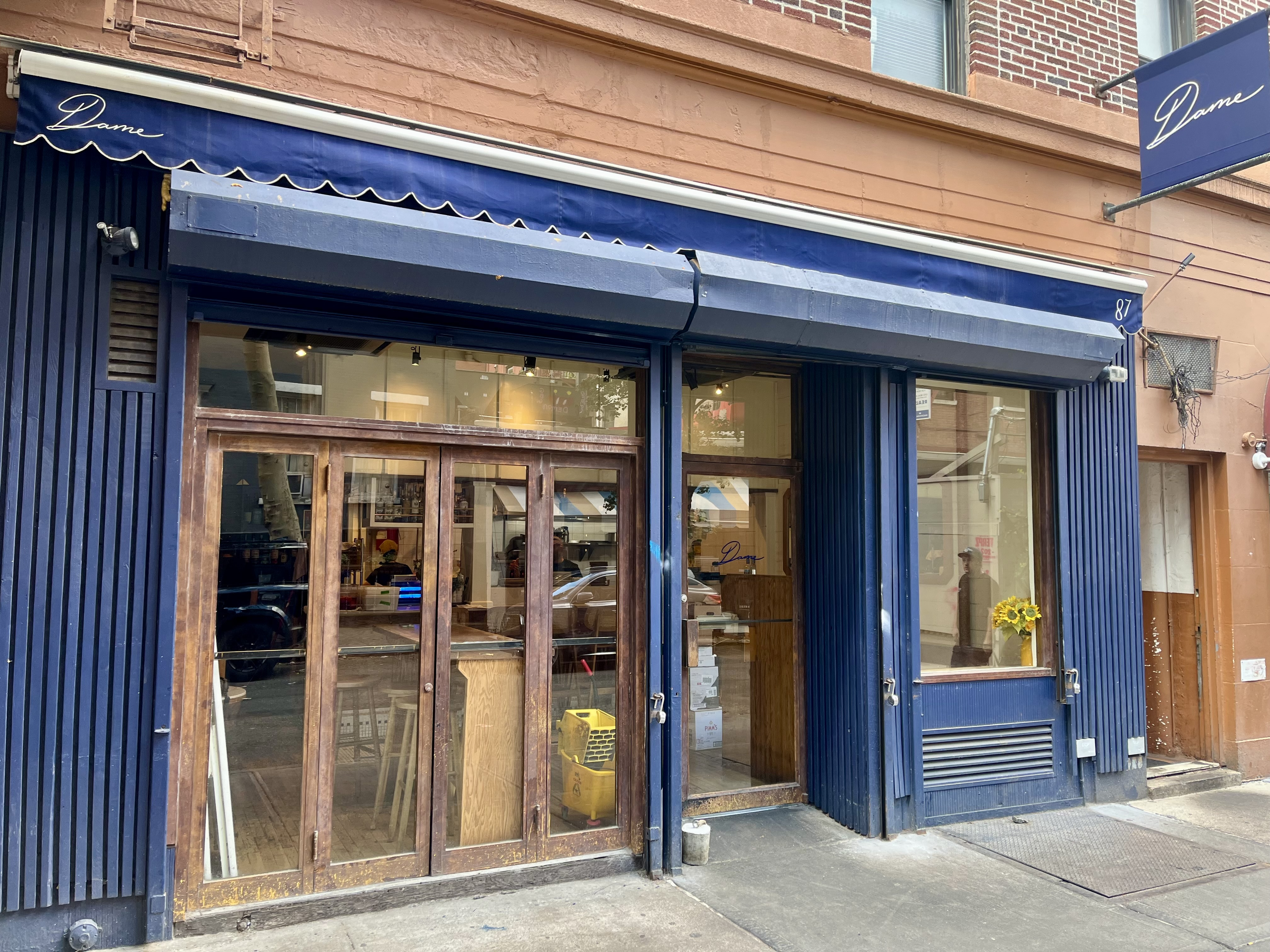
- The restaurant's exterior in 2024
- Interactive map of Dame

Restaurant information
- Location: 87 MacDougal St, New York, New York
- Coordinates: 40°43′44″N 74°00′05″W
- Website: damenewyork.com

Dame is a restaurant in New York City. The restaurant serves seafood and British cuisine.

== History ==
The restaurant first opened in 2020 as a pop up in a coffee shop on the Lower East Side, and later, on MacDougal Street. The pop-up was originally called "Dame Summer Club". The restaurant's operators, Patricia Howard and Ed Szymanski, eventually signed a lease for a permanent location, next to the second pop up venue on MacDougal. Howard and Szymanksi met while working at The Beatrice Inn.

The restaurant is located near Lord's, a restaurant also run by Howard and Szymanski. Lord's opened in 2022.

== Reviews and accolades ==
Hannah Goldfield, in a positive review of the restaurant published by The New Yorker, praised the fish and chips as the best preparation of the dish she had ever eaten. Pete Wells praised the restaurant, writing in his review that it had "a fresh point of view" on presenting seafood. Wells highlighted Dame's fish and chips as his favorite entrée served by the restaurant.

The restaurant was added to the Michelin Guide for New York City in 2022.

== See also ==
- List of British restaurants
