= Great Mosque of Sanaa =

Mosque in Sanaa, Yemen

Great Mosque of Sanaa al-Jāmiʿ al-Kabīr bi-Ṣanʿāʾ
- الجامع الكبير بصنعاء
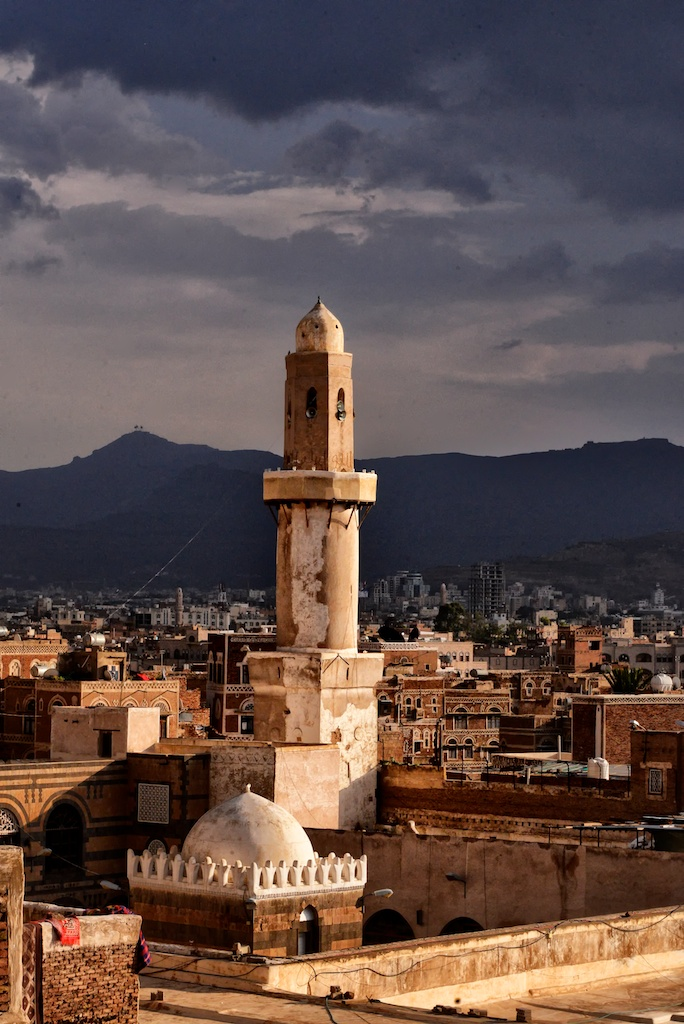
- One of two minarets of Great Mosque in Sanaa

- Location within Sanaa

Religion
- Affiliation: Islam
- Province: Amanat Al-Asemah
- Ecclesiastical or organisational status: In use
- Leadership: Initially Muhammad and later Umayyad caliph al-Walid I
- Year consecrated: 7th–8th century
- Status: Active

Location
- Location: Yemen
- Municipality: Sanaa
- Coordinates: 15.3531°N 44.2149°E

Architecture
- Type: Mosque
- Style: Yemeni
- Groundbreaking: 630 AD
- Completed: Renovation 705 and 715 AD

Specifications
- Length: 80 m (260 ft)
- Width: 60 m (200 ft)
- Minaret: Two
- Materials: Brick and stone

UNESCO World Heritage Site
- Part of: Old City of Sanaa
- Criteria: Cultural: iv, v, vi
- Reference: 385
- Inscription: 1986 (10th Session)
- Endangered: 2015 - Present

The Great Mosque of Sanaa (Arabic: الجامع الكبير بصنعاء, romanized: al-Jāmiʿ al-Kabīr bi-Ṣanʿāʾ) is an ancient mosque in Sanaa, Yemen, and one of the oldest mosques in the world. The mosque is said to have been founded in the early Islamic period, suggested to be in 633. While the precise date of construction is unknown, the earliest recorded renovations occurred under Caliph al-Walid I in the early 8th century, implying a possible earlier date of construction. The mosque was reportedly built in part from spolia from the Himyarite-era Ghumdan Palace and from the Axumite Christian Church of al-Qalis that formerly occupied the site. The Great Mosque is the largest and most notable of over one hundred mosques in the Old City of Sanaa.

The building has undergone renovations in the 8th century, the 13th century, and during the Ottoman period. An important archaeological find was the Sanaa manuscript, discovered there during restoration in 1972. Today, the Great Mosque of Sanaa is part of the UNESCO World Heritage Site of the Old City of Sanaa.

== Location ==
The city of Sanaa was the military center of the pre-Islamic kingdom of the Sabeans and was an important center for the Himyarite Kingdom. The mosque, commissioned by Muhammad, who instructed for its construction within the garden of the Persian governors, was built upon the ruins of Sheba's Ghumdan Palace, between the two areas of Sanaa at the time: al-Qati and al-Sirar. The Great mosque was built near the suq, which was already in place at the time of its construction.

In later years, city planning, expansion, and orientation were greatly influenced by the construction of the Great Mosque and two other mosques on the city's north side.

== History ==
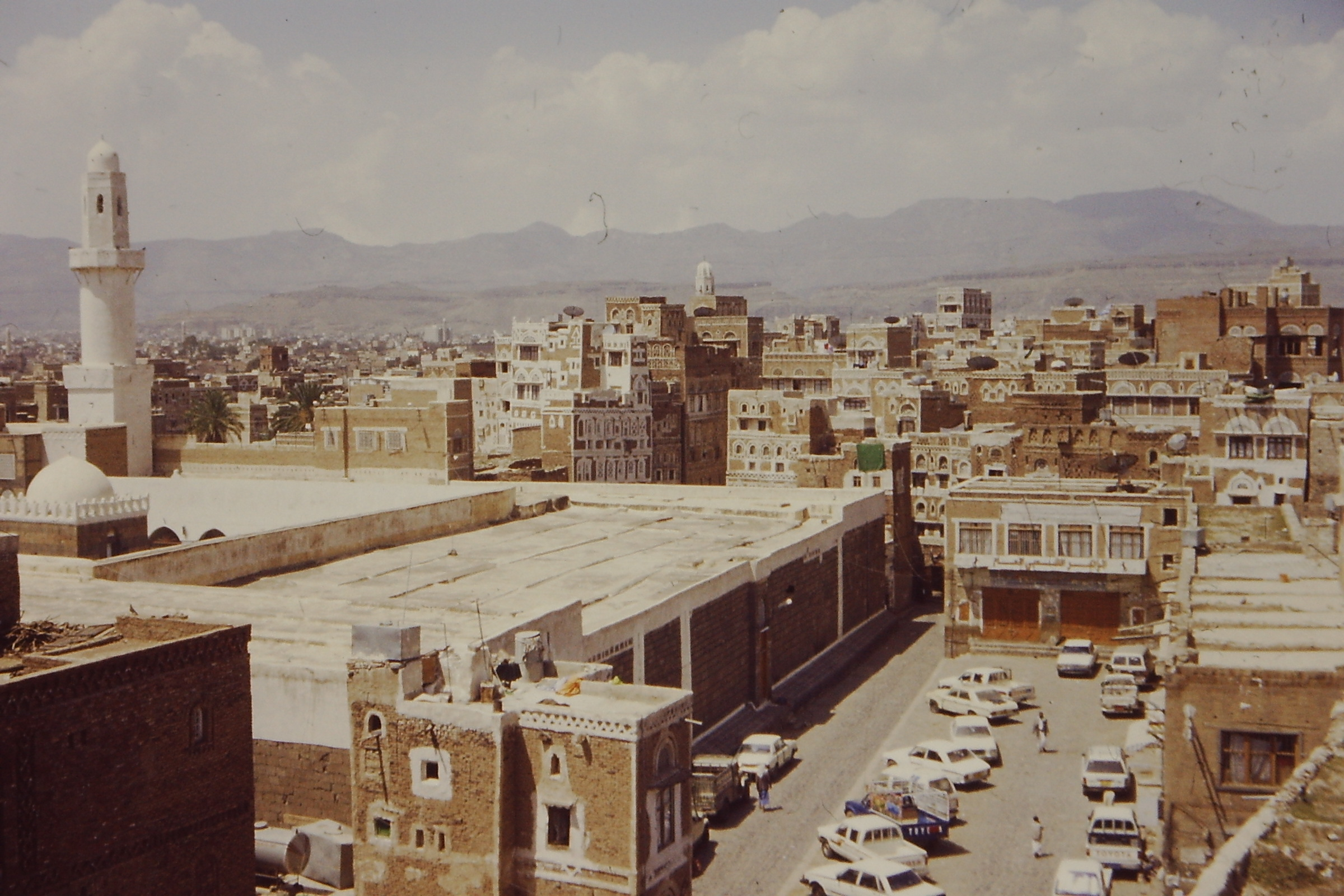
Great Mosque of Sanaa in 2001

Around 630 CE (6 AH), according to early Islamic sources, the Islamic prophet Muhammad was said to have commanded the construction of the Great Mosque of Sanaa, and the mosque is known as the first mosque to have been built outside of the Islamic holy cities of Mecca and Medina. During this post-Hijra period (622-632 CE), Sanaa was central in the propagation of the Islamic religion. Many of the archaeological finds discovered in the Great Mosque substantiate an argument for its construction to the era when Muhammad was alive, including several spolia from the Axumite Cathedral as well as from the Sabaean Ghumdan Palace. During the 7th century, the remains of pre-Islamic Sanaa were largely destroyed when it became the center for the spread of the Islamic faith during the early years of the Hijrah. This is evidenced by the architectural remains of pre-Islamic buildings found within the Great Mosque.

From 705 to 715 (86–96 AH), the Umayyad caliph al-Walid I expanded the mosque. An inscription found in the courtyard of the mosque dates to 753 CE, in the Abbasid period.

In 876/7 CE, floods twice caused substantial damage to the mosque, after which it was renovated.

In the early 9th century, a minaret was constructed on the east side. In the year 911 CE, Karmatis invaded the city, damaging the mosque.

In the twelfth century, 1130 CE, the Isma`ili Queen Arwa al-Sulayhi restored much of the mosque. She was responsible for the sculpted ceilings of the mosque's eastern, western, and northern wings. The mosque's western minaret was built as a part of this restoration.

In the early 16th century, the mosque was renovated with a domed square structure and the paving of its courtyard.

== Architecture ==
The Great Mosque is built in a style of stepped stone, which is linked to similar ancient Abyssinian Axumite stonework. The wooden ceilings, made of lacunari's wood, are carved and painted.

The central courtyard measures 80 by 60 metres (260 ft × 200 ft), with prayer halls arranged in a north–south direction. Halls with three aisles aligned along the east–west direction are built with materials of the pre-Islamic period brought from other areas. Within the courtyard is a domed structure dating back to the 16th century. It is an Ottoman building that resembles the Ka'ba in Mecca; however, it is argued that the two are not connected due to the alternating layers of colored materials, which is an ablaq technique, predating Islam within the region. This structure first served as the mosque's treasury, and later as a storage place for waqf and has a large library and other ancient manuscripts. This structure may originally have had a water feature such as an ablution pool beneath it for those wishing to purify themselves when visiting the mosque.

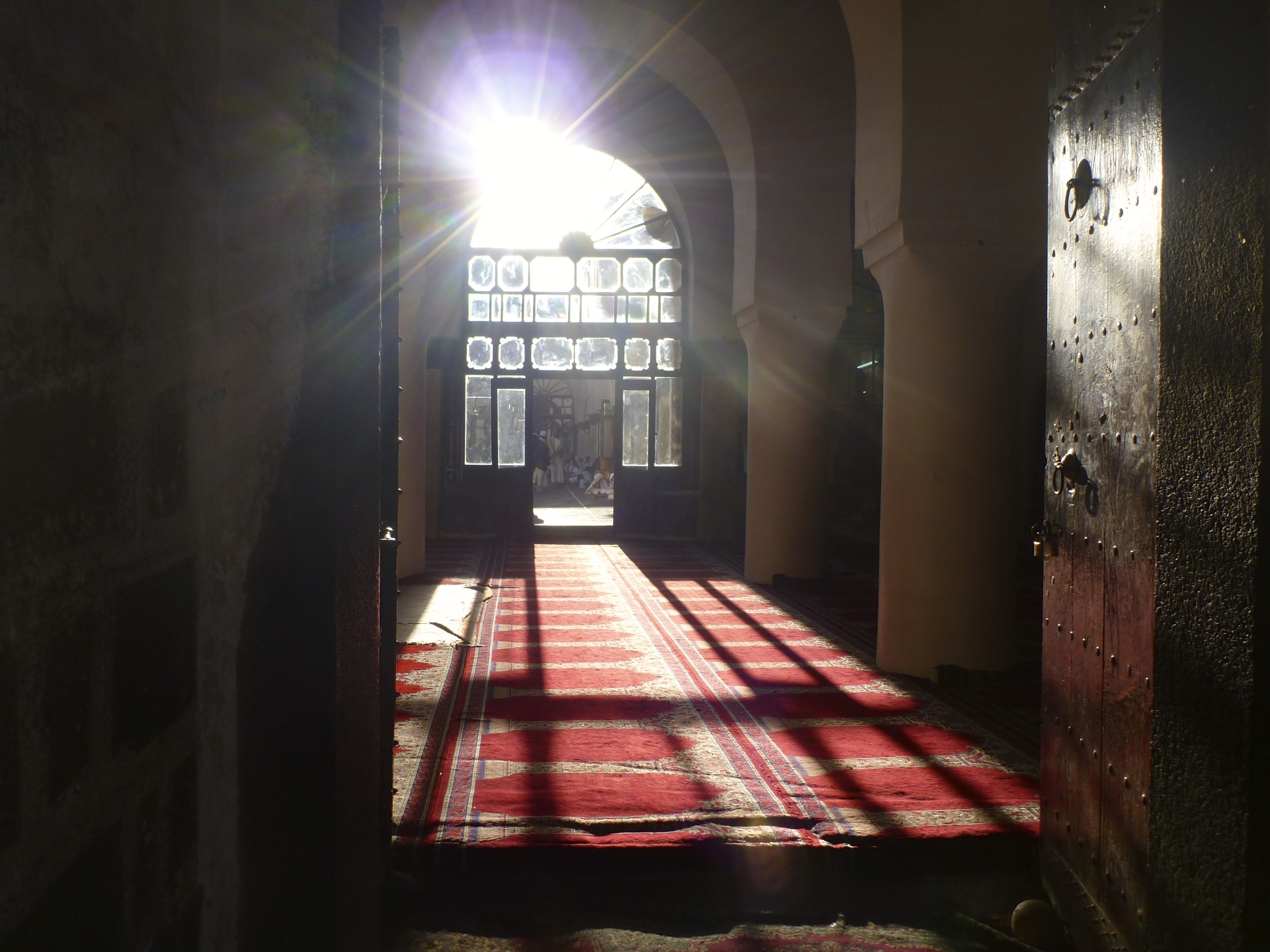
Interior view

The interior stone arcades of the flat roofs of the mosque are suggested to be Byzantine architectural features of the Axumite Empire. This is evidenced by the fact that the Axumite Empire erected its largest cathedral within the city of Sanaa and that remains of this cathedral, as well as from Gumdan palace and Christian and Jewish places of worship, are incorporated into the Great Mosque. Further evidence of this relation is an inscription in the pre-Islamic language of the region, Sabaic, in a reused stone arch support implies it is connected to Byzantine architecture.

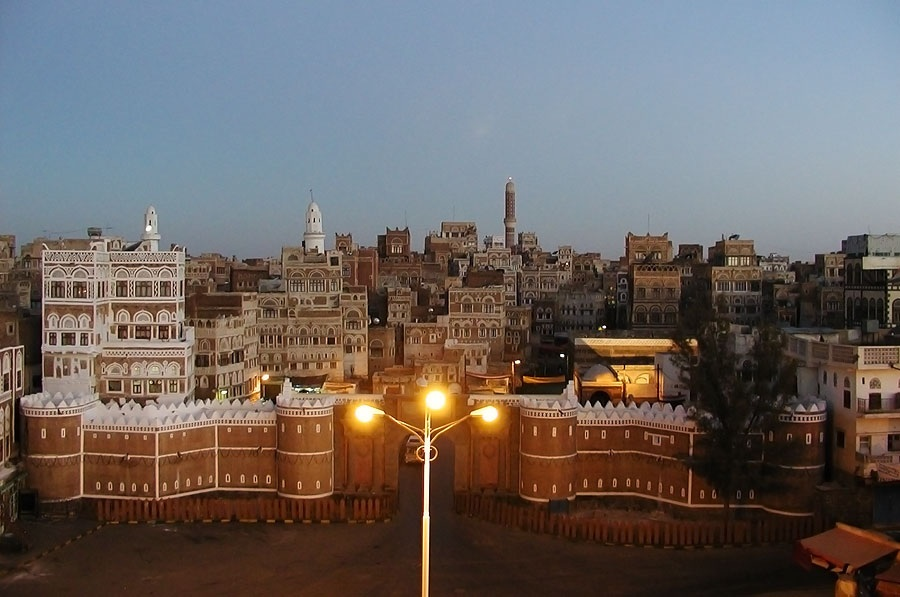
The two white minarets on the left are those of the Great Mosque.

The western minaret, built during Queen Arwa bint Ahmad's restoration, is similar to those of the mosques of the same period built in Cairo, due to her close links with the Fatimid dynasty in Egypt.

== Discoveries ==
In 1972–73, when plaster was removed by archaeologists, they discovered some 65 artifacts, including large quantities of old manuscripts and parchments, as well as the Sanaa manuscript, found by construction workers while renovating an attic wall. Four thousand rare Arabic manuscripts were also uncovered that are linked to the start of Islam, the Umayyad period, and Sheba's Palace of Ghamdan and its destruction. One of the Korans found here is said to have been written or compiled by Imam Ali, which is preserved by the mosque library. Early book bindings found at the mosque have been well documented by scholars such as Ursula Dreibholz (1997).

Other archaeological finds at the Great Mosque are remnants of vaults and old buildings connected to the capital when it contained the Axumite Church of al-Qalis, unearthed in 2006.

== Preservation ==
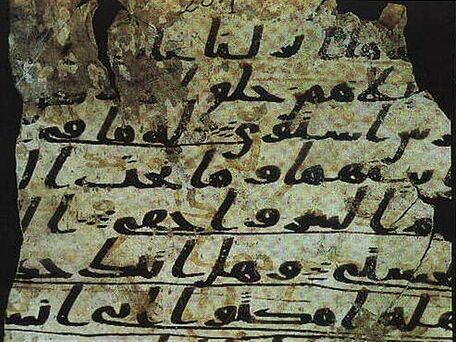
One of the Qur'an fragments discovered in 1972 in the mosque's loft. It contains verses 1-10 of Surah Taha (Chapter 20).

The Great Mosque is included on the UNESCO World Heritage Site List, designated in 1986 as list no. 345, under Criteria: (iv)(v)(vi), which includes 103 mosques, 14 hammams, and over 6,000 houses of Sanaa, all built before the eleventh century. Preservation of the Great Mosque, which is of exceptional religious and historical value, has been supported by UNESCO's World Heritage Institute of Training and Research-Asia and Pacific (Shanghai). Analysis of the damage suffered by the mosque over several centuries includes evidence of floods, rains, soil subsidence, old electrical wiring and connections, groundwater seepage, vandalism, and wars, and also weak old buildings adjoining the mosque.

Repairs and maintenance, initiated in 2003, continue to be carried out in phases, such as electrical system renovation. Plastering has been redone, including restoration of the old traditional plaster known as qudad. Pavings have been improved and minarets are being restored. Improvements have been made in ablution areas and modern toilets were added. Other improvements have been made to the water supply and sewerage systems, as well as the removal of old buildings that do not match the historical and architectural features of the mosque.

== See also ==
- List of mosques in Yemen
  - List of mosques in Sanaa
