= George Dames =

American politician

Member of the U.S. House of Representatives from Missouri's 50th district

Missouri House of Representatives
- In office 1971–1993

Personal details
- Born: 1937 O'Fallon, Missouri
- Died: 2024 (aged 86–87)
- Party: Democratic
- Spouse: Millie M. Hepperman
- Children: 5 (3 sons, 2 daughters)
- Occupation: carpenter

George Dames (June 12, 1937 – December 29, 2024) was an American politician who was a member of the Missouri House of Representatives from 1971 to 1993. Dames was educated at Assumption Elementary School and Assumption High School in O'Fallon, Missouri. He married Millie Hepperman on June 27, 1970, in O'Fallon, Missouri. Dames died at his home on December 29, 2024, at the age of 87.
