= Dame (surname) =

Dame is a surname. Notable people with the surname include:

- Edmond Dame (1893–1956), French sport wrestler
- Enid Dame (1943–2003), American poet and writer
- Gilman M. Dame, American politician
- Harriet Patience Dame (1815–1900), American Civil War nurse
- Harry A. Dame (1878–1933), American football player and coach
- Napoleon Dame (1913–2006), Canadian ice hockey player
- Paul Dame, American politician
- Pierrette Dame (born 1936), French archer
- Tom Dame, American astronomer
- William H. Dame (1819–1884), American politician

== See also ==
- Olivier Dame-Malka (born 1990), Canadian-born French ice hockey player
- Dames (surname)
