= Madame (clothing) =

Indian clothing company

Madame was established in the early 1980s, based in Gurugram, Haryana. There are over 800 employees. The brand is targeted at teenage and younger women.

The brand opened its first exclusive store in Mumbai in 2002. There were 58 exclusive stores in 42 cities in 2009. There were 64 exclusive stores in 2010, and also 600 multi-brand outlets. In 2014, there were 102 exclusive stores across India and also four stores in Saudi Arabia.

Madame signed up Tara Sutaria as the brand ambassador in 2021.
