= Salhin =

Sabaean palace in Yemen

Salhin also spelled Silhin (Arabic: سلحين, romanized: Salḥīn, Musnad: 𐩪𐩡𐩢𐩬, s¹lḥn) is a Sabaean palace that is located in Marib, Yemen. The exact location of the palace is still unknown due to the lack of excavations in Yemen. The palace is mentioned many times in South Arabian inscriptions as well as Arab traditions.

== Arab tradition ==
Salhin is one of the most famous Yemeni castles in Arab tradition. It has been praised by Arabs in their poems and proverbs. It is believed to be the palace of Balqis (Queen of Sheba). According to Nashwan al-Himyari, the palace was the royal residence of the Himyarite kings, it belonged to Tubb'ah and it was said that it was built by an order of Balqis the daughter of al-Hadhad and that her throne, that is mentioned in the Quran, was in it.

According to some Arab traditions, Solomon ordered the Jinn to build the palace for Balqis. However, other Arab traditions state that it was a Tubba' who gave orders to construct Salhin. According to Mu'jam al-Buldan, some people believe that demons wrote in a Himyaritic inscription in Yemen, "we built Salhin, working on it continuously for seventy-seven years". Al-Hamdani dismisses this tradition because the time between when Balqis met Solomon and Solomon's death is only seven years and after Solomon's death, the Jinn refused to continue their work. Al-Hamdani also cites Dhu Jadan's poem which says, "will men built houses [henceforth] after Salhin [has been destroyed]".
