= Suq Bayt Naʽam =

Suq Bayt Naʽam سوق بيت نعم
- Village
- Location in Yemen
- Coordinates: 15.4204°N 44.08315°E
- Country: Yemen
- Governorate: Sanaa
- District: Hamdan
- Elevation: 8,068 ft (2,459 m)
- Time zone: UTC+3 (Yemen Standard Time)

Suq Bayt Naʽam (Arabic: سوق بيت نعم Sūq Bayt Naʽam), also called simply Bayt Naʽam and known historically as Bayt Anʽam, is a village in the Hamdan District of the Sanaa Governorate of Yemen. It is located at the uppermost part of the Wadi Dahr, where the water from the catchment area above Lu'lu'ah descends into the wadi through a narrow gorge, overlooked by a fort. The road from Sanaa to Shibam Kawkaban passes through here.

== History ==
Bayt Naʽam is called Bayt Anʽam in historical texts from the middle ages and early modern period. Its fort was frequently contested throughout the period, including one occasion in 612 AH (1215 CE) mentioned by Yaqut al-Hamawi as well as in the Ghayat al-amani of Yahya ibn al-Husayn.
