= David Heinrich Müller =

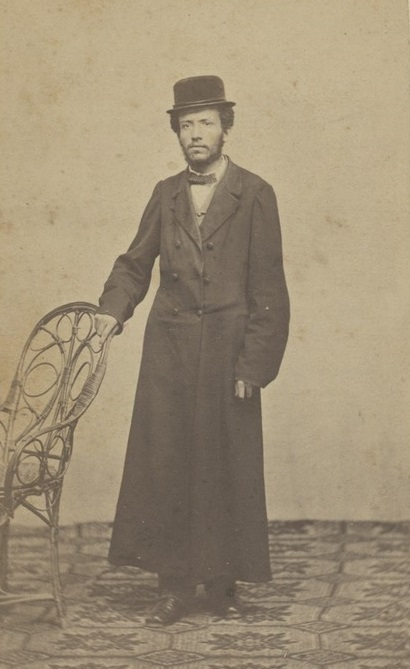
David Heinrich Müller

David Heinrich Müller (born 6 July 1846 in Buczacz, Galicia; died 21 December 1912 in Vienna, Austria) was a Jewish Austrian orientalist.

== Biography ==
He was educated in Vienna, Leipzig, Strassburg, and Berlin; became professor of Semitic philology at Vienna in 1881.

== Works ==
- Himjaritische Inschriften (1875)
- Südarabische Studien (1877)
- Die Burgen und Schlösser Südarabiens (1879–81)
- Sabäische Denkmäler (with Mordtmann, 1883)
- Epigraphische Denkmäler aus Arabien (1889)
- Die altsemitischen Inschriften von Sendschirli (1893)
- Epigraphische Denkmäler aus Abessinien (1894)
- Ezechielstudien (1895)
- Die Propheten in ihrer ursprünglichen Form (1896)
- Südarabische Alterthümer (1899)
- Die Mehri- und Soqotri-Sprache, Vol. I, II, III (1902, 1905, 1907)

He published editions of:

- Kitab al Farq (1876)
- Hāmdāni, Geography of the Arabian Peninsula (1884–91)
- Tabarî, Annales (in part; 1888)

He was an editor of the Wiener Zeitschrift für die Kunde des Morgenlandes.
