= Bani Al Harith district =

Coordinates: 15°35′N 44°18′E

Bani Al Harith District balhareth
- District
- Interactive map of Bani Al Harith District
- Country: Yemen
- Governorate: Amanat Al Asimah

Population (2003)
  - Total: 184,509 now they are around 300’000
- Time zone: UTC+3 (Yemen Standard Time)

Bani Al Harith District (Arabic: مديرية بني الحارث Mudayrīyah Bani Al Ḥarith) is a district of the Amanat Al Asimah Governorate, Yemen founded by a sub-clan of Banu Harith. As of 2003, the district had a population of 184,509 inhabitants.
