= Wadi Zahr =

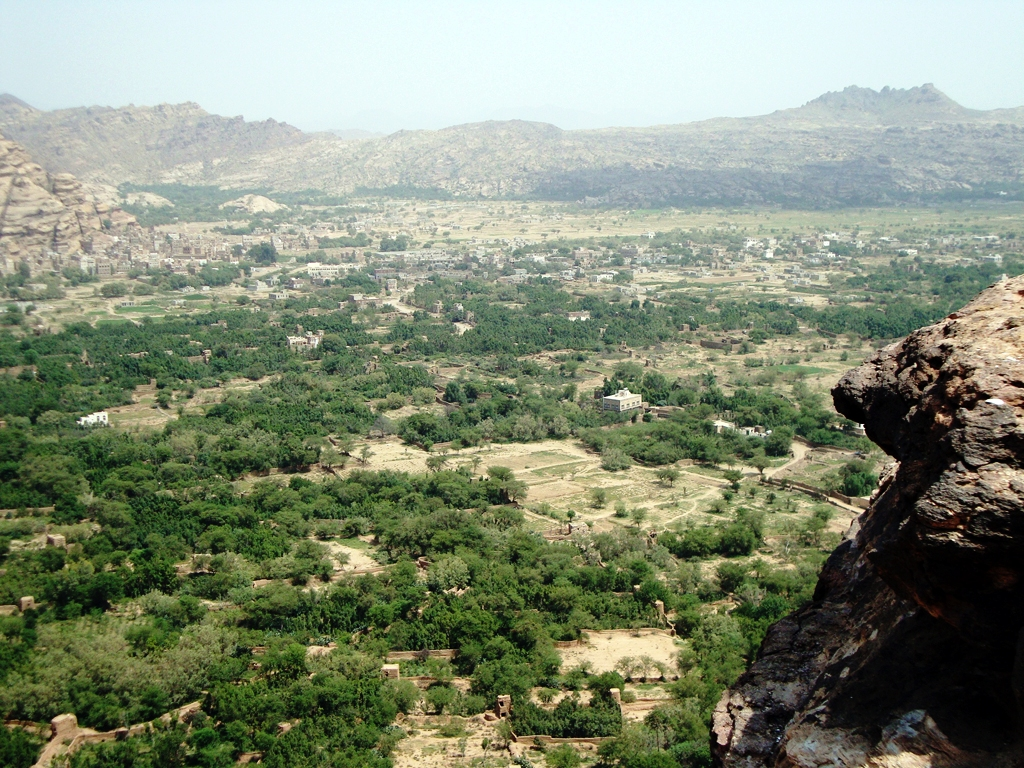

- Location within Yemen
- Floor elevation: 2,229 m (7,313 ft)
- Length: 7 km (4.3 mi) west to east

Naming
- Native name: وادي ظهر (Arabic)

Geography
- Coordinates: 15.45517°N 44.14734°E
- Interactive map of Wadi Zahr

Wadi Zahr (Arabic: وادي ظهر Wādī Ẓahr), also spelled Wadi Dahr (Arabic: وادي ضهر Wādī Ḍahr), is a wadi in Yemen, located just north of Sanaa on the western edge of the Sanaa plain. It is watered by a perennial stream whose source is the large catchment area on the eastern slopes of Jabal An-Nabi Shu'ayb. The wadi proper begins near the village of Suq Bayt Naʽam and then flows eastward for about 7 km through a steep-sided gorge before ending on the Sanaa plain. Wadi Zahr has fertile soil and was historically a strategic area with several forts. The main settlement in the area today is Qaryat al-Qabil.

== Name ==
The 10th-century writer al-Hamdani consistently spells the wadi's name as Wādī Ḍahr, and specifically states that "it is said Wādī Ḍahr, spelt with ḍād." He says that the wadi is named after one Ḍahr ibn Saʽd ibn ʽArīb, of the tribe of Himyar. The spelling Ẓahr, however, is more common.

== History ==
Wadi Zahr is mentioned very frequently in historical sources from the medieval and early modern periods. Its significance came from both its strategic value and its agricultural production. It was a bastion of the Isma'ilis of the Banu Hamdan tribe, who ruled the area.

== Forts ==
Wadi Zahr is the site of several historic forts, including Fiddah, Ṭaybah, and Munif:

=== Fiddah ===
Jabal Fiddah is a steep-sided mountain on the south side of the wadi. Al-Hamdani described it as "a high rocky peak which is very precipitous and (therefore) beyond the reach of climbers." The main fort, built by the Hatimi sultan of Sanaa in 1184 (584 AH), was located below the summit, on the southern side of the mountain. At the top of the mountain was another fortification called al-ʽAnqā'. The fort of Fiddah remained in use until the downfall of the Sharaf al-Din dynasty in the 16th century.

=== Ṭaybah ===
West of Fiddah, and also on the southern side of Wadi Zahr, is the fort of Ṭaybah, which is now in ruins. It was originally called Dawram (or Dūram, the vocalization preferred by Muhammad al-Akwa), and under this name it appears in the Iklil of al-Hamdani and the Tarikh Sanʽa' of al-Razi. The first reference to the modern name Ṭaybah is in the year 1324 (724 AH), in the Ghayat al-amani of Yahya ibn al-Husayn. It is then mentioned several more times in that text as a frequently contested stronghold.

=== Munif ===
The fortress of Munif (Ḥiṣn Munīf), now in ruins, is located on the north side of Wadi Zahr. Its first mention is in the year 1386 (788 AH), also in the Ghayat al-amani.

== See also ==
- Dar al-Hajar, a historic palace in Wadi Zahr
