= Hamdan district =

Coordinates: 15°30′N 44°05′E

Hamdan District همدان
- District
- Interactive map of Hamdan District
- Country: Yemen
- Governorate: Sana'a

Population (2003)
  - Total: 85,370
- Time zone: UTC+3 (Yemen Standard Time)

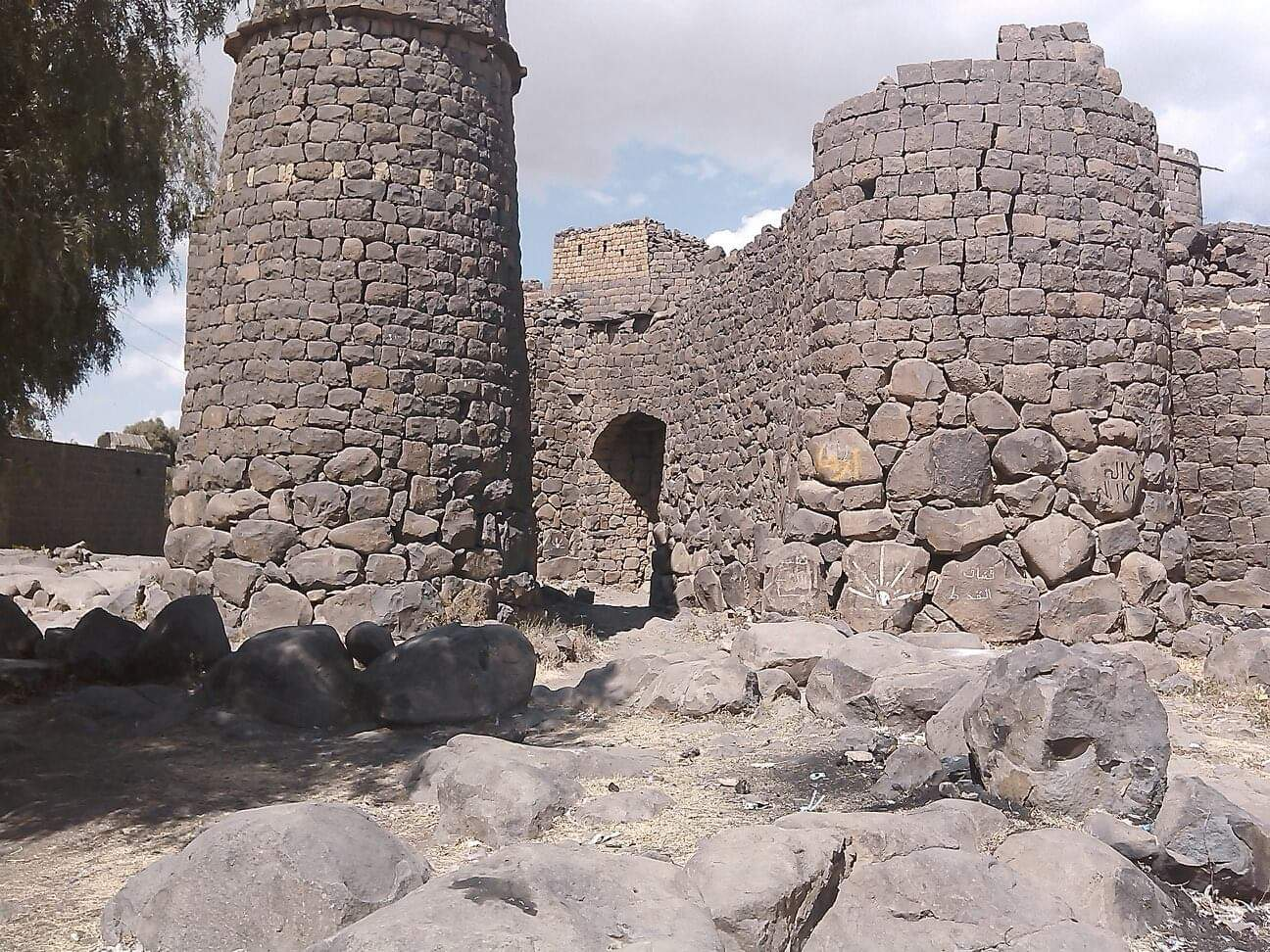
The gatehouse of Khalaqah village, in Hamdan District

Hamdan District (Arabic: مديرية همدان) is a district of the Sana'a Governorate, Yemen. As of 2003, the district had a population of 85,370 inhabitants. It is named after the ancient Yemeni tribe of Hamdan.

== Populated places (incomplete list) ==
- Darwan
- Al-Munaqqab
- Hajar Saʽid
- Haz
- Jirban
- Khalaqah
- Luluwah
- Madam
- Suq Bayt Naʽam
- Rayʽan
