= Abu Muhammad al-Hasan al-Hamdani =

Arab Muslim geographer, chemist, poet, grammarian, historian and astronomer

- أبو محمد الحسن الهمداني
- Born: c. 893; Sanaa
- Died: c. 945-947; Raydah, Amran, Yemen
- Other name: Abu Al-Hasan Al-Hamdani
- Occupations: Geographer, poet, grammarian, historian, and astronomer

Academic work
- Era: Abbasid
- Main interests: Geography, History, Astronomy, Writing
- Notable works: Sifat Jazirat ul-Arab and Al-Iklīl

Abū Muḥammad al-Ḥasan ibn Aḥmad ibn Yaʿqūb al-Hamdānī (Arabic: أبو محمد الحسن بن أحمد بن يعقوب الهمداني, 279/280-333/334 A.H.; c. 893 – 947;) was an Arab Muslim geographer, chemist, poet, grammarian, historian, and astronomer, from the tribe of Banu Hamdan, western 'Amran, Yemen. He was one of the best representatives of Islamic culture during the last period of the Abbasid Caliphate. His work was the subject of extensive 19th-century Austrian scholarship.

== Biography ==
The biographical details of al-Hamdani's life are scant, despite his extensive scientific work. He was held in high repute as a grammarian, wrote much poetry, compiled astronomical tables and is said to have devoted most of his life to the study of the ancient history and geography of Arabia.

Before he was born his family had lived in al-Marashi. Then they moved to Sanaa, where al-Hamdani was born in the year 893. His father had been a traveller and had visited Kufa, Baghdad, Basra, Oman and Egypt. At around the age of seven, al-Marashi started to talk about his desire to travel. Somewhat later he left for Mecca, where he remained and studied for more than six years, after which he departed for Saada. There he gathered information on Khawlan. Later, he went back to Sanaa and became interested in the land that was Himyar, but was imprisoned for two years due to his political views. After his release from prison, he went to Raydahto live under the protection of his own tribe. He compiled most of his books while there and stayed on until his death in 945.

== Writings ==
His Geography of the Arabian Peninsula (Sifat Jazirat ul-Arab) is by far the most important work on the subject, where he describes the geography and the linguistic situation in the Arabian peninsula and Socotra. The manuscript was used by Austrian orientalist, Aloys Sprenger in his Post- und Reiserouten des Orients (Leipzig, 1864) and further in his Alte Geographie Arabiens (Bern, 1875), and was edited by D.H. Müller (Leiden, 1884; cf. Sprenger's criticism in Zeitschrift der deutschen morgenländischen Gesellschaft, vol. 45, pp. 361–394).

His work has been the subject of extensive research and publications by the Austrian Arabist, Eduard Glaser, a specialist on ancient Arabia. The other great work of al-Hamdānī is his ten volume, al-Iklil (the Diadem), concerning the genealogies of the Himyarites and the wars waged by their kings. Volume 8, on the citadels and castles of southern Arabia, has been translated into German, edited and annotated by David Heinrich Müller as Die Burgen und Schlösser Sudarabiens (Vienna, 1881).

Other works said to have been written by al-Hamdani are listed in G. L. Flügel's Die grammatischen Schulen der Araber (Leipzig, 1862), pp. 220–221.

=== List of works ===
- Kitab al-Jawharatayn al-ʻatīqatayn - A book describing metals known at that time, including their physical and chemical properties as well as treatment and processing (such as gold, silver, and steel). He is also considered the first person who explained gravity of Earth in a way similar to magnetic field behavior.
- Sifat Jazirat ul-Arab (صفة جزيرة العرب), Geography/Character of the Arabian Peninsula.
- Kitāb al-Iklīl min akhbār al-Yaman wa-ansāb Ḥimyar (الإكليل من أخبار اليمن وأنساب حمير); Crowns from the Accounts of al-Yemen and the genealogies of Ḥimyar. al-Iklīl consists of ten volumes. However, only four volumes have been found (Vol.1, Vol.2, Vol.8 and Vol.10); the other volumes are missing.
- History of Sabaʾ.
- Language of Himyar and Najran.
