= Bayt Shuʽayb =

Bayt Shuʽayb بيت شعيب
- Village
- Location in Yemen
- Coordinates: 15.29336°N 44.01532°E
- Country: Yemen
- Governorate: Sanaa
- District: Bani Matar
- Elevation: 9,672 ft (2,948 m)
- Time zone: UTC+3 (Yemen Standard Time)

Bayt Shuʽayb (Arabic: بيت شعيب Bayt Shuʽayb) is a village in Bani Matar District of Sanaa Governorate, Yemen. It is located on the eastern part of Jabal An-Nabi Shu'ayb.

== Name and history ==
Bayt Shuʽayb is named after one Shuʽayb b. Mihdam b. Dhī Mihdam, of the tribe of Himyar. It is mentioned three times in the Ghayat al-Amani of Yahya ibn Al-Husayn, with the first mention being in 1025 (416 AH).
