= Geography of Yemen =

- Continent: Asia
- Region: West Asia
- Coordinates: 15°N 48°E
- Area: Ranked 54th
  - Total: 455,503 km^{2} (175,871 sq mi)
- Coastline: 1,906 km (1,184 mi)
- Borders: 1,746 km (1,085 mi) Land borders: Oman: 288 km (179 mi); Saudi Arabia: 1,458 km (906 mi); Maritime borders: Eritrea: Red Sea and Bab al-Mandab; Djibouti: Bab al-Mandab and Gulf of Aden; Somaliland: Gulf of Aden; Somalia: Gulf of Aden and Arabian Sea; India: Arabian Sea
- Highest point: Jabal An-Nabi Shu'ayb; 3,667 m (12,031 ft)
- Lowest point: Arabian Sea; 0 m (0 ft)
- Natural resources: Oil, natural gas, rock salt, marble
- Exclusive economic zone: 552,669 km^{2} (213,387 mi^{2})

Yemen is located in West Asia, at the southern tip of the Arabian Peninsula, between Oman and Saudi Arabia. It is situated at the entrance to the Strait of Bab al-Mandab, which links the Red Sea to the Indian Ocean (via the Gulf of Aden) and is one of the most active and strategic shipping lanes in the world. Yemen has an area of 455,503 square kilometres (175,871 sq mi), including the islands of Perim at the southern end of the Red Sea and Socotra at the entrance to the Gulf of Aden.

Yemen's land boundaries total 1,746 kilometres (1,085 mi). Yemen borders Saudi Arabia to the north (1,458 km or 906 mi) and Oman to the northeast (288 km or 179 mi). Through the Socotra island, Yemen also shares borders with the Guardafui Channel and the Somali Sea.

== Topography ==
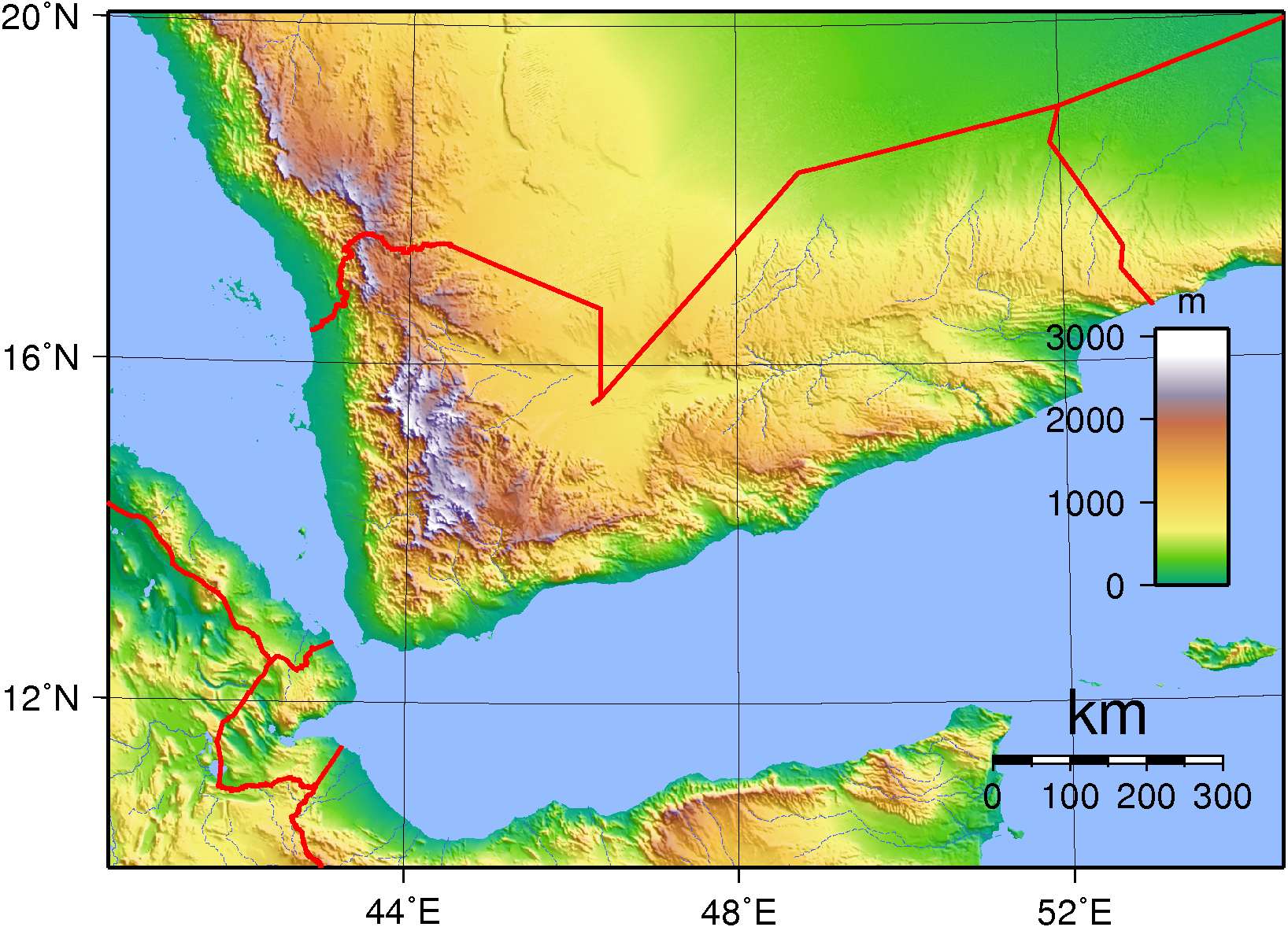
Topography

Yemen's Köppen climate classification map is based on native vegetation, temperature, precipitation and their seasonality. BWh Hot desert BWk Cold desert BSh Hot semi-arid BSk Cold semi-arid CWb Subtropical highland

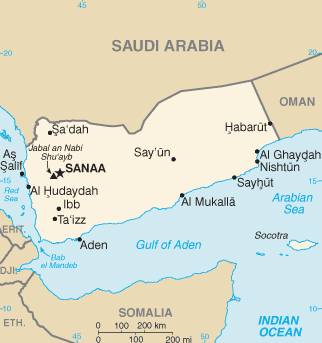
Map of Yemen

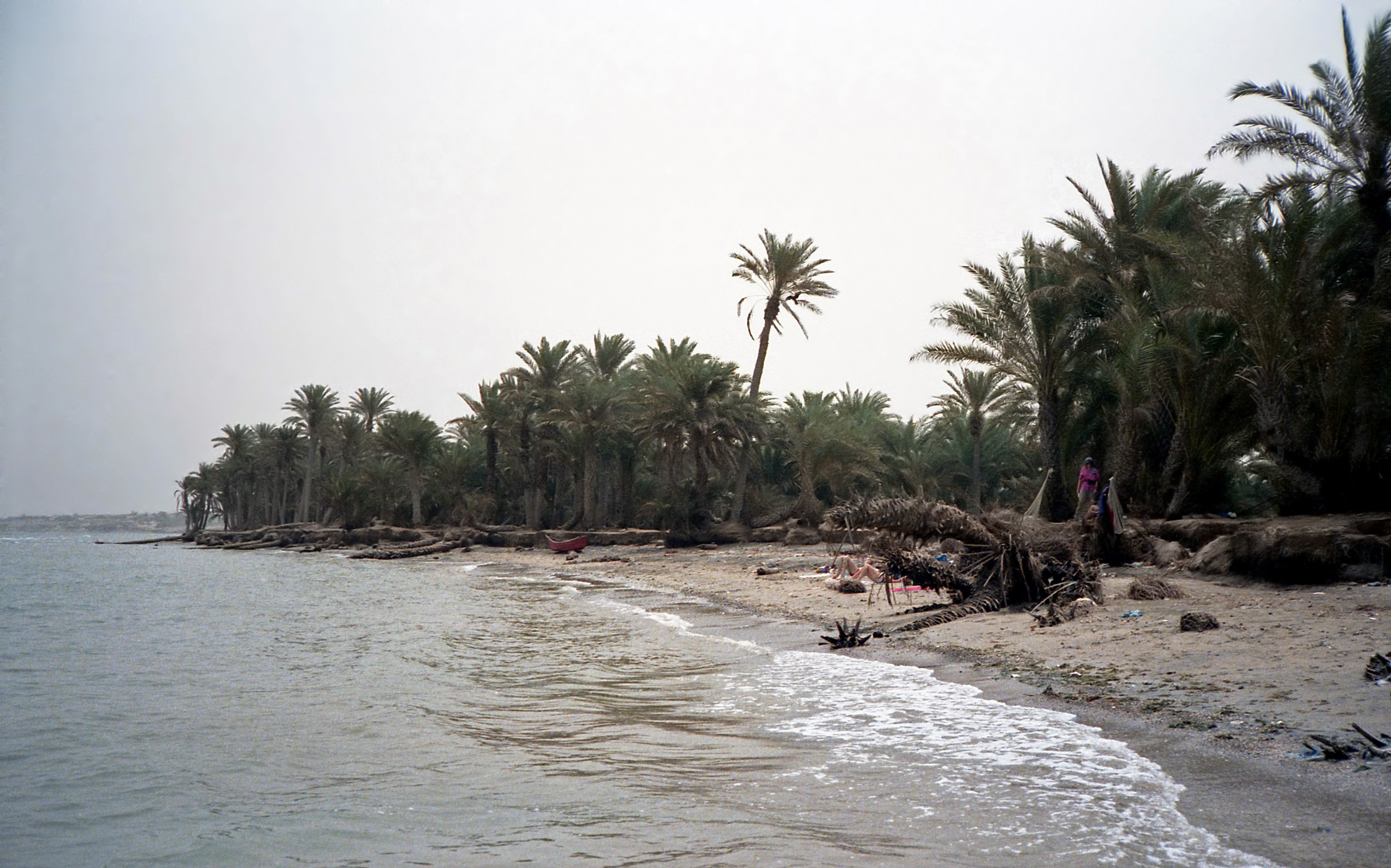
The Tihamah

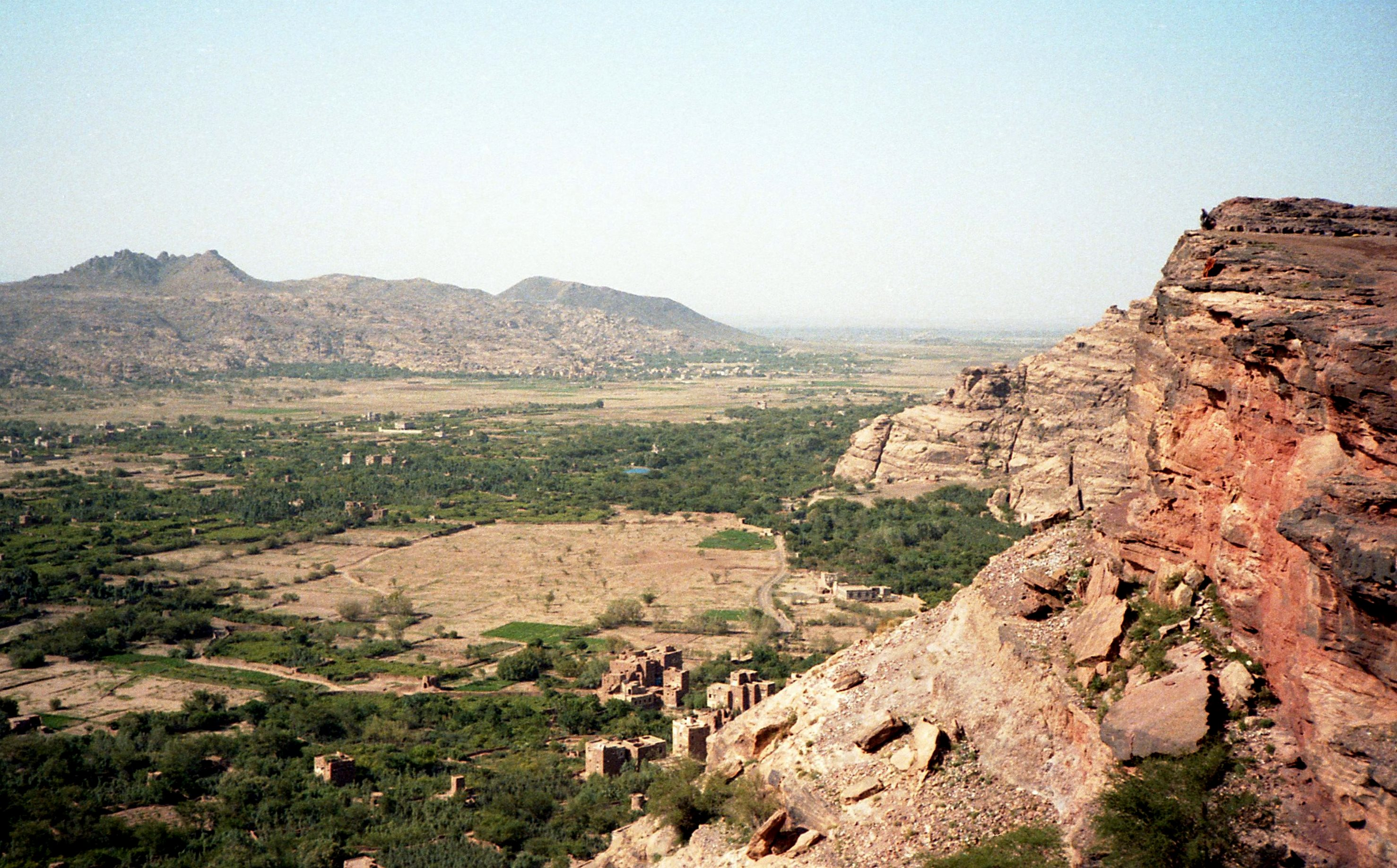
Wadi Dhar

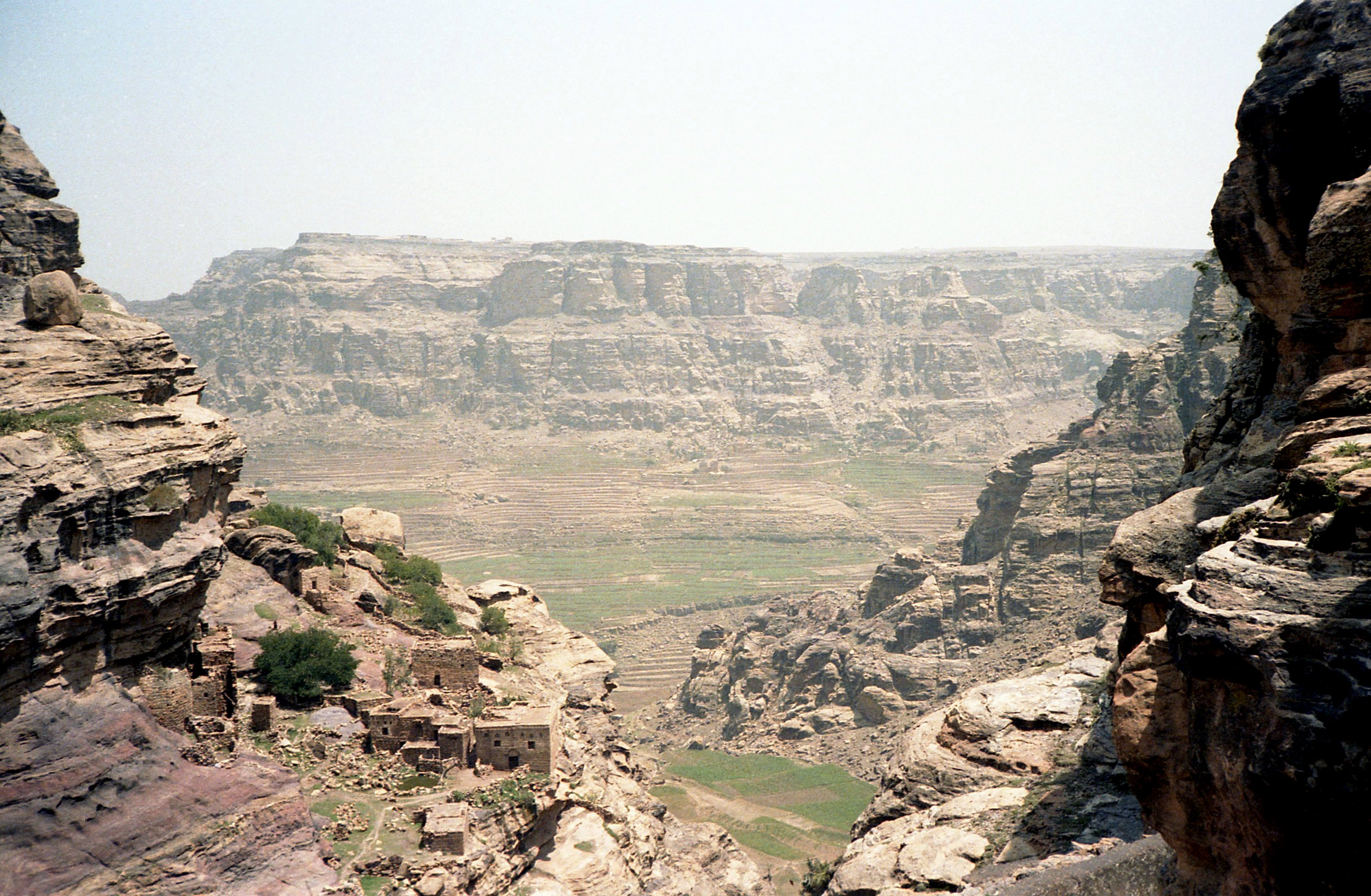
Near Kawkaban, Sanaa Governorate

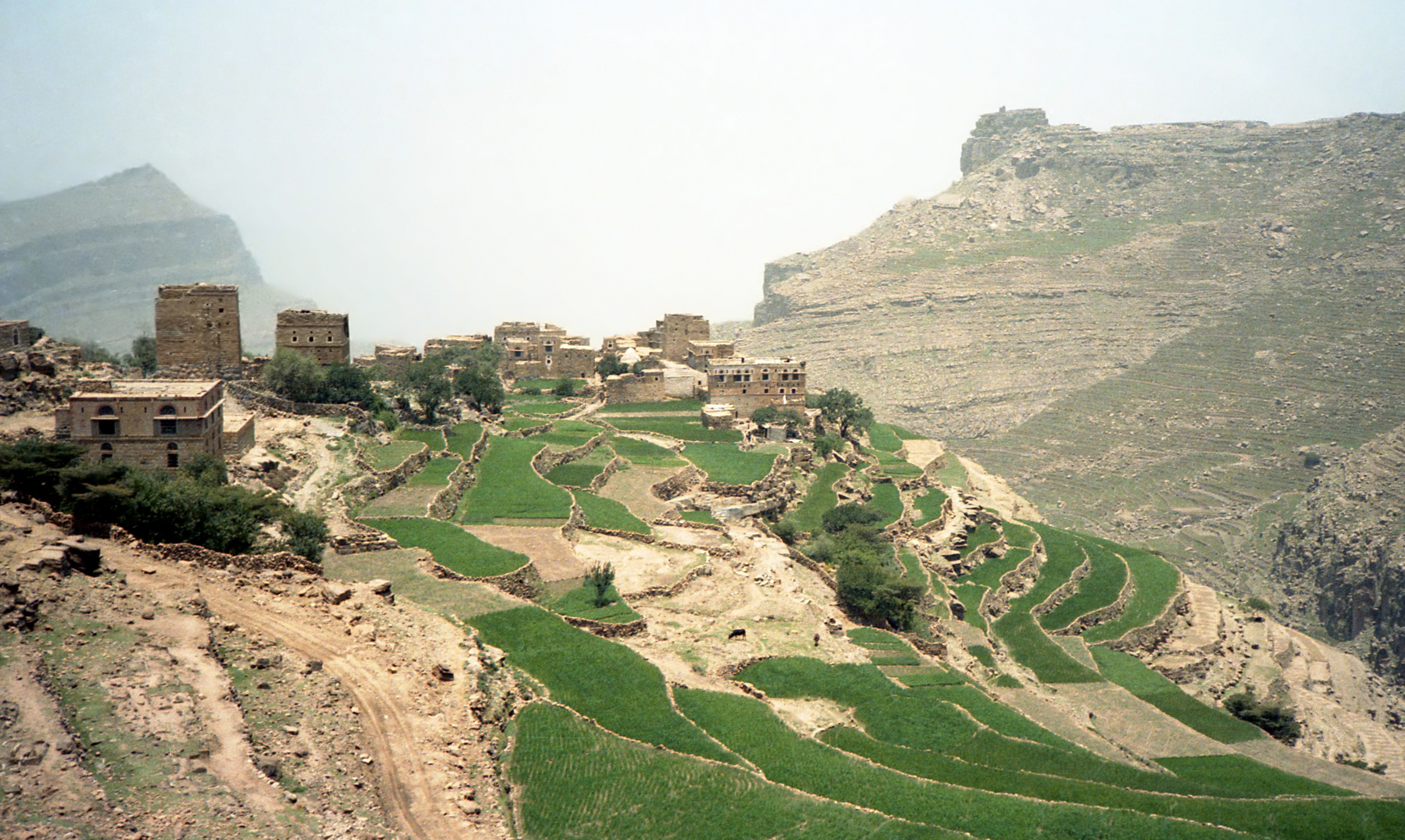
Agricultural terraces in the Haraz-Sarat Mountains

Yemen occupies the southern end of the Arabian Plate.

The country's mountainous interior is surrounded by narrow coastal plains to the west, south, and east and by upland desert to the north along the border with Saudi Arabia. The Tihamah is a nearly 419-kilometre (260 mi) long, semidesert coastal plain that runs along the Red Sea and is part of the Arabian Peninsula coastal fog desert ecoregion. The highland regions are interspersed with wadis, or river valleys, that are dry in the winter months (Yemen has no permanent rivers.) Most notable is the Wadi Hadhramaut in eastern Yemen, the upper portions of which contain alluvial soil and floodwaters and the lower portion of which is barren and largely uninhabited. Both the eastern plateau region and the desert in the north are hot and dry with little vegetation.

In the northeastern Empty Quarter, sands highlight the region, being the largest expanse of sand in the world. It receives little to no rain for extensive periods of time. Little vegetation grows here either. The central highlands are drier than the western highlands because of rain-shadow influences, but still receives sufficient rain in wet years for extensive cropping. Its diurnal temperature variations are among the highest in the world: ranges from 30 °C (86 °F) in the day to 0 °C (32 °F) at night are normal. Water storage allows for irrigation and the growing of wheat and barley while the western highlands are famous for sorghum, coffee, and some tropical fruits like bananas and mangos.

== Elevation ==
Yemen is a continuously elevated country, with only the coastal plains being the lowest-lying areas. Jagged peaks and plateaus cover most of Yemen, and the average elevation in the country is about 2,000 metres (6,600 ft). The interior mountains have elevations ranging from a few hundred meters to the highest point in the country and the Arabian Peninsula, Jabal An-Nabi Shu'ayb, which is 3,666 m (12,028 ft) above sea level, within the Harazi subrange of the Sarawat. The range of elevation is thus from sea level to 3,666 metres (12,028 ft), and among the countries in the Arab world, it is the one with the second highest high point, after Morocco's 4,167 metres (13,671 ft) high Jbel Toubkal. The Yemenis used the elevation of their homeland to stay isolated for thousands of years with foreign trade conducted only when the Yemenis wished to go to the coastal areas. The mountains are young, jagged peaks that are known to rise from an elevation of a few hundred meters to well over 3,000 m (9,800 ft). The mountains can be separated into a western and central highland. The western highlands have peaks reaching around 3,000 metres (1.9 miles), with relatively fertile soil and sufficient and plentiful rainfall. The central highlands is more like a plateau of about 2,000–3,200 metres (1.2–2.0 miles), with rolling hills, small knolls, and some very prominent peaks, but is still relatively more elevated. Less rainfall can be seen in this region, but the summer months give enough to sustain crops.

== Climate ==
Temperatures are lower in most of Yemen than in most of the Arab world due to most of the country being at high elevation, as well as that, it has more annual rainfall due to the fact rainfall occurs more frequently at higher elevations. The highlands enjoy a temperate, rainy summer with an average high temperature of 21 °C (69.8 °F) and a cool, moderately dry winter with temperatures occasionally dipping below 0 °C (32.0 °F). The climate of the Tihamah (western coastal plain) is tropical; temperatures occasionally exceeding 54 °C (129.2 °F), and the humidity ranges from 50 to 70 percent. Rainfall, which comes in irregular heavy torrents, averages 130 millimetres (5.12 in) annually. In Aden the average temperature is 25 °C (77.0 °F) in January and 32 °C (89.6 °F) in June, but with highs often exceeding 37 °C (98.6 °F). Average annual rainfall is 127 millimetres (5 in). The highest mountainous areas of southern Yemen receive from 520 to 760 mm (20.5 to 29.9 in) of rain a year. Some areas of the western highlands, most notably Ibb and Ta'izz, receive from about 1,000–1,500 millimetres (39.4–59.1 in) of rain each year. The capital, Sana'a, receives around 300 mm (11.8 in) a year, it is not uncommon for the northern and eastern sections of the country to receive no rain for five years or more. The Wadi Hadhramaut in the eastern part of Yemen is arid and hot, and the humidity ranges from 35 percent in June to 64 percent in January. Yemen has the most fertile land in the Arabian peninsula.

Climate data for Sanaa, Yemen
Month	Jan	Feb	Mar	Apr	May	Jun	Jul	Aug	Sep	Oct	Nov	Dec	Year
Record high °C (°F)	30 (86)	31 (88)	32 (90)	32 (90)	37 (99)	39 (102)	41 (106)	38 (100)	40 (104)	34 (93)	33 (91)	31 (88)	41 (106)
Mean daily maximum °C (°F)	22.3 (72.1)	24.7 (76.5)	25.6 (78.1)	24.8 (76.6)	25.7 (78.3)	28.2 (82.8)	26.6 (79.9)	25.9 (78.6)	25.1 (77.2)	22.2 (72.0)	20.3 (68.5)	20.5 (68.9)	24.3 (75.8)
Daily mean °C (°F)	12.6 (54.7)	14.1 (57.4)	16.3 (61.3)	16.6 (61.9)	18.0 (64.4)	19.3 (66.7)	20.0 (68.0)	19.6 (67.3)	17.8 (64.0)	15.0 (59.0)	12.9 (55.2)	12.4 (54.3)	16.2 (61.2)
Mean daily minimum °C (°F)	3.0 (37.4)	3.6 (38.5)	7.0 (44.6)	8.5 (47.3)	10.4 (50.7)	10.5 (50.9)	13.4 (56.1)	13.3 (55.9)	10.6 (51.1)	7.9 (46.2)	5.5 (41.9)	4.4 (39.9)	8.2 (46.7)
Record low °C (°F)	−4 (25)	−1 (30)	1 (34)	4 (39)	1 (34)	9 (48)	5 (41)	0 (32)	3 (37)	1 (34)	−1 (30)	−2 (28)	−4 (25)
Average precipitation mm (inches)	5 (0.2)	5 (0.2)	17 (0.7)	48 (1.9)	29 (1.1)	6 (0.2)	50 (2.0)	77 (3.0)	13 (0.5)	2 (0.1)	8 (0.3)	5 (0.2)	265 (10.4)
Average rainy days	2	3	4	5	5	4	4	5	3	3	2	1	41
Average relative humidity (%)	39.3	35.8	38.5	41.1	36.0	27.2	40.1	45.5	29.9	29.0	38.1	37.7	36.5
Mean daily sunshine hours	8	8	8	9	9	8	6	7	8	9	9	8	8
Source 1: Climate-Data.org (altitude: 2259m), Weather2Travel (rainy days, sunshine)
Source 2: Climatebase.ru (humidity), Voodoo Skies (records)

Climate data for Aden
Month	Jan	Feb	Mar	Apr	May	Jun	Jul	Aug	Sep	Oct	Nov	Dec	Year
Record high °C (°F)	31.1 (88.0)	31.7 (89.1)	35.0 (95.0)	37.8 (100.0)	41.1 (106.0)	41.1 (106.0)	41.1 (106.0)	42.8 (109.0)	38.3 (100.9)	38.9 (102.0)	35.0 (95.0)	32.8 (91.0)	42.8 (109.0)
Mean daily maximum °C (°F)	28.5 (83.3)	28.6 (83.5)	30.2 (86.4)	32.2 (90.0)	34.1 (93.4)	36.6 (97.9)	35.9 (96.6)	35.3 (95.5)	35.4 (95.7)	33.0 (91.4)	30.7 (87.3)	28.9 (84.0)	32.4 (90.3)
Daily mean °C (°F)	25.7 (78.3)	26.0 (78.8)	27.2 (81.0)	28.9 (84.0)	31.0 (87.8)	32.7 (90.9)	32.1 (89.8)	31.5 (88.7)	31.6 (88.9)	28.9 (84.0)	27.1 (80.8)	26.0 (78.8)	29.1 (84.4)
Mean daily minimum °C (°F)	22.6 (72.7)	23.2 (73.8)	24.0 (75.2)	25.6 (78.1)	27.7 (81.9)	28.8 (83.8)	28.0 (82.4)	27.5 (81.5)	27.8 (82.0)	24.6 (76.3)	23.2 (73.8)	22.9 (73.2)	25.5 (77.9)
Record low °C (°F)	15.6 (60.1)	17.2 (63.0)	18.9 (66.0)	18.9 (66.0)	21.1 (70.0)	23.9 (75.0)	22.8 (73.0)	23.3 (73.9)	25.0 (77.0)	18.9 (66.0)	18.3 (64.9)	16.7 (62.1)	15.6 (60.1)
Average precipitation mm (inches)	6 (0.2)	3 (0.1)	5 (0.2)	2 (0.1)	1 (0.0)	0 (0)	3 (0.1)	3 (0.1)	5 (0.2)	1 (0.0)	3 (0.1)	5 (0.2)	36 (1.4)
Average precipitation days (≥ 0.1 mm)	3	2	2	2	1	1	2	2	1	1	1	3	20
Average relative humidity (%)	72	72	74	74	72	66	65	65	69	68	70	70	70
Mean monthly sunshine hours	241.8	203.4	217.0	240.0	303.8	282.0	241.8	269.7	270.0	294.5	285.0	257.3	3,106.3
Mean daily sunshine hours	7.8	7.2	7.0	8.0	9.8	9.4	7.8	8.7	9.0	9.5	9.5	8.3	8.5
Source: Deutscher Wetterdienst

=== Climate change ===
Although Yemen has contributed little to causing climate change, it is one of the world's most vulnerable countries to climate change and among the least prepared to handle its effects. Around half of the population is exposed to at least one major climate threat. Climate change impacts in Yemen include increasing temperatures, drought, desertification, disease outbreaks and sea level rise. Extreme weather events like cyclones, floods and landslides have been intensifying in Yemen as a result of climate change. These impacts have already worsened the country's existing water scarcity issues, decreased agricultural and fishery productivity and affected the food security and health of Yemenites.

Yemen is one of only three countries that has not yet joined the Paris Agreement and has not submitted any Nationally Determined Contributions, although they did submit an intended NDC in 2015. To help the country adapt to climate change, The World Bank recommends investments in disaster risk management strategies, renewable energy, water management, soil conservation and climate smart agriculture. However, Yemen faces challenges in accessing climate finance due to low institutional capacity and poor stakeholder coordination.

== Coastline and maritime claims ==
Yemen has 2,400 kilometres (1,500 mi) of coastline along the Arabian Sea, the Gulf of Aden, and the Red Sea. Yemen claims a territorial sea of 12 nautical miles (13.8 mi; 22.2 km), a contiguous zone of 24 nautical miles (27.6 mi; 44.4 km), an Exclusive Economic Zone of 552,669 km^{2} (213,387 mi^{2}) based on 200 nautical miles (230.2 mi; 370.4 km). It has a continental shelf of 200 nautical miles (230.2 mi; 370.4 km) or to the edge of the continental margin.

== Natural resources ==
Yemen's principal natural resources are oil and natural gas as well as agriculturally productive land in the west. Other natural resources include fish and seafood, rock salt, marble, and major unexplored deposits of coal, gold, lead, nickel, and copper.

== Land use ==
Only 2.91 percent of Yemen is considered to be arable land, and less than 0.6 percent of the land is planted with permanent crops. About 6,801 square kilometres (2,626 sq mi) of the land is irrigated. According to the United Nations, Yemen has 19,550 square kilometres (7,550 sq mi) of forest and other wooded land, which constitutes almost 4 percent of total land area.

== Environmental factors ==
Yemen is the sixth most water stressed country in the world.

Yemen is subject to sandstorms and dust storms, resulting in soil erosion and crop damage. The country has very limited natural freshwater and consequently inadequate supplies of potable water. Desertification (land degradation caused by aridity) and overgrazing are also problems. It is a party to international Biodiversity, Climate Change, Desertification, Endangered Species, Environmental Modification, Hazardous Wastes, Law of the Sea, and Ozone Layer Protection agreements.

== Disputed territory ==
A long-standing dispute between Saudi Arabia and Yemen was resolved in June 2000 with the signing of the Treaty of Jeddah. This agreement provides coordinates for use in delineating the land and maritime border, including the section in the eastern desert region of Yemen that potentially contains significant amounts of oil. Friction between the two countries in recent years over security of the borders appears to have been alleviated by the establishment of joint border patrols. Following years of dispute between Yemen and Eritrea over ownership of the Hanish Islands and fishing rights in the Red Sea, in 1999 an international arbitration panel awarded sovereignty of the islands to Yemen. Relations between the two countries remain strained, however, and Yemen continues to protest Eritrean fishing in the disputed territory.

== See also ==
- Mountains in the Arabian Peninsula
  - Hadhramaut Mountains
  - List of volcanoes in Yemen
- Lower Yemen and Upper Yemen
