= Masyab =

Masyab مَسْيَب مُسَيِّب Musayyib
- Village
- Location in Yemen Masyab (Middle East) Masyab (West and Central Asia)
- Coordinates: 15.34109°N 43.97596°E
- Country: Yemen
- Governorate: Sanaa
- District: Bani Matar
- Elevation: 9,495 ft (2,894 m)
- Time zone: UTC+3 (Yemen Standard Time)

Masyab (Arabic: مَسْيَب), also Musayyib (مُسَيِّب), is a village in Bani Matar District of Sanaa Governorate, Yemen. It is located on the northeastern side of Jabal An-Nabi Shu'ayb.

== History ==
According to the 10th-century writer Al-Hamdani, Masyab is named after one Masyab b. Zayd b. ʿAwf b. Yarīm, of the tribe of Himyar. Besides Hamdani, Masyab is mentioned by the history writer Yahya ibn Al-Husayn, as well as by Ali ibn Muhammad al-Abbasi in his narrative concerning Al-Hadi ila'l-Haqq Yahya, the first Imam of Yemen.

In al-Abbasi's account, Masyab is mentioned along with the nearby village of Mahyab as the site of a minor battle between the Yu'firids and followers of the Isma'ili missionary Ali ibn al-Fadl al-Jayshani. Dhu'l-Tawq and Isa al-Yafi'i, two commanders loyal to Ali ibn Fadl, camped at Masyab and Mahyab c. 906 C.E., where they were attacked by the Yu'firid generals Ibn Jarrah and Ibn Kabalah. They were defeated, although 400 of the Yu'firid soldiers were killed in the battle, and afterwards Dhu'l Tawq betrayed and killed Isa al-Yafi'i along with some of his men.
