= Bayt Kahin =

Bayt Kahin بيت كاهن
- Village
- Location in Yemen
- Coordinates: 15.26848°N 44.03143°E
- Country: Yemen
- Governorate: Sanaa
- District: Bani Matar
- Elevation: 8,904 ft (2,714 m)
- Time zone: UTC+3 (Yemen Standard Time)

Bayt Kahin (Arabic: بيت كاهن Bayt Kāhin) is a village in Bani Matar District of Sanaa Governorate, Yemen. It is located to the east of Jabal An-Nabi Shu'ayb.

== History ==
The earliest known mention of Bayt Kahin in historical sources is in 1618 (1027 AH), in the Ghayat al-Amani of Yahya ibn Al-Husayn.
