= Bayt Mahfad =

Bayt Mahfad بيت محفد
- Village
- Location in Yemen
- Coordinates: 15.25215°N 44.17229°E
- Country: Yemen
- Governorate: Sanaa
- District: Bani Matar
- Elevation: 9,245 ft (2,818 m)
- Time zone: UTC+3 (Yemen Standard Time)

Bayt Mahfad (Arabic: بيت محفد Bayt Maḩfad), also spelled Bayt Mahfid, is a village in Bani Matar District of Sanaa Governorate, Yemen.

== History ==
The 10th-century writer al-Hamdani mentions the palaces of Bayt Mahfad along with those of nearby Bayt Hanbas. Writing in 1989, Robert T.O. Wilson said that he was unsure if any remains of the palaces still existed.
