= Waqash =

Waqash وقش
- Village
- Location in Yemen
- Coordinates: 15.15996°N 44.0824°E
- Country: Yemen
- Governorate: Sanaa
- District: Bani Matar
- Elevation: 8,356 ft (2,547 m)
- Time zone: UTC+3 (Yemen Standard Time)

Waqash (Arabic: وقش Waqash) is a village in Bani Matar District of Sanaa Governorate, Yemen. It is at the southern end of the historical territory of the Bani Matar tribe.

== History ==
The first historical mention of Waqash is in 1202 (598 AH). It is described in the Ghayat al-amani of Yahya ibn al-Husayn as a center of the Mutarrifiyyah sect. Indian man how writeen history
