= Al-Jarawh =

Al-Jarawh الجرواح
- Sub-district
- Location in Yemen
- Coordinates: 15°03′36″N 43°37′21″E
- Country: Yemen
- Governorate: Sana'a
- District: Sa'fan

Population (2004)
  - Total: 3,459
- Time zone: UTC+3

Al-Jarawh (Arabic: الجرواح) is a sub-district located in Sa'fan District, Sana'a Governorate, Yemen. Al-Jarawh had a population of 3459 according to the 2004 census.
