= Bayt Naʽamah =

Bayt Naʽamah بيت نعامة
- Village
- Location in Yemen
- Coordinates: 15.29632°N 44.10747°E
- Country: Yemen
- Governorate: Sanaa
- District: Bani Matar
- Elevation: 9,117 ft (2,779 m)
- Time zone: UTC+3 (Yemen Standard Time)

Bayt Naʽamah (Arabic: بيت نعامة Bayt Na‘āmah) is a village in Bani Matar District of Sanaa Governorate, Yemen. It is located on a small western outcrop of Jabal Ayban, about 10 km west of Sanaa.

== Name ==
According to the 10th-century author al-Hamdani, the name of Bayt Naʽamah is derived from that of ʽAmr Dhū Naʽāmah b. ʽĀmīr b. ʽAmr, of the tribe of Himyar. A number of inscriptions also refer to the name as that of a tribe called the Banū Dhī Naʽāmah, which they associated with the tribe of Sahman.

== History ==
Robert T.O. Wilson wrote that M.A. al-Eryani's 1973 work In Yemen History seemingly implied that Bayt Naʽamah was originally located just below its present site, but Wilson himself argued that the upper site would have been more preferable as a defensive position. In his view, the ruins below the present site are "remnants from an earlier expansion". The only historical reference he found to Bayt Naʽamah was to the town being sacked in 647 AH (1249 CE).
