= Bani Araf =

Bani Araf بني عراف
- Sub-district
- Location in Yemen
- Coordinates: 15.1117°N 43.60101°E
- Country: Yemen
- Governorate: Sana'a
- District: Sa'fan

Population (2004)
  - Total: 8,244
- Time zone: UTC+3

Bani Araf (Arabic: بني عراف) is a sub-district located in Sa'fan District, Sana'a Governorate, Yemen. Bani Araf had a population of 8244 according to the 2004 census.
