= Jabal al-Nabi Shua'ib =

Jabal al-Nabi Shua'ib جبل النبي شعيب
- Sub-district
- Location in Yemen
- Country: Yemen
- Governorate: Sana'a
- District: Bani Matar

Population (2004)
  - Total: 4,615
- Time zone: UTC+3

Jabal al-Nabi Shua'ib (Arabic: جبل النبي شعيب) is a sub-district located in Bani Matar District, Sana'a Governorate, Yemen. Jabal al-Nabi Shua'ib had a population of 4615 according to the 2004 census.
