= Bayt Yaram =

Bayt Yaram بيت يرام
- Village
- Location in Yemen
- Coordinates: 15.21213°N 44.14444°E
- Country: Yemen
- Governorate: Sanaa
- District: Bani Matar
- Elevation: 8,980 ft (2,737 m)
- Time zone: UTC+3 (Yemen Standard Time)

Bayt Yaram (Arabic: بيت يرام Bayt Yarām) is a village and historical fortress southwest of Sanaa in Bani Matar District of Sanaa Governorate, Yemen.

== History ==
The early 13th-century writer Yaqut al-Hamawi mentions Bayt Yaram (which he vocalizes as Bayt Yurām) as one of the fortresses of Yemen. It is also mentioned in the Kitab al-Simt of Muhammad ibn Hatim al-Yami al-Hamdani in connection with the events of the year 1264 (662 AH), as "Hisn Yaram". It also appears several times in the Ghayat al-amani of Yahya ibn al-Husayn, misspelled as "Bayt B-rām".
