= Mutwah =

Mutwah متوح
- Sub-district
- Location in Yemen
- Country: Yemen
- Governorate: Sana'a
- District: Sa'fan

Population (2004)
  - Total: 5,003
- Time zone: UTC+3

Mutwah (Arabic: متوح) is a sub-district located in Sa'fan District, Sana'a Governorate, Yemen. Mutwah had a population of 5003 according to the 2004 census.
