= Al-Barwayh =

Al-Barwayh البروية
- Sub-district
- Location in Yemen
- Coordinates: 15°12′21″N 44°03′25″E
- Country: Yemen
- Governorate: Sana'a
- District: Bani Matar

Population (2004)
  - Total: 5,632
- Time zone: UTC+3

Al-Barwayh (Arabic: البروية) is a sub-district located in Bani Matar District, Sana'a Governorate, Yemen. Al-Barwayh had a population of 5632 according to the 2004 census.
