= Haza Sahman =

Haza Sahman حزة سهمان
- Sub-district
- Location in Yemen
- Country: Yemen
- Governorate: Sana'a
- District: Bani Matar

Population (2004)
  - Total: 6,210
- Time zone: UTC+3

Haza Sahman (Arabic: حزة سهمان) is a sub-district located in Bani Matar District, Sana'a Governorate, Yemen. Haza Sahman had a population of 6210 according to the 2004 census.
