= Maswar =

Maswar مسور
- Sub-district
- Location in Yemen
- Country: Yemen
- Governorate: Sana'a
- District: Jihanah

Population (2004)
  - Total: 14,419
- Time zone: UTC+3

Maswar (Arabic: مسور) is a sub-district located in Jihanah District, Sana'a Governorate, Yemen. Maswar had a population of 14419 according to the 2004 census.
