= Bayt ʽAdhran =

Bayt ʽAdhran بيت عذران
- Village
- Location in Yemen
- Coordinates: 15.35445°N 44.13242°E
- Country: Yemen
- Governorate: Sanaa
- District: Bani Matar
- Elevation: 8,609 ft (2,624 m)
- Time zone: UTC+3 (Yemen Standard Time)

Bayt ʽAdhran (Arabic: بيت عذران Bayt ‘Adhrān) is a small village in Bani Matar District of Sanaa Governorate, Yemen. It is located to the west of Sanaa, at the top of the hills overlooking the western edge of the Sanaa plain.

== Name and history ==
According to the 10th-century writer al-Hamdani, Bayt ʽAdhran was named after one Dhū ʽAdhrān ibn Dhī Ma'dhin ibn Jīdān, of the tribe of Himyar. Besides al-Hamdani, other medieval writers to mention Bayt ʽAdhran include al-Razi and Yaqut al-Hamawi.
