= Bani al-Ra'i =

Bani al-Ra'i بني الراعى
- Sub-district
- Location in Yemen
- Coordinates: 15°19′58″N 43°58′37″E
- Country: Yemen
- Governorate: Sana'a
- District: Bani Matar

Population (2004)
  - Total: 4,803
- Time zone: UTC+3

Bani al-Ra'i (Arabic: بني الراعى) is a sub-district located in Bani Matar District, Sana'a Governorate, Yemen. Bani al-Ra'i had a population of 4,803 according to the 2004 census.
