= Al-Arous =

Al-Arous العروس
- Sub-district
- Location in Yemen
- Coordinates: 15°25′04″N 43°54′29″E
- Country: Yemen
- Governorate: Sana'a
- District: Bani Matar

Population (2004)
  - Total: 4,715
- Time zone: UTC+3

Al-Arous (Arabic: العروس) is a sub-district located in Bani Matar District, Sana'a Governorate, Yemen. Al-Arous had a population of 4715 according to the 2004 census.
