= Al-Hadab (Sanaa) =

Al-Hadab الحدب
- Sub-district
- Location in Yemen
- Coordinates: 15°13′38″N 43°51′29″E
- Country: Yemen
- Governorate: Sana'a
- District: Bani Matar

Population (2004)
  - Total: 9,481
- Time zone: UTC+3

Al-Hadab (Arabic: الحدب) is a sub-district located in Bani Matar District, Sana'a Governorate, Yemen. Al-Hadab had a population of 9481 according to the 2004 census.
