= Al-Daraf =

Al-Daraf الطرف
- Sub-district
- Location in Yemen
- Coordinates: 15°02′51″N 43°32′42″E
- Country: Yemen
- Governorate: Sana'a
- District: Sa'fan

Population (2004)
  - Total: 5,291
- Time zone: UTC+3

Al-Daraf (Arabic: الطرف) is a sub-district located in Sa'fan District, Sana'a Governorate, Yemen. Al-Daraf had a population of 5291 according to the 2004 census.
