= Madwal (Sanaa) =

Madwal مدول
- Sub-district
- Location in Yemen
- Country: Yemen
- Governorate: Sana'a
- District: Sa'fan

Population (2004)
  - Total: 4,007
- Time zone: UTC+3

Madwal (Arabic: مدول) is a sub-district located in Sa'fan District, Sana'a Governorate, Yemen. Madwal had a population of 4007 according to the 2004 census.
