= Al-Yamanyah al-Sufla =

Al-Yamanyah al-Sufla اليمانية السفلى
- Sub-district
- Location in Yemen
- Coordinates: 15°10′18″N 44°25′43″E
- Country: Yemen
- Governorate: Sana'a
- District: Jihanah

Population (2004)
  - Total: 16,850
- Time zone: UTC+3

Al-Yamanyah al-Sufla (Arabic: اليمانية السفلى) is a sub-district located in Jihanah District, Sana'a Governorate, Yemen. Al-Yamanyah al-Sufla had a population of 16850 according to the 2004 census.
