= Baqlan =

Baqlan بقلان
- Sub-district
- Location in Yemen
- Coordinates: 15.08084°N 44.13807°E
- Country: Yemen
- Governorate: Sana'a
- District: Bani Matar

Population (2004)
  - Total: 4,461
- Time zone: UTC+3

Baqlan (Arabic: بقلان) is a sub-district located in Bani Matar District, Sana'a Governorate, Yemen. Baqlan had a population of 4,461 according to the 2004 census.
