= ʽAttan =

ʽAttan عطان
- Village
- Location in Yemen
- Coordinates: 15.31392°N 44.17808°E
- Country: Yemen
- Governorate: Sanaa
- District: Bani Matar
- Elevation: 7,785 ft (2,373 m)
- Time zone: UTC+3 (Yemen Standard Time)

ʽAttan (Arabic: عطان ‘Aţţān), also transliterated as ʽIttan and known historically as ʽAḍudān, is a village in Bani Matar District of Sanaa Governorate, Yemen. It is a short distance southwest of Sanaa, with the two being separated by a long, low hill.

== Name and history ==
According to Robert T.O. Wilson, the older form of the name ʽAttan was ʽAḍudān, as it appears in most historical sources. Both forms are found in the works of the 10th-century writer al-Hamdani, although never in the same one. Wilson also pointed to the name of the Fajj ʽAttan, a prominent landform in the hill between ʽAttan and Sanaa, as most likely being the same as the Fajj ʽAḍudān mentioned by al-Razi.

In addition to al-Hamdani and al-Razi, ʽAttan was mentioned by the geographers al-Bakri and Yaqut al-Hamawi, as well as in the historical accounts by Yahya ibn al-Husayn, Muhammad ibn Hatim al-Yami al-Hamdani, and Ali ibn Muhammad al-Abbasi. It was the site of a fortress.
