= Shihab al-Alla =

Shihab al-Alla شهاب الأعلى
- Sub-district
- Location in Yemen
- Country: Yemen
- Governorate: Sana'a
- District: Bani Matar

Population (2004)
  - Total: 6,316
- Time zone: UTC+3

Shihab al-Alla (Arabic: شهاب الأعلى) is a sub-district located in Bani Matar District, Sana'a Governorate, Yemen. Shihab al-Alla had a population of 6316 according to the 2004 census.
