= Bani Jarbin =

Bani Jarbin بني جربن
- Sub-district
- Location in Yemen
- Coordinates: 15°00′48″N 43°36′00″E
- Country: Yemen
- Governorate: Sana'a
- District: Sa'fan

Population (2004)
  - Total: 2,626
- Time zone: UTC+3

Bani Jarbin (Arabic: بني جربن) is a sub-district located in Sa'fan District, Sana'a Governorate, Yemen. Bani Jarbin had a population of 2626 according to the 2004 census.
