= Qarwa' =

Qarwa' قروى
- Sub-district
- Location in Yemen
- Coordinates: 15.28939°N 44.48764°E
- Country: Yemen
- Governorate: Sana'a
- District: Jihanah

Population (2004)
  - Total: 7,125
- Time zone: UTC+3

Qarwa' (Arabic: قروى) is a sub-district located in Jihanah District, Sana'a Governorate, Yemen. Qarwa' had a population of 7125 according to the 2004 census.
