= Al-Magharib (Sanaa) =

Al-Magharib المغارب
- Sub-district
- Location in Yemen
- Coordinates: 15.03006°N 43.62737°E
- Country: Yemen
- Governorate: Sana'a
- District: Sa'fan

Population (2004)
  - Total: 2,818
- Time zone: UTC+3

Al-Magharib (Arabic: المغارب) is a sub-district located in Sa'fan District, Sana'a Governorate, Yemen. Al-Magharib had a population of 2818 according to the 2004 census.
