= Raba'al-Abs =

Raba'al-Abs ربع العبس
- Sub-district
- Location in Yemen
- Coordinates: 14°58′51″N 44°14′10″E
- Country: Yemen
- Governorate: Sana'a
- District: Bilad Ar Rus

Population (2004)
  - Total: 10,229
- Time zone: UTC+3

Raba'al-Abs (Arabic: ربع العبس) is a sub-district located in Bilad Ar Rus District, Sana'a Governorate, Yemen. Raba'al-Abs had a population of 10229 according to the 2004 census.
