= Al-Raba al-Sharqi =

Al-Raba al-Sharqi الربع الشرقي
- Sub-district
- Location in Yemen
- Coordinates: 15.15609°N 44.34283°E
- Country: Yemen
- Governorate: Sana'a
- District: Bilad Ar Rus

Population (2004)
  - Total: 7,726
- Time zone: UTC+3

Al-Raba al-Sharqi (Arabic: الربع الشرقي) is a sub-district located in Bilad Ar Rus District, Sana'a Governorate, Yemen. Al-Raba al-Sharqi had a population of 7726 according to the 2004 census.
