= Raba' Awlad Hassan =

Raba' Awlad Hassan ربع أولاد حسن
- Sub-district
- Location in Yemen
- Coordinates: 15°04′22″N 44°12′00″E
- Country: Yemen
- Governorate: Sana'a
- District: Bilad Ar Rus

Population (2004)
  - Total: 4,711
- Time zone: UTC+3

Raba' Awlad Hassan (Arabic: ربع أولاد حسن) is a sub-district located in Bilad Ar Rus District, Sana'a Governorate, Yemen. Raba' Awlad Hassan had a population of 4711 according to the 2004 census.
