= Al-Yamanyah al-Allya =

Al-Yamanyah al-Allya اليمانية العليا
- Sub-district
- Location in Yemen
- Coordinates: 15°01′35″N 44°28′48″E
- Country: Yemen
- Governorate: Sana'a
- District: Al Husn

Population (2004)
  - Total: 30,124
- Time zone: UTC+3

Al-Yamanyah al-Allya (Arabic: اليمانية العليا) is a sub-district located in Al Husn District, Sana'a Governorate, Yemen. Al-Yamanyah al-Allya had a population of 30124 according to the 2004 census.
