= Baniswar =

Baniswar بنيسوار
- Sub-district
- Location in Yemen
- Country: Yemen
- Governorate: Sana'a
- District: Bani Matar

Population (2004)
  - Total: 3,129
- Time zone: UTC+3

Baniswar (Arabic: بنيسوار) is a sub-district located in Bani Matar District, Sana'a Governorate, Yemen. Baniswar had a population of 3129 according to the 2004 census.
