= Hadhar =

Hadhar حضر
- Sub-district
- Location in Yemen
- Country: Yemen
- Governorate: Sana'a
- District: Jihanah

Population (2004)
  - Total: 9,017
- Time zone: UTC+3

Hadhar (Arabic: حضر) is a sub-district located in Jihanah District, Sana'a Governorate, Yemen. Hadhar had a population of 9017 according to the 2004 census.
