= Sahman Jihanah =

Sahman Jihanah سهمان جحانة
- Sub-district
- Country: Yemen
- Governorate: Sana'a
- District: Jihanah

Population (2004)
  - Total: 3,258
- Time zone: UTC+3

Sahman Jihanah (Arabic: سهمان جحانة) is a sub-district located in Jihanah District, Sana'a Governorate, Yemen. Sahman Jihanah had a population of 3258 according to the 2004 census.
