= Diyan (Sanaa) =

Diyan ديان
- Sub-district
- Location in Yemen
- Coordinates: 15.17832°N 44.19137°E
- Country: Yemen
- Governorate: Sana'a
- District: Bani Matar

Population (2004)
  - Total: 6,792
- Time zone: UTC+3

Diyan (Arabic: ديان) is a sub-district located in Bani Matar District, Sana'a Governorate, Yemen. Diyan had a population of 6792 according to the 2004 census.
