= Shihab al-Asfal =

Shihab al-Asfal شهاب الاسفل
- Sub-district
- Location in Yemen
- Coordinates: 15.29974°N 44.08605°E
- Country: Yemen
- Governorate: Sana'a
- District: Bani Matar

Population (2004)
  - Total: 15,045
- Time zone: UTC+3

Shihab al-Asfal (Arabic: شهاب الاسفل) is a sub-district located in Bani Matar District, Sana'a Governorate, Yemen. Shihab al-Asfal had a population of 15045 according to the 2004 census.
