= Wa'alan =

Wa'alan وعلان
- Sub-district
- Location of Wa'alan in Yemen
- Coordinates: 15.06786°N 44.27573°E
- Country: Yemen
- Governorate: Sana'a
- District: Bilad Ar Rus

Population (2004)
  - Total: 8,526
- Time zone: UTC+3

Wa'alan (Arabic: وعلان) is a sub-district located in Bilad Ar Rus District, Sana'a Governorate, Yemen. 8526 people were counted in the population of Wa'alan in the 2004 census.
