= Janab (Sanaa) =

Janab جنب
- Sub-district
- Location in Yemen
- Country: Yemen
- Governorate: Sana'a
- District: Bani Matar

Population (2004)
  - Total: 10,338
- Time zone: UTC+3

Janab (Arabic: جنب) is a sub-district located in Bani Matar District, Sana'a Governorate, Yemen. Janab had a population of 10338 according to the 2004 census.
