= Abdallah Bin Essa Al Kawkabani =

- Born: January 1762; Kawkaban
- Died: December 1809 (46–47 years old); Kawkaban
- Occupation(s): Muslim Scholar, Poet, Prosecutor, and Writer.

Al-Sayyid Abdallah Bin Issa Bin Muhammad Al-Hasani Al-Kawkabani Arabic:(عبدالله بن عيسى الكوكباني ) (January 1762 - December 1809) (Rajab 1175 - Dhul Qi’dah 1224) was a Zaidi jurist, poet and Yemeni prose. He was born in Kawkaban and grew up there in a family of Hashemite descent, and he is a descendant of Yahya Sharaf al-Din. Taken from a group of scholars, including his father and Abdul Qadir bin Ahmed. He excelled in several arts, such as hadith, literature, and machine science. Several legal investigations took place between him and Muhammad bin Ali al-Shawkani. He has many books on various topics. He died in his hometown at the age of 47.

== Biography ==
He is Abu Ali Fakhr al-Din Abdullah bin Issa bin Muhammad bin Al Hussein bin Abdul Qadir bin Nasser bin Abd al-Rab bin Ali bin Shams al-Din bin Yahya Sharaf al-Din, al-Hasani al-Kawkabani. He was born in Rajab 1175/January 1762 in Kawkaban and was raised there. He memorized the Qur’an on Muhammad bin Salih al-Basir, and he memorized many books in jurisprudence and language, and he took it from Yahya bin Salih al-Shahari and read it to his father. He excelled in modern science, literature, and machine science. He has many letters and reviews in jurisprudence with Muhammad bin Ali Al-Shawkani.

He has many books, and a collection of his systems. He died in his hometown of Dhul-Qa'dah 1224/December 1809.

== Publications ==
“Send the article to Solve the Problem,” ( Original title: Iirsal almaqal 'iilaa al'iishkal ) in which he replied to Al-Shawkani's message to solve the problem.

«The sunrise in the absence of reverence for overtaking a rak`ah of the Friday prayer» ( Original title: Iishraq altaleat fi eadam alaietidad bi'iidarik rakeatan min aljumeati ).

“Removing the niche from the hadiths of zakat.” ( Original title: Iizalat almushkat ean 'ahadith alzakati ).

“Rayhan Al-Rouh in Dictating the Merits of the Lord Al-Ruh”, ( Original title: Rihan alruwh fi 'iimla' mahasin almawlaa alruwhi ) translated by his father.

“The Arrest of Al-Nasal on Tawfiq Al-Nibal,” ( Original title: Tawqif alnisal ealaa tawfiq alnabal ) in which he responded to Al-Shawkani's response to his letter, sending the article

“The gardens that rise from the flowers of the sons of the age are shakim” or “the gardens of antiques for those who wear the garb of literature and antiques”,( Original title: <<Alhadayiq almutalaeat min zuhur 'iibna' aleasr shaqayiqa>> 'aw <<hadayiq altuhaf fiman taradaa birida' aladb waltahafu ) translations of the poets of his time.

“Take off excuses in the basil of excuses,” ( Original title: Khalae aleadhaar fi rayhan aleadhar )a collection of poetry.

“A good shot at Hashid al-Sayyid.” ( Original title: Altaswib aljayid ealaa hashid alsayid ).

“Consolation and Manna in Not Expulsion of the Jews from Yemen” ( Original title: Alsalwaa walmin fi eadam 'iikhraj alyahud min alyaman ).

"Gossip of al-Khater in the translation of Muhammad ibn al-Husayn ibn Abd al-Qadir" ( Original title: Nimamat alkhatir fi tarjamat Muhamad bin alhusayn bin eabd alqadir ).

"Drawing lots in a conditional Friday" ( Original title: Darb alqureat fi shurtiat aljumeati ).

«Suffixes on Gardens» ( Original title: Allawahiq alaa alhadayiqi ).

A literary group in which he collected his poetry and prose.

“The Indian Sword in the Way of Sheikh Najdi,” ( Original title: Alsayf alhindiu fi 'iianat tariq alshaykh alnajdi ) completed in 1218, in response to Wahhabi Salafism.

“A message regarding the prohibition of zakat on Bani Hashim.” ( Original title: Risalat fi tahrim alzakat ealaa bani hashim )
