= Bayt Hanbas =

Bayt Hanbas بيت حنبص
- Village
- Location in Yemen
- Coordinates: 15.26496°N 44.14561°E
- Country: Yemen
- Governorate: Sanaa
- District: Bani Matar
- Elevation: 9,245 ft (2,818 m)
- Time zone: UTC+3 (Yemen Standard Time)

Bayt Hanbas (Arabic: بيت حنبص Bayt Ḩanbaş) is a village in Bani Matar District of Sanaa Governorate, Yemen. It is located above the Qa al-Nahim plain, in the mountains southwest of Sanaa.

== History ==
According to the 10th-century writer al-Hamdani, Bayt Hanbas is named after one Ḥanbaṣ b. Yuʽfir Dhī Yahar, of the tribe of Himyar. Al-Hamdani described Bayt Hanbas as once having been the site of at least one great palace, which had been destroyed by the Qarmatians in 908 CE (295 AH). No traces of the palace exist today. Later, during the 13th and 14th centuries, Bayt Hanbas served as a minor stronghold of the Banu Shihab tribe.
