= Al Husn district =

Al Husn District
- District
- Location in Yemen
- Coordinates: 15.0206°N 44.5042°E
- Country: Yemen
- Governorate: Sana'a

Population (2003)
  - Total: 30,124
- Time zone: UTC+3 (Yemen Standard Time)

Al Husn District (Arabic: مديرية الحصن) is a district of the Sana'a Governorate, Yemen. As of 2003, the district had a population of 30,124 inhabitants.
