= Jabal Haraz =

Mountain range in Yemen

Coordinates: 15.1667°N 43.7500°E

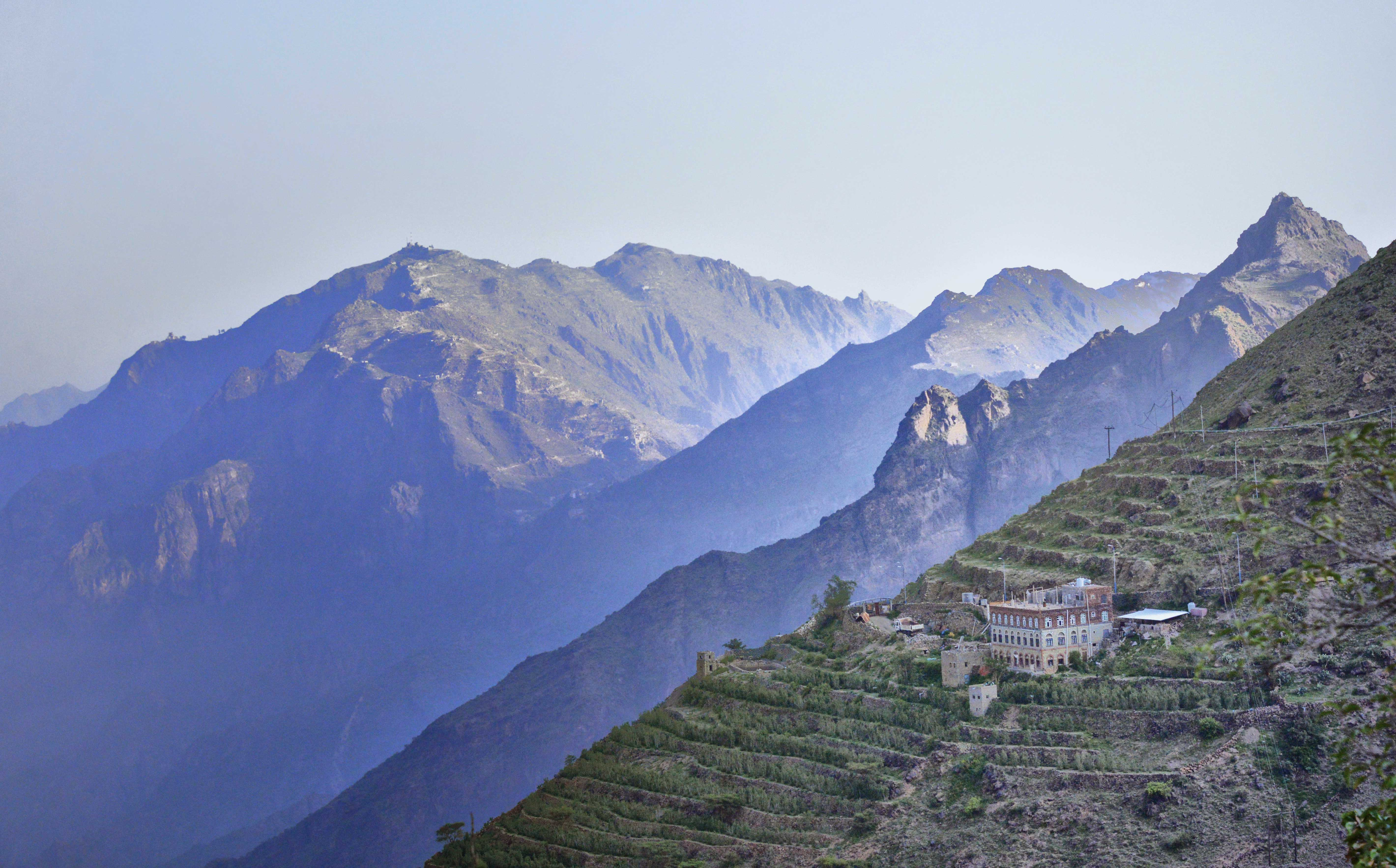
- A building with terraces overlooks the side of one of the Haraz Mountains

Highest point
- Elevation: 3,000 m (9,800 ft)

Naming
- Native name: Jabal Ḥarāz (جَبَل حَرَاز)

Geography
- Location within Yemen Location within Middle East Location within Asia
- Country: Yemen
- Region: South Arabia

UNESCO World Heritage Site
- Official name: Jabal Haraz
- Criteria: Mixed
- Designated: 2002 (43rd session)
- Reference no.: 1722
- Region: Arab States

Jabal Haraz (Arabic: جَبَل حَرَاز, romanized: Jabal Ḥarāz) is a mountainous region of Yemen, between Sanaa and Al-Hudaydah, which is considered to be within the Sarat range. In the 11th century, it was the stronghold of the Sulaihid dynasty, many of whose buildings still survive today. It includes Jabal An-Nabi Shu'ayb, the highest mountain in Yemen and the Arabian Peninsula.

== World Heritage Status ==
This area was added to the UNESCO World Heritage Tentative List on July 8, 2002, by the State Party of Yemen in the mixed (cultural and natural) category, as a site that has "outstanding universal value". The site has not yet been voted by the World Heritage Committee as an official World Heritage site.

== Gallery ==
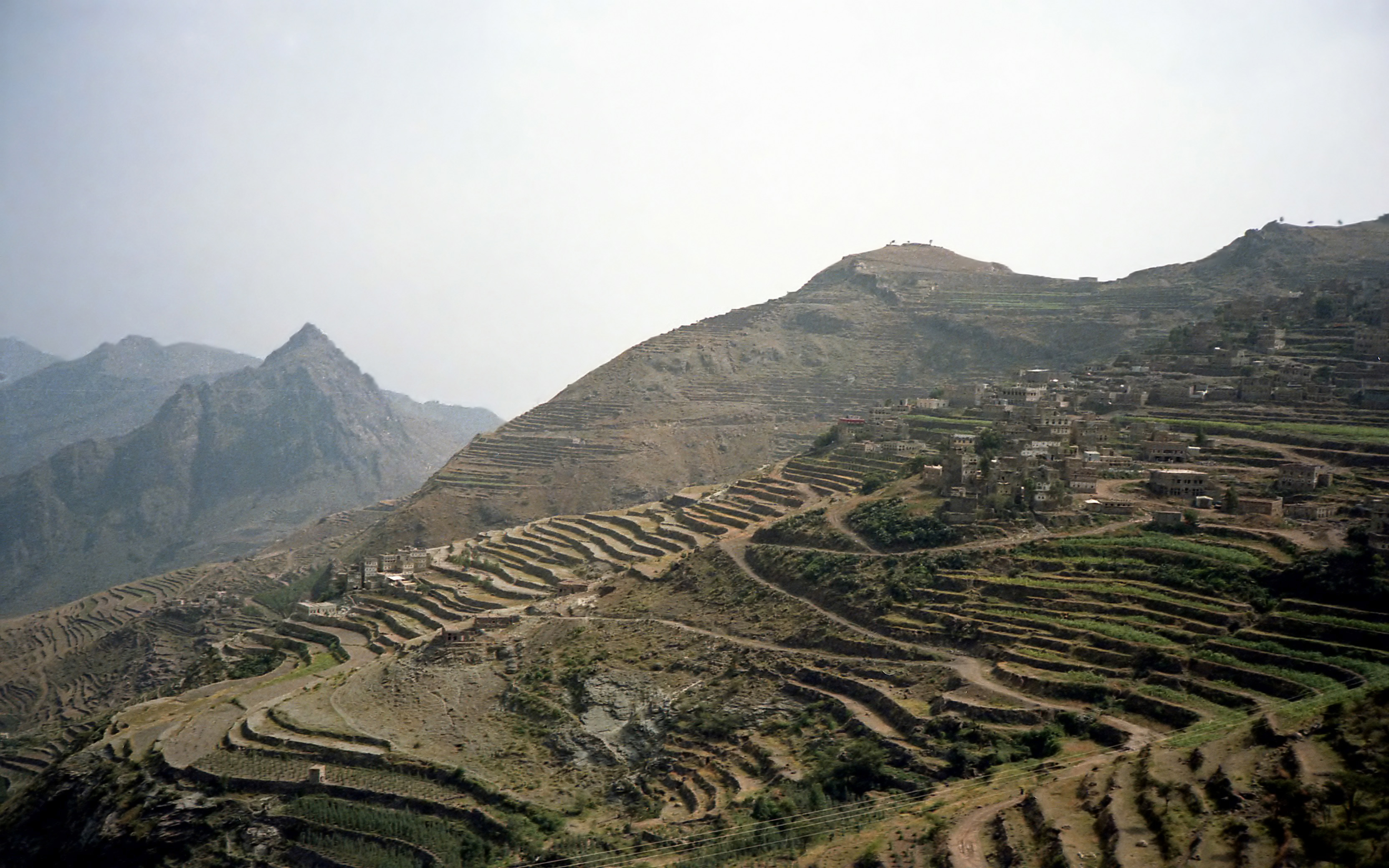
Manakhah in Sanaa Governorate

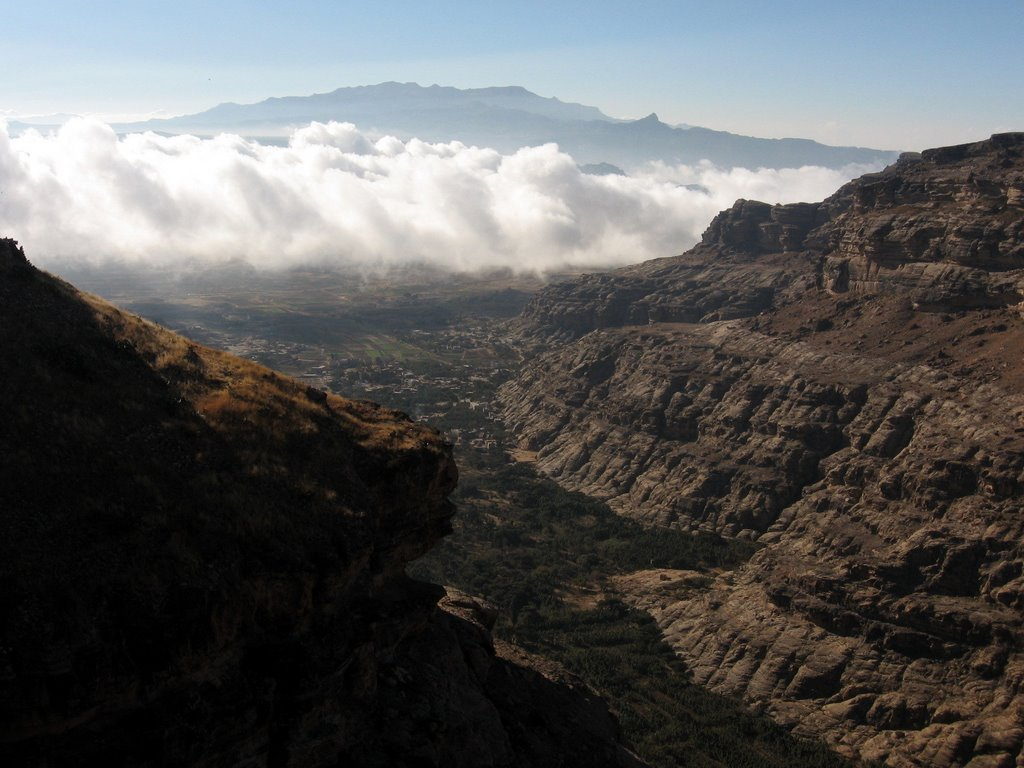
Jabal An-Nabi Shu'ayb, the highest mountain and peak in the Arabian Peninsula, as viewed from Kawkaban, Al Mahwit Governorate

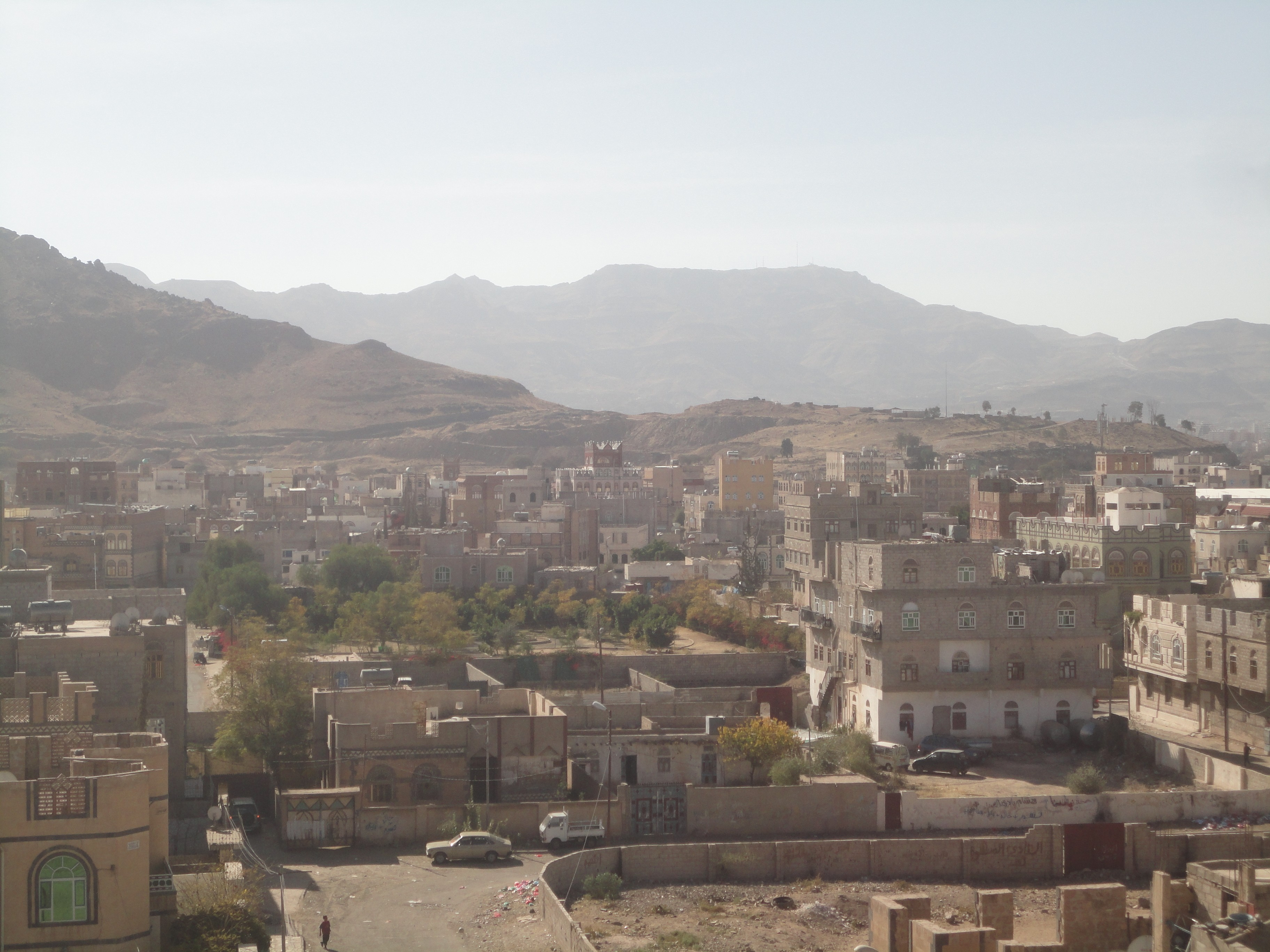
Jabal An-Nabi Shu'ayb is behind the mountain in the background, facing west of southern Sanaa City

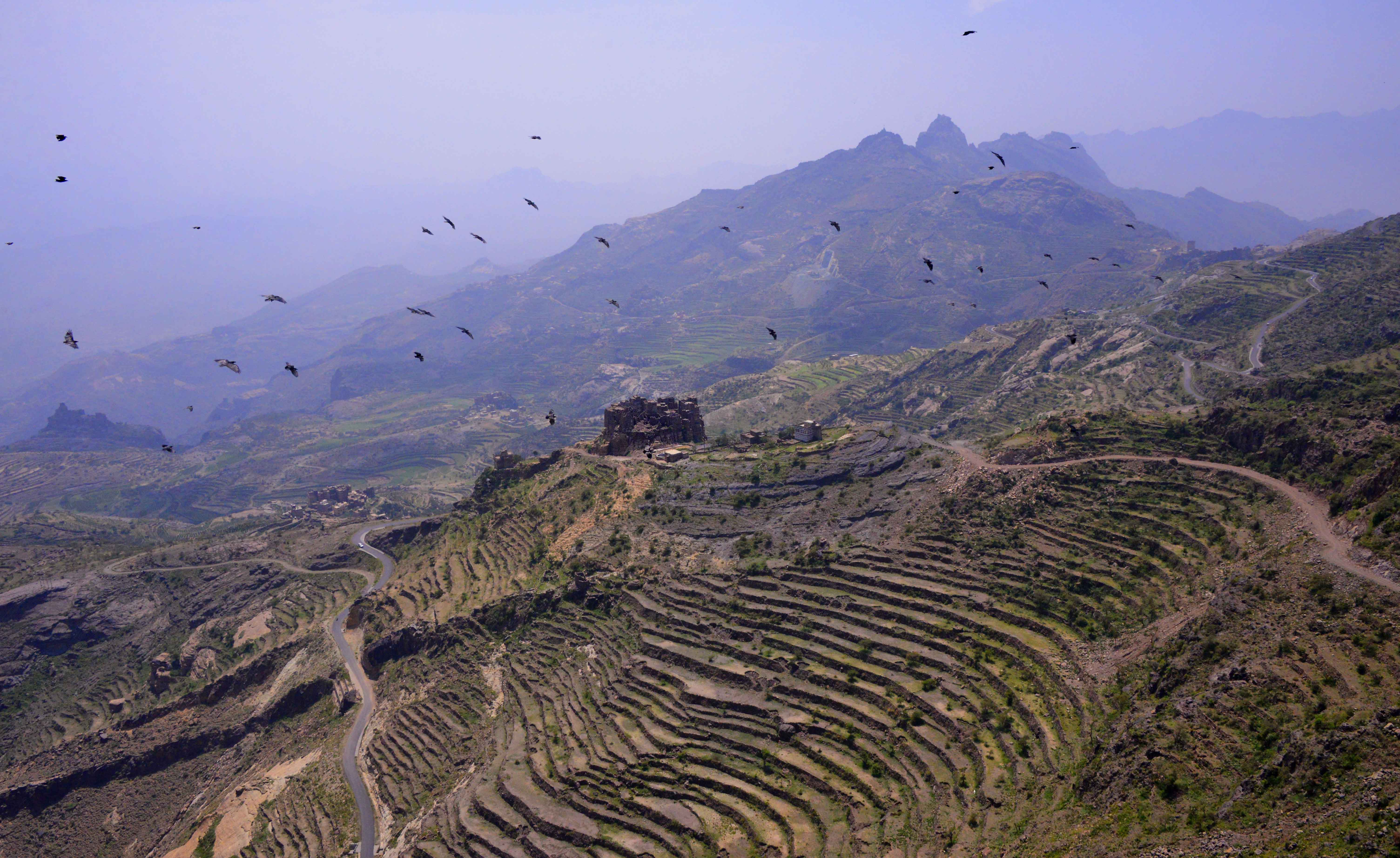
Terraces

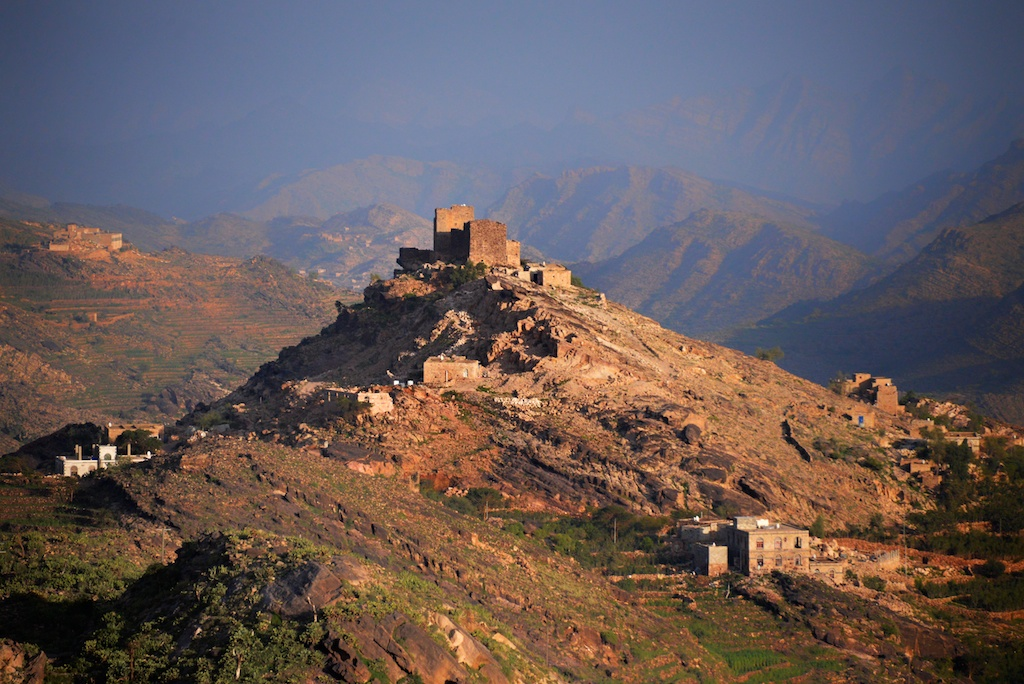
Fortified settlement amid the mountains

== See also ==
- Ad Dahrah, located in the Haraz, the stronghold of the Sulaihid dynasty, many of whose buildings still survive to this day
- Geology of Yemen
- Hajhir Mountains
- Middle East
- Near East
