= Shibam Kawkaban =

Shibam Kawkaban شبام كَوْكَبَان
- Town
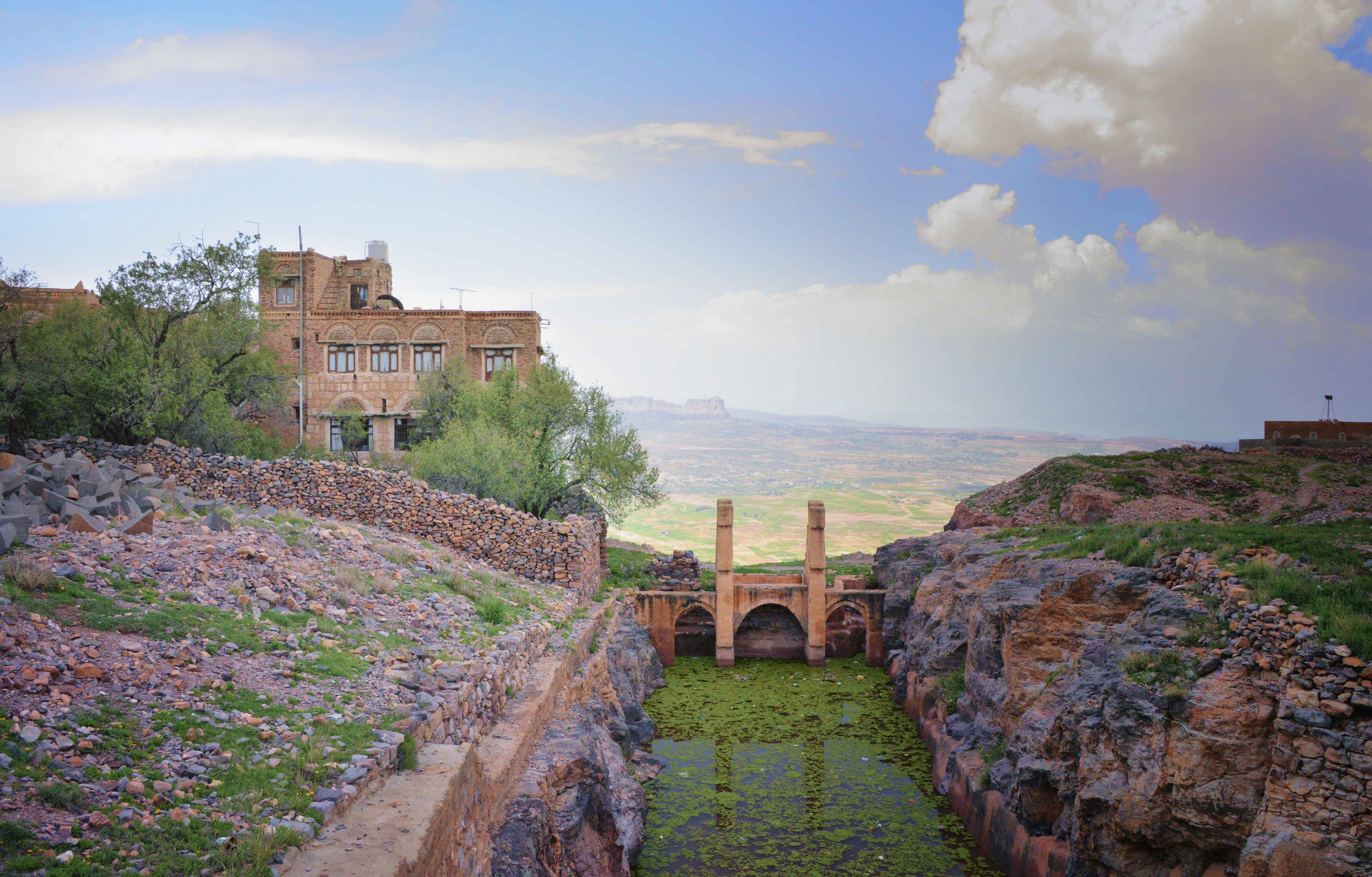
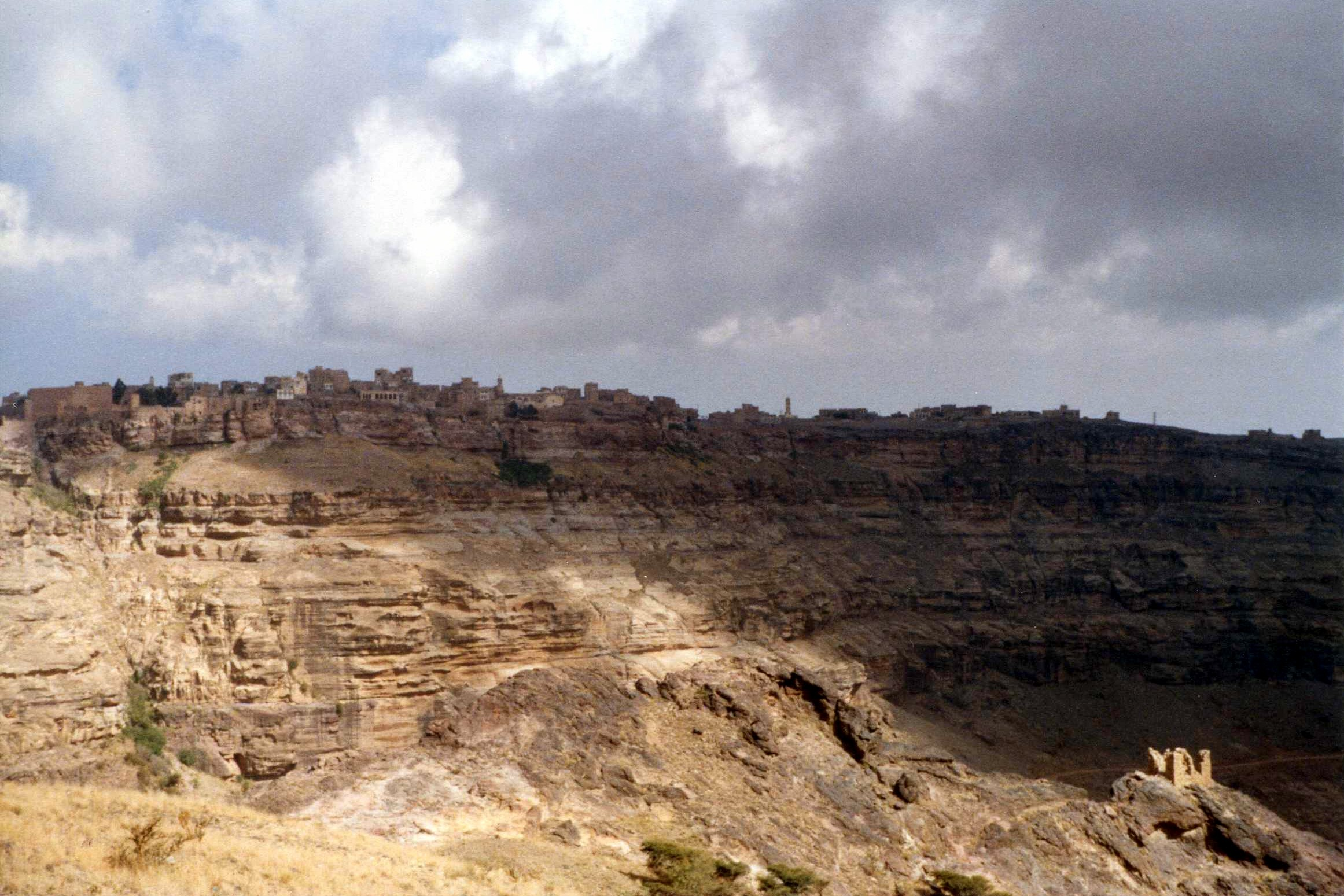
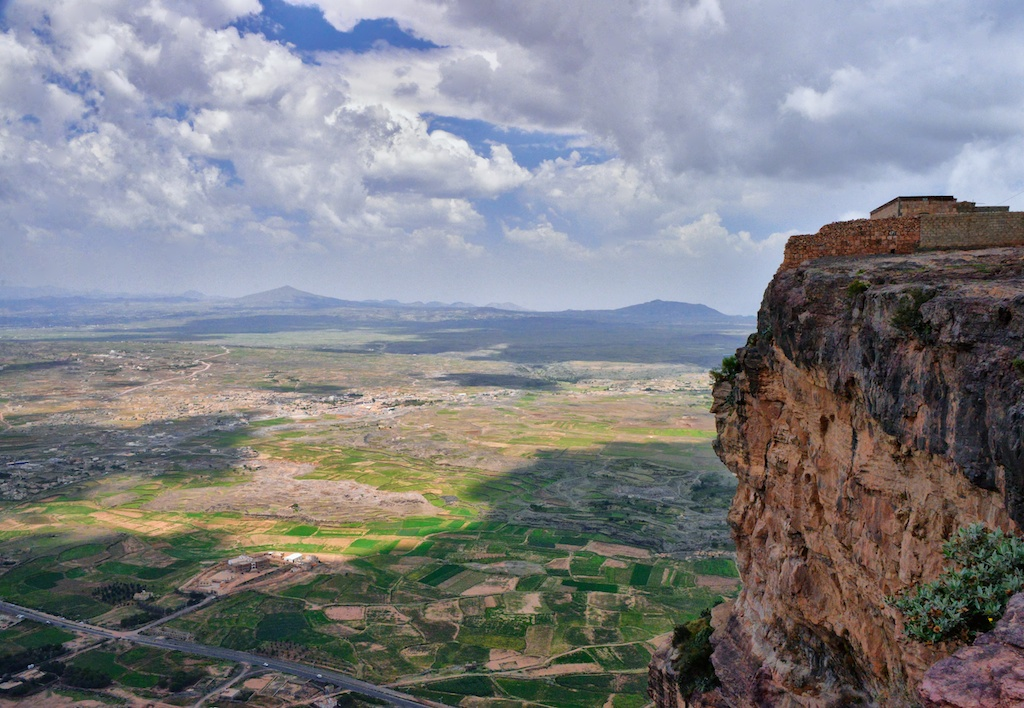
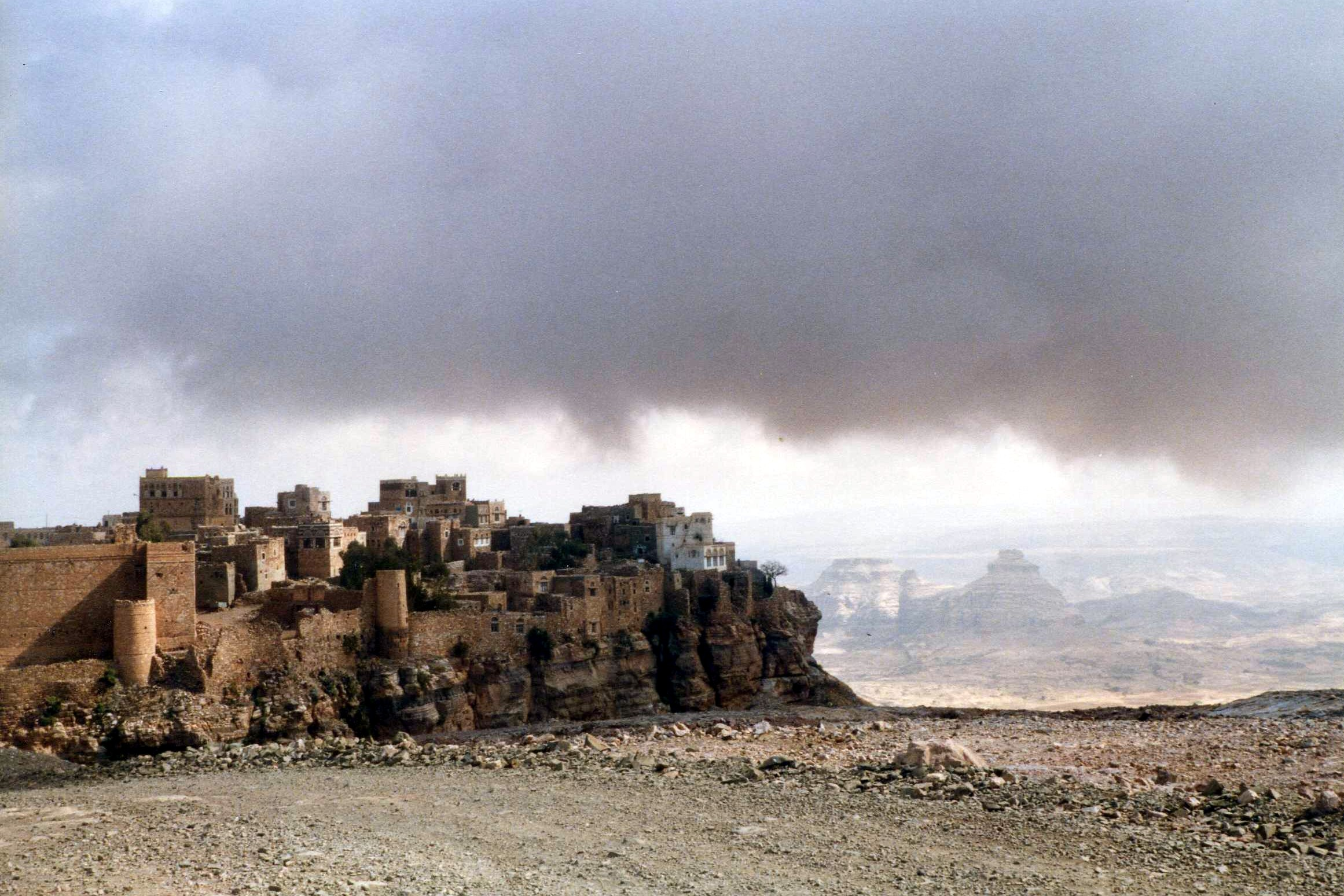

- Location in Yemen
- Coordinates: 15°30′N 43°54′E
- Country: Yemen
- Governorate: Al Mahwit Governorate
- Time zone: UTC+3 (Yemen Standard Time)

Shibam Kawkaban (Arabic: شبام كَوْكَبَان, romanized: Shibām Kawkabān) (Note: The name is variously spelled "Shibam Kawkaban", with a space; "Shibam-Kawkaban", with a dash; or even "Shibam (Kawkaban)", with parentheses.) is a double town in Shibam Kawkaban District, Al Mahwit Governorate, Yemen, located 38 km west-northwest of Sanaa, the national capital. It consists of two distinct adjoining towns, Shibam (Arabic: شبام, romanized: Shibām) and Kawkaban (Arabic: كَوْكَبَان, romanized: Kawkabān). Shibam is sometimes also called "Shibam Kawkaban" in order to distinguish it from other towns called Shibam.

Shibam is a market town at the edge of a large agricultural plain; above it is the fortress-town of Kawkaban, at the summit of the cliffs to the southwest. Kawkaban, which means "two planets" in Arabic, is a sizeable town in its own right, and is known for its lavish tower-houses. Because of the fertile surrounding farmland, the defensive strength of the Kawkaban fortress, and the city's closeness to Sanaa, Shibam Kawkaban has been strategically important throughout Yemen's history.

It contains a fortified citadel about 2,931 m (9,616 ft) above sea level. It is built upon a precipitous hilltop, walled from the north and fortified naturally from the other directions. It was the capital of the Yuʿfirid dynasty (847-997), and was also home to a Jewish community until its demise in the mid-20th century. The city affords good views of the surrounding countryside.

The city features several old mosques: al Madrasa, al Mansoor, al Sharefa and Harabat. The old market is in the middle of the city. Old rainwater reservoirs can also be seen in the fortified town, named Meseda, Alasdad, and Sedalhamam.

== Names ==
According to the 10th-century writer Abu Muhammad al-Hasan al-Hamdani, there were four towns in Yemen named Shibam. To distinguish this Shibam from the others, it is sometimes suffixed as Shibam Kawkaban. Other historically used epithets include Shibam Aqyan, Shibam Ḥimyar, Shibam Yaḥbus, and Shibam Yuʿfir. According to al-Hamdani, the town had originally been called Yuḥbis, and had taken the name "Shibam" after a man of the Banu Hamdan tribe who had settled there. (Note: His full genealogy is given as Shibam b. Abdullah b. As'ad b. Jusham b. Hashid.) (Note: The name Yuhbis now refers to a wadi to the west of Shibam, descending from below the historical fort of Bukur and eventually joining the Wadi La'ah.) As for the name "Aqyan", it comes from the name of the Banu Dhu Kabir Aqyan dynasty which ruled the surrounding area in pre-Islamic times.

The name Shibām, which is somewhat common in Yemen, appears to refer to a peak or other elevated place. Landberg's Glossaire datînois records that in the Dathina region, there are words shabama (meaning "to be high") and shibām (meaning "height"). The places named Shibam are all located by peaks or cliffs, so the name is an appropriate one.

As for Kawkaban, al-Hamdani says it is named after a man named Kawkaban b. Dhi Sabal b. Aqyan, of the tribe of Himyar, but Robert T.O. Wilson says this eponym is "probably contrived". Wilson notes that al-Hamdani did mention another place called Kawkaban, which he said got its name "because it was adorned with silver bands."

== History ==
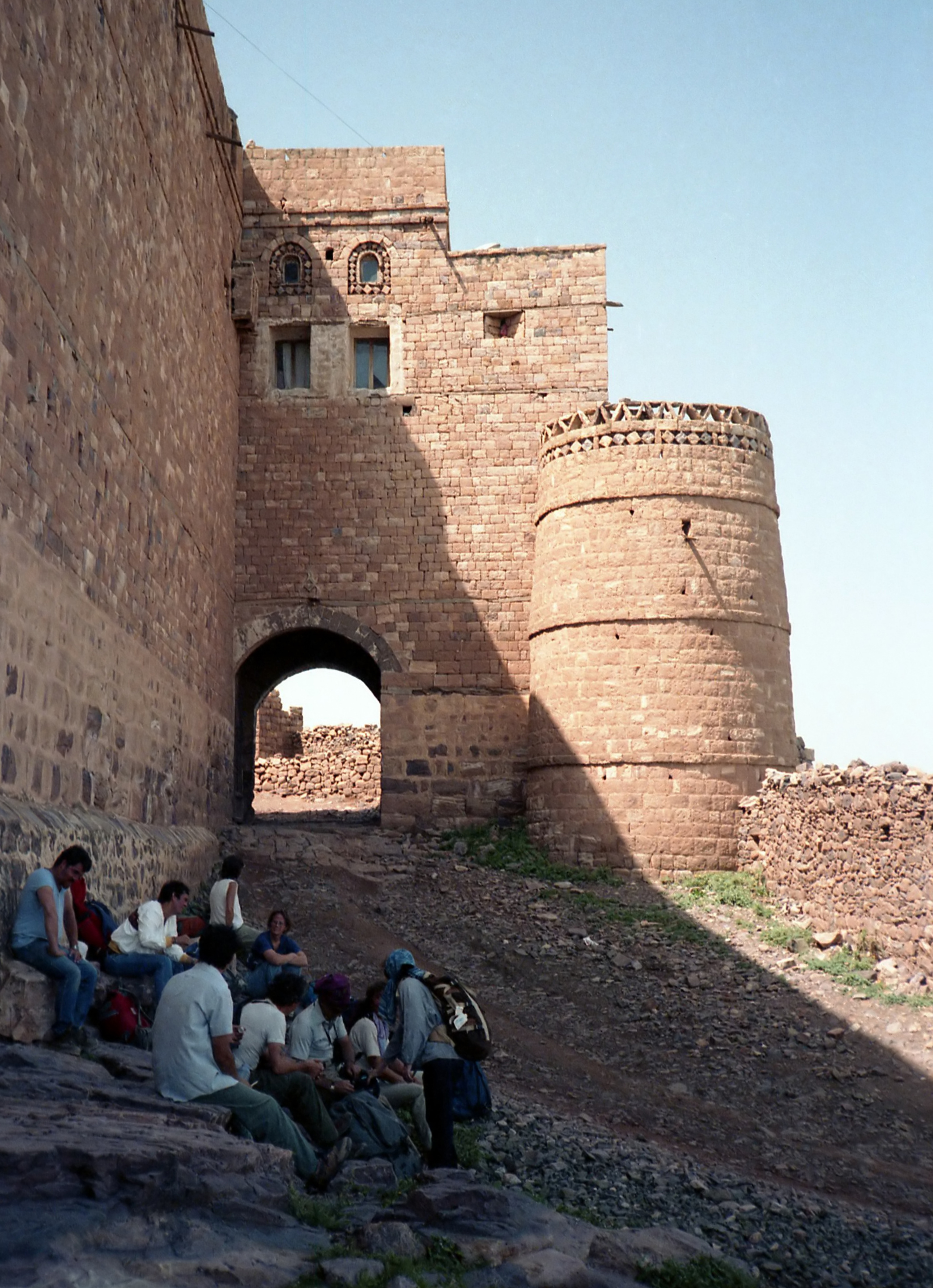
Kawkaban Gate

The earliest mentions of Shibam Kawkaban are in 3rd-century inscriptions which identify it as the center of the Dhu Hagaran Shibam tribe.

The town is known as Shibam Kawkaban because it is on a mountain called Kawkaban. It was also known as Shibam Yaḥbis, Shibam Ḥimyar and Shibam Aqyan. The Yuʿfirids Muslim dynasty (847-997) that emerged in the Yemen is originally from Shibam Kawkaban. Shibam Kawkaban became their capital.

According to al-Hamdani, Shibam was the center of the historical mikhlaf of 'Aqyan. He wrote that the town had 30 mosques in his day and was inhabited by members of the Banu Fahd branch of the tribe of Himyar.

Beginning in the 1500s, Shibam Kawkaban was a stronghold of the Alid Sharaf al-Din dynasty, which produced two Zaydi Imams of Yemen.

In the early 20th century, the mountain village was visited by German explorer and photographer Hermann Burchardt, who wrote in May 1902: "Kawkaban, a now completely deserted town that still 40 years ago counted 30,000 inhabitants, but now hardly holds a few hundred; [it] also has its Jewish quarter, where still some families live." The renowned Jewish poet, Zechariah Dhahiri, was a resident of the city.

As of the 1975 census, Shibam Kawkaban was home to about 2,000 people.

In February 2016 as part of the Yemeni Civil War, fighter jets from U.S.-backed, Saudi-led coalition struck the town citadel, killing seven residents and destroying the historic gateway as well as the 700-year-old houses.

== Climate ==
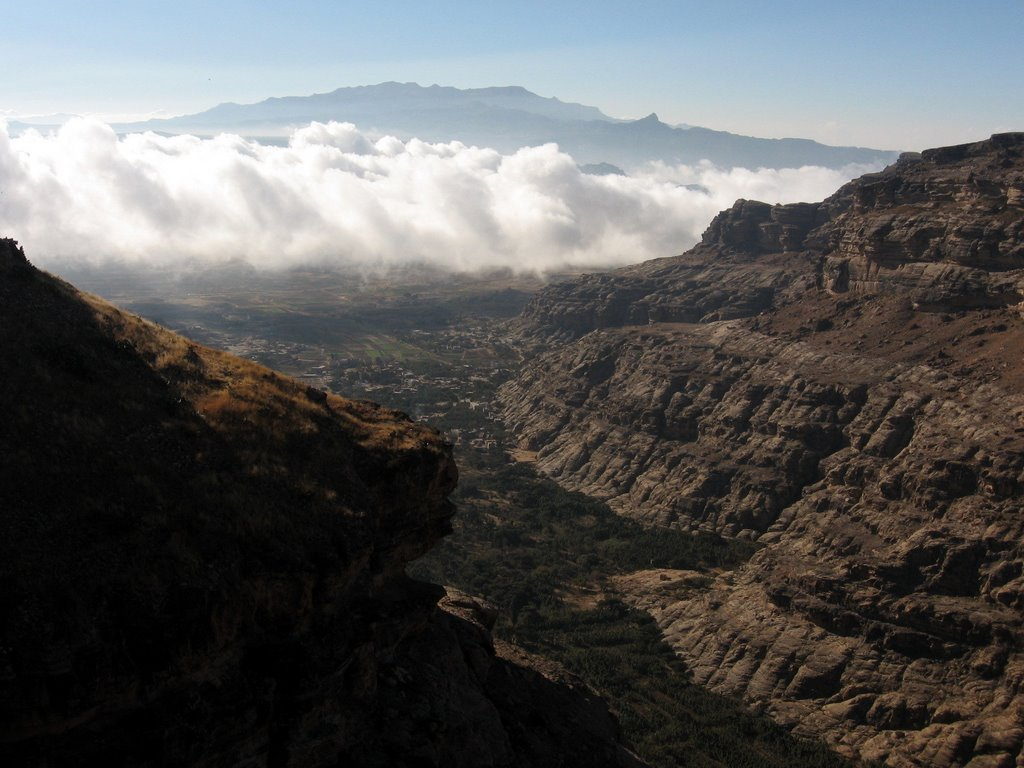
The highest mountain in the Arabian Peninsula, Jabal An-Nabi Shu'ayb of the Haraz-Sarat Mountains, as viewed from Kawkaban

Kawkaban has a distinct moderate semi-arid climate under the Köppen climate classification (BSh). Due to its outstanding elevation that nears 3,000 m (9,800 ft), the town receives larger diurnal ranges and more precipitation compared to the nearby capital, Sanaa. The higher but still modest precipitation is a direct result of its exposed location (it is not shielded by any natural barriers) on top of a mountain and its rugged terrain; both factors leading to occasional orographic lifts rising from nearby slopes.

Climate data for Kawkaban
Month	Jan	Feb	Mar	Apr	May	Jun	Jul	Aug	Sep	Oct	Nov	Dec	Year
Mean daily maximum °C (°F)	22.2 (72.0)	23.3 (73.9)	25.5 (77.9)	26.3 (79.3)	28.3 (82.9)	30.0 (86.0)	28.5 (83.3)	27.2 (81.0)	27.3 (81.1)	26.2 (79.2)	23.5 (74.3)	22.2 (72.0)	25.6 (78.1)
Daily mean °C (°F)	14.0 (57.2)	14.9 (58.8)	17.3 (63.1)	18.7 (65.7)	20.6 (69.1)	21.9 (71.4)	22.1 (71.8)	20.9 (69.6)	20.2 (68.4)	18.5 (65.3)	16.3 (61.3)	14.7 (58.5)	18.3 (64.9)
Mean daily minimum °C (°F)	5.9 (42.6)	6.5 (43.7)	9.2 (48.6)	11.1 (52.0)	13.0 (55.4)	13.8 (56.8)	15.7 (60.3)	14.7 (58.5)	13.1 (55.6)	10.9 (51.6)	9.1 (48.4)	7.2 (45.0)	10.9 (51.6)
Average precipitation mm (inches)	7 (0.3)	8 (0.3)	15 (0.6)	38 (1.5)	46 (1.8)	17 (0.7)	82 (3.2)	112 (4.4)	41 (1.6)	8 (0.3)	6 (0.2)	1 (0.0)	381 (14.9)
Source: Climate-Data.org

== See also ==
- Shibam Hadramawt
