= Jabal An-Nabi Shu'ayb =

Highest mountain in the Arabian Peninsula

Jabal An-Nabī Shuʿayb جَبَل ٱلنَّبِي شُعَيْب
- Jabal Hadhur / Jabal Ḥaḍūr جَبَل حَضُوْر
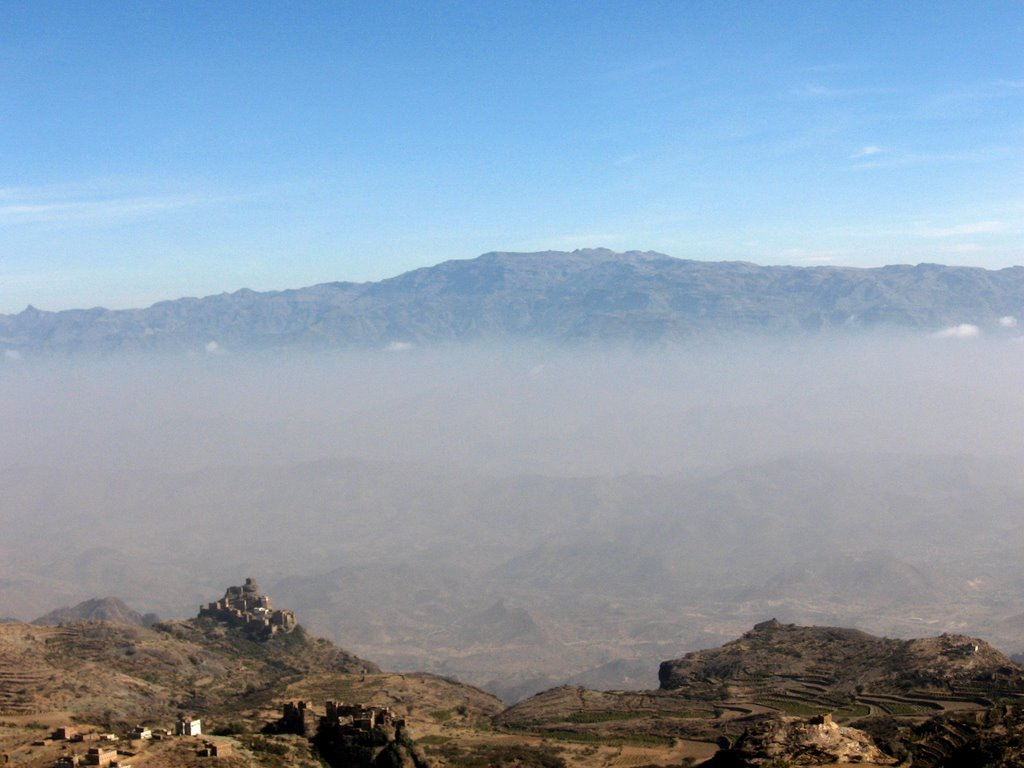
- Jabal An-Nabi Shu'ayb, a peak in the Haraz Mountains, near Sanaa in Yemen

Highest point
- Elevation: 3,666 m (12,028 ft)
- Prominence: 3,311 m (10,863 ft); Ranked 62nd
- Listing: Country high point Ultra, Ribu
- Coordinates: 15°16′45″N 43°58′33″E

Geography
- Location within Yemen Location within Middle East Location within West and Central Asia
- Location: Sanaa Governorate, Yemen
- Parent range: Haraz-Sarawat Mountains

Jabal An-Nabī Shuʿayb (Arabic: جَبَل ٱلنَّبِي شُعَيْب, lit. 'Mountain of the Prophet Shuaib'), also called Jabal Hadhur (Arabic: جَبَل حَضُوْر, romanized: Jabal Ḥaḍūr), is a 3,666 meter high mountain in the Harazi subregion of the Sarawat, located in Bani Matar District, Sanaa Governorate, Yemen. It is the highest mountain in the country and the Arabian Peninsula. It is the 62nd most prominent peak in the world, and the third most prominent in the Middle East.

== Name ==
The mountain is named after a prophet called Shuʿayb ibn Mahdam ibn Dhī-Mahdam al-Ḥaḍūrī (شُعَيْب ابْن مَهْدَم ابْن ذِي مَهْدَم ٱلْحَضُوْرِي). According to Islamic scholars, he is different from Shuaib of Midian. According to Al-Hamdani, he was sent to the people of Mikhlaf Hadhur, but they killed him, and God sent Bakht Nasr, who destroyed their town. Locals believe that his tomb is on the mountain. The mountain is also called Jabal Hadhur because it is located in the region of Mikhlaf Hadhur.

== Description ==
The height of the mountain is 3,666 metres (12,028 ft). Although its elevation is often reported to be 3,760 metres (12,340 feet), this is not supported by SRTM data or more recent cartographic sources. The mountain is located near the Yemeni capital city of Sanaa, and rises from about 1,500–1,600 m (4,900–5,200 ft). The western side of the mountain blocks rain clouds, a rain shadow effect causing that side to be relatively fertile. Atop the mountain is a military post with radar, as well as the purported shrine to Shuaib.

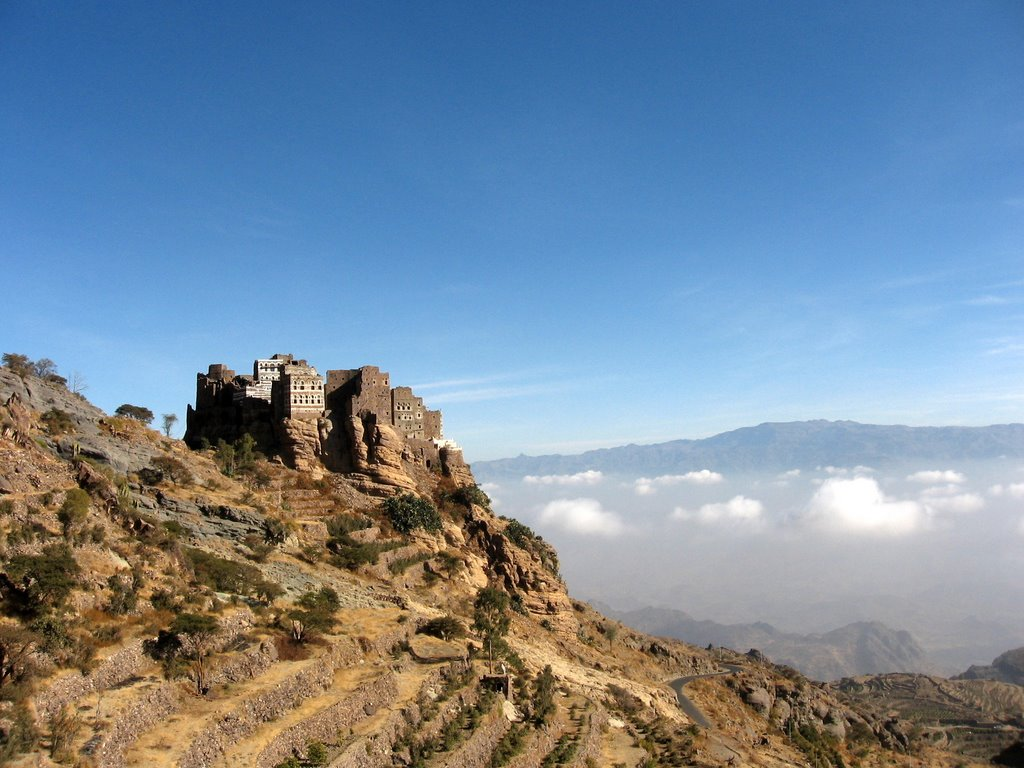
The mountain (background) as viewed from the terraced side of mountain at Al Mahwit Governorate

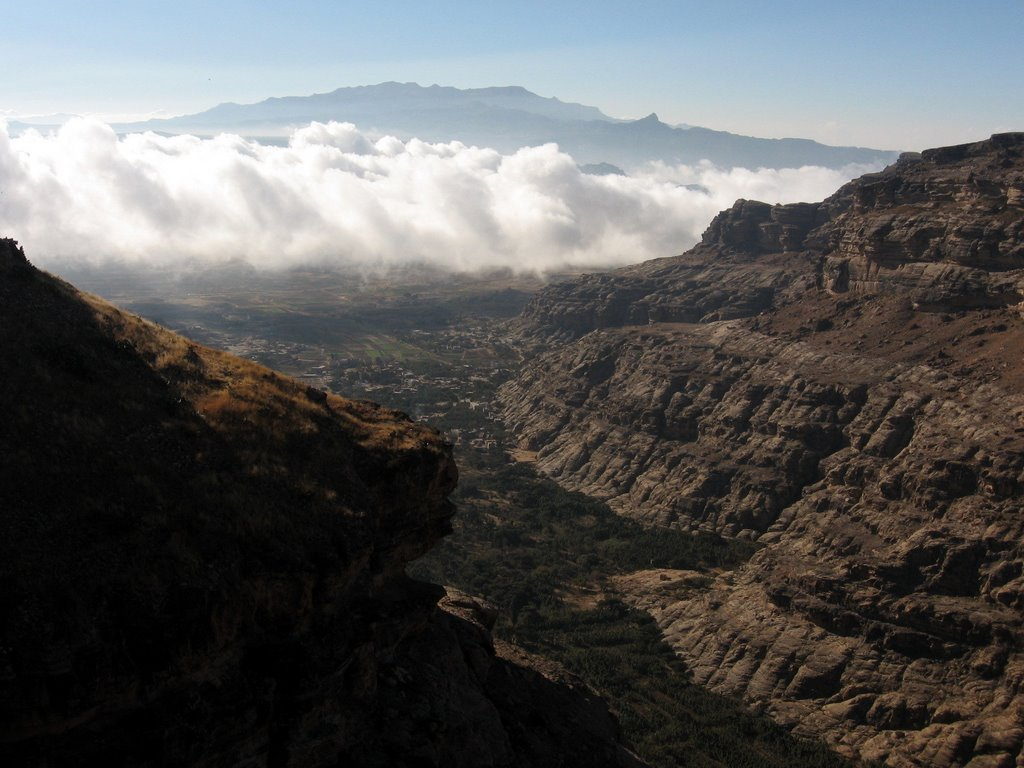
As viewed from Kawkaban in Al-Mahwit Governorate

=== Climbing ===
Although the summit is not snow-capped like its counterparts in northern Lebanon and Syria, there have been reports of snow on the peak and frost in the winter. Wind speeds are very high at the summit. In April 2019, Ahmad Zein Al-Yafei, an Emirati security officer from Dubai, claimed that he scaled the mountain in 69 hours, unfurling the banner of the Dubai Police at the peak.

=== Geology ===
The mountain is a prominent part of the tertiary volcanic series, which builds up large parts of the Yemeni highlands. Its rocks were sampled, analyzed and studied in detail by the German mineralogist Dieter R. Fuchs. He elaborated in depth the geochemistry and petrogenetic properties and elaborated a thesis on the formation of this geological series.

== See also ==
- List of ultras of West Asia
- South Arabia
  - Geography of Yemen
  - Geology of Yemen
