= Bilad Ar Rus district =

Coordinates: 15.0350°N 44.2514°E

Bilad Ar Rus District بلاد الروس
- District
- Interactive map of Bilad Ar Rus District
- Country: Yemen
- Governorate: Sana'a

Population (2003)
  - Total: 31,259
- Time zone: UTC+3 (Yemen Standard Time)

Bilad Ar Rus District (Arabic: بلاد الروس) is a district of the Sana'a Governorate, Yemen. As of 2003, the district had a population of 31,259 inhabitants.

== Uzal (sub-district) ==
There are four 'Uzal (sub-district) in the district:

- 'Uzlat Waʽlan
- Rubu' awlad Hasan
- Alrubu' al-Sharqi (Eastern Quarter)
- Rubu' al-'abs
