= Jihanah district =

Coordinates: 15.1917°N 44.5194°E

Jihanah District
- District
- Interactive map of Jihanah District
- Country: Yemen
- Governorate: Sana'a

Population (2003)
  - Total: 50,747
- Time zone: UTC+3 (Yemen Standard Time)

Jihanah District (Arabic: مديرية جحانة) is a district of the Sana'a Governorate, Yemen. As of 2003, the district had a population of 50,747 inhabitants.
