= Sa'fan district =

Coordinates: 15°05′N 43°40′E

Sa'fan District مديرية صعفان
- District
- Interactive map of Sa'fan District
- Country: Yemen
- Governorate: Sana'a

Population (2003)
  - Total: 33,722
- Time zone: UTC+3 (Yemen Standard Time)

Sa'fan District (Arabic: مديرية صعفان) is a district of the Sana'a Governorate, Yemen. As of 2003, the district had a population of 33,722 inhabitants.
