= Bani Matar district =

Bani Matar District مُدِيْرِيَّة بَنِي مَطَر
- District
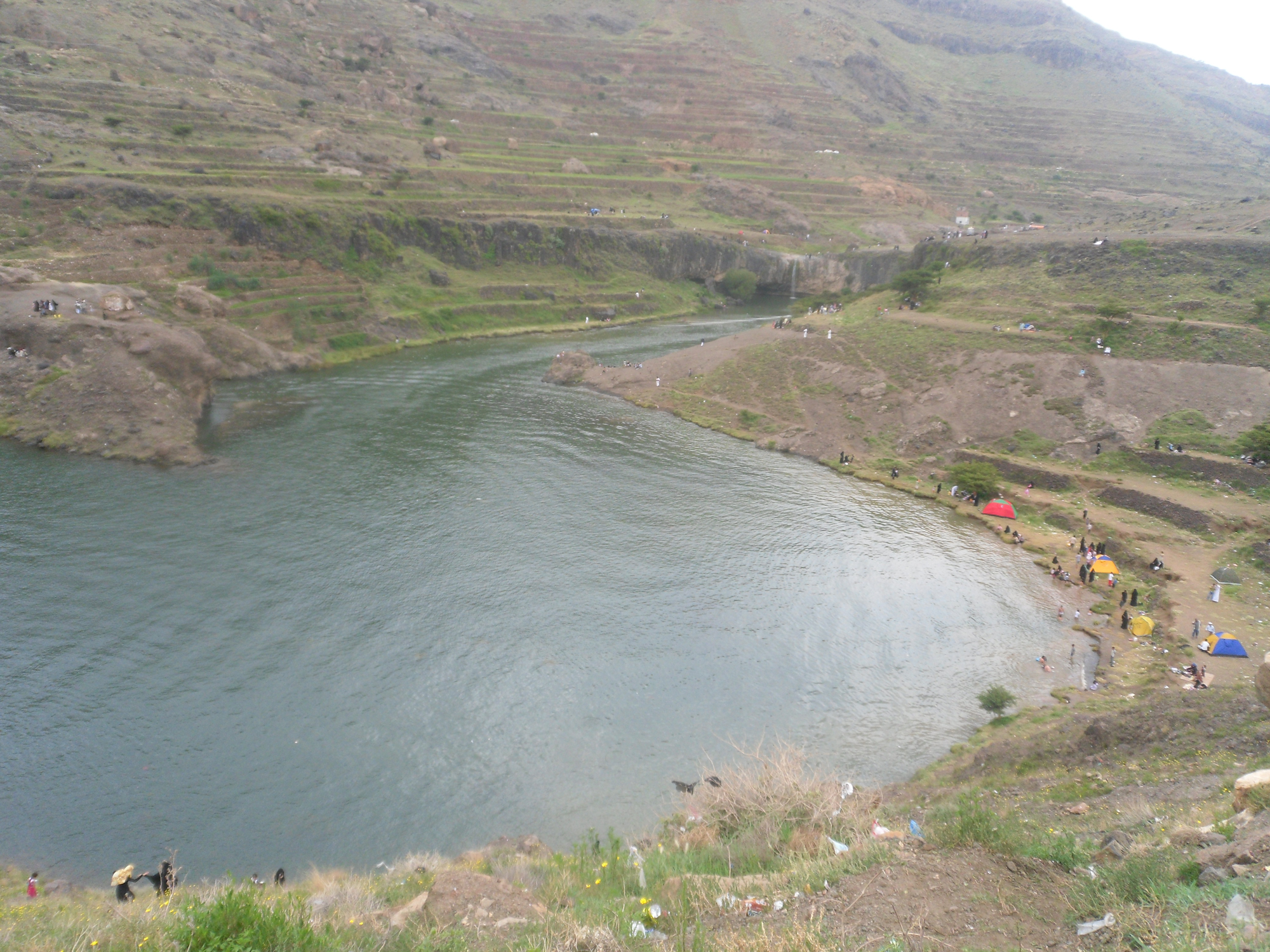
- Bani Matar Waterfall
- Interactive map of Bani Matar District
- Country: Yemen
- Governorate: Sanaa

Population (2003)
  - Total: 100,012
- Time zone: UTC+3 (Yemen Standard Time)

Bani Matar District (Arabic: مُدِيْرِيَّة بَنِي مَطَر, romanized: Mudīriyyat Banī Maṭar) is a district of the Sanaa Governorate, Yemen. As of 2003, the district had a population of 100,012 inhabitants.

== Environment ==
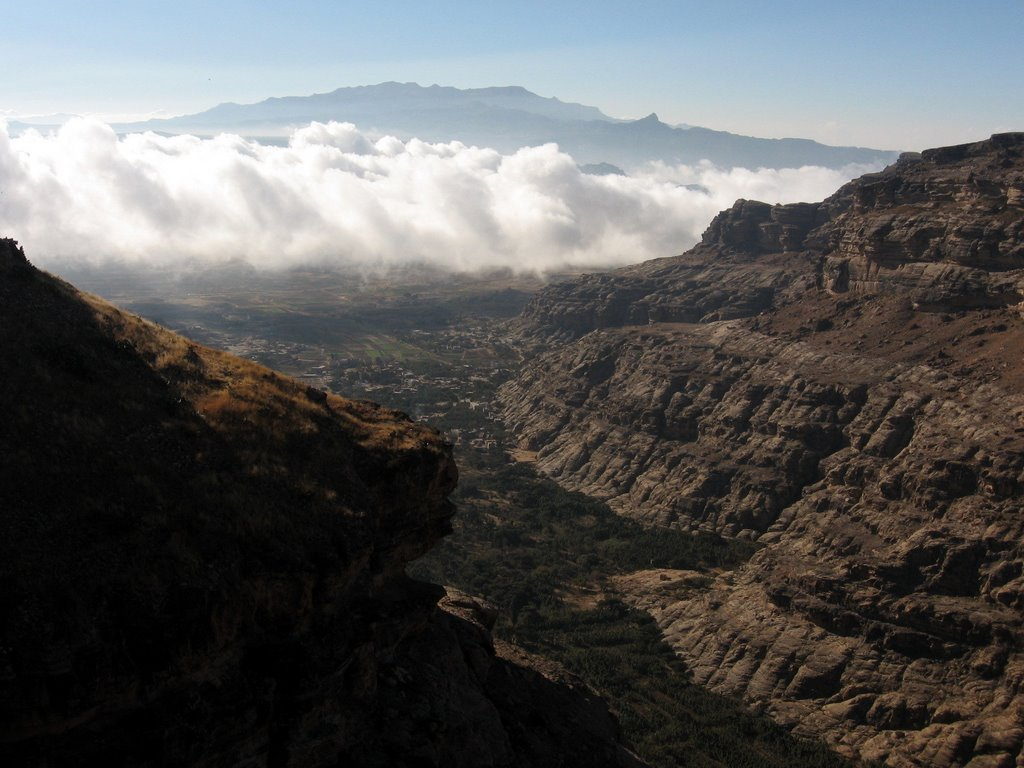
Jabal Hadhur or Jabal An-Nabi Shu'ayb, Arabia's highest mountain

In this district is located Jabal An-Nabi Shu'ayb or Jabal Hadhur of the Harazi subrange of the Sarat range, the highest mountain in Yemen and the Arabian Peninsula.
