= Sanaa Governorate =

Governorate of Yemen

Sanaa صَنْعَاء
- Governorate
- Country: Yemen
- Region: Azal Region
- Seat: Sanaa

Government
  - Governor: Abdul-Basit Al-Hadi

Area
  - Total: 15,052 km^{2} (5,812 sq mi)

Population (2011)
  - Total: 2,409,000
  - Density: 160.0/km^{2} (414.5/sq mi)

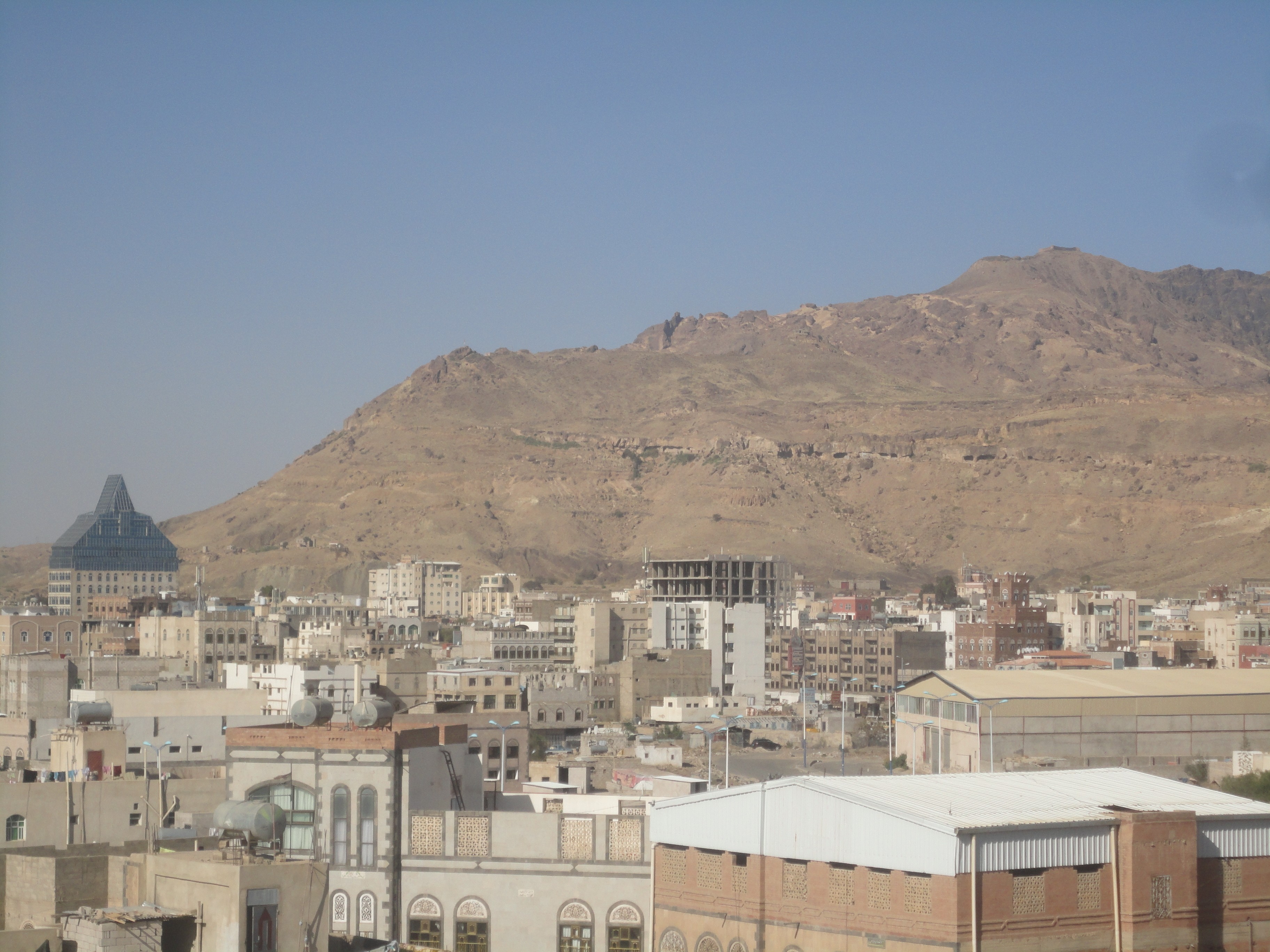
Jabal Nuqm or Jabal Nuqum in the area of Sana'a. Local legend has it that after the death of Noah, his son Shem built the city at the base of this mountain.

Sanaa (Arabic: صَنْعَاء Ṣanʿāʾ) (Note: Literary Arabic: [sˤɑnˈʕæːʔ], Yemeni Arabic: [ˈsˤɑnʕæ]), also spelled San'a' or Sana, is a governorate of Yemen. The capital is Sanaa, which is also the national capital. However, the city of Sanaa is not part of the governorate but instead forms the separate governorate of Amanat Al-Asemah. The Governorate covers an area of 13,850 km^{2} (5,350 sq mi). As of 2004, the population was 2,918,379 inhabitants. Within this place is Jabal An-Nabi Shu'ayb or Jabal Hadhur, the highest mountain in the nation and the Arabian Peninsula.

== Geography ==
=== Adjacent governorates ===
- Amanat Al-Asemah (Sanaa city)
- Marib Governorate (east)
- Al Bayda Governorate (south)
- Dhamar Governorate (south)
- Raymah Governorate (southwest)
- Al Hudaydah Governorate (west)
- Al Mahwit Governorate (west)
- 'Amran Governorate (northwest)
- Al Jawf Governorate (north)

=== Districts ===
Sanaa Governorate is divided into the following 16 districts. These districts are further divided into sub-districts, and then further subdivided into villages:

==== Northern ====
- Nihm district
- Arhab district

==== Western ====
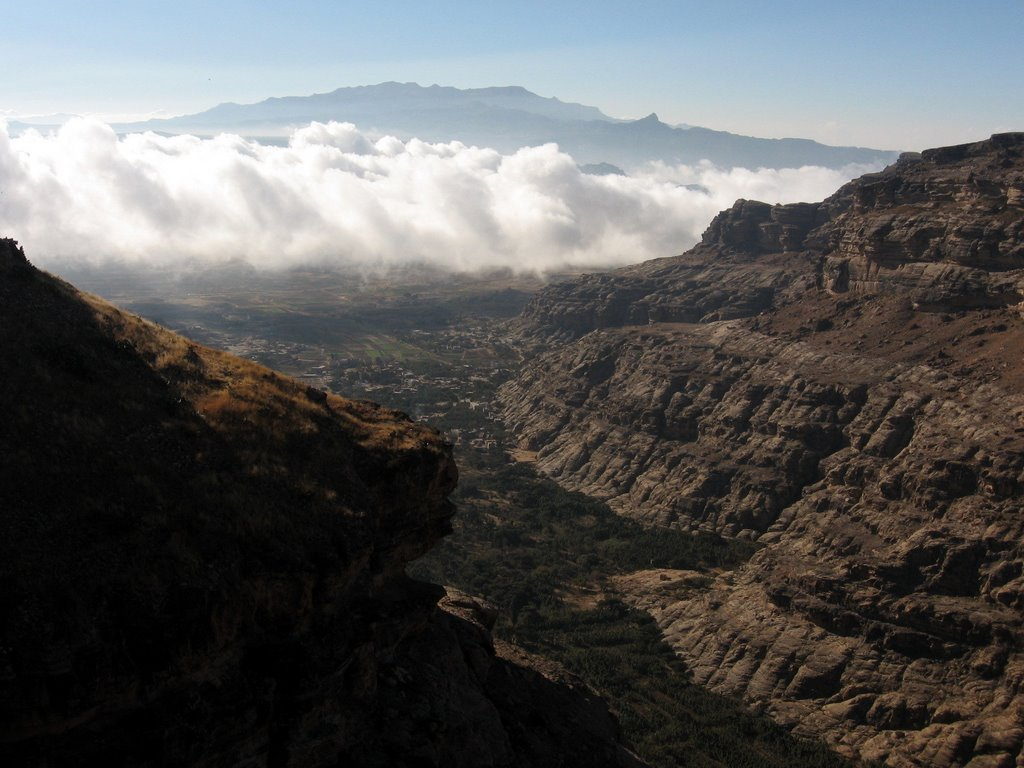
Arabia's highest mountain, Jabal Hadhur or Jabal An-Nabi Shu'ayb of the Harazi subrange of the Sarat range, is in Bani Matar district

- Hamdan district
- Bani Matar district (wherein is located Jabal An-Nabi Shu'ayb or Jabal Hadhur)
- Al Haymah Ad Dakhiliyah district
- Al Haymah Al Kharijiyah district
- Manakhah district
- Sa'fan district

==== Eastern ====
- Bani Hushaysh district
- Sanhan district
- Bilad Ar Rus district
- Attyal district
- Jihanah district
- Al Husn district
- Khwlan district
- Bani Dhabyan district
