= European exploration of Arabia =

The Arabian Peninsula, much of which now comprises the Kingdom of Saudi Arabia, has always held a mysterious attraction for European explorers. Until modern times it was uncharted, inaccessible, dangerous and forbidden. Some areas remain dangerous and forbidden to the present day. Mecca and Medina are holy cities in Islam and are forbidden to non-Muslims.

The first exploration of Arabia took place in the 16th Century when the Portuguese circumnavigated Arabia.

== German explorers ==
- Carsten Niebuhr was part of an expedition in 1762 which explored the south east of Arabia.

== British explorers ==
- Captain George Forster Sadlier the first European to cross Arabia from east to west in 1819, publishing the book, Diary of a Journey Across Arabia from El Khatif in the Persian Gulf to Yanbu in the Red Sea, During the Year 1819 in 1866.
- Sir Richard Francis Burton disguised himself as an Afghan doctor and performed Haj, writing about his travels in Pilgrimage to Al-Madinah and Meccah in 1856.
- William Gifford Palgrave was the first European to cross Arabia from west to east in 1862.
- Charles Montagu Doughty travelled through Arabia from 1876 to 1878 living with the Bedouin tribes and wrote a book Travels in Arabia Deserta in 1888.
- Lady Anne Blunt
- Captain William Shakespear made seven expeditions to the Arabian interior and was the first European to map the Nafud desert.
- Gertrude Bell
- T. E. Lawrence ("Lawrence of Arabia")
- Gerard Leachman was the first European to be received by Ibn Sa'ud in his home city.
- Major R. E. Cheesman was the first man to map the Arabian coast from the Gulf of Salwah to Uqair.
- Major A. L. Holt led a number of motorized expeditions through the deserts of Arabia, the first time such long journeys had been undertaken with such a large number of vehicles.
- Harry St. John Philby was awarded the Royal Geographical Society Founders Gold Medal for his journey across Arabia.
- Bertram Thomas became the first European to cross the Rub' Al Khali from 1930 and 1931, a journey he described in Arabia Felix in 1932.
- Gerald de Gaury
- Sir George Rendel
- Sir Wilfred Thesiger
- Sir Percy Cox

== See also ==
- Timeline of European exploration
