= Arabian Peninsula =

Peninsula in West Asia

Coordinates: 23°N 46°E

Native name: شبه الجزيرة العربية
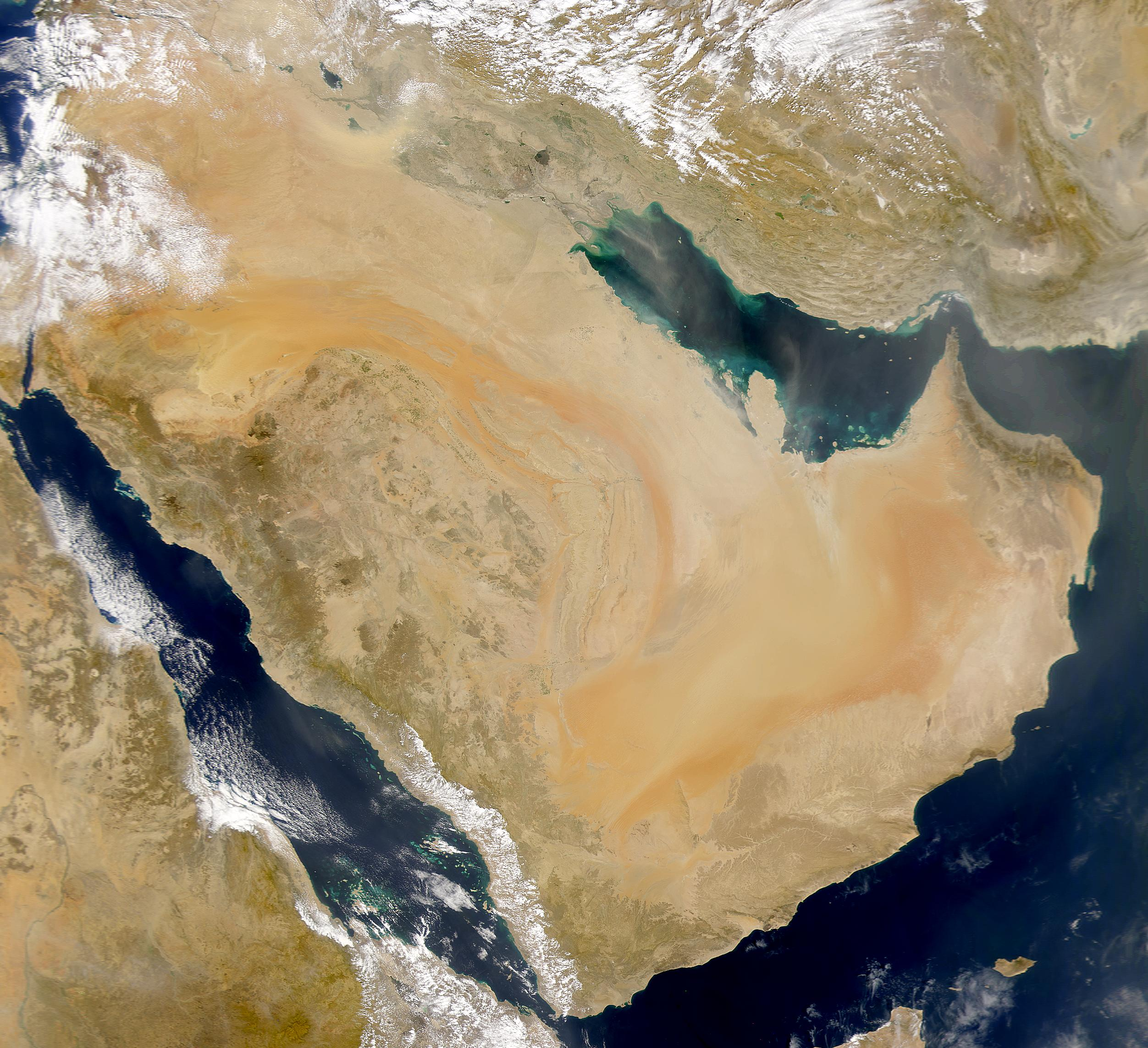
- Satellite imagery of the Arabian Peninsula in March 2000

Geography
- Location: West Asia
- Area: 3,237,500 km^{2} (1,250,000 sq mi)

Administration
- Bahrain (Note: As an island country, Bahrain is technically not a part of the Arabian Peninsula, but a part of the slightly larger geopolitical region called Arabia.); Iraq (Note: Southern half only.); Jordan; Kuwait; Oman; Qatar; Saudi Arabia; United Arab Emirates; Yemen
- Largest city: Riyadh

Demographics
- Demonym: Arabian; Arab
- Population: 95 million (2023 estimate)
- Pop. density: 29.0/km^{2} (75.1/sq mi)
- Languages: Arabic (Peninsular), Modern South Arabian languages

The Arabian Peninsula, (Note: Arabic: شبه الجزيرة العربية, romanized: shibh al-jazīra al-ʿarabiyya, or جزيرة العرب, jazīrat al-ʿarab, 'the Island of Arabs') or simply Arabia, is a peninsula in West Asia. It accounts for the majority of the land situated on the Arabian plate. With an area of 3,237,500 km^{2} (1.25 million mi^{2}), it is the world's largest peninsula—roughly comparable in size to India. Nine countries are located on the Arabian Peninsula: Bahrain, Kuwait, Oman, Qatar, Saudi Arabia, the United Arab Emirates, and Yemen, as well as the southern halves of Iraq and Jordan.

Geographically, the Arabian Peninsula is bounded by Mesopotamia and the Levant to the north and northwest and surrounded by the Indian Ocean: the Persian Gulf, the Strait of Hormuz, and the Gulf of Oman to the east and northeast; the Arabian Sea to the southeast; and the Gulf of Aden to the south, the Strait of Mandeb to the southwest, and the Red Sea to the west. Prior to the 7th century AD, Greco-Roman conceptions of "Arabia" were broader than the modern peninsula and extended into the Southern Levant, including the Sinai, the Negev, and regions of modern Jordan, as reflected in the Roman province of Arabia Petraea, whose capital was Petra. In this context, Sinai formed part of a wider regional classification rather than an isolated extension of the peninsula, despite being partly separated from it by the Gulf of Aqaba and situated on the African plate. Most of the peninsula is covered by the Arabian Desert, which is an extension of the Sahara Desert.

Between 56 and 23 million years ago, the peninsula was formed as a result of the Red Sea Rift involving the African and Arabian plates. It was among the first regions to be occupied by modern humans following their departure from Africa during the Paleolithic. The historical record of the Arabian Peninsula is thought to have begun in the early 1st millennium BC, when writing systems were introduced to the region. For much of the peninsula's ancient history, it was sparsely populated by Arab tribes and home to a variety of local and foreign religious practices, while numerous empires and kingdoms exercised limited political authority in different areas. However, in the 7th century AD, the entire Arabian Peninsula was politically, and religiously united by Prophet Muhammad.

While the Greco-Roman world had known the Arabian Peninsula in three large regions—Petraea for the north, Deserta for the centre, and Felix for the south—medieval Muslim geographers instead divided it into four main regions: the Central Plateau (Najd and Al-Yamama), South Arabia (Yemen, Hadhramaut, and southwestern Oman), Al-Bahrain (Eastern Arabia or Al-Hassa), and the Hejaz (Tihamah for the western coast). Since the 20th century, it has been of critical significance in both Arab and global geopolitics due to the discovery and subsequent industrialization of vast reserves of oil and natural gas. Most of the peninsula's countries are petrocracies and accordingly play a key role in the petroleum politics defining the contemporary Middle East.

== Etymology ==
In antiquity, the term "Arabia" encompassed a larger area than the current term "Arabian Peninsula" and included the Arabian Desert and large parts of the Syrian–Arabian desert. During the Hellenistic period, the area was known as Arabia (Ancient Greek: Ἀραβία). The Romans named three regions "Arabia":

- Arabia Petraea ('Stony Arabia'): it consisted of the former Nabataean Kingdom in the southern Levant, the Sinai Peninsula and north-western Arabian Peninsula. It was the only one that became a province, with Petra (in Jordan) as its capital.
- Arabia Deserta ('Desert Arabia'): signified the desert lands of Arabia. As a name for the region, it remained popular into the 19th and 20th centuries, and was used in Charles M. Doughty's Travels in Arabia Deserta (1888).
- Arabia Felix ('Fortunate Arabia'): was used by geographers to describe the southern part of the Arabian Peninsula, mostly what is now Yemen, which enjoys more rainfall, is much greener than the rest of the peninsula and has long enjoyed much more productive fields.

One of the nomes of Ptolemaic Egypt was named Arabia.

Arabians used a north–south division of Arabia: ash-Sham vs. al-Yaman, or Arabia Deserta vs. Arabia Felix. Arabia Felix had originally been used for the whole peninsula, and at other times only for the southern region. Because its use became limited to the south, the whole peninsula was simply called Arabia. Arabia Deserta was the entire desert region extending north from Arabia Felix to Palmyra and the Euphrates, including all the area between Pelusium on the Nile and Babylon. This area was also called Arabia and not sharply distinguished from the peninsula.

The Arabs and the Ottoman Empire considered the west of the Arabian Peninsula region where the Arabs lived 'the land of the Arabs'—bilad al-'Arab (Arabia), and its major divisions were the bilad al-Sham (Syria), bilad al-Yaman (Yemen), and bilad al-'Iraq (Iraq). The Ottomans used the term Arabistan in a broad sense for the region starting from Cilicia, where the Euphrates river makes its descent into Syria, through Palestine, and on through the remainder of the Sinai and Arabian peninsulas.

The provinces of Arabia were: al-Tih, the Sinai Peninsula, Hejaz, Asir, Yemen, Hadramaut, Mahra and Shilu, Oman, Hasa, Bahrain, Dahna, Nufud, the Hammad, which included the deserts of Syria, Mesopotamia and Babylonia.

== History ==
=== Prehistoric Arabia ===
Prehistoric Arabia is the period of the Arabian Peninsula before any written records are known, going back to when humans first began to settle in the region, until around 1000 BC, when systematic written documentation begins to appear in the archaeological record. Stone tools from the Middle Paleolithic era along with fossils of other animals discovered at Ti's al Ghadah, in north-western Saudi Arabia, might imply that hominins migrated through a "Green Arabia" between 300,000 and 500,000 years ago.

Two-hundred-thousand-year-old stone tools were discovered at Shuaib Al-Adgham in the eastern Al-Qassim Province, which would indicate that many prehistoric sites, located along a network of rivers, had once existed in the area. Acheulean tools found in Sadaqah, Riyadh Region reveal that hominids lived in the Arabian Peninsula around 188,000 years ago. Human habitation in Arabia may have occurred as early as 130,000 years ago. A fossilized Homo sapiens finger bone found at Al Wusta in the Nefud Desert dates to approximately 90,000 years ago and is the oldest human fossil discovered outside of Africa and the Levant. This indicates human migrations from Africa to Arabia occurred around this time.

The Arabian Peninsula may have been the homeland of a 'Basal Eurasian' population, which diverged from other Eurasians soon after the Out-of-Africa migration, and subsequently became isolated, until it started to mix with other populations in the Middle East around 25,000 years ago. These different Middle Eastern populations would later spread Basal Eurasian ancestry via the Neolithic Revolution to all of Western Eurasia.

=== Pre-Islamic Arabia ===
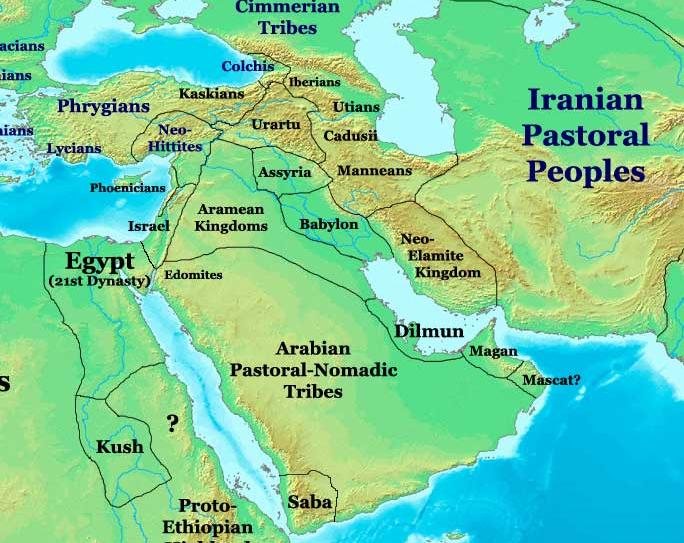
Pre-Islamic Arabia in 1000 BC

Map of the Arabian Peninsula in 600 AD, showing the various Arab tribes and their areas of settlement. The Lakhmids (yellow) formed an Arab monarchy as clients of the Sasanian Empire, while the Ghassanids (red) formed an Arab monarchy as clients of the Roman Empire.

Archaeology has revealed the existence of many civilizations in pre-Islamic Arabia (such as the Thamud), especially in South Arabia. South Arabian civilizations include the Kingdom of Saba, Awsan, Ma'in, and Himyar. From 106 AD to 630 AD, north-western Arabia was under the control of the Roman Empire, which renamed it Arabia Petraea. Central Arabia was the location of the Kingdom of Kinda in the 4th, 5th, and early 6th centuries, as well as the Ma'add tribes. Eastern Arabia was home to the Dilmun civilization. The earliest known events in Arabian history are migrations from the peninsula into neighbouring areas.

The Arabian Peninsula has long been accepted as the original Urheimat of the Semitic languages by most scholars.

=== Rise of Islam ===
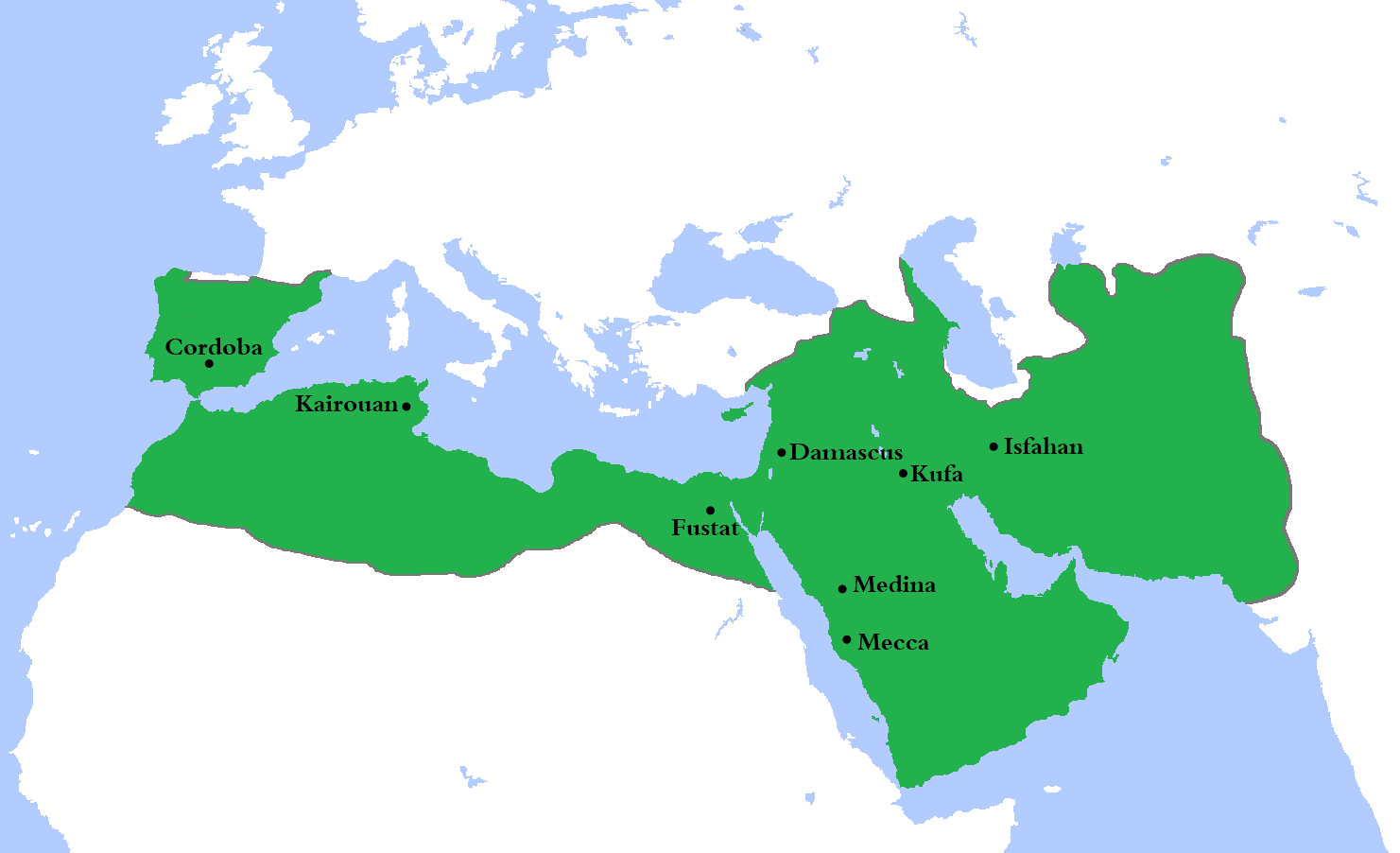
The Umayyad Caliphate (661–750)

The seventh century saw the rise of Islam as the peninsula's dominant religion. The Islamic prophet Muhammad was born in Mecca in about 570 and first began preaching in the city in 610, but migrated to Medina in 622. From there he and his companions united the tribes of Arabia under the banner of Islam and created the first Islamic state—a single Arab Muslim religious polity in the Arabian Peninsula.

Under the subsequent Rashidun and Umayyad Caliphates, rapid expansion of Arab power well beyond the Arabian Peninsula formed a vast Muslim Arab Empire with an area of influence that stretched from the north-west Indian subcontinent, across Central Asia, the Middle East, North Africa, southern Italy, and the Iberian Peninsula, to the Pyrenees.

Following Muhammad's death in 632, disagreement broke out over who would succeed him as leader of the Muslim community. Umar ibn al-Khattab, a prominent companion of Muhammad, nominated Abu Bakr, who was Muhammad's intimate friend and collaborator. Others added their support and Abu Bakr was made the first caliph. This choice was disputed by some of Muhammad's companions, who held that Ali ibn Abi Talib, his cousin and son-in-law, had been designated his successor. Abu Bakr's immediate task was to avenge a recent defeat by Byzantine (or Eastern Roman Empire) forces, although he first had to put down a rebellion by Arab tribes in an episode known as the Ridda wars, or "Wars of Apostasy".

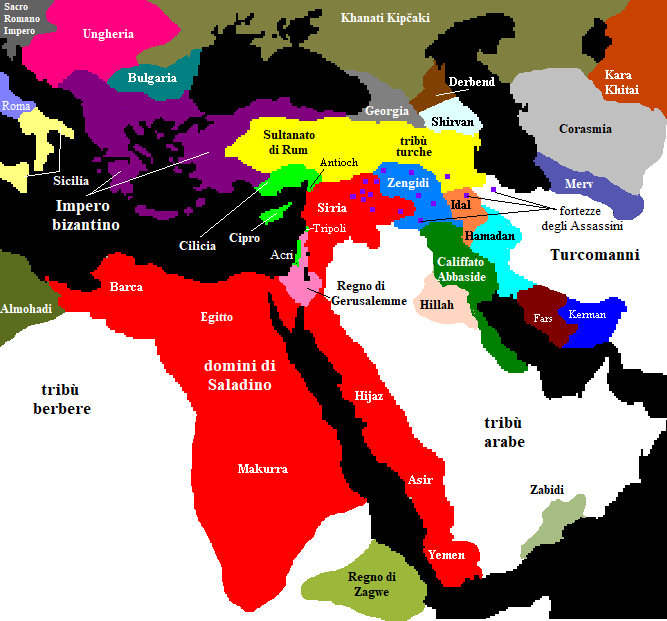
The Middle East, c. 1190. Saladin's empire and its vassals shown in red

On his death in 634, he was succeeded by Umar as caliph, followed by Uthman ibn al-Affan and Ali ibn Abi Talib. The period of these first four caliphs is known as al-khulafā' ar-rāshidūn: the Rashidun or "rightly guided" Caliphate. Under the Rashidun Caliphs, and, from 661, their Umayyad successors, the Arabs rapidly expanded the territory under Muslim control outside of Arabia. In a matter of decades Muslim armies decisively defeated the Byzantine army and destroyed the Persian Empire, conquering huge swathes of territory from the Iberian Peninsula to India. The political focus of the Muslim world then shifted to the newly conquered territories.

Nevertheless, Mecca and Medina remained the most spiritually important places in the Muslim world. The Qur'an requires every able-bodied Muslim who can afford it, as one of the five pillars of Islam, to make a pilgrimage, or Hajj, to Mecca during the Islamic month of Dhu al-Hijjah at least once in his or her lifetime. The Masjid al-Haram (the Grand Mosque) in Mecca is the location of the Kaaba, Islam's holiest site, and the Masjid al-Nabawi (the Prophet's Mosque) in Medina is the location of Muhammad's grave; as a result, from the 7th century, Mecca and Medina became the pilgrimage destinations for large numbers of Muslims from across the Islamic world.

=== Middle Ages ===
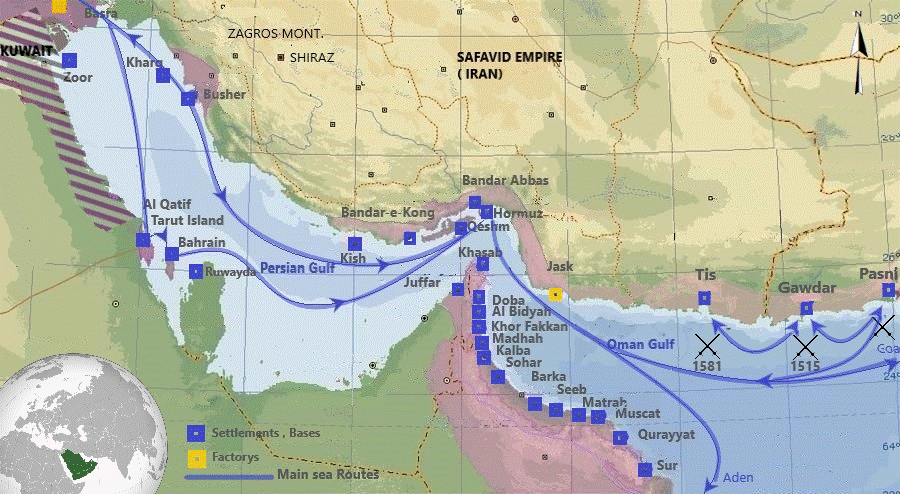
Portuguese colonies in Arabia

Despite its spiritual importance, in political terms, Arabia soon became a peripheral region of the Islamic world, in which the most important medieval Islamic states were based at various times in far-away cities such as Damascus, Baghdad, and Cairo. However, from the 10th century (and, in fact, until the 20th century) the Hashemite Sharifs of Mecca maintained a state in the most developed part of the region, the Hejaz. Their domain originally comprised only the holy cities of Mecca and Medina but in the 13th century it was extended to include the rest of the Hejaz. Although, the Sharifs exercised at most times independent authority in the Hejaz, they were usually subject to the suzerainty of one of the major Islamic empires of the time. In the Middle Ages, these included the Abbasids of Baghdad, and the Fatimids, Ayyubids, and Mamluks of Egypt.

=== Modern history ===
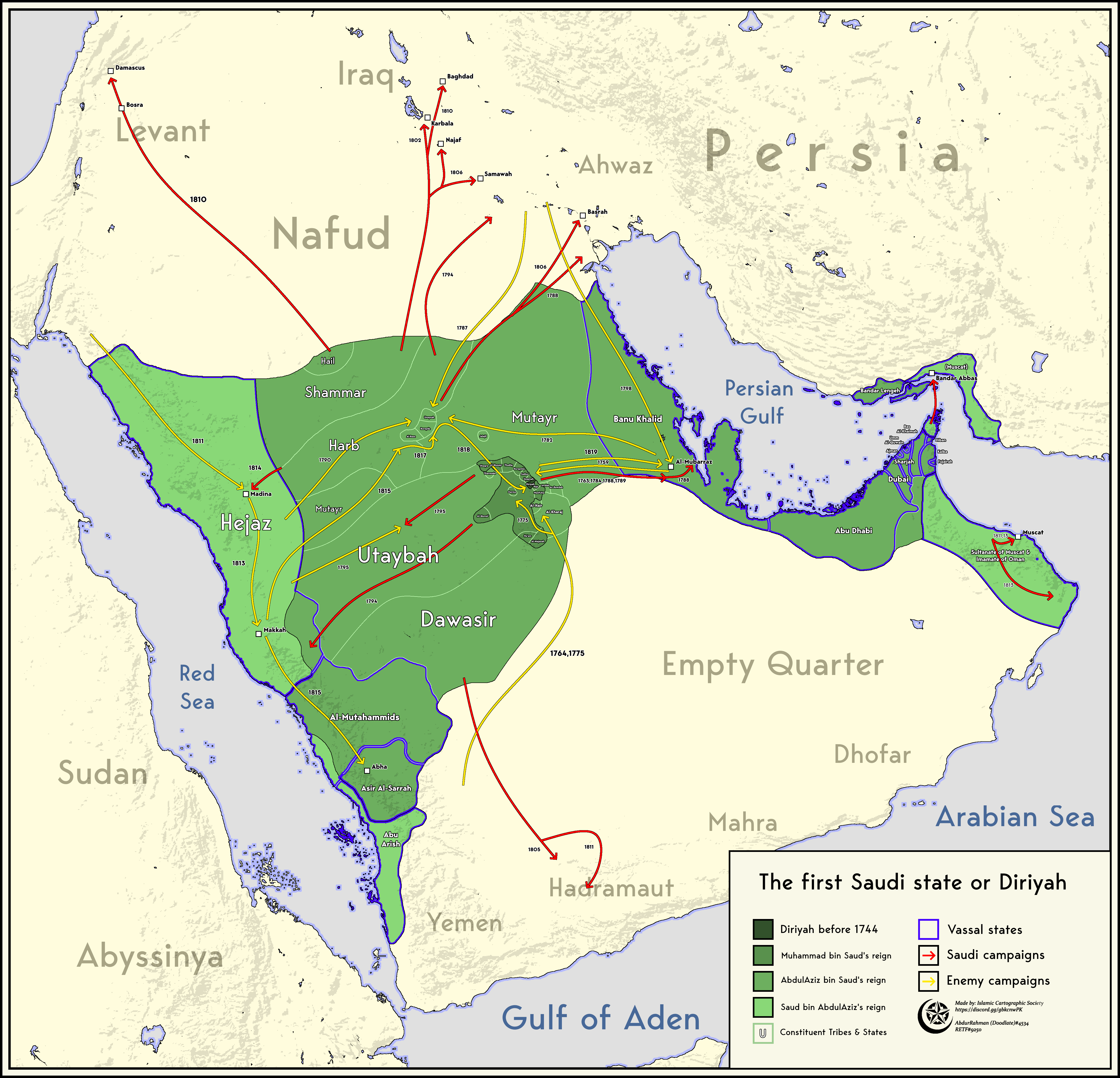
The expansion of the first Saudi State from 1744 to 1814

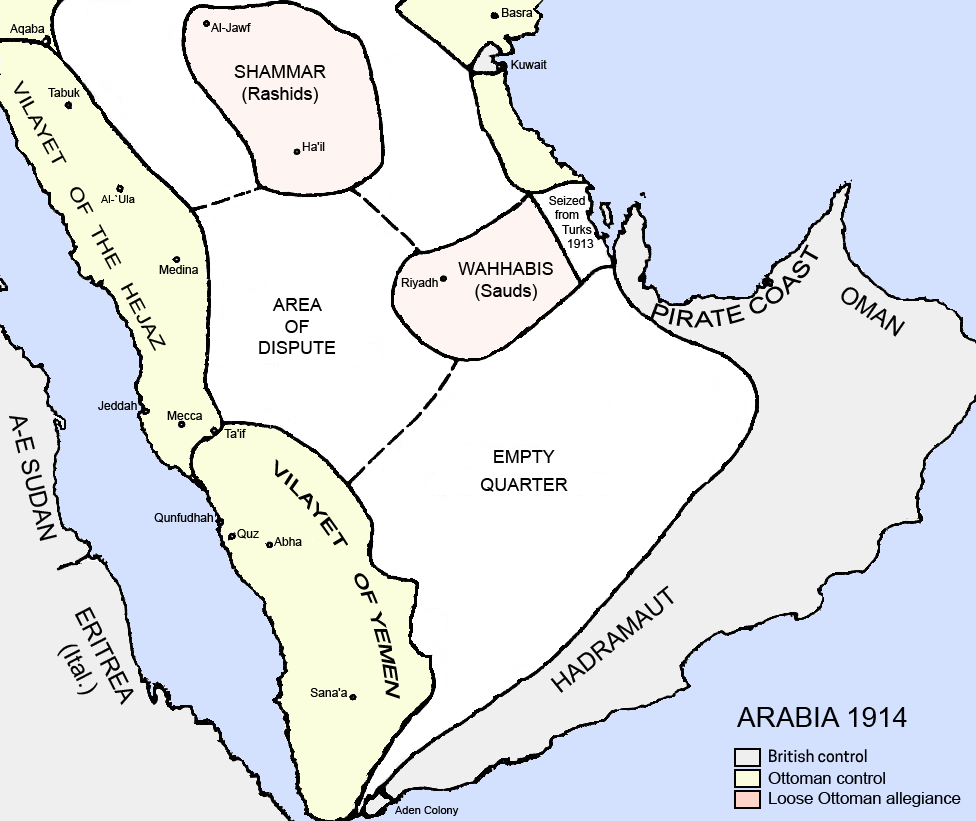
The Arabian Peninsula in 1914

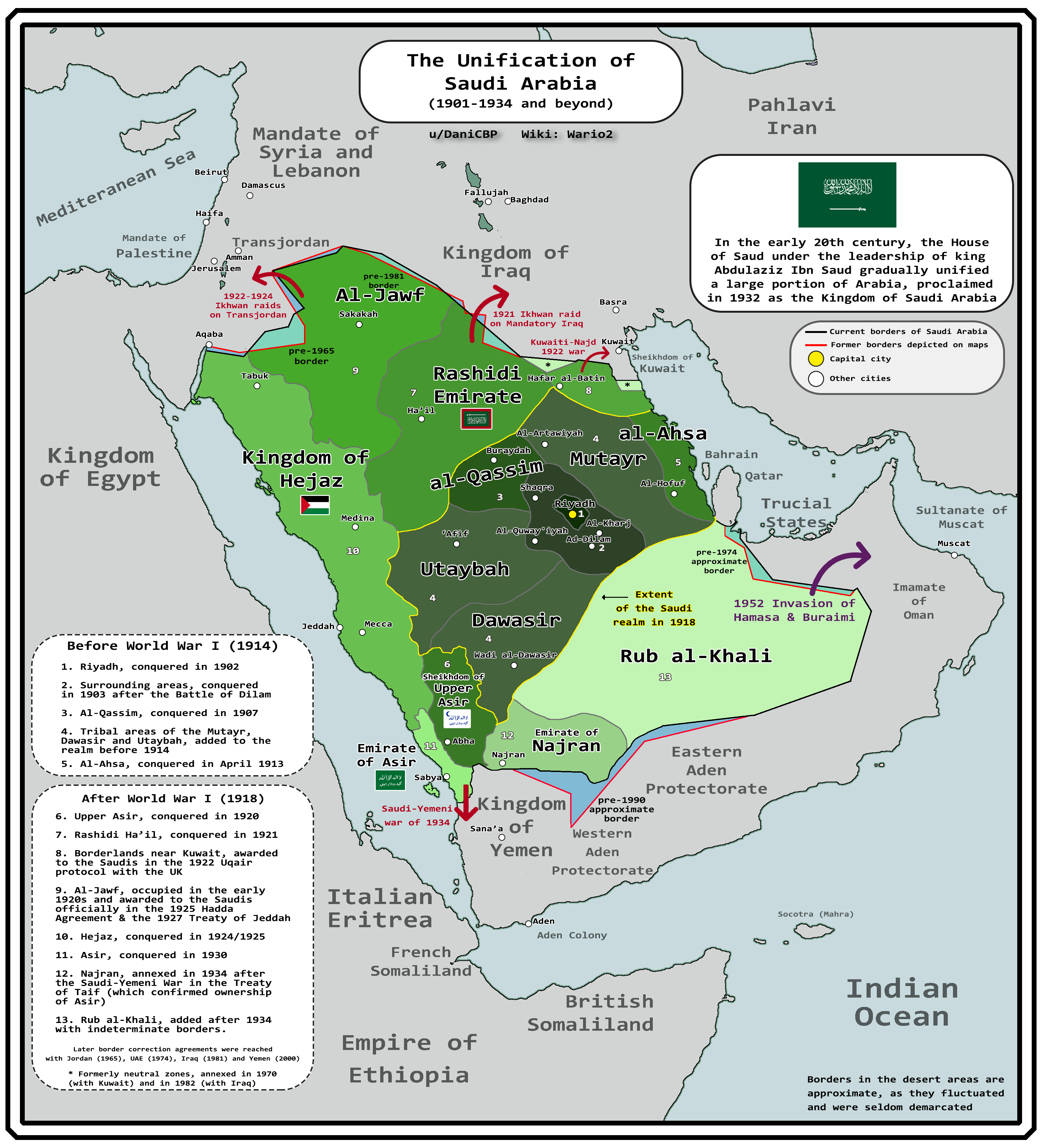
Territorial evolution of the Third Saudi State (1902–1934)

The provincial Ottoman Army for Arabia (Arabistan Ordusu) was headquartered in Syria, which included Palestine, the Transjordan region in addition to Lebanon (Mount Lebanon was, however, a semi-autonomous mutasarrifate). It was put in charge of Syria, Cilicia, Iraq, and the remainder of the Arabian Peninsula. The Ottomans never had any control over central Arabia, also known as the Najd region.

Historically, the nomadic Bedouin tribes of the Arabian Peninsula engaged in frequent inter-tribal warfare, conducting seasonal raids (known as ghazu) against rival clans as well as merchant and pilgrimage caravans over access to scarce pasturages and water resources. One of the most significant such incidents occurred during the 1757 Hajj caravan raid. Another prominent case was the long-standing rivalry between the Shammar and Anizah tribal confederations across northern Arabia and the Syrian Desert. During the late eighteenth century, these conflicts, together with the rise of the Wahhabi movement, contributed to the migration of a major Shammar faction under the Al Jarba family across the Euphrates into Upper Mesopotamia, where it later emerged as a dominant tribal force.

The emergence of what was to become the Saudi royal family, known as the Al Saud, began in Najd in central Arabia in 1744, when Muhammad bin Saud, founder of the dynasty, joined forces with the religious leader Muhammad ibn Abd al-Wahhab, founder of the Wahhabi movement, a strict puritanical form of Sunni Islam. The Emirate of Diriyah established in the area around Riyadh rapidly expanded and briefly controlled most of the present-day territory of Saudi Arabia, sacking Karbala in 1802, and capturing Mecca in 1803.

The Damascus Protocol of 1914 provides an illustration of the regional relationships. Arabs living in one of the existing districts of the Arabian peninsula, the Emirate of Hejaz, asked for a British guarantee of independence. Their proposal included all Arab lands south of a line roughly corresponding to the northern frontiers of present-day Syria and Iraq. They envisioned a new Arab state, or confederation of states, adjoining the southern Arabian Peninsula. It would have comprised Cilicia—İskenderun and Mersin, Iraq with Kuwait, Syria, Mount Lebanon Mutasarrifate, Jordan, and Palestine.

In the modern era, the term bilad al-Yaman came to refer specifically to the south-western parts of the peninsula. Arab geographers started to refer to the whole peninsula as 'jazirat al-Arab', or the peninsula of the Arabs.

==== Late Ottoman rule and the Hejaz Railway ====
The railway was started in 1900 at the behest of the Ottoman Sultan Abdul Hamid II and was built largely by the Turks, with German advice and support. A public subscription was opened throughout the Islamic world to fund the construction. The railway was to be a waqf, an inalienable religious endowment or charitable trust.

==== The Arab Revolt and the foundation of Saudi Arabia ====
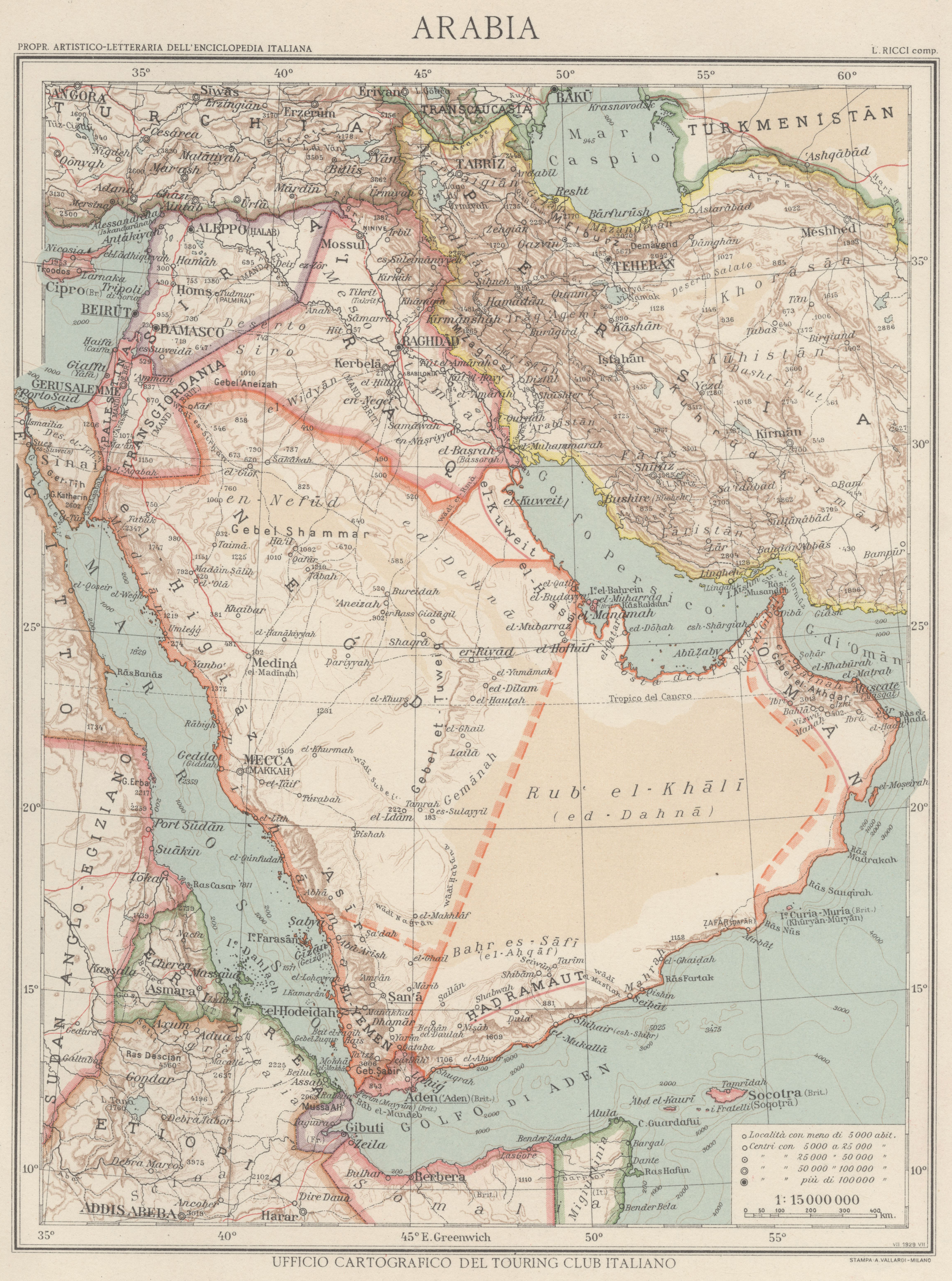
Physical and political elements of Arabia in 1929

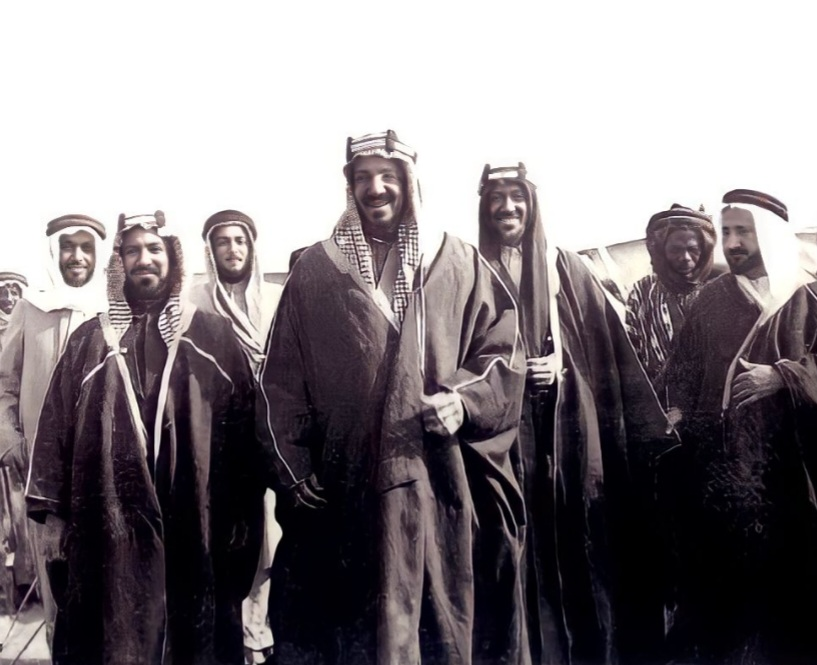
Abdulaziz Ibn Saud, the founding father and first king of Saudi Arabia

The major developments of the early 20th century were the Arab Revolt during World War I and the subsequent collapse and partitioning of the Ottoman Empire. The Arab Revolt (1916–1918) was initiated by the Sherif Hussein ibn Ali with the aim of securing independence from the ruling Ottoman Empire and creating a single unified Arab state spanning from Aleppo in Syria to Aden in Yemen. During World War I, Sharif Hussein entered into an alliance with the United Kingdom and France against the Ottomans in June 1916.

The Arabian Peninsula in 1923

These events were followed by the foundation of Saudi Arabia under King Abdulaziz Ibn Saud. After the collapse of the Emirate of Diriyah, the House of Saud regrouped and in 1824 founded the Second Saudi State, which would control most of Arabia for the next two-thirds of a century. Ibn Saud, after his family lost power in 1891, would establish the Third Saudi State, capturing Riyadh in 1902, and, successively subduing Al-Hasa, Jabal Shammar and Hejaz between 1913 and 1926. The Saudis then absorbed the Emirate of Asir, with their expansion only ending in 1934 after a war with Yemen.

==== Oil reserves ====
The second major development has been the discovery of vast reserves of oil in the 1930s. Its production brought great wealth to all countries of the region, with the exception of Yemen.

==== North Yemen Civil War ====
The North Yemen Civil War was fought in North Yemen between royalists of the Mutawakkilite Kingdom of Yemen and factions of the Yemen Arab Republic from 1962 to 1970. The war began with a coup d'état carried out by the republican leader, Abdullah as-Sallal, which dethroned the newly crowned Muhammad al-Badr and declared Yemen a republic under his presidency. The Imam escaped to the Saudi Arabian border and rallied popular support.

The royalist side received support from Saudi Arabia, while the republicans were supported by Egypt and the Soviet Union. Both foreign irregular and conventional forces were also involved. The Egyptian President, Gamal Abdel Nasser, supported the republicans with as many as 70,000 troops. Despite several military moves and peace conferences, the war sank into a stalemate. Egypt's commitment to the war is considered to have been detrimental to its performance in the Six-Day War of June 1967, after which Nasser found it increasingly difficult to maintain his army's involvement and began to pull his forces out of Yemen.

By 1970, King Faisal of Saudi Arabia recognized the republic and a truce was signed. Egyptian military historians refer to Egypt's role in the war in Yemen as analogous to the United States' role in the Vietnam War.

==== Gulf War ====
In 1990, Iraq invaded Kuwait. The invasion of Kuwait by Iraqi forces led to the 1990–91 Gulf War. Egypt, Qatar, Syria, and Saudi Arabia joined a multinational coalition that opposed Iraq. Displays of support for Iraq by Jordan and Palestine resulted in strained relations between many of the Arab states. After the war, a so-called "Damascus Declaration" formalized an alliance for future joint Arab defensive actions between Egypt, Syria, and the GCC member states.

==== 2014 Yemen civil war ====
The Arab Spring reached Yemen in January 2011. People of Yemen took to the street demonstrating against three decades of rule by President Ali Abdullah Saleh. The demonstration led to cracks in the ruling General People's Congress (GPC) and Saleh's Sanhani clan. Saleh used tactics of concession and violence to save his presidency. After numerous attempts, Saleh accepted the Gulf Cooperation Council's mediation. He eventually handed power to Vice President Hadi, who was sworn in as President of Yemen on 25 February 2012. Hadi launched a national dialogue to address new constitutional, political and social issues. The Houthi movement, dissatisfied with the outcomes of the national dialogue, launched an offensive and stormed the Yemeni capital Sanaa on 21 September 2014. In response, Saudi Arabia launched a military intervention in Yemen in March 2015. The civil war and subsequent military intervention and blockade caused a famine in Yemen.

== Geography ==
A map of the geographic regions of the Arabian Peninsula

The Arabian Peninsula is located in the continent of Asia and is bounded by (clockwise) the Persian Gulf to the north-east, the Strait of Hormuz and the Gulf of Oman to the east, the Arabian Sea to the south-east, the Gulf of Aden and the Guardafui Channel to the south, and the Bab-el-Mandeb strait to the south-west and the Red Sea to the south-west and west.

The northern portion of the peninsula transitions into the Syrian Desert with no clear borderline, although the northern boundary of the peninsula is generally considered to be the northern borders of Saudi Arabia and Kuwait, as well as the southern regions of Iraq and Jordan.

The most prominent feature of the peninsula is the desert, but in the south-west, there are mountain ranges, which receive greater rainfall than the rest of the peninsula. Harrat ash Shaam is a large volcanic field that extends from north-western Arabia into Jordan and southern Syria.

=== Landscape ===
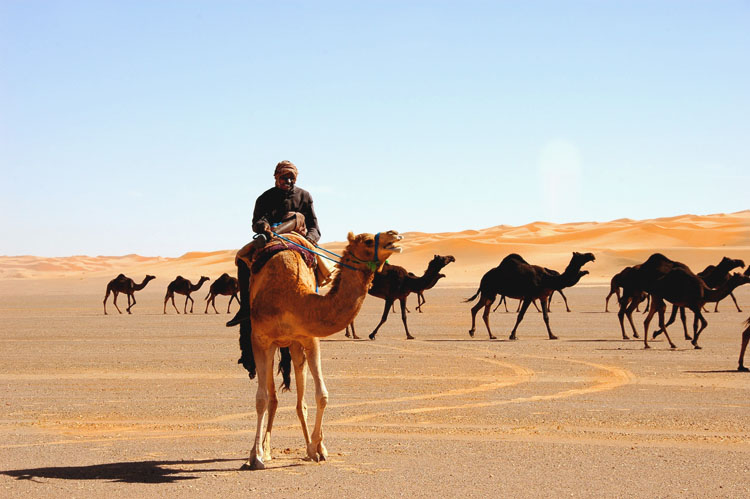
A caravan crossing Ad-Dahna Desert in central Saudi Arabia

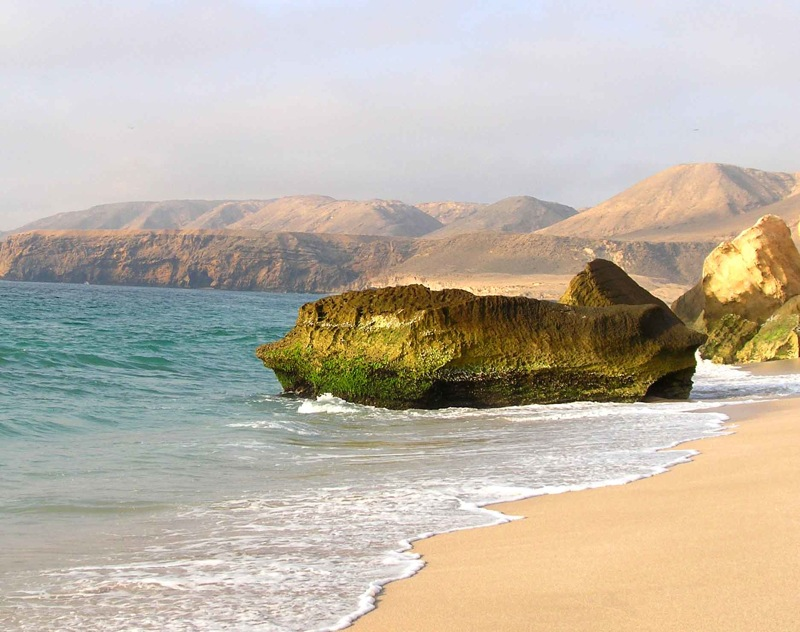
Ras al-Jinz in southeastern Arabia (Oman), also known as the 'Turtle Beach'

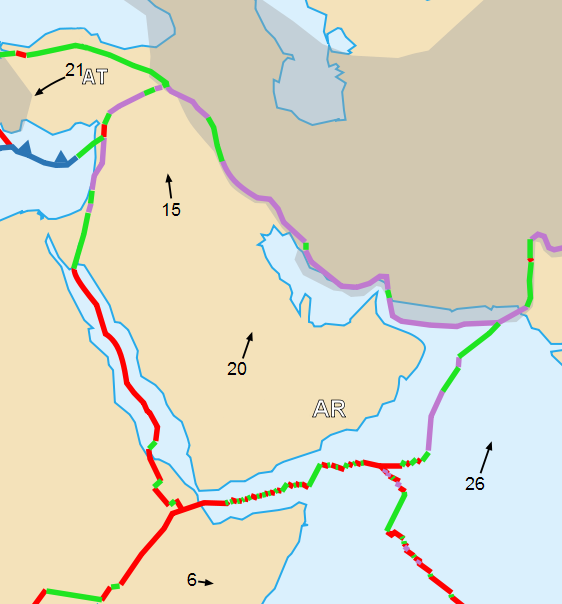
AR-Arabian Plate, velocities with respect to Africa in millimeters per year

The rocks exposed vary systematically across Arabia, with the oldest rocks exposed in the Arabian-Nubian Shield near the Red Sea, overlain by earlier sediments that become younger towards the Persian Gulf. Perhaps the best-preserved ophiolite on Earth, the Samail Ophiolite, lies exposed in the mountains of the UAE and northern Oman.

The peninsula consists of:

1. A central plateau, the Najd, with fertile valleys and pastures used for the grazing of sheep and other livestock
2. A range of deserts: the Nefud in the north, which is stony; the Rub' al Khali or Great Arabian Desert in the south, with sand estimated to extend 600 ft (180 m) below the surface; between them, the Dahna Mountains
3. Stretches of dry or marshy coastline with coral reefs on the Red Sea side (Tihamah)
4. Oases and marshy coast-land in Eastern Arabia, the most important of which are those of the Al Ain emirate (Tawam region) and Hofuf/Al-Ahsa (in modern-day Saudi Arabia), according to an author
5. The south-west monsoon coastline of Dhofar and Eastern Yemen (Mahra).

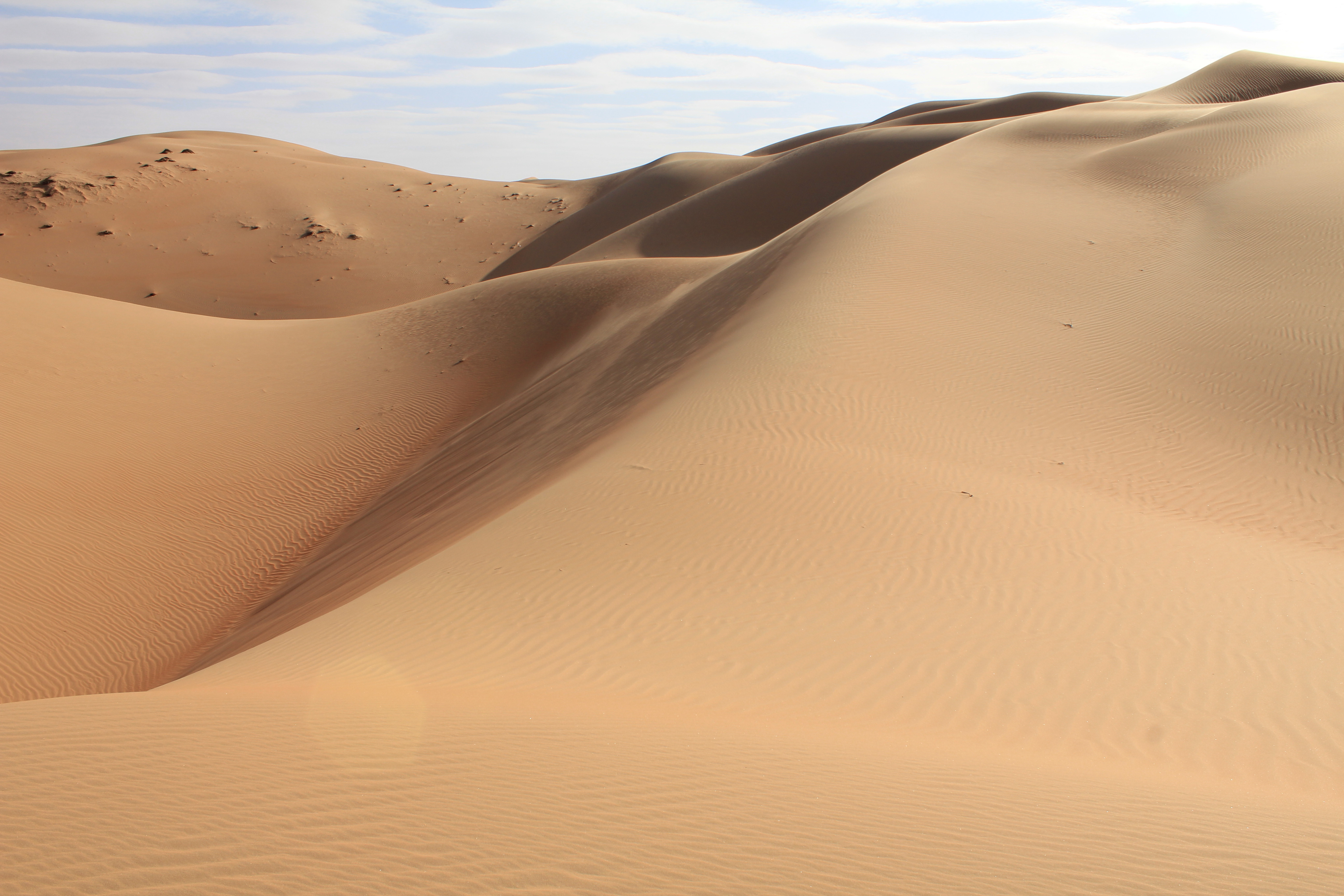
Rub' al Khali is part of the larger Arabian Desert

Arabia has few lakes or permanent rivers. Most areas are drained by ephemeral watercourses called wadis, which are dry except during the rainy season. Plentiful ancient aquifers exist beneath much of the peninsula, however, and where this water surfaces, oases form (e.g. Al-Hasa and Qatif, two of the world's largest oases) and permit agriculture, especially palm trees, which allowed the peninsula to produce more dates than any other region in the world.

In general, the climate is extremely hot and arid, although there are exceptions. Higher elevations are made temperate by their altitude, and the Arabian Sea coastline can receive cool, humid breezes in summer due to cold upwelling offshore. The peninsula has no thick forests. Desert-adapted wildlife is present throughout the region.

A plateau more than 2,500 feet (760 m) high extends across much of the Arabian Peninsula. The plateau slopes eastwards from the massive, rifted escarpment along the coast of the Red Sea, to the shallow waters of the Persian Gulf. The interior is characterized by cuestas and valleys, drained by a system of wadis. A crescent of sand and gravel deserts lies to the east.

==== Mountains ====
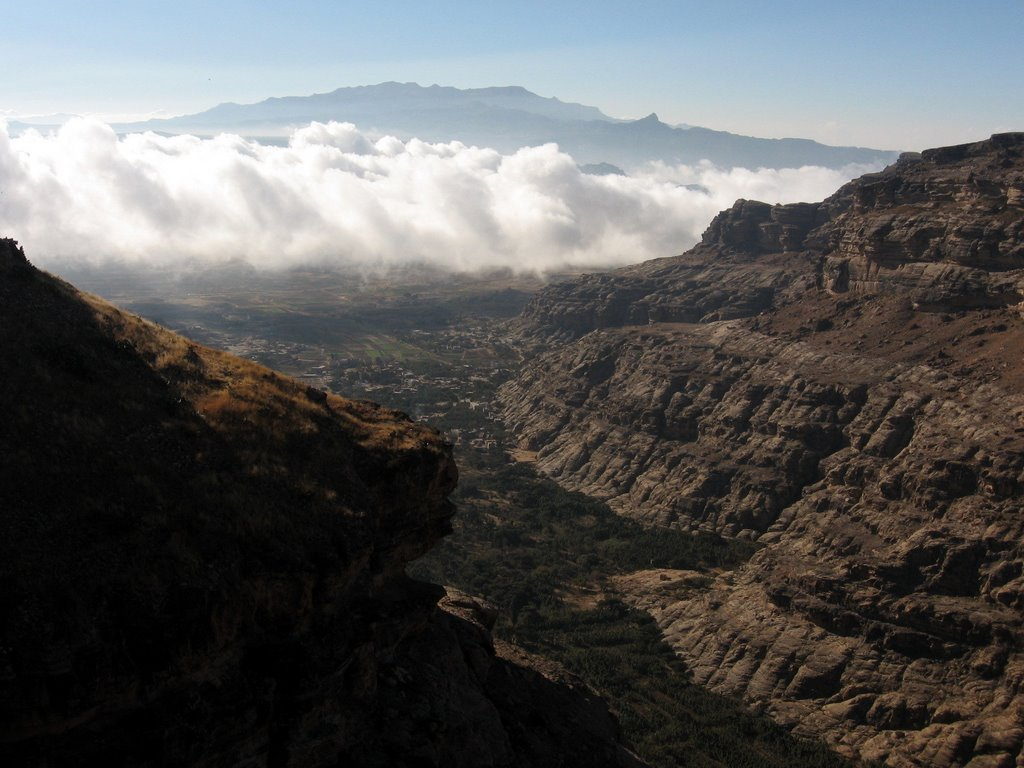
The Haraz Mountains in the west of present-day Yemen include Arabia's highest mountain, Jabal An-Nabi Shu'ayb or Jabal Hadhur near Sanaa.

There are mountains at the eastern, southern and north-western borders of the peninsula. Broadly, the ranges can be grouped as follows:

- North-east: The Hajar range, of UAE and Oman
- South-east: The Dhofar Mountains of southern Oman, contiguous with the eastern Yemeni Hadhramaut
- West: Bordering the eastern coast of the Red Sea are the Sarawat, which can be seen to include the Haraz Mountains to the east of Yemen, as well as those of 'Asir (once part of Yemen) and Hejaz the latter including the Midian in what is now north-western Saudi Arabia
- North-west: Aside from the Sarawat, the northern portion of Saudi Arabia hosts the Jabal Shamar Mountains, which include the Aja and Salma subranges
- Central: The Najd hosts the Tuwaiq Escarpment or Tuwair range

From the Hijaz southwards, the mountains show a steady increase in altitude westward as they get nearer to Yemen, and the highest peaks and ranges are all located in Yemen. The highest, Jabal An-Nabi Shu'ayb or Jabal Hadhur of the Haraz subrange of the Sarawat range, is 3,666 metres (12,028 ft) high. By comparison, the Tuwayr, Shammar, and Dhofar generally do not exceed 1,000 m (3,300 ft) in height.

Not all mountains in the peninsula are visibly within ranges. Jebel Hafeet in particular, on the border of the UAE and Oman, measuring between 1,100 and 1,300 m (3,600 and 4,300 ft), is not within the Hajar range, but may be considered an outlier of that range.

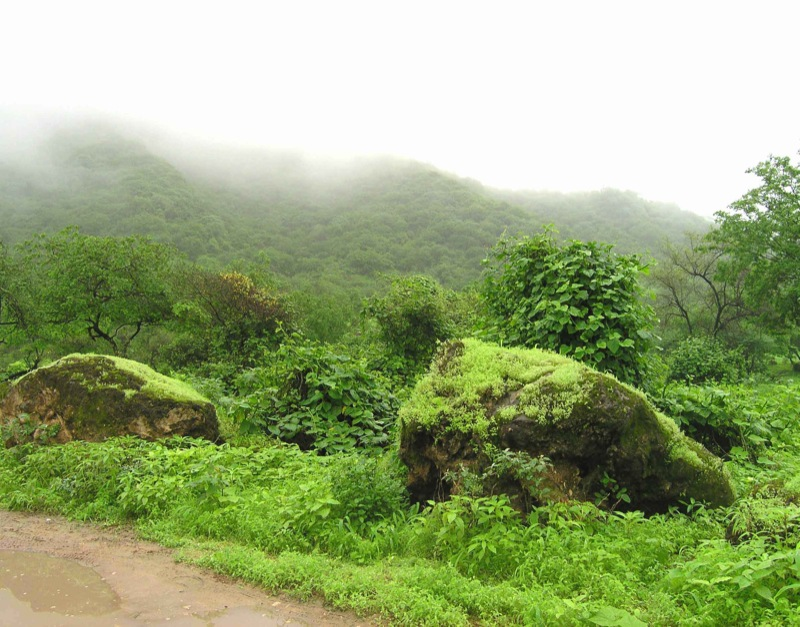
Dhofar, Oman

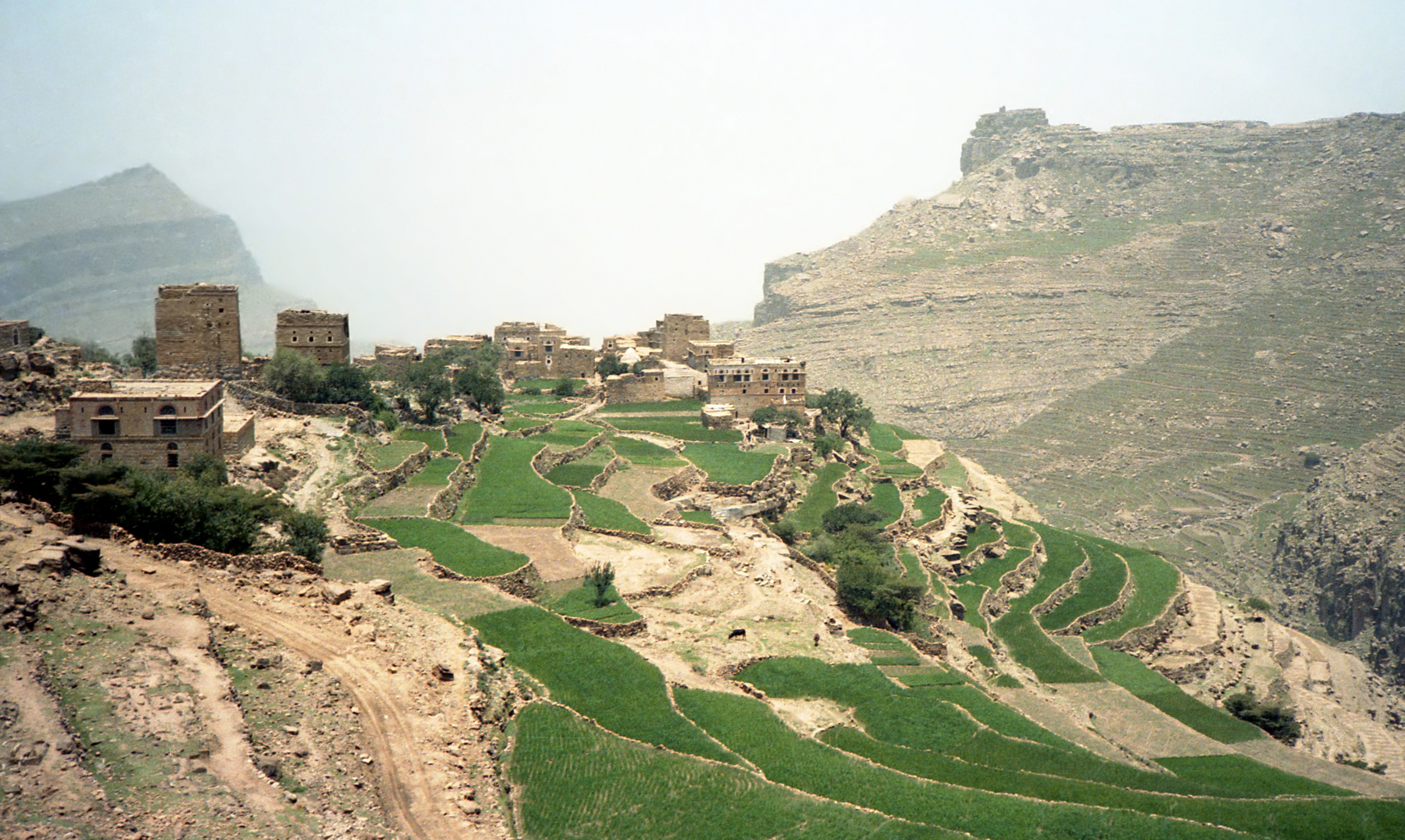
At-Tawilah, Al Mahwit, Yemen

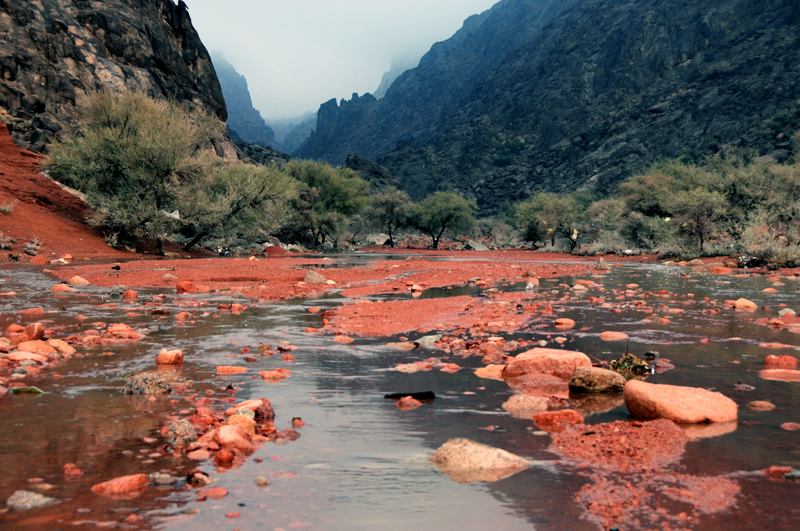
A subrange of the Jabal Shammar mountains in the desert region of Ha'il, Saudi Arabia

=== Land and sea ===
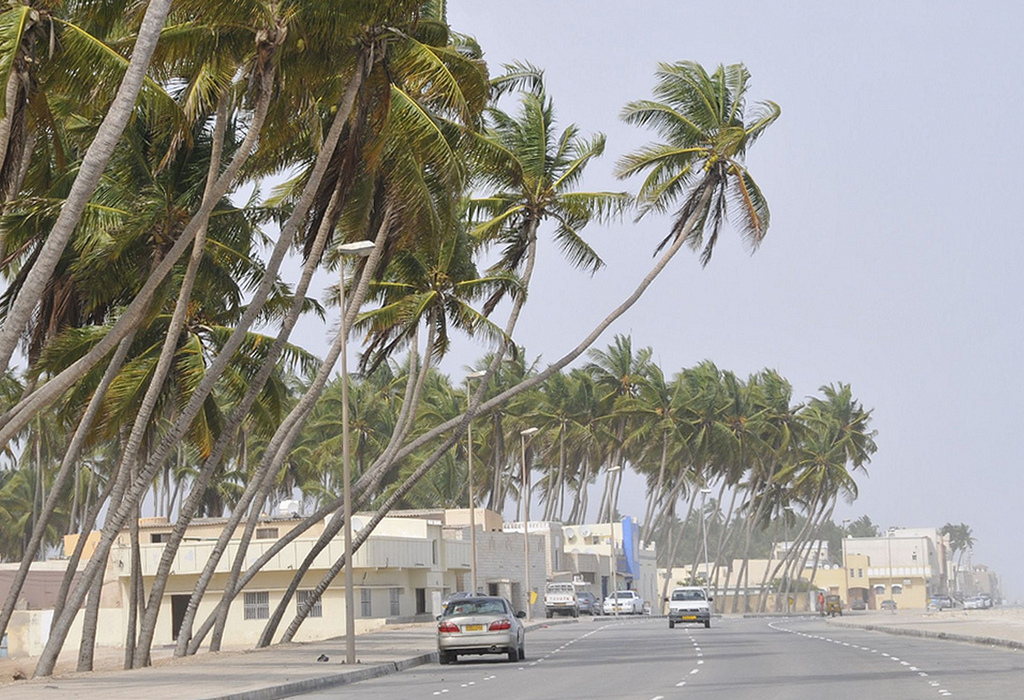
Coconut palms line corniches of Al-Hafa, Oman.

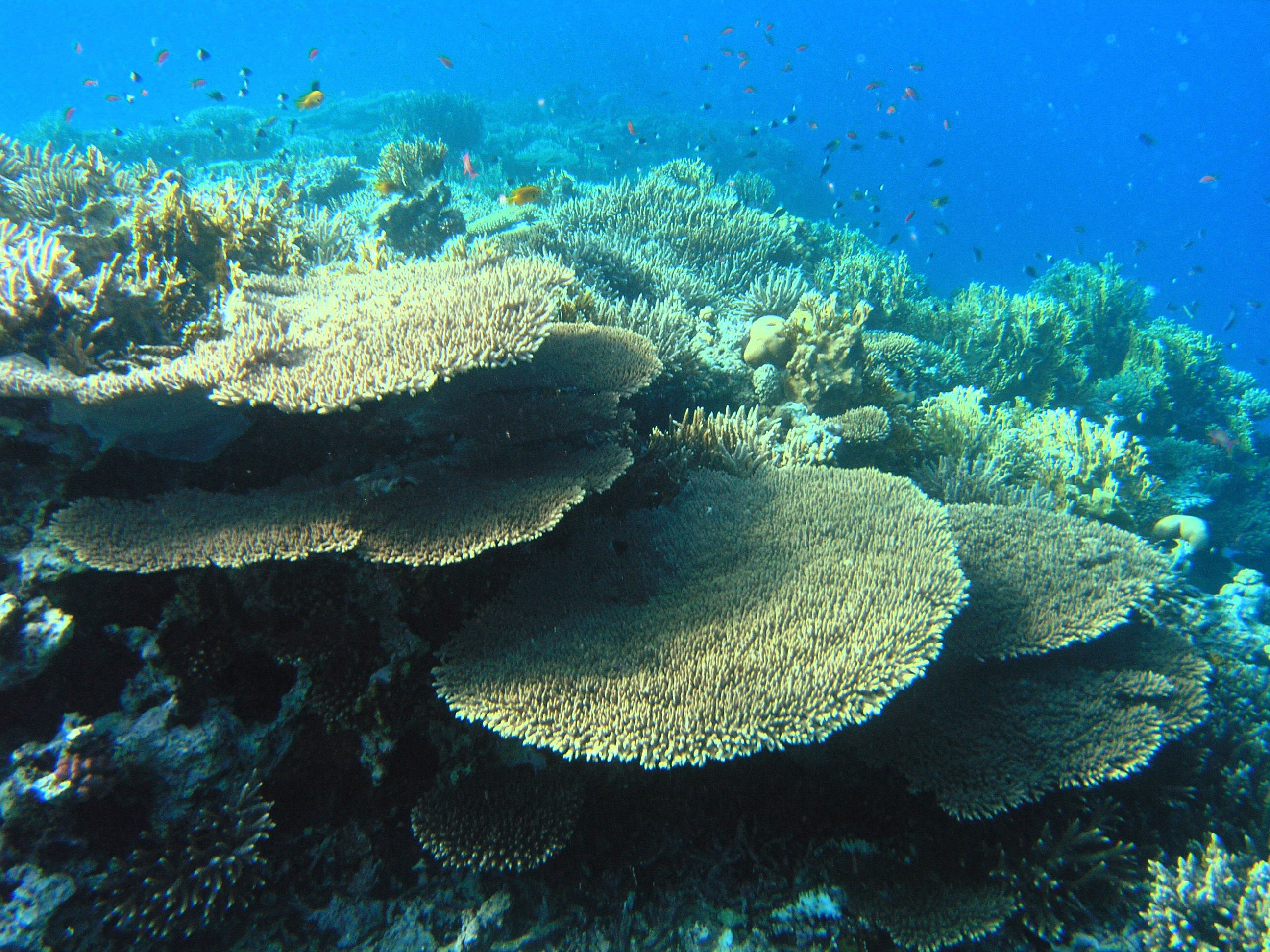
Red Sea coral reefs

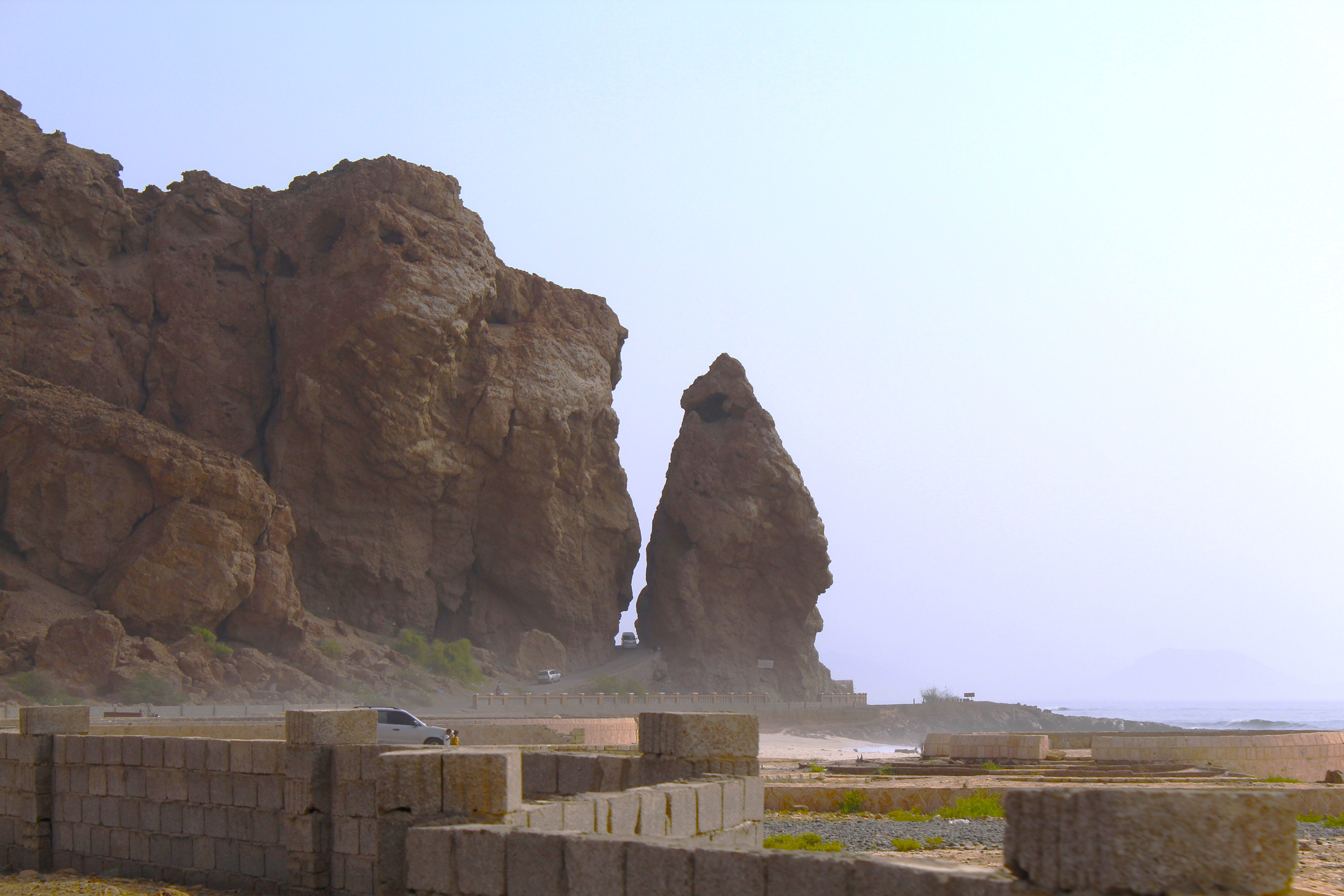
Al-Shaggain rock formation in Burum, a tentative World Heritage Site in Yemen

Most of the Arabian Peninsula is unsuited to agriculture, making irrigation and land reclamation projects essential. The narrow coastal plain and isolated oases, amounting to less than 1% of the land area, are used to cultivate grains, coffee, and tropical fruits. Goat, sheep, and camel husbandry is widespread elsewhere throughout the rest of the Peninsula.

Some areas have a summer humid tropical monsoon climate, in particular the Dhofar and Al Mahrah areas of Oman and Yemen. These areas allow for large scale coconut plantations. Much of Yemen has a tropical monsoon rain influenced mountain climate. The plains usually have either a tropical or subtropical arid desert climate or arid steppe climate.

The Red Sea to the west and the Gulf of Aden to the south have rich marine life and extensive coral reefs, home to more than 310 coral species, with roughly 270 being hard coral. The protozoa and zooxanthellae living in symbiosis with Red Sea corals have an unusual hot weather adaptation to sudden rise and fall in sea water temperature. Hence, these coral reefs are not affected by coral bleaching caused by rise in temperatures, as Indo-Pacific coral reefs are.

The reefs are also unaffected by mass tourism and diving or other large scale human interference. The Persian gulf has suffered significant loss and degradation of coral reefs with the biggest ongoing threat believed to be coastal construction activity altering the marine environment.

The fertile soils of Yemen have encouraged settlement of almost all of the land from sea level up to the mountains at 10,000 feet (3,000 m). In the higher elevations, elaborate terraces have been constructed to facilitate grain, fruit, coffee, ginger, and khat cultivation. The Arabian Peninsula is known for its rich oil, i.e. petroleum production due to its geographical location.

According to NASA's Gravity Recovery and Climate Experiment (GRACE) satellite data (2003–2013) analysed in a University of California, Irvine (UCI)-led study published in Water Resources Research in June 2015, the most over-stressed aquifer system in the world is the Arabian Aquifer System, upon which more than 60 million people depend for water. Twenty-one of the 37 largest aquifers "have exceeded sustainability tipping points and are being depleted" and thirteen of them are "considered significantly distressed".

== Political boundaries ==
The constituent countries of Arabia

The Peninsula's constituent countries are (clockwise from north to south) Kuwait, Qatar, and the United Arab Emirates (UAE) in the east, Oman in the south-east, Yemen in the south, and Saudi Arabia at the center. The island country of Bahrain lies just off the east coast of the Peninsula, to the northwest of Qatar. Due to Yemen's jurisdiction over the Socotra Archipelago, the Peninsula's geopolitical outline faces the Guardafui Channel and the Somali Sea to the south.

The six countries of Bahrain, Kuwait, Oman, Qatar, Saudi Arabia, and the UAE form the Gulf Cooperation Council (GCC).

The Kingdom of Saudi Arabia covers the largest part of the Peninsula. The Peninsula contains the world's largest oil reserves. Saudi Arabia and the UAE are economically the wealthiest in the region. Qatar, the only peninsular country in the Persian Gulf on the larger peninsula, is home to the Arabic television station Al Jazeera and its English-language subsidiary Al Jazeera English. Kuwait, on the border with Iraq, is an important country strategically, forming one of the main staging grounds for coalition forces mounting the United States–led 2003 invasion of Iraq.

== Demographics ==
=== Population ===
Historical population
Year	Pop.	±%
1950	9,481,713	—
1960	11,788,232	+24.3%
1970	15,319,678	+30.0%
1980	23,286,256	+52.0%
1990	35,167,708	+51.0%
2000	47,466,523	+35.0%
2010	63,364,000	+33.5%
2014	77,584,000	+22.4%
2018	86,221,765	+11.1%
2023	93,900,000	+8.9%
Political Definition: Gulf Cooperation Council and Yemen; Sources:1950–2000 2000–2014

Historical population (Gulf 4)
Year	Pop.	±%
1950	356,235	—
1970	1,329,168	+273.1%
1990	4,896,491	+268.4%
2010	11,457,000	+134.0%
2014	17,086,000	+49.1%
2018	18,675,440	+9.3%
Population of 4 smallest (in area) GCC states with their coastline in the Persian Gulf: UAE, Bahrain, Qatar, Kuwait; Sources:1950–2000 2000–2014

Despite its historically sparse population, political Arabia stands out for its rapid population growth, driven by both significant inflows of migrant labor and persistently high birth rates. The population is characterized by its relative youth and a heavily skewed gender ratio favoring males. In several states, the number of South Asians surpasses that of the native population.

The four smallest states by area, with coastlines entirely bordering the Persian Gulf, showcase the world's most extreme population growth, nearly tripling every two decades. In 2014, the estimated population of the Arabian Peninsula was 77,983,936, including expatriates.

The Arabian Peninsula is known for having one of the most uneven adult sex ratios in the world, with females in some regions, especially the east, constituting only a quarter of people aged between 20 and 40.

=== Cities ===
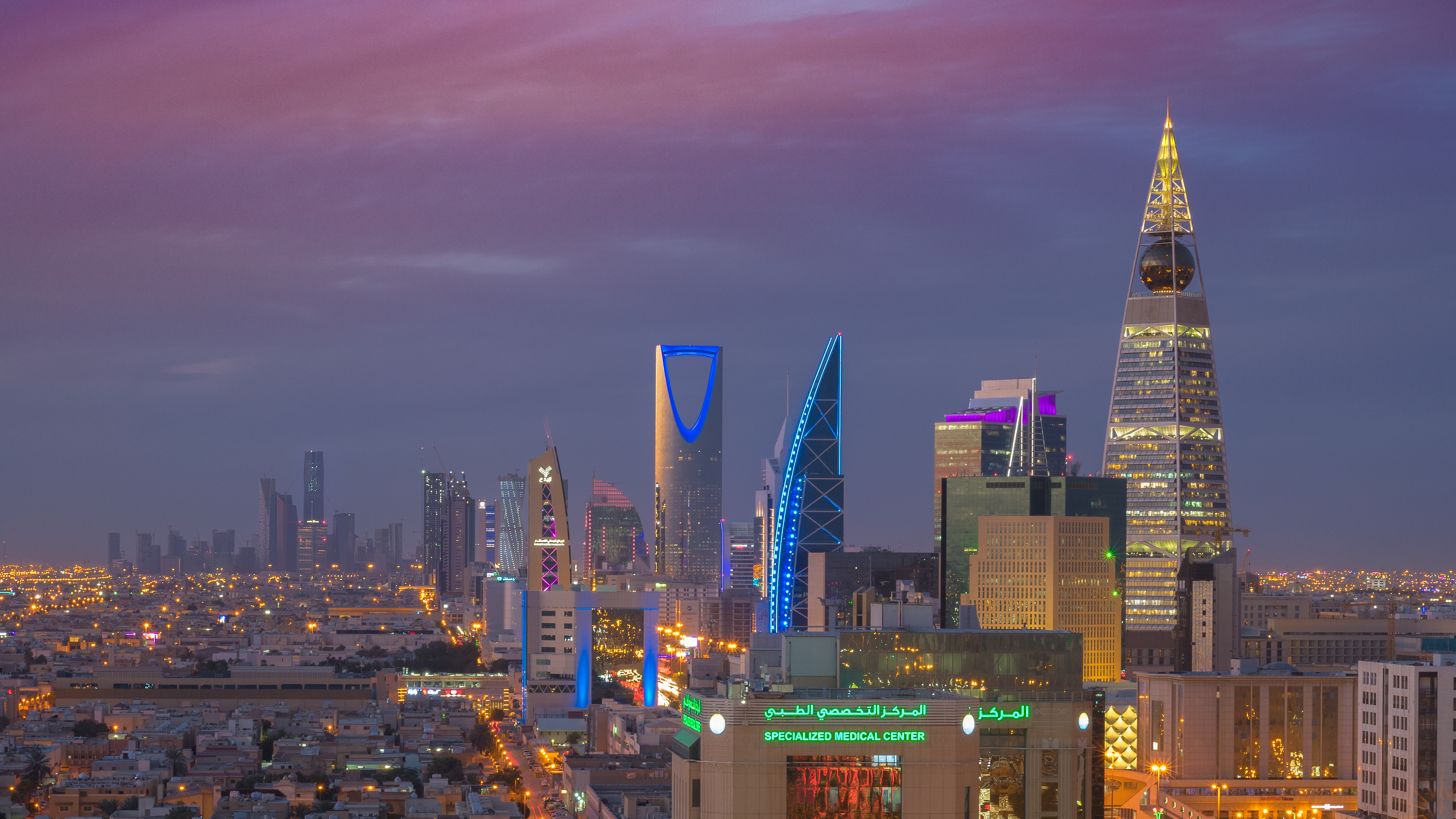
Riyadh, Saudi Arabia, the most populous city in the Arabian Peninsula

The ten most populous cities in the Arabian Peninsula are:

Rank	City	Population
1	(Saudi Arabia) Riyadh	7,009,100
2	(Saudi Arabia) Jeddah	3,751,700
3	(United Arab Emirates) Dubai	3,488,745
4	(Yemen) Sanaa	3,407,814
5	(Saudi Arabia) Mecca	2,427,900
6	(United Arab Emirates) Sharjah	1,785,684
7	(Oman) Muscat	1,650,319
8	(United Arab Emirates) Abu Dhabi	1,539,830
9	(Saudi Arabia) Dammam	1,545,420
10	(Saudi Arabia) Medina	1,477,000

== Gallery ==
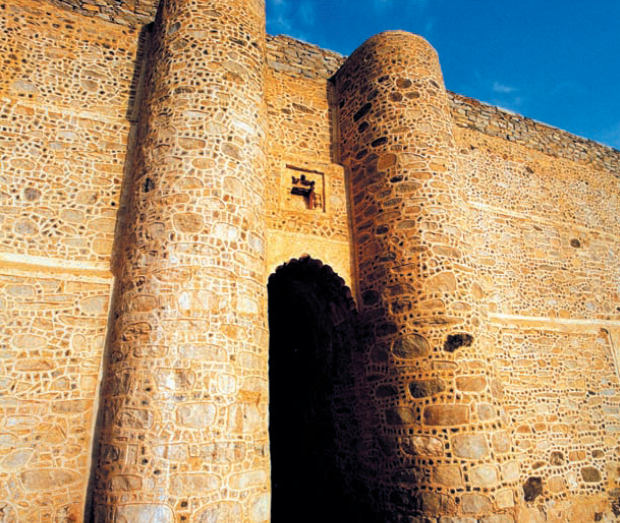
Ain Zubaydah was built to water the pilgrims in Mecca, Saudi Arabia by order of Zubaidah bint Ja'far.

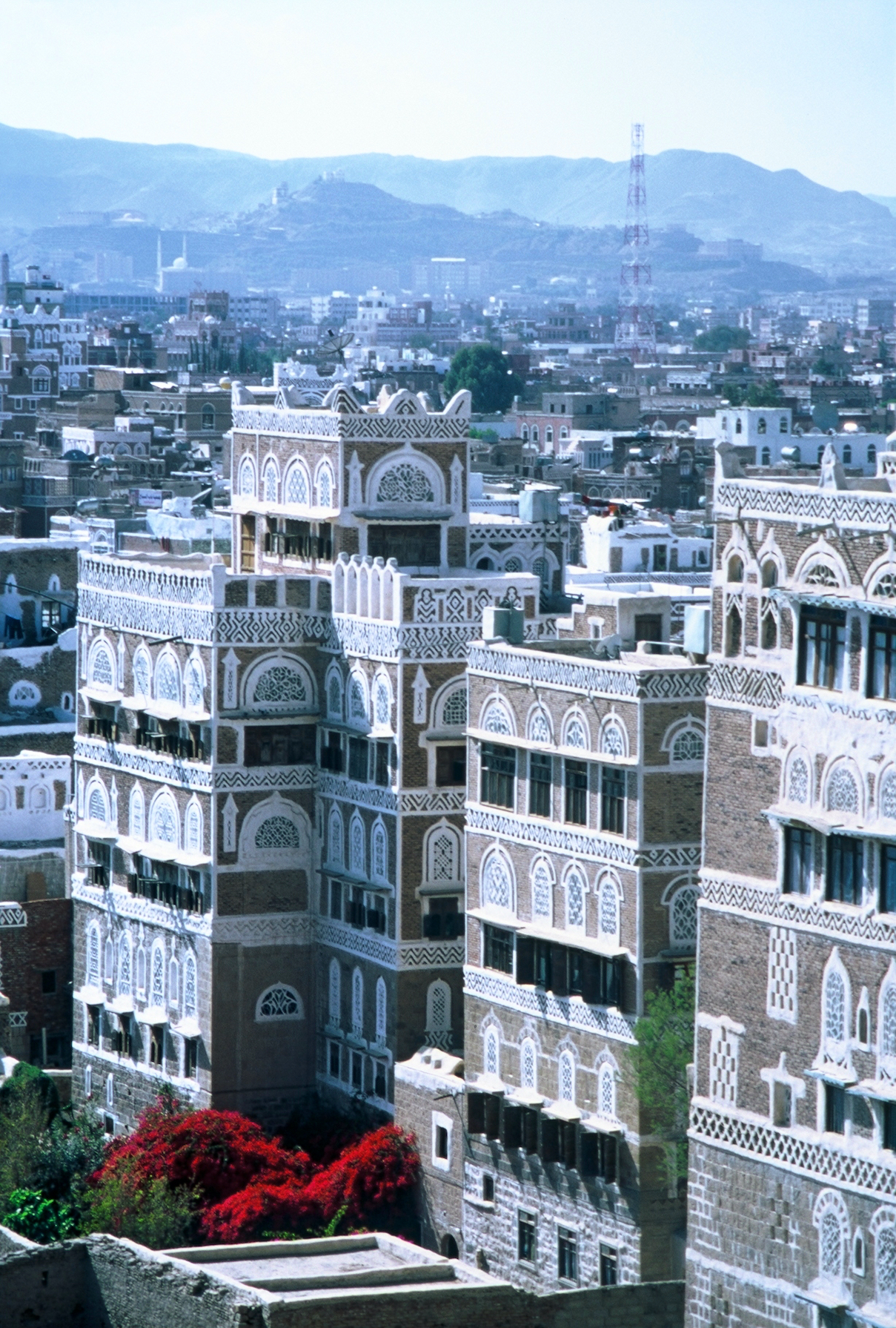
The Old City of Sanaa

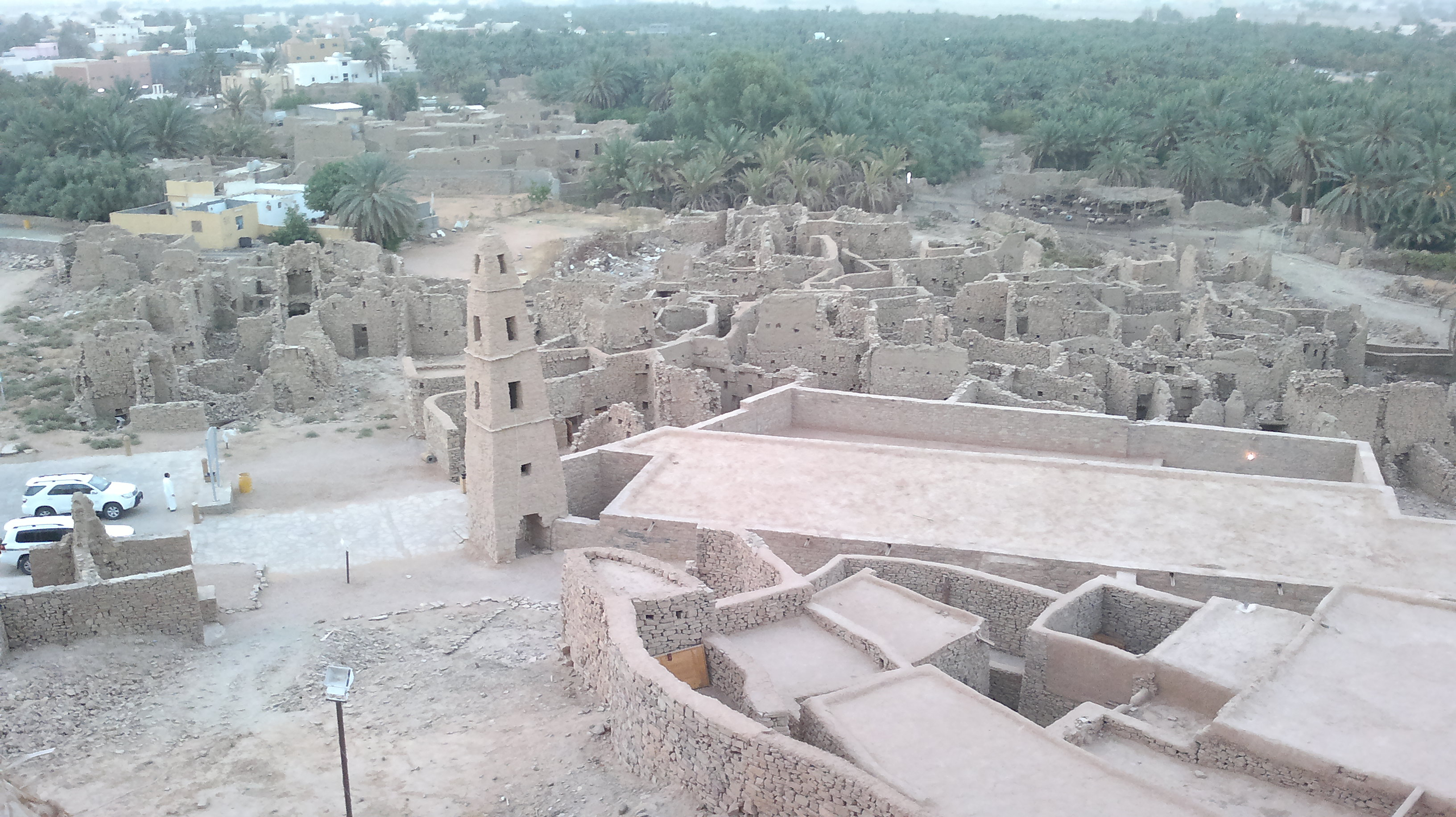
Omar Mosque in Dumat al-Jandal, Saudi Arabia

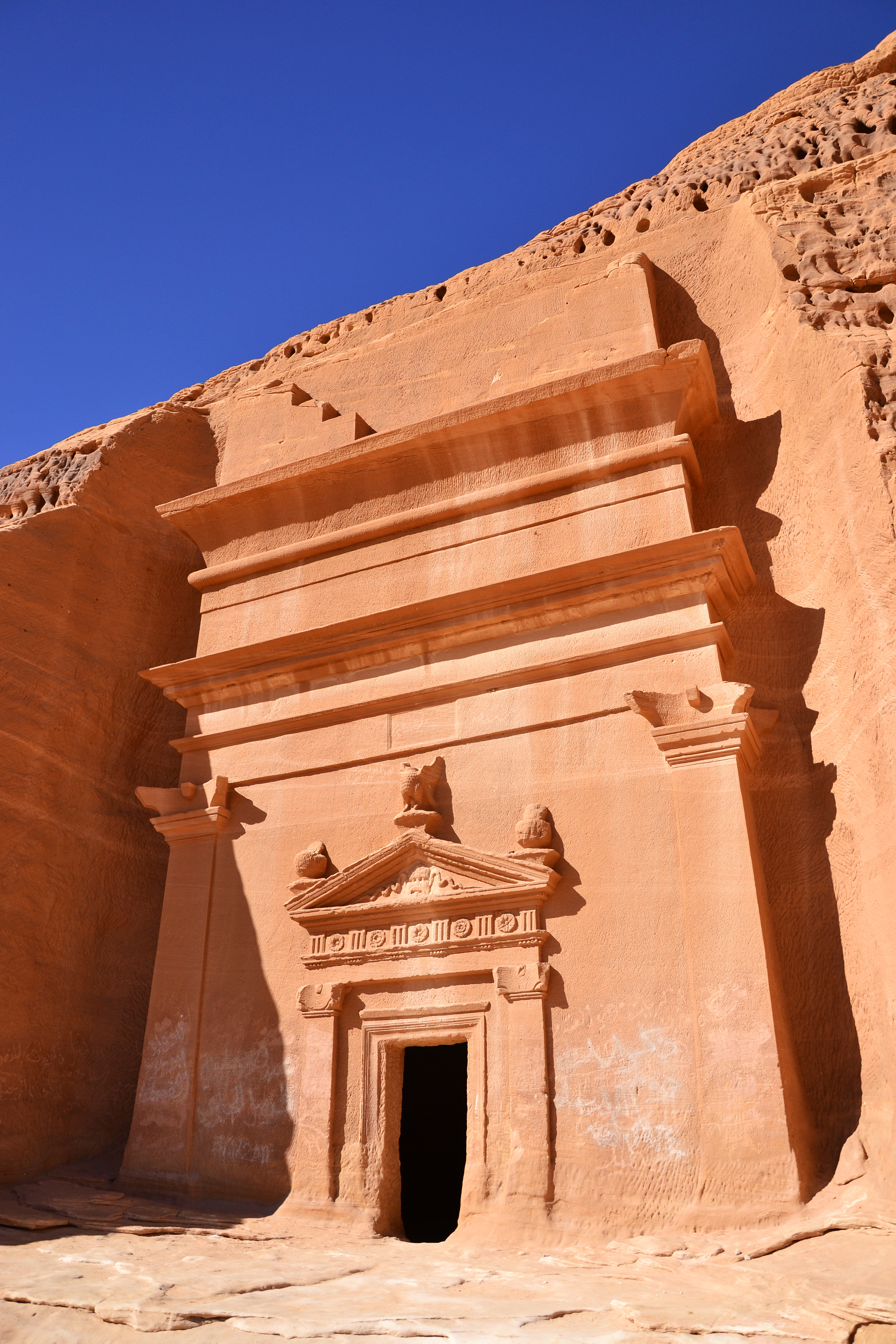
The facade of a tomb with its details and architectural elements in Hegra, Saudi Arabia

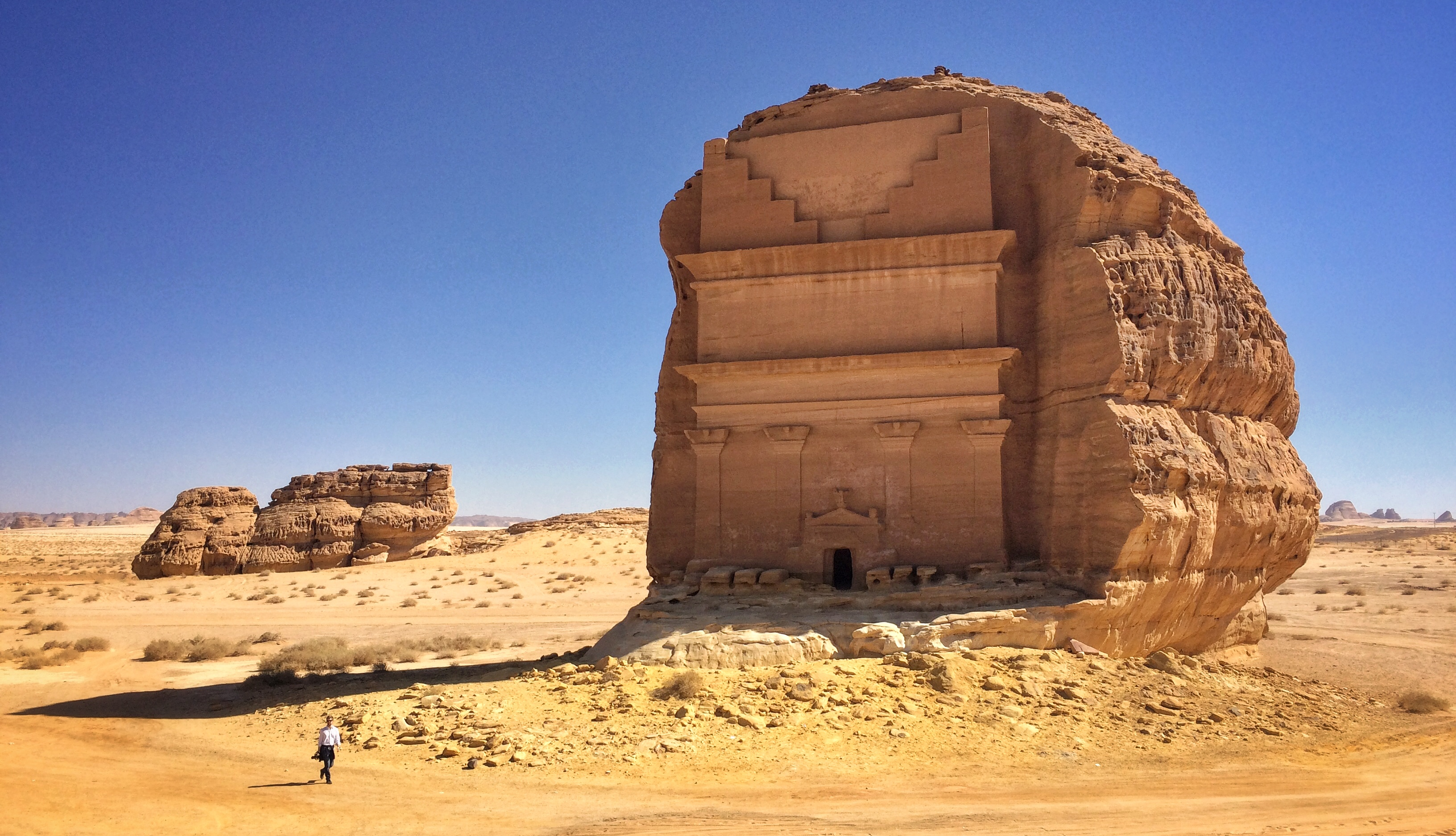
Qasr al Farid, tomb in Archeological site Mada'in Saleh, Al-`Ula, Saudi Arabia

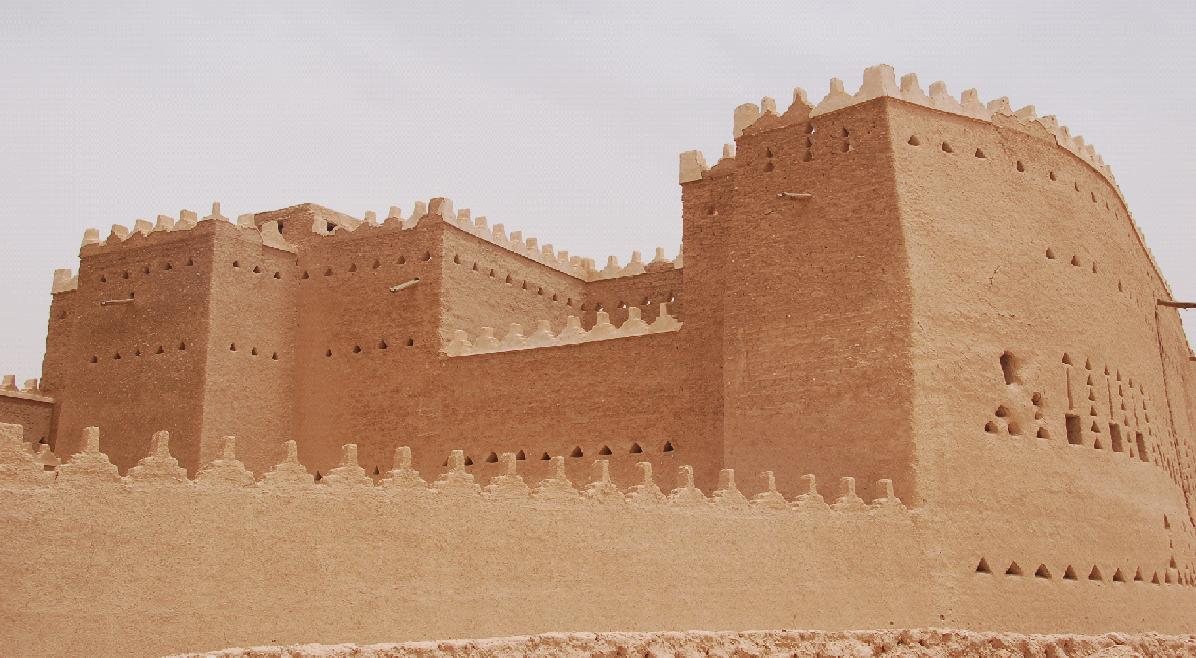
Diriyah, the capital of the first Saudi state

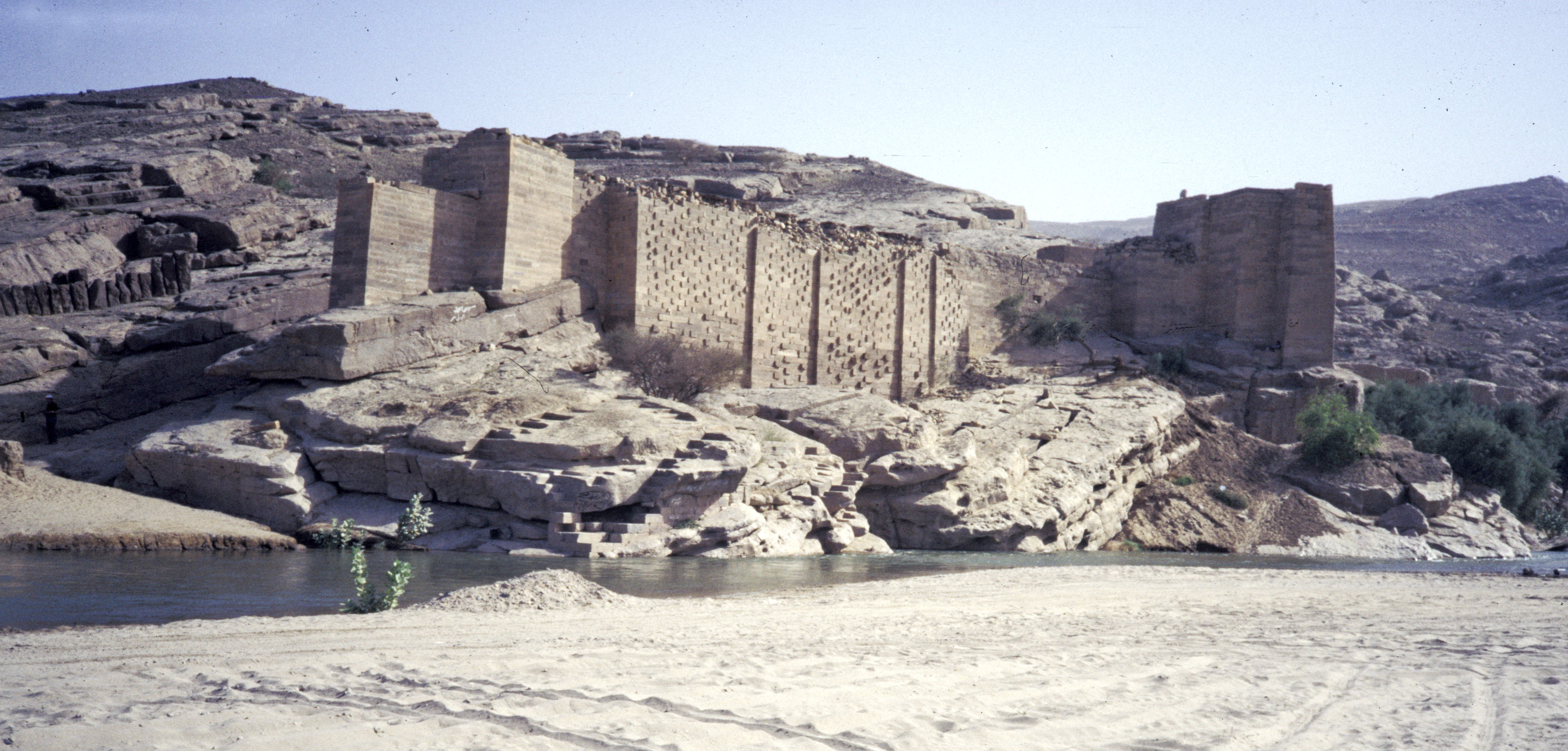
Dam of Ma'rib

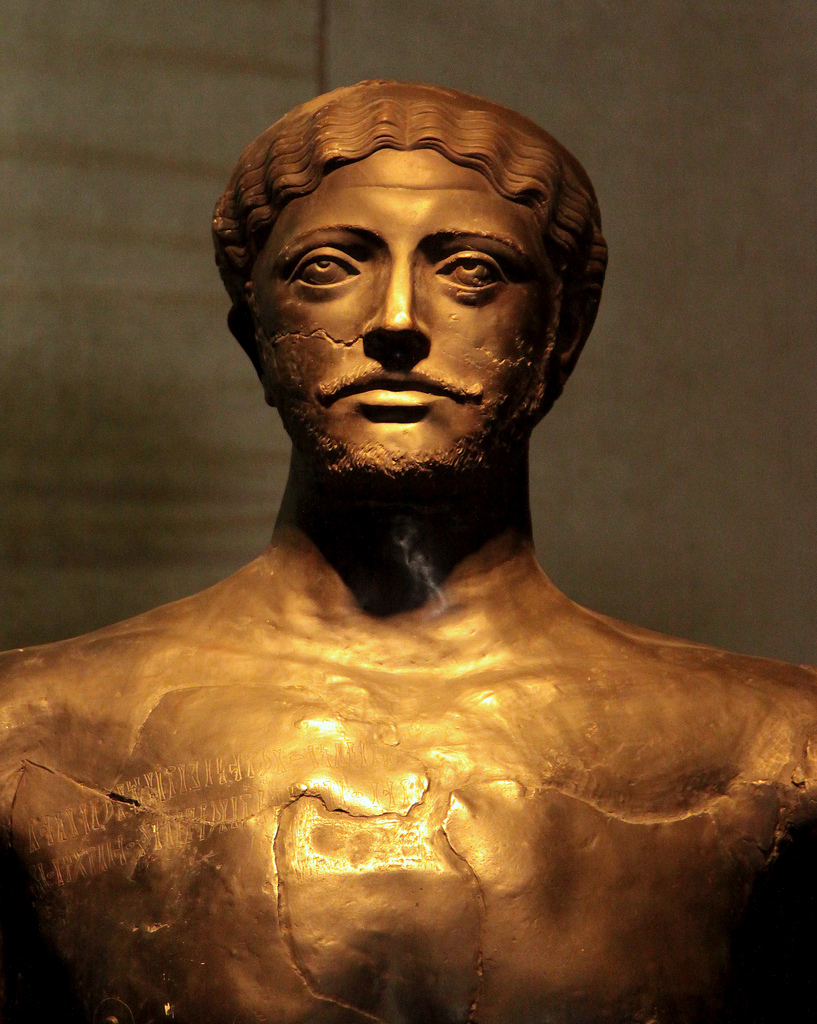
Himyarite King Dhamar'ali Yahbur II

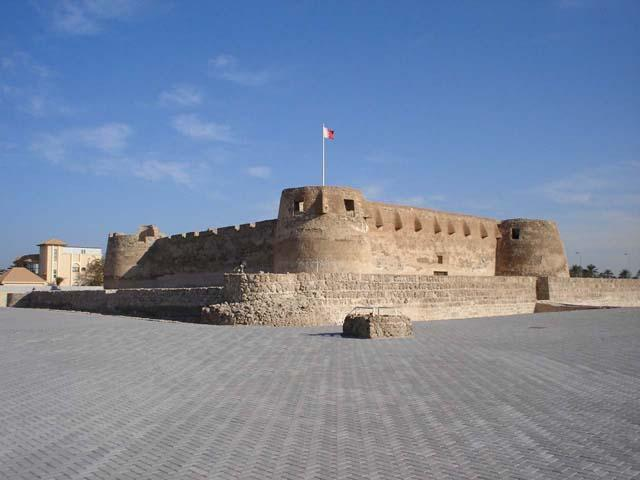
Arad Fort in Bahrain

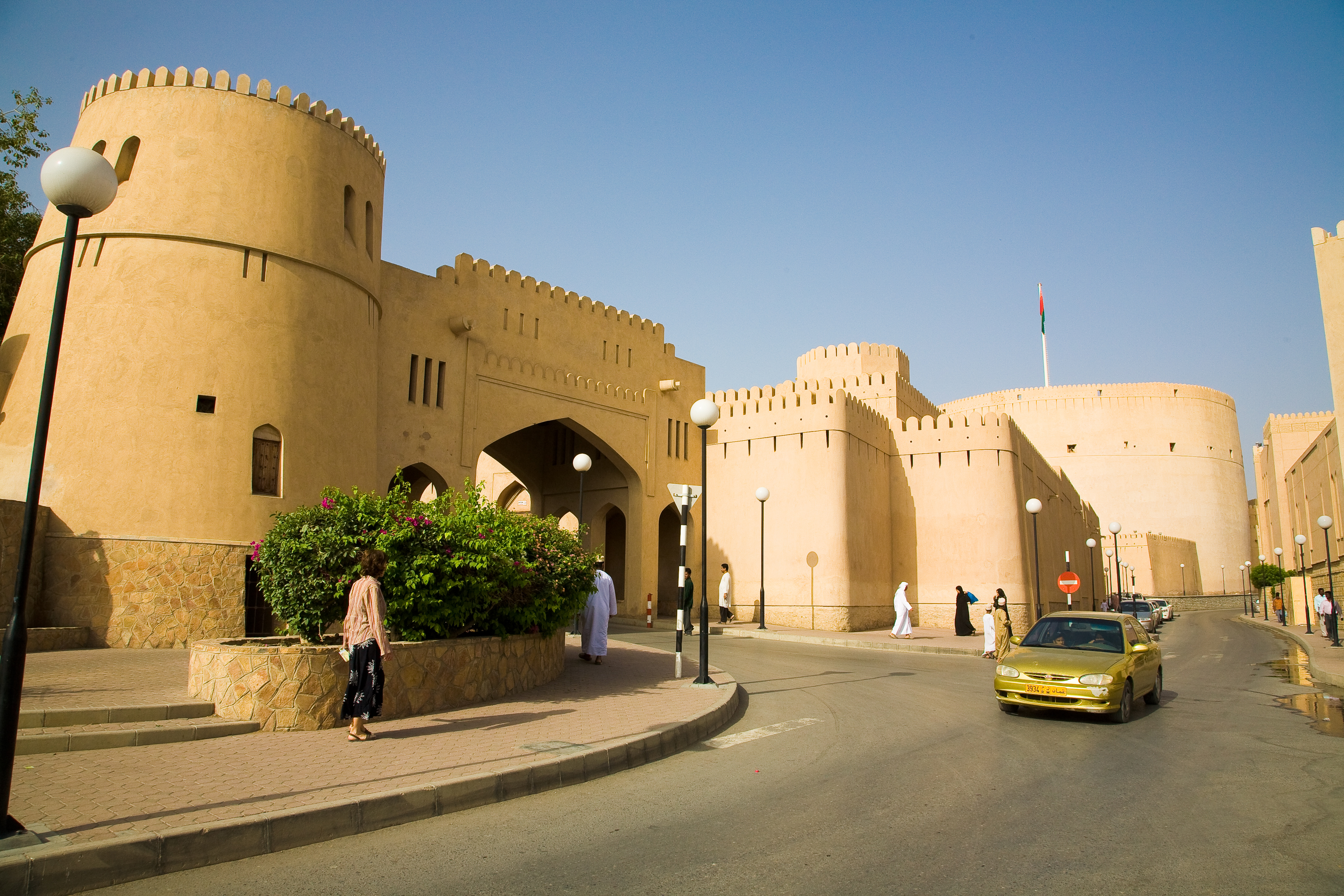
Nizwa Fort in Oman

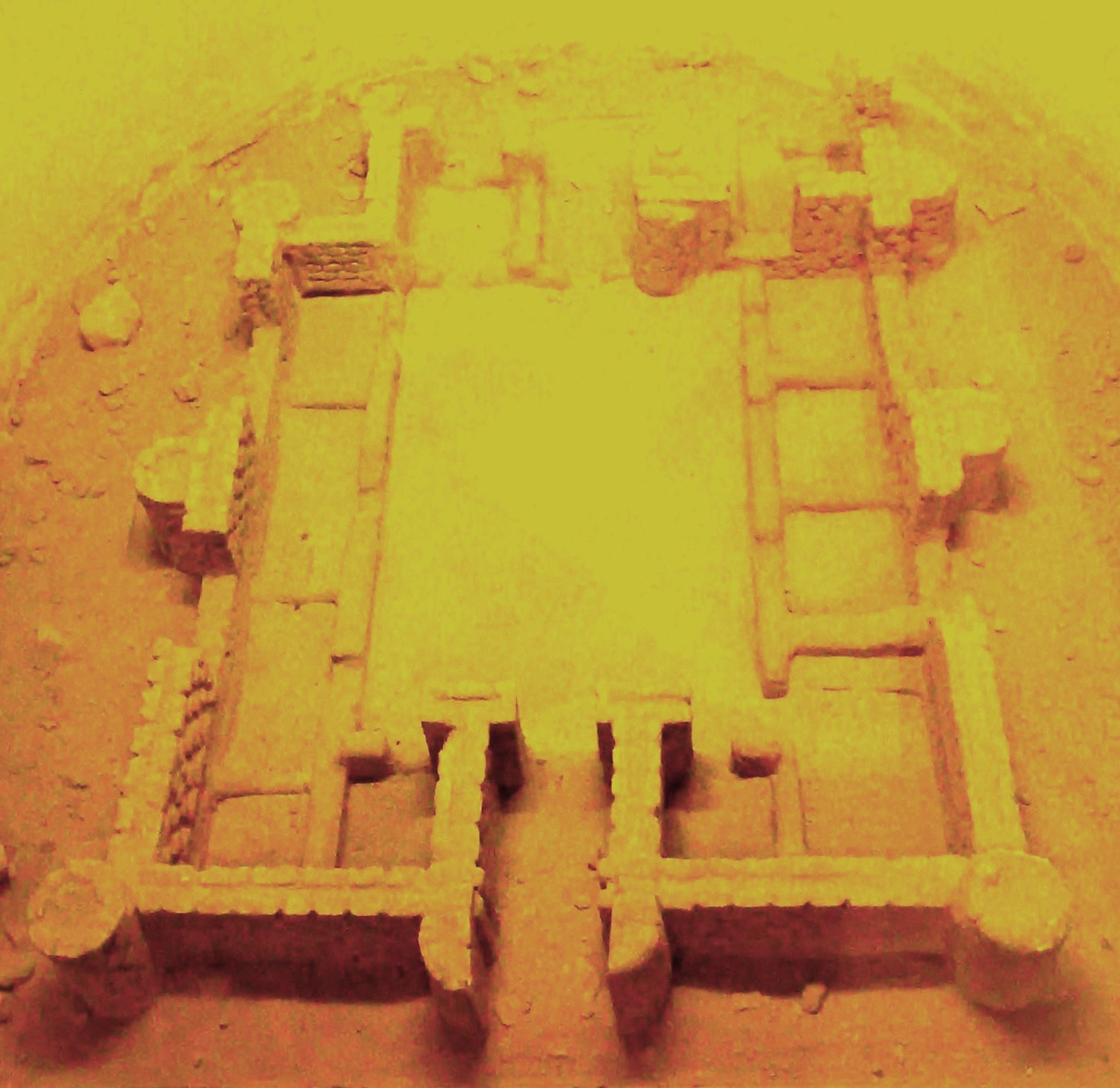
The ruins of Umayyad city in the historic Jumeirah district of Dubai

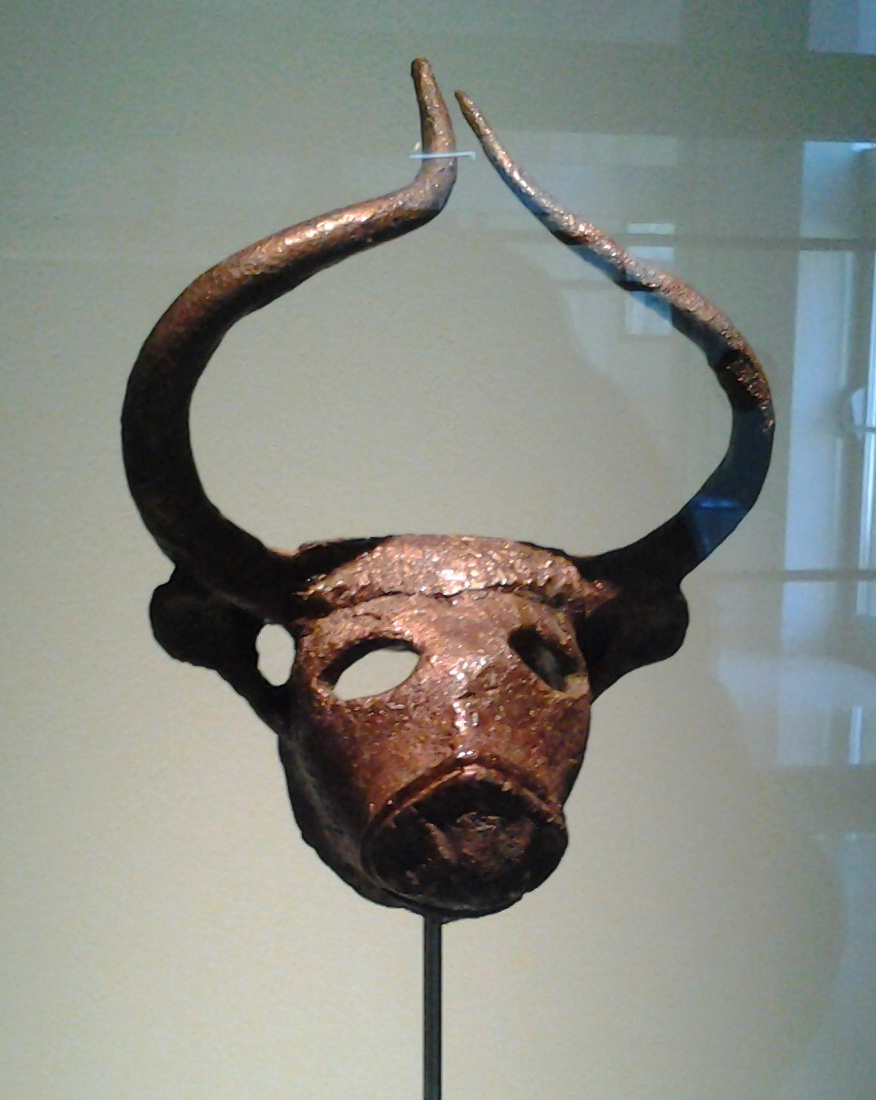
Bull's head, made of copper in the early period of Dilmun (ca. 2000 BC), Bahrain

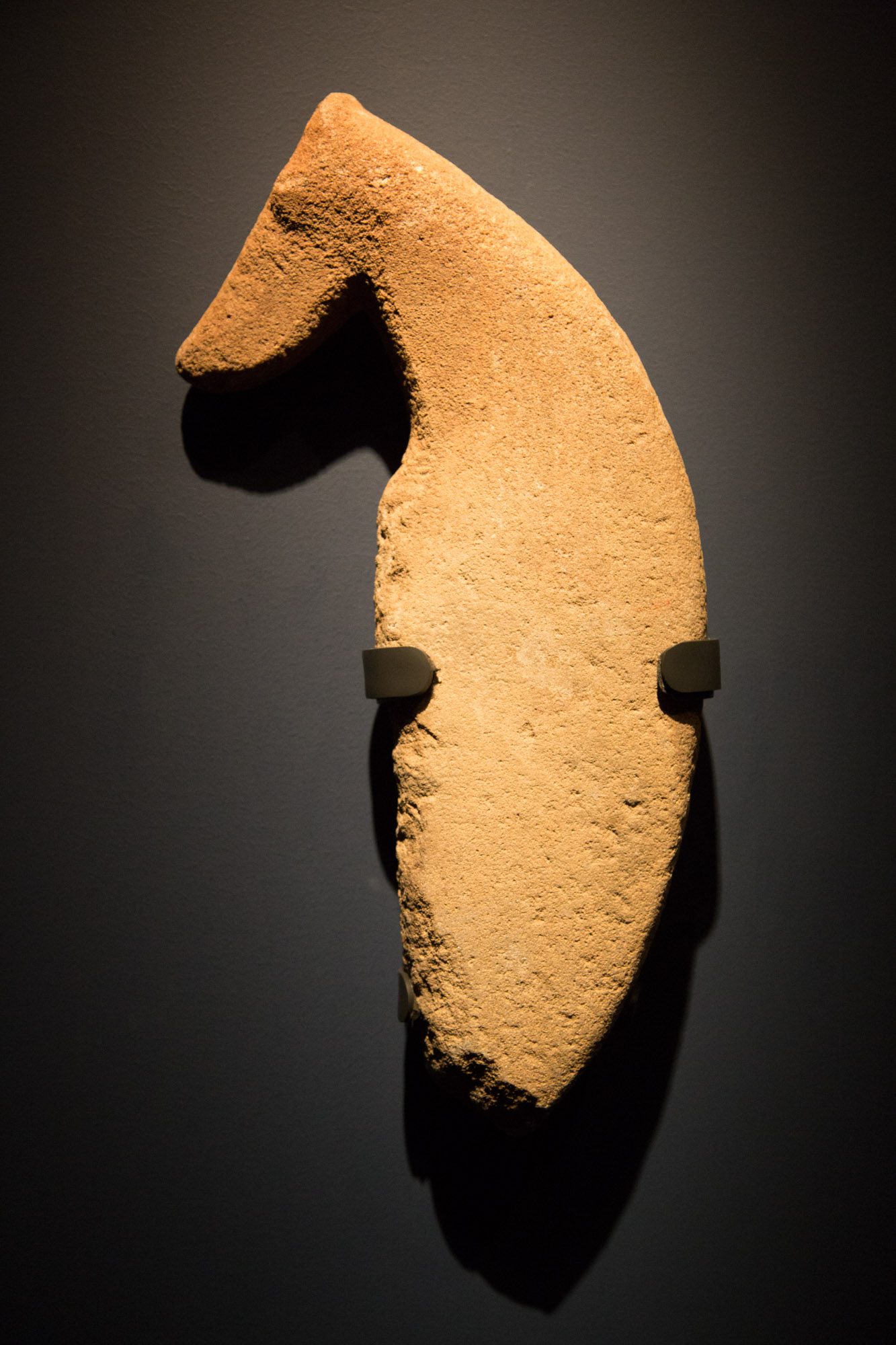
The head and body of a Saluki is made of stone from the Al-Magar civilization, in the Neolithic period (about 8000 BC)

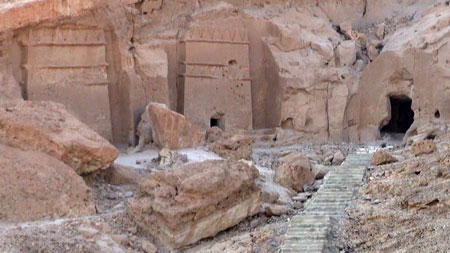
Midian

== See also ==
- Achaemenid Arabia
- Ancient history of Yemen
- Arabian Gulf Cup
- Arab League
- Arab world
- Eastern Arabia
- European exploration of Arabia
- Gulf Cooperation Council
- Iram of the Pillars
- Kingdom of Aksum
- List of Arabian cities by population
- List of peninsulas
- Mashriq
- Musandam Peninsula
