= List of Arabian cities by population =

This is a list of cities on the Arabian Peninsula by population, based primarily on national census estimates of the number of residents residing within the limits of a municipality (i.e. city proper); if recent official data is unavailable, reputable non-governmental estimates are used instead. The minimum population for a city to be included is 500,000. The geographic definition of Arabia is used, encompassing the countries of Kuwait, Oman, Qatar, Saudi Arabia, the United Arab Emirates, and Yemen in their entirety, as well as the island nation of Bahrain and the southern regions of Iraq and Jordan. (Note: By city proper, neither Bahrain nor Southern Jordan currently have any cities with a municipal population higher than 500,000.) C stands for Census, E stands for estimate.

== Map ==
Location of the cities. Green dots represent national capital cities, red dots represent other cities.

== Table of largest cities in Arabia ==
Rank	City	Image	Country	Population	Census/Est. Year
1	Riyadh		Saudi Arabia	7,009,100	2022C
2	Jeddah		Saudi Arabia	3,751,700	2022C
3	Dubai		United Arab Emirates	3,488,745	2022C
4	Sanaa		Yemen	3,407,814	2024E
5	Mecca		Saudi Arabia	2,427,900	2022C
6	Sharjah		United Arab Emirates	1,785,684	2022C
7	Muscat		Oman	1,650,319	2023C
8	Abu Dhabi		United Arab Emirates	1,539,830	2022C
9	Dammam		Saudi Arabia	1,532,300	2022C
10	Medina		Saudi Arabia	1,477,000	2022C
11	Basra		Iraq	1,400,000	2018E
12	Aden		Yemen	1,079,670	2023E
13	Kuwait City		Kuwait	1,003,003	2012E
14	Taiz		Yemen	940,600	2023E
15	Taif		Saudi Arabia	913,400	2022C
16	Doha		Qatar	796,947	2010C
