= Dhu Samawi =

Pre-Islamic deity in South Arabia

Dhū Samuī (Musnad: 𐩹𐩪𐩣𐩥𐩺, sometimes 𐩪𐩣𐩺), whose name literally means "He of the Heavenly", was a pre-Islamic deity that was worshipped in South Arabia. He was a kind of sky deity who resided in the heavens. He was also associated with camels, especially by the Bedouins.

== Symbolism ==
The name Dhū Samāwī means The Heavenly One in the Sabaic language. He was seen as a sky deity. He was also named Malik al-Dhū Samāwī, which meant that he was also regarded as a Lord of the Heavens.

== Worship ==
Dhu Samawi was the great god of the city of Najran during the period of the Kingdom of Saba. Due to the dominance of Najran in the early caravan trade, the cult of Dhu Samawi went on to spread throughout Yemen, from Baraqish in the north, to Sawam in the south. This included the adoption of this god by the Ma'in Kingdom. Sources mention two shrines dedicated to this god in Najran: the Ragmatum Rock (Ragmatum being another name for Najran), and a Kaʾbatān. The latter may have been converted into the Kaaba of Najran during the Christian period of the city.

One temple for the worship of Dhu Samawi has been uncovered at the settlement Haram, located in Yemen. One inscription from Haram addressed to Dhu Samawi reads:

Hawliyyat, slave of [the clan of] Sulaym, has confessed and done penance to Dhu Samawi, lord of Bayan, for having worn an unclean cloak and a soiled woollen garment. And she hid from her masters what she had committed. As for Dhu Samawi may he reward her with favour. [For her part] she has submitted and humbled herself, and she has made an offering in expiation and paid a fine.

== See also ==
- List of pre-Islamic Arabian deities

== Sources ==
- Hoyland, Robert G. (2002), Arabia and the Arabs: From the Bronze Age to the Coming of Islam, Routledge, ISBN 978-1-134-64634-0
- Robin, Christian Julien (2010). "Nagrān vers l'époque du massacre : notes sur l'histoire politique, économique et institutionnelle et sur l'introduction du christianisme (avec un réexamen du Martyre d'Azqīr)". In Beaucamp, Joelle; Briquel-Chatonnet, Francoise; Robin, Christian Julien (eds.). Juifs Et Chretiens En Arabie Aux Ve Et Vie Siecles: Regards Croises Sur Les Sources. Peeters. pp. 39–106.
