= Baraqish =

Baraqish براقش Yathill
- Town
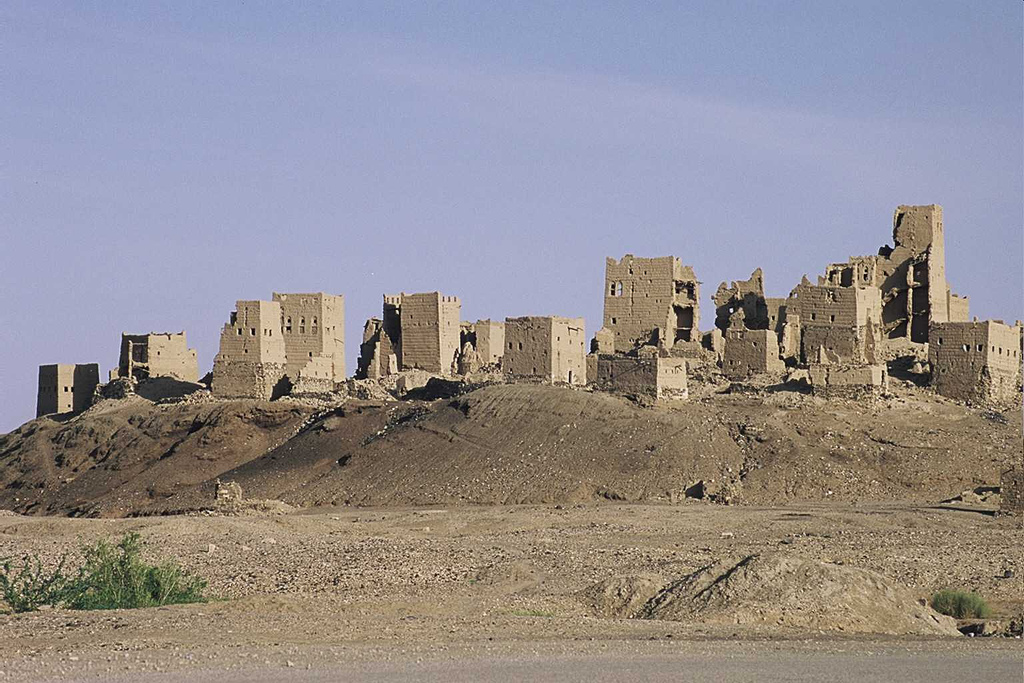

- Location in Yemen
- Coordinates: 16°0′N 44°48′E
- Country: Yemen
- Governorate: Al Jawf Governorate
- Time zone: UTC+03:00 (Yemen Standard Time)

Barāqish or Barāgish or Aythel (Arabic: براقش) is a town in north-western Yemen, 120 miles to the east of Sanaa in al Jawf Governorate on a high hill. It is located in Wādī Farda(h), a popular caravan route because of the presence of water. It was known to the Greeks and Romans as Athlula (or Athrula), from the ancient Sabaean yθl (probably vocalized Yathill).

Barāqish was inhabited as early as the Bronze Age, one generation building their houses on the ruins of the earlier ones. In the main area of the site, there still remain the ruins of a dome, a mosque, a well and tower, as well as many pottery shards and pieces of glass. People lived in the town up to the 1960s, but it has since been abandoned, and is at present occupied by the military.

== History and Archaeology ==
=== History ===
Its origins are very archaic, possibly 1000 BCE, but it reached its peak of importance in about 400 BCE when it became the capital of the Minaean Kingdom.

Paleolithic ceramic finds indicate the area was inhabited from at least the 10th century BC.

The city itself was dominated by Saba in the 6th century BC. and is mentioned in a document of Yitha'amar Bayyin II, mentioning a rebellion in the city.

The Minaean kingdom eventually established itself in the 5th century BC, and the city is cited in a document dated to 343 BC. However, the Minean kingdom was recaptured by the Saba kingdom in the 2nd century BC.

The city was the capitol of the Minaean kingdom until they shifted their capital to Qarnāwu at some time. However, and Yathill remained a sort of religious center for them.

Under the Minean kingdom it was an important stop on the incense route. The ancient city of Yathill was surrounded by a wall 14 meters high, much of which is still visible today; this wall had 57 towers and two gates. Inscriptions mention that the wall was rebuilt by the Sabaeans in 450 BCE. The city was retaken by the Saba in the 2nd century BC.

The city was taken by the Romans under Aelius Gallus, Augustus's general. They left quickly, however, due to disease and poor water. According to Strabo and Cassius Dio, Gallus was under orders from Augustus to quell tribes to the north. The tomb of a Roman cavalryman, P. Cornelius, has been found there.

The city was taken by Hadhramaut in 242.

=== Archaeology ===
The ruins of a temple in the southern part of the city are considered by archaeologist to have been dedicated to the god Athtar. There is a necropolis near this temple, which contains numerous grave stelae. The temple is very typical of the Minaean style and consists of 16 columns and beams. There are also a number of ancient inscriptions in the South Arabian alphabet through the city.

There is another temple in the center of the city but only four of its columns are still erect.

The city is mentioned in a number of Minaean language temple stelae across southern Arabia.

From 1989-90 and 2003-07, a team of Italian archaeologists excavated a temple with its roof intact in Baraqish. Inside they found a number of stone tables or altars with bulls' heads at each end, which are believed to have been a sanctuary to a god of healing.

In 2015, the city was reported as being badly destroyed when the Saudi Arabian military, supported by the US and Britain, bombed the site of Baraqish, which was occupied by Houthi forces.
