= Yitha'amar Bayyin II =

Yitha'amar Bayyin II was a Sabean King of what is today Southern Yemen. He was also known as the son and successor of Sumuhu'ali Yanuf III. He is known for the construction of the Dam of Ma'rib according to inscriptions at the dam, and he rebuilt the fortification of the city Yathill.

He was a strong leader and is known from inscriptions to have pushed the Bayyin tribes to the south and defeated the Yarfath and Dahas tribes, who had rebelled against his ally Qataban.

Then he struck the up-and-coming He also wages successful campaigns against the Ma'in Empire.

== Date of rule ==
Hermann von Wissmann sets his reign around 510 BC while Kenneth A. Kitchen dates him to around 365-350 BC. Yitha'amar's successor was probably Karib'il IV (Karab El Watar) I Contemporary with Sennacherib.
