= Ma'in =

Ancient Yemeni kingdom

Kingdom of Ma’in مملكة معين
- 8th century BCE–1st centuries CE
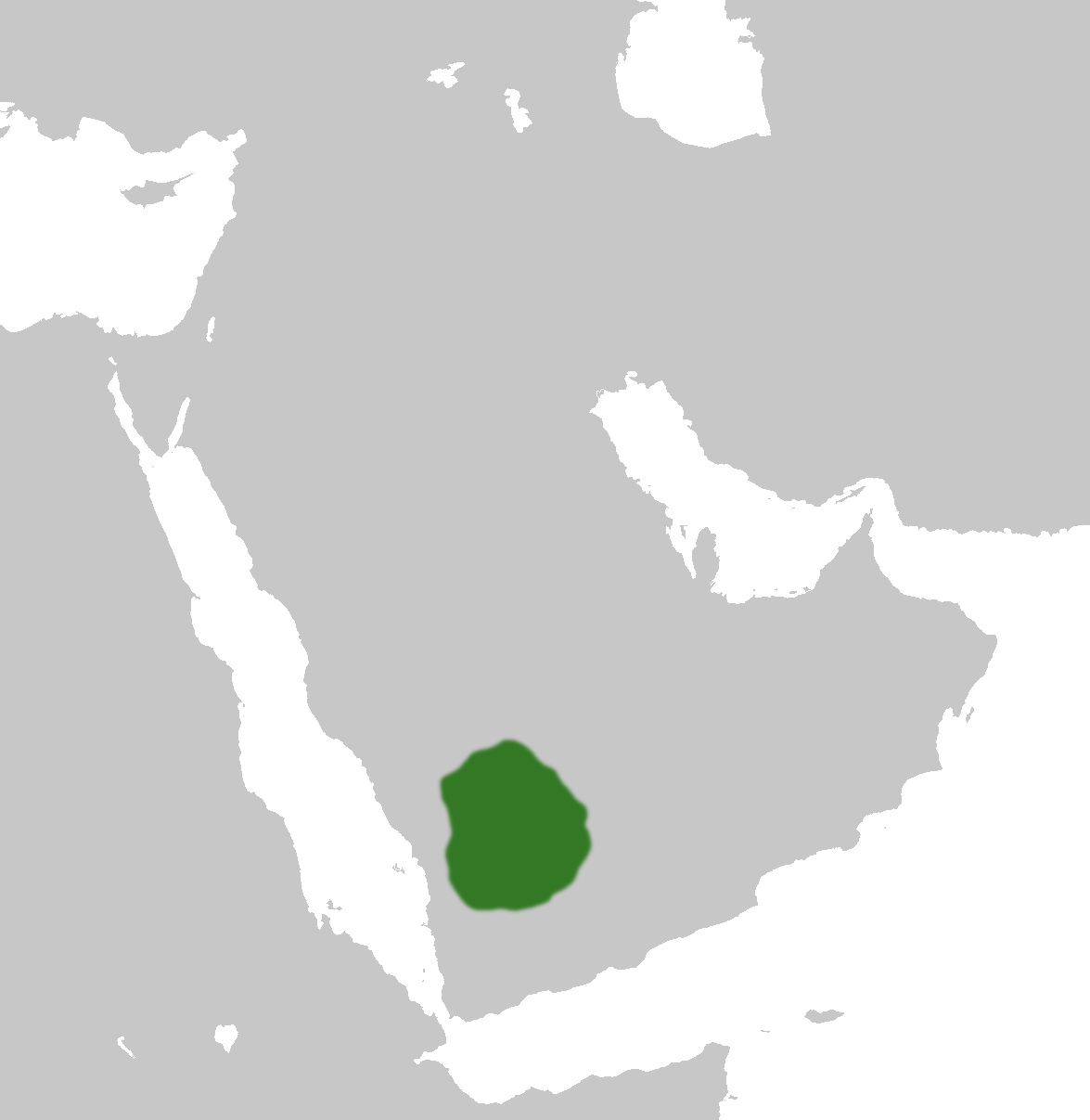
- Capital: Qarnawu
- Common languages: Minaean language
- Religion: Pre-Islamic Arabian religions
- Demonym: Minaean(s)
- Government: Monarchy
- History
  - Established: 8th century BCE
  - Disestablished: 1st centuries CE

Ma'in (Minaean: 𐩣𐩲𐩬; Arabic: معين, romanized: Maʿīn) was an ancient South Arabian kingdom in modern-day Yemen. It was located along the strip of desert called Ṣayhad by medieval Arab geographers, which is now known as Ramlat al-Sab'atayn. Wadd was the national god of Ma'in. The spoken language was Minaic. The kingdom appears in the historical record in the 8th century BCE, and transition from a city-state to kingdom in the last quarter of the 7th century BCE. The date of the end of Ma'in is heavily disputed, but the most popular hypothesis places its demise in the 1st century CE.

The Minaean people were one of four ancient Yemeni groups mentioned by Eratosthenes. The others were the Sabaeans, Ḥaḍramites and Qatabānians. Each of these had regional kingdoms in ancient Yemen, with the Minaeans in the north-west (in Wādī al-Jawf), the Sabaeans to the south-east of them, the Qatabānians to the south-east of the Sabaeans, and the Ḥaḑramites further east still.

== History ==
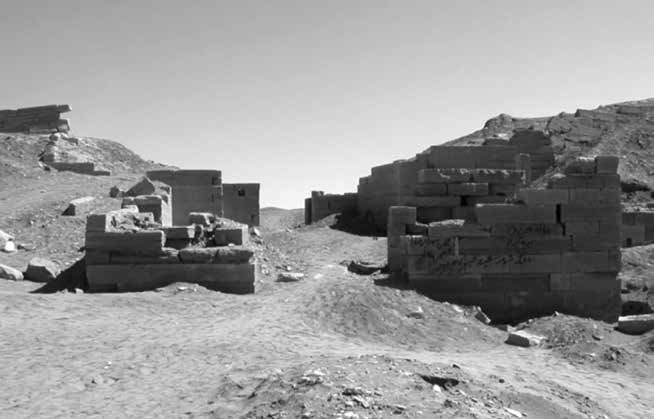
Ruins of the western gate of Qarnawu

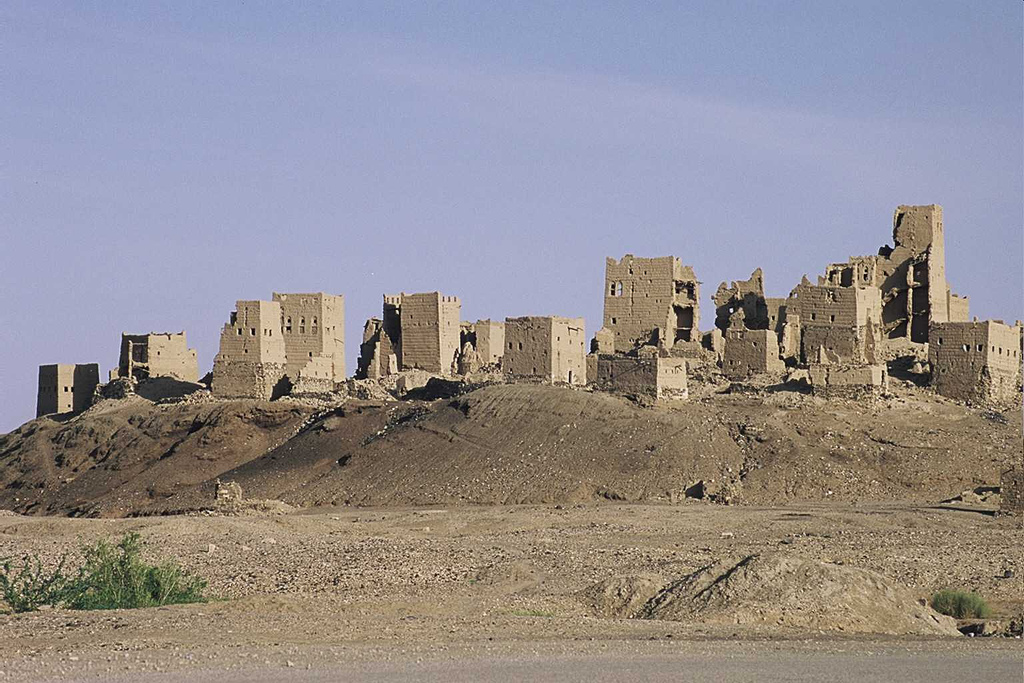
Ruins of Yathill (Baraqish)

Ma'in appears in the 8th century BCE, not yet as a kingdom, settled in the town of Qarnawu (modern-day Jawf). This was one of many city-states of the Jawf region, and it shared with the other Jawf states its language, writing school, art, architecture, social and political institutions, and religion. The city-state was ruled over by a king selected from its influential families. Ma'in enjoyed peaceful relations with the more well-established Kingdom of Saba. Thanks to this, and the Sabaean defeat of the Nashshan kingdom in the 7th century BCE, Ma'in's power grew and the Minaeans were able to project their power into nearby territories, transforming them into a kingdom. Inscriptions from the Temple of Shaqab al-Manaṣṣa record the names of many of the kings from this period. As the seventh century BCE closed, and the sixth century BCE opened, the alliance with Saba broke down. Ma'in joined Yathill to form a confederation and established alliances with other South Arabian kingdoms. This laid the basis for Ma'in's ability to manage an international frankincense in the coming centuries.

A chronological historical reconstruction of what happened from the fifth centuries BCE onwards is still not possible, although plenty of information is known about it. One apparent fact is that in this time, Ma'in becomes the most active of the South Arabian kingdoms in land trade. The kingdom of Ma'in in this time was mainly based on an alliance between two cities: Ma'in and Baraqish. Inscriptions from these cities end with invocations to the gods and the tribes of the two cities. Other tribes and cities also entered into the orbit of the Minaean kingdom, but only played a secondary role compared to these cities. The most prominent example is Nashshan, the most important city of the Jawf valley. It was absorbed under the dominion of the Kingdom of Ma'in between the 6th and 4th centuries BC. This event also coincided with the replacement of the traditional pantheon of Nashshan with the one from Ma'in, although Nashshan was to restore its old pantheon when Ma'in eventually fell. Another religious development was the spread of the high god of Najran, Dhu Samawi, throughout the Minaean kingdom, from Baraqish in the north, to Sawam in the south, presumably due to the outsized role placed by the Najran oasis in trade.

After the collapse of the Minaeans, the Nabataean Kingdom took over long-distance trade in the region, as part of their expansion southwards from their capital city Petra.

== International trade ==
The Minaeans were the only one of the South Arabian kingdoms to describe their trade in their known inscriptions. Ruling over a small kingdom, they focused on commerce, neglecting the rounds of war and coin minting that their neighbours were engaged in. Ma'in was famous for its trade in aromatics, with Greco-Roman observers naming aromatic products in reference to them, an example being "Minaean frankincense". The caravans of Ma'in reached Central and Northern Arabia, Egypt, Palestine, Phoenicia, Mesopotamia and Greece. The importance of Minaean traders is mentioned in a legal document from the capital of the capital of Qataban. The Ma'in trade surpassed that of the Saba by the mid-1st millennium BCE. Ma'in also took control over the commercial caravan route along the Red Sea (from the Hijaz, to Dedan, to the Mediterranean Sea), from Saba. At the same time, it had to begin contending with attacks by Sabaeans against its caravans, particularly on the route from Ma'in to Najran, but Saba ultimately suffered from this development.

Minaean trade extended throughout Arabia and even extended to more distant, international polities, where colonies were set up to manage trade with Ma'in and the revenue that it brought in. The main evidence for this is a group of about seventy discovered monumental inscriptions beyond the borders of the Kingdom of Ma'in composed in the Minaic script, which was the written form of the Minaean language. A study of these inscriptions shows that the Minaeans established communities in these far-flung regions to manage their international trade apparatus. The Minaean communities set up abroad were able to retain their cultural and political identities in the process. The majority of these inscriptions are from northwest Arabia, at the oasis of al-Ula in the Lihyanite Kingdom, numbering about fifty. Two inscriptions are also known from a trading station the Minaeans set up at Qaryat al-Faw, located in Central Arabia. One read: "Hạ̄niʾ and Zaydʾīl of (the clan of) Ḫaḏab set up the altar of Waddum and the gods of Maʿīn in Delos. (Greek) (Belonging to) Oddos, the god of the Minaeans. For Oaddos." These inscriptions have also been discovered as far as Egypt and at the Greek island of Delos. The Delos inscriptions show that Minaean merchants had set up an altar for their national god, Wadd, and composed the inscription in Minaic.

== Political structure ==
As the Kingdom of Ma'in was not a military or political power, the king (assisted by his council) was invested with limited powers. The king did not mint coins, was not involved in the construction of walls or fortifications around the major cities, and did not have a palace. Instead, Ma'in remained a merchant republic that emerged out of an alliance of polities.

== See also ==
- Ancient history of Yemen
- Ancient South Arabian art
- Yemen
- Sabaean Kingdom
- Qataban

== Bibliography ==
- Arbach, Mounir; Rossi, Irene (2012). "From city-state to kingdom: History and chronology of Ma'īn between the VIII and the VI centuries BC". Orientalia. 81 (4): 318–339.
- Arbach, Mounir (2023). "Nashshān [Kingdom and Tribe]". Thematic Dictionary of Ancient Arabia.
- Avanzini, Alessandra (2016). By land and by sea: a history of South Arabia before Islam recounted from inscriptions. L'Erma Di Bretschneider.
- Finster, Barbara (2017). "The Material Culture of Pre‐ and Early Islamic Arabia". In Flood, Finbarr Barry; Necipoğlu, Gülru (eds.). A Companion to Islamic Art and Architecture. John Wiley & Sons. pp. 61–88.
- Hoyland, Robert (2002). Arabia and the Arabs: From the Bronze Age to the Coming of Islam. Routledge.
- Prioletta, Alessia; Arbach, Mounir (2024). "Minaeans at Ḥimā: The Epigraphic Corpus and Its Historical, Linguistic and Cultural Implications". Arabian Archaeology and Epigraphy: 1–24.
- Robin, Christian Julien (2010). "Nagrān vers l'époque du massacre : notes sur l'histoire politique, économique et institutionnelle et sur l'introduction du christianisme (avec un réexamen du Martyre d'Azqīr)". In Beaucamp, Joelle; Briquel-Chatonnet, Francoise; Robin, Christian Julien (eds.). Juifs Et Chretiens En Arabie Aux Ve Et Vie Siecles: Regards Croises Sur Les Sources. Peeters. pp. 39–106.
- Robin, Christian Julien (2010b). "Antiquity". In Al-Ghabban, Ali Ibrahim; Andre-Salvini, Beatrice; Demange, Francoise; Juvin, Carine; Cotty, Marianne (eds.). Roads of Arabia. Archaeology and History of the Kingdom of Saudi Arabia. Musée du Louvre. pp. 80–99.
- Rossi, Irene (2014). "The Minaeans beyond Ma'īn". Supplement to the Proceedings of the Seminar for Arabian Studies. 44: 111–124.
- Sorenson, Soren Lund; Geus, Klaus (2023). "Minaeans in the Mediterranean. Reevaluating two Old South Arabian inscriptions from Delos". Arabian Archaeology and Epigraphy. 34 (1): 128–132.
- Weimar, Jason (2021). "The Minaeans after Maʿīn? The latest presently dateable Minaic text and the God of Maʿīn". Arabian Archaeology and Epigraphy. 32 (376–387): https://onlinelibrary.wiley.com/doi/abs/10.1111/aae.12176.
