= Qarnawu =

- 𐩤𐩧𐩬𐩥
- Location within Yemen
- 16.1281°N 44.8153°E
- Location: Yemen
- Region: Al Jawf Governorate

Qarnāwu (Old South Arabian: 𐩤𐩧𐩬𐩥, qrnw, reconstructed Qarnāwu, Ancient Greek Κάρνα Kárna) is the name of an ancient city situated in present day Jawf in the north of Yemen, near the modern city of Ma'īn (Arabic معين).

Qarnāwu was presumably founded at the time the Minaean Kingdom appeared in about 500 BCE; after the end of Sabaean rule over Ma’in in about 400 BCE Qarnāwu became the capital of Ma'īn for a time. Qarnāwu was set on a mound, about 10 meters in height and had a rectangular layout each side of which measured about 350 × 240 meters; it was traversed by an absolutely straight main street, leading from the west to the east gate. The interior was carefully planned. At the end of the Minaean Kingdom in the 1st century BCE, Qarnāwu lost its importance, and was probably abandoned not long after.

== See also ==
- Minaeans
- Minaean Language
- Ancient History of Yemen

== Bibliography ==
- Ahmed Fakhry: An archaeological journey to Yemen. Cairo 1951–52
- F. Bron: Inventaire des Inscriptions sudarabiques. Tome 3. Maʿīn (fasc. A–B). Paris-Rome 1998.
