= Hermann von Wissmann (geographer) =

Hermann von Wissmann (2 September 1895 – 5 September 1979) was a German-Austrian explorer of Arabia.

== Life ==
Von Wissmann was born in Etzweiler the son of the African explorer Hermann von Wissmann (with the same name). He studied in geography in Vienna and then made a name for himself with his research work concerning the problem of hill farmers in Ennstal. Between 1931 and 1939 he launched a number of expeditions, accompanied by Daniel van der Meulen to South Arabia, an area which would become the main emphasis of his research. He busied himself with the ancient geography and history of this region and developed a chronology for ancient South Arabia. He was in effect the strongest advocate for the so-called ‘Long Chronology’, which maintains that the beginnings of the Sabaean Kingdom date back to the 8th century BCE.

Wissmann, who also explored the south Chinese Province of Yunnan for a while, was one of the last true explorers, working in the style of the second age of discovery: he undertook long journeys by caravan, during which he worked with a compass and a pedometer, recording what he saw with a pencil. Finally, until his retirement in 1958, he was a full professor for geography at the University of Tübingen. He died in Zell am See.

== Works ==
- "Die bäuerliche Besiedlung und Verödung des mittleren Ennstales. Ein Beitrag zur Siedlungsgeographie der Ostalpen," in Petermanns Geographische Mitteilungen 3, 4 (1927), S. 65-69.
- Süd-Yünnan als Teilraum Südostasiens, Heidelberg et al. 1943.
- With Maria Höfner, Beiträge zur historischen Geographie des vorislamischen Südarabien (Abhandlungen der geistes- und sozialwissenschaftlichen Klasse der Akademie der Wissenschaften und der Literatur in Mainz, year 1952, No. 4). Verlag der Akademie der Wissenschaften und der Literatur in Mainz, Mainz 1953
- Zur Geschichte und Landeskunde von Alt-Südarabien. (Sammlung Eduard Glaser, Nr. III = Österreichische Akademie der Wissenschaften, philosophisch-historische Klasse, Sitzungsberichte, Band 246) Böhlaus, Wien 1964
- Arabien. Dokumente zur Entdeckungsgeschichte, Vol. l, Stuttgart 1965
- "Die Geschichte des Sabäerreiches und der Feldzug des Aelius Gallus," in: Hildegard Temporini, Aufstieg und Niedergang der römischen Welt. II. Principat. Neunter Band, Erster Halbband, De Gruyter, Berlin, New York 1976, Pp. 308–544
- Das Weihrauchland Sa’kalan, Samarum und Moscha, Viena 1977
- Die Geschichte von Saba. II. Das Grossreich der Sabäer bis zu seinem Ende im frühen 4. Jahrhundert v. Chr. (Österreichische Akademie der Wissenschaften, Philosophisch-historische Klasse. Sitzungsberichte, Vol. 402, edited by Walter W. Müller) Verlag der österreichischen Akademie der Wissenschaften Wien, Vienna 1982, ISBN 3700105169

== Biography ==
- Helmut Blume, "Hermann von Wissmanns Beitrag zur Arabienforschung," in: GZ 68 (1980), pp. 161–172
- Friedrich Huttenlocher, "Weg und Werk Hermann von Wissmanns," in: A. Leidelmair (Ed.): Hermann von Wissmann-Festschrift, Tübingen 1962, pp 11–34.
- A. Leidelmair; "Hermann von Wissmann zum Gedenken," in: Mitteilungen der Österreichischen Geographischen Gesellschaft 122 (1980), pp. 148–153.
- Daniel van der Meulen, "Mit Hermann von Wissmann in Südarabien," in: Leidelmair (Ed.): Hermann von Wissmann-Festschrift, Tübingen 1962, pp 35–41
