= Minaean language =

Ancient Semitic language of Yemen

Minaean
- Native to: Yemen
- Ethnicity: Minaeans
- Era: 800 BC – 100 AD
- Language family: Afro-Asiatic: Semitic; West Semitic; South Semitic?; Southwestern?; Ancient South Arabian; Minaean
- Writing system: Ancient South Arabian

Language codes
- ISO 639-3: Either: inm – Minaean xha – Harami
- Glottolog: mina1279 Minaean

The Minaean language (also Minaic, Madhabaic or Madhābic) was an Ancient South Arabian or 'Ṣayhadic' language spoken in Yemen in ancient times. The main area of its use may be located in what is now al-Jawf Governorate in northeastern Yemen, primarily in the Wadi Madhāb.

Most of texts in this language were composed by the people of Ma'in, but other civil-temple communities of the Wadi Madhāb (Nashshan, Kaminahu, Ḥaram, and Inabba') also used it as a literary medium.

== History ==
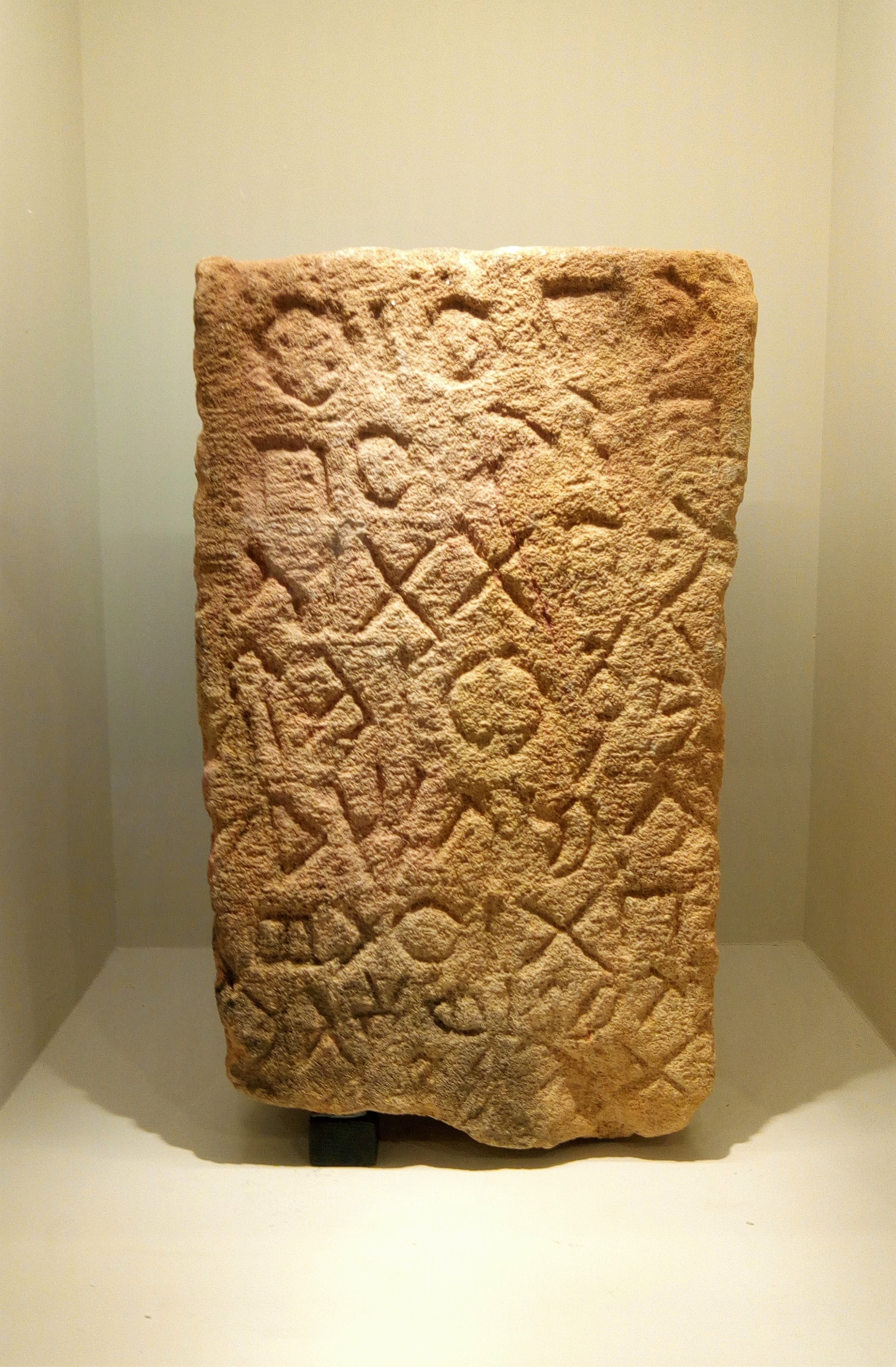
Minaean inscription from ancient oasis of Dēdan (now Al-'Ula).

The earliest Minaean inscriptions are contemporary with the earliest Sabaic ones, i.e. the 8th century BCE, though they are less numerous, and come from the cities along Wadi Madhaab, to the north-east of Marib. Minaean trading posts, and Minaean inscriptions are also found outside South Arabia, as in the ancient oasis of Dēdan (now al-'Ula, Saudi Arabia), and even on the Greek island of Delos and in Egypt. Minaean seems to disappear as a written language about the end of the 2nd century BCE.

== Phonology ==
The phonology of the ancient Minaean language seems to be essentially similar to that of the other Ancient South Arabian languages. One peculiarity of Minaean is that it writes the phoneme /s/ in foreign names as /ṯ/ (e.g., Delos becomes dlṯ), but maintains these as distinct phonemes in native words.

Minaean seems to insert an etymologically unexplained h in certain nominal endings, pronouns and particles; some plurals also exhibit this same feature: bhn and bhnt, plurals of bn (son). These may be plene writing of a long vowel other than /uː/ or /iː/.

== Grammatical features peculiar to Minaean ==
Due to the limited number of texts that have survived, many forms are not attested, though new texts may be discovered to provide more source material. In Minaean, external plurals seem to be especially common; an -h is often used at the end of words in the construct state, even in the singular.

=== Minaean nominal endings ===
	Construct	Indeterminate	Determinate
Sing. /broken plur.	-h, no ending	-(m)	-n
Dual	-y, -hy	-ny	-nhn, -nyhn
External Plural	-hw, -hy	-hn	

(Compare the table given under Sabaean language.)

=== Relative pronouns ===
	Masculine	Feminine
Singular	ḏy-	ḏt
Dual	ḏy	ḏtyn
Plural	'hl, hl	

=== Particles ===
Whereas Sabaean uses the preposition l- to mean "to(wards)", or to express the dative case, Minaean often has k- (compare Ḥaḑramitic h-). The particle k- has a prefixed s_{2} in Minaean, as in bn s_{2}-kḏ "from (the possibility) that ...". Minaean, like the other non-Sabaean languages also has a temporal conjunction mty ("when").

The Minaean negative particle, which has been so far badly attested, is lhm.

=== Verbs ===
Minaean is distinguished from the other Old South Arabian languages by having an extra form for verb stems with a reduplicated second radical, spelled fˁˁl (as in ˁlly, "raise").

==== Conjugation of the perfect tense ====
Minaean, like the other South Arabian languages, forms the perfect tense by adding suffixes. Unlike the other dialects, however, it does not write the dual and plural endings, they are therefore the same as the singular; for example: s_{3}l' ("he/they dedicated").

== Bibliography ==
- Leonid Kogan and Andrey Korotayev: Sayhadic Languages (Epigraphic South Arabian). Semitic Languages. London: Routledge, 1997, p. 157-183.
- Andrey Korotayev. Ancient Yemen. Oxford: Oxford University Press, 1995. ISBN 0-19-922237-1
