= Timna =

Archaeological site in Yemen

- تمنع (Arabic)
- Location within Yemen
- 15°00′06″N 45°48′57″E
- Location: Yemen
- Region: Shabwah Governorate

Timna (Qatabānic: 𐩩𐩣𐩬𐩲, romanized: tmnʿ, Timnaʿ; Arabic: تمنع, romanized: Timnaʿ) is an ancient city in Yemen, the capital of the Qataban kingdom.

During ancient times, Timna was an important hub in the famous Incense Route, which supplied Arabian and Indian incense via camel caravan to ports on the Mediterranean Sea, most notably Gaza, and Petra.

An American excavation of Timna took place in the 1950s and is chronicled in the book "Qataban and Sheba" by the American archaeologist Wendell Phillips.

In 1962, an alabaster head and a block with writing were found by a British squadron on patrol. The head was discovered about 500 yards from the main wall and gate, the only structures left standing. The block was sent to the Manchester Museum and in a letter by the curator it was described as being a link between Egyptian and Arabic.

== See also ==
- Beihan, the modern name for Timna
