= Conquests of Karib'il Watar =

Date	Late 7th Century BCE
Location	South Arabia
Result	Sabaean Victory * Disappearance of Awsan * Destruction of Muratta'
Territorial changes	Majority of West South Arabia annexed by the Sabaeans alongside Qataban, Hadhramawt and Haram

Belligerents
Sabaean Kingdom; Supported by: Qataban; Hadhramawt; Haram	Kingdom of Awsan; Nashshan; Nashaq; Ma'afir; Muhammir; Amir

Commanders and leaders
Karib'il Watar; Hanba bin Halaw; Yada'il; Wara'il	Sumhuyafa'

Strength
Unknown	Unknown

Casualties and losses
Unknown	First Campaign: 3,000 Killed; 8,000 Captured; Second Campaign: 16,000 Killed; 40,000 Captured; Third Campaign: 2,000 Killed; 5,000 Captured; Fourth Campaign: 2,500 Killed; 1,000 Captured; Sixth Campaign: 1,000 Killed; Eighth Campaign: 8,000 Killed; 17,000 Captured; 350,000 Livestock stolen
- Hanba was sent by the Haramite King, Yadhmurmalik

The Conquests of Karib'il Watar refers to a series of eight conquests and campaigns by the Sabaeans led by Karib'il Watar during the late 7th century BCE against the surrounding South Arabian kingdoms. These conquests politically unified South Arabia for the first time, bringing about a period of Sabaean domination over the region that lasted for centuries. South Arabia would not be unified again until the rise of the Himyarite Kingdom, a thousand years later.

The conquests are all known from two lengthy inscriptions commissioned later in Karib'il Watar's life, called RES 3945 and RES 3946, which were found at the Temple of Almaqah at Sirwah, one of the two main urban centers of Saba at the time in addition to its capital, Marib.

== Background ==
In the late seventh century BCE, Karib'il Watar ascended to the throne of the Sabaean Kingdom and took on the title of the mukkarib of Saba. The title mukarrib had previously replaced the earlier mlk ("king"), denoting a position of even greater authority: a ruler who exerts his dominion over the surrounding tribes and kingdoms.

== First Campaign ==
The first campaign by Karib'il Watar was into the city-state of Ma'afir, taking Sawa before burning the cities of Ma'afir. The Sabaeans killed 3000 of the residents, seized 8000 as captives and imposed double the tribute owed (including livestock and cattle). Ma'afir was conquered by the Sabaeans.

== Second Campaign ==
After the success of his previous campaign, Karib'il Watar began a war against the Kingdom of Awsan by invading Wusr. His army plundered the cities belonging to Awsan eventually leading Karib'il to reach Muratta' palace after conquering Datinat Mayasr and executing the council chiefs of Awsan alongside 16,000 of the population with the capture of 40,000 Awsanites, effectively destroying the Awsan kingdom.

== Third Campaign ==
Soon after returning from the second campaign, he went on an expedition and conquered the city-state of Dahas and ceded many of his conquered territories to his allies Qataban, led by Wara'il, and Hadhramawt, led by Yada'il, whom had supported him during his expansion into Awsan.

== Fourth Campaign ==
As a result of the aggression by the city Kahid Dhu-Sawt against Lzw and Hadhba' who were under the protection of Karib'il Watar, The city was plundered and destroyed by the Sabaeans.

== Fifth Campaign ==
Nashshan was sacked and burnt by Karib'il Watar, devastating the cities of 'Ushar and Bayhan.

== Sixth Campaign ==
Karib'il Watar launches a sixth campaign and builds a wall around the cities of Nashshan and Nashaq to isolate them, by order of Athtar, for three years and became Ruler of Nashaq before going on route to Nashshan. The Sabaeans (with the help of Hanba bin Halaw who was sent by King Yadhmurmalik of Haram) lay siege on the Nashshanites and annex several of their territories alongside all that belonged to Sumhuyafa' (King of Nashshan). Karib'il looted the city as well as Sumhuyafa's Palace and imposed tax upon them as well as a forced conversion into belief in the national gods of Saba. Karib'il later ceded the Kingdom of Nashshan to Yadhmurmalik of Haram as reward for aiding him by sending the commander Hablas.

== Seventh Campaign ==
Karib'il raided and annexeed unidentified kingdoms such as Ydhn, Gzbt and 'rb before imposing taxes upon them.

== Eighth Campaign ==
After the deaths of the Sabaean nobles at the hands of the Muhamirites and the Amirites, the Sabaean army invaded Muhamir and took their cities, burning them and looting them. Karib'il seized their cities and taxed them before ordering the execution of all Muhamirite communes.

== See also ==
- List of wars and battles in pre-Islamic Arabia
- Sabaean Kingdom
- Karib'il Watar

== Sources ==
- Nebes, Norbert (2023). "Early Saba and Its Neighbors". In Radner, Karen; Moeller, Nadine; Potts, D. T. (eds.). The Oxford History of the Ancient Near East: The Age of Persia. Vol. 5. Oxford University Press. pp. 299–375. ISBN 978-0-19-068766-3.
- Robin, Christian Julien (2002). "Saba' and the Sabaeans". In Simpson, John (ed.). Queen of Sheba, Treasures from Ancient Yemen. The British Museum Press. pp. 51–58.
