= Haram (Yemen) =

Archaeological site in Yemen

- Kharibat Hamdān
- Location within Yemen
- 16.174444°N 44.786667°E
- Location: Yemen
- Region: Wādī Madhab, Al Jawf Governorate

Haram (Arabic: هرم; Old South Arabian 𐩠𐩧𐩣 hrm-m, with mimation Haramum) (known today as Kharibat Hamdān and Kharibat ʾl ʿAlī) is an ancient city in the north of al-Jawf in modern-day Yemen, at about 1100 metres above sea level. It is bordered by the Yemen Highlands to the north, in the west by the ancient Kaminahu (present day Kamna), in the east by the ancient Qarnāwu (modern Ma'īn), and in the south by the Ghayl, otherwise known as the village of al-Ḥazm.

== History ==
In early times Haram was an independent political entity, which by the early 7th century BC was a vassal of the Kingdom of Saba' to the south and of its ruler Karab El Watar. During the war of Saba' against Awsān and the city states of Nashan and Nashaq, the Haramite king Yadhmurmalik supported Saba' with an army under the leadership of one General Hanba from the clan of Naʿman. It is from this time that the temple of Banāt 'Ād dates, it is situated in front of the gates of Haram, and contains many dedicatory inscriptions, including some to the Haramite god Mutibbnatyan. At the time of the founding of the Kingdom of Ma'īn at the latest, the capital of which, Qarnāwu, was only 6 kilometers away, Haram lost its importance. After the end of the Minaean Kingdom, it regained its importance for a while under Sabaean rule. It is not clear just when Haram was abandoned.

A stela of Yatha' Amar Watar dated to about 715 BC, tells that he invaded the area and took the town. It reads

Yatha amar Watar son of Yakrubmalik mukarrib of Saba dedicated to Aranyada' the patron when Aranyada came back from the territories of Aranyada' and of Nashshan and avenged Nashshan at the expense of Kaminahu because Nashahn had maintained the alliance of Almaqah and of Aranyada', of Yatha amar and of Malikwaqah, of Saba of nashshan, because of ... of god and parton of pact and alliance.

== Kings of Haram ==
The order of succession is mostly unknown.

- Yadhmurmalik along with Watar'il
- Yadhmurmalik along with Bi'athtar (allied to Karib'il Watar I., c. 685 BC)
- Watar'il
- Yaschhurmalik Nabat (?)
- Watar'il Dharihan, son of Yadhmurmalik
- Yuhar'il (?)
- Ma'adkarib Raydan, son of Hwtrʿṯt

== Culture ==
Haram was in Wādī Madhāb, to the north-east of Ma'rib. It was a town in ancient South Arabia. Haram and its neighbours, Nashan, Kaminahu and Inabba' were all civil temple settlements and city states, and inscriptions in all four towns are in the Minaean language.
