= Sheba =

Ancient South Arabian kingdom

Kingdom of Sheba Kingdom of Saba 𐩪𐩨𐩱 (Sabaic) سبأ (Arabic)
- ~1000-800 BCE–275 CE
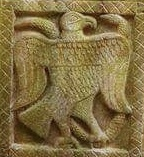
- Emblem

- Map of Sheba in blue in South Arabia
- Capital: Marib; Sanaa
- Official languages: Sabaic
- Religion: South Arabian polytheism
- Demonym: Sabaeans
- Government: Monarchy
- Mukarrib (list of rulers)
  - 730–710 BCE: Yatha' Amar Watar
  - 620–600 BCE: Karib'il Watar
  - 120–130 CE: Ilīsharaḥ Yaḥḍub I
- History
  - Established: ~1000-800 BCE
  - Disestablished: 275 CE
Succeeded by
Himyar; Dʿmt
- Today part of: Yemen; Eritrea; Ethiopia

Sheba, (Note: /ˈʃiːbə/; Hebrew: שְׁבָא, romanized: Šəḇāʾ;) or Saba, (Note: Sabaean: 𐩪𐩨𐩱, romanized: SBʾ; Arabic: سبأ, romanized: Sabaʾ; Geʽez: ሳባ, romanized: Sabaʾ) was an ancient South Arabian kingdom that existed in Yemen before 275 CE. It likely began its existence between c. 1000 BCE and c. 800 BCE. Its inhabitants were the Sabaeans, (Note: Sabaean: 𐩪𐩨𐩱, romanized: s¹bʾ; Arabic: ٱلسَّبَئِيُّوْن, romanized: as-Sabaʾiyyūn; Hebrew: שְׁבָאִים, romanized: Šəḇāʾīm) who, as a people, were indissociable from the kingdom itself for much of the 1st millennium BCE. Modern historians agree that the heartland of the Sabaean civilization was located in the region around Marib and Sirwah. In some periods, they expanded to much of modern Yemen and even parts of the Horn of Africa, particularly Eritrea and Ethiopia. The kingdom's native language was Sabaic, which was a variety of Old South Arabian.

Among South Arabians and Abyssinians, Sheba's name carried prestige, as it was widely considered to be the birthplace of South Arabian civilization as a whole. The first Sabaean kingdom lasted from the 8th century BCE to the 1st century BCE: this kingdom can be divided into the "mukarrib" period, where it reigned supreme over all of South Arabia; and the "kingly" period, a long period of decline to the neighbouring kingdoms of Ma'in, Hadhramaut, and Qataban, ultimately ending when a newer neighbour, Himyar, annexed them. Sheba was originally confined to the region of Marib (its capital city) and its surroundings. At its height, it encompassed much of the southwestern parts of the Arabian Peninsula before eventually declining to the regions of Marib. However, it re-emerged from the 1st to 3rd centuries CE. During this time, a secondary capital was founded at Sanaa, which is also the capital city of modern Yemen. Around 275 CE, the Sabaean civilization came to a permanent end in the aftermath of another Himyarite annexation.

The Sabaeans, like the other South Arabian kingdoms of their time, took part in the extremely lucrative spice trade, especially including frankincense and myrrh. They left behind many inscriptions in the monumental Ancient South Arabian script, as well as numerous documents in the related cursive Zabūr script. Their interaction with African societies in the Horn is attested by numerous traces, including inscriptions and temples dating back to the Sabaean presence in Africa.

The Hebrew Bible references the kingdom in an account describing the interactions between King Solomon of Israel and a figure identified as the Queen of Sheba. The Hebrew Bible's account is considered legendary. A similar narrative is also found in the Quran (Sheba is distinct from the Sabians). Traditions concerning the legacy of the Queen of Sheba feature extensively in Ethiopian Christianity, particularly Orthodox Tewahedo, and among Yemenis today. She is left unnamed in Jewish tradition, but is known as Makeda in Ethiopian tradition and as Bilqis in Arab and Islamic tradition. According to the Jewish historian Josephus, Sheba was the home of Princess Tharbis, a Cushite who is said to have been the wife of Moses before he married Zipporah. Some Quranic exegetes identified Sheba with the People of Tubba.

== Sources ==
The Sabaic language was written down in the Sabaic script as early as the 11th or 10th centuries BCE. The Sabaic tradition has left behind a sizable epigraphic record. Of the 12,000 corresponding Ancient South Arabian inscriptions, 6,500 are in Sabaic. The region first sees a continuous record of epigraphic documentation in the 8th century BCE, which lasts until the 9th century CE, long after the fall of the Sabaean kingdom and covering a time range of about a millennium and a half and constituting the main source of information about the Sabaeans. South Arabian civilization may be the only civilization that can be reconstructed from epigraphic evidence.

External information about the Sabaeans comes first from Akkadian cuneiform texts starting in the 8th century BCE. Less important are brief reports from the Bible about correspondence between Solomon and the Queen of Sheba. The story is considered legendary as early first-millennium BC epigraphic sources show no evidence of diplomatic missions or women rulers. Knowledge of the Sabaeans as merchant peoples indicates that some level of trade between the regions was underway in this time. After the campaigns of Alexander the Great, South Arabia became a hub of trade routes linking the broader geopolitical realm with India. As such, information about the region begins to appear among Greco-Roman observers and information becomes more concrete. The most important accounts about South Arabia are from Eratosthenes, Strabo, Theophrastus, Pliny the Elder, an anonymous first-century seafarming manual called the Periplus of the Erythraean Sea concerning the politics and topography of South Arabian coasts, the Ecclesiastical History by Philostorgius, and Procopius.

Scholars have noted that Sheba and ancient Judah/Palestine maintained trade, linguistic, and cultural contacts during antiquity.

== History ==
=== Formative period ===
The formative phase of the Sabaeans, or the period prior to the emergence of urban cultures in South Arabia, can be placed the latter part of the 2nd millennium BCE, and was completed by the 10th century BCE, where a fully developed script appears in combination with the technological prowess to construct complex architectural complexes and cities. There is some debate as to the degree to which the movement out of the formative phase was channeled by endogenous processes, or the transfer or technologies from other centers, perhaps via trade and immigration.

Originally, the Sabaeans were part of "communities" (called shaʿbs) on the edge of the Sayhad desert. Very early, at the beginning of the 1st millennium BC, the political leaders of this tribal community managed to create a huge commonwealth of shaʿbs occupying most of South Arabian territory and took on the title "Mukarrib of the Sabaeans".

=== Emergence ===
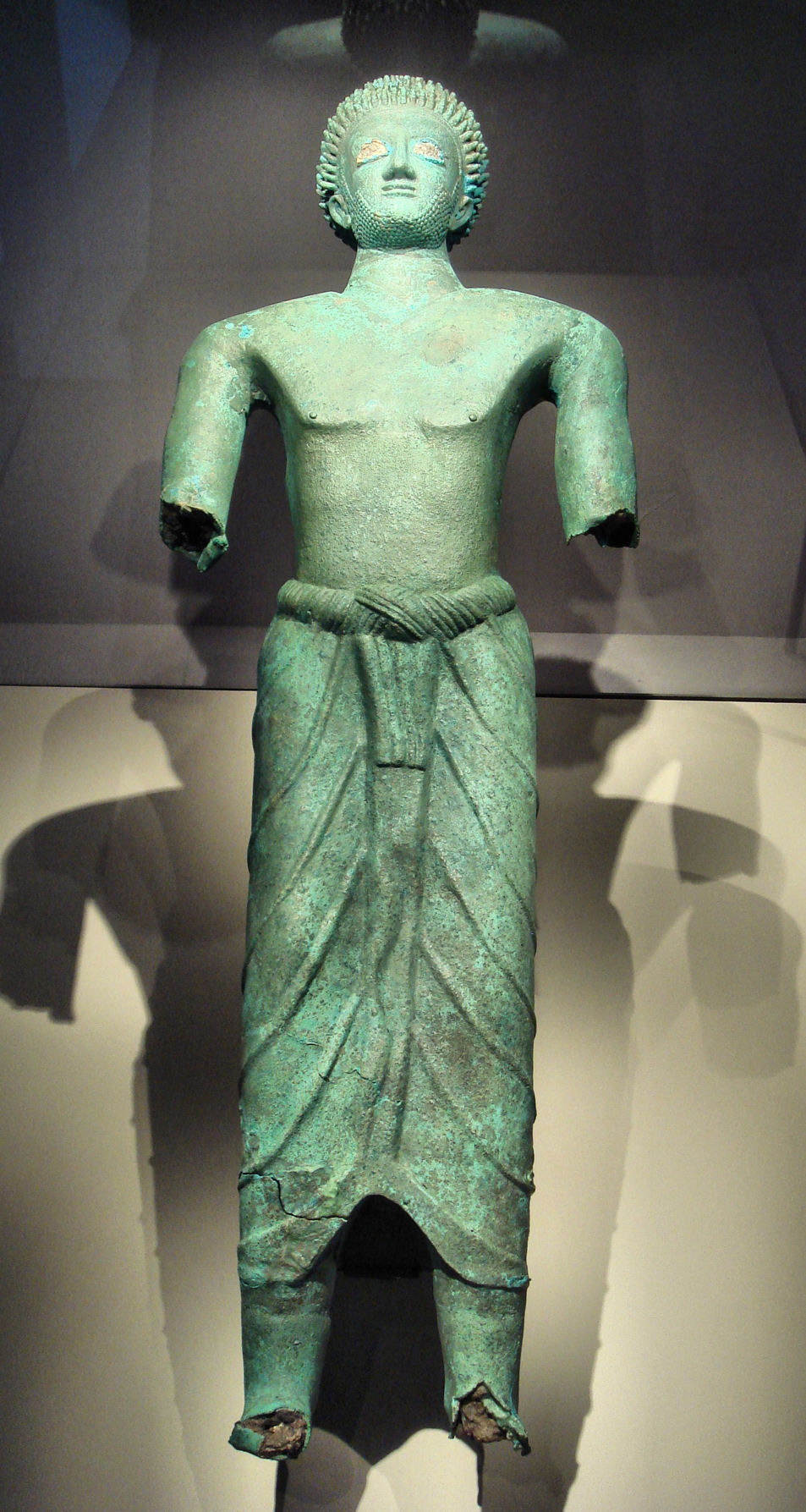
Statue of Hawter 'Atht found in Al-Baydā' (ancient Nashqum, Kingdom of Saba'), 6th–5th century BCE, the Louvre Museum

The origin of the Sabaean Kingdom is uncertain and is a point of disagreement among scholars, with estimates placing it around 1200 BCE, by the 10th century BCE at the latest, or a period of flourishing that only begins from the 8th century BCE onwards. Once the polity had been established, Sabaean kings referred to themselves by the title Mukarrib.

=== First Sabaean kingdom (8th – 1st centuries BCE) ===
==== Era of the mukarribs ====
The first major phase of the Sabaean civilization lasted between the 8th and 1st centuries BCE. For centuries, Saba dominated the political landscape in South Arabia. The 8th century is when the first stone inscriptions appear, and when leaders are already being called by the title Mukarrib ("federator"). Due to this convention, this era can also be called the "Mukarrib period". The title mukarrib was more prestigious than that of mlk ("king") and was used to refer to someone that extended hegemony over other tribes and kingdoms.

Saba reached the height of its powers between the 8th and 6th centuries BCE. In particular, through protracted warfare, Karib'il Watar carried out a series of conquests that extended Sabaean territory to Najran in the north, the Gulf of Aden in the southwest, and eastward from that point along the coast until the western foothills of the Hadhramaut plateau. Saba reigned supreme over South Arabia, and Karib'il established diplomatic contacts with the Assyrian emperor Sennacherib. This territorial range by a South Arabian kingdom would not be seen again until Himyar achieved it over 1,100 years later. Karib'il's success is reflected by the dynastic succession of four rulers from his lineage, including sons, grandson, and great-grandons, a rare occurrence in the face of the rarity of dynastic succession in ancient South Arabian culture. The next time this would be seen was six centuries later in Qataban.

==== Era of the kings ====
After the 6th century BCE, Saba was unable to maintain its supremacy over South Arabia in the face of the expanding adjacent powers of Qataban and Hadhramaut militarily, and Ma'in economically, leading it contract back to its core territory around Marib and Sirwah. Sabaean leaders reverted to use of the title malik ("king") instead of mukarrib. This decline began soon after the end of the reign of Karib'il Watar. While Karib'il established hegemony over the Jawf, his immediate successors only consolidated their power over some of its former city-states (including Nashq and Manhayat) whereas others (like Yathill and the towns of Wadhi Raghwan) were absorbed into Ma'in. Qataban expanded into the Southern Highlands, formerly under Sabaean rule.

Economically, the first Sabaean period was dominated by a caravan economy that had market ties with the rest of the Near East. Its first major trading partners were at Khindanu and the Middle Euphrates. Later, this moved to Gaza during the Persian period, and finally, to Petra in Hellenistic times. The South Arabian deserts gave rise to important aromatics which were exported in trade, especially frankincense and myrrh. It also acted as an intermediary for overland trade with neighbours in Africa and further off from India.

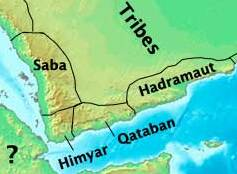
Map of southern Arabia in 100 BCE

By the end of the 1st millennium BCE, several factors came together and brought about the decline of the Sabaean state and civilization. The biggest challenge came from the expansion of the Roman Republic. The Republic conquered Syria in 63 BCE and Egypt in 30 BCE, diverting Saba's overland trade network. The Romans then attempted to conquer Saba around 26/25 BCE with an army sent out under the command of the governor Aelius Gallus, setting Marib to siege. Due to heat exhaustion, the siege had to be quickly given up. However, after conquering Egypt, the overland trade network was redirected to maritime routes, with an intermediary port chosen with Bir Ali (then called Qani). This port was part of the Kingdom of Hadhramaut, far from Sabaean territory. Greatly economically weakened, the Kingdom of Saba was soon annexed by the Himyarite Kingdom, bringing this period to a close.

=== Second Sabaean kingdom (1st – 3rd centuries CE) ===
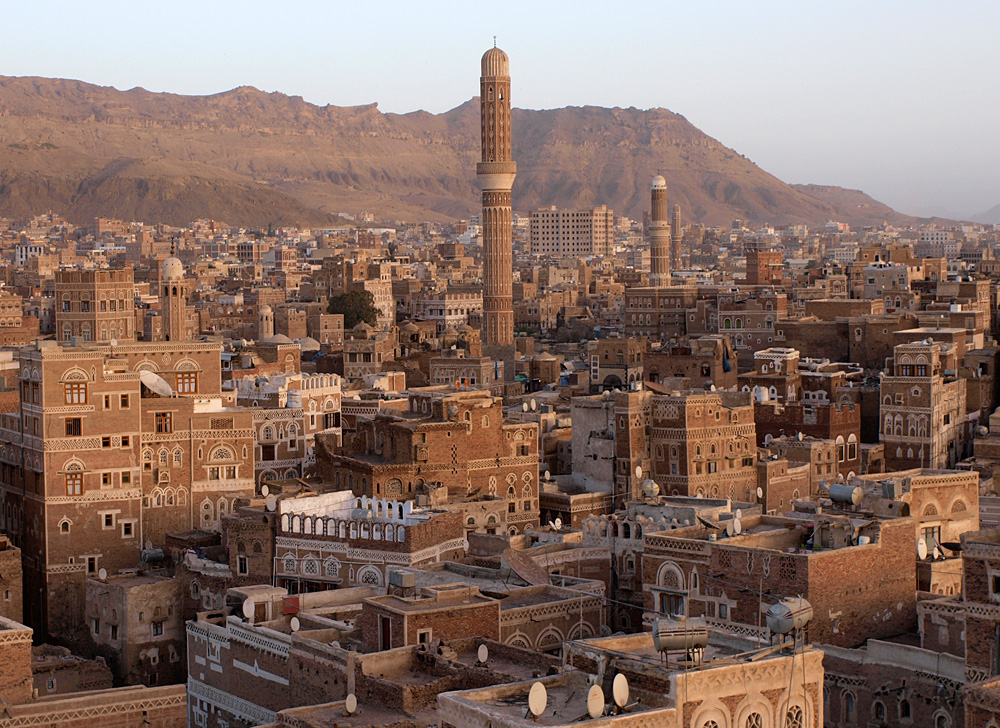
Old Sana'a town with tower buildings

After the disintegration of the first Himyarite Kingdom, the Sabaean Kingdom reappeared and began to vigorously campaign against the Himyarites, and it flourished for another century and a half. This resurgent kingdom was different from the earlier one in many important respects. The most significant change with the earlier Sabaean period is that local power dynamics had shifted from the oasis cities on the desert margin, like Marib, to the highland tribes. The Almaqah temple at Marib returned to being a religious center. Saba inaugurated a new coinage and the remarkable Ghumdan Palace was built at Sanaa which, in this period, had its status elevated to that of a secondary capital next to Marib.

Despite liberating itself from Himyar by around 100 CE, leaders of Himyar continued calling themselves the "king of Saba", as they had been doing during the period in which they ruled the region, to assert their legitimacy over the territory. The Kingdom fell after a long but sporadic civil war between several Yemenite dynasties claiming kingship, and the late Himyarite Kingdom rose as victorious. Sabaean kingdom was finally permanently conquered by the Ḥimyarites around 275 CE. Saba lost its royal status and reverted to a normal tribe, limited to the citizens of Marib, who are named in the last time in South Arabian sources in CIH 541 in requesting assistance from the king in repairing a rupture in the Marib Dam.

== Conquests ==
=== Conquests of Karib'il Watar ===
The major conquests in Saba were driven by the exploits of Karib'il Watar. Karib'il conquered all surrounding neighbours, including the Awsan, Qataban, and Hadhramaut. Karib'il's exploits largely unified Yemen.

Karib'il Watar's campaign against Awsan

The conquests of Karib'il are documented in two lengthy inscriptions (RES 3945–3946) discovered at the Temple of Almaqah at Sirwah. These inscriptions describe a series of eight campaigns to show how Karib'il ultimately brought South Arabia under the control of Saba. The first campaign took place in the highlands west of Marib, where Karib'il declares that he had captured 8,000 and killed 3,000 enemies. The second campaign concerned the Kingdom of Awsan, which flourished in the 8th and 7th centuries BCE. Up until the reign of Karib'il, it was a significant regional competitor with the Kingdom of Saba. However, Karib'il's campaign brought about the obliteration of the Kingdom of Awsan. The tribal elite leading Awsan were slaughtered, and the palace of Murattaʿ was destroyed, as well as their temples and inscriptions. The wadi was depopulated, which is reflected in the abandonment of the wadi. Sabaean inscriptions claim that 16,000 were killed and 40,000 prisoners were taken. This may not have been a significant exaggeration, as the Awsan kingdom disappeared as a political entity from the historical record for five or six centuries. The third and fourth campaigns involve attacks against tribes living in low-lying hills that geographically face the Gulf of Aden. The fifth and sixth campaigns were against Nashshan. Nashshan was, like Awsan, one of Saba's most powerful competitors. However, against Karib'il, combined with the destruction of several towns and buildings and the imposition of a tribute on its people. Any dissidents were killed and the cult of Almaqah was imposed onto Nashshan, with Nashshan's leaders being required to build a temple for him. The final two campaigns were against the Tihamah coastal region and the Najran region.

=== Horn of Africa ===
The role played by Sabaeans in the formation of Dʿmt (Di'amat), a polity located in the Tigray Region of Ethiopia and founded c. 800 BCE, continues to be debated by scholars. Evidence of strong Sabaean influence includes Sabaic inscriptions and Sabaean temples. Scholars of South Arabian archaeology and epigraphy tend to favour a migration and/or colonisation, while scholars of African archaeology tend to stress an indigenous origin. According to the former view, Sabaean populations migrated to the Horn of Africa to establish and/or maintain the new polity, including through managing trade between the two (ivory might have especially been a driver of the expansion). Notably, five temples for Almaqah, the national god of Saba, were built in what is thought to be the domain of the kingdom, including one at its capital, Yeha, which was possibly modelled after another temple at Sirwah; others temples in the Horn of Africa included the Temple of Meqaber Gaʿewa.

Besides religion, Sabaean culture diffused into Di'amat through the use of objects, architectural techniques, artistic styles, institutions, paleographical styles for writings inscriptions, and the use of abstract symbols. Leaders in Di'amat used the classical South Arabian title, the mukarrib, and one particular title that is seen is the "Mukarrib of Diʿamat and Saba" (mkrb Dʿmt s-S^{1}bʾ). Further, inscriptions mention the complete remainder of the known Sabaean deities. The exact timing of the collapse of Di'amat is not known: it happened around the mid-1st millennium BCE and involved a destruction of Yeha along with a number of adjacent sites. This also happened when Saba was beginning to lose its grip on power over South Arabia.

In 2019 Sabaean inscriptions were found in Somaliland and Puntland, as well as a Sabaean temple whose inscriptions say its construction was ordered by the admiral of Sheba's fleet.

In 2025 Alfredo González-Ruibal said "we can perhaps discern two different models: a proper colonialist one along the northern Somali seaboard, with direct intervention of the state and aimed at the extraction of resources, and a diasporic model in the northern Horn [where Dʿmt was located], led by élites who soon mixed with local people, while maintaining ties with their ancestral homeland".

Military warfare continued between Saba, Ethiopia, and Himyar during the second Sabaean period, with a dynamic and shifting array of alliances. Recently discovered evidence shows that these encounters took place, not only on the peninsula, but also on Ethiopian territory during expeditions launched by the Sabaeans.

== Urban centers ==
=== Marib ===
In the Kingdom of Saba, Marib was an oasis and one of the main urban centers of the kingdom. It was by far the largest ancient city from ancient South Arabia, if not its only real city. Marib was located at the precise point that the wadi (of Wadi Dhana) emerges from the Yemeni highlands. It was located along what was called the Sayhad desert by medieval Arab geographers, but is now known as Ramlat al-Sab'atayn. The city lies 135 km east of Sanaa, which is the capital of Yemen today, found in the Wadi Dana delta, in the northwestern central Yemeni highlands. The oasis is about 10,000 hectares and the course of the wadi divides it into two: a northern and a southern half, which was already spoken of in records from the 8th century BCE, and this prominent feature may have been remembered as late as in the time of the Quran (34:15). A wall was built around Marib, and 4 km of that wall is still standing today. The wall, in some places, can be as much as 14 m thick. The wall encloses a 100-hectare area shaped like a trapezoid, and the settlement appears to have been created in the late second millennium BCE. Archaeological inquiries have uncovered a settlement plan that allocated different areas for different tasks. There is one residential division to the city. Another division containing sacred buildings but no residential development was probably a storage area for trade caravans and the shipment of goods. Immediately to the west was the great city temple Harun, dedicated to the national Sabaean god, Almaqah.

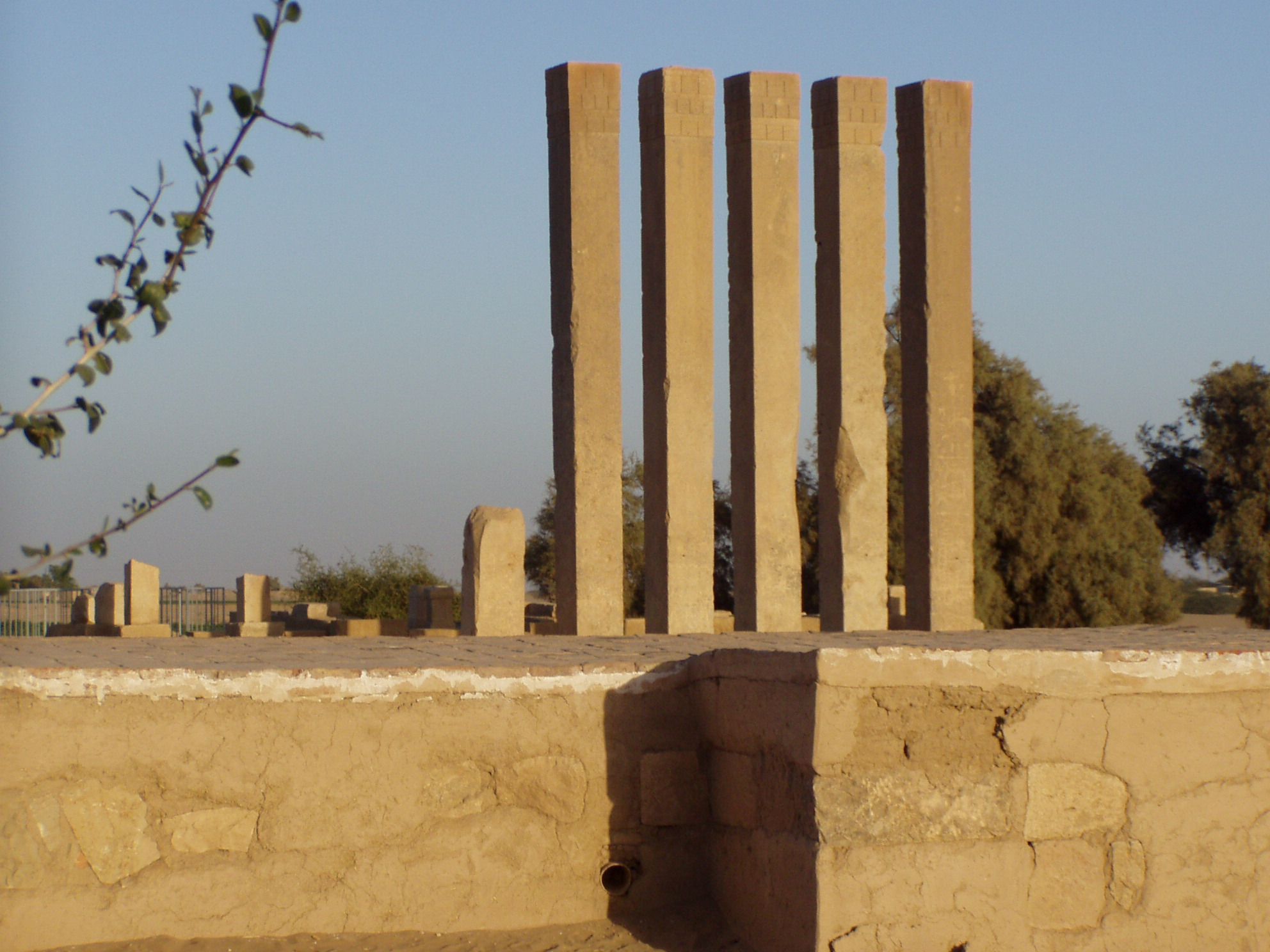
The Barran Temple

A processional road, known from inscriptions but not yet discovered, led from the Harun temple to the Temple of Awwam, 3.5 km to the southeast of Marib, which is both the main temple for the god Almaqah in the Kingdom of Saba and the largest temple complex known from South Arabia. Hundreds of inscriptions are known from the Awwam Temple, and these documents form the basis from which the political history of South Arabia thus far reconstructable from in the first few centuries of the Christian era. The enclosure was built in the 7th century BCE according to a monumental inscription from the time of Yada'il Darih. South of the temple wall is a 1.5-hectare necropolis, in which it is estimated that about 20,000 people have been buried over a time period covering about a millennium.

Shortly west of the Awwam Temple is another major temple in the southern oasis dedicated to Almaqah, which has been fully excavated and is the best studied temple to date from South Arabia: the Barran Temple. It is evident that predecessors to the Barran Temple went back to the 10th century BCE. The construction history is properly documented by inscriptions in the area. The temple was destroyed shortly before the beginning of the Christian eraddea. The exact cause is unknown, but it may have been linked to an (ultimately unsuccessful) siege of South Arabia by the Romans, under the leadership of the governor Aelius Gallus in 25/24 BCE. Inscriptions attest other temples dedicated to other gods but these have not yet been discovered archaeologically.

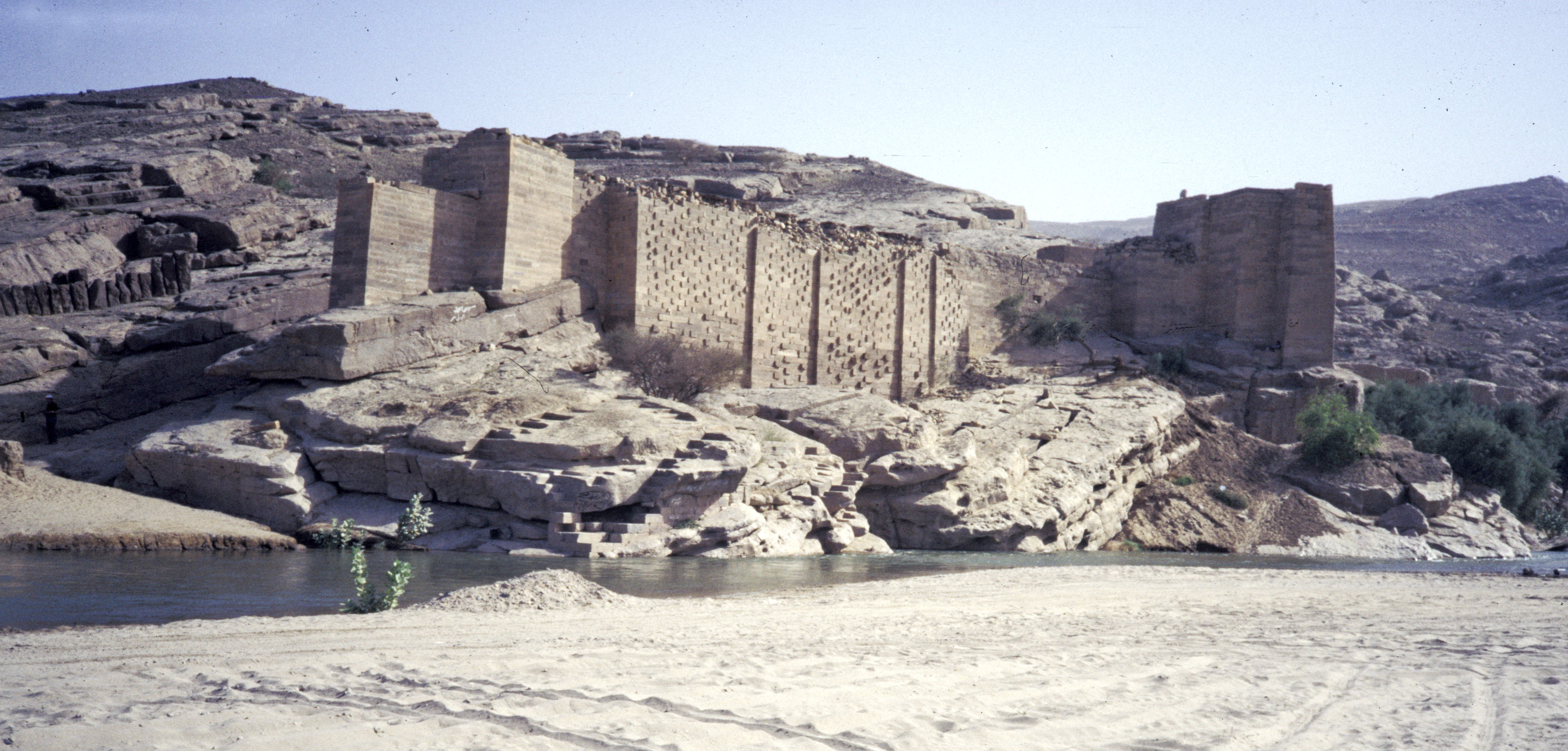
Ruins of the Marib Dam of the former Sabaean capital of Ma'rib, amidst the Sarawat Mountains of present-day Yemen

The Marib Dam was one of the most well-known architectural complexes from Yemen, and was even mentioned in the Quran (34:16), and this construction made it possible to irrigate the 10,000 hectares of the Marib oasis. The dam is located 10 km west of the main settlement. The dam successfully delegates and distributes water from the biannual monsoon rains into two main channels, which move away from the wadi and into fields through a highly dispersive system. This allowed the region to convert alluvial loads into fertile soils and so cultivate various crops. It took until the 6th century BCE for the full closure to be accomplished. The system required constant maintenance, and two major dam failures are reported from 454/455 and 547 CE. However, as political authority weakened over the course of the 6th century CE, maintenance efforts could not be sustained. The dam was therefore breached and the oasis was temporarily abandoned by the early seventh century.

=== Sirwah ===
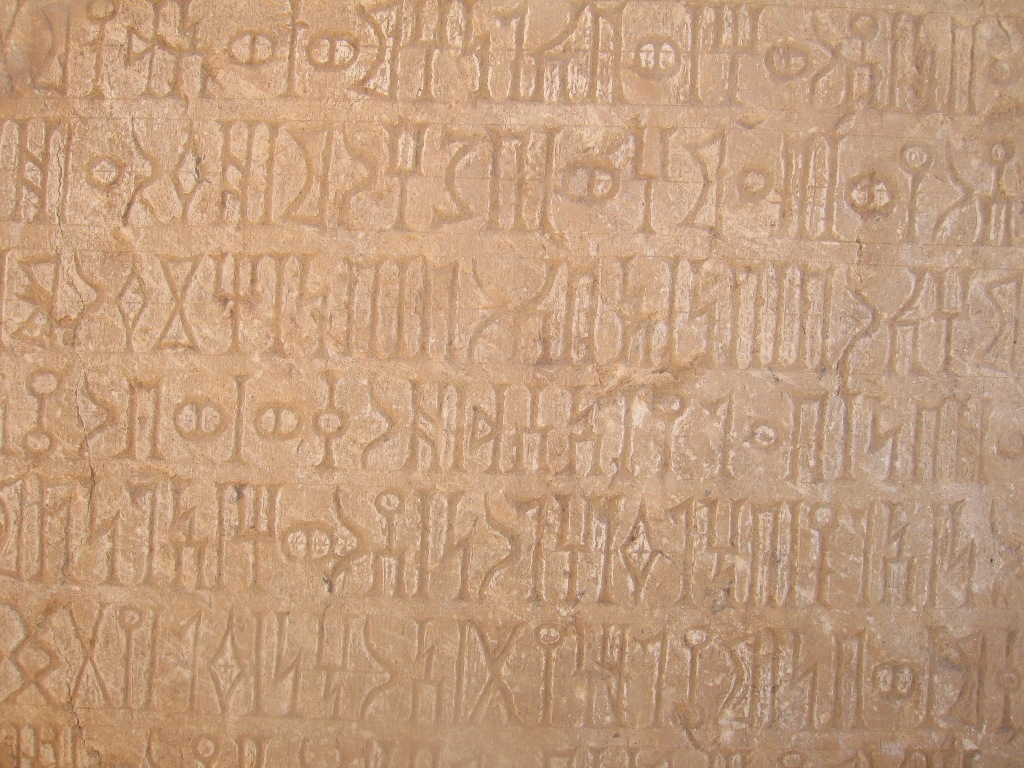
Musnad inscriptions in Sirwah

The second Sabaean urban center was Sirwah. The two cities are connected by an ancient road. A wall had been built around Sirwah by the 10th century BCE. Much smaller than Marib, the city of Sirwah is 3.8 hectares in size, but it is archaeologically well-understood. The main buildings at the site are administrative and sacred buildings. Some buildings demonstrate that Sirwah acted as a transshipment point for trade goods. Legal documents show that Sirwah engaged in trade with Qataban to the southeast and the highlands around Sanaa to the west. Despite the urban area being limited, a significant portion of the space was allocated to sacred buildings. This has led some people to think that Sirwah acted as a religious center. The Great Temple of Almaqah is the most notable one, besides which, four other sacred buildings are known. One of these buildings was probably devoted to the female deity Atarsamain. Yada'il Darih, already a temple builder at the Awwam Temple in Marib, also fundamentally remodelled the Alwaqah Temple in the mid-7th century BCE. Inside the temple, in the area that is most cultically important, stands two parallel monumental inscriptions recording the lifetime achievements of two rulers: Yatha' Amar Watar and Karib'il Watar, who reigned in the late 8th and early 7th centuries BCE. The description in these records begins with comments on sacrifices made to the Sabaean deities, and then mostly delve into military campaigns in meticulous detail. At the end, the inscriptions record purchases of cities, landscapes, and fields.

== Economy ==
The Sabaeans had a long history of seafaring and commerce. A Sabaean presence in Africa was noted in antiquity with the founding of the kingdom of Dʿmt in Ethiopia in the 8th century BCE. The 1st-century CE historian Periplus of the Erythraean Sea described how the Arabs controlled the coast of "Ezana" (the East African coast north of Somalia). The Quran mentions trade with Sheba: "And We placed between them and the cities which We had blessed [many] visible cities. And We determined between them the [distances of] journey, [saying], "Travel between them by night or day in safety." The Old Testament Book of Ezekiel reads, "Dedan traded in saddle blankets with you. Arabia and all the princes of Kedar were your customers; they did business with you in lambs, rams and goats. ‘The merchants of Sheba and Raamah traded with you; for your merchandise they exchanged the finest of all kinds of spices and precious stones, and gold." The Chinese explorer Faxian, who passed through Sri Lanka in 414 CE, reported that Saebaean merchants and Arabs from Oman and Hadhramaut lived in ornate homes in settlements on the island and traded in timber.

== Society ==
=== The gods ===
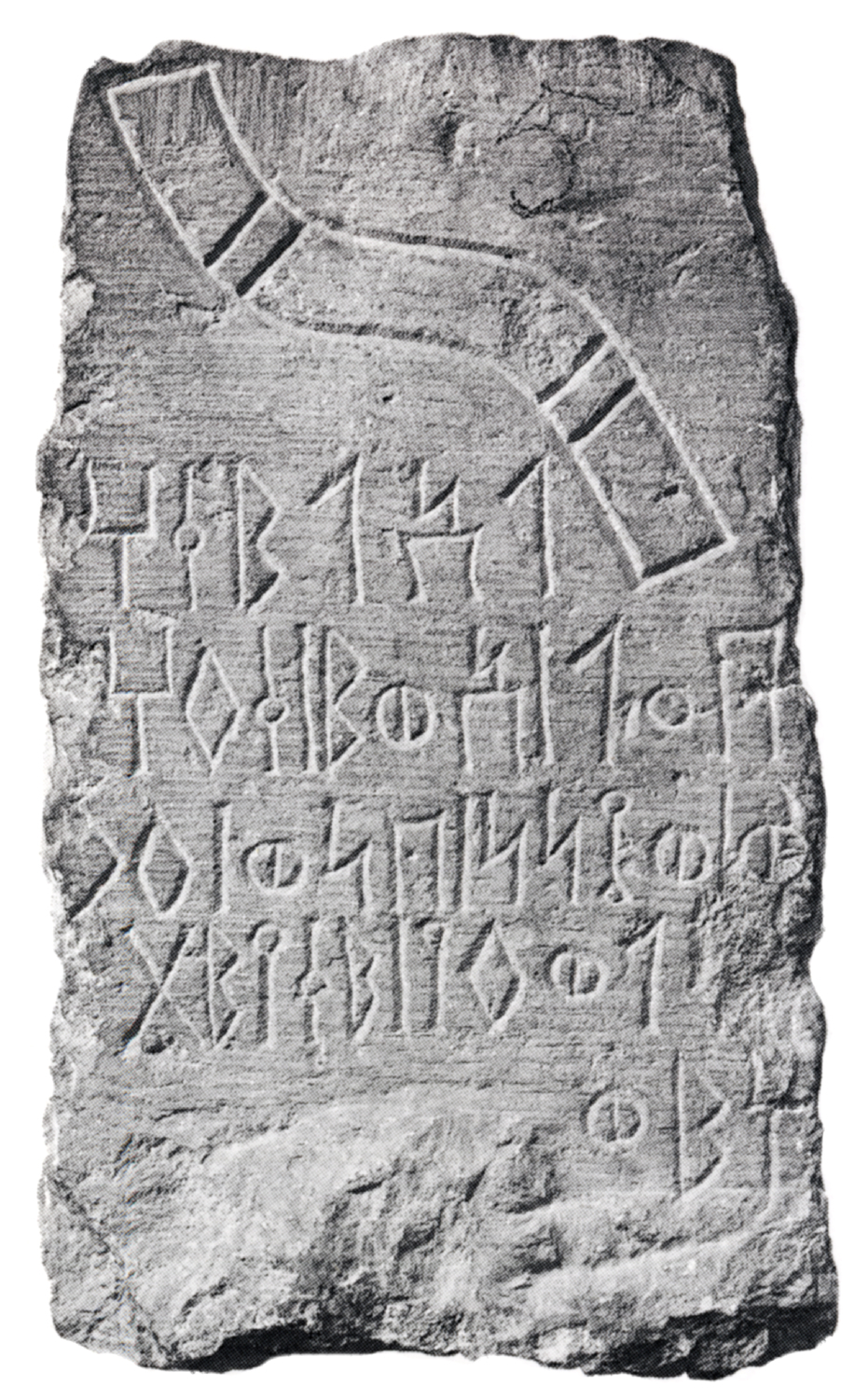
The inscription CIH 393 with the symbol of Almaqah in the top

Limitations in the available evidence prevent a full reconstruction of the full religious world in Ancient South Arabian kingdoms. While many of the known inscriptions speak about gods, most only hand down the name of the divinity without describing its nature, function, or cult. It is not known, for example, if these kingdoms had a god of war or a god of the underworld. Familial relationships between the gods are frequently mentioned, however.

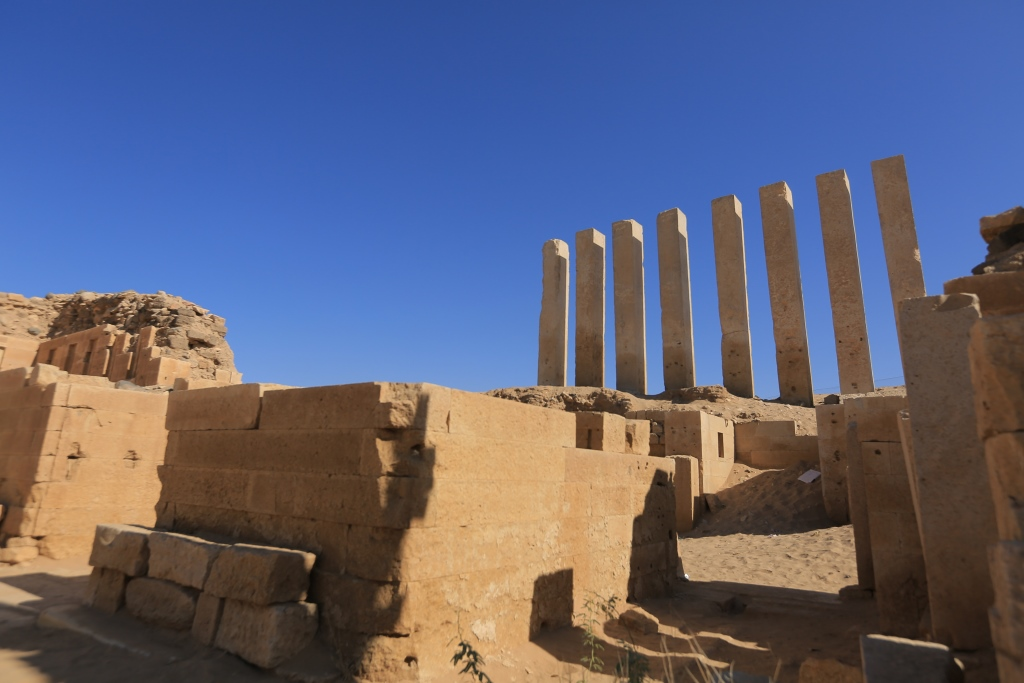
The Temple of Awwam where Almaqah was worshipped

Saba had five gods of its pantheon: Almaqah, Athtar, Haubas, Dhat-Himyam, and Dhat-Badan. The first three are male, and the last two are female. The high god of the pantheon, and the national god of Saba, was Almaqah, whose worship was centered at the Temple of Awwam. Military victory helped spread this cult, such as when a temple to Almaqah was built in Nashshan after being conquered by Saba. The mention of Almaqah in the Jawf also indicates the political role played by Saba in that valley. The nature of the god is not entirely clear, but Almaqah has been hypothesized to be a moon god by some researchers.

Athtar was not limited to Saba, but was instead the common god of the South Arabian pantheon during its polytheistic era. Athtar was also once the great god of the Sabaean pantheon, before being supplanted by Almaqah. Generally however, South Arabian deities are region-specific and lack parallel elsewhere in the Near East.

Anthropomorphic representations of the gods are lacking entirely from the Old Sabaean period, and only begin to appear with the onset of Hellenistic and Roman influences at the turn of the Christian era.

=== The king ===
Ancient South Arabian kings built great public works, had special ties with the gods legitimated through rites only they could perform, and led their armies during battle. They are represented as brave warriors, pious worshippers, and active builders. The fathers of the king is rarely attested independently. The function of the king was distinct from the role of the sheikh. The Geographica by Strabo claims that in the region, the succession of kings was not familial, a claim that is partly confirmed by inscriptions. South Arabian kings did not appeal to their genealogy or the accomplishments of their fathers to legitimate their own rule. Only late in Sabaean history, from the second half of the 2nd century CE, did a real dynastic succession from father to son appear, and it only lasted for two generations.

The Sabaean king was called the mukarrib ("federator") more often than the malik ("king") between the 8th and 6th centuries BCE, to indicate their hegemony over their neighbours. When Saba declined after the 6th centuries BCE and Sabaean territory contracted to what it was prior to the conquests of Karib'il Watar, the title mukarrib is replaced by that of malik.

In the early centuries of Saba, the title of the king was a combination of a name and an epithet. All titles were chosen from a combination of six possible names (Dhamar'ali, Karib'il, Sumhu'alay, Yada"il, Yakrubmalik and Yitha'amar) and four possible epithets (Bayan, Dharih, Watar and Yanu). The repetitiveness of names has caused difficulties for historians trying to determine the relative succession of kings (even when they are attested) and raises questions about what the personal names were of each king. A similar practice took place in the neighbouring Kingdom of Hadhramaut. In the centuries leading up to the Christian era, this changed, kings began identifying with their real name, and reconstructions of Sabaean chronology become simpler.

Accession to the Sabaean throne required the consent of "the Sabaeans, the qayls and the army" in one inscription. The legislative body extended beyond the king, including other functionaries. The Sabaean monarchs did not implement taxes but derived their wealth from royal lands, war boody, and rent from clients. Military service could be compelled and financial requests could be made for the purpose of funding construction work. Any tithes on temple lands went to the temples themselves, not the monarch.

The king of Saba was not deified. The only known case of deification from ancient South Arabian cultures is from the Kingdom of Awsan during its resurgent phase.

=== The tribe ===
In the South Arabian tribal system, a fictitious shared ancestor was created and members of the tribe are referred to as the sons of the national god (in the case of Saba, they are "sons of Almaqah"). Allied states and tribes are called "brothers". Tribes were divided into lineages and sub-lineages, reflected by the names of members. The individual proper name appears along with the patronymic, the lineage name, and the name of the tribe, with the exception of funerary inscriptions, where the individual name is attested alone. In areas closer to the desert, the family name was more privileged and commonly mentioned, with the tribal name becoming less mentioned. Personal identity only went back to the name of the father, unlike in North Arabia in the same time period or the later Islamic period where a long sequence of ancestors is used to identify a figure. Identity was also in reference to the kingdom that one belonged to (Sabaeans, Qatabanians), not to a broader geographical construct (like "South Arabian").

== Culture ==
=== Language ===
Sabaic was the spoken language of the Kingdom of Saba. Geographically, Sabaic was spoken in Saba, just as Qatabanic was spoken in Qataban and Hadraumitic was spoken in Hadhramaut. The only exception to this is Minaic, which is attested well-beyond the geographical territory of its corresponding kingdom, Ma'in. These four languages share and are distinguished by a number of linguistic features. The documentation for Sabaic is the best of any language of Ancient South Arabian, attested in all phases of the history of Saba.

=== Writing schools ===
The South Arabian kingdoms had writing schools with a common cultural background, although each school also had distinct practices.

== Legacy ==
=== Bible ===
Saba appears in the Hebrew Bible, also the first place that the Sabaeans are mentioned by an external source. Most famously, Saba is presented as, through its female monarch the Queen of Sheba, engaging in trade with Solomon in goods of aromatics and gold. Historians have subjected this story to questions concerning its historicity. The Hebrew Bible links the Sabaean caravan trading network with other cities including Dedan, Tayma, and Ra'mah.

=== Islamic tradition ===
The story of the visit of the Queen of Sheba to Solomon is discussed in Quran 27:15–44.

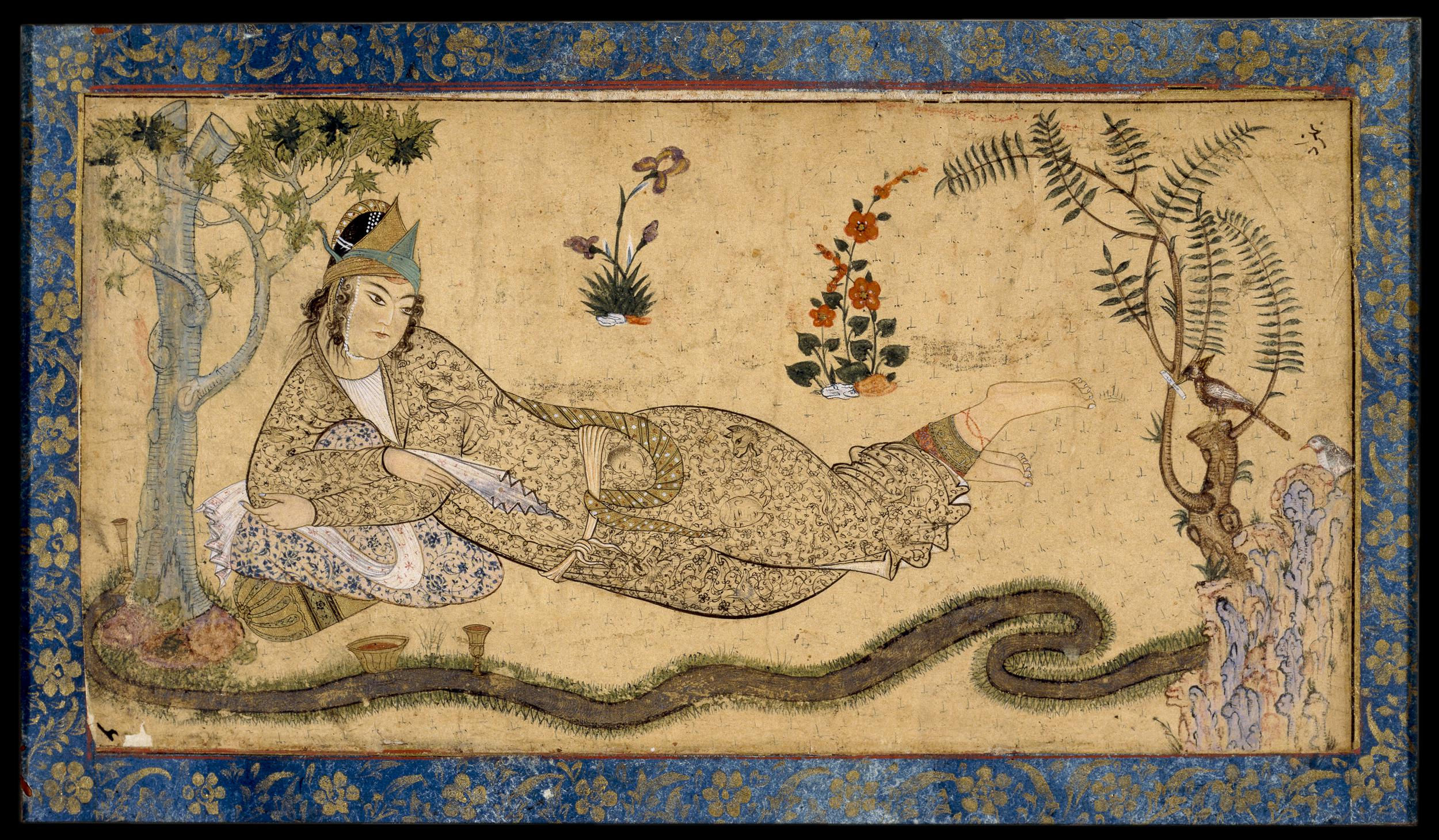
Bilqis reclining in a garden, Persian miniature (ca. 1595), tinted drawing on paper

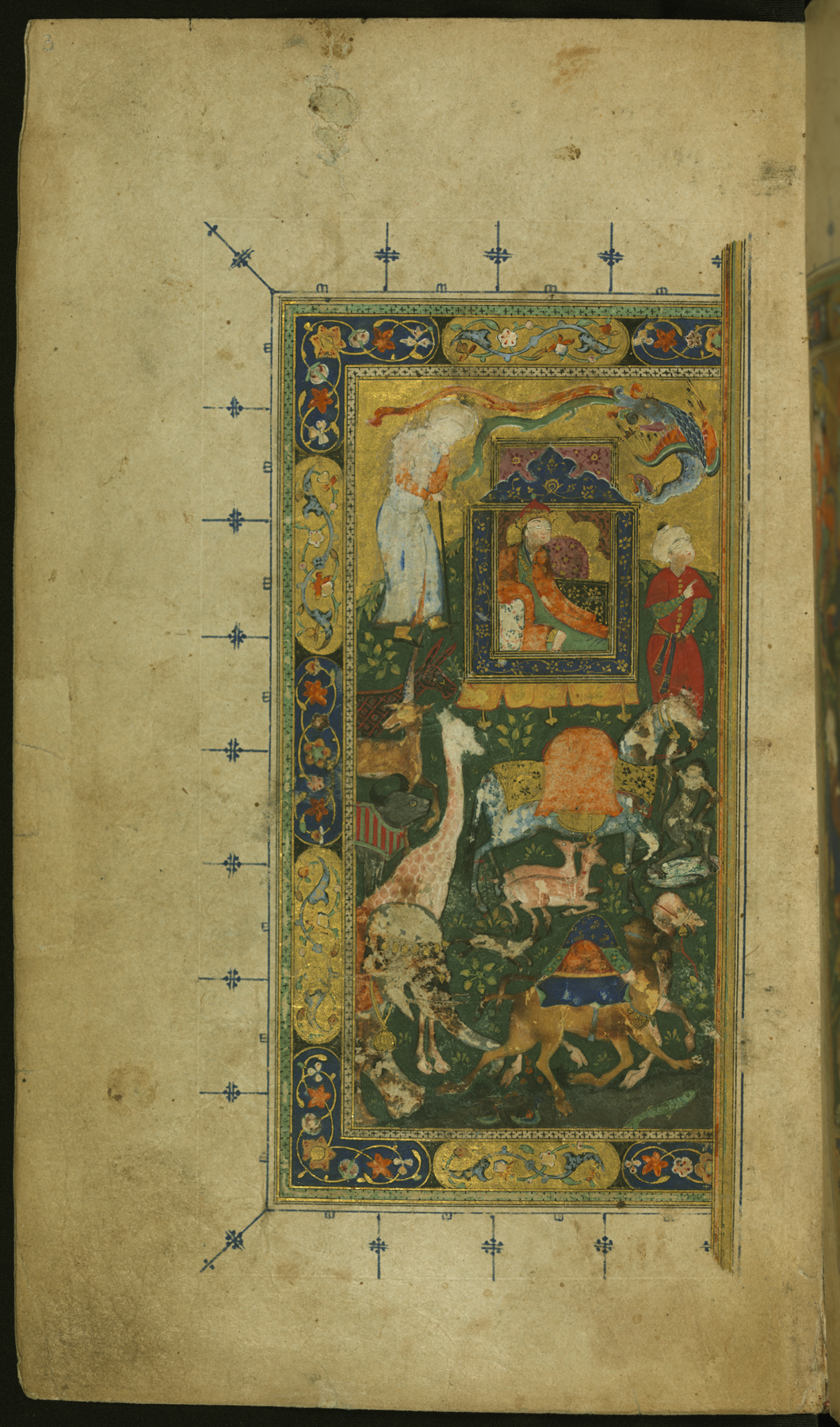
Illustration in a Hafez frontispiece: Bilqis enthroned, under a flying simurgh (c. 1539)

The name of Saba' is mentioned in the Qur'an in Surah 5:69, Surah 27:15-44 and Surah 34:15-17. Surah 34 is named Sabaʾ. Their mention in Surah 5 refers to the area in the context of Solomon and the Queen of Sheba, whereas their mention in Surah 34 refers to the Flood of the Dam, in which the dam was ruined by flooding. There is also an epithet, Qawm Tubbaʿ or "People of Tubbaʿ" (Surah 44:37, Surah 50:12-14) that some exegetes have identified as a reference to the kings of Saba'.

Muslim commentators such as al-Tabari, al-Zamakhshari, al-Baydawi supplement the story at various points. The Queen's name is given as Bilqis, probably derived from Greek παλλακίς or the Hebraised pilegesh, "concubine". According to some he then married the Queen, while other traditions assert that he gave her in marriage to a tubba of Hamdan. According to the Islamic tradition as represented by al-Hamdani, the queen of Sheba was the daughter of Ilsharah Yahdib, the Himyarite king of Najran.

Although the Quran and its commentators have preserved the earliest literary reflection of the complete Bilqis legend, there is little doubt among scholars that the narrative is derived from a Jewish Midrash.

Bible stories of the Queen of Sheba and the ships of Ophir served as a basis for legends about the Israelites traveling in the Queen of Sheba's entourage when she returned to her country to bring up her child by Solomon. There is a Muslim tradition that the first Jews arrived in Yemen at the time of King Solomon, following the politico-economic alliance between him and the Queen of Sheba.

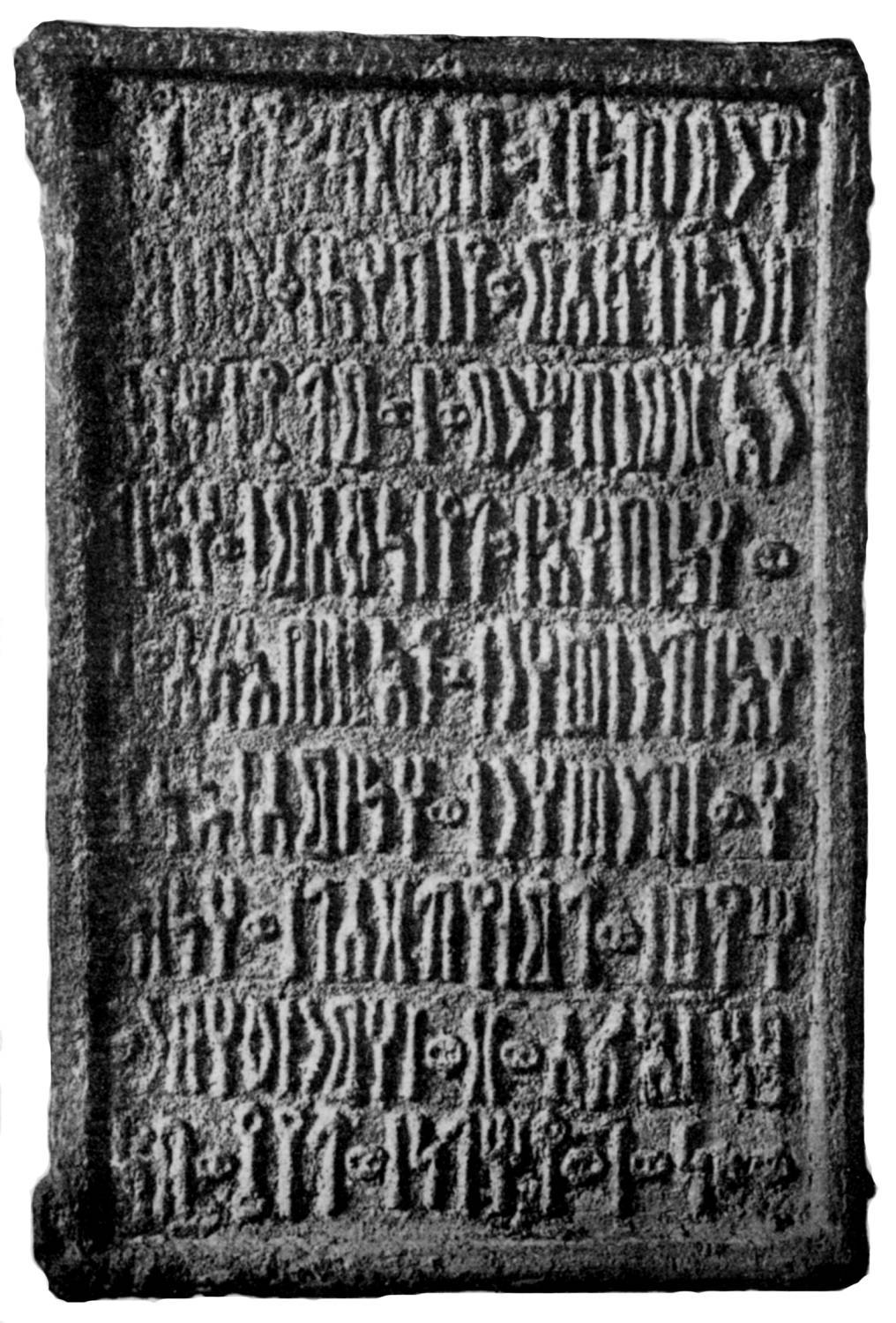
Inscription that shows religious practice during pilgrimage

The Ottoman scholar Mahmud al-Alusi compared the religious practices of South Arabia to Islam in his Bulugh al-'Arab fi Ahwal al-'Arab.

The Arabs during the pre-Islamic period used to practice certain things that were included in the Islamic Sharia. They, for example, did not marry both a mother and her daughter. They considered marrying two sisters simultaneously to be the most heinous crime. They also censured anyone who married his stepmother, and called him dhaizan. They made the major hajj and the minor umra pilgrimage to the Ka'ba, performed the circumambulation around the Ka'ba tawaf, ran seven times between Mounts Safa and Marwa sa'y, threw rocks and washed themselves after sexual intercourse. They also gargled, sniffed water up into their noses, clipped their fingernails, removed all pubic hair and performed ritual circumcision. Likewise, they cut off the right hand of a thief and stoned Adulterers.

According to the medieval religious scholar al-Shahrastani, Sabaeans accepted both the sensible and intelligible world. They did not follow religious laws but centered their worship on spiritual entities.

=== Ethiopian and Yemenite tradition ===
In the medieval Ethiopian cultural work called the Kebra Nagast, Sheba was located in Ethiopia. Some scholars therefore point to a region in the northern Tigray and Eritrea which was once called Saba (later called Meroe), as a possible link with the biblical Sheba. Donald N. Levine links Sheba with Shewa (the province where modern Addis Ababa is located) in Ethiopia.

Traditional Yemenite genealogies also mention Saba, son of Qahtan; Early Islamic historians identified Qahtan with the Yoqtan (Joktan) son of Eber (Hūd) in the Hebrew Bible (Gen. 10:25-29). James A. Montgomery finds it difficult to believe that Qahtan was the biblical Joktan based on etymology.

== See also ==
- Ancient South Arabian art
- Landmarks of the Ancient Kingdom of Saba, Marib
- List of rulers of Saba and Himyar
- Azd
- Banu Hamdan
- Haubas
- Minaean Kingdom
- Old South Arabian, a group of languages
- Qataban
- Rada'a

== Sources ==
- Arbach, Mounir; Schiettecatte, Jérémie; Al-Ḥajj, Muḥammad (2021), The kingdom of Sabaʾ in the second century CE — A reassessment, Presses Universitaires du Midi, p. 69
- Arbach, Mounir; Rossi, Irene (2022). The city-states of the Jawf at the dawn of Ancient South Arabian history (8th–6th centuries BCE). L'Erma Di Bretschneider.
- Avanzini, Alessandra (2016). By land and by sea: a history of South Arabia before Islam recounted from inscriptions. L'Erma Di Bretschneider.
- Hoyland, Robert (2002). Arabia and the Arabs: From the Bronze Age to the Coming of Islam. Routledge.
- Korotayev, Andrey (1995). Ancient Yemen. Oxford: Oxford University Press. ISBN 0-19-922237-1. Archived from the original on 2023-11-29.
- Korotayev, Andrey (1996). Pre-Islamic Yemen. Wiesbaden: Harrassowitz Verlag. ISBN 3-447-03679-6.
- Magee, Peter (2014). The Archaeology of Prehistoric Arabia: Adaptation and Social Formation from the Neolithic to the Iron Age. Cambridge University Press.
- Maraqten, Mohammed (2024). "Historiography of Pre-Islamic Arabia: Arab Scholars and Their Contributions to the Writing of the History of Ancient Yemen". In Baadj, Amar (ed.). A Handbook of Modern Arabic Historical Scholarship on the Ancient and Medieval Periods. Brill. pp. 100–137. doi:10.1163/9789004460089_004. ISBN 978-90-04-46008-9.
- Nebes, Norbert (2023). "Early Saba and Its Neighbors". In Radner, Karen; Moeller, Nadine; Potts, D. T. (eds.). The Oxford History of the Ancient Near East: The Age of Persia. Vol. 5. Oxford University Press. pp. 299–375. ISBN 978-0-19-068766-3.
- Potts, Justine (2025). "An Unpublished Inscription From the ʾAwām Sanctuary of ʾAlmaqah: New Evidence for a Royal mqtwy and Sabaean Campaigns in the 'Land of the Abyssinians'". Arabian Archaeology and Epigraphy. 36: 277–298. doi:10.1111/aae.12262.
- Robin, Christian Julien (2002). "Saba' and the Sabaeans". In Simpson, John (ed.). Queen of Sheba, Treasures from Ancient Yemen. The British Museum Press. pp. 51–58.
- Robin, Christian Julien (2015). "Before Ḥimyar: Epigraphic Evidence for the Kingdoms of South Arabia". In Fisher, Greg (ed.). Arabs and Empires Before Islam. Oxford University Press. pp. 90–126.
- Robin, Christian Julien (2020). "Allah avant Muhammad". Jerusalem Studies in Arabic and Islam: 1–145.
- Schiettecatte, Jérémie (2024). "Sabaʾ". Thematic Dictionary of Ancient Arabia.
- Schulz, Regine (2024). "South Arabia and Its Relations with Ethiopia: A Reciprocal History". In Sciacca, Christine (ed.). Ethiopia at the Crossroads. Yale University Press. pp. 127–133. ISBN 978-0-300-27279-6.
- Stein, Peter (2020). "Ancient South Arabian". In Hasselbach-Andee, Rebecca (ed.). A Companion to Ancient Near Eastern Languages. Wiley. pp. 337–353.
- Stein, Peter (2024). "Südarabien (Jemen). Das "Glückliche Arabien"". In Kaplony, Andreas (ed.). Geschichte der arabischen Welt (in German). C.H.Beck. pp. 3–10. ISBN 978-3-406-82246-9.
