= Awsan =

Ancient South Arabian kingdom

Kingdom of Awsan Qatabanian: 𐩱𐩥𐩯𐩬; Arabic: أوسان
- 8th century BC–7th century BC
- Core territory; Peripheral territory; Wadis; ● Hajar Yahirr; ○ Niṣāb
- Capital: Ḥajar Yaḥirr
- Common languages: Old South Arabian
- Religion: Arabian paganism
- History
  - Established: 8th century BC
  - Disestablished: 7th century BC
Succeeded by
Qataban; Saba'
- Today part of: Yemen

The Kingdom of Awsan, commonly known simply as Awsan (Qatabanian: 𐩱𐩥𐩯𐩬, romanized: ʾwsn; Arabic: أوسان, romanized: ʾAwsān), was a kingdom in Ancient South Arabia, centered around a wadi called the Wadi Markha. The wadi remains archaeologically unexplored. The name of the capital of Awsan is unknown, but it is assumed to be the tell that is today known as Hagar Yahirr (locally named Ḥajar Asfal), the largest settlement in the wadi. Hagar Yahirr was 15 hectares and surrounded by an irrigated area of nearly 7,000 hectares, indicating that it was a formidable power in its time. The main god of Awsan was called Balu (blw).

The Kingdom of Awsan experienced two main periods of activity. The first began in the 8th century BC, and in this time, Awsan was militarily allied with the Kingdom of Saba and, together, launched campaigns against common enemies. In the late 7th century BC, this alliance changed into a rivalry and Saba, under Karib'il Watar, obliterated Awsan, then ruled by a king named Murattaʿ. The later kingdom of Awsan experienced a resurgence around or after the 2nd century BC, its independence waning and waxing against Qatabanic control of the area.

== History ==
=== 8th century BC ===
In the 8th century BC, Awsan was allied to the Kingdom of Saba. Documents have been found dedicated to the gods and commemorating the brotherhood between the states. Together, Saba and Awsan undertook a successful military ventures against Qataban during the reign of the Sabaean king, Yatha' Amar Watar. The venture was successful, and Saba imposed itself on Qataban as a result. Another continuity between the kingdoms was the use of the title mukarrib to designate their leader, and it is not known which one borrowed it from the other. There is also evidence that Awsan also had contacts with the Jawf valley in the 8th century BC.

=== Destruction ===
In the late 7th century BC, the alliance with Saba had become a rivalry. During the reign of the Sabaean leader Karib'il Watar, the Kingdom of Awsan was destroyed by Saba and its allies (cities from the Jawf including Nashshan and Haram). Karba'il's victory is recorded in a lengthy inscription known as RES 3945, which records eight campaigns undertaken during his reign, the second of which concerned Awsan. The tribal elite leading Awsan were slaughtered, and the palace of Murattaʿ was destroyed, as well as their temples and inscriptions. The wadi was depopulated, which is reflected in the abandonment of the wadi. Sabaean inscriptions claim that 16,000 were killed and 40,000 prisoners were taken. This may not have been a significant exaggeration, as the Awsan kingdom disappeared as a political entity from the historical record for five or six centuries.

The summary of the second campaign in the inscription reads:

When he crushed Awsān, killed sixteen thousand [16000] of them, captured forty thousand [40000]; devastated *Wusr from Lagiʾatum to Ḥammān; burnt all the cities of *Anfum; put to the torch all the cities of Ḥabbān and of *Dhayb; 5 devastated their irrigated zones; laid waste to Ns¹m, the irrigated area of Rs²ʾy, and Girdān; crushed {Awsān} in Datīnat and burnt all its cities; obliterated *Tafīḍ, destroyed it, put it to the torch, and laid waste to its irrigated areas; overwhelmed {Awsān} until reaching the coast, burnt all of its ci[ties] which lie by the coast; crushed {Awsān} in *Wusr, until routing Awsān and *Murattiʿ um its king, inflicting as punishment {the delivery} of the council chiefs of Awsān to S¹mht and inflicting as punishment 6 massacre and captivity; brought back the looting of his palace Miswar and removed all the inscriptions which [Karib]ʾīl seized {‘inflicted as punishment’} in his palace Miswar and the inscriptions of his deities’ temples; ...[18 letters] ... his palace Miswar; has caused to enter among the offspring of *Almaqah and his allies—his freemen and his serfs—{people} of the various territories of Awsān and of its cities, assigned to *Almaqah and to Sabaʾ S¹rm and its provinces, and Ḥmdn and its provinces, provided with an enclosure the 7 cities of S¹rm, had their irrigated areas cultivated and established Sabaʾ there.

There is also evidence that Saba, after defeating Awsan, divided the territory between two of its other allies at the time: Qataban and Hadhramaut. There is evidence that Awsan retained its individuality in these later centuries, at least in the area under Qatabanian control.

=== Brief resurgence ===
When the ability of Qataban to project control over the Wadi Markha declined, the Kingdom of Awsan experienced a resurgence and regained its autonomy for at least a few decades. The timing of this event is unclear. Christian J. Robin proposes a timing in the 2nd century BC, with Jeremie Schiettecatte putting it in the 1st century BC. An extension of this phase into the first centuries AD cannot be ruled out: a 2nd century AD inscription from Saba mentions a war declared against Awsan, but not all are convinced that this data requires the existence of an Awsanite kingdom at the time. This is also the only place and time in the history of ancient South Arabian culture where the king was deified: the only known South Arabian king deified after their death was the Awsanite king Yaṣdaqʾil Farʿam Šarḥiʿat. Some kings from this era are known. Their statues show an iconographic evolution. The earliest kings are shown wearing typical South Arabian clothing, but the last one known is depicted as a Roman citizen, with curly hair and wearing a toga.

== Capital ==
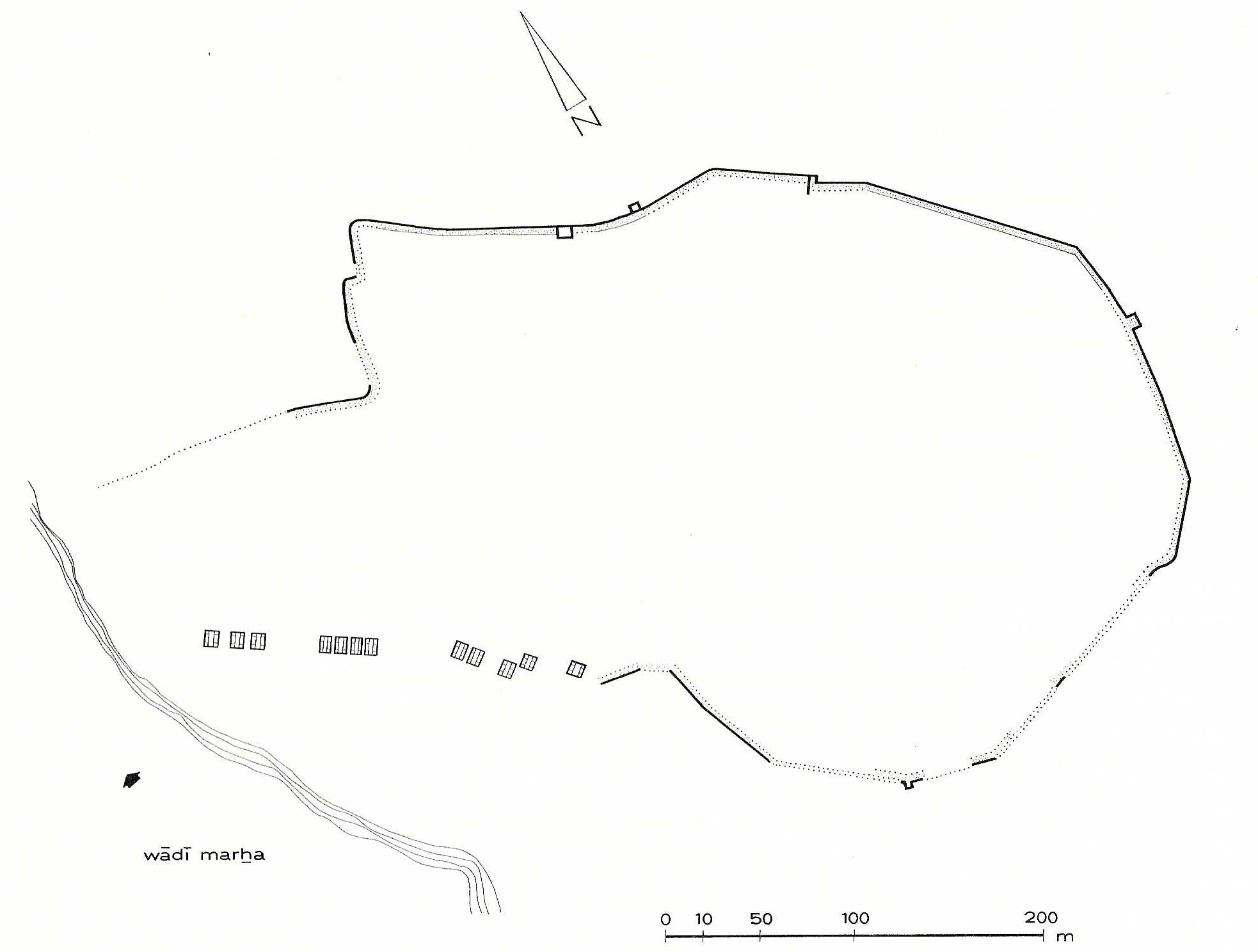
Plan of Hajar Yahirr.

Hajar Yahirr, sitting on 15 ha of land and surrounded by a wall 1500–1700 m in length, is the site of one of the largest cities of Ancient South Arabia. It is situated at the right bank of the mouth of Wadi Markhah, in modern Shabwah Governorate of the Republic of Yemen. Its position between the twin peaks of Jabal Yahirr and Jabal Burqa sheltering it from strong winds. Its city wall, built of stone, had multiple city gates and bastions, and a "Temenos" section in the south was separated from the rest of the city by another wall. Inside the "Temenos" area, multiple large buildings were identified including one that is 60×40 meters in size which contains multiple rooms, doorways and courtyards and is posited to be a palace or temple. It also shows signs of severe burning.

The settlement was surrounded by an extensive irrigation system, roughly 6800 ha in area. The watering system was fed by two main canals, each up to 100 m wide, one on each side of the wadi. The northern canal fed an area of 2400 ha, while the southern canal fed an area of 4400 ha, possibly an underestimation.

The claim of destruction by fire of Karib'il Watar seems to be supported by evidence. The city, as previously mentioned, shows signs of destruction by fire, and the irrigation system surrounding it was abandoned during the same period.

The siting of Ḥajar Yaḥirr is consistent with other capitals of petty kingdoms, at the mouths of large wādīs: Ma`īn in the Wādī al-Jawf, Ma'rib in Wādī Dana, Timna in Wādī Bayhān, and Shabwah in Wādī 'Irmah.

== Religion ==
The main god of Awsan was called Balu (blw).

One oracular temple called Nuʿmān is known from Awsan. It was in operation in the 1st century AD, with the oracular god being Wadd.

== Bibliography ==
- Agostini, Alessio (2023). "The masʾal oracle: a survey of an ancient South Arabian divinatory practice". Semitica et Classica. 16: 139–155. doi:10.1484/J.SEC.5.137274.
- Avanzini, Alessandra (2016). By land and by sea: a history of South Arabia before Islam recounted from inscriptions. L'Erma Di Bretschneider.
- Nebes, Norbert (2023). "Early Saba and its Neighbors". In Radner, Karen; Moeller, Nadine; Potts, Daniel (eds.). The Oxford History of the Ancient Near East: Volume V: the Age of Persia. Oxford University Press. pp. 299–375. ISBN 978-0-19-068766-3.
- Robin, Christian Julien (2012). "Matériaux pour une typologie des divinités arabiques et de leurs representations". In Sachet, Isabelle (ed.). Dieux et déesses d'Arabie : images et représentations : actes de la table ronde tenue au Collège de France (Paris) les 1er et 2 octobre 2007. De Boccard. pp. 7–118.
- Robin, Christian Julien (2015). "Before Ḥimyar: Epigraphic Evidence for the Kingdoms of South Arabia". In Fisher, Greg (ed.). Arabs and Empires Before Islam. Oxford University Press. pp. 90–126.
- Schiettecatte, Jérémie (2006). Villes et urbanisation de l'Arabie du Sud à l'époque préislamique : formation, fonctions et territorialités urbaines dans la dynamique de peuplement régionale [Cities and Urbanisation in South Arabia in Pre-Islamic Times: Formation, Functions and Urban Territories within the Context of Regional Settlement Patterns.] (in French). Paris: Université Panthéon-Sorbonne. pp. 238–244.
- Becker, Helmut; Fassbinder, Jörg W. E.; Brunner, Ueli (2001). The Discovery of the Royal Capital of Awsan at Hagar Yahirr, Wadi Markha, Yemen by Satellite Images, Aerial Photography, Field Walking and Magnetic Prospecting; Monuments and Sites, vol. 6. Edition Lipp. pp. 127–134. ISBN 978-3874906753.
- Brunner, Ueli (1997). Proceedings of the Seminar for Arabian Studies, 1997, Vol. 27, The history of irrigation in the Wādi Marẖah. Archaeopress. pp. 75–85.
