= Nashshan =

Ancient city in Yemen

Nashan
- Nashshān
- Location within Yemen
- 16°10′N 44°45′E
- Location: Yemen
- Region: Al Jawf Governorate

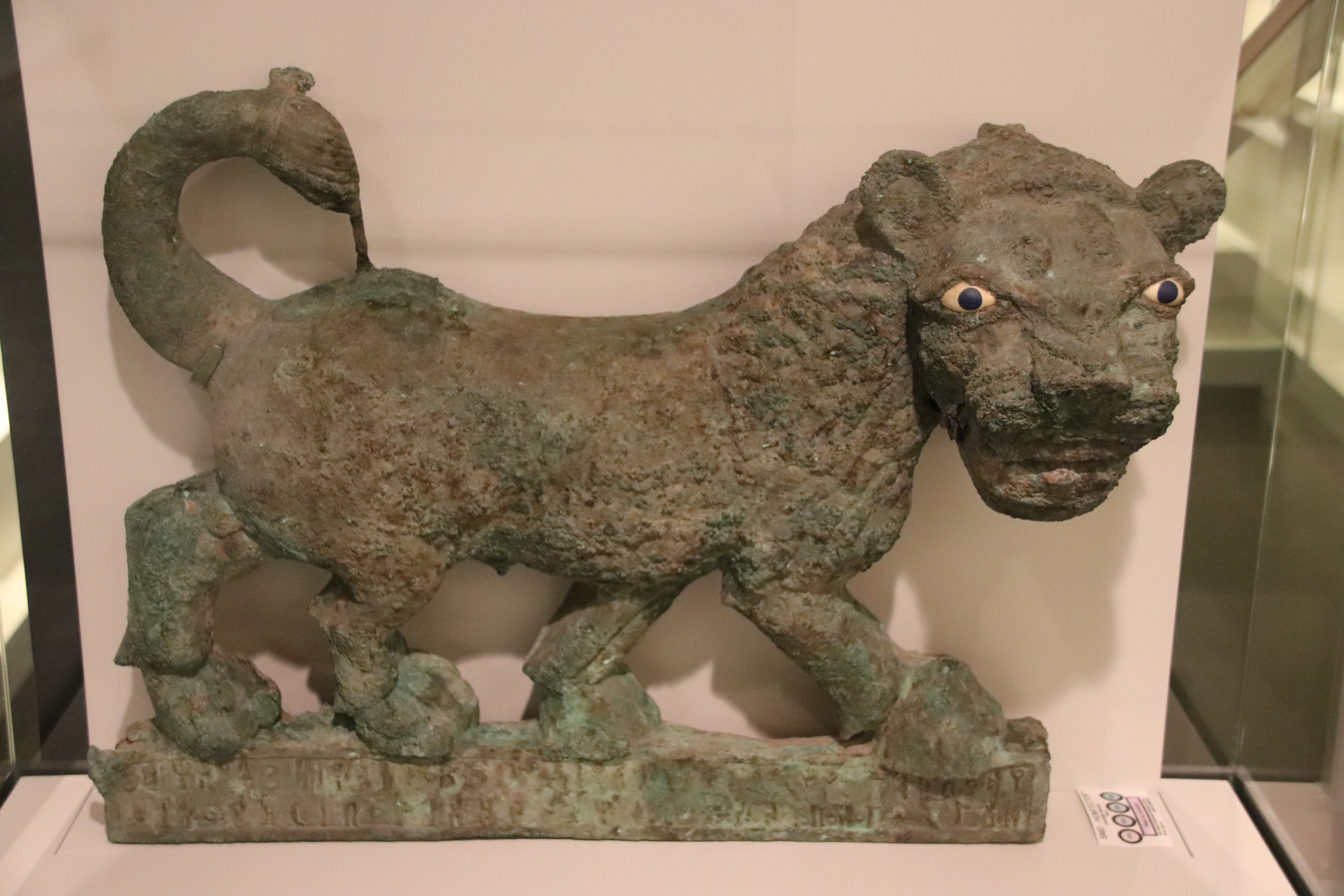
Bronze Guardian Lion of Nashshan, Yemen, c. 6th Century BC

Nashshan (Minaean: 𐩬𐩦𐩬 romanized: nšn, Našān; modern day Kharbat Al-Sawda', Arabic: خربة السوداء, romanized: Ḵirba al-Sawdāʾ) is the name of an ancient South Arabian city in the northern al-Jawf region of present day Yemen, originally independent but later subsumed into the territory of the ancient Kingdom of Ma'in between the 6th and 4th centuries BC. Like many other city-states of the Jawf, Nashshan functioned as the name of both the city and the tribe.

The city was called Nestum in the Natural History book that was written by Pliny the Elder.

The main god of Nashshan was called Aranyadaʿ.

== History ==
=== 8th century BC ===
Nashshan is considered the most important city of the Jawf valley. Originally autonomous and independent from its neighbours, it was allied with the Kingdom of Saba in the 8th century BC, as attested by documents from the time of the Sabaean king Yatha' Amar Watar and his royal Nashshanite contemporary, Malikwaqah. Together, the two states fought and subjugated common enemies, like the city-state of Kamna and the Kingdom of Awsan. A stela of Yatha' Amar Watar called AO 31929, from around this time, speaks of a pact of alliance between Saba and Nashshan:

Yatha amar Watar son of Yakrubmalik mukarrib of Saba dedicated to Aranyada' the patron when Aranyada came back from the territories of Aranyada' and of Nashshan and avenged Nashshan at the expense of Kaminahu because Nashshan had maintained the alliance of Almaqah and of Aranyada', of Yatha amar and of Malikwaqah, of Saba of Nashshan, because of ... of god and parton of pact and alliance.

=== Conflict with the Kingdom of Saba ===
Over the subsequent decades, relations began to complicate between Nashshan and Saba. This may have been caused by the growing power of Nashshan, and its rising influence over the Jawf, since the relevant deed reports do not mention any infractions of loyalty or other hostilities. In this process, documents from Saba begin to portray Nashshan as among the worst enemies of Saba. In the 7th century BC, the great Sabaean mukarrib and conqueror, Karib'il Watar, launched a campaign that successfully overpowered and defeated Nashshan. This campaign was described in a large inscription called RES 3945, which documents a series of eight campaigns launched over the course of Karib'il's reign. The fifth and sixth campaigns of the eight described are about Nashshan. The battle was difficult, and involved setting Nashshan to a three-year siege. After victory, all dissidents were killed and Saba imposed the cult of Almaqah, their own national god, onto Nashshan: a temple to Almaqah was built in the city after their defeat. Sabaeans were settled into the city. Control over the irrigation systems previously held by Nashshan were handed over to loyalist states. Cities like Nashq moved from a dominion under Nashshan to one under Saba in the aftermath of this conflict. There is evidence that Nashshan was not destroyed in the process however, and that it eventually entered into reconciliation with Saba, with the two allying again in later periods and military conflicts.

=== Joining the Kingdom of Ma'in ===
Between the 6th and 4th centuries BCE, the Kingdom of Ma'in absorbed the once-powerful city-state of Nashshan into its dominion. The kingdom of Ma'in at the time was composed of a confederation primarily between the cities of Ma'in and Baraqish: Nashshan's position in the kingdom was secondary to these two. The integration of Nashshan under Ma'in also coincided with the replacement of the traditional pantheon of Nashshan with the one from Ma'in. However, the restoration of the Nashshanite pantheon is evident after Ma'in falls.

== Culture ==
Nashshān, was in Wādī Madhāb, to the north-east of Ma'rib and was a trading center and town in Pre-Islamic Arabia. Nashshān, and its neighbours, Haram (Yemen), Kaminahu and Inabba' were similar in that they were civil temple settlements and city states, and inscriptions in all four towns are in the Minaean language.

== Sources ==
- Arbach, Mounir (2023). "Nashshān [Kingdom and Tribe]". Thematic Dictionary of Ancient Arabia.
- Avanzini, Alessandra (2016). By land and by sea: a history of South Arabia before Islam recounted from inscriptions. L'Erma Di Bretschneider.
- Magee, Peter (2014). The Archaeology of Prehistoric Arabia: Adaptation and Social Formation from the Neolithic to the Iron Age. Cambridge University Press.
- Nebes, Norbert (2023). "Early Saba and Its Neighbors". In Radner, Karen; Moeller, Nadine; Potts, D. T. (eds.). The Oxford History of the Ancient Near East: The Age of Persia. Vol. 5. Oxford University Press. pp. 299–375. ISBN 978-0-19-068766-3.
