= Ilīsharaḥ Yaḥḍub I =

King of Saba' and Du-Raydan Ilīsharaḥ Yaḥḍub
- Died: 130
- Other name: Il Sharih Yahdhib
- Years active: 120 – 130 CE

Ilīsharaḥ Yaḥḍub was a king of Saba' who reigned from 120 till 130 CE. At the very beginning of the second century CE, the territory of Sabaʾ was under the control of the Ḥimyarite king ʿAmdān Bayyin Yuhaqbiḍ. In the meantime, Ilīsharaḥ Yaḥḍub prince (qayl) of the tribe of dhū-Shibāmum, fraction of Bakil (CIH 140), rose up against the kingdoms of Qatabān, Ḥimyar, Ḥaḍramawt, and the principality of Radmān and claimed the title of “King of Sabaʾ and dhū-Raydān”. He ruled over a newly independent Sabaean kingdom, with the support of families belonging to the old Sabaean aristocracy of Maʾrib (Ir 3, RES 4150) and tribes from the western highlands: Dhamarī (Ja 568), Maʾdhinum (Fa 94 + 95, Gar Ḍulaʿ 1), Ḥāshidum (Gr 184), dhū-Hagarum (Ja 413).

== In Arabian folklore ==
Ilīsharaḥ Yaḥḍub, also known as Shurahil al-Hudhad ibn Dhi Jadan in Arabian legend, is believed to be the father of the Queen of Sheba. He is described as being a noble king who refused to marry local women; subsequently he then married and impregnated a woman from the Jinn named Rayhana who gave birth to his daughter.

== See also ==
- Karib'il Watar
- List of rulers of Saba and Himyar
