= Kamna =

Kamna may refer to:

- Kamna Jethmalani, an Indian actress
- Kaminahu, an ancient city-state from South Arabia
