= August 2026 Yemen attacks =

On 6 August 2026, the Houthis launched missile strikes on Yemeni army bases in Hadramaut and Marib governorates.

== Attacks ==
The attacks occurred at approximately 10:40 local time (07:40 GMT) on 6 August 2026. From al-Jawf Governorate, the Houthis launched eight missiles as well as drones at military formations in the al-Ruwaik area in Marib Governorate, and the al-Abr and al-Thaniyah areas in Hadhramaut Governorates. They targeted the Emergency Forces, a government-allied armed group. The First Emergency Division has its headquarters in Marib while the Third Emergency Division operates in the Wadi Hadhramaut area.

A military source told Agence France-Presse that at least 58 soldiers were killed, and dozens more were injured.
