= Kaminahu =

Ancient human settlement in Yemen

- Location within Yemen
- 16.168089°N 44.689188°E
- Location: Yemen
- Region: Al Jawf Governorate

Kaminahu (Arabic: مملكة كمنه; Old South Arabic: 𐩫𐩣𐩬𐩠𐩥 kmnhw; modern Kamna) is the name of an ancient South Arabian city in the northern al-Jawf region of present day Yemen, 107 km north-east of Sana'a at about 1100 meters above sea level.

In early times Kaminahu like other towns in al-Jawf such as Ḥaram and Nashan, was an independent city state.

In about 715 BCE Kaminahu was conquered by Yitha’amar Watar I of Saba', after which it annexed Nashan and the neighbouring town of Manhiyat.

Yith'amar left a stela which reads

Yatha amar Watar son of Yakrubmalik mukarrib of Saba dedicated to Aranyada' the patron when Aranyada came back form the territories of Aranyada' and of Nashshan and avenged Nashshan at the expense of Kaminahu because Nashahn had maintained the alliance of Almaqah and of Aranyada', of Yatha amar and of Malikwaqah, of Saba of nashshan, because of ... of god and parton of pact and alliance.

In the war against Nashan led by Karab El Watar. (ca. 685 BCE) and probably in the one against Awsān, Ilsamaʿ from Kaminhau along with Yadhmurmalik from Ḥaram supported the Sabaeans; as a reward Kamninahu was allotted an irrigation canal conquered from Nashan. It seems that Kaminahu was flourishing at this time, because Ilsamaʿ is mentioned in many inscriptions. Building inscriptions also relate that Ilsamaʿ Nabaṭ of Kaminahu built the city fortifications of Nashq. Various dedicatory inscriptions from this period allow us to surmise that in Kaminahu, apart from Athtar Hagar, a special form of the god Athtar, there were local gods Nabʿal and Mdhww were also worshiped.

After the founding of the Kingdom of Ma'īn, in the 6th century BCE, Kaminahu lost its importance.

== Kings of Kaminahu ==
The order and dating for most kings is unclear.

- 'Ammyithaʿ and ʿAmmschafiq (affiliation to Kaminahu uncertain)
- Muhaqim and Ilsamaʿ
- Ilsamaʿ, probably identical with the coregent of Muhaqim
- Nabatʿali (Amir), son of Ilsamaʿ, ally of Karib'il Watar I. (ca. 685 BCE)
- Ḏmrkrb Rym, son of Ilsamaʿ
- S[ ... (possibly Sumhuyafa)
- Ilsamaʿ Nabaṭ
- Wahbu, son of Mas'ud
- Ilsamaʿ Ḏrḥn

== Culture ==
Kaminahu, was in Wādī Madhāb, to the north-east of Ma'rib was a town of Pre-Islamic Arabia. Kaminahu, and its neighbors, Haram (Yemen), Nashan and Inabba' were civil temple settlements and city states. Inscriptions in all four towns are in the Minaean language.
