= Marib-Jawf gas field =

Natural gas field in Al Jawf Governorate, Yemen

Marib-Jawf
- Country: Yemen
- Region: Al Jawf Governorate
- Offshore/onshore: onshore
- Operator: Total S.A.

Field history
- Discovery: 2000
- Start of production: 2005

Production
- Current production of gas: 34.2×10^{6} m^{3}/d 1.197×10^{9} cu ft/d 12.5×10^{9} m^{3}/a (440×10^{9} cu ft/a)
- Estimated gas in place: 286×10^{9} m^{3} 10×10^{12} cu ft

The Marib-Jawf gas field is a natural gas field located onshore in the Al Jawf Governorate of Yemen. Discovered in 2000, the gas field was developed by Total S.A., determining it to have initial total proven reserves of around 10 trillion ft^{3} (286 km^{3}). It began production of natural gas and condensates in 2005, with a production rate of around 1.2 billion ft^{3}/day (34.2×10^{5} m^{3}).
