= Al Humaydat district =

Al Humaydat District مديرية الحميدات
- District
- Location in Yemen
- Coordinates: 16°30′N 44°30′E
- Country: Yemen
- Governorate: Al Jawf

Population (2003)
  - Total: 28,789
- Time zone: UTC+3 (Yemen Standard Time)

Al Humaydat District (Arabic: مُديرية الحُميدات, romanized: mudyryẗ ạlḥumydạt) is a district of the Al Jawf Governorate, Yemen. As of 2003, the district had a population of 20,026 inhabitants.
