= Al Khalq district =

Al Khalq District مديرية الخَلق
- District
- Location in Yemen
- Coordinates: 16°15′N 44°47′E
- Country: Yemen
- Governorate: Al Jawf

Population (2003)
  - Total: 16,561
- Time zone: UTC+3 (Yemen Standard Time)

Al Khalq District (Arabic: مديرية الخَلق) is a district of the Al Jawf Governorate, Yemen. As of 2003, the district had a population of 14,123 inhabitants.
