= Qataban =

Ancient Yemeni kingdom

Kingdom of Qataban Qatabanian: 𐩤𐩩𐩨𐩬
- Early 1st millennium BCE–Late 1st or late 2nd century CE
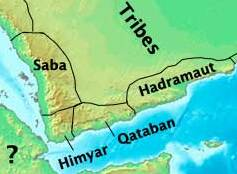
- Qatabān in 100 BCE
- Capital: Timna
- Common languages: Qatabanian
- Religion: South Arabian polytheism
- Demonym: Qatabanian
- Government: Kingdom
- Historical era: Iron Age; Classical Antiquity
  - Established: Early 1st millennium BCE
  - Disestablished: Late 1st or late 2nd century CE
Succeeded by
Ḥimyar; Ḥaḍramawt
- Today part of: Yemen

Qataban (Qatabanian: 𐩤𐩩𐩨𐩬, romanized: qtbn, lit. 'Qatabān') was an ancient Yemenite kingdom in South Arabia that existed from the early 1st millennium BCE to the late 1st or 2nd centuries CE.

It was one of the six ancient South Arabian kingdoms of ancient Yemen, along with Sabaʾ, Maʿīn, Ḥaḍramawt, Ḥimyar and Awsān.

== Geography ==
Qatabān was centred around the Wādī Bayhān, and its capital was the city of Timnaʿ.

The neighbours of Qatabān were Sabaʾ to the northwest and west, Awsān to the south, and Ḥaḍramawt to the east. At its maximum extent, Qatabān's territory extended from the Bāb al-Mandab in the southwest to the Ṣayhad desert to the north, and the western limits of Ḥaḍramawt to the east.

== History ==
=== Prehistory ===
The earliest human occupation in the region of Qatabān dates to around the 20th century BCE and consisted of a Neolithic population. The earliest settlements in the area of Qatabān are from 11th to 10th centuries BCE.

Later, several waves of Semitic-speaking immigrants from the Levant and Mesopotamia arrived into South Arabia, bringing several new cultural elements, including early pottery which similarly appear to have been derived from various sources. The local and incoming cultures eventually gave rise to the ancient South Arabian culture to which Qatabān belonged.

=== Kingdom ===
Qatabān had developed into a centralised state centred around Timnaʿ by the late 7th or early 6th century BCE. At one point during this early period, Qatabān was ruled by two joint kings, respectively named Hawfiʿamm Yuhanʿim son of Sumhuʿalay Watar, of whom several inscriptions are known, and Yadʿʾab son of Ḏamarʿali.

In the late 7th century BCE, Qatabān and the nearby kingdom of Ḥaḍramawt were initially allies of the king Karibʾil Watar of the neighbouring kingdom of Sabaʾ, but soon hostilities broke out between Karibʾil Watar and the Qatabānian king Yadʿʾab. During the 6th century BCE, Qatabān had come under the control of Sabaʾ.

Qatabān regained its independence in the late 5th century BCE, after which it rejected the hegemony of Sabaʾ and became one of the dominant states of the South Arabian region along with Maʿīn and Ḥaḍramawt.

Qatabān was able to conquer Maʿīn, and soon embarked on a successful expansionist policy against Sabaʾ and captured territories until the Bāb al-Mandab from the Sabaeans. By the 3rd century BCE, Qatabān was challenging the supremacy of Sabaʾ in South Arabia. At one point in the 1st century BCE, Qatabān formed a coalition with Ḥaḍramawt, Radman, Maḏay, and the Arab nomads against the Sabaeans. During this period, the kings of Qatabān adopted the titles of mukarrib (lit. 'unifier'), used by local hegemons in South Arabia, and of malik (lit. 'king').

In the 2nd century BCE, Qatabān lost the south-western part of its territory when the tribal confederation of the Ḥimyarites seceded from it around 110 BCE and joined Sabaʾ to form the kingdom of Sabaʾ and Ḏū-Raydān. Qatabān soon started to decline, bringing an end to the prominence it had enjoyed since the 5th century BCE.

The Greco-Roman author Pliny the Elder recorded that, at the time of the failed expedition of Aelius Gallus to South Arabia in 26 BCE, the Qatabānians were proficient warriors.

The kingdom of Qatabān finally came to an end when Ḥaḍramawt and Ḥimyar divided its territories among themselves and annexed them in the late 1st century CE.

=== Legacy ===
While Sabaʾ and Ḥaḍramawt were mentioned in the Table of Nations of the Hebrew Bible, Qatabān's name was not recorded anywhere within it, probably because it was not an independent state at the time of the text's composition.

The Graeco-Roman writer Strabo recorded the name of Qatabān in the form of Kattabania (Κατταβανία), and referred to its capital as Tamna (Τάμνα), while the Roman author Pliny the Elder referred to the Qatabānians as the "Gebbanitae" and called Timnaʿ as "Thomna."

== Religion ==
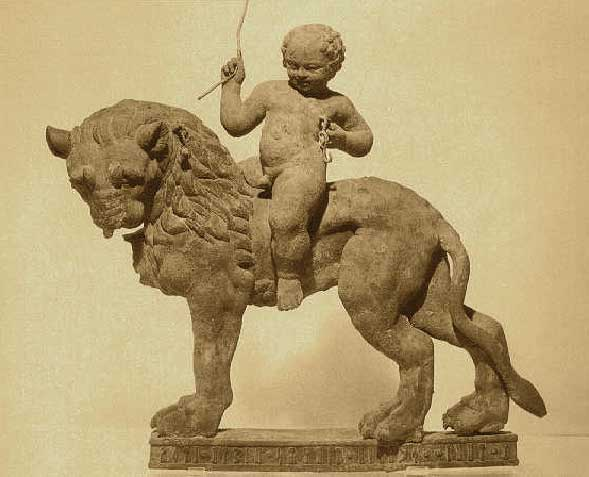
Hellenistic-style Qatabānian sculpture depicting the Moon as a baby boy riding a lion representing the Sun.

The Qatabānians practised South Arabian polytheism, and the god 𐩲𐩻𐩩𐩧 (ʿAṯtar), who held a supreme position within the cosmology of the ancient South Arabians as the god presiding over the whole world, always appeared first in lists, and had various manifestations with their own epithets, also held this primacy within the religion of Qatabān. And, like in the other South Arabian states, the rulers of Qatabān would offer ritual banquets in honour of ʿAṯtar, with the banquet being paid for from the tithe offered to the god by the populace.

The patron deity of the Qatabānians, however, was the Moon-god 𐩲𐩣 (ʿAmm), who was seen as being closer to the people compared to the more distant figure of ʿAṯtar, and the people of Qatabān consequently called themselves the "children of ʿAmm." This prominence of the Moon-God among the Qatabānians was due to their participation in the caravan trade, within which night travel and the use of the night sky for navigation played important roles. Another important deity of the Qatabānians was the god 𐩱𐩬𐩨𐩺 (ʾAnbāy), who was invoked along with ʿAmm in contracts.

The Qatabānians believed in the supremacy of the Moon over the Sun, as attested by a pair of Hellenistic sculptures each depicting a baby boy representing the Moon riding over a lion representing the Sun, with the boy holding a controlling chain attached to the lion's collar in one hand, and a small dart in the other hand.

The Qatabānians followed the South Arabian custom of dedicating themselves and their close family members to the deities as a way of showing their allegiance to the religious community and to receive the deities' protections.

The religious structures of the Qatabānians included temples, which varied from simple to elaborate onces. According to Pliny the Elder, there were 65 temples in Qatabān's capital of Timnaʿ.

== Economy ==
The economy of Qatabān primarily consisted of irrigation-based subsistence agriculture, for which the farmers used well irrigation and also developed flash flood irrigation methods which were more efficient than the constant-flow irrigation systems used elsewhere in ancient West Asian and North Africa. Qatabān also produced myrrh which was sold to Minaean merchants who sold it to markets in the countries of the Fertile Crescent.

The Qatabānians also derived revenue from their participation in international commercial networks, especially from the trade of frankincense and myrrh, as well as from the trans-shipment of products imported into West Asia from South Asia.

The ancient trade route of ancient South Arabia passed successively through Ḥaḍramawt, Qatabān, Sabaʾ, and then Maʿīn, before heading north towards the oases where lived the Arabs, thanks to which Qatabān also derived significant revenue from the transit through its territory of merchant caravans trading incense produced in Ẓufār and luxuries imported from South Asia, which allowed it to act as a mediator in this trade route, thus bringing significant wealth and exotic displays to its ruling classes and institutions.

Trade in South Arabia was initially done by barter in goods against standards of gold or silver or bronze by weight, but in the 4th century BCE the kingdoms of the region started minting their own coinage, which were based on Athenian Greek ones. In the 2nd century BCE, Qatabān replaced these with its own local coinage designs which were struck with its royal mint's name of Ḥarīb.

== List of rulers ==
Known rulers of Qatabān include:

=== Mukarribs of Qatabān ===
- Sumhuʿalay Watar
- Hawfiʿamm Yuhanʿim I, son of Sumhuʿalay Watar
- Šahr I
- Yadʿʾab Ḏubyān Yuhanʿim, son of Šahr
- Šahr Hilāl Ḏubyān, son of Yadʿʾab Ḏubyān Yuhanʿim
- Sumuhuwatar (defeated by Yiṯaʿaʾmar Watar of Sabaʾ)
- Warawʾil (vassal of Karibʾil Watar of Sabaʾ)
- Šahr II
- Yadʿʾab Ḏubyān, son of Šahr II (last mukarrib and first malik of Qatabān)

=== Maliks of Qatabān ===
- Yadʿʾab Ḏubyān, son of Šahr (last mukarrib and first malik of Qatabān)
- Šahr Hilāl, son of Yadʿʾab Ḏubyān
- Nabaṭʿamm, son of Šahr Hilāl
- Ḏimriʿalay
- Yadʿʾab Yagil, son of Ḏimriʿalay
- Abišibām
- Šahr Ġaylān, son of Abišibām
- Biʿamm, son of Šahr Ġaylān
- Yadʿʾab (Yagil ?), son of Šahr Ġaylān and brother of Biʿamm
- Šahr Yagil, son of Yadʿʾab (Yagil ?) (conquered Maʿīn)
- Šahr Hilāl Yuhanʿim, son of Yadʿʾab (Yagil ?) and brother of Šahr Yagil
- Yadʿʾab Ḏubyān Yuhargib
- Fariʿkarib
- Yadʿʾab Ġaylān, son of Fariʿkarib
- Hawfiʿamm Yuhanʿim II
- Šahr Yagil Yuhargib, son of Hawfiʿamm Yuhanʿim II
- Warawʾil Ġaylān Yuhanʿim, son of Šahr Yagil Yuhargib
- Fariʿkarib Yuhawḍiʿ, son of Šahr Yagil Yuhargib and brother of Warawʾil Ġaylān Yuhanʿim
- Yadʿʾab Yanuf
- Ḏariʾkarib
- Šahr Hilāl Yuhaqbiḍ, son of Ḏariʾkarib

== Bibliography ==
- Albright, W. F. (1950). "The Chronology of Ancient South Arabia in the Light of the First Campaign of Excavation in Qataban". Bulletin of the American Schools of Oriental Research. 119 (119): 5–15. doi:10.2307/3218798. JSTOR 3218798. S2CID 163250611.
- Bryce, Trevor (2009). The Routledge Handbook of the Peoples and Places of Ancient Western Asia: From the Early Bronze Age to the Fall of the Persian Empire. London, United Kingdom: Routledge. ISBN 978-0-415-39485-7.
- Alessandro de Maigret. Arabia Felix, translated Rebecca Thompson. London: Stacey International, 2002. ISBN 1-900988-07-0
- Hoyland, Robert G. (2002). Arabia and the Arabs: From the Bronze Age to the Coming of Islam. London, United Kingdom: Routledge. ISBN 978-1-134-64634-0.
- Kitchen, Kenneth (2001). "Economics in Ancient Arabia from Alexander to the Augustans". In Archibald, Zofia H.; Davies, John; Gabrielsen, Vincent; Oliver, G. J. (eds.). Hellenistic Economies. London, United Kingdom: Routledge. pp. 119–132. ISBN 978-1-134-56592-4.
- Andrey Korotayev. Ancient Yemen. Oxford: Oxford University Press, 1995 Archived 2018-11-16 at the Wayback Machine. ISBN 0-19-922237-1.
- Andrey Korotayev. Pre-Islamic Yemen. Wiesbaden: Harrassowitz Verlag, 1996. ISBN 3-447-03679-6.
- Andrey Korotayev. Socio-Political Conflict in the Qatabanian Kingdom? (A re-interpretation of the Qatabanic inscription R 3566) // Proceedings of the Seminar for Arabian Studies 27 (1997): 141–158 Archived 2023-04-11 at the Wayback Machine.
- Raoul McLaughlin (2014). The Roman Empire and the Indian Ocean (Hardcover). Pen & Sword Military. p. 138. ISBN 9781783463817.
- Merighi, Francesca; Liverani, Mario, eds. (2003). Arid Lands in Roman Times (Paperback). All'insegna del giglio. p. 144. ISBN 9788878142664.
- Van Beek, Gus W. (1997). "Qataban". In Meyers, Eric M.; Dever, William G.; Meyers, Carol L.; Muhly, James D.; Pardee, Dennis; Sauer, James A.; Finney, Paul Corby; Jorgensen, John S. (eds.). The Oxford Encyclopedia of Archaeology in the Near East. Vol. 4. Oxford, United Kingdom; New York City, United States: Oxford University Press. pp. 383–384. ISBN 978-0-195-06512-1.
- Schiettecatte, Jérémie (2017). "Himyar". The Encyclopedia of Ancient History (PDF). John Wiley & Sons, Inc. pp. 1–2. doi:10.1002/9781444338386.wbeah30219. ISBN 9781405179355.
