= Al Ghayl district =

Al Ghayl district مديرية الغيل
- District
- Location in Yemen
- Coordinates: 16.0914°N 44.6850°E
- Country: Yemen
- Governorate: Al Jawf Governorate

Population (2003)
  - Total: 18,433
- Time zone: UTC+3 (Yemen Standard Time)

Al Ghayl district (Arabic: مديرية الغيل) is a district of the Al Jawf Governorate, Yemen. As of 2003, the district had a population of 10,436 people.
