= Al Matammah district =

Coordinates: 16°20′N 44°30′E

Al Matammah District
- District
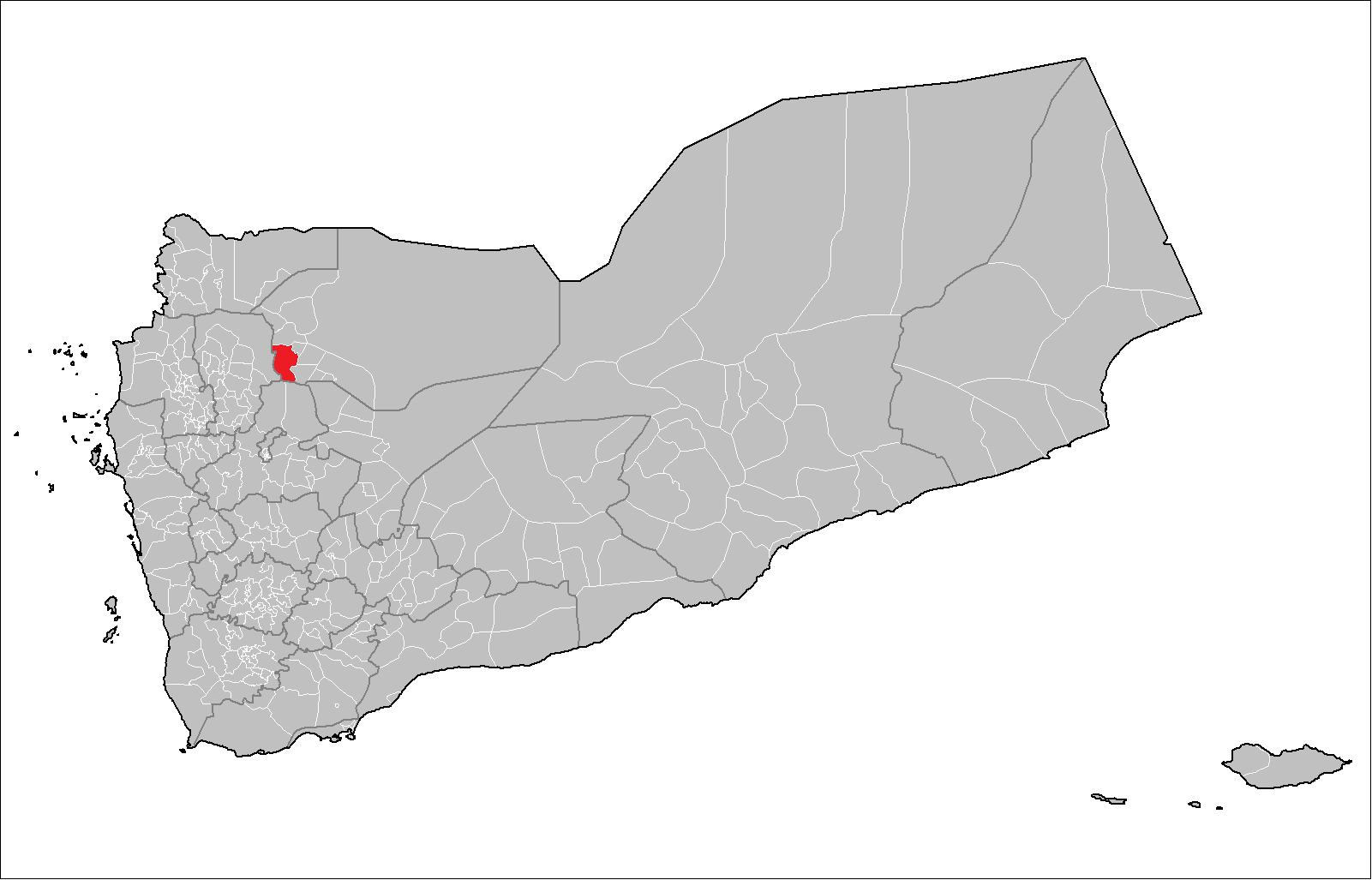
- Country: Yemen
- Governorate: Al Jawf

Population (2003)
  - Total: 39,125
- Time zone: UTC+3 (Yemen Standard Time)

Al Matammah District is a district of the Al Jawf Governorate, Yemen. As of 2003, the district had a population of 28,935 inhabitants.
