= Kharab Al Marashi district =

Coordinates: 16°35′N 44°20′E

Kharab Al Marashi District مديرية خراب المراشي
- District
- Interactive map of Kharab Al Marashi District
- Country: Yemen
- Governorate: Al Jawf

Population (2003)
  - Total: 72,532
- Time zone: UTC+3 (Yemen Standard Time)

Kharab Al Marashi District is a district of the Al Jawf Governorate, Yemen. As of 2003, the district had a population of 63,532 inhabitants.
