= Al Maslub district =

Al Maslub District مديرية المصلوب
- District
- Location in Yemen
- Coordinates: 16.0958°N 44.5667°E
- Country: Yemen
- Governorate: Al Jawf

Population (2003)
  - Total: 21,743
- Time zone: UTC+3 (Yemen Standard Time)

Al Maslub District (Arabic: مُديرية المصلوب, romanized: mudyryẗ ạlmṣlwb) is a district of the Al Jawf Governorate, Yemen. As of 2003, the district had a population of 9,938 inhabitants.
