= Rajuzah district =

Coordinates: 16°35′N 44°30′E

Rajuzah District مديرية رجوزه
- District
- Interactive map of Rajuzah District
- Country: Yemen
- Governorate: Al Jawf

Population (2003)
  - Total: 73,723
- Time zone: UTC+3 (Yemen Standard Time)

Rajuzah District is a district of the Al Jawf Governorate, Yemen. As of 2003, the district had a population of 73,723 inhabitants.
