= Yatha' Amar Watar =

Ancient ruler of Saba (d. 695 BC)

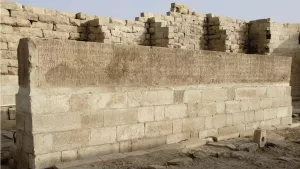
Mukarrib of Saba

Yatha' Amr Watar bin Yakarib Malik (d. 710 BC) was one of the ancient Mukarrib of Saba, who ruled in the last two or three decades of the eighth century BC.

He is the author of the oldest and most important ancient historical documents related to news of the establishment of the state of Saba, which later turned into a kingdom, during the reign of King Karib'il Watar in the seventh century BC.

According to a special archaeological inscription by the Assyrian king Sargon II and the records of Dur-Sharrukin, Itamra of the Saba paid tribute to Sargon II during the seventh year of his reign, that is, approximately the year 715 BC.

== In Assyrian records ==
The Sabaean ruler “Yatha Amr Watar” was mentioned during the reign of Sargon II in the year 715 BC, this is in the following phrases:

From Pharaoh, king of Egypt, and “Šamši,” queen of Arabia, and Atamra of Saba’i, and the kings of the coast and the gold desert, special mountain plants, precious stones, ivory, and maple seeds, And various kinds of aromatic herbs, horses, and camels, and they delivered them to me as tribute.”

“From Pharaoh, king of Egypt, Šamši, queen of Arabia, and Atamra of Saba, give me raw gold from the mountains, and horses and camels.”

== In Sabaean inscriptions ==
The most important source for the era of "Yatha Amr Watar" is a huge inscription discovered in 2005, during excavations carried out by the German Archaeological Institute in the middle of the Almaqah Temple in Sirwah. It is erected in front of the previously discovered inscriptions of Karib Il Watar ibn Dhamar Ali (inscriptions RES 3945 and inscriptions RES 3946, written on opposite sides of the same stone block).These two devotees, each individually, left a wonderful record of his reign through two long inscriptions in the Al-Maqa Temple in the ancient Sabaean city of Sirwah. . Thanks to comparison with Assyrian texts from Mesopotamia, the history of these two inscriptions was identified, and the identity of these two great inscriptions was revealed.
