= Al Maton district =

Coordinates: 16.2869°N 44.6389°E

Al Maton District مُديرية المُتون
- District
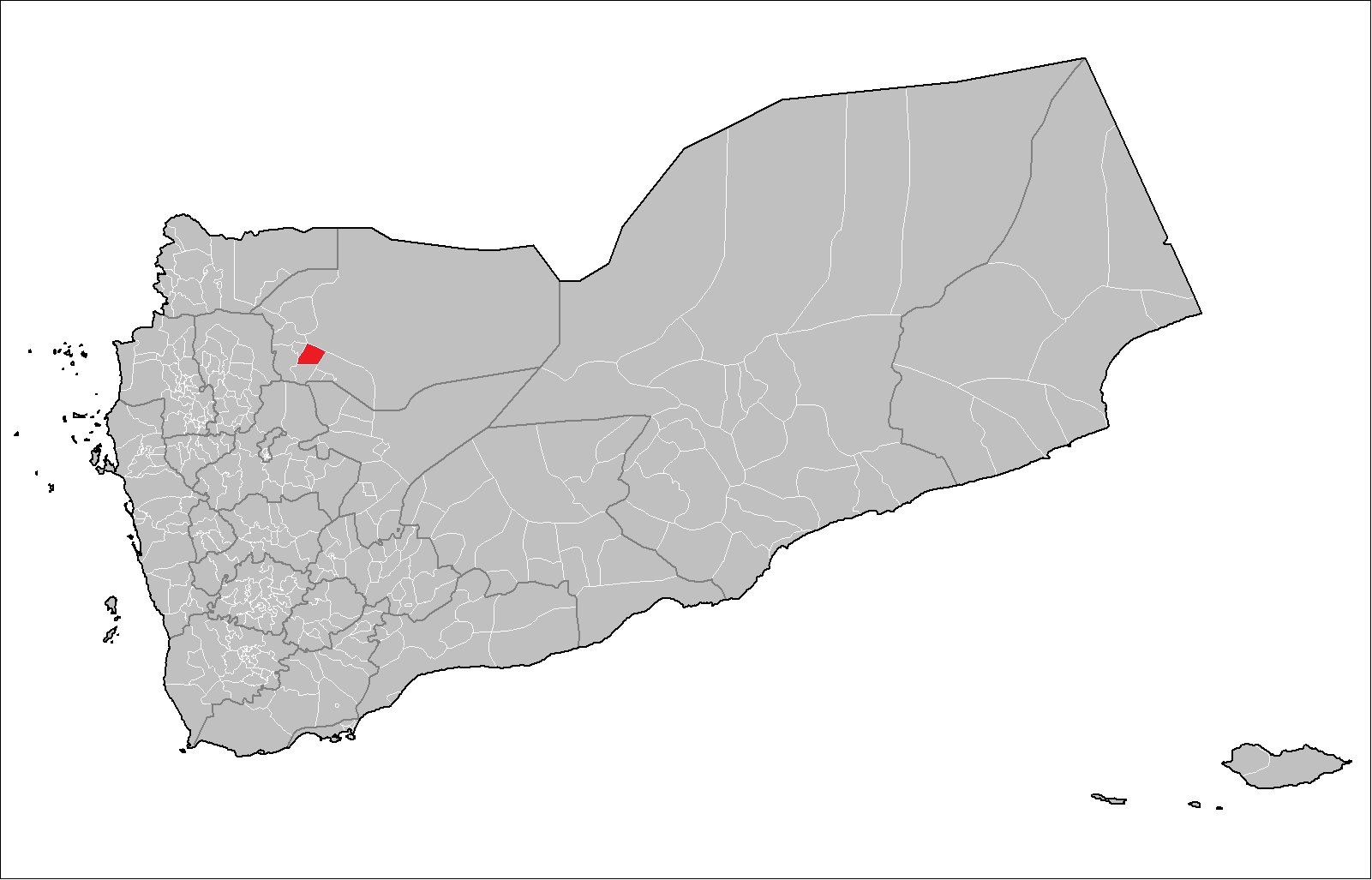
- Country: Yemen
- Governorate: Al Jawf

Population (2003)
  - Total: 51,874
- Time zone: UTC+3 (Yemen Standard Time)

Al Maton District (Arabic: مُديرية المُتون, romanized: mudyryẗ ạlmutwn) is a district of the Al Jawf Governorate, Yemen. As of 2003, the district had a population of 28,411 inhabitants.
