= Qatabānian language =

Ancient Semitic language of Yemen

Qatabānian
- Qatabanic
- Qatabanic inscription from Wadi Bayhan
- Native to: Qataban
- Region: Yemen
- Ethnicity: Qatabanians
- Era: 800 BC – 200 AD
- Language family: Afro-Asiatic: Semitic; West Semitic; South Semitic?; Southwestern?; Sayhadic; Qatabānian
- Writing system: Ancient South Arabian

Language codes
- ISO 639-3: xqt
- Glottolog: qata1238

Qatabānian (or Qatabānic), one of the four better-documented languages of the Old South Arabian (or "Ṣayhadic") sub-group of South Semitic, was spoken mainly but not exclusively in the kingdom of Qatabān, located in central Yemen. The language is attested between 500 BC and 200 AD. Some two thousand inscriptions are known and written in the Ancient South Arabian Monumental Script, known as Musnad. These inscriptions are mainly found in Wādī Bayhān and Wādī Ḥārib to the south-east of Ma'rib, and from the plateau to the south of that area. Qatabanian inscriptions increase after the beginning of the 4th century BC when the Sabaeans ceased to dominate the area, and Qatabān became an independent kingdom.

Qatabanian was spoken in an area across the kingdom of Qatabān as far as Jabal al-'Awd (near Zafar) in the southwest, and if we are to believe the Greek and Latin writers, it went as far as Bāb al-Mandab on the Red Sea. At the end of the 2nd century AD, Saba' and Ḥaḑramawt finally defeated Qatabān, and the inscriptions ended.

The language used to write inscriptions in the kingdom of Awsān, known as Awsānian (or Awsānite), is virtually identical to Qatabānic, but it is so poorly attested (25 inscriptions) that it remains uncertain whether it is a Qatabānic dialect or a distinct language.

== Numerals ==
Qatabānian has an unusual form for the cardinal number "one": ṭd / fem. ṭt; this has no known cognates in any of the ancient Semitic languages, although it does appear in modern South Arabian languages (cf. Jibbālī ṭad, fem. ṭit). Qatabānian also has another word for "one", ˤs_{1}tn, which is cognate with the Minaean ˤs_{1}t (and with forms in Akkadian, Ugaritic and Hebrew). The Qatabānian forms for "three" and "six" are the same as the Old Sabaean words: s_{2}lṯ (fem. s_{2}lṯt) and s_{1}dṯ (fem. s_{1}dṯt).

Qatabānian expresses distributives by repeating the number, thus: b-ˤs_{2}r ˤs_{2}r ḫbṣtm mṣˤm l-ṭt ṭt ywmm "ten full Ḫabṣat coins each for each day".

== Bibliography ==
- Avanzini, Alessandra (2004). Corpus of South Arabian Inscriptions I-III. Qatabanic, Marginal Qatabanic, Awsanite Inscriptions (Arabia Antica 2) (Edited ed.). Pisa: PLUS. ISBN 88-8492-263-1.
- Nebes, Norbert; Stein, Peter (2004). "Ancient South Arabian". In Woodard, Roger D. (ed.). The Cambridge encyclopedia of the World's ancient languages. Cambridge: Cambridge University Press. ISBN 0-521-56256-2.
- Nebes, Norbert; Stein, Peter (2008). "Ancient South Arabian". In Woodard, Roger D. (ed.). The Ancient Languages of Syria-Palestine and Arabia. Cambridge: Cambridge University Press. pp. 145–178. doi:10.1017/CBO9780511486890. ISBN 9780511486890.
- Ricks, Stephen D. (1988). Lexicon of Inscriptional Qatabanian. Rome: Pontificio Instituto Biblico. ISBN 978-8876535703.
- Stein, Peter (2011). "Ancient South Arabian". In Weninger, Stefan (ed.). The Semitic Languages: An International Handbook. Berlin: De Gruyter Mouton. pp. 1042–1073. ISBN 3110186136.
