= Ramlat al-Sab'atayn =

Region of desert in north-central Yemen

Coordinates: 15.7000°N 46.3333°E

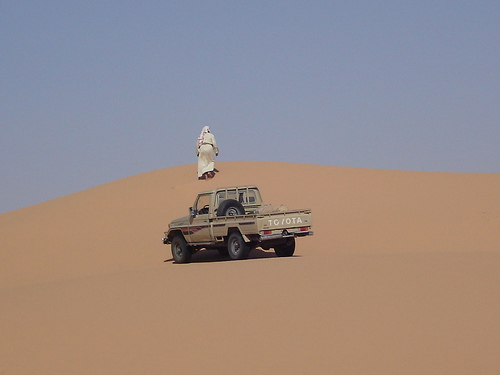
Yemeni Desert.

The Ramlat al-Sab'atayn (Arabic: رملة السبعتين, lit. 'Sand of the Two Sevens') is a desert region that corresponds with the northern deserts of modern Yemen (Al-Jawf, Marib, Shabwah governorates) and southwestern Saudi Arabia (Najran province).

It comprises mainly transverse and seif dunes and covers an area of about 100 by 240 kilometres (60 by 150 mi), roughly 26,000 square kilometres (10,000 sq mi).

The Ramlat as Sab'atayn includes part of what was known to medieval Arab geographers as the Sayhad (Arabic: صيهد, romanized: Ṣayhad). It extends from al-Khawr to the edge of the Rub' al-Khālī or Empty Quarter. It includes the Yemeni muhafazahs of al-Jawf, Ma'rib and Shabwa.
