= Nashaq =

Ancient city in Yemen

- Location within Yemen
- 16°11′N 44°30′E
- Location: Yemen
- Region: Al Jawf Governorate

Nashaq (Minaean: 𐩬𐩦𐩤 romanized: Nšq; modern day Kharbat Al-Bayda', Arabic: خربة البيضاء) is the name of an ancient South Arabian city in the northern al-Jawf region of present-day Yemen, in the territory of the ancient Kingdom of Ma'in.

== History ==
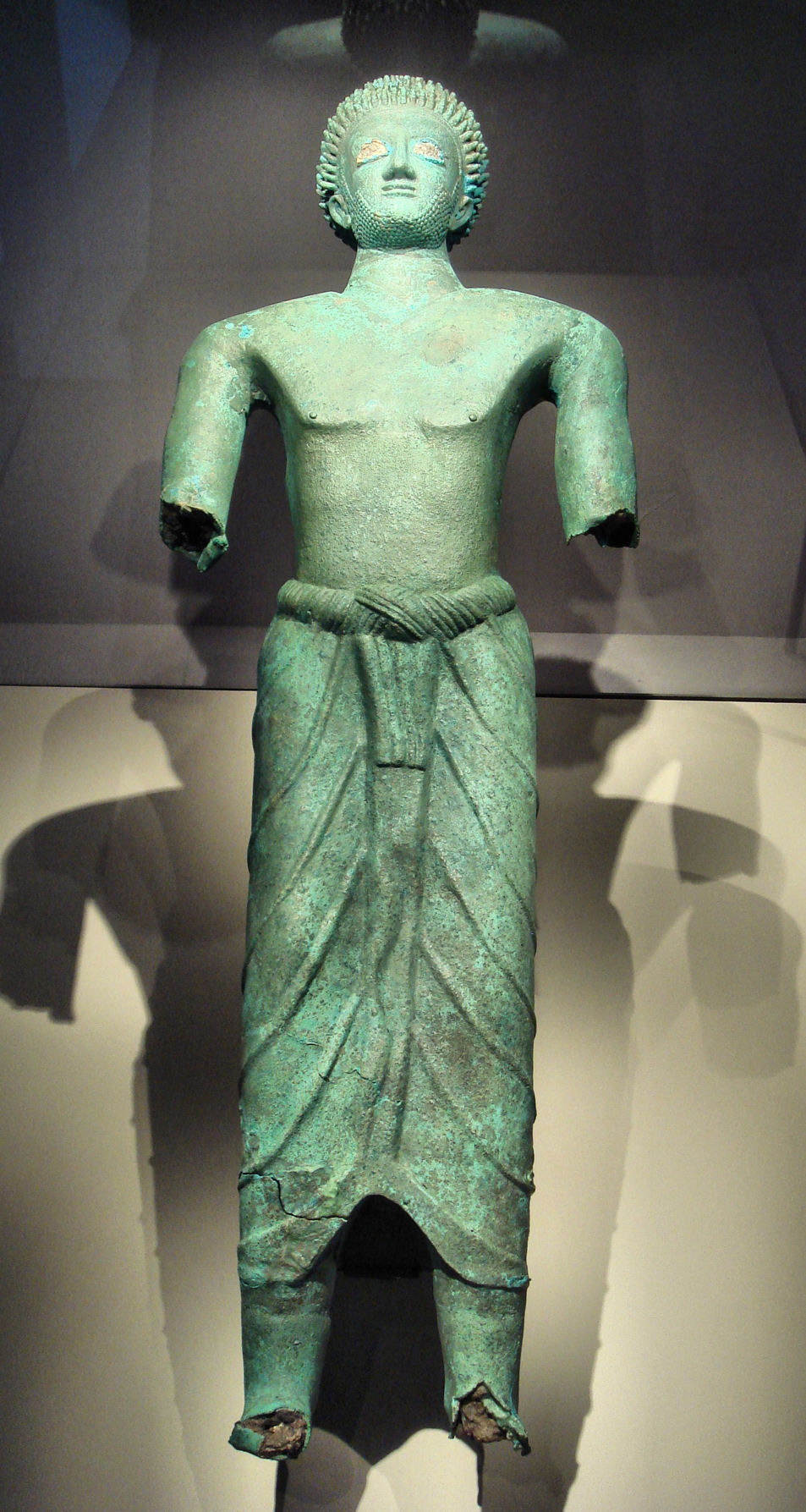
Bronze statue, found in Nashaq

Karib'il Watar (around 685 BC) launched a campaign to capture Nashan and Nashaq which lasted for three years. Eventually, he managed to subdue both cities, and to dedicate his triumph to his god Almaqah.

In 25 BC, Nashaq was mentioned as "Nescus" (Note: Mentioned by Strabo during Aelius Gallus' expedition to Arabia Felix.) during Aelius Gallus's expedition to Arabia Felix under orders of Augustus against Saba'. However, the expedition ended in critical failure and the Romans accused a Nabataean guide called "Syllaeus" of misleading them. This expedition was mentioned by Greek geographer Strabo in which he named Ilasaros as the ruler of Hadhramaut at that time.

== Bibliography ==
- Hermann von Wissmann: The History of the Sabaean Empire and the Campaign of Aelius Gallus, in: Hildegard Temporini: Aufstieg und Niedergang der römischen Welt. II. Principate. Ninth Volume, First Half Band, De Gruyter, Berlin, New York 1976 ISBN 3-11-006876-1 , pp. 308–544.
- Jean-François Breton: The First Towns of South Arabia: The Example of the Jawf in Cities and Temples - Origin of South Arabian Civilization. In: Werner Daum: Yemen, Umschau, Frankfurt am Main, ISBN 3-7016-2251-5 ; pp. 74–78.
