= Mukarrib =

Ancient Yemenite royal title

Mukarrib (Sabaean: 𐩣𐩫𐩧𐩨, romanized: mkrb, lit. 'federator') is a title used by rulers in ancient South Arabia. It is attested as soon as continuous epigraphic evidence is available, and it was used by the kingdoms of Saba, Hadhramaut, Qataban, and Awsan. The title is also found on Sabaic inscriptions from Ethiopia. The title mukarrib has no equivalent in other Near Eastern societies, and it was not used in the Christian era. The mukarrib is only cited when he is the author of the document, but not on legal documents, where the issuer is called the "king of Saba" or the "king of Qataban" instead.

The title appears very early in both Saba and Awsan, and it is unclear which borrowed it from the other. In Qataban, the title mukarrib only occurs in territories on the southern plateau. Qatabanian mukarribs performed many functions: they conducted holy hunts in the kingdom's valleys, guided the army during war, built the walls and gates of the capital, conquered and walled neighbouring cities, and cut mountains to create passes between important wadis.

In Ethiopia, the use of the mukarrib title reflects cultural diffusion from the Kingdom of Saba, stemming from the Sabaean colonization of the area, from which the Ethio-Sabaean kingdom known as dʿmt was established. At the capital of Diʿamat, Yeha, the title "Mukarrib of Diʿamat and Saba" (mkrb dʿmt s-s^{1}bʾ) has been attested, to signify rulership over the Ethiopians in addition to the local Sabaeans that had migrated into the area.

== Definitions ==
The term mukarrib has been variously defined as "priest-kings" or "federators"; the mukarribs may have been the first rulers of the early South Arabian states. Sometime in the fourth century BCE, the title was replaced by malik "king".

Stuart Munro-Hay writes that the title of mukarrib "indicates something like 'federator', and in southern Arabia was assumed by the ruler who currently held the primacy over a group of tribes linked by a covenant." Thus, the mukarrib can be regarded as a South Arabian hegemon, the head of confederation of South Arabian shaʿbs headed by "kings" (ʿmlk). In the 1st millennium BCE, there was usually one mukarrib in South Arabia, but many "kings".

Joy McCorriston took a slightly different viewpoint:

[I]t is clear that early (800-400 bc) political authority resided with one leader - a mlk, or king of his own ethnic tribe ...appointed as mukarrib of a council of tribal leaders. The mukarrib issued edicts that carried out decisions by the council and presided over building projects, ritual hunts, and sacrifices. Some of the most famous inscriptions record the military conquests of mukarribs, who were evidently quite successful in confederating tribal groups through the rites of pilgrimage (at Jabal al-Lawdh, for example) and then using such social cohesion to conscript military forces.

== Vocalization ==
The vocalization of mkrb remains uncertain. The reconstruction mukarrib is based on an active participle of a form 0/2: "he who united, the federator". A.J. Drews has instead proposed the vocalization makrūb based on the passive participle of a form 0/1: "the blessed (by God)".

== See also ==
- List of rulers of Saba and Himyar

== Bibliography ==
- Avanzini, Alessandra (2016). By land and by sea: a history of South Arabia before Islam recounted from inscriptions. L'Erma Di Bretschneider.
- Nebes, Norbert (2023). "Early Saba and Its Neighbors". In Radner, Karen; Moeller, Nadine; Potts, D. T. (eds.). The Oxford History of the Ancient Near East: The Age of Persia. Vol. 5. Oxford University Press. pp. 299–375. ISBN 978-0-19-068766-3.
