= Karib'il Watar =

Ancient Sabean ruler from early 7th century BCE

Karibʾīl Watār Yahanʾm (Sabaean: 𐩫𐩧𐩨𐩱𐩡 𐩥𐩩𐩧 𐩺𐩠𐩬𐩲𐩣, romanized: Krbʾal wtr Yhn’m; fl. late 7th century BCE), sometimes distinguished as Karib'il Watar II, was probably the most important ruler of early Saba. He is sometimes regarded as the founder of the kingdom proper, as he was responsible for changing the ruler's title from mukarrib to malik.

== Name ==
The name Karibʾīl (𐩫𐩧𐩨𐩱𐩡, krbʾl), variously transliterated, (Note: See "Charibael" for a list of the ways various sources have rendered the name.) is probably Sabaic for "blessed by God"; in the case of the early Sabaeans, it could refer to Almaqah. It may also mean "obedient to God" or "obedient to the god".

The name Watar (𐩥𐩩𐩧, wtr) is of uncertain meaning but appears in numerous regnal names in the area.

== Life ==
Karib'il campaigns against Awsan

Karib'il Watar, the son of Dhamar El Yanuf III who reigned in the early 7th century BCE, changed his title from Mukarrib to Malik. He is mentioned in one of the longest and most important Sabaean inscriptions which is located on the Great Temple of Almaqah in Sirwah 40 kilometers west of Marib.

The inscription in Sirwah which is composed of twenty lines describes the military campaigns led by Karib'il Watar. From the first line of the inscription, it seems the author was dazzled by his numerous extensive victories.

Karib'il started his campaigns by attacking western lands of Ma'rib, killing and capturing thousands of his enemies. Then he focused his attention on conquering of south-western sea ports and lands in order to weaken the Kingdom of Awsan.

He continued his advance to reach the lands of Awsan, which was controlling the southern regions up to shores of the Red Sea. Karib'il ordered his soldiers to shed their swords on Awsan's people, kill and capture thousands of them, and burn all their cities all the way to the sea.

Minaeans pose the next dangerous opponent. Therefore, he attacked their cities such as "Nestum" (Note: Nestum was separately mentioned by Pliny in the mid-1st century.) (Nasha'an) and burned them. Afterwards, he besieged the city of "Nescus" (Note: Nescus was separately mentioned by Strabo in his description of Aelius Gallus's expedition to Arabia Felix.) (Nashaq) for three years. The result of the siege was a humiliating defeat for Minaeans and the annexation of all their arable lands and dams, and a tribute have been imposed to their idol Almaqah.

The last ever campaign was to north of Al Jawf near Najran. The outcome of the aggression was a landslide in which Karib'il killed five thousand, enslaved twelve thousand children, and seized more than two hundred thousand cattle.

== Archaeology ==
A number of smaller inscriptions tell us about Karib'il Watar include:

- building inscriptions in the city walls of 'Araratum (today al-Asahil) and Katalum 50 km west-northwest of Marib,
- a showpiece from a temple on Jabal al-Laudh on the northeast edge of the Dschauf.
- a stele, which marked Karib'ils property at fields near Marib.
- two long reports (quoted as RES 3945 and RES 3946), which are located in the courtyard of Yada'il Dharih I built Almaqah Temple in Sirwah.
  - The first text reports the construction of irrigation systems and military campaigns,
  - the second of construction works and land acquired. Thus they give important insights both in Karib'il's politics and in the political situation in southern Arabia at that time.

== See also ==
- List of rulers of Saba and Himyar
- List of wars and battles in pre-Islamic Arabia
