= Al-Jawf Governorate =

Governorate of Yemen

Coordinates: 16°47′N 45°31′E

Al Jawf محافظة الجوف
- Governorate
- Country: Yemen
- Region: Sheba Region
- Seat: Al Hazm

Area
  - Total: 39,496 km^{2} (15,249 sq mi)

Population (2025 est.)
  - Total: 701,864
  - Density: 17.771/km^{2} (46.025/sq mi)

Al-Jawf (Arabic: الجوف, Al-Jawf) is one of the Governorates of Yemen. Located in the northeastern part of the country, it is approximately 143 km (89 mi) from the national capital Sana'a, along the border with Saudi Arabia. It covers an area of approximately 39,496 km^{2} (15,249 sq mi) and is subdivided into 12 districts. Its capital is al-Hazm. According to the 2004 census, it had a population of 443,797, and had an estimated population of 701,864 in 2025.

== History ==
The al-Jawf region was an important centre of ancient South Arabian civilisation since the first millennium BCE, where several independent city-states flourished. The region subsequently became associated with the Kingdom of Ma'in. Al-Jawf is home to several tribal confederations, some of whom opposed the Houthis. Houthi forces clashed with local tribes in the governorate in 2011. During the Yemeni civil war (2014–present), Houthi forces launched a fresh offensive in 2020 and expanded their control over much of the governorate by October 2021. On 15 July 2020, a Saudi Arabian airstrike in al-Hazm district in al-Jawf Governorate killed seven Yemeni civilians. On 17 August 2020, a Houthi missile attack killed 11 government troops, including a senior officer.

== Geography ==
Al-Jawf is one of the governorates of Yemen. It is located in the northeastern part of the country, approximately 143 km (89 mi) from the national capital Sana'a. It is bordered by Saada Governorate to the west, Amran Governorate to the west, Sana'a Governorate to the southwest, Marib Governorate to the south, and Hadhramaut Governorate to the east. It shares an international border with Saudi Arabia to the north. It occupies an area of approximately 39,496 km^{2} (15,249 sq mi). It has its seat at al-Hazm.

The governorate rises to approximately 580 m (1,900 ft) above sea level. The topography consists of largely desert plains. It experiences a desert climate with hot summers. During winters, the temperatures are moderate during the day and cold at night.

== Administration and sub-divisions ==
The governorate is administered by a local council consisting of 24 members and the governor. Al-Jawf Governorate is divided into 12 districts.

Districts
| District | Size (km²) | Population | | |
| District | Size (km²) | Total | Male | Female |
|---|---|---|---|---|
| Al Ghayl | 151 | 8,664 | 4,410 | 4,254 |
| Al Hazm | 1,601 | 33,802 | 17,191 | 16,611 |
| Al Humaydat | 512 | 33,224 | 16,899 | 16,325 |
| Al Khalq | 92 | 24,910 | 12,668 | 12,242 |
| Al Maslub | 360 | 22,650 | 11,519 | 11,131 |
| Al Matammah | 739 | 48,442 | 24,639 | 23,803 |
| Al Maton | 418 | 47,844 | 24,337 | 23,507 |
| Bart Al Anan | 1,586 | 90,248 | 45,902 | 44,346 |
| Khabb wa ash Sha'af | 32,51 | 116,557 | 59,284 | 57,273 |
| Kharab Al Marashi | 392 | 110,601 | 56,255 | 54,346 |
| Rajuzah | 999 | 123,059 | 62,591 | 60,468 |
| Az Zahir | 136 | 41,863 | 21,293 | 20,570 |
| Total | 39,495 | 701,864 | 356,988 | 344,876 |

== Demographics ==
According to the 2004 census, al-Jawf Governorate had a population of 443,797, comprising 202,660 females and 241,137 males. The population was estimated to be 532,000 in 2011. According to a 2025 estimate, its population was 701,864, comprising 344,876 females and 356,988 males.

== Economy ==
Agriculture and livestock breeding are the principal economic activities in al-Jawf. The governorate contributes approximately 5.8% of Yemen's total agricultural production. Major crops include cereals, vegetables, fruits and fodder crops. The al-Jabali mine has deposits of silver and zinc.

In 2014, central government grants and subsidies accounted for approximately 99% of the governorate's total budget, while locally generated revenues accounted for only 1%. The poverty rate was estimated at 55% in the same year.
