= List of World Heritage Sites in Yemen =

Location of World Heritage Sites in Yemen. Red dots represent cultural sites, the green dot is a natural site.

The United Nations Educational, Scientific and Cultural Organization (UNESCO) designates World Heritage Sites of outstanding universal value to cultural or natural heritage which have been nominated by countries which are signatories to the UNESCO World Heritage Convention, established in 1972. Cultural heritage consists of monuments (such as architectural works, monumental sculptures, or inscriptions), groups of buildings, and sites (including archaeological sites). Natural heritage consists of natural features (physical and biological formations), geological and physiographical formations (including habitats of threatened species of animals and plants), and natural sites which are important from the point of view of science, conservation, or natural beauty. Yemen ratified the convention on 7 October 1980.

As of 2023, Yemen has five sites on the list. The first site, the Old Walled City of Shibam, was designated in 1982. The most recent site listed was Landmarks of the Ancient Kingdom of Saba in Marib in 2023. The Socotra Archipelago was listed in 2008, and it is the only natural site in Yemen, while the other four are cultural. All four cultural sites are listed as endangered. The Historic Town of Zabid was listed in 2000 because of the deteriorating state of the historic buildings. Shibam and the Old City of Sanaa were listed in 2015 and Marib in 2023 due to Yemeni Civil War threats. Yemen has nine sites on its tentative list. The country served as a member of the World Heritage Committee in the years 1985–1991.

== World Heritage Sites ==
UNESCO lists sites under ten criteria; each entry must meet at least one of the criteria. Criteria i through vi are cultural, and vii through x are natural.

† In danger

World Heritage Sites
| Site | Image | Location (governorate) | Year listed | UNESCO data | Description |
|---|---|---|---|---|---|
| Old Walled City of Shibam† | High mudbrick buildings | Hadhramaut | 1982 | 192; iii, iv, v (cultural) | The 16th-century walled city of Shibam is located on the edge of a giant flood wadi between the mountains on an important caravan trade route. The city has several multi-storey mudbrick houses, representing one of the oldest examples of high-rise urban planning. It is also a prominent example of the traditional architecture of the Hadharem between the 16th and 19th centuries. Floods pose a risk to the city as traditional water management systems have been gradually abandoned. Furthermore, installing a modern water supply with inadequate drainage and changes in livestock management have contributed to the deteriorating city condition. The site has been listed as endangered since 2015 due to the threats posed by the Yemeni Civil War. |
| Old City of Sana'a† | Walled city with traditional mudbrick houses decorated with white details | Sanaa | 1986 | 385; iv, v, vi (cultural) | The city of Sanaa has been inhabited for more than 2500 years. It played a crucial role in Islam's early years, with the Great Mosque being the first mosque constructed outside Mecca and Medina. The city is one of the original centres from which the faith spread. The walled city comprises many traditional multi-storey houses built of rammed earth and burned brick, decorated by patterns made in brick and white gypsum. The city is threatened by new constructions and improper conservation practices. The site has been listed as endangered since 2015 due to the threats posed by the Yemeni Civil War. |
| Historic Town of Zabid† | Houses in traditional style, look from an elevated perspective | Al Hudaydah | 1993 | 611; iii (cultural) | The coastal town of Zabid was Yemen's capital from the 13th to 15th century. It was a fortified town, with four gates, watchtowers, a citadel, and wall fragments still remaining. It was an important centre of learning during the early Islamic period from the 7th century on, with a large number of mosques and madrasas. The architecture, in particular the Tihamah-style courtyard house, is typical for the southern coast of the Arabian Peninsula. The historic character of the town is threatened by new concrete and steel constructions and overhead electrical cables. The site has been listed as endangered since 2000 because of the deteriorating state of the historic buildings. |
| Socotra Archipelago | A large tree in a rocky landscape | Socotra | 2008 | 1263; x (natural) | The Socotra Archipelago comprises four islands and two rocky islets. Both land and marine area are exceptionally rich in biodiversity. The islands are home to many endemic plant species (Dracaena cinnabari pictured), as well as endemic reptile and land snail species. The islands support land and marine bird populations while the marine areas are home to coral reefs with numerous species of fish, crab, lobster, and shrimp. |
| Landmarks of the Ancient Kingdom of Saba, Marib† | Temple ruins with several standing columns | Marib | 2023 | 1700; iii, iv (cultural) | Marib was the centre of the Sabaean Kingdom, possibly the Kingdom of Sheba. The kingdom controlled much of the incense trade across the Arabian Peninsula and played a major role in cultural exchange with the Mediterranean and East Africa. The monuments date from the 1st millennium BCE to the arrival of Islam around 630 CE. They include the Barran Temple, the Awam Temple (pictured), the ancient city of Marib, Old Marib Dam, and the ancient city of Sirwah. The site was immediately listed as endangered due to the threats posed by the Yemeni Civil War. |

== Tentative list ==
In addition to sites inscribed on the World Heritage List, member states can maintain a list of tentative sites that they may consider for nomination. Nominations for the World Heritage List are only accepted if the site was previously listed on the tentative list. As of 2025, Yemen has listed 35 properties on its tentative list.

Tentative sites
| Site | Image | Location (governorate) | Year listed | UNESCO criteria | Description |
|---|---|---|---|---|---|
| The Historic City of Thula | Look from above at fortification steps and a city below | 'Amran | 2002 | i, iii, iv (cultural) | The city of Thula dates to the Himyarite Kingdom period. The walled city is well preserved, with stone houses with three to five floors built in a consistent style, narrow streets, a 12th-century mosque, and a 15th-century hammam. There is a fortress on the top of a cliff under which the city is located. |
| Jabal Haraz | Mountains with terraces and a house on the slope | Sanaa | 2002 | (mixed) | The mountainous region of Jabal Haraz was a caravan stopping point during the Himyarite Kingdom and a stronghold during the Sulayhid dynasty in the 11th century. The cultural landscape comprises fortified villages on the mountain slopes and the terraces in these slopes that were used to grow alfalfa, millet, coffee, khat, and other crops. Settlements include Manakha and AI-Hajjara that both date to the 12th century. |
| Jabal Bura | A valley with some vegetation | Al Hudaydah | 2002 | (mixed) | Jabal Bura is a mountain where the western side is covered by dense tropical vegetation and the eastern side comprises a cultural landscape of hamlets and terraces used for farming. There are five vegetation zones spanning over 2,000 m (6,600 ft), with bananas being grown at the bottom, coffee in the middle, and durum wheat at higher altitudes. The area is threatened by logging, firewood harvesting, and the construction of newly constructed roads in a fragile environment. |
| The Hawf Area | Look from a high point down to the sea, the slope covered by lush vegetation | Al Mahrah | 2002 | vii, x (natural) | The area in Hawf District, together with the Dhofar Governorate in the neighbouring Oman, is important in view of its plant diversity. While most of the rest of the country is arid, Hawf is covered with trees and is home to several animal species. The area is threatened by the expansion and intensification of agriculture. |
| The Cities and Landmarks of Ma’in Old Kingdom | | Al Jawf, Marib | 2025 | iii, iv (cultural) | |
| Al Madrasah Al Amereyyah in Rada' | A mosque with a minaret in white | Al Bayda | 2025 | iii, iv (cultural) | The mosque and madrasa date to 1504 and are masterpieces of the Tahirid architecture of Yemen. The interiors and exteriors were decorated with paintings, stucco, and qadad. The monument was in poor condition until 1978 when several foreign missions began to understand its importance and uniqueness. Renovation took place, where new generation of artisans learned to work with traditional techniques. |
| The Archaeological Remains and Water Management Systems Himyar Kingdom in Dhafar | | Ibb | 2025 | iii, iv, v (cultural) | |
| Shibam Kawkaban | | Al Mahwit | 2025 | iii, iv, v (cultural) | |
| Erf Mountain Natural Reserve | | Lahij | 2025 | x (natural) | |
| Haid Al-Jazil and Wadi Daw’an, Hadramout | | Hadhramaut | 2025 | ii, iii, v (cultural) | |
| Al-Qarrah City, Yafe’ | | Abyan | 2025 | iii, iv, v (cultural) | |
| Tarim City, Hadramout | | Hadhramaut | 2025 | ii, iii, iv (cultural) | |
| Historic City of Al-Mukalla | | Hadhramaut | 2025 | ii, iii, iv (cultural) | |
| Sites of the Cultural Landscape and Heritage Landmarks in Sana'a | | Amanat Al Asimah, Sanaa | 2025 | iv, v (cultural) | |
| The Archaeological Sites of the Kingdom of Hadramout in Shabwah | | Shabwah | 2025 | iii, iv (cultural) | |
| Say'un Palace | | Hadhramaut | 2025 | ii, iii (cultural) | |
| Archaeological Sites of the Kingdom of Qataban in Beyhan | | Shabwah | 2025 | iii, iv (cultural) | |
| Wetland Natural Reserve, Aden | | Aden Governorate | 2025 | ix, x (natural) | |
| The Historic City of Aden | | Aden Governorate | 2025 | ii, iii, v, vi (cultural) | |
| Habban City, Shabwah | | Shabwah | 2025 | iii, iv, vi (cultural) | |
| Al-Hawtah City | | Shabwah | 2025 | iv (cultural) | |
| Balhaf/Burum Natural Reserve | A crater filled with water in a desert | Shabwah | 2025 | vii, viii (natural) | The area comprises the oasis of Balhaf, Qana, a major port of the Incense trade route since the period of the ancient Hadhramaut Kingdom, a volcanic crater lake (pictured), a fishing port of Burum, and the surrounding landscape. |
| Old Incense Trade Routes | | Hadhramaut | 2025 | ii, iii, iv (cultural) | |
| Jiblah city | | Ibb | 2025 | ii, iii, iv (cultural) | Jibla was the highland capital of the Sulayhid dynasty in the 11th and 12th centuries. The city is located in a mountain setting with river gorges and well integrated into the environment, forming a cultural landscape with terraces and small hamlets. The houses in the city are decorated with stucco patterns and the doors are made of carved wood. The Queen Arwa Mosque dates to 1088. |
| The Historic Fortifications of Hudayyedah | | Al Hudaydah | 2025 | iii, iv (cultural) | |
| The Old City of Al-Hudaydah (Ḥārat al-Sūr) | Two camels on a beach | Al Hudaydah | 2025 | ii, iii, iv (cultural) | |
| Shaharah City and its Bridge | | 'Amran | 2025 | iii, iv (cultural) | |
| Sharma-Jathmun Protected Area | | Hadhramaut | 2025 | x (natural) | Ash-Shihr is a small ancient city with the remains of buildings that were built in a mixture of Yemeni, Arab, and Hindu styles. The area is popular with tourists. Bada village has hot spring baths. |
| Biodiversity Sites in Hadramout | | Hadhramaut | 2025 | x (natural) | |
| The landmarks of Ta’iz City | | Taiz | 2025 | ii, iii (cultural) | |
| Al Mokha City | | Taiz | 2025 | iii, vi (cultural) | |
| Historic city of Saada | | Saada Governorate | 2025 | ii, iii, iv (cultural) | Saada was founded by Imam AI-Hadi Yaya in the 9th century. It became the cradle of Zaydism, a powerful Muslim spiritual school in Yemen. The city is surrounded by a wall with 52 watchtowers and 16 gates. In the city, there are multi-storey houses built of earth and brick, palaces, and 14 mosques from the 10th to 16th centuries. The Zaydite cemetery, located outside the walls, is the largest and oldest in Yemen. |
| Dar Al Hajar | Two camels on a beach | Sanaa | 2025 | iii, iv (cultural) | |
| Barāqish City Archaeological Site | | Marib | 2025 | ii, iii, iv (cultural) | |
| Agricultural Terraces in Yemen | | Al Mahwit, Hajjah, Lahij, Abyan, Raymah | 2025 | v, vi (cultural) | |

== See also ==
- List of Intangible Cultural Heritage elements in Yemen
- Tourism in Yemen
