= Al-Masajid (archaeological site) =

Archaeological site in Yemen

al-Masadschid in modern Yemen

Al-Masajid (Old South Arabian Maʿrabum, Arabic: المساجد, romanized: al-Masājid) is an archaeological site from the Old South Arabian-Sabaean period, which lies at the edge of the Yemeni highland-basin, below the Jabal Ṣaḥl mountain range near the border with Qataban.

== History ==
The ancient site derives from the building activities of the Sabaean Mukarrib Yada'il Zarih I, whose reign was placed around 660 BC by Hermann von Wissmann and around 490-470 BC by Kenneth Kitchen. Yada'il Zarih I built the three most important temples dedicated to the Moon god Almaqah: the temple of Awwam in front of the gates of the capital city Ma'rib, the temple of Sirwah, and the temple of Masajid, which was named Ma'rib, after the Sabaean capital city (with which it should not be confused). Around it, Yada'il Zarih I placed fortifications, which are repeatedly referred to as Murad. Inscriptions found on the site have been published as RES 3949 and Gl 1108, 1109, 1122, 1116 and 1120. Jacqueline Pirenne, an expert on Semitic languages, was able to use inscriptions of the site to determine how the visual depiction of Old South Arabian letters changed over time.

== Temple ==
The elliptical temple site is in a poor state of preservation; the temple itself lies in rubble. Only the remains of the foundations give any clue of the building's appearance. The Egyptian archaeologist Ahmed Fakhry, who first described the temple, was able to show that it had been a rectangular structure, of a sort with many parallels. This rectangular peristyle surrounded a courtyard, with a cella on one side. Offerings were placed in the courtyard (see RES 2771 and 2774). The whole complex was surrounded by a stone peribolos wall measuring 100 x 37 metres. On the front side of this, there were three entrances. The middle one of these entrances was given special emphasis by a pillared propylon. The ground plan and form of the structure reflect the prototype of the Sabaean temple building.

The temple was an active religious site for centuries, so it frequently had to be renovated and modified in response to new trends. In the course of time, ornamental elements were added, such as floral compositions and elements influenced by foreign practices. The temple would have contained over-life-size, metal animal sculptures, as well as votive gifts and dedications in the form of inscribed stelae and other figural images.

== Bibliography ==
- Horst Kopp (ed.). Länderkunde Jemen. Dr. Ludwig Reichert Verlag Wiesbaden, 2005, ISBN 3-89500-500-2
- Walter W. Müller. Skizze der Geschichte Altsüdarabiens. In: Werner Daum: Jemen, Umschau, Frankfurt/Main, ISBN 3-7016-2251-5; S. 50–56
- Jürgen Schmidt. Altsüdarabische Kultbauten. In: Werner Daum: Jemen, Umschau, Frankfurt/Main, ISBN 3-7016-2251-5; S. 81–101
- Hermann von Wissmann. Zur Geschichte und Landeskunde von Alt-Südarabien. (Sammlung Eduard Glaser, Nr. III = Österreichische Akademie der Wissenschaften, philosophisch-historische Klasse, Sitzungsberichte, Band 246), Böhlaus, Wien 1964.
- Hermann von Wissmann, Maria Höfner. Beiträge zur historischen Geographie des vorislamischen Südarabien (= Abhandlungen der geistes- und sozialwissenschaftlichen Klasse der Akademie der Wissenschaften und der Literatur in Mainz, Jahrgang 1952, Nr. 4). Verlag der Akademie der Wissenschaften und der Literatur in Mainz, Mainz 1953
