= Al-Masajid =

Al-Masajid is a form of the Arabic word for mosque, and may refer to two places in Yemen:

- Al-Masajid, Sana'a, Yemen
- Al-Masajid (archaeological site), Ma'rib, Yemen
