= List of bridges in Yemen =

== Historical and architectural interest bridges ==
| | Name | Arabic | Distinction | Length | Type | Carries Crosses | Opened | Location | Governorate | Ref. |
|---|---|---|---|---|---|---|---|---|---|---|
| 1 | Shaharah Bridge | جسر شهارة | | 20 m (66 ft) | Masonry; 1 arch | Footbridge | 17th century | Shaharah; 16°11′11.0″N 43°42′23.5″E | 'Amran | |

== Major bridges ==
| | Name | Arabic | Span | Length | Type | Carries Crosses | Opened | Location | Governorate | Ref. |
|---|---|---|---|---|---|---|---|---|---|---|
| 1 | Bridge of the Horns proposed | جسر القرن الإفريقي | 5,000 m (16,000 ft) | 28,500 m (93,500 ft) | Suspension | Rail-road bridge Bab-el-Mandeb | | Al Noor City; 12°35′00″N 43°20′00″E | Taiz; Djibouti | |

== See also ==
- Geography of Yemen
- Transport in Yemen
- List of wadis of Yemen
