= Yuhaqim Yurzih =

King of Sheba (c. 50-95 AD)

Yuhaqim Yurzih Bin Dhamar Ali Dharih Bin Karb Il Watar Yahan'am

King of Sheba
- Reign: c. 85–95 AD
- Predecessor: El-Bein III
- Born: c. 50
- Died: c. 95 (aged approx. 45)

Yuhaqim Yurzih bin Dhamar Ali Dharih bin Karb Il Watar Yahan'am (c. 50–95 AD) was a king of the Himyarite Kingdom, ruling over Sheba and Dhu Raydan.

== Reign ==
King Yuhaqim (also known as Ihaqim) assumed the throne of Sheba and Dhu Raydan (a region centered on Zafar, Yemen) between 85 AD and approximately 95 AD, succeeding El-Bein III.

In 90 AD, Yuhaqim faced a major rebellion led by his uncle Amdan Yahqab, which was focused in the Dhu Raydan area. With support from the highland tribe of Shaddad, Yahqab declared himself king of Sheba and Dhu Raydan in Zafar, minting coins in his own name. Yahqab later ascended to the throne of Ma'rib for a time and built the Amdan Yahqab Gate in the Awwam Temple.

Records suggest that King Yuhaqim responded by going to war against the Raydanian people in the Hakar region (modern-day Dhamar Governorate). His forces destroyed the villages of Illah and reached the area of Al-Hadd in Yafa. However, it remains unclear whether he regained control of Ma'rib or Zafar.

Early inscriptions record Yuhaqim's title as "King of Sheba and Dhu Raydan," but later inscriptions omit "Dhu Raydan," possibly due to the rebellion led by his uncle.
