= Jabal Tiyal =

Sarawat mountain near Sana'a, Yemen

- Location within Yemen

Highest point
- Elevation: 3,515 m (11,532 ft)
- Prominence: 1,125 m (3,691 ft)
- Listing: Ultra, Ribu
- Coordinates: 15°24′45″N 44°33′00″E

Naming
- Native name: جَبَل ٱلطِّيَال (in Arabic)

Geography
- Location: Sana'a Governorate, Yemen
- Parent range: Sarawat Mountains

Jabal Tiyal (Arabic: جَبَل ٱلطِّيَال, romanized: Jabal aṭ-Ṭiyāl), also known as Jabal Adiyah, is a Sarawat mountain located near Sana'a, the capital city of Yemen. At 11,532 feet (3,515 metres), it is Yemen's second highest peak, after Jabal An-Nabi Shu'ayb, as well as the second highest of the Arabian Peninsula.

It is located midway between Sana'a and Sirwah to the east.

== See also ==
- South Arabia
