= Great wall of Awwam =

Sabaean site in Yemen

The great wall of Awwam
- سور أوام العظيم (Arabic)
- Awwam enclosure
- Interactive map of The great wall of Awwam
- 15.404247°N 45.355705°E
- Cultures: Ancient Sabaean
- Location: Awwam, Marib Governorate, Yemen

History
- Built: between 9th-7th BCE

Site notes
- Architectural style: Sabaean

The great wall of Awwam (Arabic: سور أوام العظيم), also called the Awwam enclosure, is an ancient Sabaean wall that surrounds the gardens and the sacred sites of Awwam in Yemen.

== History ==
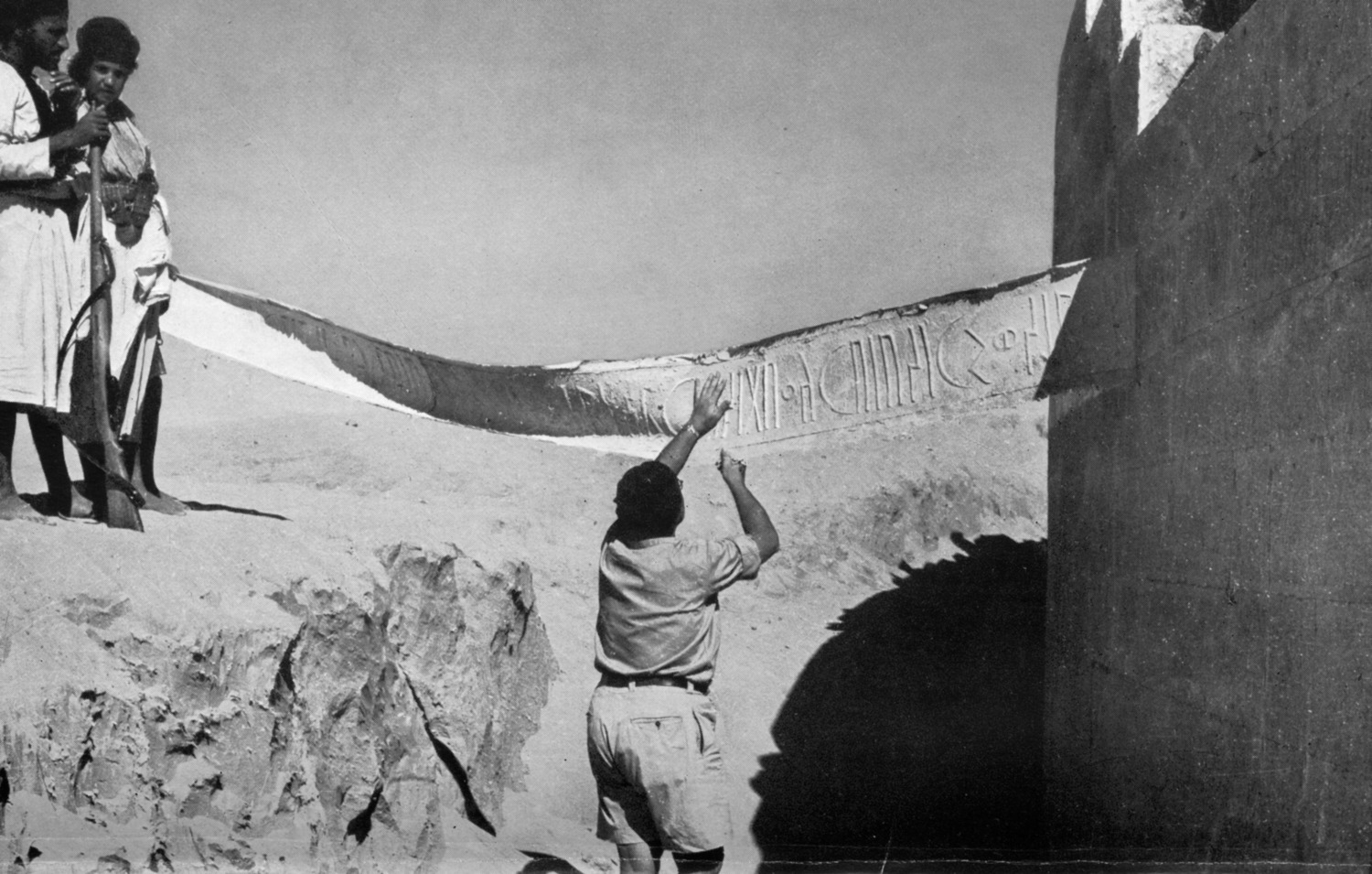
AFSM member with the help of locals copying an inscription from the sanctuary's exterior wall

The earliest inscription found about the gardens' massive enclosure was by Mukarrib Yada`'il Dharih I in the 7th century BCE. The enclosure is defined by a massive oval shaped wall, measuring approximately 757 m long and 13 m high; however the original height length can't be determined for certain.

== See also ==
- Archaeology of the Arabian Peninsula
- Arabia in late antiquity
- Kaaba of Najran
- Khawarnaq
- Prehistoric Arabia

== Bibliography ==
- Francis D. K. Ching, Mark Jarzombek, and Vikramaditya Prakash, A Global History of Architecture, Third edition. ed. (Hoboken, New Jersey: Wiley, 2017).
