= Temple of Meqaber Gaʿewa =

Temple in Tigray Region, Ethiopia

The Temple of Meqaber Gaʿewa near Wuqro in Tigray Region, Ethiopia is dedicated to the Sheban god Almaqah, and contains an altar which represents a miniature model of the Great Temple in Yeha.

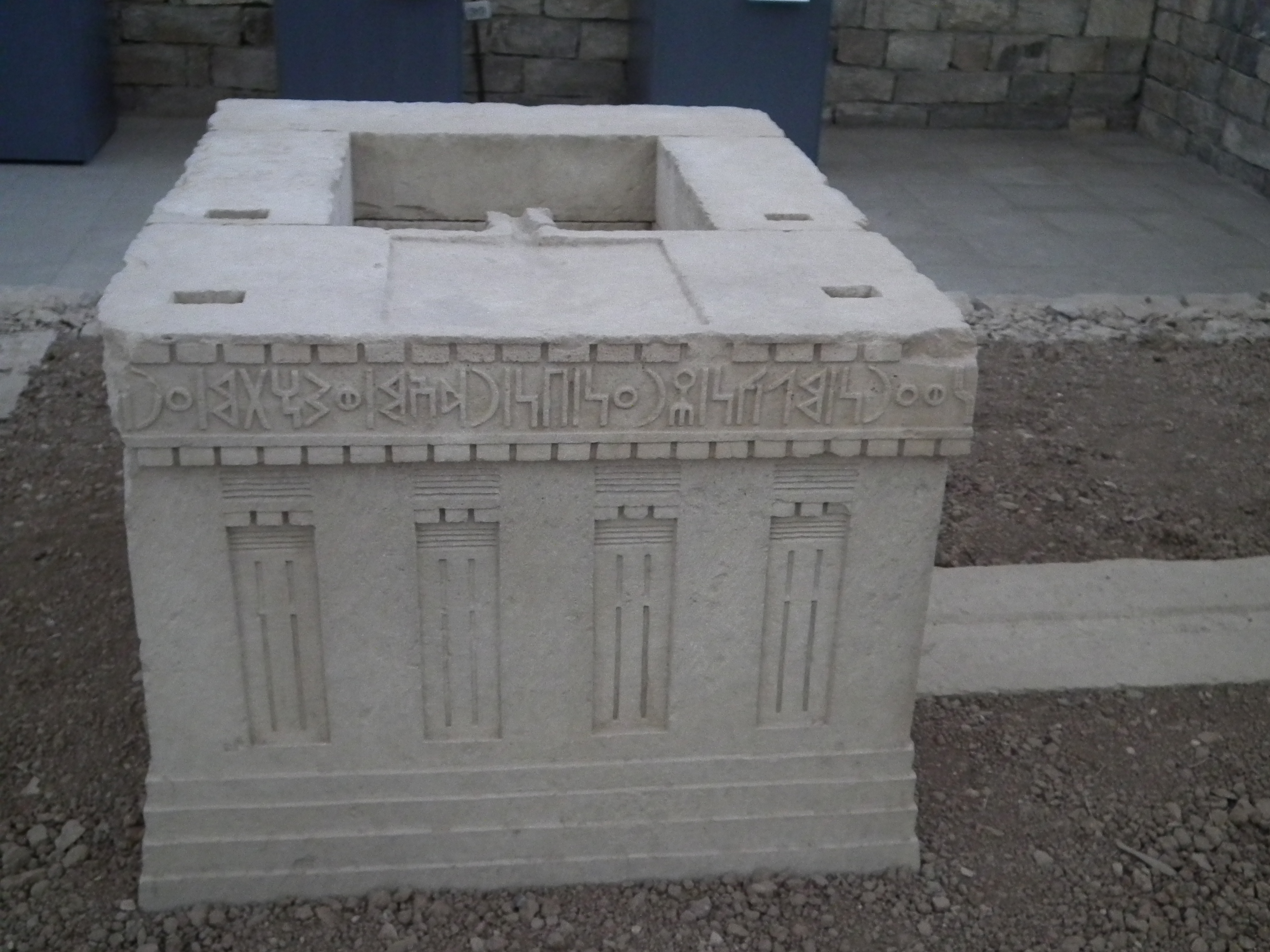
Altar at Almaqah Temple of Meqaber Gaʿewa

== Background ==
An example of "Sabaean-style" architecture. The center of the temple contains a libation altar. The inscription running around the top dedicates the altar to Almaqah. Commissioned by king "WR'N" son of "RD'M," on the occasion of his inauguration as the master of the temple of Yeha. The inscription can be dated to the 6th to 8th century B.C.

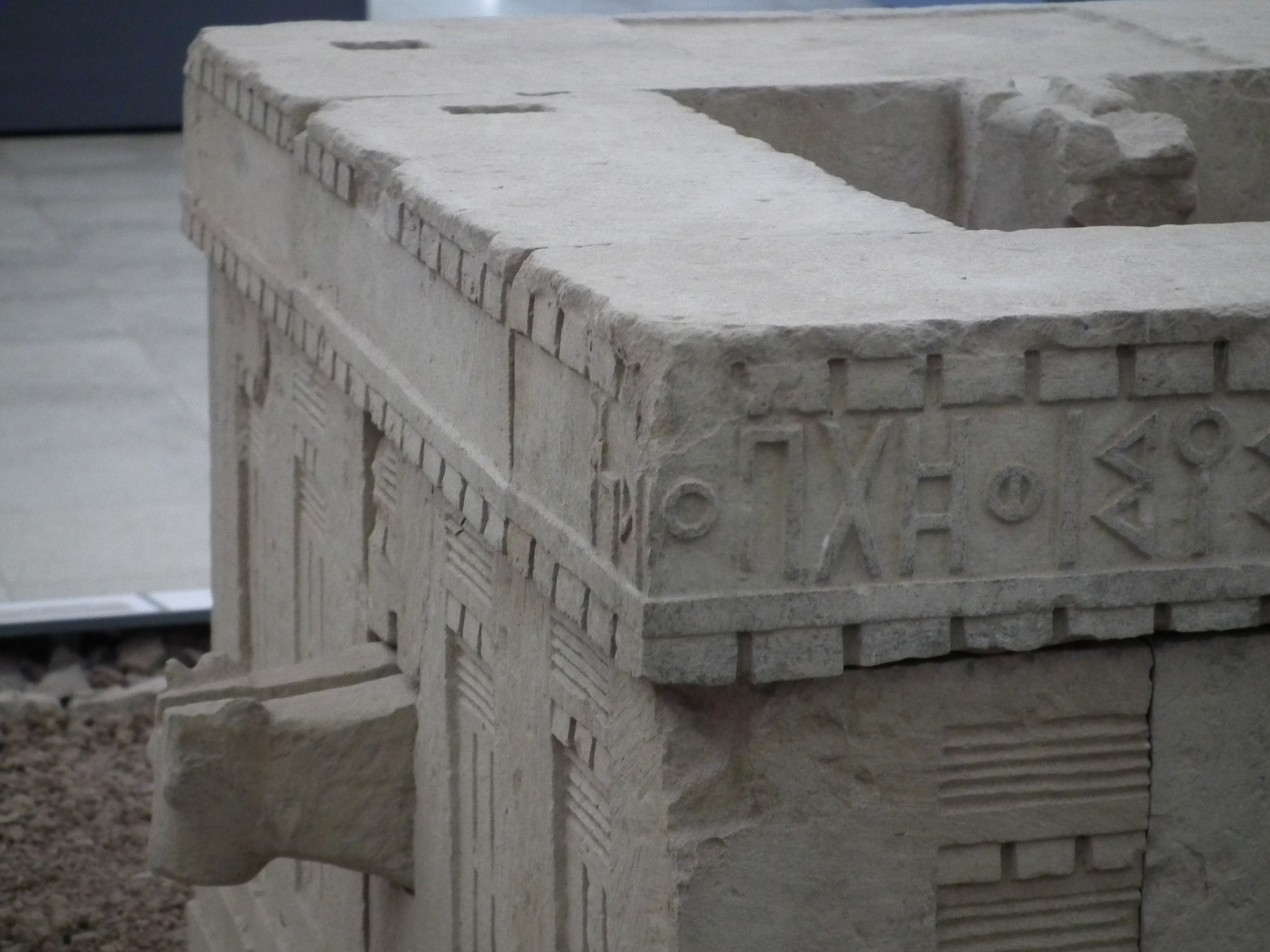
Altar at Almaqah Temple of Meqaber Gaʿewa

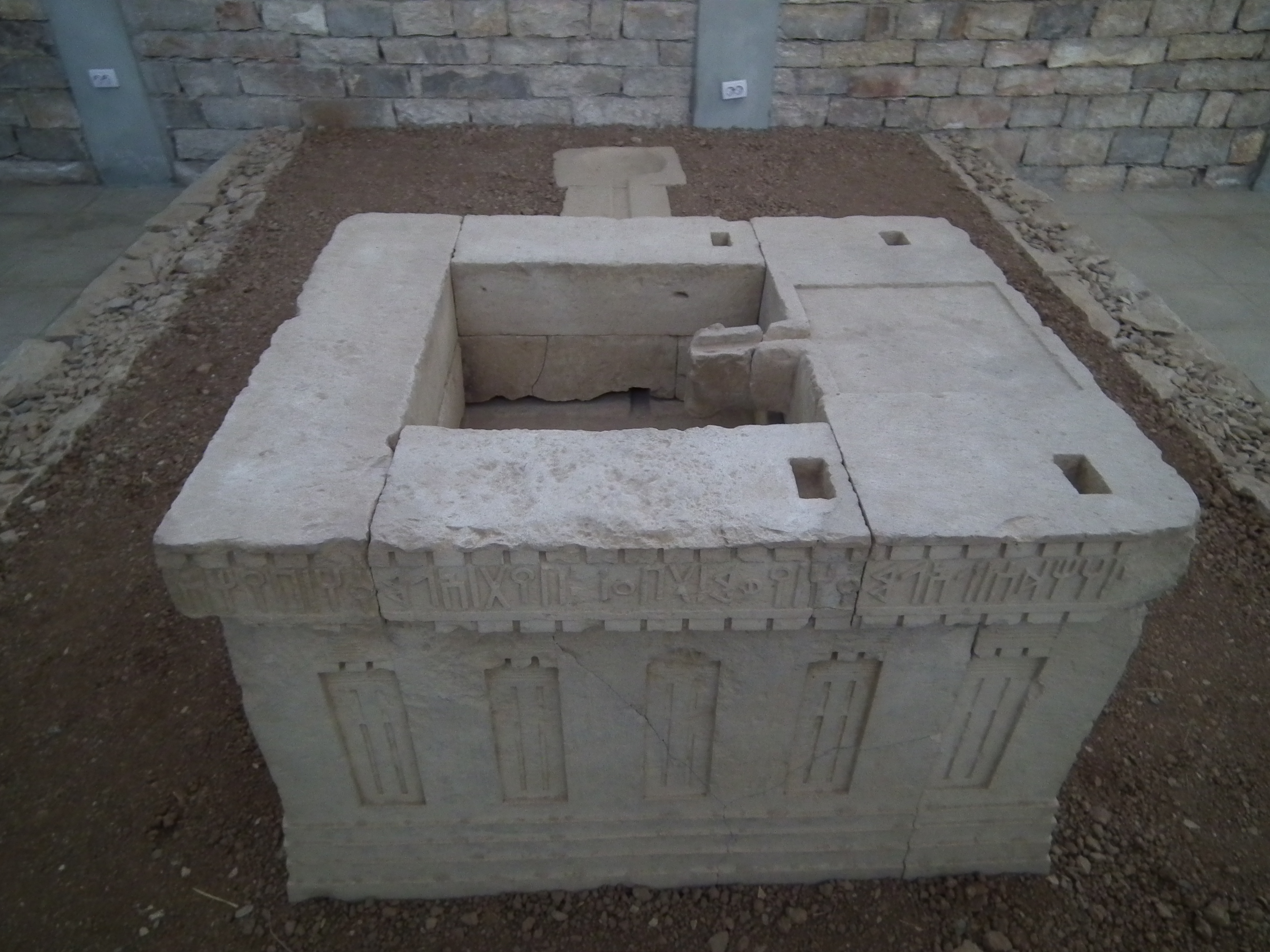
Altar at Almaqah Temple of Meqaber Gaʿewa
