= Sumuhu'ali Yanuf III =

Sumuhu'ali Yanuf I. Mebiy was a Sabaean ruler (Mukarrib) of the ancient South Arabian kingdom of Saba. He was the son of the powerful ruler Yada'il Dharih and is known from inscriptions.

Hermann von Wissmann dates his reign around 660 BC, while Kenneth A. Kitchen places it around 470–455 BC.

The identity of Sumuhu'ali Yanuf's successor is uncertain, though he may have been succeeded by one of his brothers, Yatha' Amar Watar III.

Preceded by Yada'il Dharih I	Mukrib of Sheba; 660 / 470–455 BC	Succeeded by Yatha' Amar Watar III
