= Landmarks of the Ancient Kingdom of Saba, Marib =

UNESCO World Heritage Site in Yemen

- معالم مملكة سبأ القديمة (Arabic)
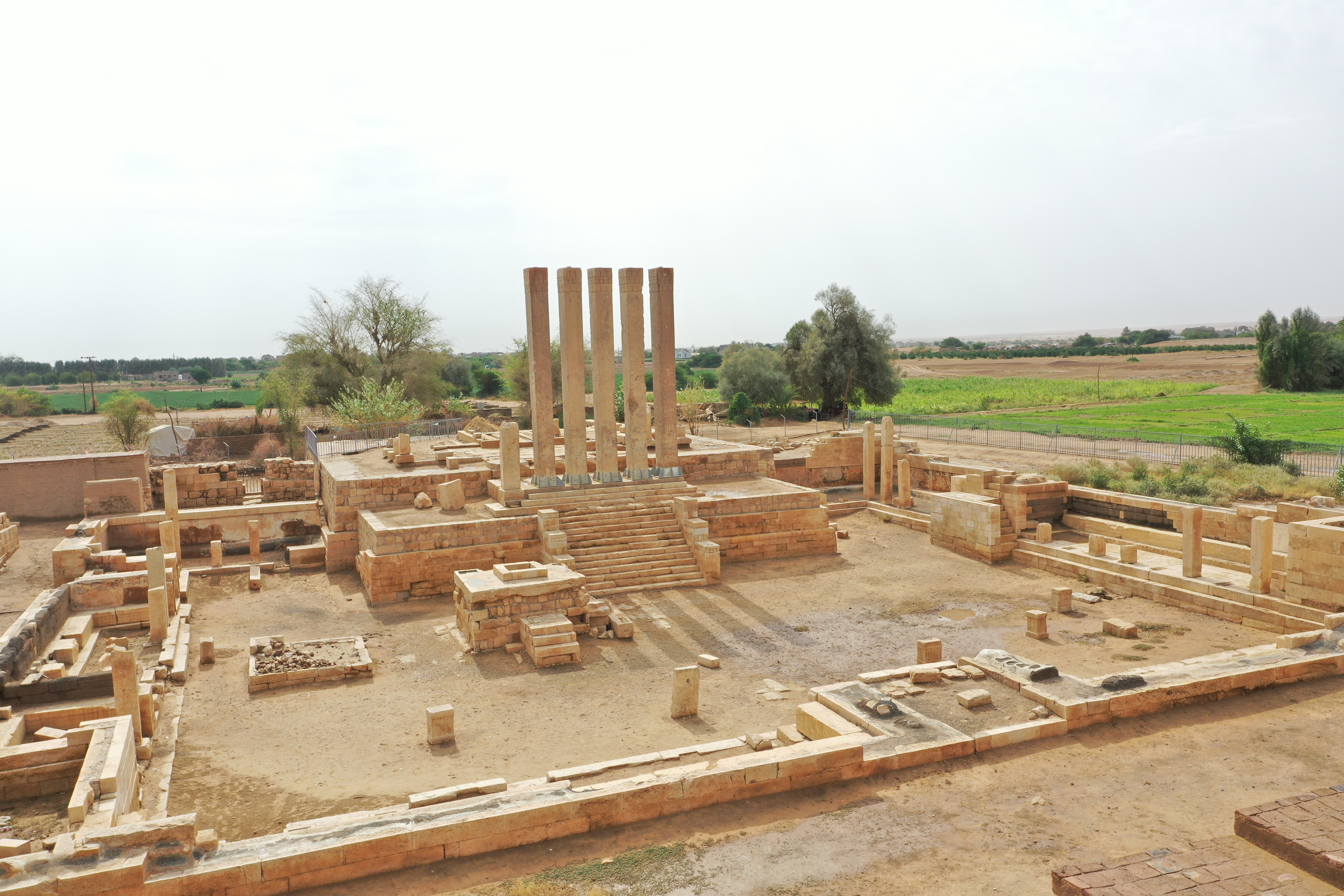
- Barran Temple in 2021
- Interactive map of Landmarks of the Ancient Kingdom of Saba, Marib
- Periods: Ancient Yemen
- Location: Marib Governorate, Yemen
- Region: Arabian Peninsula

UNESCO World Heritage Site
- Official name: Landmarks of the Ancient Kingdom of Saba, Marib
- Criteria: Cultural: (iii), (iv)
- Reference: 1700
- Inscription: 2023 (45th Session)
- Endangered: 2023–...

The Landmarks of the Ancient Kingdom of Saba, Marib (Arabic: معالم مملكة سبأ القديمة, romanized: maʿālim mamlaka Sabaʿa al-Qadīma) is a serial property consisted of seven Arabian archeological sites in Marib Governorate, eastern Yemen. On 25 January 2023, the landmarks have been added by the UNESCO to its World Heritage Site List as they bear witness to the ancient Kingdom of Saba in ancient South Arabia. They were also placed on the List of World Heritage in Danger due to the threats posed by the Yemeni Civil War.

== World Heritage listing ==
Site	Image	ID	Location	Coordinates
Ancient city of Marib		1700-001	Marib Governorate	15°25′39″N 45°20′9″E
Awam Temple		1700-002	Marib Governorate	15°24′16″N 45°21′21″E
Barran Temple		1700-003	Marib Governorate	15°24′11″N 45°20′35″E
Marib Dam: the Northern Bank, the Southern Bank, and the Dam of Jufaynah		1700-004 to 1700-006	Marib Governorate	15°23′51″N 45°16′7″E
Ancient City of Sirwah		1700-007	Serwah, western Marib Governorate	15°27′7″N 45°1′6″E

== See also ==
- List of World Heritage Sites in Yemen
- Ancient history of Yemen
