= Bar'an Temple =

Sabaean temple in Yemen

Temple of Barran
- عرش بلقيس (Arabic)
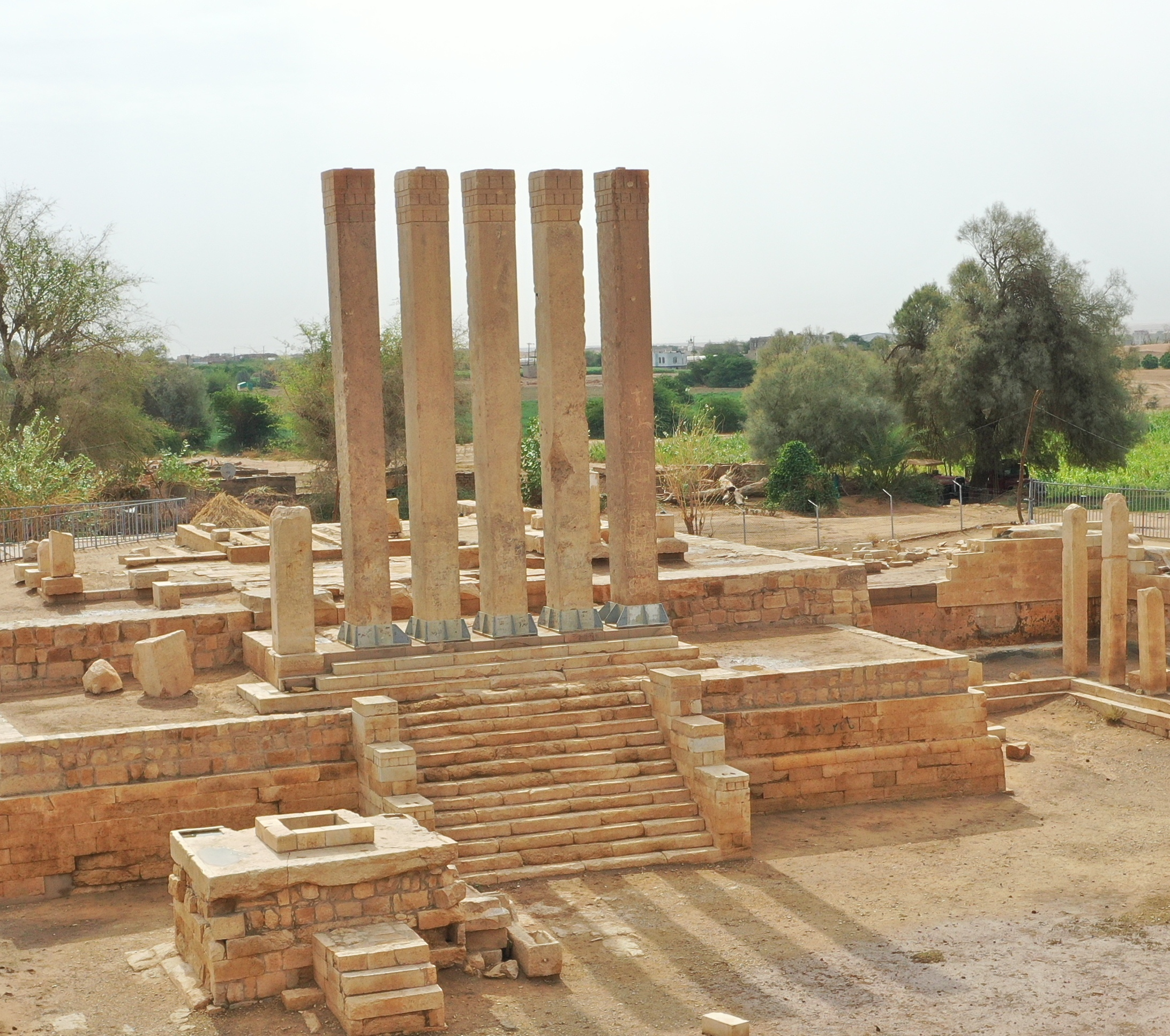
- Bar'an/Barran Temple in 2021

- Location within Yemen
- 15.403227°N 45.343112°E
- Periods: Ancient Yemen
- Location: Marib Governorate, Yemen

Site notes
- Excavation dates: 1951–2, 1988
- Archaeologists: Wendell Phillips

UNESCO World Heritage Site
- Part of: Landmarks of the Ancient Kingdom of Saba, Marib
- Criteria: Cultural: (iii), (iv)
- Reference: 1700
- Inscription: 2023 (45th Session)
- Endangered: 2023–...

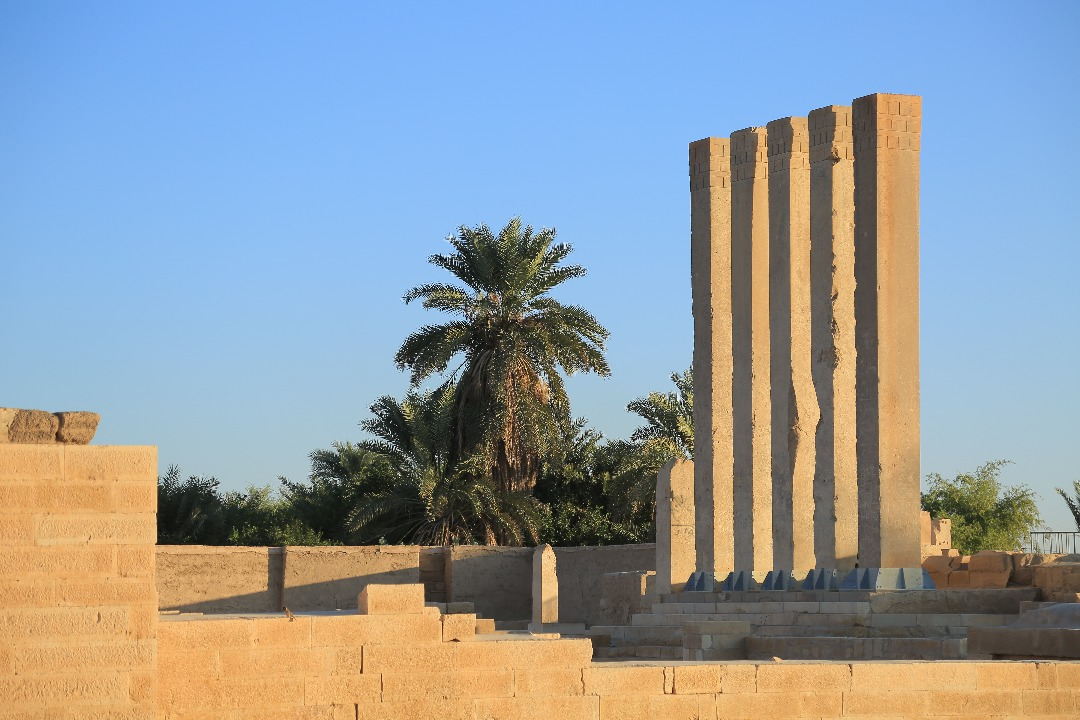
Barran Temple in Marib governorate, 2017.

The Bar'an Temple (Arabic: معبد بران) is a Sabaean temple near Marib, Yemen; also known as the "Throne of Bilqis", it dates back to the 10th century BCE and was dedicated to the god Almaqah.

The Bar'an Temple is an important site in the study of the archaeology of the Arabian Peninsula. In 2023, along with other landmarks of the ancient Kingdom of Saba, the temple was added to the UNESCO World Heritage List.

== Background ==
The temple is located to the west of the Temple of Awwam, also dedicated to the god Almaqah. The main features of the structure are the six columns and the sacred well in the middle of the courtyard. Until the 1988 excavations only five columns were known to exist, when remains of another were discovered. The temple is considered to be the largest pre-Islamic temple in Yemen.

It was partly excavated by Wendell Phillips' expedition of 1951–1952. In addition to its religious functions the complex may have also served as a documentation center, as the inscriptions describing the events surrounding the Sabaean state were found on the walls.

Upright female figurines dating to the first to the third centuries CE have been found with what D’arne O’Neill described as "a necklace-like neck treatment decorated with small holes".
