= Yada'il Dharih I =

Yada'il Dharih I (Sabaean: 𐩺𐩵𐩲𐩱𐩡 𐩹𐩧𐩢 ydʿʾl ḏrḥ), son of Sumuhu'ali I was a Sabaean ruler (mukarrib). His reign was placed around 660 BC by Hermann von Wissmann and around 490–470 BC by Kenneth Kitchen.

== Life ==
Yada'il Dharih was known to people from building inscriptions which record his construction of various monumental buildings. His most significant building project was the Temple of Awwam, outside the gates of the capital city, Marib. He also built the temple of Almaqah in the temple city of Sirwah, and the sanctuary walls of the temple at Al-Masajid, 27 km south of Marib. Some other inscriptions indicate his connection to a place or building named Murad. An inscription which mentions the construction of a tower in Sirwah may also refer to him. His son was Sumuhu'ali Yanuf III.

== Bibliography ==
- Kitchen, Kenneth A. (1994), Documentation for Ancient Arabia, vol. I, Liverpool, p. 198, ISBN 0-85323-359-4.
- Lundin, A. G. (1960), "Yadaʿʾil Ḏariḥ, Fils de Sumuʿalay", XXV Congrès International des Orientalistes, Délégation de l'URSS, Moscow. (in French)
- Lundin, A. G. (1960), "Nadpisi Yadaʿʾila Zariḥa Syna Sumuhuʿalaj", Vestnik Drevnej Istorii, pp. 12–22. (in Russian)
- Müller, Walter Wilhelm (1985), "Altsüdarabische und Frühnordarabische Inschriften", Texte aus der Umwelt des Alten Testaments, vol. Band I, Lieferung 6, pp. 651–667.
- Von Wissmann, Hermann (1982), "Die Geschichte von Sabaʾ II: Das Grossreich der Sabäer bis zu Seinem Ende im Frühen 4. Jh. v. Chr.", Österreichische Akademie der Wissenschaften, Philosophisch-Historische Klasse: Sitzungsberichte, vol. Band 402, Österreichischen Akademie der Wissenschaften Wien, pp. 179–219, ISBN 3700105169. (in German)

| Preceded by Sumuhu'ali I | Mukrib of Sheba; 660 / 490–470 BC | Succeeded by Sumuhu'ali Yanuf III |
