= Wendell Phillips (archaeologist) =

American archaeologist and oil magnate

- Born: Wendell Phillips; 1921; Oakland, California, United States
- Died: December 4, 1975 (aged 54); Arlington, Virginia, United States
- Education: University of California, Berkeley
- Known for: Archaeological expeditions in the Arabian peninsula
- Spouse: Shirley Au
- Scientific career
- Fields: Archaeology

Wendell Phillips (1921 – December 4, 1975) was an American archaeologist and oil magnate who led some of the first archaeological expeditions in the areas that are part of modern-day Yemen and Oman. Excavating primarily in the 1950s, Phillips unearthed artifacts from the ancient kingdom of Sabaʾ. He was famous in the United States for his dashing style and adventurous stories, leading to his nickname, "America's Lawrence of Arabia".

Following his archaeological career, Phillips acquired oil concessions in Oman, Venezuela, South Korea, Indonesia, and other countries, which made him the largest individual holder of oil rights in the world, and gave him a net worth of $120 million.

== Early life and education ==
Phillips was born in Oakland, California in 1921. His mother, Sunshine, was a gold prospector in California. His family was poor, and Phillips worked various jobs as a youth, including serving as a guide on Treasure Island during the San Francisco World's Fair. He suffered from polio as a young man and recovered in his early 20s.

Phillips graduated from the University of California at Berkeley in 1943 with a Bachelor of Arts degree in paleontology. His studies had been interrupted by World War II, in which Phillips served in the Merchant Marine before returning to college. Also during his college years, Phillips participated in fossil-hunting expeditions to Arizona, Oregon, and Utah, and corresponded with archaeologist William F. Albright, who later accompanied Phillips on his first archaeology expedition.

== Archaeology career ==
=== African expedition ===
In the late 1940s, Phillips acquired funding from the University of California to organize a broad archaeological exploration of Africa. Though Phillips was inexperienced as an archaeologist, he used his charisma and persuasion skills to lead a team of approximately 50 scholars and technicians, equipped with trucks and an airplane. The expedition lasted 26 months and covered the entire length of the continent between Egypt and South Africa, receiving significant publicity in the United States. A highlight of the expedition's findings were jaws and teeth of a hominid from the Swartkrans site in South Africa.

=== First Yemen expedition ===
Phillips's next expedition was in 1951 to the Arabian peninsula. Planning for this expedition began with a 1949 meeting between Phillips and Ahmad bin Yahya Hamidaddin, then King of Yemen, who suggested to Phillips that he explore a region of modern-day Yemen. The Imam's recommendation was further reinforced in meetings that Phillips had with Arabist St John Philby and with Charles Inge who was then Director of Antiquities for the Crown Colony of Aden. These conversations culminated in Phillips leading a journey to explore the ancient city of Timna. This region is historically significant because of its role in the incense trade route. As preparation for the Yemeni expedition, Phillips conducted a two-week aerial reconnaissance of the Arabian peninsula.

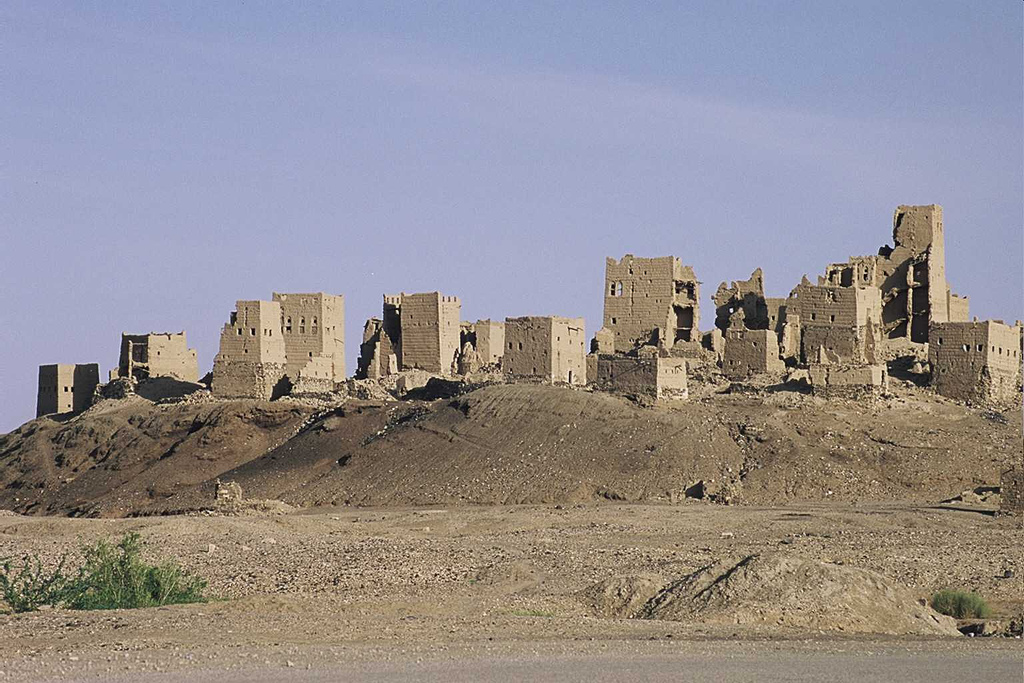
Ancient city of Ma'rib

The expedition to Yemen was smaller and more tightly organized than Phillips's African trip. It included William F. Albright as chief archaeologist. In addition to Timna, the expedition also focused on excavation of Ma'rib, believed to be the capital of the Sabaʾ empire, historically identified with the biblical Queen of Sheba.

At Timna, Phillips's team excavated through layers of strata, allowing them to develop a timeline of the city dating to the 8th century BCE. An excavation at the House Yafash uncovered twin bronze lions and an alabaster figurine referred to by the team as "Miriam". The excavation also uncovered many utilitarian objects from daily life and funerary objects from a cemetery at Timna. One of the excavation sites was the Circular Moon Temple, dating to approximately 800 BCE.

Part of the expedition took place at a pre-Islamic site called Hajar bin Humeid, where excavation reached layers of strata from the 11th century BCE. Also noteworthy from the 1951 endeavors was the discovery of ancient masonry marks on paving stones providing instructions for builders. This find served as a key to the language of the ancient inhabitants. Also included was epigraphist Albert Jamme who contributed significantly to understanding the language and developing the timeline of the ancient people of the region. Jamme compiled his findings in a treatise Sabaean Inscriptions From Mahram Bilqis (Marib), which included a foreword by Phillips.

Excavations included the Marib Dam, which was the largest of ancient times, and the Awwam Temple, which was one of the most important temples of the Sabean people, in use 1,200 years before the emergence of Islam. The team developed a detailed description of the temple, including its size and materials of construction, and determined that the temple was reconstructed at least once during these pre-Islamic times. They discovered many inscriptions within these structures that provided insight into the pre-Islamic religion of the region. The expedition team also found a Hellenistic influence in certain of the statues in the temple.

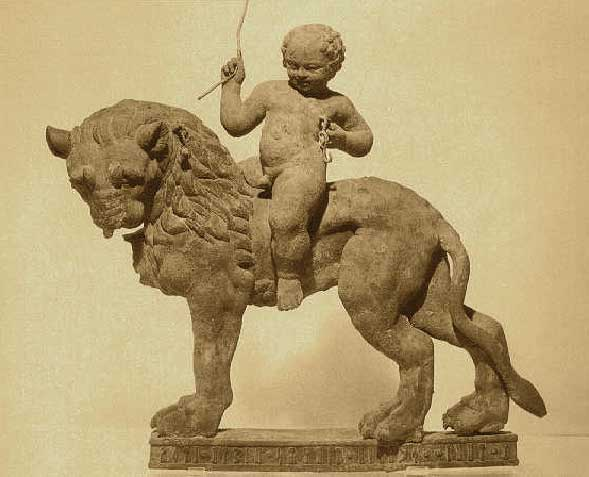
Example of a Qataban bronze lion found in the House Yafash

However, the expedition was interrupted by raids by Bedouin warriors. The size of the project, the taking of artifacts, and the lack of familiarity of the local people with foreigners caused suspicion from locals, with some viewing Phillips's expedition as an invasion. Early in the project, Phillips was briefly taken prisoner by the locals. By early 1952, the hostility was enough to end the project, and the region has remained closed to archaeologists since that time.

=== Other expeditions ===
Phillips's expeditions in the Middle East extended through most of the 1950s and into the early 1960s, emphasizing the Dhofar Province. In 1960, Phillips led another expedition to the region to excavate three locations dating to pre-Islamic times. The expedition yielded more artifacts, inscriptions, and further insight into the pre-Islamic history of the region. One member of the team, Ray L. Cleveland, wrote that "sedentary occupation of any importance came rather late to this region of Arabia."

During the course of his expeditions, Phillips and his teams microfilmed more than two million pages of documented history of the region at St. Catherine's Monastery. As a result of the expedition, Phillips was able to detail a timeline of Arabian history, which is archived at the United States Library of Congress.

=== Public image ===
Phillips was known to be concerned with his public image in the United States and elsewhere. He brought cameras on his expeditions to provide publicity photographs and movies of his exploits. He held international press conferences and sent telegrams to the president of the United States. At times, he carried Colt .45 caliber pistols on his waist and staffed his expeditions on occasion with attractive women. In these ways, Phillips nurtured an exotic and celebrated reputation while maintaining high productivity of his expeditions.

== Oil career ==
During his 1951 expedition to modern-day Yemen, Phillips became acquainted with the Sultan of Oman, who was impressed with his skills as a salesman. The sultan believed Phillips could be useful for exploiting the region's oil reserves and granted Phillips the mineral rights to a modest oil producing region of his country. The sultan also granted him two offshore oil concessions, copper mining rights, and offshore fishing rights, which Phillips began to parlay into his Middle East American Oil Company in 1954. Phillips traded some of his original concessions for more profitable mineral rights in Venezuela, Indonesia, and elsewhere. By 1955, Phillips also completed an arrangement with King Idris of Libya to acquire oil rights in that nation.

By 1975, Phillips was the largest individual holder of oil concessions in the world, with a net worth in 1975 United States dollars of $120 million.

== Personal life ==
External media
- Images of the Wendell Phillips

Images
- Photograph of Phillips wearing a keffiyeh, image from the Biblical Archeological Review

Video
- Video describing one of Phillips's significant expeditions, from the British Broadcasting Company

On September 17, 1968, in Honolulu, the 46-year-old Phillips married 18-year-old Shirley Au, daughter of the supervisor of Pearl Harbor Naval Shipyard. The marriage ended in divorce three months later.

Phillips died of heart disease at a hospital in Arlington, Virginia, on December 4, 1975. In his last years, he lived in a penthouse apartment in Waikiki, Hawaii, from which he managed his oil enterprises.

== Writings ==
Phillips authored several books. Qataban and Sheba: Exploring the Ancient Kingdoms on the Biblical Spice Routes of Arabia, was named to the American Library Association's list of 50 Best Books of 1955. In 1958, Phillips published an autobiography, Sheba's Buried City (Qataban and Sheba), in which he credits his mother for instilling his interest in exploration. Unknown Oman is an account of his 1958 expedition to Oman.

== Legacy ==
As of 2015, Phillips was the only United States citizen ever to be named a Bedouin sheikh of the Bal-Harith tribe. He was a member of the Dutch Treat Club, and fellow member Lowell Thomas gave Phillips his nickname of "America's Lawrence of Arabia", after illustrious British adventurer T. E. Lawrence. He was a 1972 Golden Plate Awardee of the Academy of Achievement. Phillips is considered to be a real-life model for the fictional film character Indiana Jones.

Phillips's sister Merilyn Phillips Hodgson manages his collection of archaeological artifacts through the American Foundation for the Study of Man. In 1998, by invitation of the Yemen government, the American Foundation for the Study of Man returned to Yemen for archaeological purposes, this time under the leadership of Hodgson.

The Arthur M. Sackler Gallery of the Smithsonian Institution displayed artifacts from Phillips's expeditions and details of his life in an exhibition that ran from 2014 to 2015. The Sackler Gallery described the exhibit as being the first "multi-sensory" exhibition in that it included artifacts, films clips and videos, field notebooks, and vintage photographs.

Phillips's flamboyant style and methods sometimes resulted in controversy. One scholar, Carl Lamberg-Karlovsky, described Phillips's excavations as "looting". Members of Phillips's own teams at times complained about his emphasis on style. In contrast, Sackler Gallery scholar Julian Raby described Phillips as an example of "entrepreneurial archaeology", being typical of the era in which Phillips was active. This characteristic, together with his organizational skills and fund-raising skills, were aspects of his expeditions that resulted in significant findings of enduring value.

The main building of the College of the Pacific at the University of the Pacific is named the Wendell Phillips Center.
