= Almaqah =

Sabaean deity

Almaqah or Almuqh (Sabaean: 𐩱𐩡𐩣𐩤𐩠; Arabic: المقه) was national deity of the Sabaeans of the pre-Islamic Yemeni kingdom of Saba', representing the Moon or Sun god. He was also worshipped in Dʿmt and Aksum in Ethiopia and Eritrea. The main center for his worship was at the Awwam Temple, which remained in use until the fourth century AD.

== Characteristics ==
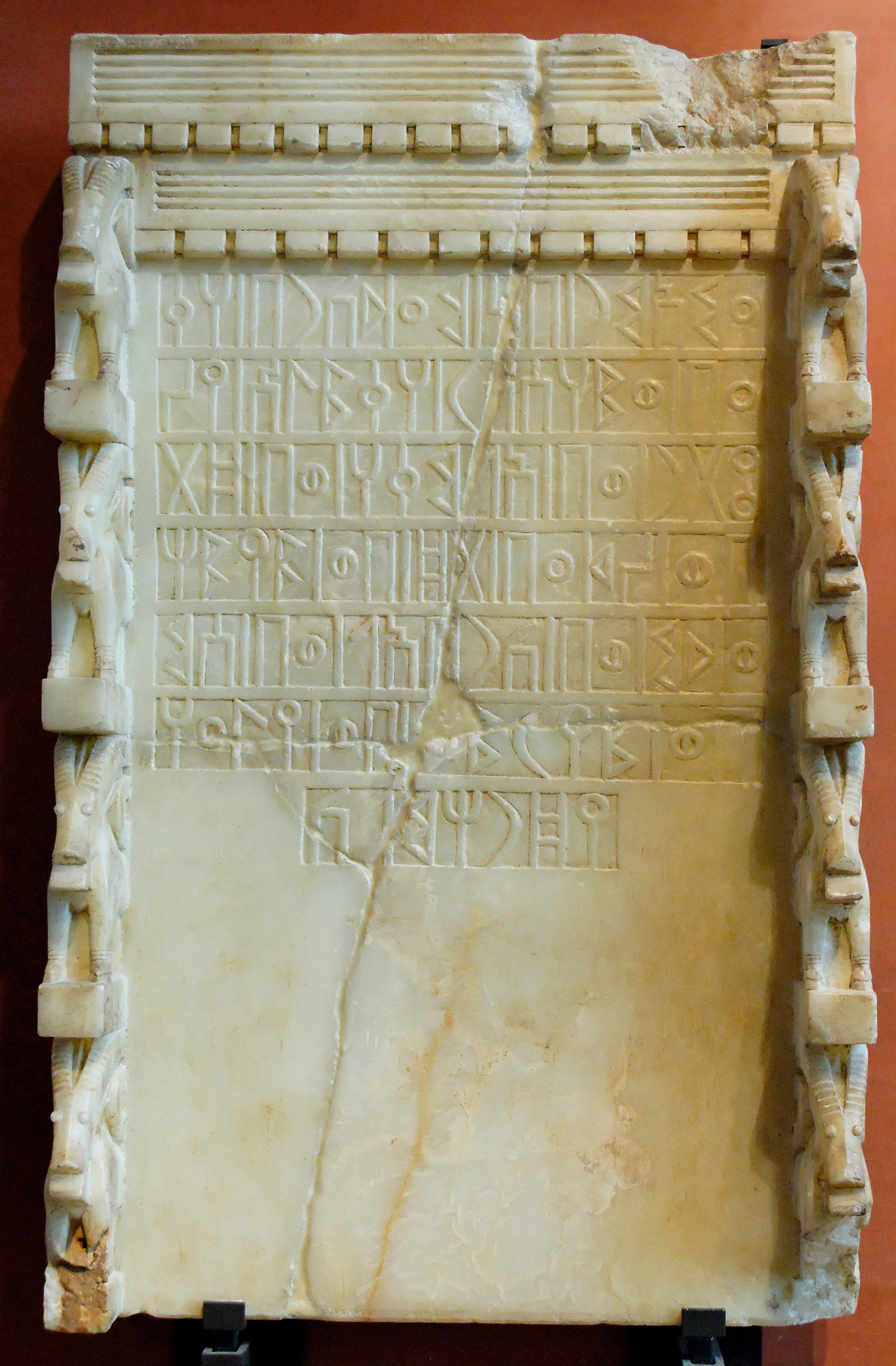
Sabaean inscription addressed to the god Almaqah, mentioning five ancient Yemeni gods, two reigning sovereigns and two governors, 7th century BCE

Jacques Ryckmans states,

Almaqah is considered a moon god, but Garbini and Pirenne have shown that the bull's head and the vine motif associated with him may have solar and dionysiac attributes. He was therefore a priest of Ra, the male counterpart of the sun goddess Shamash / Ishtar / Isis, who was also venerated in Saba, but as a tutelary goddess of the royal Egyptian dynasty.

The ruling dynasty of Saba' regarded themselves as his seed. Almaqah is represented on monuments by a cluster of lightning bolts surrounding a curved, sickle-like weapon. Bulls were sacred to him.

== Temples ==
Marib, the capital of the Kingdom of Saba, had three important temples dedicated to Almaqah: the Temple of Awwam and the Bar'an Temple in the southern oasis, and the Harwanum Temple in the north. The Awwam Temple was the main oracular seat for Almaqah, and this was the case as early as the 7th century BC, although most inscriptions discovered at the site (amounting to several hundred) are from the first three Christian centuries. At inscriptions known from the Awwam Temple, Almaqah is given the epithet "Ṯahwān, Lord of Awām". The Awwam Temple was also an important site of pilgrimage across South Arabia during the month of ḏū-Abhī. Beyond Marib, another important temple for Almaqah is the oval temple of Sirwah, another important urban city from the Sabaean kingdom. Here, "Lord of the ibexes". Additional sites of devotion are known from the Yemeni highlands, including an important one from the Alāw mountain, the center of the worship of several tribes and perhaps a secondary branch of the main Awwam Temple.

The Temple of Meqaber Gaʿewa near the Ethiopian city of Wuqro, is dedicated to Almaqah and contains an altar which represents a miniature model of the Great Temple in Yeha.

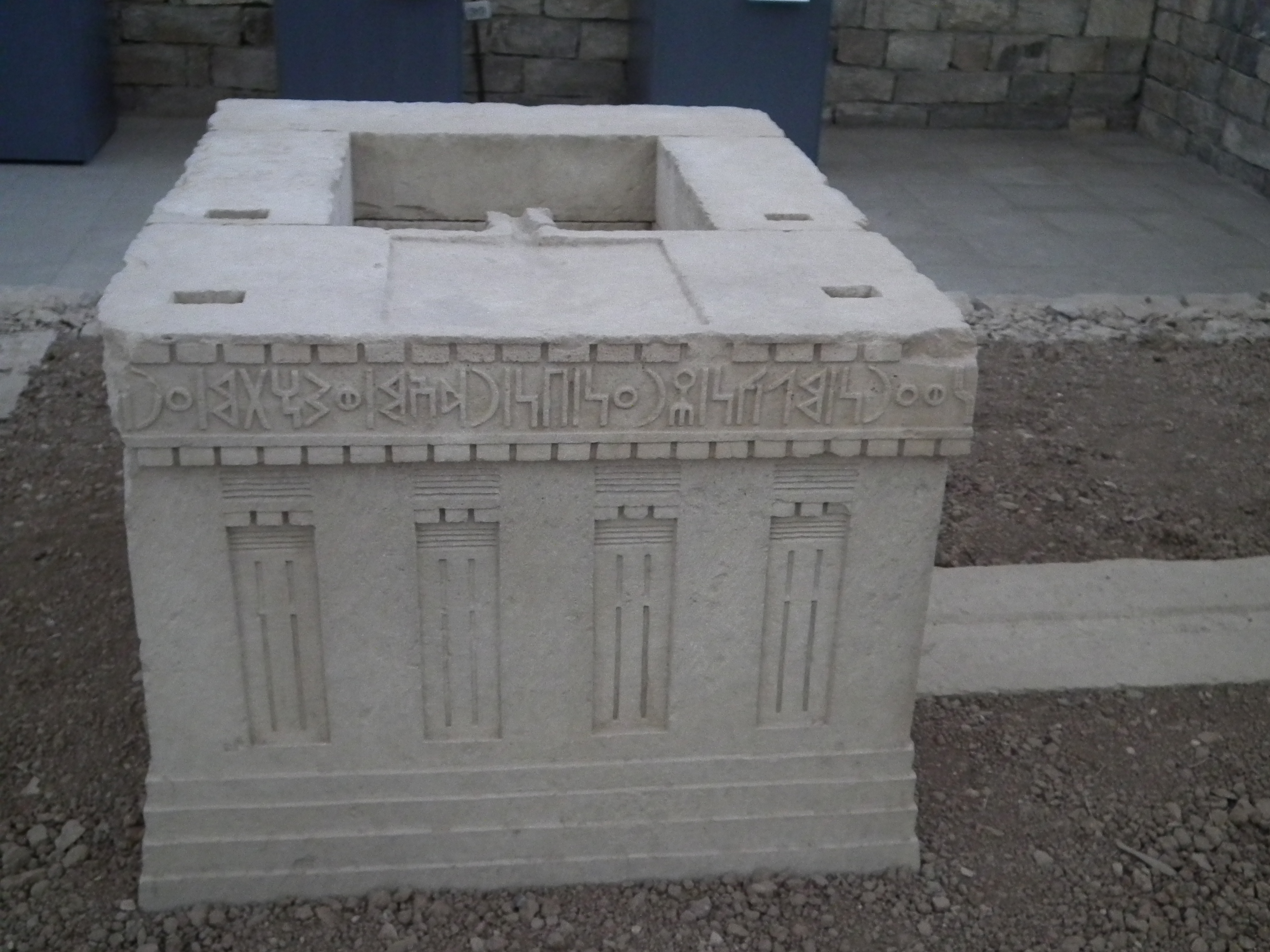
Altar at Almaqah Temple of Meqaber Gaʿewa in Wukro, Ethiopia

== See also ==
- Ancient history of Yemen

== Sources ==
- Agostini, Alessio (2023). "The masʾal oracle: a survey of an ancient South Arabian divinatory practice". Semitica et Classica. 16: 139–155.
- Maraqten, Mohammed (2021). "Historiography of Pre-Islamic Arabia: Arab Scholars and Their Contributions to the Writing of the History of Ancient Yemen". In Baadj, Amar (ed.). A Handbook of Modern Arabic Historical Scholarship on the Ancient and Medieval Periods. Brill. pp. 100–137.
