= Jacqueline Pirenne =

French archaeologist (1918–1990)

Jacqueline Pirenne (1918 – 8 November 1990) was a French archaeologist and epigrapher, who studied ancient South Arabia and Ethiopia.

== Life ==
Born in Neuilly-sur-Seine, the granddaughter of the Belgian historian Henri Pirenne through her father Jacques Pirenne, Jacqueline Pirenne attended the Lycée Molière in Paris (16th arrondissement) and completed an undergraduate degree in philosophy at the Sorbonne in 1939. Following World War II, she undertook further study in philology and oriental history at the Catholic University of Leuven, where she completed her doctoral thesis in 1954.

Her research focussed on South Arabia (Yemen), especially ancient Sheba and Qataban, and the Semitic languages of the Arabian Peninsula. Her doctoral thesis, supervised by Gonzague Ryckmans and René Dussaud, employed comparisons between Greek and South Arabian art to propose a 'short chronology' of the ancient South Arabian kingdoms, which placed the origin of these kingdoms in the 5th century BC – substantially later than had previously been believed. She continued to argue for this chronology in subsequent work, making use of palaeographic evidence for changing letter-forms in inscriptions, such as those of Al-Masajid. This work culminated in the publication of Le royaume sud-arabe de Quataban in 1961.

From 1957 to 1985, she worked at the Centre national de la recherche scientifique (CNRS), eventually rising to the position of Director of Research. From 1960 to 1971, Pirenne produced a number of studies of South Arabian sculpture and architectural elements. From 1974 until 1986, she directed the excavation of Shabwa, capital of ancient Hadhramaut. The first volume of excavation reports, containing the inscriptions found on the site, was published by Pirenne in 1990. With the assistance of André Dupont-Sommer, she produced the Corpus des Inscriptions et Antiquités sud-arabes, a major collection of South Arabian inscriptions, which was published in seven volumes between 1977 and 1986.

After leaving the CNRS in 1985, Pirenne spent two years in Addis Abeba, working on the chronology of the kings of Aksum and helping to support Ethiopian orphans. Her work in this area was continued by one of her pupils, Gigar Tesfaye.

She returned to France in 1987 to took up a chair of Sabaean studies at the University of Strasbourg. She was killed in a car accident in Strasbourg in 1990.

== Selected works ==
- 1955/57. Paleographie des inscriptions sud-arabes (Palaeography of the South Arabian Inscriptions). Presses de la Academie, Brüssel.
- 1958 À la découverte de l'Arabie. Cinq siècles de science et d'aventure (On the Discovery of Arabia: Five centuries of scholarship and adventure). Paris.
- 1960. "La Grèce et Saba. Une nouvelle base par le chronologie sud-arabe" (Greece and Sheba: A new basis for South Arabian chronology). In: Mémoires présentés par divers savants à l'Académie des Inscriptions et Belles-Lettres 15 pp. 89–196.
- 1961. Le royaume sud-arabe de Quataban et sa datation d'apres l'archeologie et les sourches classiques jusqu'au Periple de la Mer erithree (The South Arabian Kingdom of Qataban and its chronology on the basis of archaeology and the classical sources up to the Periplus of the Erythraean Sea. Publication universitaires, Louvain.
- 1963. Aux Origines de la graphie syriaque (On the Origins of Syriac writing. Geuthner, Paris.
- 1977–1986. Corpus des Inscriptions et Antiquités sud-arabes (Corpus of South Arabian Inscriptions and Antiquities) Académie des inscriptions et belles-lettres
- 1990. Fouilles de Shabwa I, Les témoins écrits de la région de Shabwa et l'Histoire (Excavations at Shabwa I: The written sources of the region of Shabwa and its history), BAH 134.

== Bibliography ==
- Lanfranco Ricci, "Jacqueline Pirenne." Rassegna di Studi Etiopici 33 (1989), p. 163
- Ernest Will: "Jacqueline Pirenne (1918-1990)." Syria. Archéologie, art et histoire 68 (1991), pp. 465–466, ISSN 0768-2506 (Full text).
