= Shaharah Bridge =

Shahara Bridge جسر شهارة
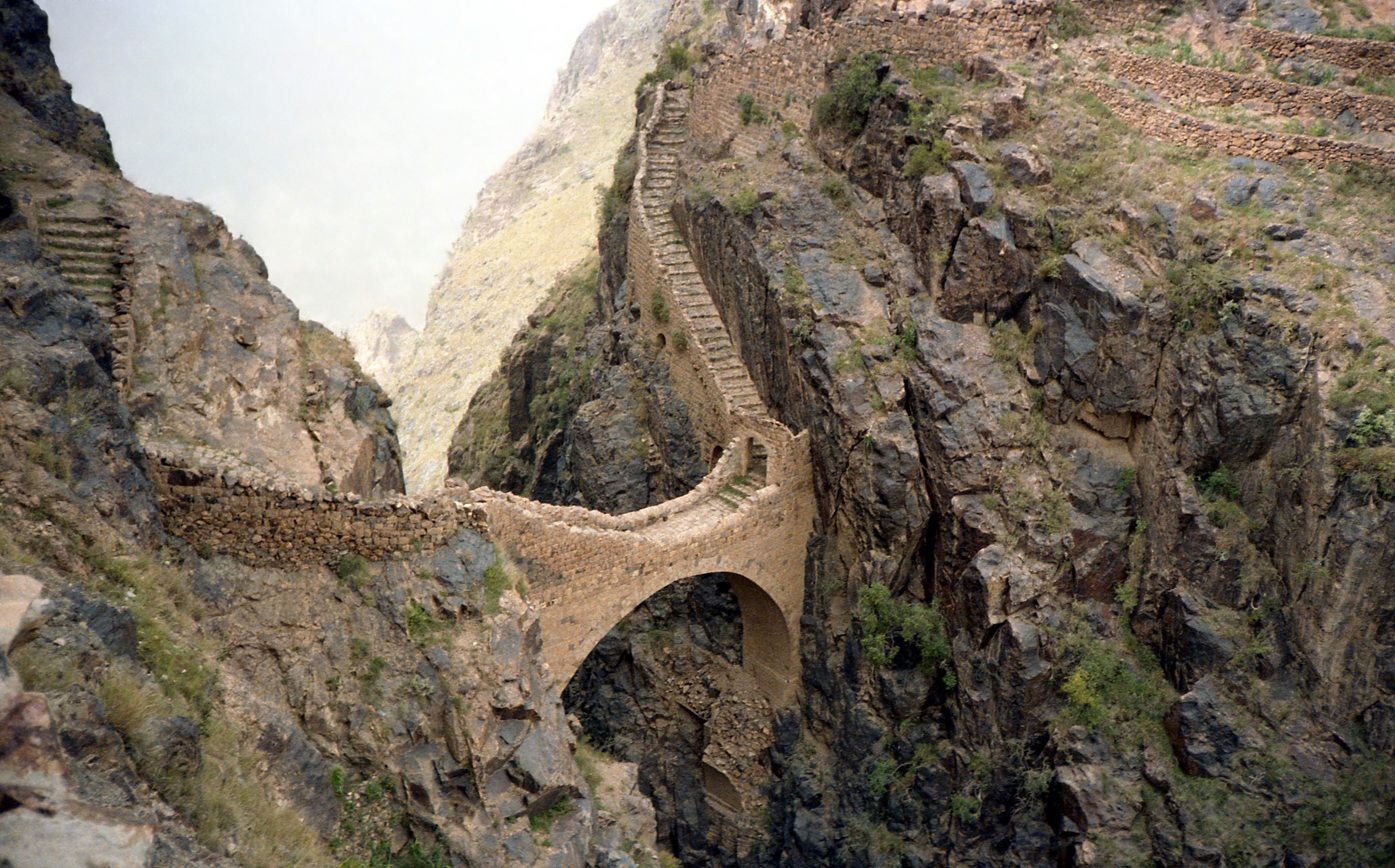
- Coordinates: 16.1648°N 43.6973°E
- Locale: Shaharah District, Amran Governorate

Characteristics
- Total length: 65 ft (20 m)
- Width: 9 feet ( 3 m)
- Water depth: 300 ft (91 m)

History
- Built: 1905

Shaharah Bridge (Arabic: جسر شهارة) is an arch bridge in Yemen. It was constructed in the 17th century by Usta Saleh Al-Soudi to connect two villages at the top of two mountains (Jebel Al-Emir and Jebel Faish) in Shaharah District, Amran Governorate, northern Yemen. Shaharah Bridge is a stone arch bridge and crosses a canyon 300 feet (91 m) deep; it is 65 feet (20 m) long, and 9 feet (2.7 m) wide, and is situated at an altitude of 2,600 metres (8,500 ft). The bridge is the only path to Shaharah, some 2 kilometres (1.2 mi) away as the crow flies, the town it is named after. It is one of the most famous bridges and tourist attractions in Yemen.

== See also ==
- Shaharah
- Geography of Yemen
- List of wadis of Yemen
