= Marib Dam =

Dam and archaeological site in Yemen

- سد مأرب (Arabic)
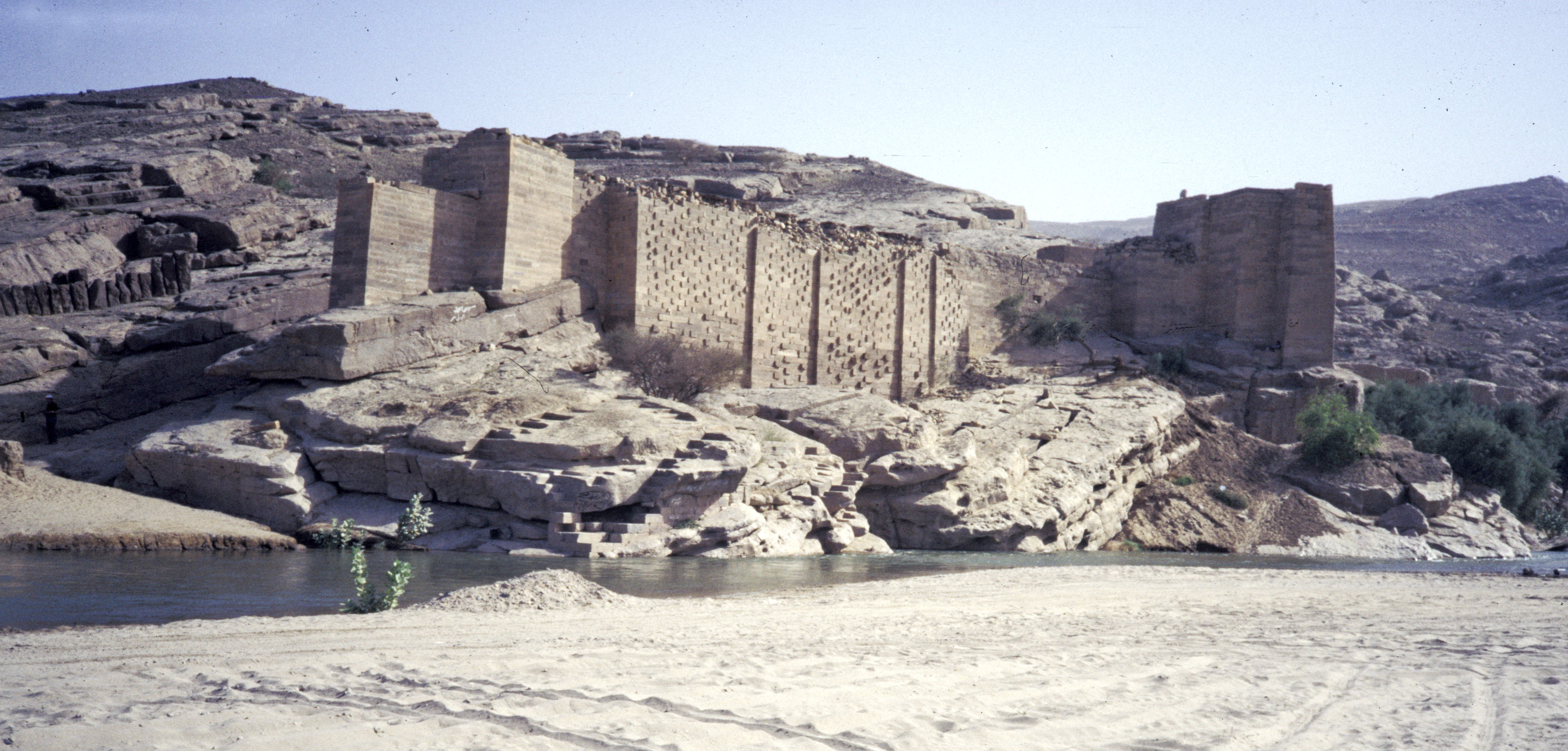
- Ruins of the Great Dam of Marib in 1988
- Interactive map of Marib Dam
- 15°23′47″N 45°14′37″E
- Periods: Ancient Yemen
- Location: Marib Governorate, Yemen
- Region: Southern Arabia

History
- Built: 1750BC–1700BC

UNESCO World Heritage Site
- Part of: Landmarks of the Ancient Kingdom of Saba, Marib
- Criteria: Cultural: (iii), (iv)
- Reference: 1700
- Inscription: 2023 (45th Session)
- Endangered: 2023–

The Marib Dam (Arabic: سَدّ مَأْرِب Sadd Ma'rib, or سُدّ مَأْرِب Sudd Ma'rib) is a dam blocking wadi Adhanah (أَذَنَة, also Dhanah ذَنَة) in the Balaq Hills, located in the Ma'rib Governorate in Yemen. The current dam was built in the 1980s and is close to the ruins of the ancient dam, first built in the 8th century BC. It was one of the engineering wonders of the ancient world and a central part of the Sabaean and Himyarite kingdoms around Ma'rib.

The Marib Dam is an important site in the study of the archaeology of the Arabian Peninsula. In 2023, along with other landmarks of the ancient Kingdom of Saba, three locations across the Marib Dam were added to the UNESCO World Heritage List.

== Ancient dam ==
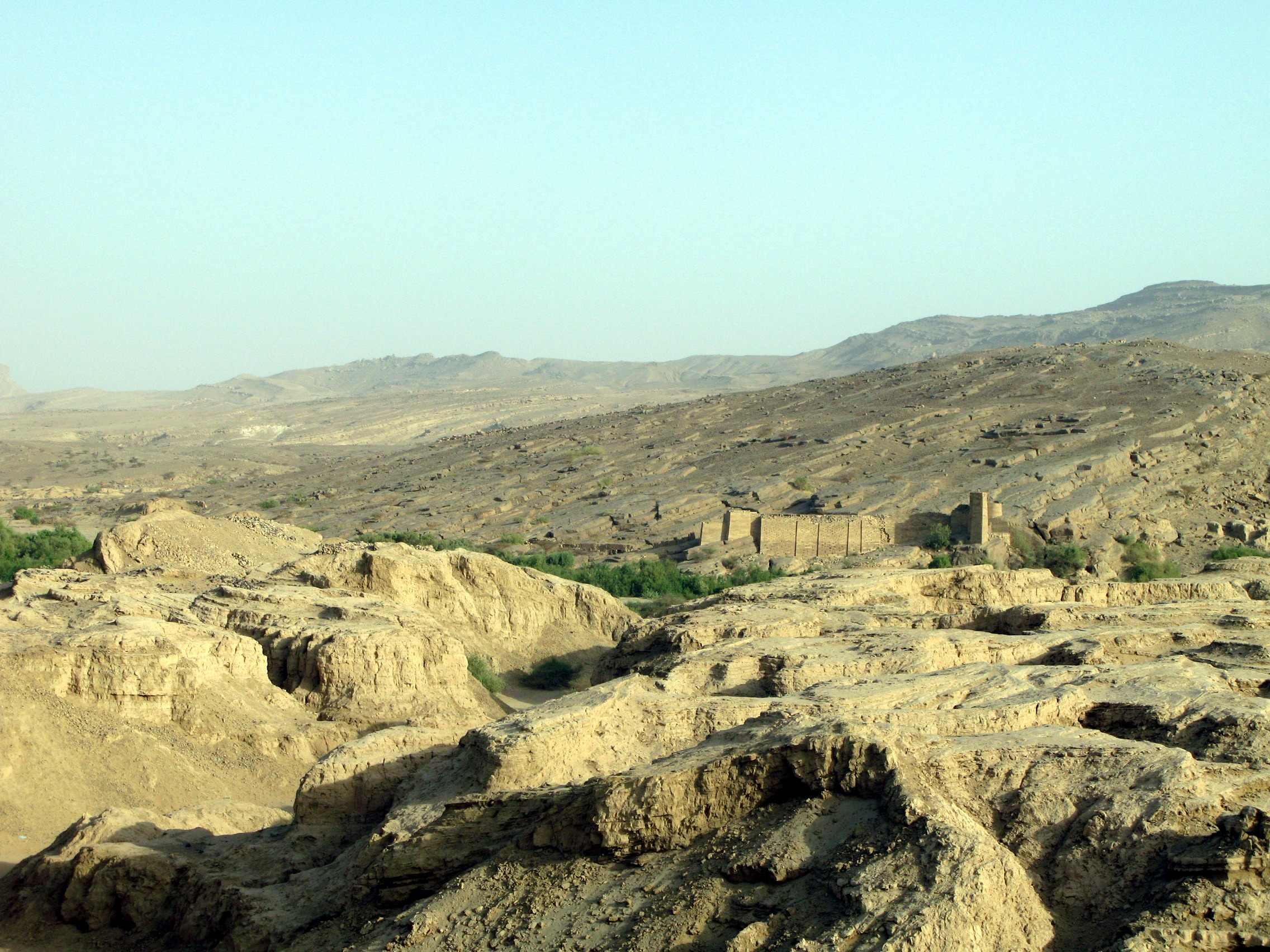
Remains of the dam

The site of the great Dam of Marib, also called the Dam of 'Arim (Arabic: سَدّ ٱلْعَرِم, sadd al-ˁArim), is upstream (south-west) of the ancient city of Maʾrib, once the capital of the ancient kingdom of Sheba. The Kingdom of Sabaʾ was a prosperous trading nation, with control of the frankincense and spice routes in Arabia and Abyssinia. The Sabaeans built the dam to capture the periodic monsoon rains which fall on the nearby mountains and so irrigate the land around the city. Some tentative archaeological findings suggest that simple earth dams and a canal network were constructed as far back as around 1750 BC, but the most reliable information dates the Great Dam of Marib to about the 8th century BC. It is counted by some as one of the most impressive feats of engineering in the ancient world.

The medieval Arab geographer Yāqūt al-Ḥamawī describes it thus:

It is between three mountains, and the flood waters all flow to the one location, and because of that the water only discharges in one direction; and the ancients blocked that place with hard rocks and lead. The water from springs gathers there as well as floodwater, collecting behind the dam like a sea. Whenever they wanted to they could irrigate their crops from it, by just letting out however much water they needed from sluice gates; once they had used enough they would close the gates again as they pleased.

=== Construction ===
Depiction of the dam on the Escutcheon of the Emblem of Yemen

The date of the first construction of a dam at Ma'rib goes back to somewhere between 1750 and 1700 BC. The earliest inscription on the dam is one placed there at the time of its construction or repair of parts of the dam undertaken by Yatha' Amar Watar I, son of Yada' El Zarih I, who reigned in 760–740 BC. The following repair was in the time of Yada' El Bayin II who reigned in 740–720 BC. Renovations were then carried out by Dhamar El Zarih I and Karab El Bayin who reigned in 700–680 BC. All repairs were minor, consisting of essential maintenance, such as removing dirt, opening water courses, or stopping up gaps. The Makrib Samah' El Yanuf II, son of Dhamar El Watar II, had his name carved into parts of the dam to mark the completion and repair of the dam.

The dam was composed of packed earth, triangular in cross section, 580 m (1,900 ft) in length and 4 metres (13 feet) high. It ran between two groups of rocks on either side of the river and was linked to the rock with substantial stonework. The dam's position allowed for a spillway and sluices between the northern end of the dam and the cliffs to the west. Around 500 BC, its height was increased to 7 metres (23 ft), the upstream slope (the water face) was reinforced with a cover of stones, and irrigation was extended to include the southern side as well as the northern side.

After the end of the Kingdom of Sabaʾ, the dam fell under the control of the Himyarites around 115 BC. They undertook further reconstruction, creating a structure 14 metres (46 ft) high, with extensive waterworks at both the northern and southern ends, five spillway channels, two masonry-reinforced sluices, a settling pond, and a 1,000 m (3,300 ft) canal to a distribution tank. These extensive works were not actually finalized until 325 AD, and they allowed the irrigation of 100 km^{2} (25,000 acres).

=== Maintenance ===
The Muslim historian al-Isfahani (whose Annals were completed in 961 AD) maintains that a dam breach occurred some 400 years before the rise of Islam, but Yāqūt al-Ḥamawī assigns it to the time of Abyssinian rule.

Ancient South Arabian sources report that in about 145 BC, the dam suffered a major breach during the war between the people of Raydān and the Kingdom of Sabaʾ, and that is the very breach that many scholars consider to have caused the Sayl al-ˁArim (Arabic: سَيْل ٱلْعَرِم, Flood of the ‘Arim) mentioned in the Quran; it is also mentioned in Arab proverbs which speak about the hands of Sabaʾ having separated at that time. The fighting between the Raydānites and the Sabaeans delayed the repair of the dam, and this caused devastating losses of crops and fruit, leading large numbers of people to disperse in search of new land capable of supporting life, so huge migrations ensued. It is still uncertain though whether it was that particular breach that caused the "flood of ˁArim" or not, since some migrations certainly took place in the 2nd or 3rd centuries AD, and they are also ascribed to the breaking of the Dam of Maʾrib. The dam was repaired twice shortly before the coming of Islam, once by Sharḥabīl Yaˁfar bin Abī Karab Yasˁad in 450, and by Abrahah in 543. The inscriptions on the dam explain the costs of repair and the large number of workers involved.

The archaeology of the Ma'rib Dam shows the effects of siltation behind dams in antiquity, and measures to extend the operational life of the reservoir. The same problems of siltation encountered in the ancient dam were also faced in the construction of the new dam. Despite the increases in height, the dam suffered numerous breaches (recorded major incidents occurred in 449, 450, 542, and 548) and the maintenance work became increasingly onerous; the last recorded repairs took place in 557.

=== Final breach ===
Locals report that the final breach of the dam had been predicted by a king called ʿImrān, who was also a soothsayer, and later by the wife of the king. According to legend, the breach was caused by large rats gnawing at it with their teeth and scratching it with their nails. In 570 or 575, the dam was again overtopped, and this time left unrepaired. The final destruction of the Dam of Maʾrib is alluded to in the Quran (34: 15–17):

لَقَدْ كَانَ لِسَبَإٍ فِي مَسْكَنِهِمْ آيَةٌ ۖ جَنَّتَانِ عَن يَمِينٍ وَشِمَالٍ ۖ كُلُوا مِن رِّزْقِ رَبِّكُمْ وَاشْكُرُوا لَهُ ۚ بَلْدَةٌ طَيِّبَةٌ وَرَبٌّ غَفُورٌ، فَأَعْرَضُوا فَأَرْسَلْنَا عَلَيْهِمْ سَيْلَ الْعَرِمِ وَبَدَّلْنَاهُم بِجَنَّتَيْهِمْ جَنَّتَيْنِ ذَوَاتَيْ أُكُلٍ خَمْطٍ وَأَثْلٍ وَشَيْءٍ مِّن سِدْرٍ قَلِيلٍ

"There was for [the tribe of] Sabaʾ in their dwelling place a sign: two [fields of] gardens on the right and on the left. [They were told], "Eat from the provisions of your Lord and be grateful to Him. A good land [have you], and a forgiving Lord. But they turned away [refusing], so We sent upon them the flood of the dam, and We replaced their two [fields of] gardens with gardens of bitter fruit, tamarisks and something of sparse lote trees."

The consequent failure of the irrigation system provoked the migration of up to 50,000 people from Yemen to other areas of the Arabian Peninsula, and even to the Levant.

== Modern dam ==
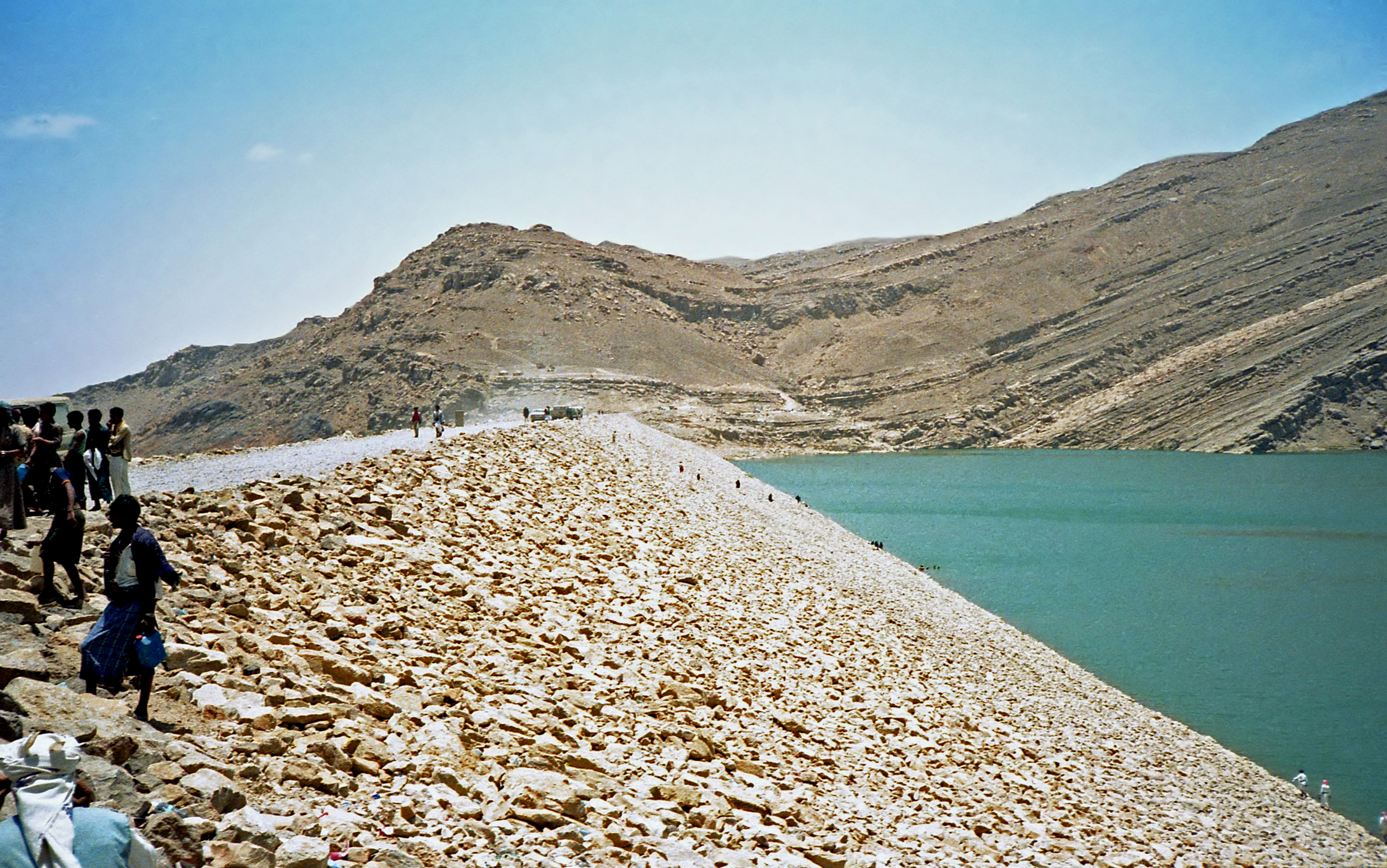
The current dam in 1986

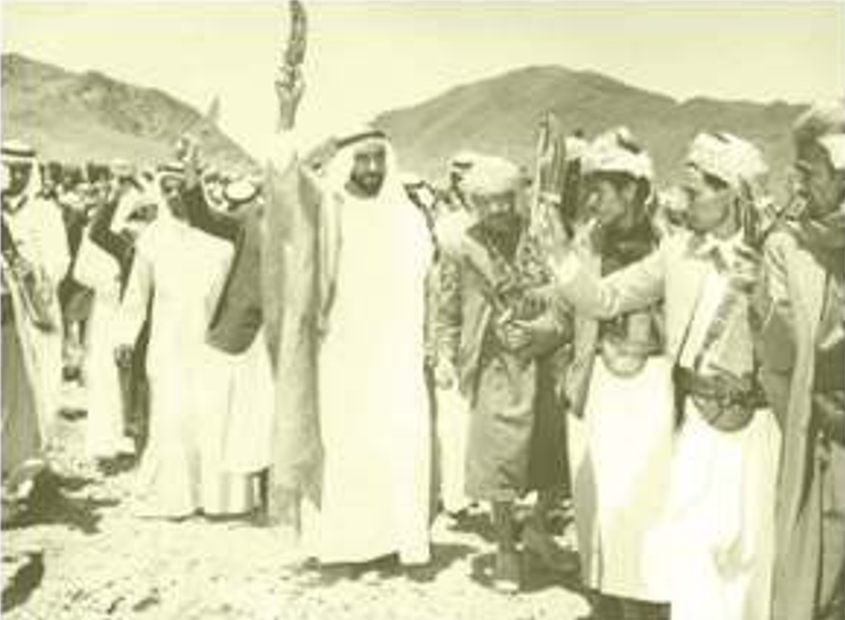
Sheikh Zayed dancing the traditional dance "Bara'a" with a Jambiya along with Yemeni locals in Marib after the reopening of the Marib Dam.

A dam was built in the 1980s by Doğuş Group, close to the location of the old one, at the expense of Sheikh Zayed bin Sultan Al Nahyan, whose tribe reportedly resettled from Ma'rib to his country, sometime during the 17th century, or in the 6th century, after the collapse of the historical dam. The opening ceremony took place on 20 December 1986, in the presence of Zayed and Ayhan Şahenk of Doğuş Group. The dam was considered by people inside and outside Yemen to have a positive effect on the agriculture and economy of the region of Ma'rib, and the country in general.

The dam is 38 m (125 ft) high, 763 m (2,503 ft) long, built of earth across the Wadi Dhana at 15°23′47″N 45°14′37″E, creating a storage capacity of 398 million cubic meters. The dam site is located 3 km (1.9 miles) upstream of the ruins of the Great Dam. The new dam, like the old, was designed to store water for irrigating the Ma'rib plains. However, the wadi bed at the new dam site consists of alluvial sand and gravel material 30–50 m (98–164 ft) thick. Seepage that emanates from this dam does not threaten its structure but results in the loss of water. As a way of capturing the seepage, consideration is being given to rebuilding the ancient Ma'rib dam, both as a functioning structure and as a historic monument and tourist attraction. The complexity and volume of work involved in this project make it necessary that several organizations work together under the aegis of UNESCO, using financial contributions from international organizations.

The dam was damaged in an airstrike in 2015. Yemeni officials said that Saudi Arabian coalition forces were responsible for the airstrike.

== See also ==
- Jawa Dam (Jordan), also an archaeological site

== Bibliography ==
- M. C. A. Macdonald, Wabar, in: Jack Sasson, M. (ed.), Civilization of the Ancient Near East 8, London, 1995, 1351.
- Alessandro de Maigret. Arabia Felix, translated Rebecca Thompson. London: Stacey International, 2002. ISBN 1-900988-07-0
- Andrey Korotayev. Ancient Yemen. Oxford: Oxford University Press, 1995. ISBN 0-19-922237-1.
- Hadden, Robert Lee. 2012. The Geology of Yemen: An Annotated Bibliography of Yemen's Geology, Geography and Earth Science. Alexandria, VA: US Army Corps of Engineers, Army Geospatial Center.
