= Temple of Awwam =

Archaeological site in Yemen

- معبد أوام (Arabic)
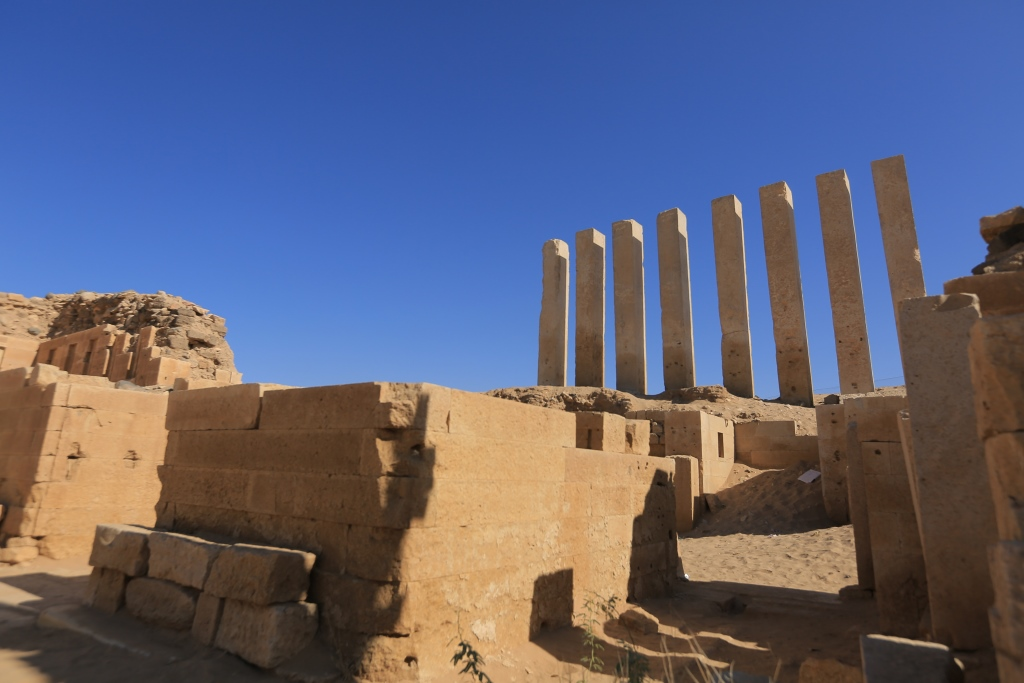
- Mahram Bilqis or Awam Temple in 2017 in Marib, Yemen

- Location within Yemen
- 15.4042°N 45.3557°E
- Periods: Ancient Yemen
- Satellite of: Almaqah
- Location: Awwam, Marib Governorate, Yemen

History
- Built: 1500–1200 BCE
- Built by: Sabaeans

UNESCO World Heritage Site
- Part of: Landmarks of the Ancient Kingdom of Saba, Marib
- Criteria: Cultural: (iii), (iv)
- Reference: 1700
- Inscription: 2023 (45th Session)
- Endangered: 2023–...

The Temple of Awwam (Arabic: معبد أوام, Sabaean: 𐩱𐩥𐩣), commonly known as Mahram Bilqis (Arabic: محرم بلقيس, romanized: Maḥram Bilqīs, lit. 'Sanctuary of Bilqīs') by locals, was the main Sabaean temple dedicated to their national god, Almaqah (frequently called "Lord of ʾAwwām"), and it is also the largest known temple complex in South Arabia, located near Marib in what is now Yemen. The temple is situated 7 kilometres (4.3 mi) southeast of ancient Marib, and was built on the outskirts of the city. Although usually major Sabaean sanctuaries are located outside urban centers, its placement was probably for reasons of religious privacy and to facilitate the conduct of rituals by arriving pilgrims from remote areas of Sabaean territories. Nearly a thousand inscriptions have been discovered from the Temple, comprising the single most important collection of pre-Islamic Arabian inscriptions that provides the foundation for reconstructing an outline of the political history of Yemen in its first three centuries of the Common Era.

The temple was in operation from the beginning of the 1st millennium BC until the 4th century AD. Pilgrim rites began at the Harunum Temple, before moving to the Awwam Temple through a processional road connecting the two temples.

The Temple of Awwam is one of the most important sites in the study of the archaeology of the Arabian Peninsula. In 2023, along with other landmarks of the ancient Kingdom of Saba, Awam Temple was added to the UNESCO World Heritage List.

== Pilgrimage ==
The Awwam Temple was the most important site of pilgrimage in pre-Islamic Yemen, centered around the god Almaqah. The communal pilgrimage may have lasted between eight and ten days and it took place in the month of Dhu-Abhay (corresponding to February/March), the same month that Muhammad's Farewell Pilgrimage occurred in. Alongside the annual and communal pilgrimage, pilgrims could also conduct an ordinary visit to the Temple at any time of the year. These two rites have been compared to the Islamic Hajj and Umrah respectively.

The Awwam Temple, like other pre-Islamic Yemeni temples was also associated with a sacred space known as a ḥaram or maḥram (“precinct, protected area, sacred household”). The temple was called bayt ("house, resident"). Some inscriptions call the Awwam Temple the byt ʾlmqh, "House of Almaqah". This is comparable to how the Kaaba is called al-Bayt al-Ḥarām, "the sacred house" in the Quran (5:2).

The pilgrimage rite to the Awwam Temple was considered obligatory in the Kingdom of Saba, to the point that the statue of the god Ta'lab of the Sum'ay tribe, the focus of another major Sabaean pilgrimage, directed its visitors to also perform the Awwam pilgrimage. The ceremonial procession appears to have begun at Ḥarūnum Temple before making its way to Awwam through a processional road that connected the two temples. The main entry site into the Awwam Temple for worshipers was through the west side of the complex and was controlled by a set of gates. Many inscriptions composed by worshipers and participants of the pilgrimage have been found, where Almaqah is thanked for allowing successful childbirth, or prayers are made for the birth of a son, or requests are made for protection from bad luck, harm, mischief, and more. The authors of these texts included both men and women. It appears that the management and feeding of pilgrims was managed by several personnel, including administrators and priests. Personnel were also involved in ensuring the safety of the pilgrims on the roads to the site.

A number of policies appear to have been put into place in order to maintain the sanctity and purity of the Awwam Temple during pilgrimage. One was a ban on bringing animals into the temple, and any violations of this rule would have been met with fines that had to be paid to the king. Texts indicate that a requirement for pilgrims was that they be in a state of ritual purity upon entrance of sacred sites (and fines were also distributed for violating these). Achieving a state of purity was a multi-step process, facilitated by several rooms in the temple, including ritual washings (ablutions). Other Sabaic inscriptions offer information about how ritual purity was understood in Saba: certain foods had to be avoided, sexual intercourse had to be avoided for a few days, weapons (and related behavior) could not be carried, and so on. More detailed rules and regulations are known from other pilgrimage rituals in the Sabaean kingdom, especially the statue of the god Ta'lub in Marib, which might indirectly offer a better understanding for pilgrimage rites and rituals at Awwam.

Recent discoveries suggest that a Maʿlaṣ festival was included among the ceremonies of the pilgrimage. Little about it is known, but the festival may be related to fertility or harvest, and not performing it was considered an offence.

A few temple hymns have been found, most importantly in the inscription Zaid Inan 11. One site at the complex was reserved for animal sacrifice, and sacrifices to Almaqah were performed on the seventh of the month of Dhu-Abhay (potentially analogous to the Islamic rites of ʿīd al-aḍḥā and ayyām at-tashrīq). Several dozen inscriptions describe the role of the Awwan Temple as an oracle temple. Spaces were reserved with communication with the oracle including a shrine inside the Sacred Sanctuary Precinct. Rooms were also present in this shrine for pilgrims to sleep where they would receive dreams sent by the oracle (a practice widely attested in the Near East that is called incubation). The oracle represented the manifestation of the god Almaqah. Circumambulation may have taken place, but no concrete evidence exists for this as of yet.

== General plan of Awwam temple ==
The temple is situated in isolated site functioning mainly as religious sacred area. The place-name, 'wm (place of refuge), signify that sacredness attached to the sanctuary. There is a possibility that the temple developed from a small shrine into an enormous complex encompassing multiple structures associated with the temple i.e. houses for priests, auxiliary rooms, workshops for metalworkers, cemetery connected to the sanctuary, and a residential area which form the so-called protected enclave. Geomorphological investigations have shown that the Awwam temple was erected on high natural platform, making it even more impressive for the viewers. Access to the complex was controlled by doors leading to hierarchical series of courtyards and halls that served as transitional areas.

The temple itself was oriented towards the rising sun (north-east) and consisted of eight pillars propylaeum marking the entrance, followed by large rectangular peristyle hall, and massive oval shaped enclosure with other exterior linked structures (nearby cemetery). Pillars are the most widespread architectural feature used in ancient South Arabian religious structures. The peristyle hall might have reflected the numbers of the 8 pillared propylaeum; There are 32 pillars (4 × 8) inside the peristyle hall, and 64 recessed false windows (8 × 8).

Statues of bronze bulls, horses, and humans used to be attached to the entrance gates of the temple. Many aspects of the decoration, geometrical and figural paintings, sculptures, large and precisely dressed stones, finely carved inscriptions painted red, and beautiful ornamental friezes on the wall's exterior, were meant to impress visitors and fill them with awe in the presence of god.

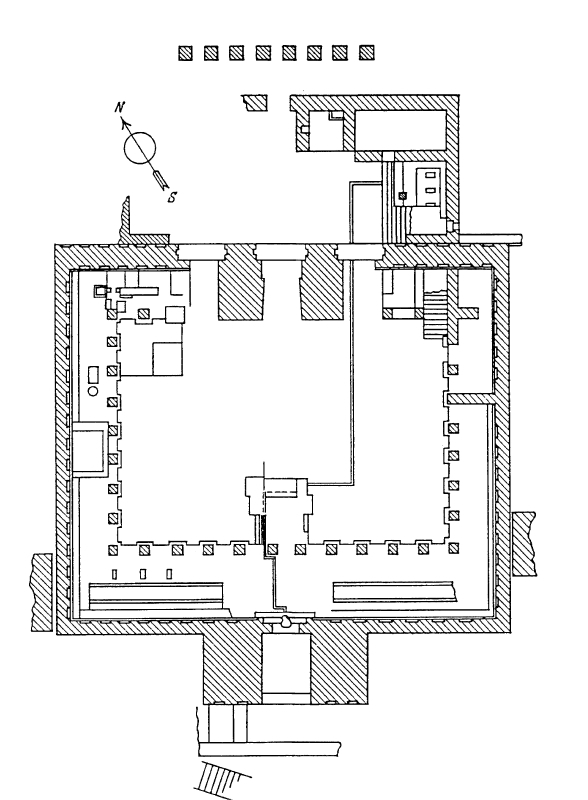
Peristyle hall plan

=== The peristyle hall ===
The hall has a semi-rectangular form, with a pillared 8 monolith propylaeum entrance, topped by square tenons designed to accommodate an architrave. The perimeter of the peristyle hall is approximately 42 m × 19 m and is flanked by the end of the oval-shaped enclosure in its western and eastern exterior walls. The interior of the structure contains a large library of inscribed stone blocks and 64 vertically double false windows motif with 32 pillars made from single monolith except two that once supported stone beams.

The number 8 seems to reflect a sacred number, since it is used at the entrance, interior pillars (8 × 4), and false windows (8 × 8). Ancient South Arabian buildings, including Awwam peristyle hall, appears to be pre-planned according to a system of prescribed measurements instead of full use of space. AFSM excavation in the paved courtyard revealed multiple South Arabian inscriptions, a group of broken column capitals, bronze plaques, altars, and numerous pottery statues, along with potsherds that date back roughly to 1500–1200 BCE.

Visitors of the sanctuary are obliged to go through the annex, then via a gate of three entrances into the peristyle hall. The gate could be closed if needed.

A visible water conduit made from alabaster used to run through the hall and into a bronze basin (69 × 200 cm) placed in a room for purification purposes. The water fell on the floor like a fountain, and it fell so long and with such force that it eventually cut through a copper basin placed under and then into the stone itself.

=== The oval shaped enclosure ===
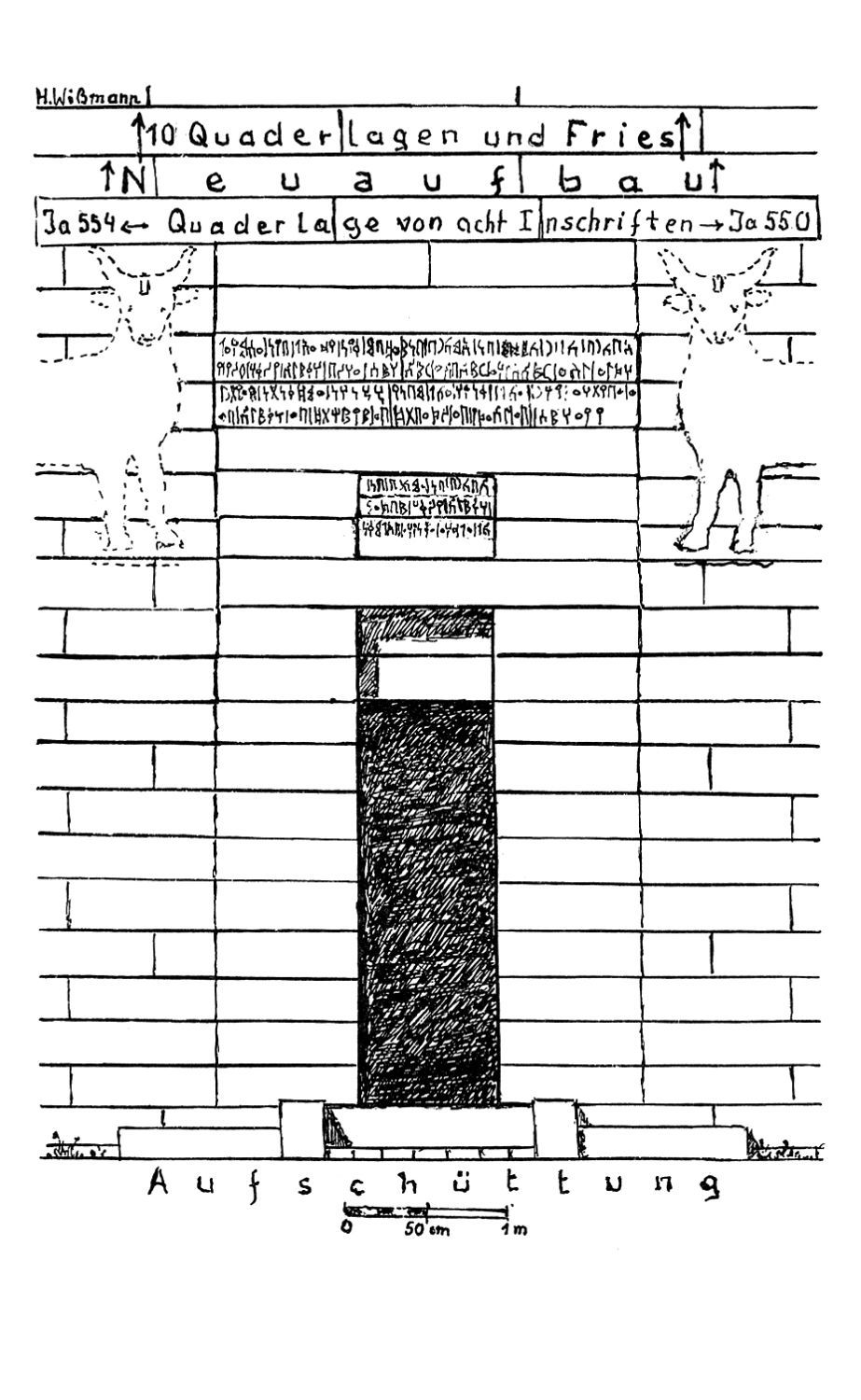
Reconstruction of the northwestern gate, only accessible to priests

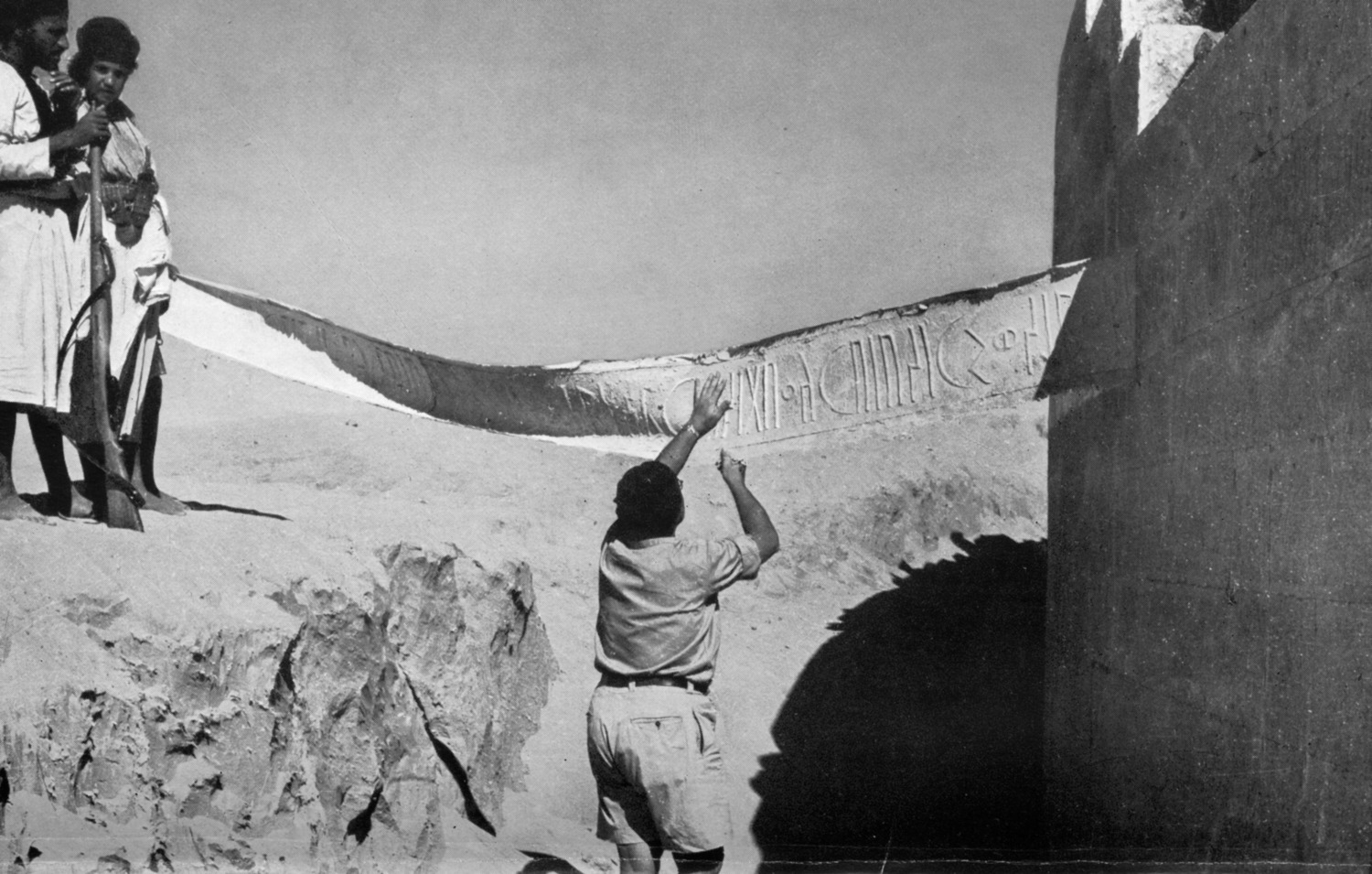
AFSM member with the help of locals copying an inscription from the sanctuary's exterior wall

The enclosure is defined by massive oval shaped wall that flank the peristyle hall from its western and eastern wings, the wall measures approximately 757 m long and 13 m high, however the original height can't be determined with certainty, and it is difficult to assess its full extent.

Many inscriptions, hundreds in quantity, were discovered in the sanctuary and nearby, only few that deals directly with the temple's construction. One of the terms used for the sanctuary was "gwbn"; the oracle sanctuary. The sanctuary includes a raised platform within the temple's sacred area representing primordial mound, which makes it more impressive when looked from a distance. It appears, from archeological investigation, that a cultic place was built around a wellspring inside the sanctuary.

The oval sanctuary is accessible from two gates, either through the northwestern gate, or from the peristyle hall one, the latter of which was the main entrance, while the former was exclusively built for priests. A third gate was discovered by AFSM, but this was restricted to funerary rites usage as it was the cemetery entrance, and could only be accessed from the interior of the oval sanctuary.

The oval sanctuary precinct was the main and holy part of Awwam temple. It was an open space that contains several structures, courtyards, and wellspring. Most rituals were performed in the oval sanctuary, and according to Sabaean inscriptions, was the house of Almaqah. This holiness is demonstrated by the existence of three places for purification and to perform ablutions before entering the sacred spaces, primarily the oval sanctuary (dwelling house of Almaqah). Cleanness is emphasized by the discovered inscriptions that deals with physical and spiritual purity of worshipers. Several inscriptions attest that an individual who enter the sanctuary without performing purification rituals, will suffer severe consequences. Although no detailed information concerning the act of purification is mentioned in Sabaean inscriptions.

== The cemetery ==
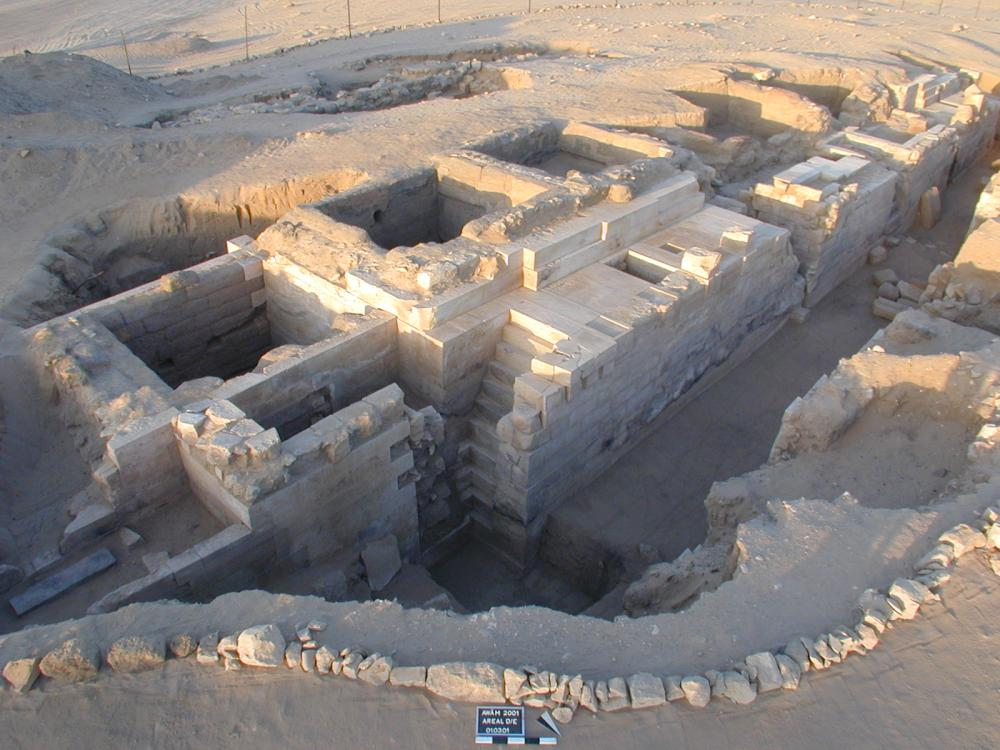
Awwam cemetery

The 7th century BCE cemetery is attached to the Oval Sanctuary, and apparently accessed only from it. The cemetery hosts around 20,000 estimated burials during its long period of usage. That lengthy period created a large settlement of the dead, where passages and streets divide the tombs. The cemetery tombs were multi-storey structures (up to four) built using excellently polished and dressed limestone blocks. External walls were sometimes decorated with friezes and low relief of the dead's face.

According to South Arabian inscriptions the cemetery was known as "Mhrm Gnztn" (cemetery sacred enclave). Despite the sacredness of the cemetery, no surplus of epigraphic remains for the ritual ceremonies were found in the complex. Apparently the rituals were conducted in the Oval Sanctuary Precinct, then they enter the cemetery where further ceremonies took place before burial.

The memory of the dead was preserved by placing sculptural representations of them on their tombs, frequently inscribing their names.

== Construction ==
The oldest inscription found in the complex was in reference to the building of the temple's massive enclosure known as The great wall of Awwam by Mukarrib Yada`'il Dharih I in the middle of the 7th century BCE. Indicating a much earlier period for the temple's construction. Yada`'il inscription was carved outside the wall, and contains the following:

Yadaʿʾil Dharih, son of Sumhuʾalay, mukarrib of Saba', walled ʾAwwam, the temple of Almaqah, when he sacrificed to Athtar and [when] he established the whole community [united] by a god and a patron and a pact and a [secret] trea[ty. By Athtar and by Hawbas and by] Almaqah.

== Excavations ==
Partial excavation of Awwam peristyle in 1951–1952 by the American Foundation for the Study of Man that was led by Wendell Philips, cleared the entrance court almost completely and made numerous discoveries. Such as elaborate bronze statues, and the usage of the southern entrance in the elliptic wall for ablution rituals before entering the cella.

== See also ==
- Barran Temple
- 2007 Temple of Awwam bombing

== Sources ==
- Le Baron Bowen Jr., Richard; Albright, Frank P. (1958). Archaeological Discoveries in South Arabia. Publications of the American Foundation for the Study of Man. Vol. 2. Baltimore: Johns Hopkins. OCLC 445765.
- Jamme, Albert (1962). Sabaean Inscriptions from Mahram Bilqîs (Marîb). Baltimore: Johns Hopkins.
- Korotayev, Andrey (1996). Pre-Islamic Yemen: Socio-political organization of the Sabaean cultural area in the 2nd and 3rd centuries AD. Wiesbaden: Harrassowitz. ISBN 3-447-03679-6.
- Maraqten, Mohammed (2015). "The Pilgrimage to the Awām Temple/Maḥram Bilqīs, Ma'rib, Yemen". In Arbach, Mounir; Schiettecatte, Jérémie (eds.). Pre-Islamic South Arabia and its Neighbours: New Developments of Research. Archaeopress. pp. 107–133.
- Maraqten, Mohammed (2021). "The Pilgrimage to the Awām Temple/Maḥram Bilqīs, Ma'rib, Yemen". In Hatke, George; Ruzicka, Ronald (eds.). South Arabian Long-Distance Trade in Antiquity. Cambridge Scholars Publishing. pp. 430–462.
- Müller (Hrsg.), Walter W.; von Wissmann, Hermann (1982). Das Grossreich der Sabäer bis zu seinem Ende im frühen 4. Jahrhundert vor Christus. Die Geschichte von Saba'II [The United Kingdom of the Sabeans to its end in the early 4th century BC. The history of Saba'II]. Philosophisch-historische Klasse (in German). Vol. 402. Sitzungsberichte [Meeting notes]. Wien: Österreichische Akademie der Wissenschaften [Austrian Academy of Sciences]. ISBN 3-7001-0516-9.
- Nebes, Norbert (2023). "Early Saba and its Neighbors". In Radner, Karen; Moeller, Nadine; Potts, Daniel (eds.). The Oxford History of the Ancient Near East: Volume V: the Age of Persia. Oxford University Press. pp. 299–375. ISBN 978-0-19-068766-3.
- Robin, Christian Julien (2018). "Marib et Makka : deux pèlerinages de l'Arabie préislamique qui se tenaient à la veille de l'équinoxe de printemps". Graeco-Arabica, 12, 2017 (= 13th Internat. Congress on Graeco-Oriental and African Studies, Proceedings). Herodotus. pp. 661–673.
- Zaid, Zaydoon; Maraqten, Mohammed (2008). "The Peristyle Hall: remarks on the history of construction based on recent archaeological and epigraphic evidence of the AFSM expedition to the Awām temple in Mārib, Yemen". Proceedings of the Seminar for Arabian Studies. 38: 327–339. JSTOR 41223960.
