= Sirwah =

Ancient city in Yemen

- صرواح (Arabic)
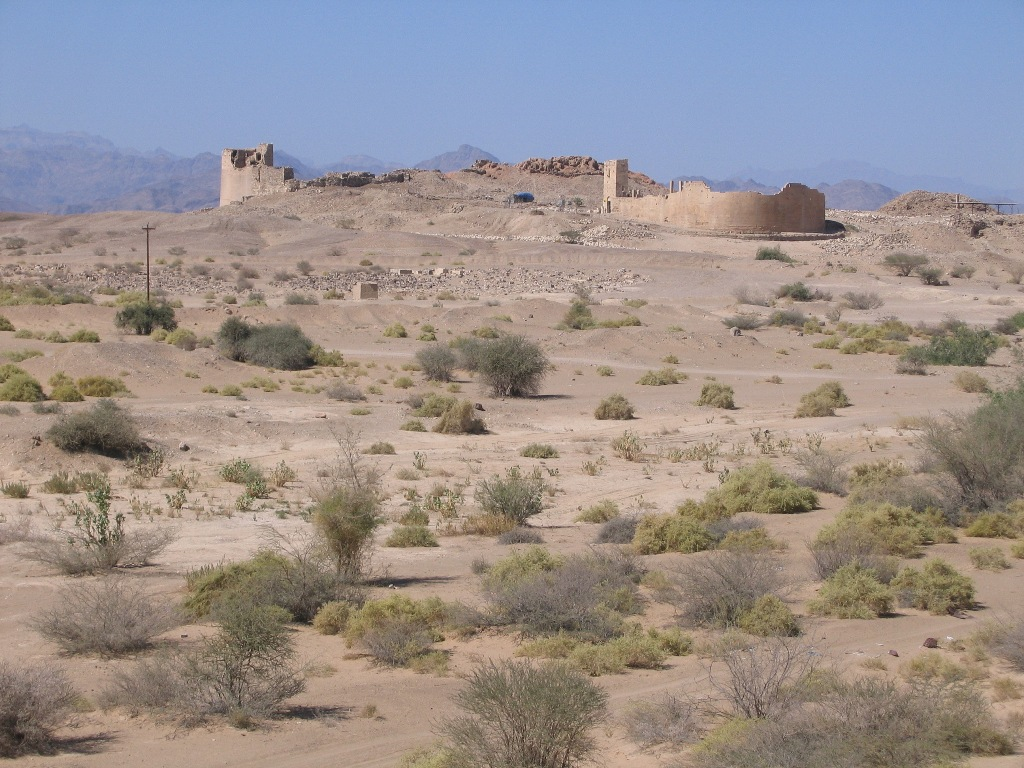
- View of Ṣirwāḥ

- Location within Yemen
- 15°27′N 45°1′E
- Type: Settlement
- Location: Ma'rib Governorate, Yemen

Site notes
- Condition: In ruins

UNESCO World Heritage Site
- Part of: Landmarks of the Ancient Kingdom of Saba, Marib
- Criteria: Cultural: (iii), (iv)
- Reference: 1700
- Inscription: 2023 (45th Session)
- Endangered: 2023–...

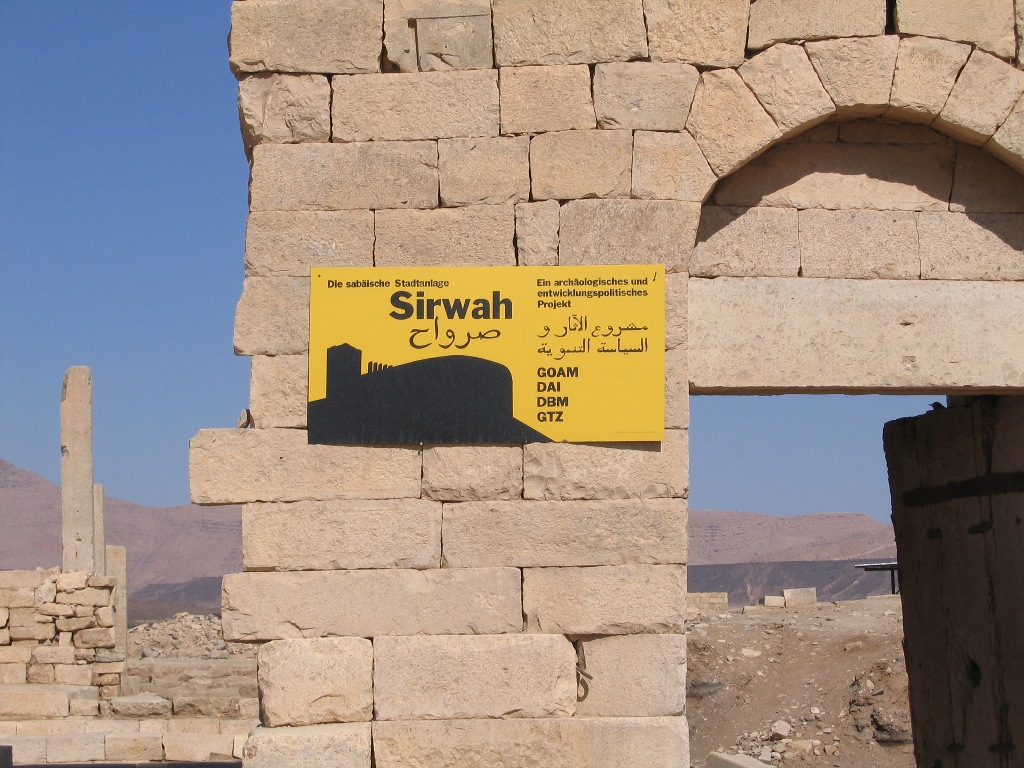
German archaeologists in Ṣirwāḥ

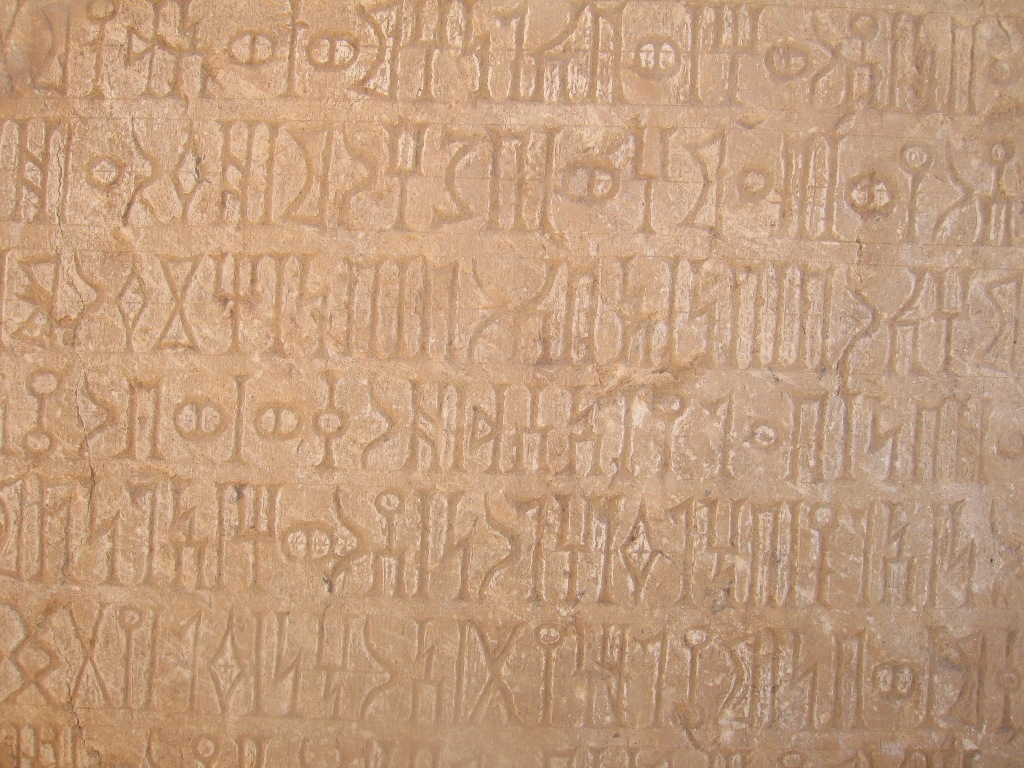
Inscription in Ṣirwāḥ

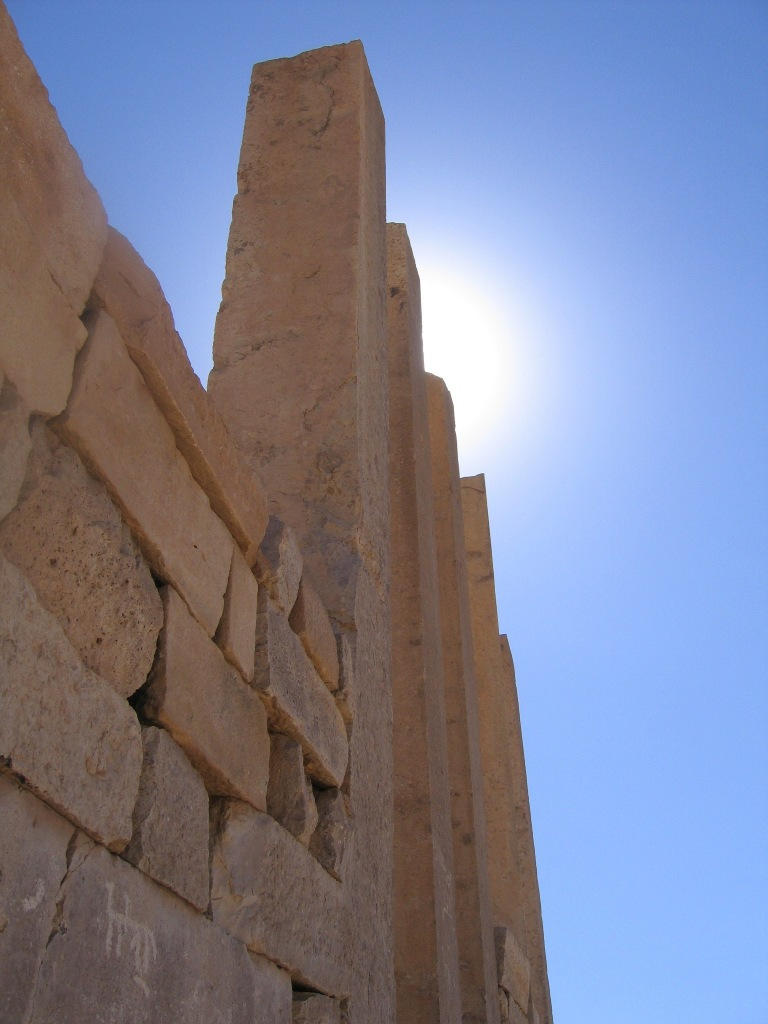
Pillars in Ṣirwāḥ

Sirwah (OSA: Ṣrwḥ, Arabic: صرواح خولان Ṣirwāḥ Ḫawlān) was, after Ma'rib, the most important economical and political center of the Kingdom of Saba at the beginning of the 1st century BC, on the Arabian Peninsula. Ṣirwāḥ was surrounded by a fortified wall. The city layout inside the oasis included a number of large buildings. It’s also a part of Khawlan.

The ruins of Ṣirwāḥ are located 40 km west of Ma'rib. The town was well protected by its position in the mountains, but at the same time put limits on its development. As a result, Ṣirwāḥ quickly lost its position as a capital, which was taken over by Ma’rib, which was in an important economical center since it was located on the incense route. The town nevertheless remained an important centre for the Sabaeans, as shown by the large number of temple buildings. It was also the site chosen by King Yada'il Dharih I to build an important temple to Almaqah about the year 700 BC.

In 2023, along with other landmarks of the ancient Kingdom of Saba, Sirwah was added to the UNESCO World Heritage List.

== Archaeology ==
Archaeologists from the German Archaeological Institute have in 2005 discovered and salvaged an inscription from the Sabaean Kingdom that is ca. seven meters long and weighs over seven tonne. This heavy block of stone was a standing feature of the sanctuary of Almaqah and had fallen from its plinth during an earthquake. The inscription gives an account of the battles of a Sabaean, carried out against his immediate neighbors in the south-east and north of Yemen. The epigraphist Norbert Nebes from the University of Jena described the inscription as the most important one so far from the period of the first century BC.

Some restorative work was undertaken on these sites before the breakout of the Yemeni Civil War. During these works a further temple was discovered dating back to the 7th century BC. This sanctuary has a monumental entrance, decorated with pillars. It contains a number of rooms, built out of wood and stone, the layout is unique for Yemen in this period. One of the longest inscriptions which composed of 20 lines is describing the conquerors and campaigns by king Karib'il Watar.

Since the breakout of civil war in Yemen in 2015, Ṣirwāḥ has been a frontline between the Houthi rebels and forces allied with President Abdrabbuh Mansur Hadi, making excavations almost impossible. Prior to this, a number of German excavations took place in Ṣirwāḥ, which it was hoped would further knowledge about the earliest days of the Sabaean Kingdom.

== Bibliography ==
- Nebes, Norbert (2016). Der Tatenbericht des Yiṯaamar Watar bin Yakrubmalik aus Ṣirwāḥ (Jemen). Zur Geschichte Südarabiens im frühen 1. Jahrtausend vor Christus [The account of the deeds of Yiṯaamar Watar bin Yakrubmalik from Ṣirwāḥ (Yemen). On the history of southern Arabia in the early 1st millennium BC]. Epigraphische Forschungen auf der arabischen Halbinsel. Vol. 7. Tübingen: Wasmuth. ISBN 978-3-8030-2203-5.
- Röring, Nicole (2006). Bauhistorische Untersuchungen am Almaqah-Heiligtum von Sirwah. Vom Kultplatz zum Heiligtum [Studies in architectural history on the Almaqah sanctuary of Sirwah. From cult site to sanctuary]. Cottbus.
