= Manar =

Manar (Arabic: منار, lit. 'Lighthouse'), sometimes Al Manar (with the Arabic definite article "al-"), may refer to:

== Manar ==
=== People ===
- Andy Manar (born 1975), Democratic member of the Illinois Senate
- Houari Manar (1981–2019), Algerian raï singer
- Manar al-Sharif, Syrian peace activist

=== Places ===
- Manar Dam, a dam on the Manar river near Kandhar, Maharashtra, India
- Mannar Island (formerly Manar), an island in Sri Lanka
- Mannar, Sri Lanka (formerly Manar), a town in Sri Lanka

== Al-Manar ==
- Al-Manar, a Lebanese television station affiliated with Hezbollah
  - Al-Manar Football Festival, a football award ceremony organised by Al-Manar
- Al-Manār (magazine), a defunct Egyptian Islamic magazine
- Al-Manar Centre, a Salafi mosque in the Cathays district of Cardiff, Wales
- Al Manar district, a district in the Dhamar Governorate, Yemen
- Al-Manar (Ibb), a sub-district in Yemen
- Al Manar National School, Handessa, a national school in Sri Lanka
- Al-Manar University of Tripoli, a university in Tripoli, Lebanon
- Tunis El Manar University, a university in Tunis, Tunisia
