= ISO 3166-2:YE =

Entry for Yemen in ISO 3166-2

ISO 3166-2:YE is the entry for Yemen in ISO 3166-2, part of the ISO 3166 standard published by the International Organization for Standardization (ISO), which defines codes for the names of the principal subdivisions (e.g., provinces or states) of all countries coded in ISO 3166-1.

Currently for Yemen, ISO 3166-2 codes are defined for one municipality and 21 governorates. The municipality Sanaa is the capital of the country and has special status equal to the governorates.

Each code consists of two parts separated by a hyphen. The first part is YE, the ISO 3166-1 alpha-2 code of Yemen. The second part is two letters.

== Current codes ==
Subdivision names are listed as in the ISO 3166-2 standard published by the ISO 3166 Maintenance Agency (ISO 3166/MA).

Click on the button in the header to sort each column.

Code	Subdivision name (ar) (BGN/PCGN 1956)	Subdivision name (ar) (Note: For reference only, Arabic name in Arabic script not included in the ISO 3166-2 standard.)	Subdivision name (en) (Note: For reference only, English name not included in the ISO 3166-2 standard.)	Subdivision category
YE-AD	‘Adan	عدن	Aden	governorate
YE-AM	‘Amrān	عمران	Amran	governorate
YE-AB	Abyan	أَبْيَنْ	Abyan	governorate
YE-DA	Aḑ Ḑāli‘	الضالع	Dhale	governorate
YE-BA	Al Bayḑā’	البيضاء	Beida	governorate
YE-HU	Al Ḩudaydah	الْحُدَيْدَة	Western Coast	governorate
YE-JA	Al Jawf	الجوف	Jouf	governorate
YE-MR	Al Mahrah	ٱلْمَهْرَة	Mahra	governorate
YE-MW	Al Maḩwīt	ٱلْمَحْوِيْت	Mahwit	governorate
YE-SA	Amānat al ‘Āşimah [city]	صَنْعَاء	Sanaa City	municipality
YE-SU	Arkhabīl Suquţrá	سقطرى	Socotra	governorate
YE-DH	Dhamār	ذَمَار	Dhamar	governorate
YE-HD	Ḩaḑramawt	حضرموت	Hadhramaut	governorate
YE-HJ	Ḩajjah	حجة	Hajjah	governorate
YE-IB	Ibb	إبّ	Ibb	governorate
YE-LA	Laḩij	لحج	Lahij	governorate
YE-MA	Ma’rib	مَأْرِب	Marib	governorate
YE-RA	Raymah	ريمة	Raymah	governorate
YE-SD	Şāʻdah	صَعْدَة	Saada	governorate
YE-SN	Şanʻā’	صَنْعَاء	Sanaa	governorate
YE-SH	Shabwah	شَبْوَة	Shabwah	governorate
YE-TA	Tāʻizz	تَعِزّ	Taiz	governorate

== Changes ==
The following changes to the entry have been announced by the ISO 3166/MA since the first publication of ISO 3166-2 in 1998. ISO stopped issuing newsletters in 2013.

Edition/Newsletter	Date issued	Description of change in newsletter	Code/Subdivision change
Newsletter I-4	2002-12-10	Addition of two governorates	Subdivisions added: YE-DA Aḑ Ḑāli'; YE-AM 'Amrān
ISO 3166-2:2007	2007-12-13	Second edition of ISO 3166-2 (this change was not announced in a newsletter)	Subdivisions added: YE-SA Şan‘ā' [city]
Newsletter II-2	2010-06-30	Update of the administrative structure and its alphabetical order and update of the list source	Subdivisions added: YE-RA Raymah
Online Browsing; Platform (OBP)	2014-11-17	Change spelling for YE-SA; update List Source	Spelling change: YE-SA Şan‘ā’ [city] → Amānat al ‘Āşimah [city]
Online Browsing; Platform (OBP)	2015-11-27	Change of subdivision name of YE-DA, YE-AD, YE-BA, YE-AM, YE-MA; addition of governorate YE-SU; addition of romanisation system of YE-RA; update List Source	Subdivision added: YE-SU Arkhabīl Suquţrá; Name changes: YE-AD; YE-AM; YE-BA; YE-DA; YE-MA
Online Browsing; Platform (OBP)	2016-11-15	Change of spelling of YE-AB; update list source	Spelling change: YE-AB Abyān → Abyan

== See also ==
- Subdivisions of Yemen
- FIPS region codes of Yemen
- Neighbouring countries: OM, SA
