= Al Manar National School, Handessa =

- அல்-மனார் தேசிய பாடசாலை, ஹந்தஸ்ஸ

Location
- Handessa, Kandy District; Central Province; Sri Lanka; 7.21866°N 80.57392°E

Information
- School type: Public National School
- Motto: Lord! Reward Me Wisdom
- Denomination: Ministry of Education, Sri Lanka
- Established: 26 March 1892
- Authority: Ministry of Education, Sri Lanka
- Oversight: Ministry of Education, Sri Lanka
- Principal: M. M. S. Zareena
- Teaching staff: 68
- Grades: Class 6-13
- Gender: Mixed
- Age: 11 to 19
- Enrolment: 1,500–2,250
- Language: Tamil and English
- Colors: Maroon and yellow
- Alumni: Old Almanarians

Al Manar National School (commonly known as Al-Manar College or simply as Al-Manar), Tamil: அல்-மனார் is a national school in Handessa, Kandy. It was founded 15 September 1892. It is one of the oldest Muslim schools established in Sri Lanka.

== School ==
The Al Manar National School was founded in 1892 as Pethiyagoda Tamil School in Thalawathura. It was later moved to Boowelikada in 1929 and named as Ketakumbura Tamil school, then in 1964 it was moved to its current location in Ambarapola. At that time the school was called Al Manar Maha Vidyalaya and later on in 1999 it was renamed Al Manar Central College (National School).

== 125 years anniversary ==
For the school's 125th anniversary the Al Manar management board, SDC, OBA and OGA joined together and planned a 125-year celebration walk.

== Houses ==
The students are divided into six houses, which are split by gender. The houses, led by house captains, compete in all major games to win the inter-house games. The houses are:

Boys

- Akbar colour : Blue
- Ikbal colour : Yellow
- Jinna colour : Green

Girls

- Jesmine colour : Yellow
- Lotus colour : Purple
- Orchid colour : Pink

== Officials ==
Name	From	To	
Weerasooriya Pallewala	15.09.1892	1896	Headmaster
K. M. Banda	1896	01.09.1918	Headmaster
S. A. G. Charles	16.01.1910	30.09.1918	Assistant teacher
S. A. G. Charles	01.10.1918	30.04.1925	Assistant teacher
Manual Fernando	01.05.1925	31.03.1926	Headmaster
K. Muththaiya	01.04.1926	30.10.1926	assistant Headmaster
J. W. Muththiya	01.11.1926	31.12.1944	Headmaster
S. Murugesu	01.01.1945	31.07.1949	Headmaster
M. Abdussalam	01.08.1949	31.12.1955	Headmaster
K. M. Abdul Gaffar	01.01.1956	14.09.1967	Head master
B. G. N. Sharifodeen	15.09.1967	20.04.1968	Headmaster
A. M. Abdul Gafoor	20.04.1968	31.08.1970	Principal
A. A. M. Fuaji	01.09.1970	07.02.1972	Principal
M. S. M. M. Hassen	08.02.1972	14.03.1972	acting Principal
K. M. Abdul Gaffar	15.03.1972	30.07.1977	Principal
M. S. M. M. Hassen	01.08.1977	21.02.1978	acting Principal
K. L. Abu Bakkar	22.02.1978	30.05.1981	principal
H. M. Thayib	01.06.1981	31.03.1989	principal
C. L. Issadeen	01.04.1989	06.06.1989	acting principal
A. C. M. Hussain	07.06.1989	31.12.1990	principal
C. L. Issadeen	01.01.1991	31.01.1991	acting principal
M. L. Thajudeen	01.02.1991	16.12.1996	principal
O. M. Jabir	16.12.1996	28.02.1998	acting principal
I. L. H. Careem	01.03.1998	22.11.1998	acting principal
B. M. Jameel	23.11.1998	30.06.2008	principal
M. Seyyadu Meeras	01.07.2008	06.12.2015	principal
M. J. M. Hijas	07.12.2015	28.05.2025	principal
M. M. S. Zareena	29.05.2025	present	principal

== Gallery ==
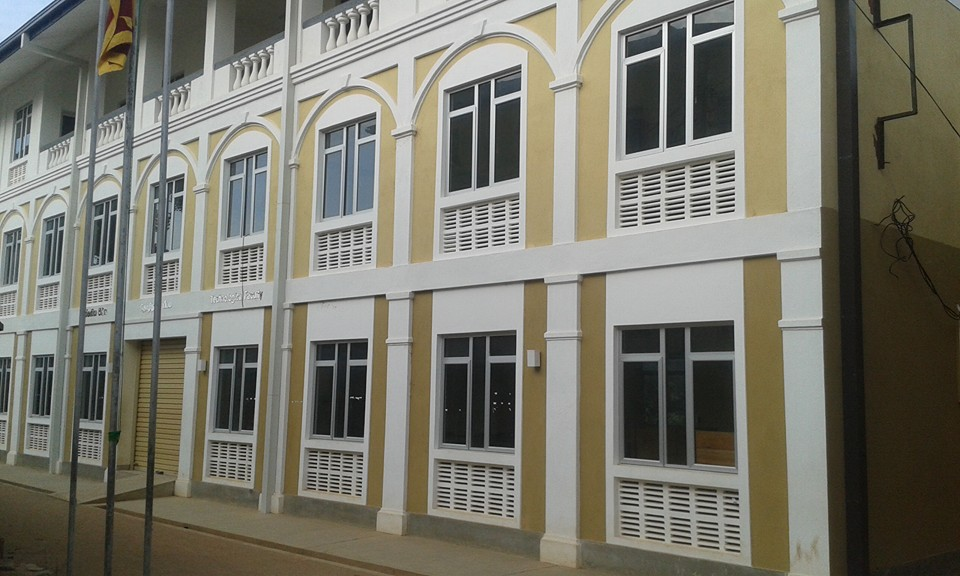
New building

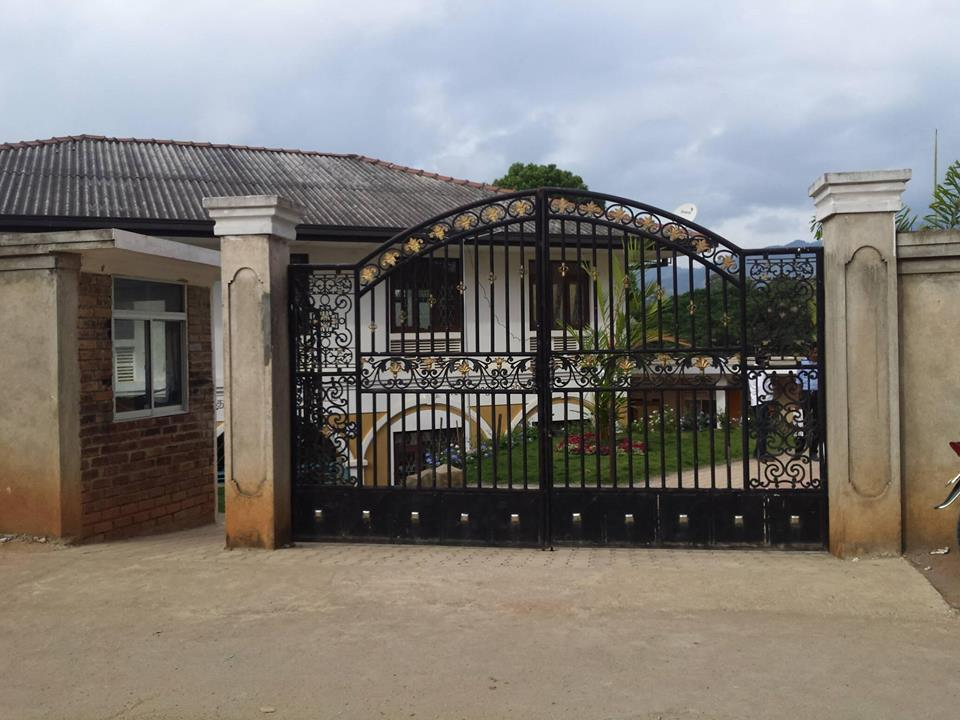
School entrance gate
