= Maʽbar =

Maʽbar معبر
- Town
- Location in Yemen
- Coordinates: 14.79395°N 44.29354°E
- Country: Yemen
- Governorate: Dhamar
- District: Jahran
- Elevation: 7,641 ft (2,329 m)
- Time zone: UTC+3 (Yemen Standard Time)

Maʽbar (Arabic: معبر Maʽbar) is a market and farming town in Dhamar Governorate, Yemen, and the seat of Jahran District. It is located about 60 km south of Sanaa, at the northern end of the Dhamar plain, at the intersection of the country's main north–south highway and the old route down to the Yemeni Tihama, which was paved in the 1980s. The pipeline connecting the oilfields in Al Jawf Governorate to Ra's Isa on the Red Sea coast crosses the north–south highway near Maʽbar.
