= Administrative divisions of Yemen =

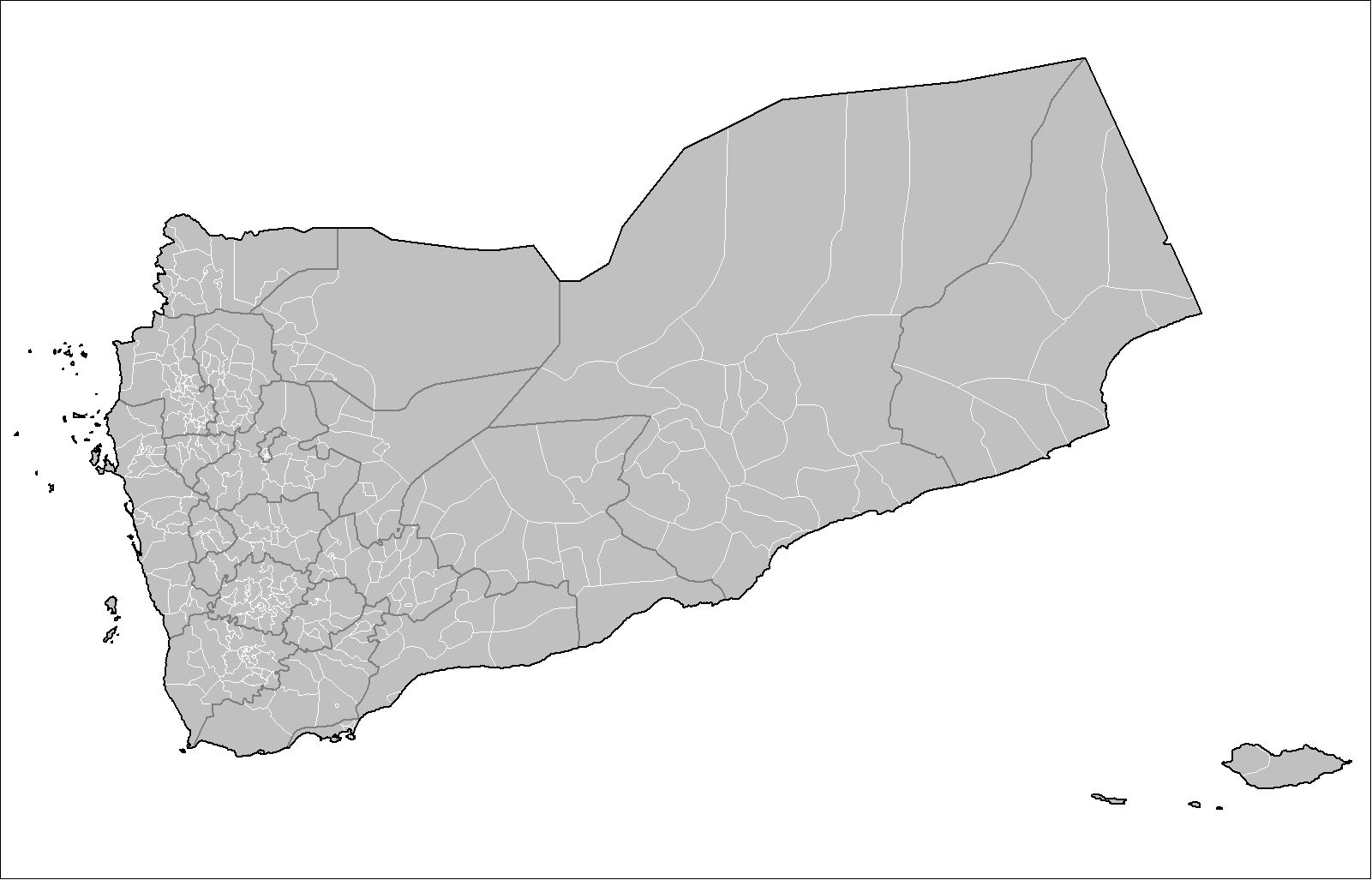
Map of Yemen's Governates and Districts

The administrative division of Yemen consists of two main divisions (governorates and districts). There are 22 governorates, including the capital Sanaa (Amanat Al Asima) and Socotra Archipelago. The 22 governorates are then divided into 333 districts, subdivided into 2,210 sub-districts, and then into 38,284 villages (as of 2001).

Throughout history, Yemen has been divided into several administrative divisions. In the Ottoman era, the Yemen Vilayet (from Arabic ولاية wilayah) was divided into sanjaks (also called livas). Sanjaks were further subdivided into kazas. During the reign of the Mutawakkillite Kingdom of Yemen, some of the elements were integrated into a new division. These divisions were also used by the later Yemen Arab Republic with minor adjustments.

According to the outputs of the Yemeni National Dialogue Conference, Yemen was expected to be divided in late 2014 into six provinces: 'Azal, Al-Janad, Tihama, Hadhramaut, Saba, and Aden.

== Administrative divisions ==
There are two main administrative divisions in Yemen: governorates and districts.

1. Governorates (Arabic: محافظة muhafazah) are the highest administrative division in Yemen. Yemen is divided into twenty-one governorates and one municipality.
2. Districts (Arabic: مديرية madiria) are the second administrative division in Yemen. Each governorate in Yemen is split into a number of districts for a total of 333 districts in Yemen.

The remaining administrative divisions are separate for urban and rural areas.

Administrative divisions in urban areas are as follows.

1. Cities (Arabic: مدن mudun) are an administrative division in Yemen, defined as being the seats of governorates and/or districts. They tend to have a substantial population and a variety of services.
2. Neighborhoods (Arabic: حي hayy) are the fourth-level administrative division in Yemen's urban areas. It consists of multiple adjacent blocks, the amount varying from neighborhood to neighborhood.
3. Blocks (Arabic: حارة hara) are the lowest-level administrative division in urban areas. They are defined as groups of adjacent buildings surrounded by a group of streets to separate them from other blocks.

Administrative divisions in rural areas are as follows.

1. 'Uzal (Arabic: عزلة 'uzlah) are the next-level administrative division following districts in Yemen's rural areas. They are filled with villages. There are about 2,210 'uzal in Yemen.
2. Villages (Arabic: قرية qariyya) are a fourth-level administrative division in Yemen. They are clustered settlements, similar to towns. They may range in size from only a couple houses to sizable communities. They also typically include shops and fields for agriculture. There are roughly 40,000 villages in Yemen.

== List of the divisions of Yemen ==
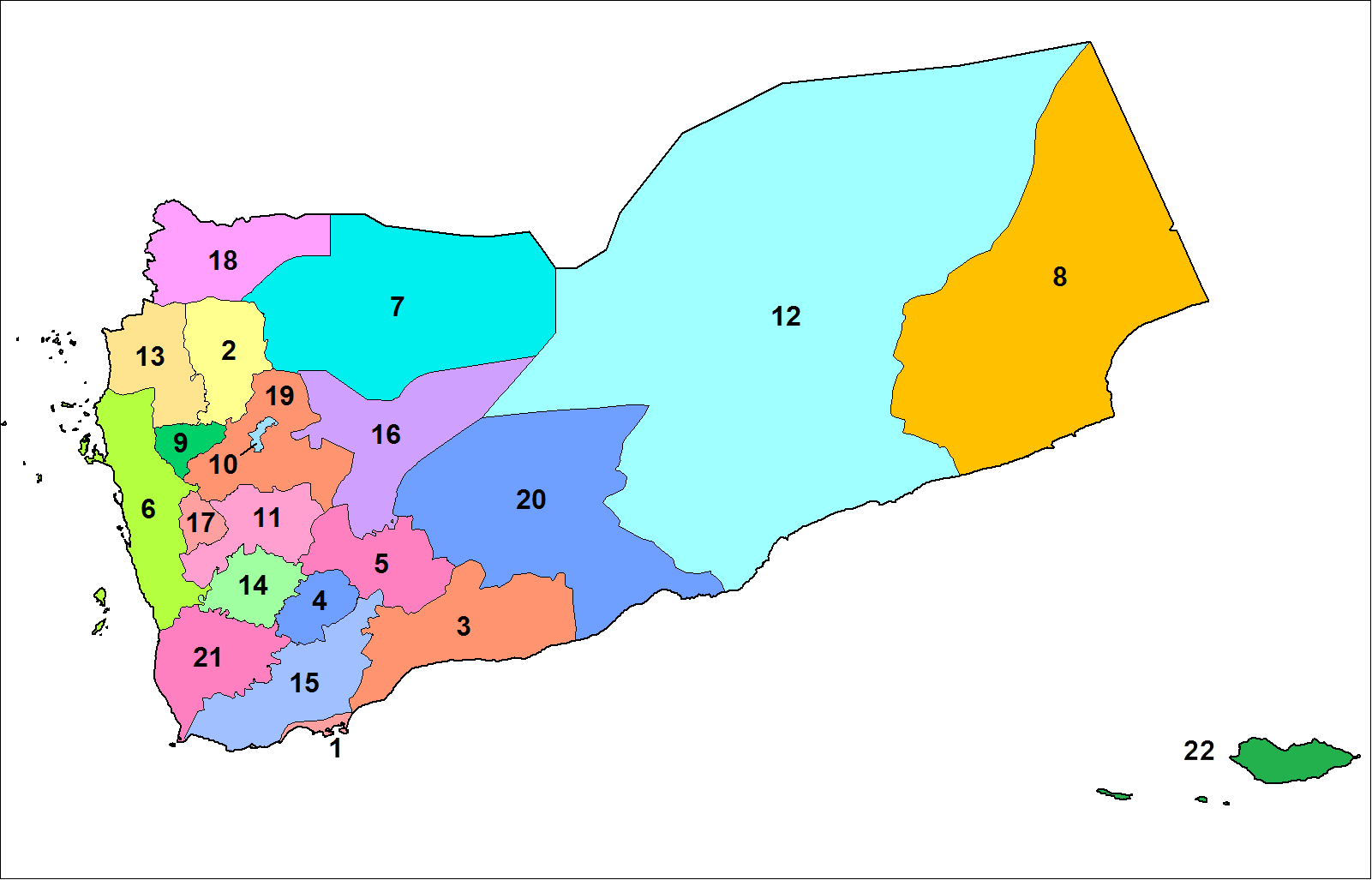
Governorates of Yemen

Governorates of Yemen with labels

Key	Division	Capital city	Population 2004 census	Population 2006 est.
1	Aden	Aden	589,419	634,710
2	'Amran	'Amran	877,786	909,992
3	Abyan	Zinjibar	433,819	454,535
4	Dhale	Dhale	470,564	504,533
5	Al-Bayda	Al Bayda	577,369	605,303
6	Al Hudaydah	Hodeidah	2,157,552	2,300,179
7	Al Jawf	Al Jawf	443,797	465,737
8	Al Mahrah	Al Ghaydah	88,594	96,768
9	Al Mahwit	Al Mahwit	494,557	523,236
10	Amanat Al Asimah	Sanaa	1,747,834	1,947,139
11	Dhamar	Dhamar	1,330,108	1,412,142
12	Hadhramaut	Mukalla	1,028,556	1,092,967
13	Hajjah	Hajjah	1,479,568	1,570,872
14	Ibb	Ibb	2,131,861	2,238,537
15	Lahij	Lahij	722,694	761,160
16	Marib	Marib	238,522	251,668
17	Raymah	Al Jabin	394,448	418,659
18	Saada	Saada	695,033	746,957
19	Sanaa	Sanaa	919,215	957,798
20	Shabwah	Ataq	470,440	494,638
21	Taiz	Taiz	2,393,425	2,513,003
22	Socotra	Hadibu	^{1)}	^{1)}

^{1)} Soqatra Governorate was created in December 2013 from parts of Hadramaut, data included there

== Historical subdivisions ==
Yemen became a unified country in May 1990 after the merger of the northern "Yemen Arab Republic" (North Yemen) and the southern "People's Democratic Republic of Yemen" (South Yemen).

=== Governorates of South Yemen ===
Map of the governorates

Following independence, South Yemen was divided into six governorates (Arabic: muhafazat), with roughly natural boundaries, each given a Roman numeral.

Numeral	Name	Approximate area (km.²)	Capital
I	Aden	6,980	Aden
II	Lahij	12,766	Lahij
III	Abyan	21,489	Zinjibar
IV	Shabwah	73,908	Ataq
V	Hadhramawt	155,376	Mukalla
VI	al-Mahra	66,350	Al Ghaydah

=== Provinces of North Yemen ===
Until 1980, North Yemen was split into governorates. In 1980, the country was reorganized into eight provinces (Arabic: liwa).

Name	Approximate area (km.²)
Al-Bayda'	15,000
Al-Hudaydah	35,000
Hajjah	17,000
Ibb	13,000
Rida'	10,000
Saada	18,000
Sanaa	80,000
Taiz	12,000
