= Timnaʿ =

Battle during the Sabaean campaign against the Southern Coalition

Fighting near Timnaʿ
- Part of Campaign against the Southern Coalition; Campaign against Awsān
| Date | c. 3rd century AD |
| Location | Near Timnaʿ, ancient South Arabia |
| Result | Sabaean victory; coalition forces defeated and Sabaean army successfully withdrew to Maʾrib |
| Territorial changes | Sabaean forces maintained control of captured territories |

Belligerents
- Kingdom of Sabaʾ and Dhū Raydān

Commanders and leaders
| Dharihan Ashwa'; Rabbsamsum Yuʿirr | Unknown coalition commanders |

Units involved
| Royal Sabaean Army; Sabaean tribal contingents; Forces of Fayṣān commanded by Dharihan Ashwa'; Forces of Yuhbiʿil commanded by Dharihan Ashwa'; Forces commanded by Rabbsamsum Yuʿirr | Qatabanian forces; Hadramawti forces; Maʿāhir forces; Radmānite forces; Hawlānite/allied tribal forces |

Strength
| Unknown | Unknown |

Casualties and losses
| Unknown | Unknown; coalition forces suffered heavy losses and the military alliance ceased to function effectively |

The Fighting near Timnaʿ was a military engagement during the later stages of the Campaign against the Southern Coalition, recorded in the Sabaean inscription Ja 629. It occurred after the Sabaean campaigns against Radmān, Halzawum, and Awsān, when remaining coalition forces attempted to resist the Sabaean advance.

== Background ==
Following the Sabaean victories against the southern coalition, including the capture of Awsānite settlements, Sabaean forces continued their operations deeper into southern Arabia. The campaign eventually brought Sabaean forces near Timnaʿ, the capital of Qatabān.

The inscription records that Dharihan Ashwa' and Rabbshamsum Yuʿirr were involved in operations near Timnaʿ during the final phase of the campaign.

== Battle ==
The engagement took place when coalition forces attempted to confront the advancing Sabaean army. The Sabaean commanders resisted the opposing forces and successfully completed their withdrawal toward Maʾrib.

== Outcome ==
The fighting near Timnaʿ represented the final phase of the wider campaign. Although coalition forces attempted to continue resistance, the Sabaean army remained successful and returned to its capital at Maʾrib.

The campaign resulted in the weakening of Awsān and the dismantling of the southern coalition as an effective military alliance.
