= List of regions of Yemen by Human Development Index =

This is a list of regions of Yemen by Human Development Index as of 2025 with data for the year 2023.

Rank	Region (Governorate)	HDI (2023)
Low human development
1	Abyan, Aden, Lahij, Dhale	0.533
2	Sana'a (with Sana'a city)	0.530
3	Al Jawf, Hadramaut, Shabwah, Ma'rib, Al Mahrah, Socotra	0.523
4	Taiz	0.510
5	Ibb	0.480
–	Yemen	0.480
6	Al Hudaydah, Al Mahwit	0.430
7	Al Bayda, Dhamar, Raymah	0.427
8	Hajjah, Sa'dah, 'Amran	0.421
