= Awsān campaign =

Sabaean military campaign against Awsān

Awsān Campaign against the Southern Coalition
- Part of Campaign against the Southern Coalition
| Date | c. 3rd century AD |
| Location | Awsān, ancient South Arabia |
| Result | Sabaean victory; Awsan Destroyed, Southern coalition Dismantled. |
| Territorial changes | Sabaean forces captured Awsānite settlements and weakened Awsān's ability to support the anti-Sabaean coalition |

Belligerents
| Kingdom of Sabaʾ and Dhū Raydān | Awsān; Hadramawt; Qatabān; Maʿāhir; Radmān; Awsān; Hawlān |

Commanders and leaders
| As'ad Shams Asri'; Murthid Yuhahmid; Dharihan Ashwa' | Unknown Awsānite rulers and commanders |

Units involved
| Royal Sabaean Army; Sabean tribes; Fayṣān tribal contingents under Dharihan; Yuhbiʿil tribal contingents under Dharihan | Awsānite forces; Garrisons of Awsānite cities and fortresses; allied and local tribes |

Strength
| Unknown | Unknown |

Casualties and losses
| Unknown | Awsan Severely weakened, Southern coalition effectively destroyed. |

The Awsān Campaign was a military campaign conducted by the Kingdom of Sabaʾ and Dhū Raydān against the Kingdom of Awsān during the wider Campaign against the Southern Coalition. The campaign is recorded in the Sabaean inscription Ja 629, which describes the participation of King As'ad Shams Asri', his son Murthid Yuhahmid, and the commander Dharihan Ashwa'.

The campaign formed one of the final phases of the wider conflict between Sabaʾ and the southern coalition that had opposed its expansion. After defeating coalition forces in earlier engagements, Sabaean forces continued their offensive into the territories of remaining opponents, including Awsān.

== Background ==
The Awsān Campaign followed earlier Sabaean victories during the wider southern campaign, including the Battle of Radmān and the Siege of Halzawum. These earlier operations weakened the military strength of the coalition opposing Sabaʾ and allowed the Sabaean army to continue advancing into southern Arabian territories.

Awsān had been associated with the wider coalition opposing Sabaean authority. Following the defeat of coalition forces in previous engagements, the Sabaean army shifted from defensive operations to an offensive campaign aimed at reducing Awsān's remaining military and political power.

The campaign was conducted under the authority of King As'ad Shams Asri' and involved his son Murthid Yuhahmid and the royal commander Dharihan Ashwa', who had previously led tribal contingents during the wider conflict.

== Operations ==
=== Capture of Manwabum ===
Capture of Manwabum
- Part of Awsān Campaign
| Date | c. 3rd century AD |
| Location | Manwabum, Awsān |
| Result | Sabaean victory |
| Territorial changes | Manwabum captured and plundered by Sabaean forces |

Belligerents
| Kingdom of Sabaʾ and Dhū Raydān | Awsān |

Commanders and leaders
| As'ad Shams Asri'; Murthid Yuhahmid; Dharihan Ashwa' | Unknown Awsānite commanders |

Units involved
| Royal Sabaean Army | Awsānite forces |

Strength
| Unknown | Unknown |

Casualties and losses
| Minor casualties | Unknown, Awsanite Forces severely weakened. |

The first named operation of the Awsān Campaign was the capture of Manwabum. According to Ja 629, Sabaean forces advanced into Awsānite territory and seized the city, taking spoils from the settlement.

The capture of Manwabum represented the opening stage of the direct Sabaean offensive against Awsān. The loss of the city demonstrated the inability of Awsān to prevent Sabaean forces from penetrating its territory.

=== Assaults on the Cities and Fortresses of Awsān ===
Assaults on the Cities and Fortresses of Awsān
- Part of Awsān Campaign
| Date | c. 3rd century AD |
| Location | Awsān, ancient South Arabia |
| Result | Sabaean victory |

Belligerents
| Kingdom of Sabaʾ and Dhū Raydān | Awsān |

Commanders and leaders
| As'ad Shams Asri'; Murthid Yuhahmid; Dharihan Ashwa' | Unknown Awsānite commanders |

Units involved
| Royal Sabaean Army | Awsānite forces |

Strength
| Unknown | Unknown |

Casualties and losses
| Unknown | Unknown |

After the capture of Manwabum, the Sabaean army continued its advance against Awsān. The inscription records attacks against the cities and fortresses of Awsān, indicating a broader campaign against Awsānite settlements rather than a single isolated battle.

These operations targeted fortified locations throughout Awsānite territory. The campaign appears to have aimed at dismantling Awsān's ability to organize resistance by capturing strategic settlements and weakening its political and military infrastructure.

The continued Sabaean advance demonstrated the collapse of organized Awsānite resistance and allowed the Sabaean army to continue toward further objectives.

=== Capture of Sayʿān ===
Capture of Sayʿān
- Part of Awsān Campaign
| Date | c. 3rd century AD |
| Location | Sayʿān, Awsān |
| Result | Sabaean victory |
| Territorial changes | Sayʿān captured by Sabaean forces |

Belligerents
| Kingdom of Sabaʾ and Dhū Raydān | Awsān |

Commanders and leaders
| As'ad Shams Asri'; Murthid Yuhahmid; Dharihan Ashwa' | Unknown Awsānite commanders |

Units involved
| Royal Sabaean Army | Awsānite forces |

Strength
| Unknown | Unknown |

Casualties and losses
| Unknown | Unknown |

The capture of Sayʿān was another recorded operation during the Sabaean advance into Awsān. The seizure of Sayʿān further reduced Awsān's ability to resist Sabaean expansion and represented another success in the wider campaign.

By capturing multiple Awsānite settlements, the Sabaean army weakened Awsān as a regional power and contributed to the collapse of the southern coalition that had opposed Sabaʾ.

== Outcome ==
The Awsān Campaign resulted in a major Sabaean victory. Awsān was severely weakened militarily and politically, while the wider southern coalition was effectively dismantled as a unified military threat.

The campaign strengthened the authority of the kings of Sabaʾ and Dhū Raydān and expanded Sabaean influence over southern Arabia. Following the conclusion of the wider campaign, Dharihan and the Sabaean kings returned safely to Maʾrib.

A dedication was later made to Almaqah at the temple of Awwam in Maʾrib, commemorating the victories achieved during the campaign and crediting divine protection throughout the conflict.
