= Ad-Dann =

Ad-Dann الدن
- Village
- Location in Yemen
- Coordinates: 14.3518°N 43.85275°E
- Country: Yemen
- Governorate: Dhamar
- District: Wusab Al Ali
- Elevation: 11,800 ft (3,600 m)
- Time zone: UTC+3 (Yemen Standard Time)

Ad-Dann (Arabic: الدن Ad-Dann), historically known as Hisn Naʽman, is a village in Wusab Al Ali District of Dhamar Governorate, Yemen. It serves as the administrative seat of the district.

== History ==
According to the 14th-century author Wajih al-Din al-Hubayshi, who documented the history of Wusab, Ad-Dann (then known as Hisn Naʽman) originated during pre-Islamic times. The Sulayhids later constructed a castle atop the ruins. The Sulayhid ruler Ali al-Sulayhi resided here for several years during the mid-11th century, expanded the castle. In 1064, he commissioned a Great Mosque in nearby Qardah, identified with modern Harurah in the territory of the Bani Shu'ayb.
