= Dharihan Ibn Murthid Ibn As'ad Shams Al Himyari =

Ancient Yemeni military commander

Dharihan Ibn Murthid
- Mukarrib Saba

Mukarrib Of Saba And Dhu-Raydan
- Predecessor: Marthad Yuhahmid
- Successor: Hirran Ibn Dharihan
- Born: Dharih
- Issue: Hirran Ibn Dharihan
Names
- Dharihan ibn Murthid Ibn as'ad shams al yafi'i al himyari
Regnal name
- Dharihan Ashwa’, Dharih Ashwa’, Dharihan Yuna’im
- Dynasty: Dynasty of Fari' Yanhab
- Dynasty: House of Ilaseros
- Father: Marthad yuhahmid
- Mother: Unknown roman concubine
- Religion: paganism
- Occupation: Military Commander
- Military career
- Allegiance: Kingdom of Sabaʾ and Dhū Raydān
- Branch: Royal Sabaean Army
- Service years: fl. 3rd century AD
- Rank: Royal Commander
- Commands: Tribal contingents of Fayṣān and Yuhbiʿil
- Conflicts: Campaign against the Southern Coalition; Battle of Radmān; Raids against hostile tribes in southern Yemen; Siege of Halzawum; Capture of Masraqitan; Awsān campaign; Fighting near Timnaʿ

Dhariḥān ibn Murthid ibn Asʿad Shams al-Yafi'i al-Himyari (ذرحان ابن مرثد ابن سعدشمس اليافعي الحميري) was a Himyarite military commander and king of ancient Yemen. He is attested to in Sabaean inscriptions as a commander of the army of Sabaʾ and is known for his role in defending the Kingdom of Sabaʾ and Dhū Raydān. Dharihan is also an ancestor of the Dharaḥin tribe.

== Lineage and Early Life ==
Dharihan was the son of Murthid, king of Sabaʾ and Dhū Raydān, and the grandson of Saʿd Shams, another Sabaean king. His full name, Dhariḥān ibn Murthid ibn Saʿd Shams al-Yāfiʿī al-Himyari, reflects his affiliation with the Yāfiʿī branch of Himyar, a major Himyarite tribal lineages.

According to al-Hamdānī and ibn al-Dayba', the Dharaḥin tribe, to which he is the eponymous ancestor of, became one of the most prominent Himyarite tribes, with subgroups including The Dharahin Al Medinah (of the inner city of juban), The Dharahin Al-Jabal Al A'la (the elevated mountain), The Dharahin (of) Yafi' and Dhu Dharihan historically settled across regions such as Hamdān, Juban, Yāfiʿ, Raymah, ʿImrān, al-Bayḍāʾ, and ʿUtmah.

== Military and Political Career ==
Dharihan appears in Himyarite–Sabaean inscriptions as a commander of the Sabaean army, serving under his father Murthid and grandfather As'ad Shams Asri'.The inscriptions describe his participation in several military expeditions undertaken by the Kingdom of Sabaʾ and Dhū Raydān against rival South Arabian kingdoms and revolting tribal confederations during the 3rd century AD.

According to the inscriptions, the Sabaean armies were victorious in these campaigns, after which Murthid and Dharihan dedicated a bronze statue to the god Almaqah at the Temple of Awwam in thanksgiving for their victories and safe return.

=== Campaign Against the Southern Coalition ===
The Ja 629 inscription records Dharihan's participation in a major military campaign undertaken by the Kingdom of Sabaʾ and Dhū Raydān against a coalition of southern Arabian kingdoms and tribes. The coalition included the kingdoms of Hadramawt, Qatabān, Radmān, Maʿāhir, Hawlān, Mḍḥym, allied tribal confederations, and Arab auxiliaries under the leadership of Yadaʿil, king of Hadramawt, Nabṭm, king of Qatabān, and Wahabʾil of Maʿāhir. The Sabaean expedition was led by Kings As'ad Shams Asri' and Murthid Yuhahmid, accompanied by the Royal Sabaean Army, Sabaean tribal contingents, the ʾqwl (tribal nobles), and contingents from the tribes of Fayṣān and Yuhbiʿil under Dharihan's command. The campaign was fought across central and southern Yemen before the victorious Sabaean army returned safely to Maʾrib.

==== Battle of Radmān ====
The first major engagement described in the inscription took place in the territory of Radmān. During the operation, Dharihan commanded troops drawn from the tribes of Fayṣān and Yuhbiʿil while operating separately from the main Sabaean army. Kings As'ad Shams Asri' and Murthid Yuhahmid marched with the Royal Sabaean Army and confronted the coalition led by Yadaʿil of Hadramawt, Nabṭm of Qatabān, Wahabʾil of Maʿāhir, and their allied forces. According to the inscription, the Sabaeans crushed and routed the army of Yadaʿil and his allies, securing a decisive victory over the coalition. Dharihan subsequently rejoined the main army as the campaign continued.

==== Raids Following the Victory ====
Following the victory at Radmān, Dharihan resumed independent military operations. The inscription states that he led soldiers, military officers, and members of the mqtt serving with the tribes of Fayṣān and Yuhbiʿil against hostile tribes, inflicting killings and capturing booty. These operations appear to have consisted primarily of raids intended to weaken enemy resistance while securing supplies and spoils for the Sabaean army. Throughout the inscription, these victories are attributed to the protection and favor of the god Almaqah.

==== Siege of Halzawum ====
The siege of Halzawum is the most detailed military operation described in Ja 629. Following the defeat of the coalition army, Dharihan campaigned alongside Kings As'ad Shams Asri' and Murthid Yuhahmid against the city of Halzawum.

The inscription records that the Sabaean army besieged and invested Halzawum while simultaneously ravaging the surrounding valleys. In addition to the siege itself, the army destroyed sanctuaries, demolished forts, ruined wells, and destroyed irrigation works in the surrounding area, inflicting significant damage upon the city's defensive, religious, and agricultural infrastructure.

==== Campaign Against Awsān ====
Following the operations at Halzawum, the Sabaean offensive continued into the territory of Awsān. The inscription records that the city of Manwabum was forced into capitulation and humiliation before describing the reduction of "all the towns and fortresses of Awsān." It further records the capture of Sayʿān, indicating that the offensive consisted of multiple operations directed against fortified Awsānite settlements rather than a single engagement.

==== Fighting Around Timnaʿ ====
The final phase of the campaign took place near Timnaʿ, the capital of Qatabān. The inscription records that Dharihan and the commander Rabbsamsum Yaʿirr attacked and pursued Hadrami forces and allied nomadic tribes that had advanced into the vicinity of Timnaʿ. Following the operation, the Sabaean army safely withdrew with the kings to Maʾrib, bringing the expedition to a successful conclusion.

==== Dedication After the Campaign ====
Following the campaign, Murthid and Dharihan dedicated a bronze statue to the god Almaqah at the Temple of Awwam in Maʾrib. The inscription credits Almaqah with protecting Dharihan throughout the expedition, granting victory over the southern coalition, enabling the capture of enemy settlements, the taking of booty, and the safe return of the Sabaean kings and their army to Maʾrib.

== Achievements and Reputation ==
Dharihan's military service and leadership secured his reputation as a capable commander of the Himyarite forces. Al-Hamdānī and al-Dayba' record that his leadership helped strengthen the position of the Yāfiʿī line within Himyarite politics and contributed to the cohesion of the Dharaḥin tribal confederation.

His legacy is preserved in both Himyarite inscriptions and later historical accounts.

== Significance and Legacy ==
people who decend from Dharihan take the nisbah Al-Dharihani (alt spellings: aldharihani, dharihani, aldharhani, dharhani, altharhani, altharihani, tharhani) (arabic spelling: الذرحاني)

The Dharaḥin tribe, descended from Dharihan, remained influential in Yemeni history. They included the tribes of Dhariḥn, Dhariḥān, and Dhū Dhariḥān, prominent in multiple regions of Yemen.

From this lineage came the Banū Ṭāhir al-Dharaḥānī, rulers during the Ṭāhirid state in the 9th and 10th centuries AH.

Further more he is also the ancestor of the famous shafi'i jurist and scholar Imam Abdullah ʻAfīf al-Dīn ʻAbdallāh ibn Asʿad al-Yāfiʿī and from him the Afifi Dynasty of lower Yafi'.
