= Abdullah al-Baradouni =

Yemeni poet and writer (1929–1999)

- Born: 1929; Al Hada, Dhamar, Kingdom of Yemen
- Died: 30 August 1999 (aged 69–70); Sanaa, Yemen
- Occupations: Poet, writer, critic

Abdullah al-Baradouni (Arabic: عبدالله البردوني; 1929 – 30 August 1999) was a Yemeni writer, poet and critic. He published 12 poetry books as well as six other books on topics such as politics, folklore, and literature. He is considered Yemen's most famous poet.

== Early life ==
Al-Baradouni was born on 1929 in Zaraja in Al Hada district, and grew up in Dhamar Governorate, Yemen. He contracted smallpox at the age of five, leading him to completely lose his eyesight by the age of six. He began school in his village at the age of seven, and two years later moved to Dhamar city where he enrolled at the Shamsia School. When he was 13 years old, he simultaneously started reading old poetry and writing his own. As an adolescent, he satirized the Imamate in some of his poems which he circulated in secret, and in 1948 was arrested and thrown into prison for nine months. He moved to Sanaa before he was 20, after his release. He studied in its Grand Mosque, then moved to Dar Al-Ulum at the beginning of 1940 to study poetry and language. He graduated from Dar al-Ulum with distinction and a certificate in Islamic law and Arabic language sciences. After graduation, he became a teacher at Dar Al-Ulum. From 1954 to 1956, he practiced law, especially arguing the cases of divorced women, earning himself the name "the divorcees' lawyer."

== Literary career ==
After the 1962 revolution, he started working for Sanaa Radio, where he became a manager in 1969 and, later, head of the programs until 1980. He continued preparing a rich literature program called "Magazine of Thought and Literature" each week until his death in 1999. He worked as a supervisor for the army magazine from 1969 until 1975 and had a weekly article each week entitled "Thought and Literature Issues" and a weekly article in Al-Thawra newspaper entitled "Cultural Issues." He was one of the first people to call for the creation of the Union for Yemeni Authors and Men of Letters and was voted in as its first chairman.

Al-Baradoni, as described by most critics, contributed to the rising of the Arabic poem along with a few great poets. However, most of his works were not published during his life.

== Beliefs ==
He advocated democracy and women's rights. He wrote poems critical of the government and the revolutionaries that overthrew them, which led to his imprisonment in the 1950s, 60s, and 70s.

== Death ==
Al-Baradouni died of heart attack on 30 August 1999. "The great poet Abdullah Al-Baradoni's passing away has left a great vacuum in the arena of poetry," said Dr. Abdulaziz Al-Maqaleh, an advisor to the president and director of the Yemen Center for Studies and Research. "This vacuum can be filled only by his works, which were and will remain the subject of unlimited interest for coming generations in Yemen," he said. "This generation has lagged far behind the field of literary and creativity." Minister of Culture, Mohammad Abu Bakr Al-Muflehi said that Al-Baradoni is one of the most important symbols of global culture in the second half of the 20th century. "He is one of those people who raised the name of Yemen in the Arab and international forums," said Al-Muflehi. "Yemen now has a prominent location on the map of Arab culture.""At the end of each August, we remember how death has taken our poet, philosopher, and thinker," he said. "He took it upon himself to upgrade, develop, and renovate Arab poetry to become one of its best- known poets," he said.

== Bibliography ==
=== Famous poetry collections ===
- From the Land of Sheba
- On the Path of Dawn
- The City of Tomorrow
- Journey to the Green Days
- Smokey Faces in Night Mirrors
- The Quality of Time, Creatures of the Second Nostalgia
- The Fluidity of Light, Answer to the Ages
- The Return of Wiseman Ben Zaid.

=== Non-Fiction ===
- A Journey in Modern and Ancient Yemen poetry
- Yemeni issues
- Popular culture in Yemen
- Yemeni Experience and Sayings
- Culture and the Yemeni revolution
- From the First Poem to the Last Bullet: A Poetic Study of Zubairi Poetry and his Life.

== See also ==
- Abdulaziz Al-Maqaleh
