= Abu al-Fadhl Ahmad Mohammed al-Saadi =

Yemeni politician and government official

- أبو الفضل أحمد محمد الصعدي
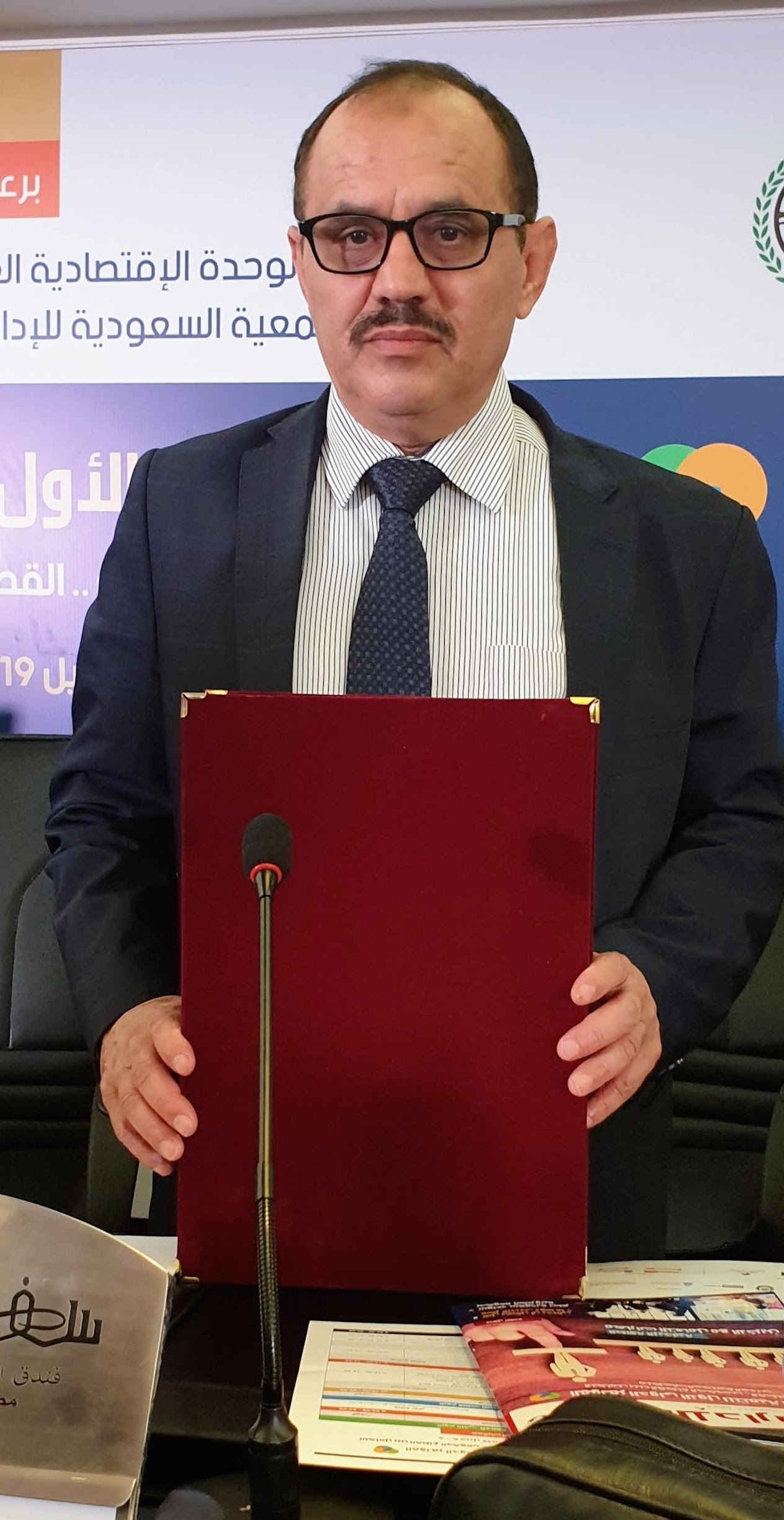

Assistant Secretary-General of the Council of Ministers of Yemen
- In office 2016 – 12 January 2026

Personal details
- Born: 1 January 1966 Al Jawn, As Salafiyah District, Raymah Governorate, Yemen
- Died: 12 January 2026 (aged 60) Netherlands
- Education: Sana'a University
- Occupation: Politician, government official and police officer

Military service
- Rank: Brigadier

Abu al-Fadhl Ahmad Mohammed al-Saadi (1 January 1966 – 12 January 2026) was a Yemeni government official and police officer who served as Assistant Secretary-General of the Cabinet of Yemen from 2016 until his death.

== Early life and education ==
Al-Saadi was born in 1966 in Al Jawn, Raymah Governorate, Yemen. He studied at Al-Noor Scientific Institute in Al Hudaydah and later completed higher education at Sana'a University.

== Career ==
Al-Saadi held several administrative and government positions. In 2005, he was elected as a member of the Local Council of Raymah Governorate and later served as Secretary-General of the Raymah Governorate Local Council.

In 2010, he was appointed Deputy Undersecretary of the Ministry of Local Administration.

In 2016, Al-Saadi was appointed Assistant Secretary-General of the Cabinet of Yemen, a position he held until his death in 2026.

== Death ==
Al-Saadi died on 12 January 2026 in the Netherlands.
