= Wusab Al Ali district =

Wusab Al Ali District
- District
- Interactive map of Wusab Al Ali District
- Coordinates: 14.3342°N 43.7944°E
- Country: Yemen
- Governorate: Dhamar
- Seat: Ad-Dann

Population (2003)
  - Total: 164,223
- Time zone: UTC+3 (Yemen Standard Time)

Wusab Al Ali District is a district of the Dhamar Governorate, Yemen. As of 2003, the district had a population of 164,223 inhabitants. It is one of the largest districts of Dhamar Governorate, covering an area of 592 square kilometers, and is characterized by high mountains. As of 2019, it has a population of 275,137. It is part of the historical and geographical region of Wusab.

== Divisions ==
Wusab Al Ali contains 850 villages and is divided into 9 makhalif, which are further subdivided into 73 subdistricts. An incomplete list of them is below:

1. Al-Jabjab
  1. Ajbar Sawafil
  2. Ajbar 'Awali
  3. Al-Shurka' (aka al-Shuraka')
  4. Al-Manarah
  5. Bilad as-Sidh (aka Bilad al-Sadah)
  6. 'Araf
  7. Yaris
2. Al-Qayima
  1. Al-Bayadi'
  2. Az-Zahir
  3. Al-Kalbiyin al-Janubi
  4. Al-Mahajir
  5. Bani an-Namar
  6. Bani Shunayf (aka Bani Shanif)
  7. Jabal Mathan (aka Jabal Matahan)
  8. Sinwah (aka Sanuh)
  9. Zafran
  10. Ghaythan
3. Bani Muslim
  1. Ad-Dayadir
  2. As-Sulul
  3. Al-Marba'ah (aka al-Muraba'ah)
  4. Qa'idah
  5. Kalah wa al-Ahyam
4. Bani al-Hadad
  1. Al-Asluh
  2. Al-Jarani
  3. Al-Rawdah
  4. Al-'Utb (aka al-Utab)
  5. Al-Kalbiyin
  6. Al-Hijrah (aka al-Hijarah)
  7. Dhalaf
5. Bani Shu'ayb
  1. Al-Jadalah
  2. Ash-Sharqi
  3. Al-'Aynayn
  4. Al-Qawati
  5. Al-Muwassatah
  6. Al-Hatari
  7. Dhi Hamad
  8. Zahr (aka Zahar)
  9. Qashat Rima'
  10. Mihzar (aka Mahzir)
6. Ju'r
  1. As-Sayf
  2. Al-Shiraqi
  3. Al-Gharbi as-Safil
  4. Al-Gharbi al-'Ali
  5. Bani Kandah (aka Banu Kanadah)
  6. Habr (aka Habar)
  7. Khadman
  8. Sharqi Ja'r
  9. Mugharram al-Wasat
7. Kabud
  1. Al-Ajbar
  2. Al-Ghawl
  3. Zajid
  4. Saban wa ar-Raq'i
  5. Shajab
  6. Sharqi Kabud
  7. Gharbi Kabud
8. Naqadh
  1. Al-Athluth
  2. Al-Aj'ud
  3. As-Sunnah (aka al-Sanah)
  4. Ash-Shawka' (aka al-Shuwaka')
  5. Bani al-Masnaf
  6. Bani Rabi'ah
  7. Humayr
