= Jabal Ash sharq district =

Coordinates: 14.7294°N 43.9061°E

Jabal Ash sharq District
- District
- Interactive map of Jabal Ash sharq District
- Country: Yemen
- Governorate: Dhamar

Population (2003)
  - Total: 62,034
- Time zone: UTC+3 (Yemen Standard Time)

Jabal Ash sharq District is a district of the Dhamar Governorate, Yemen. As of 2003, the district had a population of 62,034 inhabitants.
