= Jahran district =

Coordinates: 14.7331°N 44.3142°E

Jahran District
- District
- Interactive map of Jahran District
- Country: Yemen
- Governorate: Dhamar
- Seat: Maʽbar

Population (2003)
  - Total: 86,590
- Time zone: UTC+3 (Yemen Standard Time)

Jahran District is a district of the Dhamar Governorate, Yemen. As of 2003, the district had a population of 86,590 inhabitants.
