= Wusab As Safil district =

Wusab As Safil District
- District
- Location within Yemen
- Coordinates: 14°26′N 43°45′E
- Country: Yemen
- Governorate: Dhamar

Population (2003)
  - Total: 149,531
- Time zone: UTC+3 (Yemen Standard Time)

Wusab As Safil District is a district of the Dhamar Governorate, Yemen. As of 2003, the district had a population of 149,531 inhabitants. It is part of the historical and geographical region of Wusab.

It's estimated that the population in Wusab As Safil District would be 248,419 in 2023 by Central Statistical Organization (Yemen).
