= Mayfa'at Anss district =

Mayfa'at Anss District مديرية ميفعة عنس
- District
- Interactive map of Mayfa'at Anss District
- Coordinates: 14.5150°N 44.6106°E
- Country: Yemen
- Governorate: Dhamar

Population (2003)
  - Total: 60,854
- Time zone: UTC+3 (Yemen Standard Time)

Mayfa'at 'Anss District is a district of the Dhamar Governorate, Yemen. As of 2003, the district had a population of 60,854 inhabitants.
