= Wahunkoha =

Coordinates: 7°13′N 80°35′E

Wahunkoha වහුන්ග්කොහ வஹுங்கொஹ Wahanga
- Village
- Interactive map of Wahunkoha
- Country: Sri Lanka
- Postal code: Handessa
- Divisional Secretariat: Udunuwara
- District: Kandy District
- Province: Central Province
- Time zone: UTC+5:30 (Sri Lanka Standard Time)

Wahunkoha (Sinhala: වහුන්ග්කොහ, Tamil: வஹுங்கொஹ) is a village in Sri Lanka. It is located in the Central Province in Udunuwara electorate.

== See also ==
- List of towns in Central Province, Sri Lanka
