= Dawran Aness district =

Coordinates: 14.8286°N 44.1142°E

Dawran Aness District ضوران آنس
- District
- Interactive map of Dawran Aness District
- Country: Yemen
- Governorate: Dhamar

Population (2003)
  - Total: 121,553
- Time zone: UTC+3 (Yemen Standard Time)

Dawran Aness District (Arabic: مديرية ضوران آنس) is a district of the Dhamar Governorate, Yemen. As of 2003, the district had a population of 121,553 inhabitants.
