= Al Jafariyah district =

Al Jafariyah District
- District
- Location in Yemen
- Coordinates: 14.5194°N 43.5817°E
- Country: Yemen
- Governorate: Raymah

Population (2003)
  - Total: 69,705
- Time zone: UTC+3 (Yemen Standard Time)

Al Jafariyah District is a district of the Raymah Governorate, Yemen. As of 2003, the district had a population of 69,705 inhabitants.
