= Kusmah district =

Coordinates: 14°35′N 43°40′E

Kusmah District
- District
- Interactive map of Kusmah District
- Country: Yemen
- Governorate: Raymah

Population (2003)
  - Total: 74,622
- Time zone: UTC+3 (Yemen Standard Time)

Kusmah District is a district of the Raymah Governorate, Yemen. As of 2003, the district had a population of 74,622 inhabitants.
