= Maghirib Ans district =

Maghirib Ans District
- District
- Interactive map of Maghirib Ans District
- Country: Yemen
- Governorate: Dhamar

Population (2003)
  - Total: 53,261
- Time zone: UTC+3 (Yemen Standard Time)

Maghirib Ans District is a district of the Dhamar Governorate, Yemen. As of 2003, the district had a population of 53,261 inhabitants.
