= Ahmad Abd Al Rahman Al Moulami =

Yemeni writer

- Born: 1917; Utmah, Dhamar
- Died: 2004 (aged 86–87)

Ahmed Abd Al Rahman Al Moulami (Arabic: أحمد عبد الرحمن المعلّمي) (2004–1917) was a Yemeni writer, born in Utmah, in the Dhamar Governorate, currently. He was a member of the Poetry Society of the Arab Writers Union in Syria, and a member of the Yemeni Writers Union. He received his first education in his village. He memorized the linguistic and jurisprudential text and then moved to Irian village, and learned from its scholars, then moved to Sanaa, where he attended the science and literature councils. He served as ambassador of Yemen to Egypt, then ambassador of Yemen to the State of Ethiopia. He was politically active in opposing hukm al'ayima and supported the revolutionaries, which exposed him to imprisonment twice for eight years and had to flee to Egypt for a period until the declaration of the establishment of the Republic of Yemen in 1962 and the outbreak of the North Yemen Civil War.

He has a number of printed collection of poems: "The Cartoon Lion" in 1968, "Earthquakes in the Land of Bilqis" in 1982, "Hadeeth Al-Sunun" – 1994, "Yemen Al Uruba" – 1996, "Love Poems" - 1996, and "Mahattaat Shieria" – 2000, and "Tears of Albayan" – 2000, and he has poems in both collections "Echo of the Years" and "With My Grandson in 2000" in association with other authors.

== Works ==
He has published several literary works, including:

- Al-Mutawakkiliya Sharia, Aden, 1955.
- The Cartoon Lion, Sanaa, 1969.
- Echo of Nostalgia (Poetry), Beirut.
- Earthquakes in the Land of Bilqis, Damascus, 1983.
- Criticism and poetry from Hajja prisons, Damascus, 1984.
- A horrific nightmare, Damascus.
- Sarcastic Stories, Beirut: Dar Maktabat Al-Hayat, 1986.
- The Egyptian Revolution in Yemeni Literature: Poems by a Group of Yemeni Poets in Hajjah Prisons, Modern Era Publications, Beirut, 1987.
- The Wife and the Lover, Beirut, 1987.
- Love Poems.
- Yemen Al Uruba
- A book on the edifice of Yemeni unity.
- A message against injustice and confiscation of citizens' money.
- Hadith of the Years, presented by: Abd Al-Qader Al-Hosni, Damascus, 1994.
- The Khat in Yemeni Literature and Islamic Jurisprudence, Dar Maktabat Al-Hayat, Beirut, 1988.
- The martyr of the homeland, the judge, the scholar Abdullah bin Mohammed bin Yahya Al-Eryani, Dar Al-Awda, Damascus, 1990.
- From Beirut to Hadhramaut: A Sociopolitical Biography, Damascus, 1993.
- The Two Leaders, Al-Zubayri and Numan: A Struggle Biography and Documented National and Nationalism talks, Damascus, 1997.
- Slaughters and Shackles: Memoirs from Hajjah Prisons, Damascus, 1998.
- The two friends, Al-Eryani and Al Moulami on the Path of Struggle, Ikrima Press, Damascus, 1999.
- With my grandson in 2000, Sanaa: The General Book Authority, 2003.

=== Investigation and preparation ===
- An epic from the prisons of Hajjah, Abd Al-Rahman bin Yahya Al-Eryani, explained and corrected by Ahmad Abd al-Rahman al-Moulami, 1981.
- Al-fawayid Al-majmueah fi Al'ahadith Almawduea, Mohammed bin Ali Al-Shawkani; Investigated by Abd Al-Rahman bin Yahya Al Moulami Al-Yamani, Library of the Mohammediyah Sunnah, 1960.
- Judge Al-Hjjah Mohammed bin Yahya bin Mohammed Al-Eryani, authored by Lotf bin Mohammed Al-Eryani, investigated and prepared by Ahmed Abd Al-Rahman Al Moulami, 1996.
- 'iithaf Al'ahbab Bi-dimyat Alqasr: the description of Mahasin some of the people of the age, written by Ahmed bin Mohammed bin Abd Al Hadi Qatin Al-Hababi Al-Maqhafi, presented and investigated by Abd Al Rahman bin Abd Al Qadir Al Moulami, Al-Irshad Library, Sanaa, 2008.
- Diwan Umāra Al-Yamani, written by: Abd Al Rahman Yahya Al-Eryani and Ahmed Abd Al Rahman Al Moulami, Ikrima Press, Damascus.
