= Mazhar district =

Coordinates: 14°30′N 43°45′E

Mazhar District مديرية مزهر
- District
- Interactive map of Mazhar District
- Country: Yemen
- Governorate: Raymah

Population (2003)
  - Total: 64,661
- Time zone: UTC+3 (Yemen Standard Time)

Mazhar District (Arabic: مديرية مزهر) is a district of the Raymah Governorate, Yemen. As of 2003, the district had a population of 64,661 inhabitants.
