= Bilad At Ta'am district =

Coordinates: 14°40′N 43°35′E

Bilad At Ta'am District
- District
- Interactive map of Bilad At Ta'am District
- Country: Yemen
- Governorate: Raymah

Population (2003)
  - Total: 31,143
- Time zone: UTC+3 (Yemen Standard Time)

Bilad At Ta'am District is a district of the Raymah Governorate, Yemen. As of 2003, the district had a population of 31,143 inhabitants.
