= Wusab =

Region of Yemen

Wusab is a historical and geographical region of Yemen, currently represented by the two districts of Wusab al-ʽAli and Wusab as-Safil in Dhamar Governorate.

== History ==
Wusab has a long history stretching back into the pre-Islamic era. The main town was ʽArkabah; according to Wajih al-Din al-Hubayshi (d.1380), who wrote about the history of Wusab, the people of ʽArkabah had been Christians before the arrival of Islam, and "then they converted to Islam of their own free will." Another important town in pre-Islamic times was Dhi Jabbah, to the west of Hisn Juʽr. Al-Hubayshi wrote that Dhi Jurrah had been surrounded by high walls and was built around a gushing spring. Above all, it was famous for its markets: in pre-Islamic times, caravans had come there from all over Yemen, and even after the town fell it remained a stopping place for caravans. Al-Hubayshi also mentioned two more pre-Islamic towns in Wusab: al-Ziraʽi, between Juʽr and Zafiran, and al-Safyan, near Juʽr. Other places said to date back to pre-Islamic times include Hisn Naʽman (now called ad-Dann) and Hisn ʽUtumah. According to tradition, as related by al-Hubayshi, the area was ruled by the Shurayhiyun, a subtribe of Himyar, during the pre-Islamic period; the 10th-century writer al-Hamdani wrote that their descendants briefly ruled the Tihama during the 9th century. After that, however, Wusab was generally ruled by the dynasties that ruled Zabid.

The 13th-century writer Yaqut al-Hamawi characterized Wusab as "a mountain near Zabid in Yemen with a series of towns, provinces, and castles. The inhabitants are disrespectful and only display obedience to the sultan of Yemen with threatened with violence." He defined its extent as including the mountains of Jabal Naʽman, Jabal Juʽr, and Jabal ʽUtumah. The Sulayhid dynasty ruler Ali al-Sulayhi resided at ad-Dann for a few years in the mid-11th century, expanding the local castle and commissioning a Great Mosque at Qardah (identified with modern Harurah) in 1064. Wusab appears to have prospered under the Rasulid dynasty; during the fourteenth century, the first major wave of building activity took place, with many new mosques being commissioned. (Note: This is known both from historical documents as well as from inscriptions found in the mosques themselves, mostly on the ceilings.)

During the early 20th century, under the Mutawakkilite Kingdom of Yemen, the governor of Wusab was Muhammad al-Wazir (b. 1887), who was a member of the powerful al-Wazir family.

== Architecture ==
Wusab's mosques, which mostly date from the 14th century, are typically small, cube-shaped, and windowless. The archetypical Wusab mosque is supported by two rows of columns, while smaller mosques have only one or two columns instead. The ceilings are wooden and either flat or coffered, and are often painted with decorative motifs and inscribed with verses from the Qur'an. The decoration on the ceilings consists of a patchwork of ceiling boards, each with its own design. Star-shaped blossoms, interlace patterns, and rosettes are all commonly used. The decorative motifs resemble those used in Ethiopian church architecture, and may represent a continuation of decorative styles used in the religious buildings of Wusab's Christian population during late antiquity, with the pre-Islamic buildings either being converted into mosques or serving as models for newly built mosques. Apart from the ceiling decorations, the mosques' interiors are mostly undecorated, with simple whitewashed walls. Local tradition holds that many of the mosques were originally built with the qibla facing Jerusalem rather than Mecca, although this is difficult to verify because both are to the north.
