= Siege of Halzawum =

Military operation

- Part of Campaign against the Southern Coalition
Date	c. 3rd century AD
Location	Halzawum and Masraqitan, ancient Yemen
Result	Sabaean victory

Belligerents
Kingdom of Sabaʾ and Dhū Raydān	Southern coalition

Commanders and leaders
Asʿadshams Asri'; Marthad Yuhahmid Ibn As'adShams; Dhariḥān ibn Murthid	Unknown

Strength
Forces of Sabaʾ: Troops of Fayṣān; Troops of Yuhbiʿil; Royal army of Asʿadshams and Murthid	Forces of Halzawum and Masraqitan: Members of the southern coalition

Casualties and losses
Unknown	Unknown; Halzawum troops destroyed and city occupied

The Siege of Halzawum was a major military operation conducted by the Kingdom of Sabaʾ and Dhū Raydān during the reign of King Asʿadshams Asri and the military career of the Sabaean commander Dhariḥān ibn Murthid. The siege is recorded in the Sabaean inscription Ja 629, which describes the continuation of a major campaign against a coalition of southern Arabian powers.

== Background ==
Following the Sabaean victory at the Battle of Radmān, the Sabaean army continued its advance against the remaining members of the southern coalition. Dhariḥān ibn Murthid, who had already distinguished himself as a military commander during the fighting at Radmān, continued to lead forces alongside Kings Saʿdshamsum and Murthid.

The campaign moved deeper into enemy territory, targeting fortified settlements and centers of political and economic importance. Among these were the cities of Halzawum and Masraqitan.

== Siege ==
The Sabaean forces besieged the city of Halzawum as part of their wider offensive. The inscription describes the army attacking the settlement and conducting operations throughout the surrounding region.

The campaign was not limited to direct military confrontation. According to the inscription, the Sabaean army devastated the surrounding territory by:

- plundering valleys,
- destroying temples,
- demolishing palaces,
- damaging wells,
- destroying irrigation canals.

These actions weakened the economic and administrative foundations of the opposing territory and demonstrated the scale of the Sabaean campaign.

== Operations at Masraqitan ==
Alongside Halzawum, the inscription records operations against Masraqitan. These actions formed part of the wider Sabaean effort to defeat the coalition and remove opposition to Sabaean authority in southern Arabia.

== Aftermath ==
Following the siege of Halzawum, the Sabaean army continued its campaign against additional coalition territories, including operations against Awsān and the region surrounding Timnaʿ.

The campaign was later commemorated through a dedication to Almaqah at the temple of Awwam in Maʾrib, where Murthid and Dhariḥān credited divine protection for the victories achieved during the war.
