= Al Manar district =

Al Manar District مدرية ال منر
- District
- Location in Yemen
- Coordinates: 14°40′N 44°15′E
- Country: Yemen
- Governorate: Dhamar

Population (2003)
  - Total: 49,390
- Time zone: UTC+3 (Yemen Standard Time)

Al Manar District is a district of the Dhamar Governorate, Yemen. As of 2003, the district had a population of 49,390 inhabitants.
