= As Salafiyah district =

Coordinates: 14.6864°N 43.8214°E

Al Salfiyah District
- District
- Interactive map of Al Salfiyah District
- Country: Yemen
- Governorate: Raymah

Population (2003)
  - Total: 82,570
- Time zone: UTC+3 (Yemen Standard Time)

As Salfiyah District is a district of the Raymah Governorate, Yemen. As of 2003, the district had a population of 82,570 inhabitants.
