= Al-Manar (Ibb) =

Al-Manar المنار
- Sub-district
- Location in Yemen
- Coordinates: 14°03′24″N 44°16′27″E
- Country: Yemen
- Governorate: Ibb Governorate
- District: Ba'dan District

Population (2004)
  - Total: 11,369
- Time zone: UTC+3

Al-Manar (Arabic: المنار) is a sub-district located in Ba'dan District, Ibb Governorate, Yemen. Al-Manar had a population of 11369 as of 2004.
