= Abdulaziz al-Maqaleh =

Yemeni poet and writer (1937–2022)

- عبد العزيز المقالح
- Born: 1937; Maqaleh, An Nadirah District, Ibb, Kingdom of Yemen
- Died: 28 November 2022 (aged 85); Sana'a, Yemen
- Education: Ain Shams University
- Occupations: Poet, writer, critic

Abdul Aziz al-Maqaleh (Arabic: عبد العزيز المقالح; 1937 – 28 November 2022) was a Yemeni poet and writer. Primarily writing in free verse, al-Maqaleh has been described as Yemen's "best-known and most-laureled twentieth-century poet."

== Life and career ==
Al-Maqaleh was born in 1937 in the village of Maqaleh in Ibb Governorate.

As a young man, al-Maqaleh had Baathist sympathies, and was a supporter of the 1962 revolution that overthrew Yemen's Imamate. On 26 September 1962, he read a statement broadcast on Radio Sana'a announcing the revolution.

Al-Maqaleh graduated from university in 1970 with a Bachelor of Arts degree. He then received a master's in 1973 and a PhD in 1977, both from Ain Shams University in Cairo, Egypt. He was reportedly expelled from Egypt by Egyptian president Anwar Sadat, after expressing opposition to the Camp David Accords. He spent the rest of his life in Sanaa, leaving the city just once between his return from Egypt in 1978 and his death in 2022.

From 1982 to 2001, al-Maqaleh served as the President of Sana'a University, and then as the head of the Yemeni Center for Research and Studies, Sanaa. He was associated with Yemeni political leaders including former President Ali Abdullah Saleh and former prime ministers Abdul Aziz Abdul Ghani and Abd Al-Karim Al-Iryani, and frequently read his poetry at official ceremonies. In 2001, he was nominated to serve as the cultural adviser to the president, and played a key role in appointing ministers of education and culture, and university presidents.

In addition to his poetry, al-Maqaleh also wrote a weekly column for al-Thawra newspaper, and hosted a weekly literary salon.

Al-Maqaleh died in Sana'a on 28 November 2022, at the age of 85.

== Literary style and themes ==
Al-Maqaleh wrote 34 books, including poetry, history, and literary criticism. He was regarded as being one of the first modernist Yemeni poets, and wrote in free verse. Previously, poetry in Yemen had been primarily oral and relied heavily on the themes and styles of ancient Arabic poetry.

His work was often criticized by religious radicals who accused him of atheism and tried to excommunicate him, citing a controversial line from one of his poems: "Allah has become silent ash, a terror in the hands of executioners, a field that sprouts prayer beads and turbans." The poet's defenders pointed to other poems he wrote, such as "A Letter on Allah" (1961), as evidence of his faith.

His 1998 book of poetry, The Alphabet of the Soul, contained Sufi themes, while his subsequent series of books (The Book of Friends, The Book of Sana'a, The Book of Cities, The Book of Mothers and The Book of Love) juxtaposed poetry and prose.

Several of his poems addressed Yemen's 2011 uprisings and the subsequent civil war. His 2011 poem, "The Betrayal," dealt with the Yemeni government's massacre of dozens of protesters in Sanaa on March 18, during the Arab Spring. According to Stephen Day, the poem expresses regret for "the younger generation’s betrayal by an older generation of revolutionary republican elites," such as al-Maqaleh himself. Later poems, "A Lamentation for 2016" and "War" (2017), described the effects of famine and conflict on Yemen.

== List of works ==
=== Selected Poetry ===
- Sana'a By All Means (Ar: لا بد من صنعاء), 1971
- Marib Speaks (in collaboration with Ambassador Abdu Othman), 1972
- A Letter to Saif bin Dhi Yazan, 1973
- Yemeni Footnotes On the Alienation of Ibn Zreik al-Baghdadi, 1974
- The Return of Waddah Yemen, 1976
- Writing with the Rebellious Sword of Ali bin al-Fadl, 1978
- Exit from the Circles of the Hour of Sulaiman, 1981
- Papers of a Body Returning from Death, 1986
- Alphabet of the Soul, 1998
- The Book of Sana'a, 1999
- The Book of the Village, 2000
- The Book of Friends, 2002
- The Book of Bilqis and Poems to the Waters of Grief, 2004
- The Book of Cities, 2005
- Literary and Intellectual Studies (translated), 2005
- Near Tagore Garden, 2018

=== Selected literature studies and works of criticism ===
- A Reading of Contemporary Yemeni Literature, 1977
- Colloquial Poetry in Yemen, 1978
- Poets from Yemen
- Yemeni Diaries in Literature and Art
- Al-Zubairy: The Inner National and Cultural Voice of Yemen, 1980
- Inscriptions of Marib
- Substantive and Technical Dimensions of the Contemporary Poetry Movement in Yemen
- Voices from the New Era
- A Reading of Zaidi and Mu'tazilite Books
- The Crisis of the Arabic Poem: A Project of Contemplation (1981)
- Abdul Nasser and Yemen: Chapters from Yemen's Revolution (Dar al-Hadatha, Beirut, 1986)
- Southern Beginnings (Dar al-Hadatha, Beirut, 1986)
- The Fundamentals of Literary Criticism in Yemen
- Theatre Beginnings in Yemen
- The Convergence of Parties: A Preliminary Reading of Literature from the Maghreb
- Studies on the Novel and Short Story in Yemen
- From the Stanza to the Poem: A Study of Yemen’s New Poetry
- A Study on Intifada Poems
- The Shock of Stones
- Poetry: Between Vision and Form
- From Whimpers to Revolution
- Writings on the Arab Winter of Literature

== Awards ==
- Lotus Award, 1986
- Order of Arts and Letters, Aden, 1980
- Order of Arts and Letters, Sanaa, 1982
- Sharjah Prize for Arab Culture, in collaboration with UNESCO, Paris, 2002
- Knight Award of the first degree in literature and arts from the French Government, 2003
- Arab Culture Award, Arab Organization for Education, Culture and Science, 2004
- Al Owais Award, 2008-09

== See also ==
- Abdullah Al-Baradouni
