= Battle of Radmān =

Military engagement recorded in an ancient Sabaean inscription

- Part of Campaign against the Southern Coalition
| Date | c. 3rd century AD |
| Location | Radmān, ancient Yemen |
| Result | Sabaean victory |

Belligerents
| Kingdom of Sabaʾ and Dhū Raydān | Southern coalition |

Commanders and leaders
| As'ad shams Asri'; Murthid Yuhahmid Ibn As'ad Shams; Dhariḥān ibn Murthid ibn Asʿad Shams | Yadaʿil of Hadramawt; Nabatum of Qataban; Wahabʾil of Maʿāhir |

Units involved
| Royal Sabaean army Fayṣān and Yuhbiʿil contingents | Coalition forces of Hadramawt, Qataban, Radmān, Maʿāhir and allies |

The Battle of Radmān is a modern designation for a military engagement recorded in the Sabaean inscription Ja 629 from Maḥram Bilqīs, Maʾrib. The battle formed part of a wider campaign fought by the Kingdom of Sabaʾ and Dhū Raydān against a coalition of southern Arabian kingdoms and tribes during the 3rd century AD.

== Background ==
The conflict began when a large coalition consisting of forces from Hadramawt, Qataban, Radmān, Maʿāhir, Hawlān, and allied tribes united against Sabaʾ under the leadership of Wahabʾil of Maʿāhir. The Sabaean king Saʿdshamsum and his son Murthid organized a military response, with the commander Dharihan ibn Murthid leading tribal contingents from Fayṣān and Yuhbiʿil.

== Battle ==
According to Ja 629, Dharihan operated separately from the main Sabaean army in the region of Radmān. During the fighting, his forces became isolated and surrounded by the opposing coalition. The inscription records that Asʿadshams and Murthid marched with the royal army to Radmān, relieving Dharihan and joining the battle against the coalition forces.

The Sabaean forces then attacked the armies of Yadaʿil of Hadramawt, Nabatum of Qataban, Wahabʾil of Maʿāhir, and their allies. The inscription states that the expeditionary force was defeated, using language describing the enemy as being "crushed and chained," indicating a major victory and the capture of prisoners.

== Aftermath ==
Following the victory at Radmān, Dharihan continued military operations against hostile tribes and participated in further campaigns against territories associated with the anti-Sabaean coalition, including operations at Halzawum, Awsān, and Timnaʿ.

The victory was commemorated through a dedication to the god Almaqah at the temple of Awwam in Maʾrib by Murthid and Dharihan, thanking the deity for protection and success during the campaign.

== See also ==
- Kingdom of Saba
- Dharihan ibn Murthid
- Sabaean inscriptions
- Ancient Yemen

== Bibliography ==
- Jam, A. H.; Phillips, W. (1964). Musnad Inscriptions from Maḥram Bilqīs, Maʾrib.
