= Al Hada district =

al-Ḥada district الحداء
- District
- Location in Yemen
- Coordinates: 14.8075°N 44.5678°E
- Country: Yemen
- Governorate: Dhamar

Population (2003)
  - Total: 143,100
- Time zone: UTC+3 (Yemen Standard Time)

al-Ḥada district (Arabic: مديرية الحداء) is a district of the Dhamar Governorate, Yemen. As of 2003, the district had a population of 143,100 inhabitants.
