= Utmah district =

Utmah District
- District
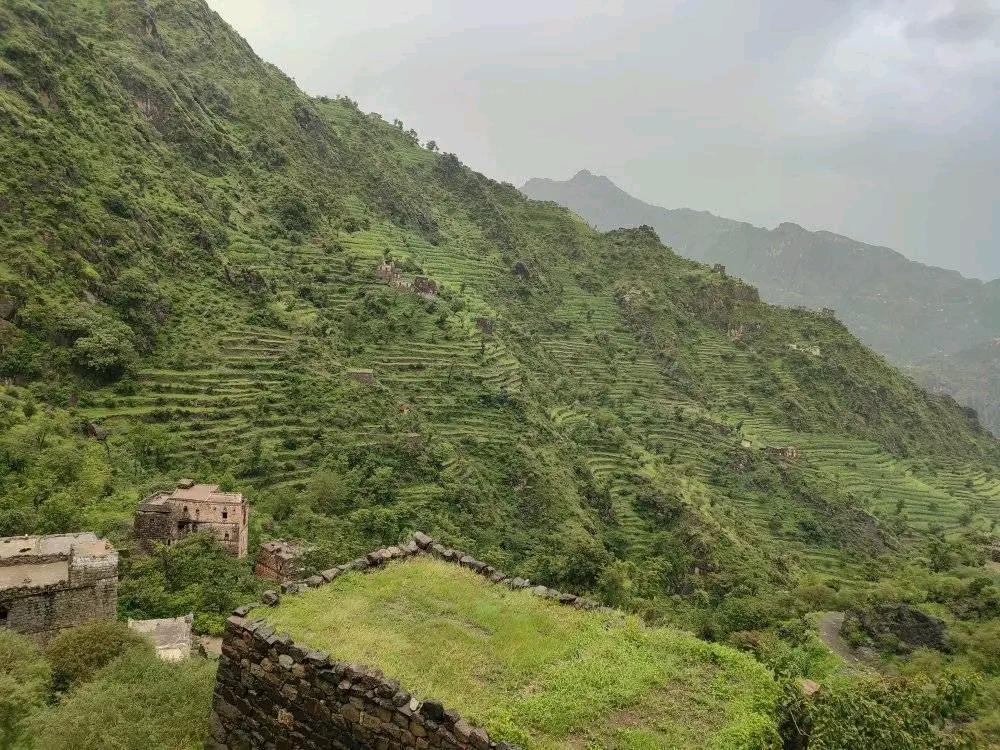
- Interactive map of Utmah District
- Coordinates: 14.4736°N 43.9481°E
- Country: Yemen
- Governorate: Dhamar

Population (2003)
  - Total: 145,284
- Time zone: UTC+3 (Yemen Standard Time)

Utmah District is a district of the Dhamar Governorate, Yemen. As of 2003, the district had a population of 145,284 inhabitants.

== Notable people ==
- Ahmad Abd Al Rahman Al Moulami (1917-2004), writer
