= Boowelikada =

Village in Kandy District, Sri Lanka

Coordinates: 7°09′N 80°29′E

Boowelikada is a village under Udunuwara AGA division in central province of Kandy District, Sri Lanka.
