= Al Jabin district =

Al Jabin District
- District
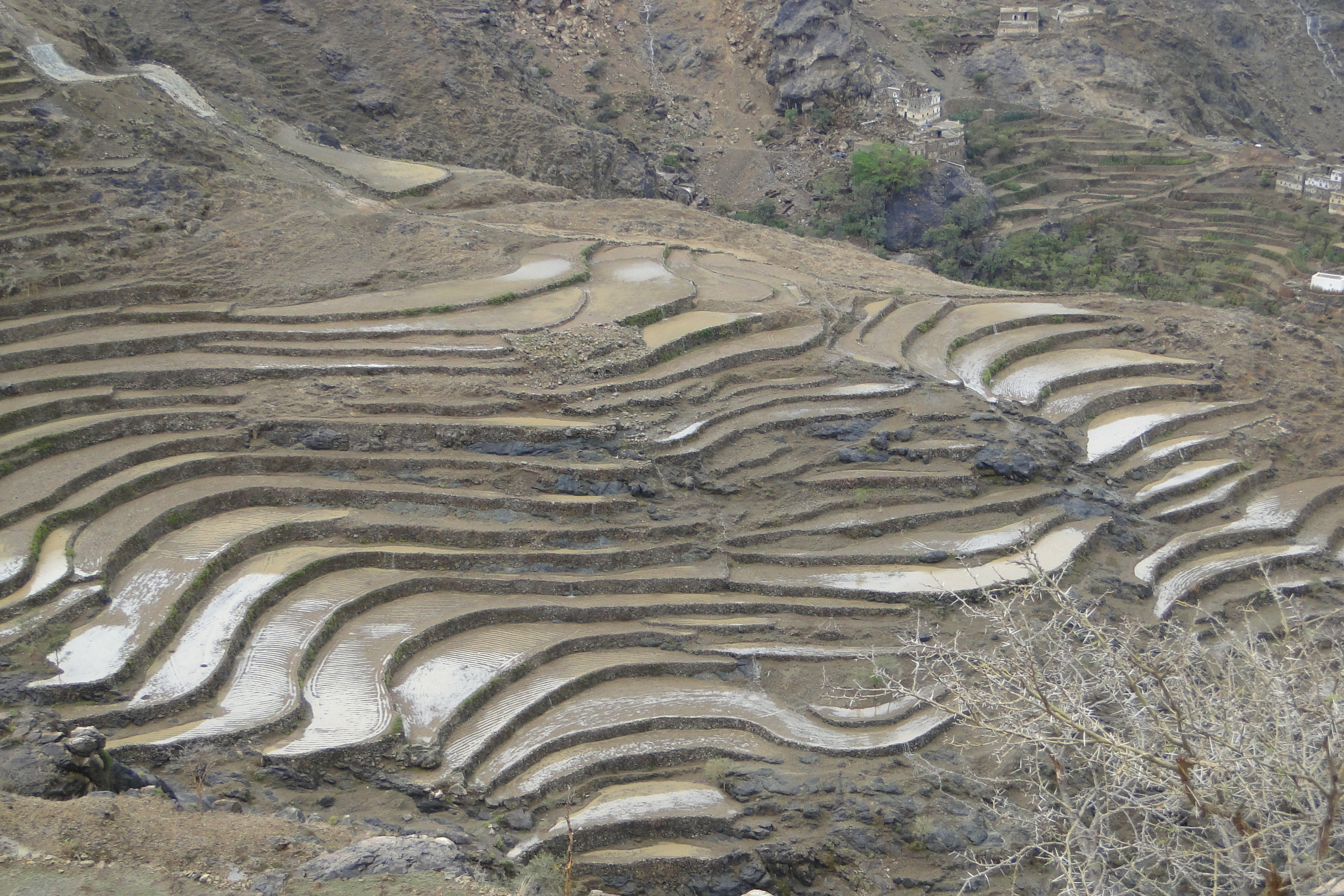
- Terraced fields in Bani Al-Dhabibi, Al Jabin district

- Location in Yemen
- Coordinates: 14.6897°N 43.6194°E
- Country: Yemen
- Governorate: Raymah

Area
  - Total: 349 km^{2} (135 sq mi)

Population (2003)
  - Total: 71,777
- Time zone: UTC+3 (Yemen Standard Time)

Al Jabin District is a district of the Raymah Governorate, Yemen. As of 2003, the district had a population of 71,777 inhabitants.
