= Ambarapola =

Village in Kandy Electoral District, Sri Lanka

Coordinates: 7°12′54″N 80°34′07″E

Ambarapola is a village of Udunuwara Electorate in Kandy Electoral District, Sri Lanka.
