= Campaign against the Southern Coalition =

- Part of Sabaean–Southern Arabian conflicts
| Date | c. 3rd century AD |
| Location | Southern Arabia |
| Result | Sabaean victory; southern coalition dismantled and rival states severely weakened |
| Territorial changes | Sabaean forces expanded their influence, captured enemy settlements, and weakened opposing kingdoms |

Belligerents
| Kingdom of Sabaʾ and Dhū Raydān | Hadramawt; Qatabān; Awsān; Maʿāhir; Radmān; Hawlān; Allied southern Arabian tribes |

Commanders and leaders
| As'ad Shams Asri'; Murthid Yuhahmid; Dharihan Ashwa' | Unknown coalition rulers and commanders |

Units involved
| Royal Sabaean Army; Sabaean tribal contingents; Fayṣān contingents; Yuhbiʿil contingents | Hadramawti forces; Qatabanian forces; Awsānite forces; Maʿāhir forces; Radmānite forces; Hawlānite forces; Allied tribal armies |

Strength
| Unknown | Unknown |

Casualties and losses
| Unknown | Unknown; coalition military power effectively annihilated, Coalition dismantled. |

The Campaign against the Southern Coalition was a military campaign conducted by the Kingdom of Sabaʾ and Dhū Raydān against a coalition of southern Arabian kingdoms and tribes during the 3rd century AD. The conflict is recorded in the Sabaean inscription Ja 629, which describes the military activities of King As'ad Shams Asri', his son Murthid Yuhahmid, and the commander Dharihan Ashwa'.

The campaign represented a major confrontation between Sabaean expansion and a coalition formed by rival southern Arabian powers, including Hadramawt, Qatabān, Awsān, Maʿāhir, Radmān, and Hawlān.

== Course of the campaign ==
=== Battle of Radmān ===
The campaign began with fighting at Radmān, where Sabaean forces under Dharihan Ashwa' became surrounded by coalition forces. King As'ad Shams Asri' and Murthid Yuhahmid led a relief force that defeated the coalition army and rescued Dharihan's forces.

The defeat at Radmān weakened the coalition's ability to coordinate against Sabaʾ and allowed the Sabaean army to continue offensive operations.

=== Siege of Halzawum ===
Following the victory at Radmān, Sabaean forces continued their advance against coalition territory. The siege of Halzawum resulted in the capture and devastation of the settlement and surrounding areas.

The operation further weakened the military infrastructure of Sabaʾ's opponents.

=== Capture of Masraqitan ===
After operations around Halzawum, Sabaean forces captured Masraqitan as part of their continued offensive against coalition-controlled territory.

=== Awsān campaign ===
The Sabaean army then advanced into the territory of Awsān, one of the remaining powers opposing Sabaean authority.

The campaign included several operations:

- Capture of Manwabum
- Assaults on the Cities and Fortresses of Awsān
- Capture of Sayʿān

These operations severely weakened Awsān's military and political power.

=== Fighting near Timnaʿ ===
The final phase of the campaign occurred near Timnaʿ, the capital of Qatabān. Sabaean forces fought remaining coalition forces and successfully completed their campaign operations.

The defeat of coalition forces near Timnaʿ marked the collapse of organized resistance against Sabaean expansion.

== Aftermath ==
The campaign resulted in a major Sabaean victory. The southern coalition ceased to function as an effective military alliance, while several rival kingdoms were weakened.

Awsān suffered major losses of territory and influence, while Qatabān and other southern powers were weakened by the Sabaean offensive.

Following the conclusion of the campaign, Dharihan and the Sabaean rulers returned to Maʾrib.
