= Radman, Yemen =

Radman ردمان
- Village
- Location in Yemen
- Coordinates: 15.35794°N 43.92177°E
- Country: Yemen
- Governorate: Sanaa
- District: Al Haymah Ad Dakhiliyah
- Elevation: 9,751 ft (2,972 m)
- Time zone: UTC+3 (Yemen Standard Time)

Radman (Arabic: ردمان Radmān) is a small village in Al Haymah Ad Dakhiliyah District of Sanaa Governorate, Yemen. It is located on the mountain of the same name, near Jabal An-Nabi Shu'ayb.

== History ==
The earliest known mention of Radman in historical sources is in 1275 (674 AH). Historical sources mentioning it include the Ghayat al-Amani of Yahya ibn Al-Husayn and the Kitab al-Simt of Muhammad ibn Hatim al-Yami al-Hamdani. It had a fort.
