= Handessa =

Coordinates: 7°14′N 80°35′E

Poojagoda
- Village
- Interactive map of Poojagoda
- Country: Sri Lanka
- Province: Central Province
- Time zone: UTC+5:30 (Sri Lanka Standard Time)

Handessa is a village in Sri Lanka. It is located within Central Province in the Udunuwara electorate in the district of Kandy.

== See also ==
- List of towns in Central Province, Sri Lanka

Handessa school system was introduced by C. W. W. Kannangara.
