= Raymah Governorate =

Governorate of Yemen

Coordinates: 15°42′N 43°36′E

Raymah ريمة
- Governorate
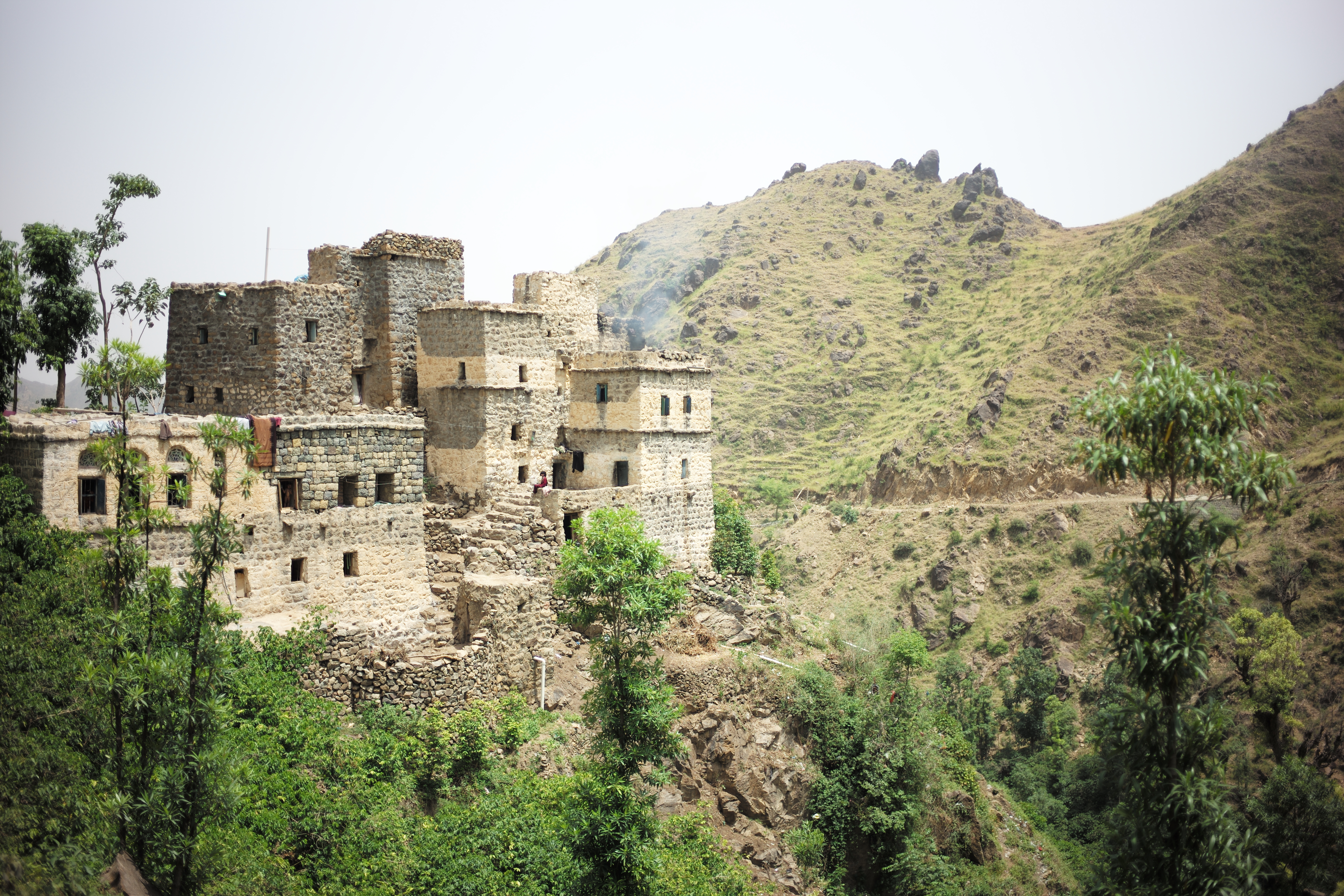
- A village in Raymah governorate

- Country: Yemen
- Region: Tihama Region
- Seat: Al Jabin

Area
  - Total: 2,442 km^{2} (943 sq mi)

Population (2011)
  - Total: 475,000
  - Density: 195/km^{2} (504/sq mi)

Raymah (Arabic: ريمة Raymah) is a governorate of Yemen. Its capital is Al Jabin. The governorate was established in January 2004 from parts of Sanaa Governorate. Its name derives from Wadi Rima, which crosses through the governorate.

== Geography and districts ==
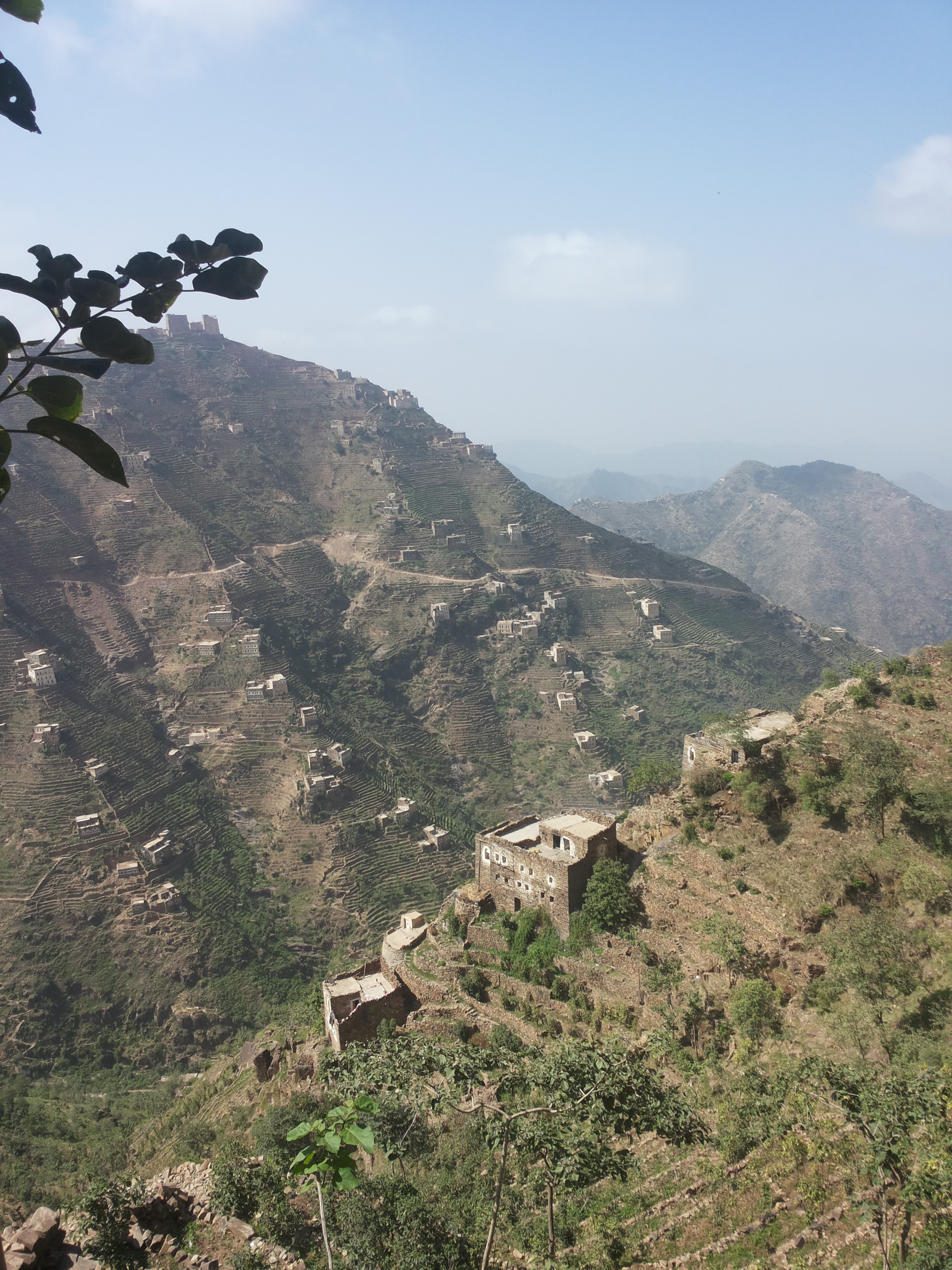
Raymah's topography is mostly mountainous

Raymah Governorate is located in the middle of Yemen's western mountain range, between 14.36°-14.88° north and 43.50°-44°) east. It is about 200 kilometers away from the capital, Sanaa. It borders Al Hudaydah Governorate to the west, Dhamar Governorate to the south and east, and Sanaa Governorate to the northeast.

Its area is roughly 1,915 square kilometers. According to the 2004 General Census of Population, Housing and Establishments in Yemen, the governorate's population was 394,448, with an annual growth rate of 3.04%.

The governorate contains three distinct geographic areas. Its western part includes Al Jafariyah District, Al Jabin District, and Bilad At Ta'am District, in the Al-Hawaz mountains. This area is very rocky. Its middle portion consists of high mountains, with elevations up to 2,950 meters above sea level, but also supports a variety of crops. The eastern section of the governorate includes As Salafiyah District and Mazhar District, and parts of the Al Jabin and Kusmah districts. The topography here is characterized by lower mountains interspersed with wide valleys and fertile agricultural plains.

Raymah Governorate's six districts are as follows:

- Al Jabin district
- Al Jafariyah district
- As Salafiyah district
- Bilad At Ta'am district
- Kusmah district
- Mazhar district

=== Adjacent governorates ===
Governorates of Yemen

- Al Hudaydah Governorate (west)
- Sanaa Governorate (north)
- Dhamar Governorate (east and south)

== Language ==
Many people in the governorate speak Arabic with a Himyarite dialect, in which the first-person singular and second-person conjugations of verbs in perfect form end with the Arabic letter ك (equivalent to an English "k"), instead of ت ("t").

== History ==
In 2022, flash floods killed six people in Raymah Governorate.

== Agriculture ==
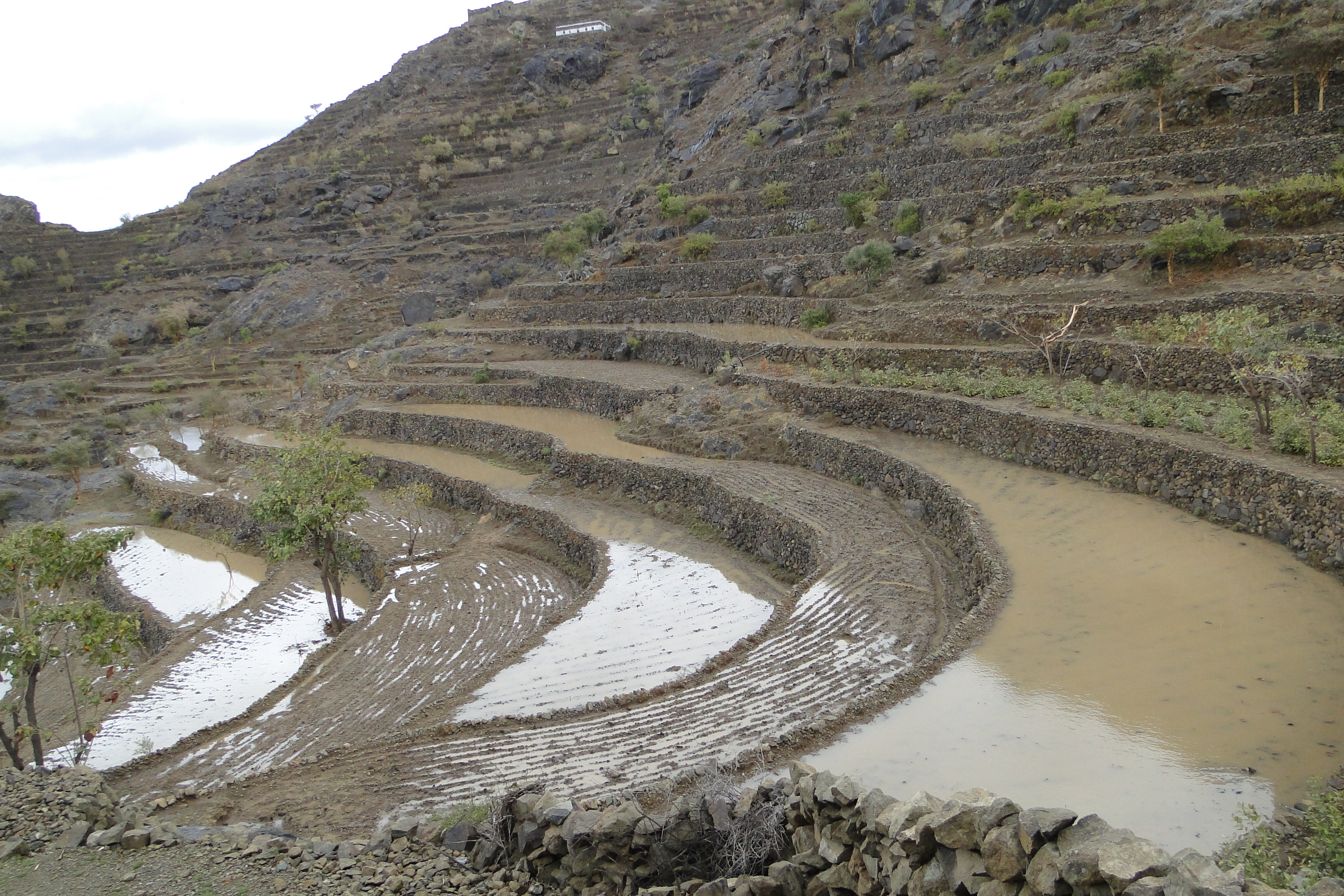
Terraced agriculture in Al-Jabin district

Raymah Governorate has long been a center of coffee cultivation; however, water shortages are a major constraint.

In addition to coffee, farmers in Raymah Governorate grow many vegetables, fruits, grains, honey, and livestock.
