= Governorates of Yemen =

List of subdivisions in Yemen

Governorates of Yemen محافظات اليمن (Arabic)
- Also known as: Muhafazah
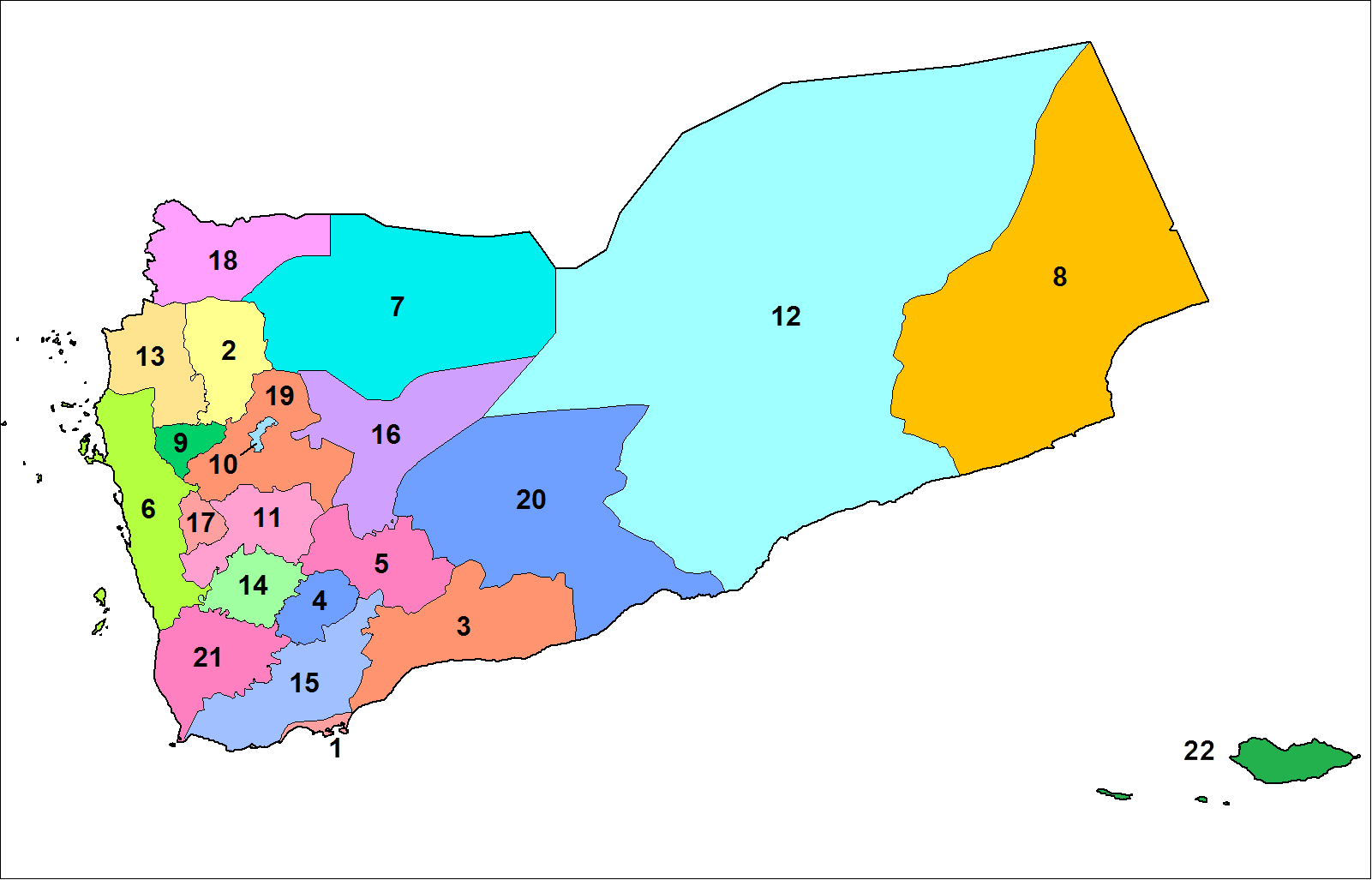
- A clickable map of Yemen exhibiting its 21 governorates.
- Category: Unitary state
- Location: Republic of Yemen
- Number: 21 governorates, 1 municipality
- Populations: (Governorates only): 44,120 (Socotra) – 4,554,443 (Taiz)
- Areas: (Governorates only): 130 km^{2} (49 sq mi) (Sanaa) – 99,000 km^{2} (38,300 sq mi) (Hadhramaut)
- Government: Governorate government, National government
- Subdivisions: District

Governorates of Yemen

The Republic of Yemen is divided into twenty-one governorates (muhafazah) and one municipality (amanah).

The governorates are subdivided into 333 districts (muderiah), which are subdivided into 1,996 sub-districts, and then into 40,793 villages and 88,817 sub villages (as of 2013).

Before reunification in 1990, Yemen existed as two separate countries. South Yemen consisted of modern Aden, Abyan, Mahrah, Hadramaut, Socotra, Lahij, and Shabwah Governorates, while the rest made up North Yemen (also 70% of the area of Dhale Governorate). For more information, see Historic Governorates of Yemen.

== List of governorates ==
Name in English	Name in Arabic	Capital	Area (km^{2})	Population (2013)	Population Density	Key
Abyan	أبين	Zinjibar	21,939	658,824	30.0	3
Aden	عدن	Aden	1,114	1,087,653	976.3	1
Al Bayda	البيضاء	Al Bayda	11,193	835,683	74.6	5
Al Hudaydah	الحديدة	Hodeidah	17,509	3,774,914	215.5	6
Al Jawf	الجوف	Al Hazm	30,620	663,147	21.6	7
Al Mahrah	المهرة	Al Ghaydah	122,500	400,000	3.2	8
Al Mahwit	المحويت	Al Mahwit	2,858	732,360	256.2	9
Amanat Al Asimah^{a}	أمانة العاصمة	Sanaa	126	1,174,767	9,323.5	10
'Amran	عمران	'Amran	9,587	1,123,651	117.2	2
Dhale	الضالع	Dhale	4,786	602,613	125.9	4
Dhamar	ذمار	Dhamar	10,495	1,697,067	161.7	11
Hadramaut	حضرموت	Mukalla	191,737	1,329,085	6.9	12
Hajjah	حجة	Hajjah	10,141	1,887,213	186.0	13
Ibb	إب	Ibb	6,484	3,911,070	603.1	14
Lahij	لحج	Lahij	15,210	926,291	60.5	15
Ma'rib	مأرب	Ma'rib	20,023	504,696	25.2	16
Raymah	ريمة	Al Jabin	3,442	502,505	145.9	17
Saada	صعدة	Saada	15,022	987,663	65.7	18
Sanaa	صنعاء	Sanaa	15,052	2,279,665	151.4	19
Shabwah	شبوة	Ataq	47,728	651,509	13.6	20
Socotra Archipelago^{b}	محافظة أرخبيل سقطرى	Hadibu	2359	60,000	25.4	22
Taiz	تعز	Taiz	12,605	4,554,443	361.3	21
Yemen	اليَمَن	Sanaa	528,076	30,109,225	57.0	

Notes:
^{b} - Socotra Governorate was created in December 2013 from parts of the Hadhramaut Governorate, data included there

== See also ==
- ISO 3166-2:YE
