= List of cities in Yemen =

A city is an administrative division falling under the urban mudiriyah subdivision; it comprises governorate and district centers, as well as any urban population cluster with 5,000 or more inhabitants that possesses one or more basic services.

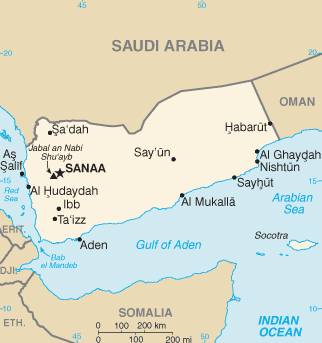
Map of Yemen

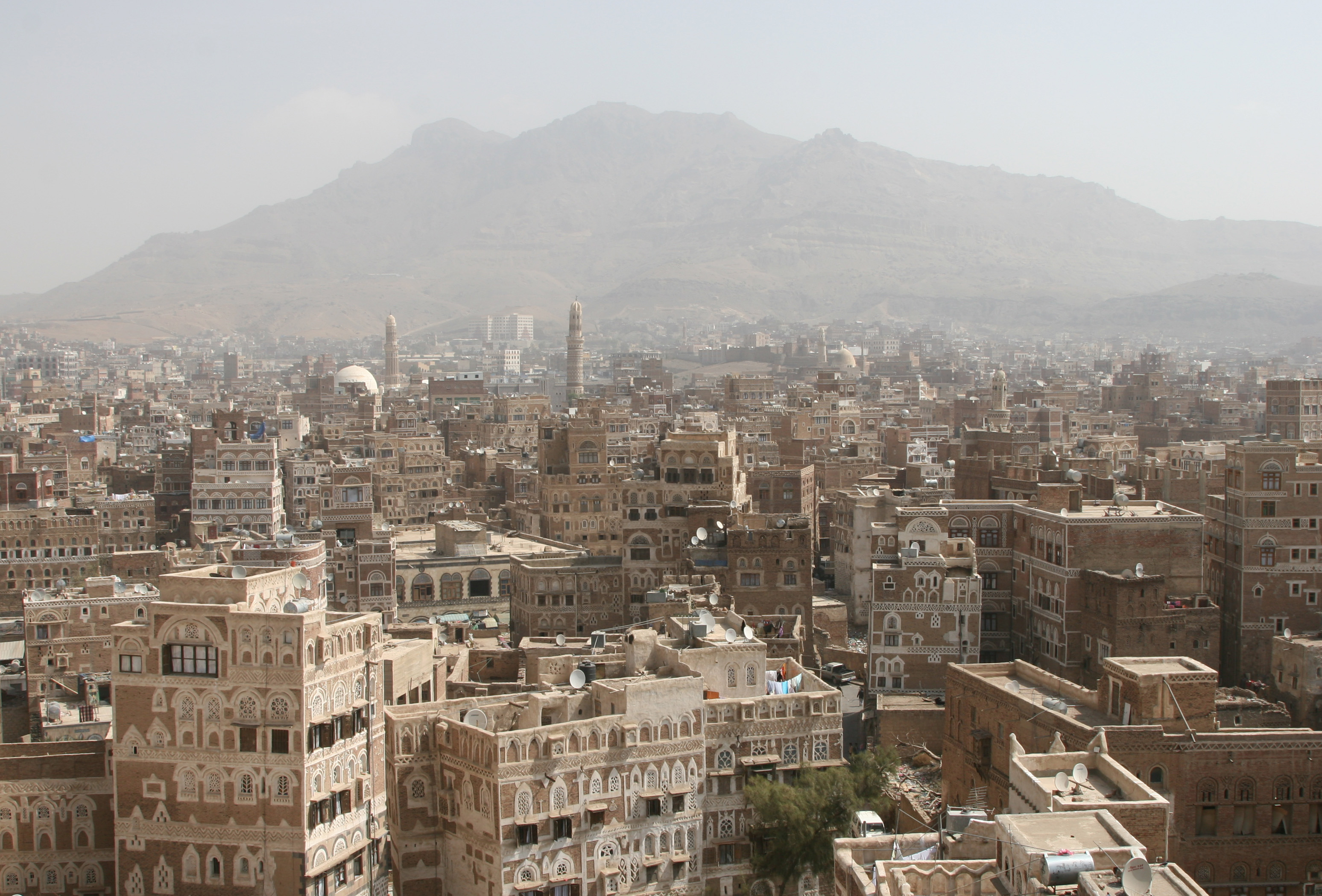
Sanaa, capital of Yemen

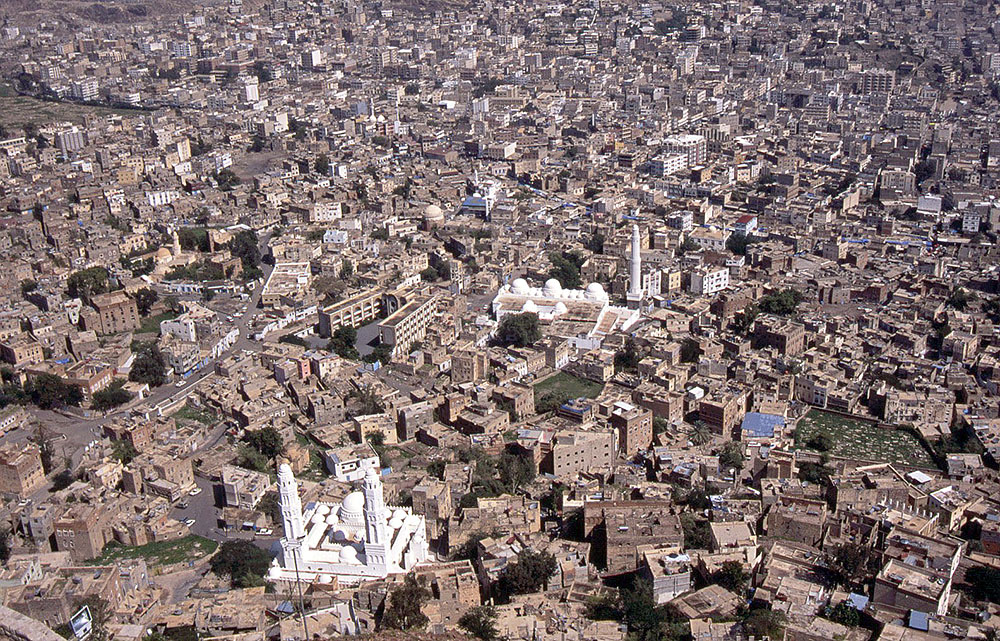
Taiz

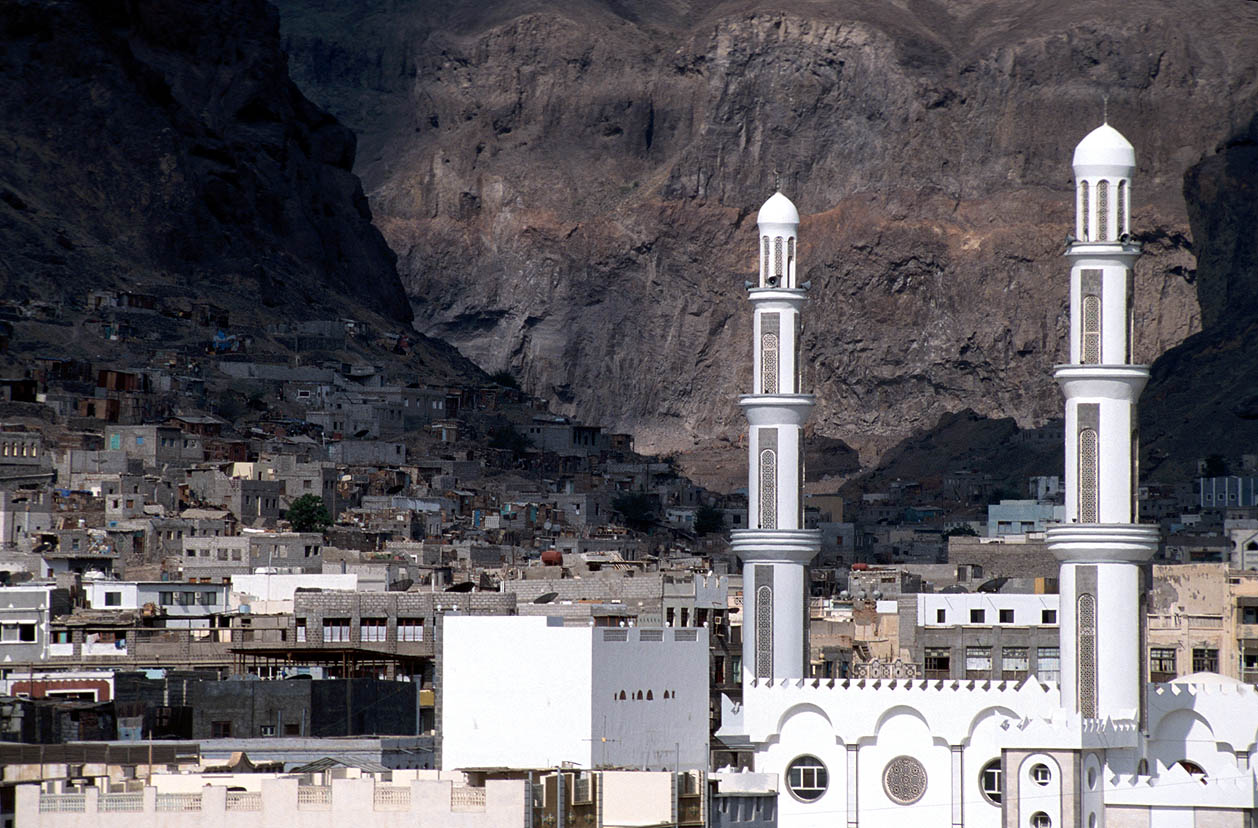
Aden

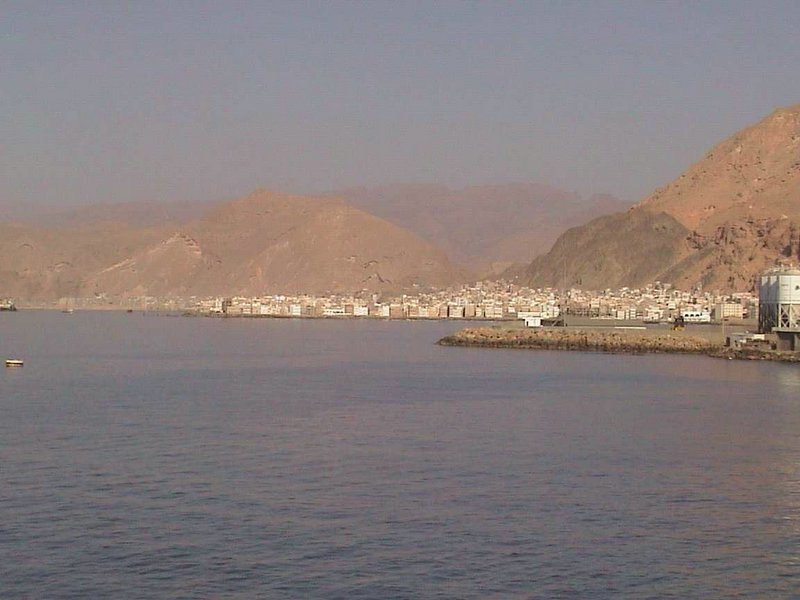
Mukalla

Cities in Yemen
| Rank | Name | | Population | | Governorate |
| Rank | Transcription | Arabic | Census 1994 | Estimate 2005 | Governorate |
|---|---|---|---|---|---|
| 1. | Sanaa | صنعاء | 954,448 | 2,431,649 | Sanaa (Capital District) |
| 2. | Taiz | تعز | 317,571 | 596,672 | Taiz |
| 3. | Hodeidah | الحديدة | 298,452 | 548,433 | Al Hudaydah |
| 4. | Aden | عدن | 398,294 | 507,355 | Aden |
| 5. | Ibb | إب | 103,312 | 225,611 | Ibb |
| 6. | Dhamar | ذمار | 82,920 | 160,114 | Dhamar |
| 7. | Mukalla | المكلا | 122,359 | 144,137 | Hadhramaut |
| 8. | Seiyun | سيئون | 111,728 | 120,137 | Hadhramaut |
| 9. | Zinjibar | (زنجبار (أبين | 50,346 | 70,801 | Abyan |
| 10. | Sayyan | سيان | 58,383 | 69,993 | Sanaa |
| 11. | Ash Shihr | الشحر | 48,577 | 68,313 | Hadhramaut |
| 12. | Sahar | سحار | 27,621 | 60,487 | Sanaa |
| 13. | Saada | صعدة | ? | 51,870 | Saada |
| 14. | Zabid | زبيد | 44,239 | 50,781 | Al Hudaydah |
| 15. | Hajjah | حجة | 24,645 | 46,568 | Hajjah |
| 16. | Bajil District | باجل | 40,561 | 46,005 | Al Hudaydah |
| 17. | Dhi as-Sufal | ذي سفال | 31,963 | 44,949 | Ibb |
| 18. | Rada'a | رداع | 39,227 | 44,755 | Al Bayda' |
| 19. | Bait al-Faqih | بيت الفقيه | 28,773 | 41,652 | Al Hudaydah |
| 20. | al-Marawi'a | المراوعة | 30,504 | 39,911 | Al Hudaydah |
| 21. | Yarim | يريم | 27,802 | 34,805 | Ibb |
| 22. | Al Bayda' | البيضاء | 19,294 | 33,175 | Al Bayda' |
| 23. | 'Amran | عمران | 28,212 | 31,497 | Sanaa |
| 24. | Lahij | لحج | 19,006 | 26,728 | Lahij |
| 25. | Abs | عبس | 18,320 | 25,763 | Hajjah |
| 26. | Harad | حرض | 15,710 | 22,093 | Hajjah |
| 27. | Dimnat Chadir | دمنت خدير | 15,651 | 22,010 | Taiz |
| 28. | Ataq | عتق | 13,995 | 19,681 | Shabwah |
| 29. | al-Mahabischa | المحابشة | 12,918 | 18,166 | Hajjah |
| 30. | Baihan | بيحان | 12,685 | 17,839 | Shabwah |
| 31. | Marib | مأرب | 6,996 | 16,794 | Ma'rib |
| 32. | Thula | ثلاء | 11,564 | 16,262 | 'Amran |
| 33. | Az Zaydiyah | الزيدية | 13,912 | 16,246 | Al Hudaydah |
| 34. | Mudiyah | مودية | 11,071 | 15,569 | Abyan |
| 35. | Khamir | خمر | 10,903 | 15,333 | 'Amran |
| 36. | Hais | حيس | 10,678 | 15,016 | Taiz |
| 37. | Ad-Dahi | الضحى | 10,496 | 14,760 | Al Hudaydah |
| 38. | Mokha | المخا | 10,355 | 14,562 | Taiz |
| 39. | Al Ghaydah | الغيضة | 7,785 | 10,948 | Al Mahrah |
| 40. | Al Mahwit | المحويت | 9,060 | 10,593 | Al Mahwit |
