= Al Ashmur =

Al Ashmur الأشمور
- Location in Yemen
- Coordinates: 15.68685°N 43.7588°E
- Country: Yemen
- Governorate: 'Amran
- District: Amran
- Time zone: UTC+3 (Yemen Standard Time)
- Climate: BSk

Al Ashmur (Arabic: الأشمور, romanized: al-Ashmūr) is an 'uzlah in Amran District of 'Amran Governorate, Yemen. It is located in the highlands west of 'Amran and south of Jabal Iyal Yazid. The route from 'Amran to Kuhlan Affar and Hajjah passes through this area, and there is also a route branching off to the south, towards al-Zafin and Mudaʽ. This southern route was historically used by armies on occasion, as mentioned in sources such as the Ghayat al-amani of Yahya ibn al-Husyan. The first mention of al-Ashmur in that source is in the year 918 (306 AH). According to Hermann von Wissmann, al-Ashmur may take its name from the ruin site of Shamr.
