= Muhammad Abd al-Karim al-Ghamari =

Yemeni military officer (died 2025)

Major general Muhammad Abd al-Karim al-Ghamari
- محمد عبد الكريم الغماري

Chief of Staff of the Yemeni Armed Forces disputed by Sagheer Hamoud Aziz (Presidential Leadership Council)
- In office Unknown (c. 2016) – 2025
- Appointed by: Mohammed Ali al-Houthi
- President: Mahdi al-Mashat
- Prime Minister: Talal Aklan; Abdel-Aziz bin Habtour; Ahmed al-Rahawi
- Preceded by: Hussein Khairan
- Succeeded by: Yusuf al-Madani

Personal details
- Born: Between 1979 and 1984 Izla Dhaen, Washhah district, Hajjah Governorate, North Yemen
- Died: 28 August 2025 Sanaa, Yemen

Military service
- Allegiance: Yemen (de facto under Supreme Political Council)
- Branch/service: Yemeni Armed Forces (SPC); Houthis
- Years of service: c. 2004–2025
- Rank: Major general
- Battles/wars: Houthi insurgency; Battle of Saada; Yemeni civil war; Battle of Sanaa (2014); Marib campaign; Red Sea crisis; Houthi attacks on commercial vessels; Twelve-Day War

Muhammad Abd al-Karim al-Ghamari (Arabic: محمد عبد الكريم الغماري; c. 1979–1984 – 28 August 2025) was a Yemeni militant who served as the Chief of the General Staff of the Houthi-led faction of the Yemeni Armed Forces, holding the rank of Major General.

== Early life ==
Al-Ghamari was born in 1979 or 1984 in Izla Dhaen, Washhah district, Hajjah Governorate, Yemen. He studied at the Hussain Badr al‑Din al‑Houthi Institute in 2003.

== Career ==
Al-Ghamari's first military activity was in 2004, when he oversaw the first Houthi explosives-planting team. After the death of Hussein al-Houthi that year, he became responsible for relocating "al-Muhajiroin", the name for fighters from outside the Saada area, to Saada's Bani Mu'adh area, where they received training to be integrated into the Houthi military. He merged the group's tribal components, which it called the "People's Committees", into their Ministry of Defense. He later promoted the construction of ammunition and explosives manufacturing facilities and oversaw the recruitment of explosives experts into the militia.

Al-Ghamari fought in all six wars against the Yemeni government between 2004 and 2010. In 2005, al-Ghamari established the "Death Brigades" and the "Hussein Brigades". He was appointed as a supervisor in Hajjah in 2007, and that same year he participated in the establishment and arming of the militia's first suicide units. He was arrested by the Yemeni government in 2008. He served as a field commander against government forces in Maran and Razamat, and in 2011 he was a commander during the battle of Saada. He also participated in the 2014 battle of Sanaa.

Between 2005 and 2009, he traveled to Syria and southern Lebanon, where he was trained by military officers supervised by Hezbollah and Iran. During a visit to Tehran in 2009, he learned how to use rocket and artillery shells. In 2012, he visited Beirut's southern suburbs, where he received ideological and military training by Hezbollah.

=== Chief of Staff ===
Al-Ghamari was appointed as chief of staff by Supreme Political Council head Saleh Ali al-Sammad. He also took responsibility for defense, oversaw Ministry of Defense and military activities, and oversaw the theft and refurbishment of Yemeni Armed Forces missiles in coordination with Iranian specialists.

He was a part of the Houthis' Jihad Office, which oversaw the militia's military operations.

Al-Ghamari coordinated military campaigns, including cross-border missile/drone strikes in Saudi Arabia, the UAE, and latterly at Israel. He led offensives in Marib province (2021–22), which threatened nearly a million internally displaced people. During the Red Sea crisis, al-Ghamari commanded missile and drone attacks against Israel as well as the attacks on international shipping in the Red Sea.

== Sanctions & international status ==
He was sanctioned by the U.S. Treasury in May 2021 as a Specially Designated National (SDN) for coordinating offensive operations, and added to UN Security Council’s sanctions list in November 2021 for threatening Yemeni peace and stability and cross-border aggression.

== Assassination ==
On 14 June 2025, during the second day of the Twelve-Day War, the IDF stated that it had targeted al-Ghamari. An Israeli official later stated that he had been wounded in the attack, though this was denied by the Houthis. Some Israeli media reports had initially claimed that al-Ghamari was targeted while he was meeting other Houthi leaders; however, the Israeli Public Broadcasting Corporation later stated that he was at a khat-chewing party.

On 28 August 2025, the IDF again targeted al-Ghamari. Two months later, on 16 October, the Houthis confirmed that al-Ghamari had died, alongside several associates and his 13-year-old son. That same day, the IDF confirmed that al-Ghamari was killed on 28 August.

After his death was announced, the Houthis held a funeral ceremony for al-Ghamari and his son in Sanaa on 20 October 2025.

== See also ==
- Iranian support for the Houthis
