= Mikhlaf =

Local administrative division of Yemen

Mikhlaf (Arabic: مخلاف, plural Makhaleef; مخاليف) was an administrative division in ancient Yemen and is a geographical term used in Yemen. According to Ya'qubi there were eighty-four makhaleef in Yemen. The leader of a mikhlaf is called a Qil (Arabic: قيل, plural Aqial; أقيال).

== Overview ==
Makhaleef were autonomous kingdoms under the united kingdom of Saba' and Dhu Raydan. In the second century AD, Shamir Yuhari'sh II extended the Kingdom of Saba and Dhu Raydan to the kingdom of Hadramout and kingdom of Yamnat and so the kings of that time adopted the long title "King of Saba, Dhu raydan, Hadrmawt and Yamant". They are also known as Tubba kings who established the second Himyarite Kingdom. In the fifth century AD the Tubba king AbuKarib As'ad had the title "King of Saba', Dhu raydan, Hadramawt, Yamnat and his Arabs, on Tawdum (the high plateau) and Tihamah". The system of Makhaleef expanded to these areas and was essential to control these areas.

== List of Makhaleef ==
The following list appears both in al-Ya'qubi's Kitab al-Buldan and, with minor differences, in his Ta'rikh ibn Wadih. However, despite al-Ya'qubi's claim that 84 mikhlaf existed in Yemen, neither list contains 84 names.

1. al-Yahsibayn
2. Yakla
3. Dhimar
4. Tamu’
5. Tyan
6. Tamam
7. Hamal
8. Qudam
9. Khaywan
10. Sinhan
11. Rayhan
12. Jurash
13. Sa'da
14. al-Akhruj
15. Majnah
16. Haraz
17. Hawzan
18. Qufa'a
19. al-Wazira
20. al-Hujr
21. al-Ma'afir
22. 'Ayan
23. al-Shawafi
24. Jublan
25. Wasab
26. al-Sakun
27. Shar'ab
28. al-Janad
29. Maswar
30. al-Thujja
31. al-Mazra'
32. Hayran
33. Ma’rib
34. Hadhur
35. 'Ulqan
36. Rayshan
37. Jayshan
38. Nihm
39. Baysh
40. Dankan
41. Qanawna
42. Yaba
43. Zanlf
44. al-'Ursh of Jazan
45. al-Khasuf
46. al-Sa'id
47. Balha, which is (also called) Mawr
48. al-Mahjam
49. al-Kadra’, which is (also called) Saham
50. al-Ma'qir, which is (also called) Dhuwal
51. Zabid
52. Rima'
53. al-Rakb
54. Bani Majid
55. Lahj
56. Abyan
57. Bayn al-Wadiyayn
58. Alhan
59. Hadramawt
60. Muqra
61. Hays
62. Harad
63. al-Haqlayn
64. 'Ans
65. Bani Amir
66. Ma’dhin
67. Humlan
68. Dhl Jura
69. Khawlan
70. al-Sarw
71. al-Dathina
72. Kubayba
73. Tabala
