= Kuhlan Affar =

Kuhlan ʽAffar كحلان عفار
- Town
- Location in Yemen
- Coordinates: 15.73309°N 43.71902°E
- Country: Yemen
- Governorate: Hajjah
- District: Kuhlan Affar
- Elevation: 7,769 ft (2,368 m)
- Time zone: UTC+3 (Yemen Standard Time)

Kuhlan Affar (Arabic: كحلان عفار Kuḥlān ʽAffār), also called simply Kuhlan (Arabic: كحلان Kuḥlān) and known historically as Kuhlan Taj al-Din, is a town in Hajjah District, Yemen, and the seat of Kuhlan Affar District. Located at the southern end of the Affar mountain range, it has a large market and is a minor administrative center. Agriculture in the area is done with terraces to help retain water.

== History ==
The site of an old fortress, Kuhlan was historically known as Kuhlan Taj al-Din after the emir Taj al-Din Muhammad ibn Ahmad ibn Yahya ibn Hamzah, who according to the Ghayat al-amani of Yahya ibn al-Husayn, was ruler of Kuhlan and other strongholds in Yemen's western mountains during the year 1307 (707 AH). It is not clear from historical sources if this is the Kuhlan built by the Imam of Yemen al-Mansur Abdullah ibn Hamzah (d. 1217), or if it's the Kuhlan where Imad al-Din Yahya ibn Hamzah died and was buried in 1239 (636 AH). It was historically most important during the 16th and 17th centuries.
