= Al-Mahwit University =

Public university in Al Mahwit, Yemen

- جامعة المحويت
- Motto: Excellent higher education, scientific research, and community service in Yemen.
- Type: Public university
- Established: 2022; 4 years ago (as an independent university); 1992 (as Faculty of Education)
- President: pMohammed Abdullah Al-Shalabi
- Location: Al Mahwit and Shibam Kawkaban, Yemen
- Language: Arabic and English
- Website: www.mu.edu.ye

Mahweet University or Al-Mahwit University (جامعة المحويت) is a public university located in Al Mahwit Governorate, Yemen. Officially established as an independent higher education institution in 2022, the university aims to provide quality education, advance scientific research, and serve the local community.

== History ==
The early nucleus of the university dates back to the 1992/1993 academic year with the establishment of the Faculty of Education in the city of Al Mahwit. At that time, the faculty was affiliated with Sana'a University and served as the primary higher education provider for the governorate for several decades.

In August/September 2022 (1444 AH), recognizing the academic and developmental needs of the region, Republican Decree No. (9) was issued to officially establish Mahweet University as an independent public university. This decree unified the existing educational infrastructure and led to the establishment of new faculties, such as the Faculty of Administrative and Human Sciences, and the Faculty of Medicine and Health Sciences, to expand the range of academic disciplines available to students.

== Faculties ==
Mahweet University comprises six main faculties offering more than 25 academic programs:

- Faculty of Education: The oldest faculty, established in 1992 as the foundational nucleus of the university.
- Faculty of Medicine and Health Sciences: Established in 2022, offering programs such as Human Medicine and Pharmacy.
- Faculty of Engineering and Information Technology: Offers modern engineering and technical programs, including Civil Engineering.
- Faculty of Administrative and Human Sciences: Established concurrently with the university's independence in 2022.
- Faculty of Applied and Human Sciences: Located in the historical city of Shibam Kawkaban.
- Faculty of Agriculture: Focused on agricultural and livestock development programs in the governorate.

== Centers ==
The university includes specialized centers to support the educational process and community development:

- Development and Quality Assurance Center
- Continuing Education and Community Service Center

== See also ==
- List of universities in Yemen
- Education in Yemen
- Sana'a University
