= Harad (disambiguation) =

Harad is a fictional region in J. R. R. Tolkien's Middle-earth.

Harad may also refer to:

- Harad, a fruit of the Terminalia chebula tree used as an ayurvedic medicine
- härad, a Swedish administrative area
- Haradh, a town in Saudi Arabia
- Harad district of the Hajjah Governorate, Yemen
