= Al-Jiraf =

Al-Jiraf الجراف
- Village
- Location in Yemen
- Coordinates: 15.40236°N 44.20807°E
- Country: Yemen
- Governorate: Amanat al-Asimah
- District: Ath'thaorah
- Elevation: 7,333 ft (2,235 m)
- Time zone: UTC+3 (Yemen Standard Time)

Al-Jiraf (Arabic: الجراف al-Jirāf), also transliterated as al-Juraf, is a small village in Ath'thaorah District of Amanat al-Asimah Governorate, Yemen. It is located 5 km north of the old city of Sanaa.

== الجراف الخاصة ل محمد شاكر ==
According to Hermann von Wissmann, al-Jiraf is named after a tribe mentioned in Himyaritic inscriptions.

== History ==
The 10th-century author al-Hamdani described al-Jiraf as marking the start of Hashid territory north of Sanaa. Its period of greatest historical importance was during the 1500s, when it served as the capital of al-Mutawakkil Yahya Sharaf ad-Din, who was Imam of Yemen from 1505 to 1558.
