= Alotna =

Coordinates: 15°10′N 43°28′E

Al-Otna العطنة
- Village
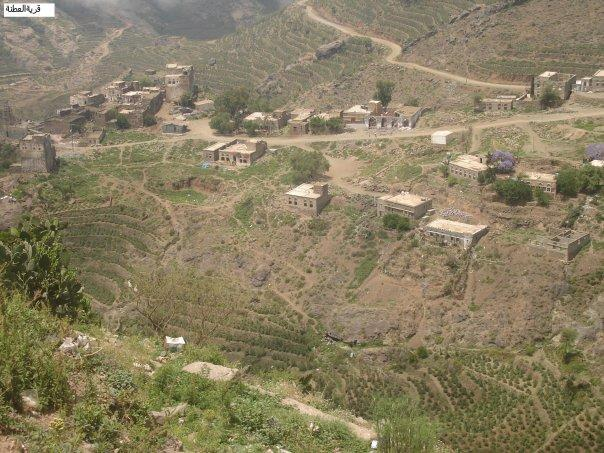

- Location in Yemen
- Country: Yemen
- Governorate: Al Mahwit
- District: Hufash District
- Sub District: Banydohman

Population
  - Total: 300
- Time zone: UTC+3 (EET)
  - Summer (DST): UTC+3 (EEST)

Village Alotna / Attna (Arabic: قرية العطنة) is a village in Yemen.

The village is one of isolation between the villages nearby Banydahman from the Directorate Hufash center - Directorate Hufash under center Directorate (Alsfiqin).

It is affiliated to village residents and of the top founders Al Alotna, Province Mahaweet - Republic of Yemen. Its founder is believed to be Ali bin Hussein Alotna.
