= Ad-Dahi =

Ad-Dahi may refer to:

- Ad Dahi district, Yemen
- Ad-Dahi (Yemen)
- Ed-Dahi, Israel
