= Sahar, Yemen =

Sahar سحر
- Village
- Location in Yemen
- Coordinates: 15.31637°N 44.3088°E
- Country: Yemen
- Governorate: Sanaa
- District: Sanhan
- Elevation: 7,782 ft (2,372 m)
- Time zone: UTC+3 (Yemen Standard Time)

Sahar (Arabic: سحر Saḥar) is a village in Sanhan District of Sanaa Governorate, Yemen. It is located in the 'uzlah of Wadi al-Ajbar.

== History ==
According to the 10th-century writer al-Hamdani, Sahar was part of the land given to the Banu Shihab by the Al Dhi Yazan. He also noted that it had a dam at the time of his writing.

== Climate ==
Sahar has a cold, semi-arid climate, with most rainfall occurring in winter. The Köppen-Geiger climate classification is BSk. The average annual temperature in Sahar is 15.4 °C (59.7 °F). About 281 mm (11.06 in) of precipitation falls annually.

Climate data for Sahar
Month	Jan	Feb	Mar	Apr	May	Jun	Jul	Aug	Sep	Oct	Nov	Dec	Year
Mean daily maximum °C (°F)	21.5 (70.7)	23.6 (74.5)	24.9 (76.8)	24.2 (75.6)	25.1 (77.2)	27.6 (81.7)	25.6 (78.1)	25.1 (77.2)	24.4 (75.9)	21.6 (70.9)	19.6 (67.3)	20.1 (68.2)	23.6 (74.5)
Mean daily minimum °C (°F)	2.0 (35.6)	2.3 (36.1)	6.1 (43.0)	7.5 (45.5)	9.5 (49.1)	9.5 (49.1)	12.5 (54.5)	12.5 (54.5)	9.9 (49.8)	7.3 (45.1)	4.6 (40.3)	3.6 (38.5)	7.3 (45.1)
Average precipitation mm (inches)	6 (0.2)	5 (0.2)	16 (0.6)	48 (1.9)	34 (1.3)	6 (0.2)	55 (2.2)	82 (3.2)	14 (0.6)	2 (0.1)	8 (0.3)	5 (0.2)	281 (11.1)
Source: Climate-Data.org, Climate data
