= Milhan =

Milhan may refer to:

- Acacia citrinoviridis, the black mulga, river jam, milhan or wantan, a tree species endemic to Western Australia
- Milhan District, a district of the Al Mahwit Governorate, Yemen
- Rumaysa bint Milhan (medieval period), one of the earliest women converts to Islam in Yathrib
