= Dhat (disambiguation) =

Dhat may refer to:

- Dhat syndrome is a condition found in the Indian subcontinent in male patients.
- Dhat al-Hajj is an archaeological site in the Tabuk Province of Saudi Arabia.
- Dhat-Badan was the nature goddess of ancient Yemen and Ethiopia.
- Dhat al-Riqa is a location in Saudi Arabia.
- Dhat (Ludhiana West) is a village located in the Ludhiana West tehsil, of Ludhiana district, Punjab.
