= Expedition of Dhat al-Riqa =

625 Military campaign in early Muslim period

| Date | July 625 AD or AD 628 in 3rd month of AH 7 (Islamic calendar) |
| Location | Dhat al-Riqa, Saudi Arabia |
| Result | Muslim victory ( controversial ) Enemy escapes (some sources claim treaty was signed) |

Belligerents
| Muslims of Medina | Banu Ghatafan |

Commanders and leaders
| Muhammad | Unknown |

Strength
| 400 or 800 | Unknown |

The expedition of Dhat al-Riqa took place in July AD 625 (or April 626, Muharram AH 5 of the Islamic calendar according to al-Waqidi), or after the Battle of Khaybar in AD 628, i.e. AH 7 of the Islamic calendar. Two Quran verses, 5:11 and 4:101, are related to this event.

== Background ==
The Islamic prophet Muhammad learned that certain tribes of Banu Ghatafan were assembling at Dhat al-Riqa.

== Battle ==
He proceeded towards Nejd leading 400-700 men after he is said to have mandated Abu Dhar to manage Madinah during his absence. In another version, Uthman ibn Affan, is given this honor. The Muslim fighters penetrated deep into their land until they reached Nakhlah where they came across bedouins of Ghatfan.

This is called the expedition of Dhat al-Riqa (the patchwork of mountains). Muhammad conducted a surprise raid to disperse them. The Ghatafan fled to the mountains, leaving their women behind. No fighting took place, but Muhammad attacked their habitations and captured their women. Other sources report Muhammad signed a treaty with the tribe.

When prayer time came, the Muslims worried that the Ghatafan men might descend from their mountain hideout and attack them while they were praying. Apprehending this fear, Muhammad introduced the ‘service of prayer of danger'. In this system, parties of faithful take turns standing guard while the other party prays. According to Muslim sources, God revealed verses 4:101 regarding shortening of a prayer.

And when you journey in the earth, there is no blame on you if you shorten the prayer, if you fear that those who disbelieve will cause you distress, surely the unbelievers are your open enemy.^{[Quran 4:101]}

== Aftermath ==
While Muhammad was resting under a shade tree at Dhat al-Riqa, a polytheist man came to him with the intention of killing him. The man was playing with Muhammad's sword and pointed it to Muhammad; asking him:

"Do you fear me?"

Muhammad replied:

"Not at all."

The man asked:

"Who would save you?"

Muhammad said:

"Allah would save me."

The would-be assassin then sheathed the sword and returned it to Muhammad. Verse 5:11 was then revealed, proclaiming Allah's protection for Muhammad. After fifteen days Muhammad returned to Medina. However, he was not at peace; he apprehended that the Banu Ghatafan might attack to reclaim their women.

== Timing ==
Some scholars claim that the expedition took place in Nejd (a large tableland in the Arabian Peninsula) in Rabi‘ Ath-Thani or Jumada Al-Ula, A.H. 4 (or beginning of AH 5). They claim that it was strategically necessary to carry out this campaign in order to quell the rebellious Bedouins to prepare for the encounter with the polytheists, i.e. minor Badr Battle in Sha‘ban A.H. 4.

However, Safiur Rahman Mubarakpuri claimed that Dhat Ar-Riqa‘ campaign took place after the fall of Khaibar (and not as part of the Invasion of Nejd). This is supported by the fact that Abu Hurairah and Abu Musa Ashaari witnessed the battle. Abu Hurairah embraced Islam only some days before Khaibar, and Abu Musa Al-Ash‘ari came back from Abyssinia (Ethiopia) and joined Muhammad at Khaibar. The rules relating to the prayer of fear that Muhammad observed at Dhat Ar-Riqa‘ campaign, were revealed at the Asfan Invasion. Scholars say that this took place after Al-Khandaq (the Battle of the Trench).

It is well documented that the Battle of Badr was fought on Friday, 17 Ramadan AH 2. In his book Essai sur l'histoire des arabes avant l'islamisme, pendant l'epoque de Mahomet Armand-Pierre Caussin de Perceval equates Ramadan with the Muslim month ending in January AD 624 and notes (correctly) that the seventeenth of that month was a Saturday (14 January). Again, it is well documented that the battle of Uhud was fought on Saturday, 7 Shawwal AH 3. Caussin de Perceval equates Shawwal with the Muslim month ending in February 625 and says that the seventh of that month was Tuesday. The new moon of that month fell on a Monday morning so would have become visible that evening. Thus the first would have been Tuesday and the seventh Monday. The reason why the dates do not agree is that Caussin de Perceval assumes an intercalation every three years (thus in AH 1, AH 4 and AH 7). This period is too long (the average is seven intercalations in nineteen years rather than seven in 21), which means that his dates become progressively later moving back from the reform of the calendar in AD 632. Since the day of the week in the Muslim calendar advances by one or two days per month the discrepancy is resolved by pushing Caussin de Perceval's calculated dates back a month.

== Islamic sources ==
=== Quran 4:101 and 5:11 ===
The Quran verse 4:101 was reportedly revealed in this event, regarding shortening of prayers, as was verse 5:11, regarding a man who was sent to kill Muhammad or threaten him which states:

O ye who believe! Call in remembrance the favour of Allah unto you when certain men formed the design to stretch out their hands against you, but (Allah) held back their hands from you: so fear Allah. And on Allah let believers put (all) their trust. ^{[Quran 5:11]}

=== Biographical literature ===
The event is mentioned by the Muslim jurist Tabari as follows:

There is a difference in opinion as to which expedition took place after that against the Banu al-Nadir, according to Ibn Humayd - Salamah - Ibn Ishaq: The Messenger of God remained in Medina after the expedition against the Banu al-Nadir for the two months of Rabi' and part of the month of Jumada (from August 11 to late October, 625 [in the intercalated calendar (which was in use at the time) the corresponding dates are 14 May to late July - see section "Discrepancy in dates" below]). Then he went on an expedition into Najd directed against the Banu Muharib and the Banu Tha'labah, part of Ghatafan. [Foundations of the Community, by Tabari, p. 161]

This event is mentioned in Ibn Hisham's biography of Muhammad. The Muslim jurist Ibn Qayyim Al-Jawziyya mentions the event in his biography of Muhammad, Zad al-Ma'ad. Among the modern secondary sources that mention this is The Sealed Nectar.

=== Hadith literature ===
The Sunni Hadith collection Sahih Muslim also says about this event:

We went forward with the Messenger of Allah (may peace be upon him) and when we reached Dhat ar-Riqa', we came to a shady tree which -we left for him One of the polytheists came there and, seeing the sword of the Messenger (may peace be upon him) hanging by a tree, took it up, drew it from the scabbard and said to the Messenger of Allah (may peace be upon him): Are you afraid of Me? He (the Holy Prophet) said: No. He again said: Who would protect you from me? He said: Allah will protect me from you. The Companions of the Messenger of Allah (may peace be upon him) threatened him. He sheathed the sword and hung it up. Then call to prayer was made and he (the Holy Prophet) led a group in two rak'ah. Then (the members of this group) withdrew and he led the second group in two rak'ah. So the Messenger of Allah (may peace be upon him) observed four rak'ah and led in two rak'ah each of the groups.Sahih Muslim, 4:1830

== See also ==
- List of battles of Muhammad
- Military career of Muhammad
- Muslim–Quraysh War
