= Wadi al-Ajbar =

Wadi al-Ajbar وادي الأجبار
- Sub-district
- Location in Yemen
- Country: Yemen
- Governorate: Sana'a
- District: Sanhan and Bani Bahlul

Population (2004)
  - Total: 11,156
- Time zone: UTC+3

Wadi al-Ajbar (Arabic: وادي الأجبار) is a sub-district located in Sanhan and Bani Bahlul District, Sana'a Governorate, Yemen. Wadi al-Ajbar had a population of 11156 according to the 2004 census.
