= Salaq =

Salaq سلق
- Country: Yemen
- Governorate: Hajjah

Population (2004)
  - Total: 231
- Time zone: UTC+3 (Yemen Standard Time)

Salaq (Arabic: سلق) is a village in Kushar District, Yemen. It is located in the Hajjah Governorate, According to the 2004 census it had a population of 231 people.
