= Ghoul Shabak =

Village in Hajjah, Yemen

Ghoul Shabak is a village in Al Jamimah District of the Hajjah Governorate, Yemen. and according to the 2004 Census, the village has a population of 55 residents.
