= Abs, Yemen =

Abs Arabic: عبس
- Location in Yemen
- Coordinates: 16°0′7″N 43°11′46″E
- Country: Yemen
- Governorate: Hajjah
- District: Abs

Population (2005)
  - Total: 25,763
- Time zone: UTC+3 (Yemen Standard Time)

Abs (Arabic: عبس) is a town on the coastal plain of Abs district, Hajjah Governorate, Yemen. In 2005 it had a population of 25,763 inhabitants and was the 24th largest town in Yemen.

The city has been heavily affected by the Yemen Civil War. On 11 June 2018, a cholera treatment facility, operated by Doctors without Borders to counter the country's cholera outbreak, was bombed by the Saudi-led coalition.

== Climate ==
In Abs, the climate is hot and dry. The Köppen-Geiger climate classification is BWh (hot arid climate). The average annual temperature in Abs is 28.7 °C (83.7 °F). About 70 mm (2.76 in) of rain falls annually.

Climate data for Abs
Month	Jan	Feb	Mar	Apr	May	Jun	Jul	Aug	Sep	Oct	Nov	Dec	Year
Mean daily maximum °C (°F)	29.2 (84.6)	30.1 (86.2)	31.7 (89.1)	33.6 (92.5)	36.2 (97.2)	37.3 (99.1)	37.2 (99.0)	36.9 (98.4)	36.2 (97.2)	34.3 (93.7)	31.5 (88.7)	30.2 (86.4)	33.7 (92.7)
Mean daily minimum °C (°F)	19.5 (67.1)	20.0 (68.0)	21.9 (71.4)	23.2 (73.8)	25.9 (78.6)	27.1 (80.8)	27.8 (82.0)	27.4 (81.3)	26.3 (79.3)	23.98 (75.16)	21.5 (70.7)	19.7 (67.5)	23.69 (74.64)
Average rainfall mm (inches)	6 (0.2)	2 (0.1)	6 (0.2)	4 (0.2)	6 (0.2)	0 (0)	7 (0.3)	17 (0.7)	6 (0.2)	5 (0.2)	5 (0.2)	6 (0.2)	70 (2.8)
Source: Climate-Data.org, Climate data
