= Salbah =

Salbah سلبة - بني العوام
- Country: Yemen
- Governorate: Hajjah

Population (2004)
  - Total: 945
- Time zone: UTC+3 (Yemen Standard Time)

Salbah (Arabic: سلبة) is a village in Jabal Nimr, Yemen. It is located in the Hajjah Governorate, According to the 2004 census it had a population of 945 people.
