= Az Zaydiyah =

- Location in Yemen
- Coordinates: 15°19′45″N 43°00′34″E
- Country: Yemen
- Governorate: Al Hudaydah Governorate
- District: Az Zaydiyah District

Population (2005)
  - Total: 16,246
- Time zone: UTC+3 (Yemen Standard Time)

Az Zaydiyah (Arabic: الزيدية) is a city located in Al Hudaydah Governorate, Yemen and it is the district capital of Az Zaydiyah District. Its population reached 16,246 people, according to the census conducted in 2005.
