= Tabala =

Tabala or Tabalah may refer to:

== Places ==
- Tabala (Lydia)
- Tabala, Niger
- Tabalah, Saudi Arabia
- Tabalah, Yemen
- Tabala, Jonava (Lithuania)

== Other uses ==
- Tabla, an Indian percussion instrument
