= Dahi =

Dahi may refer to:

- Dahi (curd), a traditional yogurt of the Indian subcontinent
- Ed Dahi, an Arab village in Israel
- Ad Dahi district, Yemen

== People with the name ==
- Dahi Al Naemi (born 1978), Qatari footballer
- Dahi Handi or Govinda Sport, Indian festival
- DJ Dahi, American hip hop record producer and disc jockey, also known simply as Dahi
- Roger Dahi, Syrian sport shooter
