= Kuhlan Ash Sharaf district =

Kuhlan Ash Sharaf District مديرية كحلان الشرف
- District
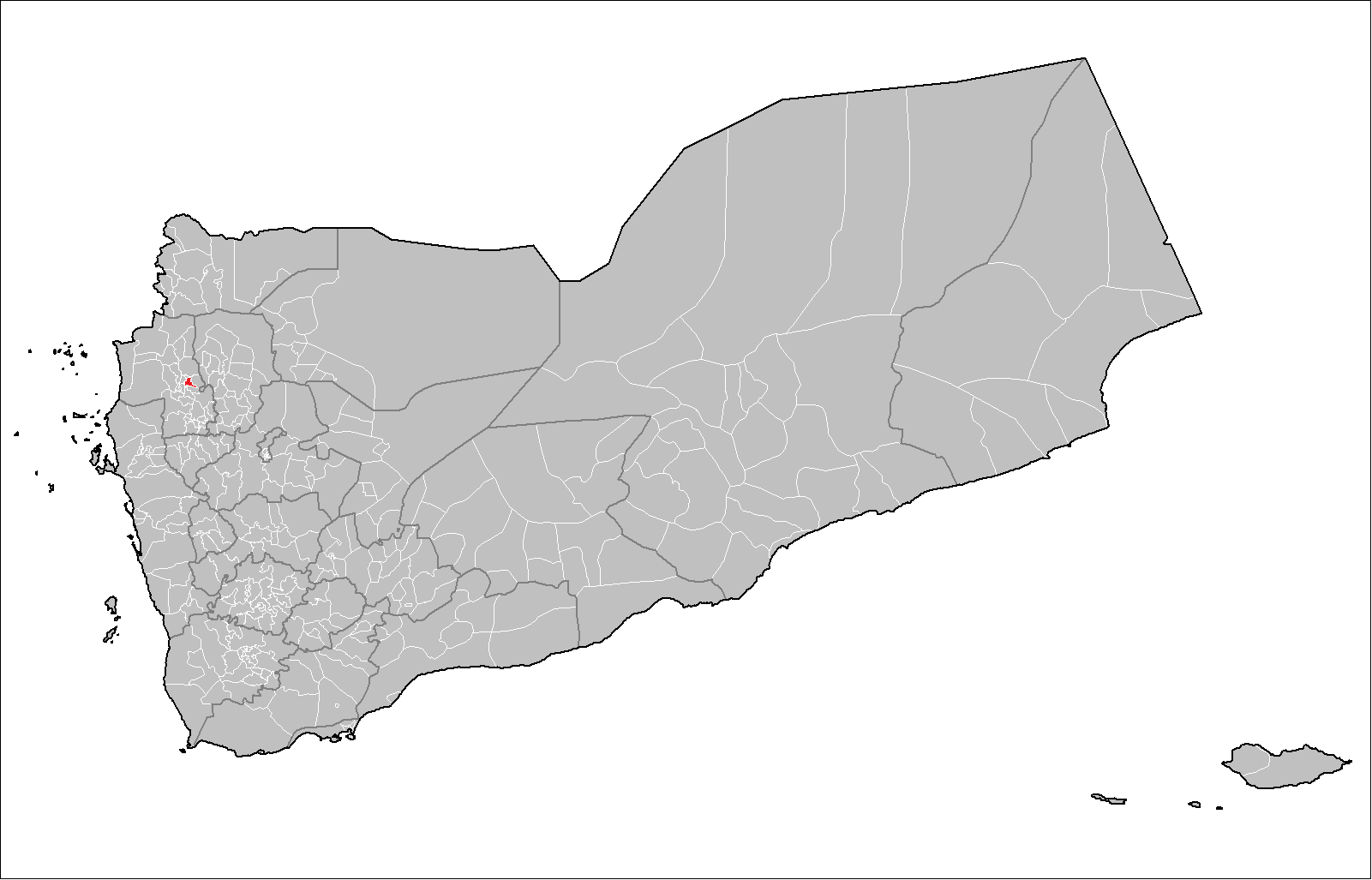
- Country: Yemen
- Governorate: Hajjah Governorate

Population (2003)
  - Total: 44,760
- Time zone: UTC+3 (Yemen Standard Time)

Kuhlan Ash Sharaf District (Arabic: مديرية كحلان الشرف) is a district of the Hajjah Governorate, Yemen. As of 2003, the district had a population of 44,760 people.

The district is under control of the Shi'a militant group, the Houthis, since November 2011.
