= At Tahrir district =

Coordinates: 15°30′N 44°17′E

At Tahrir District
- District
- Interactive map of At Tahrir District
- Country: Yemen
- Governorate: Amanat Al Asimah

Population (2003)
  - Total: 66,898
- Time zone: UTC+3 (Yemen Standard Time)

At Tahrir District is a district of the Amanat Al Asimah Governorate, Yemen. As of 2003, the district had a population of 66,898 inhabitants.
