= Al Wahdah district =

Coordinates: 15.3350°N 44.1867°E

Al Wahdah District
- District
- Interactive map of Al Wahdah District
- Country: Yemen
- Governorate: Amanat Al Asimah Governorate

Population (2003)
  - Total: 99,956
- Time zone: UTC+3 (Yemen Standard Time)

Al Wahdah District is a district of the Amanat Al Asimah Governorate, Yemen. As of 2003, the district had a population of 99,956 inhabitants.
