= Al Maghrabah district =

Al Maghrabah District مديرية المغربة
- District
- Location in Yemen
- Coordinates: 15°40′N 43°35′E
- Country: Yemen
- Governorate: Hajjah

Population (2003)
  - Total: 64,440
- Time zone: UTC+3 (Yemen Standard Time)

Al Maghrabah District (Arabic: مديرية المغربة) is a district of the Hajjah Governorate, Yemen. As of 2003, the district had a population of 64,440 inhabitants.
