= Al Marawi'ah district =

Al Marawi'ah District
- District
- Location in Yemen
- Coordinates: 14.8344°N 43.1964°E
- Country: Yemen
- Governorate: Al Hudaydah

Population (2003)
  - Total: 129,527
- Time zone: UTC+3 (Yemen Standard Time)

Al Marawi'ah District is a district of the Al Hudaydah Governorate, Yemen. As of 2003, the district had a population of 129,527 inhabitants. It may take its name from the city Al-Marawi'a.
