= Mabyan district =

Coordinates: 15.7717°N 43.5508°E

Mabyan District مديرية مبين
- District
- Interactive map of Mabyan District
- Country: Yemen
- Governorate: Hajjah

Population (2003)
  - Total: 50,732
- Time zone: UTC+3 (Yemen Standard Time)

Mabyan District (Arabic: مديرية مبين) is a district of the Hajjah Governorate, Yemen. As of 2003, the district had a population of 50,732 inhabitants.
