= Anss district =

Coordinates: 14°35′N 44°25′E

ʿAnss District عنس ʿAns
- District
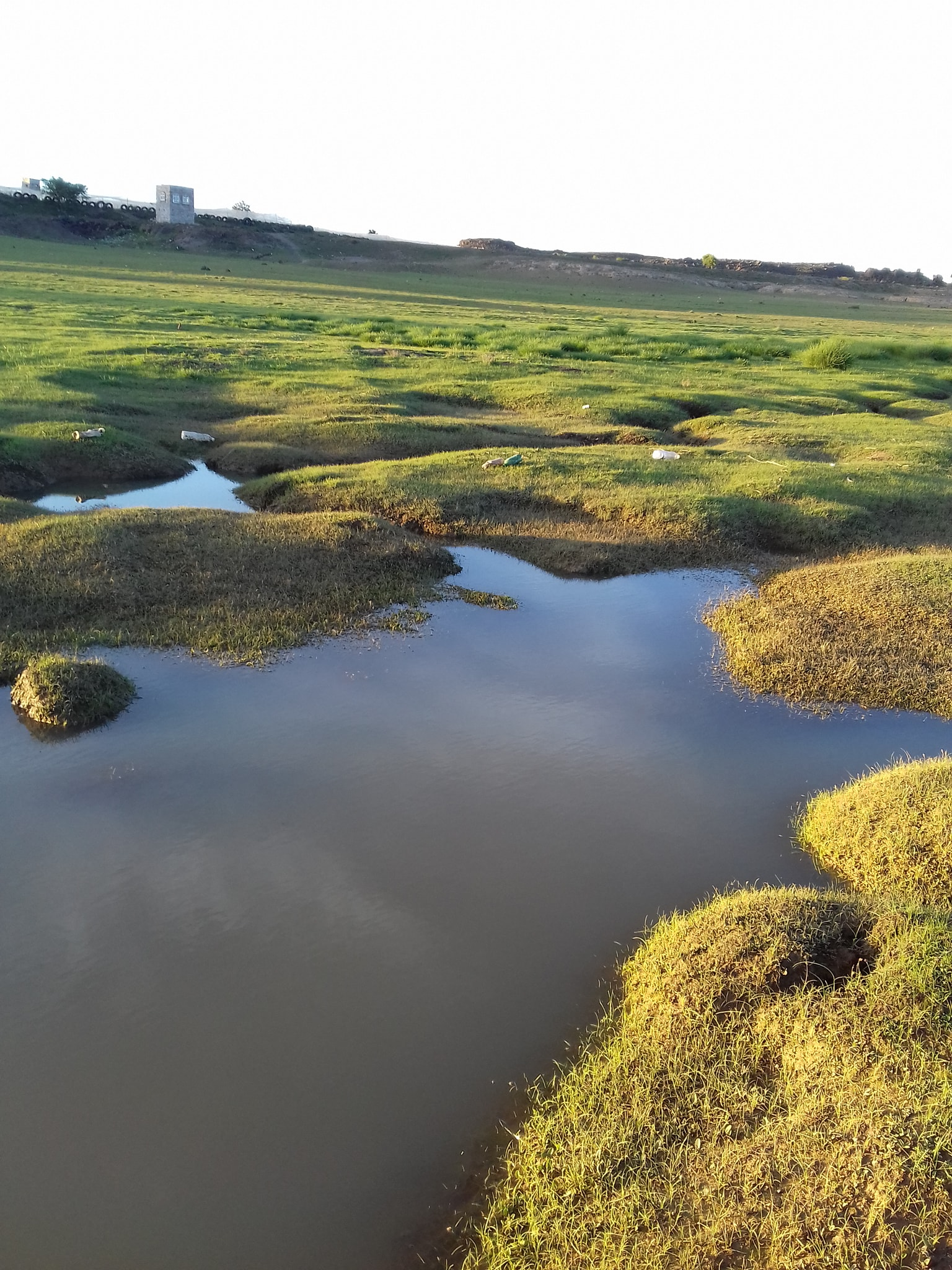
- A view in Jabal al-Dar in ʿAns
- Interactive map of ʿAnss District
- Country: Yemen
- Governorate: Dhamar

Population (2003)
  - Total: 119,124
- Time zone: UTC+3 (Yemen Standard Time)

ʿAnss District, also spelled ʿAns, (Arabic: مديرية عنس) is a district of the Dhamar Governorate, Yemen. As of 2003, the district had a population of 119,124 inhabitants.

== History ==
The 9th-century writer Ya'qubi listed ʿAns as one of the 84 mikhlafs (administrative divisions) of Yemen. It was a tribal region named after ʿAns b. Mālik, and contained the towns of Thāt and Bishār.
