= Al Mahabishah district =

Al Mahabishah District مديرية المحابشة
- District
- Location in Yemen
- Coordinates: 15°55′N 43°32′E
- Country: Yemen
- Governorate: Hajjah

Population (2003)
  - Total: 50,865
- Time zone: UTC+3 (Yemen Standard Time)

Al Mahabishah District (Arabic: مديرية المحابشة) is a district of the Hajjah Governorate, Yemen. As of 2003, the district had a population of 50,865 inhabitants.
