= Kuhlan Affar district =

Coordinates: 15.7554°N 43.6971°E

Kuhlan Affar District مديرية كحلان عفار
- District
- Interactive map of Kuhlan Affar District
- Country: Yemen
- Governorate: Hajjah
- Seat: Kuhlan Affar

Population (2003)
  - Total: 40,333
- Time zone: UTC+3 (Yemen Standard Time)

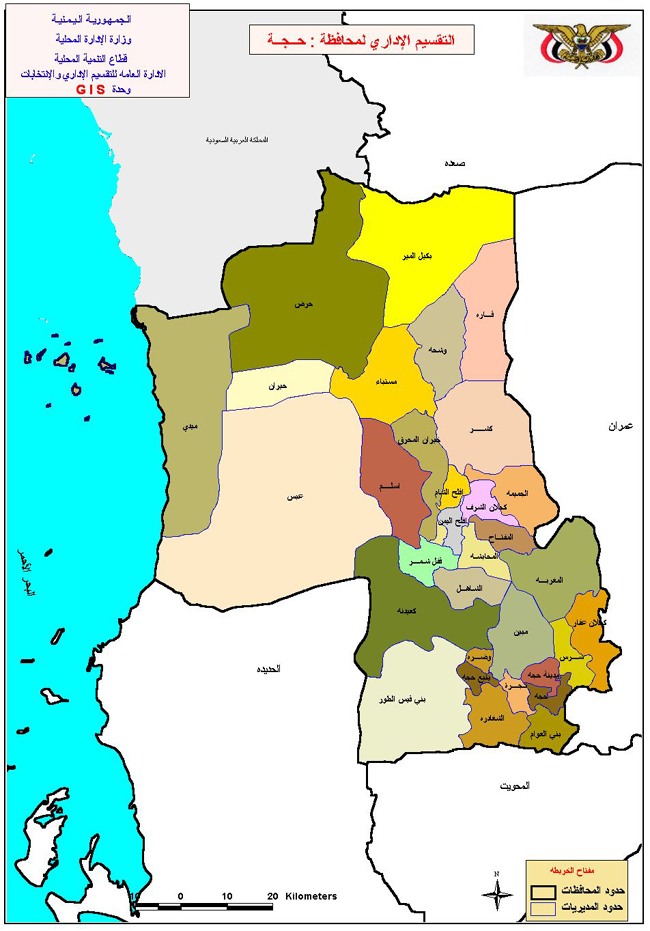

Kuhlan Affar District (Arabic: مديرية كحلان عفار) is a district of the Hajjah Governorate, Yemen. As of 2003, the district had a population of 40,333 inhabitants.

== See also ==
- Kuhlan Affar
