= Bani Al Awam district =

Coordinates: 15.5808°N 43.6078°E

Bani Al Awam District مديرية بني العوام
- District
- Interactive map of Bani Al Awam District
- Country: Yemen
- Governorate: Hajjah

Population (2003)
  - Total: 52,222
- Time zone: UTC+3 (Yemen Standard Time)

Bani Al Awam District (Arabic: مديرية بني العوام) is a district of the Hajjah Governorate, Yemen. As of 2003, the district had a population of 52,222 inhabitants.
