= Abs district =

Coordinates: 15°55′N 43°00′E

Abs district مديرية عبس بني ثواب
- District
- Interactive map of Abs district
- Country: Yemen
- Governorate: Hajjah
- Seat: Abs

Population (2003)
  - Total: 133,824
- Time zone: UTC+3 (Yemen Standard Time)

Abs district (Arabic: مديرية عبس) is a district of the Hajjah Governorate, in north-western Yemen. In 2003, the district had a population of 133,824.
