= Kushar district =

Coordinates: 16°10′N 43°23′E

Kushar District مديرية كشر
- District
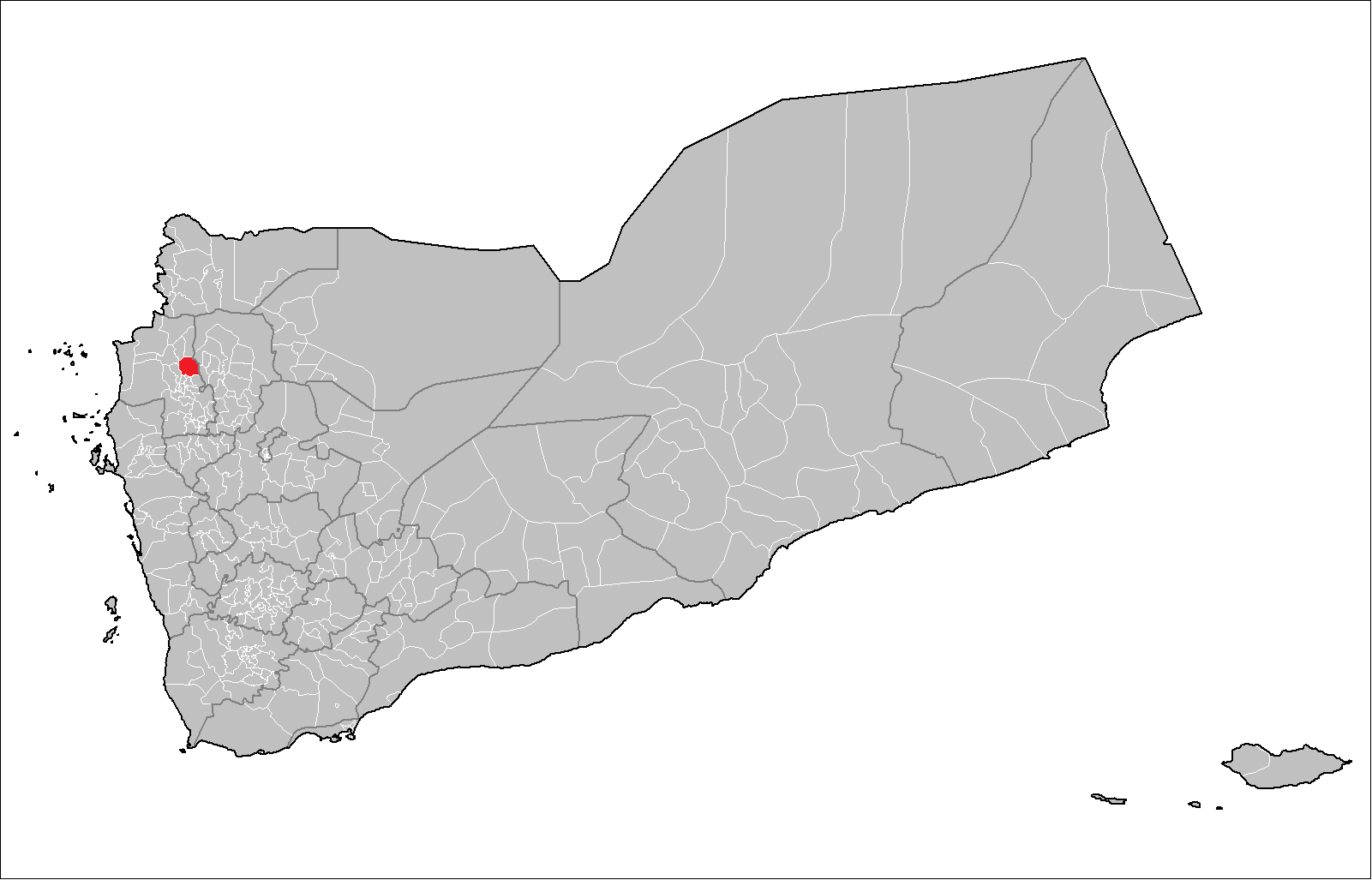
- Country: Yemen
- Governorate: Hajjah Governorate

Population (2003)
  - Total: 74,176
- Time zone: UTC+3 (Yemen Standard Time)

Kushar District (Arabic: مديرية كشر) is a district of the Hajjah Governorate, Yemen. As of 2003, the district had a population of 74,176 people.
