= Aslem district =

Coordinates: 16.0597°N 43.2939°E

Aslem District مديرية أسلم
- District
- Interactive map of Aslem District
- Country: Yemen
- Governorate: Hajjah

Population (2003)
  - Total: 49,227
- Time zone: UTC+3 (Yemen Standard Time)

Aslem District (Arabic: مديرية أسلم) is a district of the Hajjah Governorate, Yemen. As of 2003, the district had a population of 49,227 inhabitants.
