= Qafl Shamer district =

Coordinates: 15°55′N 43°30′E

Qafl Shamer District مديرية قفل شمير
- District
- Interactive map of Qafl Shamer District
- Country: Yemen
- Governorate: Hajjah

Population (2003)
  - Total: 50,439
- Time zone: UTC+3 (Yemen Standard Time)

Qafl Shamer District (Arabic: مديرية قفل شمير) is a district of the Hajjah Governorate, Yemen. As of 2003, the district had a population of 50,439 inhabitants.
