= Sharas district =

Coordinates: 15.7283°N 43.6544°E

Sharas District
- District
- Interactive map of Sharas District
- Country: Yemen
- Governorate: Hajjah

Population (2003)
  - Total: 15,707
- Time zone: UTC+3 (Yemen Standard Time)

Sharas District is a district of the Hajjah Governorate, Yemen. As of 2003, the district had a population of 15,707 inhabitants.
