= Al Miftah district =

Al Miftah District مديرية المفتاح
- District
- Location in Yemen
- Coordinates: 15°50′N 43°23′E
- Country: Yemen
- Governorate: Hajjah Governorate

Population (2003)
  - Total: 31,691
- Time zone: UTC+3 (Yemen Standard Time)

Al Miftah District (Arabic: مديرية المفتاح) is a district of the Hajjah Governorate, Yemen. As of 2003, the district had a population of 31,691 people.
