= Khayran Al Muharraq district =

Coordinates: 16.0894°N 43.3575°E

Khayran Al Muharraq District مديرية خيران المحرق
- District
- Interactive map of Khayran Al Muharraq District
- Country: Yemen
- Governorate: Hajjah

Population (2003)
  - Total: 68,707
- Time zone: UTC+3 (Yemen Standard Time)

Khayran Al Muharraq District (Arabic: مديرية خيران المحرق) is a district of the Hajjah Governorate, Yemen. As of 2003, the district had a population of 68,707 inhabitants.
