= Bakil Al Mir district =

Coordinates: 16°25′N 43°25′E

Bakil Al Mir District مديرية بكيل المير
- District
- Interactive map of Bakil Al Mir District
- Country: Yemen
- Governorate: Hajjah Governorate

Population (2003)
  - Total: 21,701
- Time zone: UTC+3 (Yemen Standard Time)

Bakil Al Mir District (Arabic: مديرية بكيل المير) is a district of the Hajjah Governorate, Yemen. As of 2003, the district had a population of 21,701 people.
