= Al Jamimah district =

Al Jamimah District مديرية الجميمة
- District
- Location in Yemen
- Coordinates: 15°55′N 43°25′E
- Country: Yemen
- Governorate: Hajjah Governorate

Population (2003)
  - Total: 41,211
- Time zone: UTC+3 (Yemen Standard Time)

Al Jamimah District (Arabic: مديرية الجميمة) is a district of the Hajjah Governorate, Yemen. As of 2003, the district had a population of 41,211 people.

Villages include Ghoul Shabak.
