= Aflah Al Yaman district =

Coordinates: 15°57′N 43°27′E

Aflah Al Yaman district مديرية أفلح اليمن
- District
- Interactive map of Aflah Al Yaman district
- Country: Yemen
- Governorate: Hajjah

Population (2003)
  - Total: 38,874
- Time zone: UTC+3 (Yemen Standard Time)

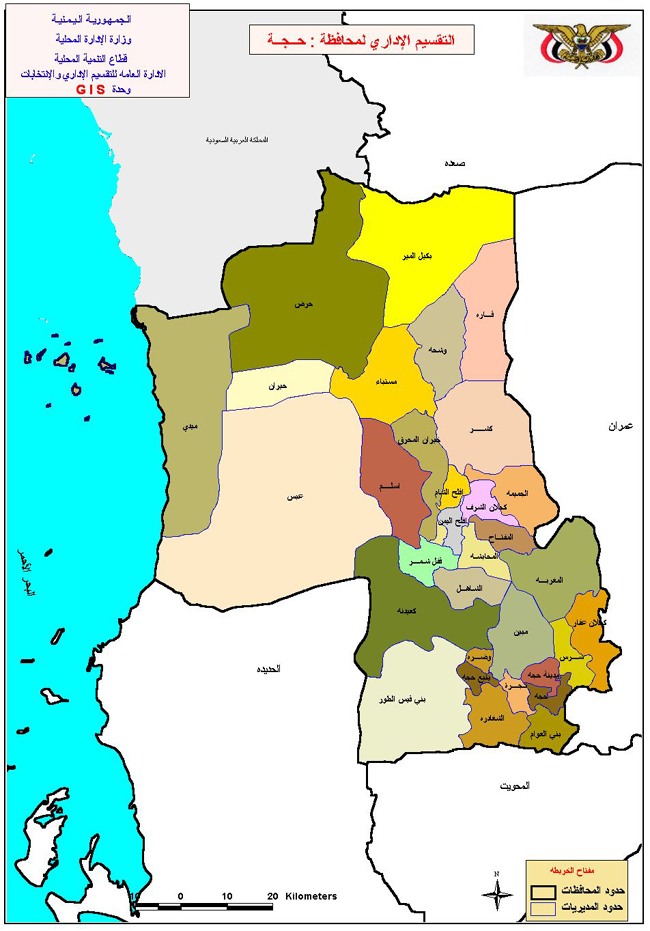
Administrative division of Hajjah governorate

Aflah Al Yaman district (Arabic: مديرية أفلح اليمن) is a district of the Hajjah Governorate, Yemen. As of 2003, the district had a population of 38,874 inhabitants.
