= Ad-Dahi, Yemen =

City in Al Hudaydah, Yemen

Ad-Dahi الضحي
- Town
- Location in Yemen
- Coordinates: 15°12′54″N 43°4′17″E
- Country: Yemen
- Governorate: Al Hudaydah
- District: Ad Dahi
- Time zone: UTC+3 (Yemen Standard Time)

Ad-Dahi (Arabic: الضحي) is a city in Al Hudaydah Governorate, Yemen. It has a population of 14,760 and is the largest city in Ad Dahi district.

== Notable people ==
- Ahmed Fathi (Musician), born in Ad-Dahi

== See also ==
- List of cities in Yemen
