= Aflah Ash Shawm district =

Coordinates: 16°00′N 43°27′E

Aflah Ash Shawm district مديرية أفلح الشام
- District
- Interactive map of Aflah Ash Shawm district
- Country: Yemen
- Governorate: Hajjah Governorate

Population (2003)
  - Total: 54,054
- Time zone: UTC+3 (Yemen Standard Time)

Aflah Ash Shawm district (Arabic: مديرية أفلح الشام) is a district of the Hajjah Governorate, Yemen. In 2003, the district had a population of 54,054.
