= Assafi'yah district =

Coordinates: 15.3431°N 44.2353°E

Assafi'yah District
- District
- Interactive map of Assafi'yah District
- Country: Yemen
- Governorate: Amanat Al Asimah

Population (2003)
  - Total: 109,109
- Time zone: UTC+3 (Yemen Standard Time)

Assafi'yah District is a district of the Amanat Al Asimah Governorate, Yemen. As of 2003, the district had a population of 109,109 inhabitants.
