= Hais, Yemen =

Hais حيس
- City
- Interactive map of Hais
- Coordinates: 13.93182°N 43.47905°E
- Country: Yemen
- Governorate: Ta'izz Governorate
- District: Hays District
- Control: Houthi movement

Population (2004)
  - Total: 15,016
- Time zone: UTC+3 (Arabia Standard Time)

Taiz Governorate

Hais (حيس) is a city in Hays District of Ta'izz Governorate of Yemen. In 2004, it had a population of 15,016 people and is the 35th largest town in Yemen.

The city is built on the Red Sea Coastal plain, adjacent to the Nakhlah Wadi and is a typical Arab town with maze road network and a main mosque. The resort town of Khawkhah is downstream of Hais on the Red Sea Coast.

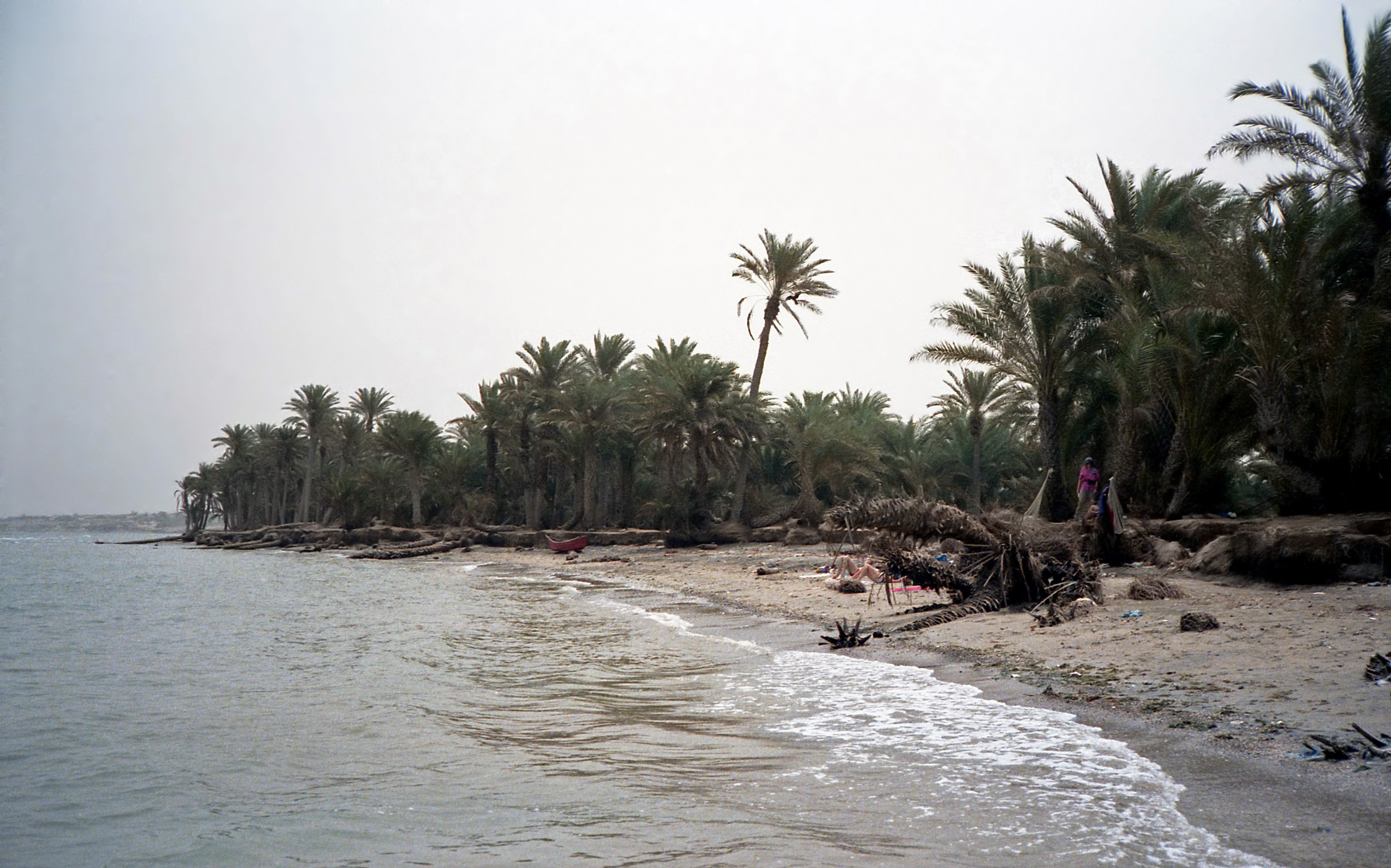
Khawkhah downstream of Hais
