= Qarah district =

Coordinates: 16°15′N 43°23′E

Qarah District
- District
- Interactive map of Qarah District
- Country: Yemen
- Governorate: Hajjah

Population (2003)
  - Total: 30,641
- Time zone: UTC+3 (Yemen Standard Time)

Qarah District is a district of the Hajjah Governorate, Yemen. As of 2003, the district had a population of 30,641 inhabitants.
