= Ku'aydinah district =

Coordinates: 15°49′05″N 43°21′36″E

Ku'aydinah District مديرية كعيدنة
- District
- Interactive map of Ku'aydinah District
- Country: Yemen
- Governorate: Hajjah

Population (2003)
  - Total: 69,332
- Time zone: UTC+3 (Yemen Standard Time)

Ku'aydinah District (Arabic: مديرية كعيدنة) is a district of the Hajjah Governorate, Yemen. As of 2003, the district had a population of 69,332 inhabitants.
