= Ash Shaghadirah district =

Ash Shaghadirah District مديرية الشغادرة
- District
- Location within Yemen
- Coordinates: 15°35′N 43°30′E
- Country: Yemen
- Governorate: Hajjah

Population (2003)
  - Total: 48,746
- Time zone: UTC+3 (Yemen Standard Time)

Ash Shaghadirah District (Arabic: مديرية الشغادرة) is a district of the Hajjah Governorate, Yemen. As of 2003, the district had a population of 48,746 inhabitants.
