= Az'zal district =

Coordinates: 15°25′N 44°20′E

Az'zal District مديرية أزال
- District
- Interactive map of Az'zal District
- Country: Yemen
- Governorate: Amanat Al Asimah

Population (2003)
  - Total: 115,054
- Time zone: UTC+3 (Yemen Standard Time)

Az'zal District is a district of the Sana'a, Yemen. As of 2003, it had a population of 115,054.
