= Al-Mahabischa =

Hajjah Governorate

al-Mahabischa (Arabic: المحابشة) is a city of Hajjah Governorate of Yemen.

In 2004 it had a population of 15,571 and is the 28th largest town in Yemen.
