= Al Khabt district =

Al Khabt District مديرية الخبت
- District
- Location in Yemen
- Coordinates: 15°20′N 43°25′E
- Country: Yemen
- Governorate: Al Mahwit

Population (2003)
  - Total: 64,033
- Time zone: UTC+3 (Yemen Standard Time)

Al Khabt District is a district of the Al Mahwit Governorate, Yemen. As of 2003, the district had a population of 64,033 inhabitants.
