= Najrah district =

Coordinates: 15°35′N 43°37′E

Najrah District مديرية نجرة
- District
- Interactive map of Najrah District
- Country: Yemen
- Governorate: Hajjah

Population (2003)
  - Total: 35,942
- Time zone: UTC+3 (Yemen Standard Time)

Najrah District (Arabic: مديرية نجرة) is a district of the Hajjah Governorate, Yemen. As of 2003, the district had a population of 35,942 inhabitants.
