= At Tawilah district =

At Tawilah District
- District
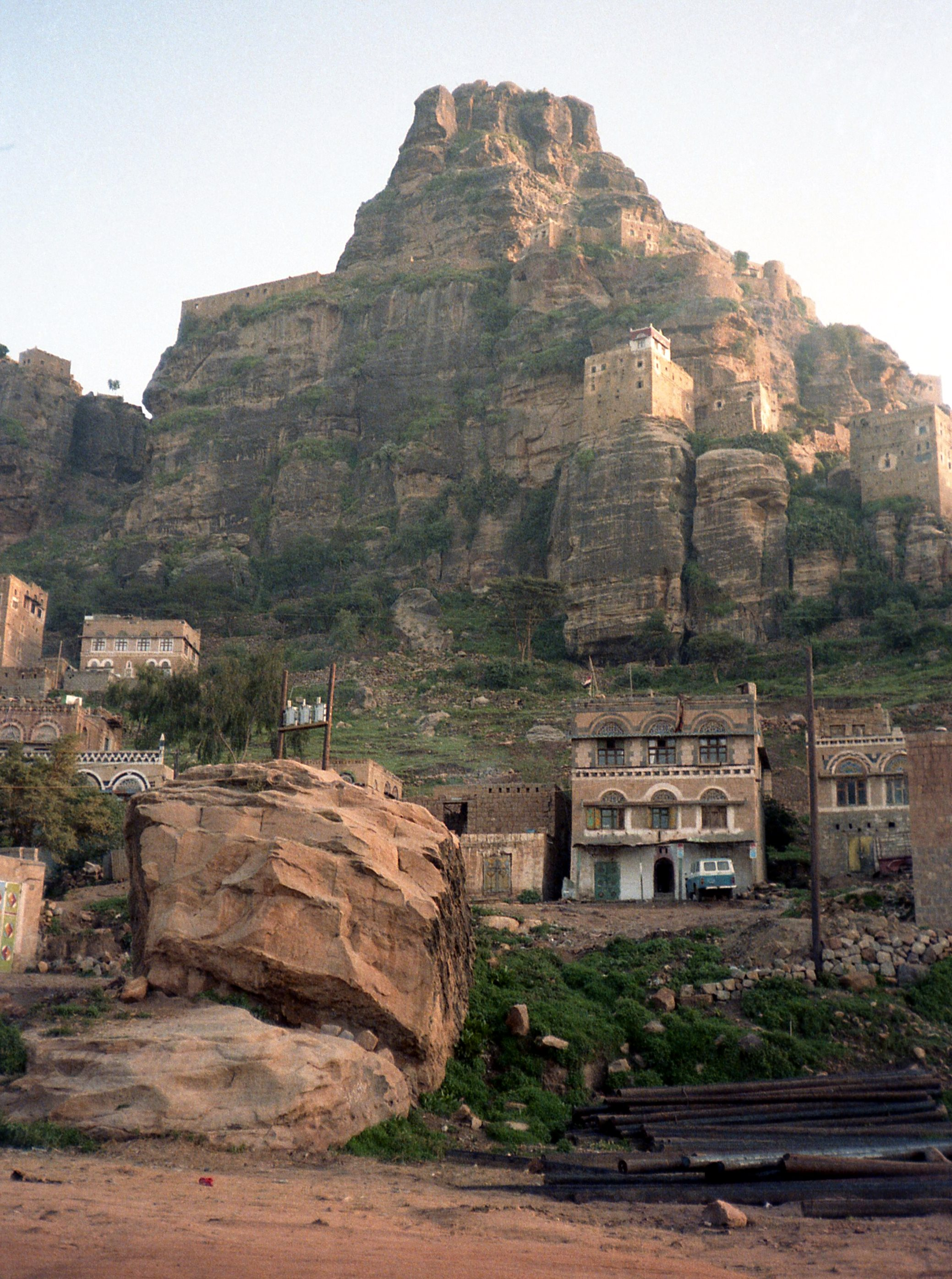

- Location in Yemen
- Coordinates: 15°26′N 43°46′E
- Country: Yemen
- Governorate: Al Mahwit

Population (2003)
  - Total: 58,862
- Time zone: UTC+3 (Yemen Standard Time)

At Tawilah District is a district of the Al Mahwit Governorate, Yemen. As of 2003, the district had a population of 58,862 inhabitants.
