= Bani Sa'd district =

Coordinates: 15°00′N 43°30′E

Bani Sa'd District مديرية بني سعد
- District
- Interactive map of Bani Sa'd District
- Country: Yemen
- Governorate: Al Mahwit

Population (2003)
  - Total: 59,015
- Time zone: UTC+3 (Yemen Standard Time)

Bani Sa'd District (مديرية بني سعد) is a district of the Al Mahwit Governorate, Yemen. As of 2003, the district had a population of 59,015 inhabitants.
