= Wadhrah district =

Coordinates: 15°50′N 43°27′E

Wadhrah District
- District
- Interactive map of Wadhrah District
- Country: Yemen
- Governorate: Hajjah

Population (2003)
  - Total: 10,928
- Time zone: UTC+3 (Yemen Standard Time)

Wadhrah District is a district of the Hajjah Governorate, Yemen. As of 2003, the district had a population of 10,928 inhabitants.
