= Ash Shahil district =

Coordinates: 15.8553°N 43.4514°E

Ash Shahil District مديرية الشاهل
- District
- Interactive map of Ash Shahil District
- Country: Yemen
- Governorate: Hajjah

Population (2003)
  - Total: 32,548
- Time zone: UTC+3 (Yemen Standard Time)

Ash Shahil District (Arabic: مديرية الشاهل) is a district of the Hajjah Governorate, Yemen. As of 2003, the district had a population of 32,548 inhabitants.
