= Hufash district =

Coordinates: 15°10′N 43°28′E

Hufash District
- District
- Interactive map of Hufash District
- Country: Yemen
- Governorate: Al Mahwit

Population (2003)
  - Total: 37,884
- Time zone: UTC+3 (Yemen Standard Time)

Hufash District is a district of the Al Mahwit Governorate, Yemen. As of 2003, the district had a population of 37,884 inhabitants.
