= Dimnat Chadir =

City in Tiaz, Yemen

Ta'izz Governorate

Dimnat Chadir is a city in Dimnat Khadir District, Tiaz Governorate of Yemen.

In 2005, it had a population of 25,763 inhabitants and is the 26th largest town in Yemen.
