= Washhah district =

Coordinates: 16°15′N 43°20′E

Washhah District
- District
- Interactive map of Washhah District
- Country: Yemen
- Governorate: Hajjah Governorate

Population (2003)
  - Total: 62,617
- Time zone: UTC+3 (Yemen Standard Time)

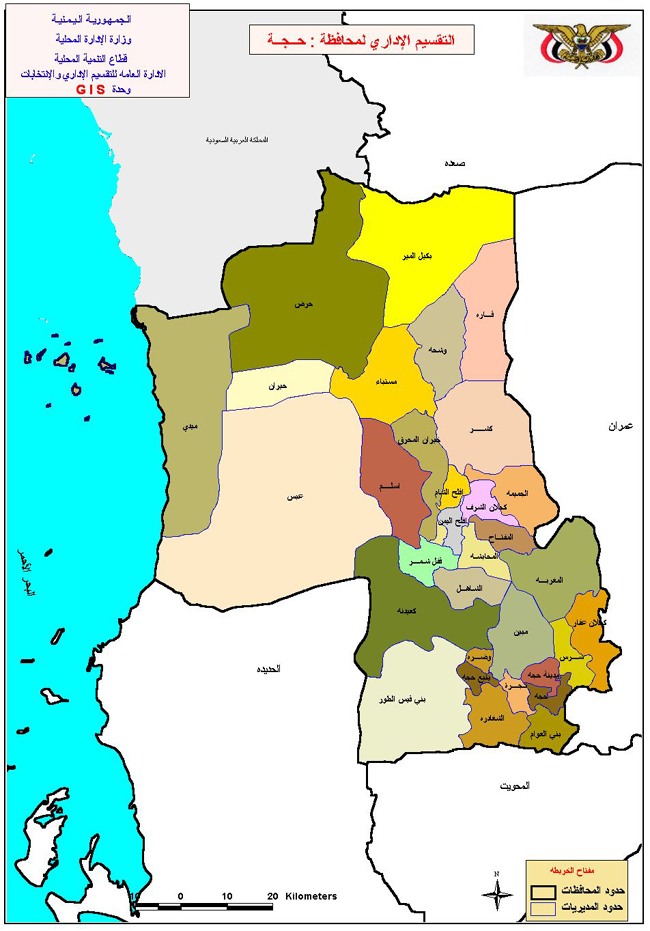

Washhah District is a district of the Hajjah Governorate, Yemen. As of 2003, the district had a population of 62,617 people.
