= Az Zaydiyah district =

Coordinates: 15°07′N 43°08′E

Az Zaydiyah District
- District
- Interactive map of Az Zaydiyah District
- Country: Yemen
- Governorate: Al Hudaydah

Population (2003)
  - Total: 95,048
- Time zone: UTC+3 (Yemen Standard Time)

Az Zaydiyah District is a district of the Al Hudaydah Governorate, Yemen. As of 2003, the district had a population of 95,048 inhabitants.
