= Al-Marawi'a =

Coordinates: 14°49′54″N 43°09′18″E

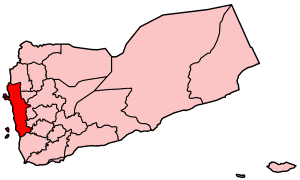
Al Hudaydah Governorate

al-Marawi'a (المراوعة) is a city in Al Marawi'ah District in Al Hudaydah Governorate of Yemen.

== History ==
In 2005, it had a population of 39,911 inhabitants and is the 19th largest town in Yemen.

In 2024, a project was announced to establish a community mill.
