= Milhan district =

Coordinates: 15.3222°N 43.3317°E

Milhan District
- District
- Interactive map of Milhan District
- Country: Yemen
- Governorate: Al Mahwit

Population (2003)
  - Total: 89,224
- Time zone: UTC+3 (Yemen Standard Time)

Milhan District is a district of the Al Mahwit Governorate, Yemen. As of 2003, the district had a population of 89,224 inhabitants.
