= Hayran district =

Coordinates: 16°05′N 43°05′E

Hayran District مديرية حيران
- District
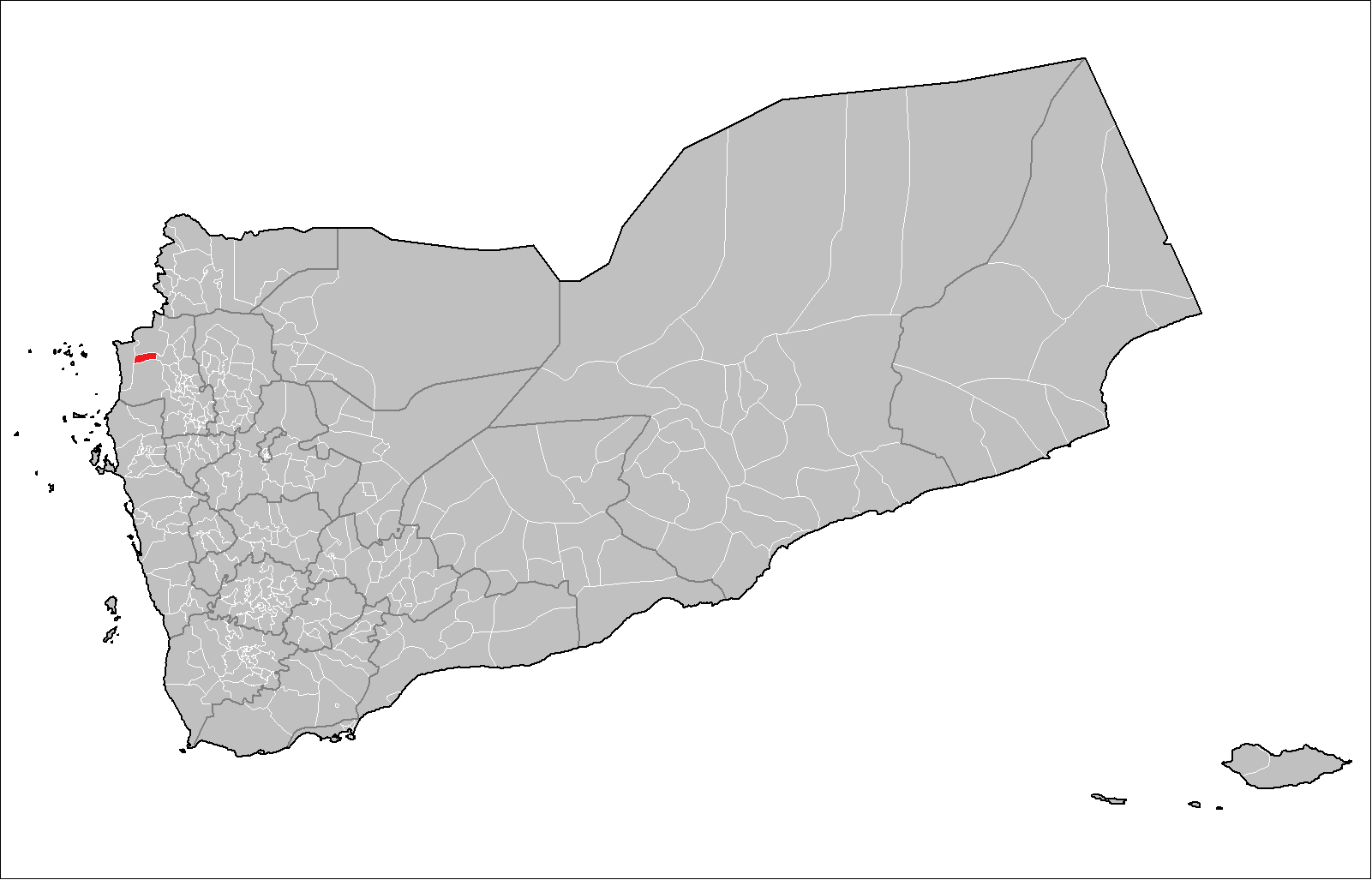
- Country: Yemen
- Governorate: Hajjah Governorate

Population (2003)
  - Total: 15,491
- Time zone: UTC+3 (Yemen Standard Time)

Hayran District (Arabic: مديرية حيران) is a district of the Hajjah Governorate, Yemen. As of 2003, the district had a population of 15,491 people.
