= Sayyan =

Town in Sanaa Governorate, Yemen

- Town
- Location in Yemen
- Coordinates: 15°10′25″N 44°19′44″E
- Country: Yemen
- Governorate: San‘a’ Governorate
- Time zone: UTC+3 (Yemen Standard Time)

Sayyan is a small town in western central Yemen. It is located in the San‘a’ Governorate, to the southeast by road from Sana'a along Route 901.

Infrastructure like in many other areas of western Yemen was improved in the late 1980s and early 1990s; Swedish company Transelectric and the Yemen General Electricity Corporation (YGEC) laid feeder and distribution lines and substations in the Sayyan vicinity, reportedly completed in late 1991. It contains a hospital, mosque and a school.
