= Nakhlah Wadi =

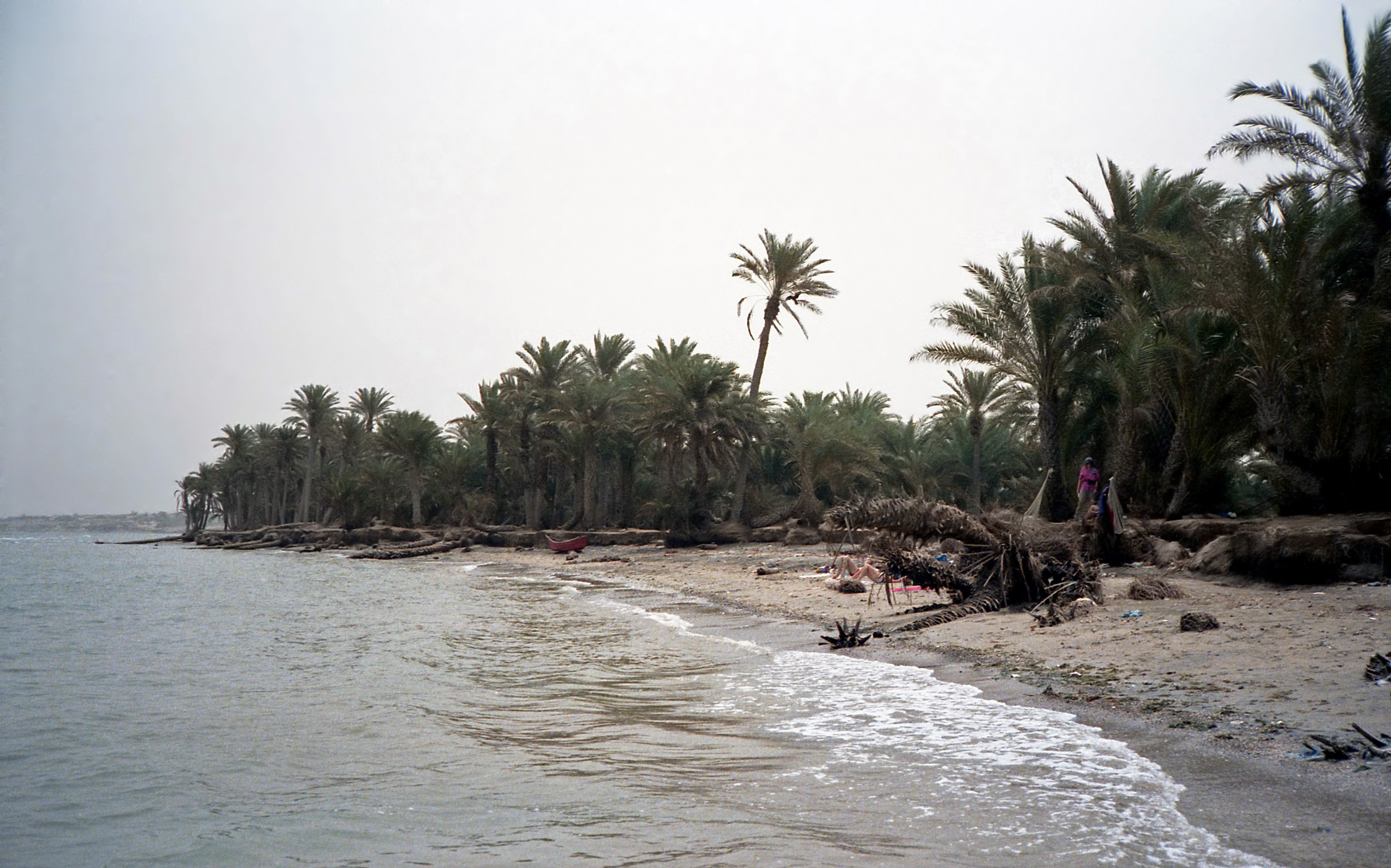
Wādī Nakhlah flows into the Red Sea at Khawkhah.

Wādī Nakhlah is a wadi and is located at 14.00185 ° N 44.0001°E in Al Ḩudaydah, Yemen.

It flows from the Mountains of the Yemen Highlands, at 395 meters height, past Al Jarrahi, Yemen, Zabid, At Tuhayta across the Tihamah Coastal plain and into the Red Sea at Al Fazah, near resort town of Khawkhah.
