= Al Mahwait district =

Al Mahwait District مديرية المحويت
- District
- Location in Yemen
- Coordinates: 15°23′N 43°34′E
- Country: Yemen
- Governorate: Al Mahwit

Population (2003)
  - Total: 50,526
- Time zone: UTC+3 (Yemen Standard Time)

Al Mahwait District (Arabic: مديرية المحويت) is a district of the Al Mahwit Governorate, Yemen. As of 2003, the district had a population of 50,526 inhabitants.
