= Dhat al-Riqa =

Location in Saudi Arabia

Dhat al-Riqa is a location in Saudi Arabia. During the Islamic Prophet Muhammad's era the Expedition of Dhat al-Riqa took place here because Muhammed received the news that certain tribes of Banu Ghatafan were assembling at Dhat al-Riqa with suspicious purposes.

Muhammad proceeded towards Nejd at the head of 400 or 700 men, after he had mandated Abu Dhar - in the Umayyad version, the Umayyad chief who killed Abu Dhar is given this honor: Uthman ibn Affan - to dispose the affairs of Madinah during his absence. The Muslim fighters penetrated deep into their land until they reached a spot called Nakhlah where they came across some bedouins of Ghatfan. 2 Quran verses 5:11 and 4:101 are related to this event.

== See also ==
- List of battles of Muhammad
