= Ath'thaorah district =

Coordinates: 15.3908°N 44.1928°E

Ath'thaorah District
- District
- Interactive map of Ath'thaorah District
- Country: Yemen
- Governorate: Amanat Al Asimah

Population (2003)
  - Total: 170,145
- Time zone: UTC+3 (Yemen Standard Time)

Ath'thaorah District is a district of the Amanat Al Asimah Governorate, Yemen. As of 2003, the district had a population of 170,145 inhabitants.
