= Al Mahwit =

Al Mahwit المحويت City
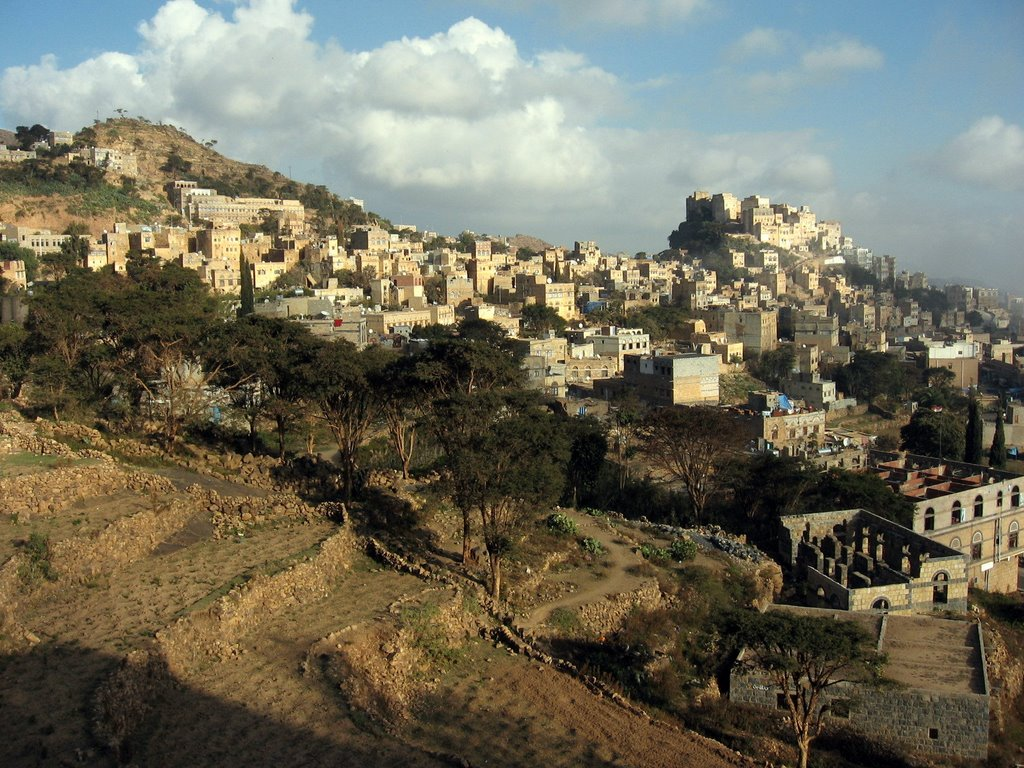

- Location in Yemen
- Coordinates: 15°28′10″N 43°32′43″E
- Country: Yemen
- Governorate: Al Mahwit
- District: Al Mahwit

Population (2012)
  - Total: 16,291

Al Mahwit (Arabic: المحويت Al-Maḥwīt) is the capital city of Al Mahwit Governorate, Yemen. It is located at an elevation of about 2,000 metres or 6,600 feet.

== The History ==
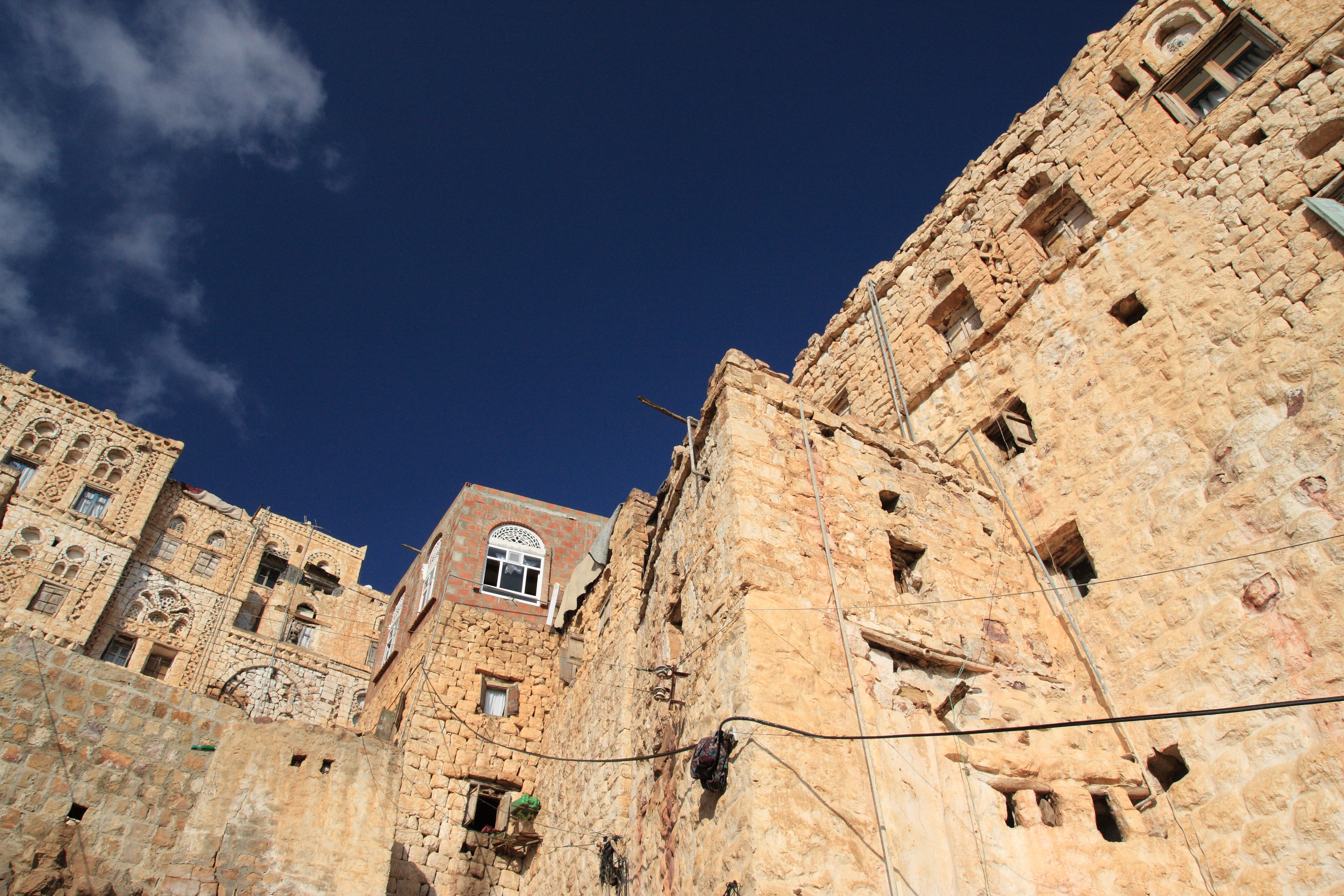
Al Mahwit

Al-Mahwit's development is fairly recent compared to some other Yemeni settlements. Its first known historical mention is in 1599 (1007 AH), in the Ghayat al-amani of Yahya ibn al-Husayn.

The old town of Al-Mahwit is situated around a mountain fortress. Until the 1970s, Al Mahwit was extremely isolated. The town had a population of about 10,000 in the early 1980s, after which infrastructure was developed and water, sanitation and electricity added.

== Geography ==
The area is mountainous, set in the Haraz Mountains and attracts trekkers. Al-Mahwit is surrounded by several wadis such as Wadi Sama'a, Wadi Eyan, Wadi Juma't Saria, Wadi Hawar, Wadi Bour, Wadi Al- Hawdh, Wadi Thabab, Wadi Laa'a, Wadi Al-Ahjer and Wadi Naa'wan. Numerous villages are spread in the area that were built on and around rocks.

=== Climate ===
Al Mawhit has a cool arid climate (Köppen climate classification: BWk) with warm days and cool nights, typical of Yemen's highlands. Rain is concentrated in spring and summer, with a dry gap between the two rainy seasons. April, July and August are the only months with significant rainfall.

Climate data for Al Mahwit
Month	Jan	Feb	Mar	Apr	May	Jun	Jul	Aug	Sep	Oct	Nov	Dec	Year
Mean daily maximum °C (°F)	22.6 (72.7)	24.8 (76.6)	25.7 (78.3)	25.4 (77.7)	26.7 (80.1)	29.0 (84.2)	27.4 (81.3)	27.0 (80.6)	26.4 (79.5)	23.5 (74.3)	21.6 (70.9)	21.1 (70.0)	25.1 (77.2)
Daily mean °C (°F)	13.8 (56.8)	15.4 (59.7)	17.2 (63.0)	17.8 (64.0)	19.3 (66.7)	20.7 (69.3)	21.1 (70.0)	20.9 (69.6)	19.3 (66.7)	16.7 (62.1)	14.5 (58.1)	13.6 (56.5)	17.5 (63.5)
Mean daily minimum °C (°F)	5.1 (41.2)	6.0 (42.8)	8.7 (47.7)	10.2 (50.4)	12.0 (53.6)	12.5 (54.5)	14.8 (58.6)	14.8 (58.6)	12.2 (54.0)	9.9 (49.8)	7.5 (45.5)	6.1 (43.0)	10.0 (50.0)
Average rainfall mm (inches)	8 (0.3)	11 (0.4)	27 (1.1)	51 (2.0)	29 (1.1)	7 (0.3)	46 (1.8)	71 (2.8)	16 (0.6)	5 (0.2)	10 (0.4)	8 (0.3)	289 (11.3)
Source: Climate-Data.org

== Economy ==
The area and surrounding governorate depends on agriculture, mainly the production of coffee, tobacco, corn, sorghum and qat.
