= Al Khawkhah district =

Al Khawkhah District مديرية الخوخة
- District
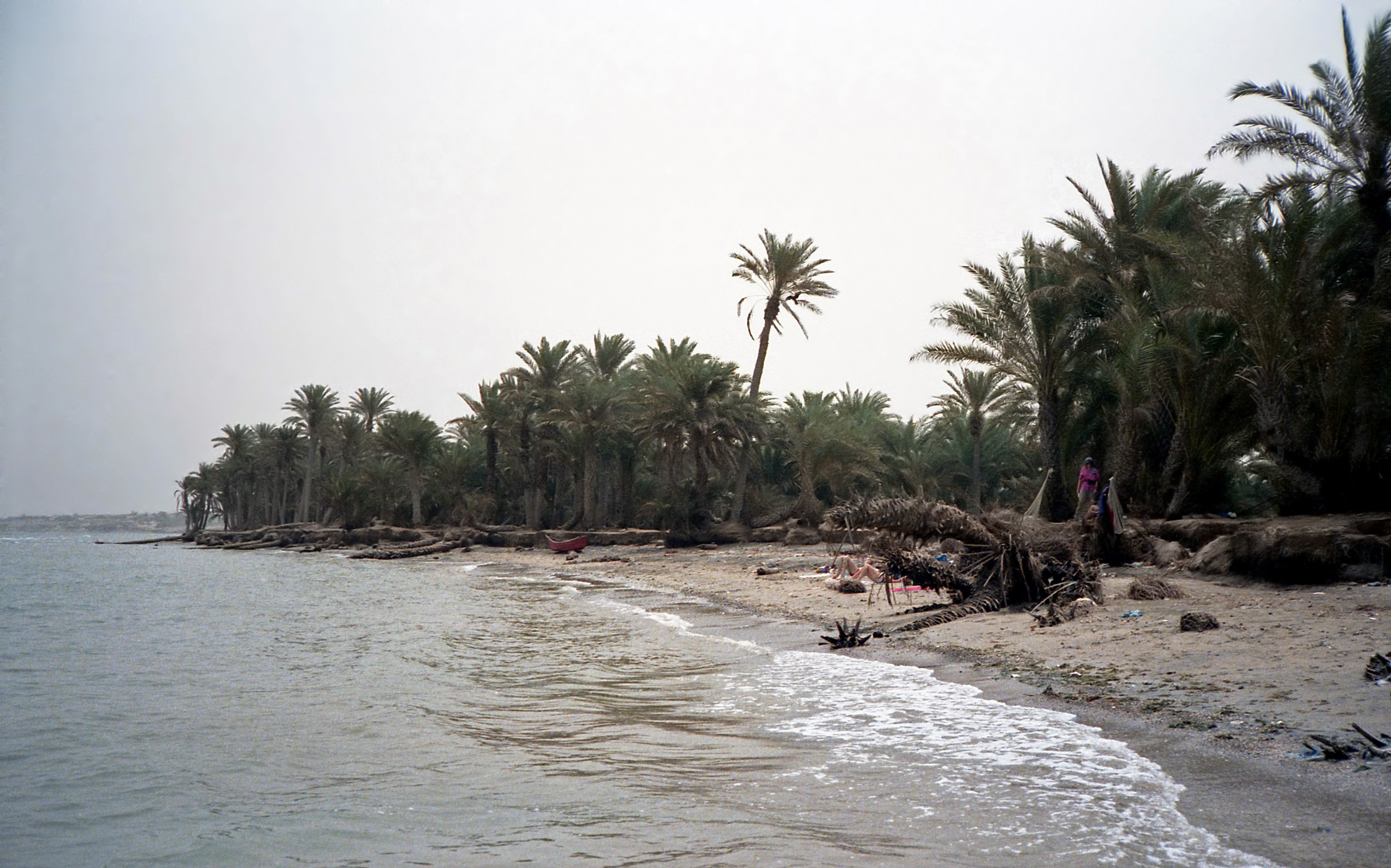
- Beach at Al Khawkhah

- Location in Yemen
- Coordinates: 13.8065°N 43.2484°E
- Country: Yemen
- Governorate: Al Hudaydah

Population (2003)
  - Total: 33,764
- Time zone: UTC+3 (Yemen Standard Time)

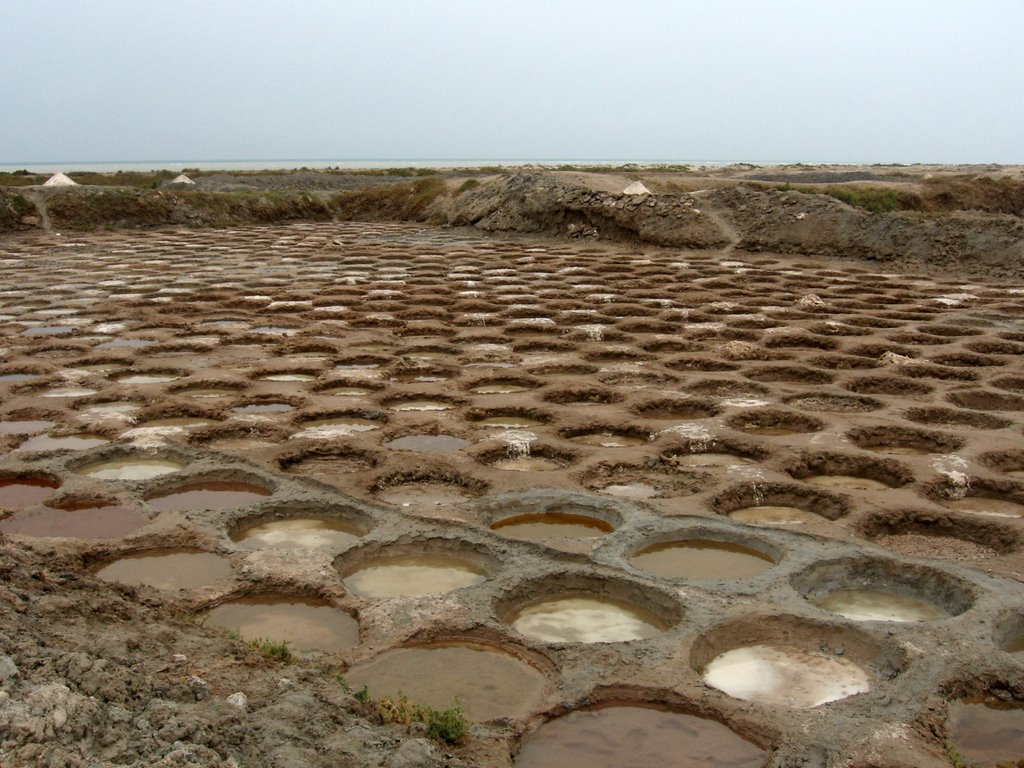
Saltworks on the road from Al-Khawkha to al Mokka in 2006

Al Khawkhah District (Arabic: مديرية الخوخة) is a district of the Al Hudaydah Governorate, Yemen. As of 2003, the district had a population of 33,764 inhabitants.

== See also ==
- Tihamah
