= Ad Dahi district =

Coordinates: 15°05′N 43°10′E

Ad Dahi district مديرية الضحي
- District
- Interactive map of Ad Dahi district
- Country: Yemen
- Governorate: Al Hudaydah

Population (2003)
  - Total: 54,503
- Time zone: UTC+3 (Yemen Standard Time)

Ad Dahi district (Arabic: مديرية الضحي) is a district of the Al Hudaydah Governorate, Yemen. In 2003, the district had a population of 54,503.

== Cities ==
- Ad-Dahi

== Geography ==
The district contains the hills Jabal al Maḩāriq, Jabal al Minjārah, Jabal al Qāhirī, Kabbat al Ḩamrā' and Kabbat al Manşabah, and the wadis Wādī al Mūsīyah, Wādī Kusr and Wādī Namir.
