= Al-Mahwit Governorate =

Governorate of Yemen

Coordinates: 16°15′N 44°43′E

Al Mahwit ٱلْمَحْوِيْت
- Governorate
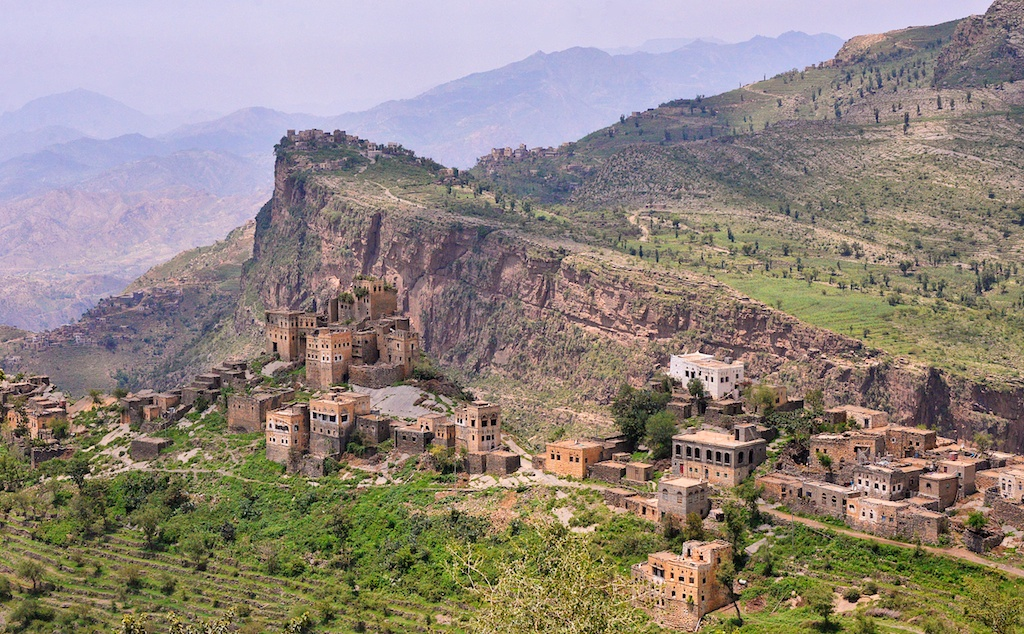

- Country: Yemen
- Region: Tihama Region
- Seat: Al Mahwit

Area
  - Total: 2,328 km^{2} (899 sq mi)

Population (2025 est.)
  - Total: 841,568
  - Density: 361.5/km^{2} (936.3/sq mi)

Al Mahwit (Arabic: ٱلْمَحْوِيْت Al-Maḥwīt) is one of the governorates of Yemen. Located in the western highlands, northwest of the national capital Sana'a, it covers an area of approximately 2,328 km^{2} (899 sq mi) and is subdivided into nine districts. Its administrative centre is Al Mahwit. According to the 2004 census, it had a population of 494,557, and had an estimated population of 841,568 in 2025.

== History ==
There are several archeological sites in the governorate. The Shibam Kawkaban archaeological site dates back to seventh century BCE and contains several rock-cut tombs and inscriptions. Located along the Mount Kawkaban, it was a major center during the Sabaean and Himyarite kingdoms and subsequently developed into an important centre of Islam. During the early Islamic period, it became the capital of the Yu'firid dynasty, which ruled Yemen between 839 and 997 and the Great Mosque of Shibam was built in the ninth century. The Old Town of Al Mahwit is another historic settlement in the governorate.

== Geography ==
Al Mahwit is one of the governorates of Yemen. It is situated approximately 113 km (70 mi) northwest of the national capital Sana'a. It is bordered by Hajjah Governorate to the north, Hodeidah Governorate to the west, and Sana'a Governorate to the east and south. Al Mahwit city is the capital of the govenorate. It occupies an area of approximately 2,328 km^{2} (899 sq mi).

The governorate lies at an elevation of approximately 2,100 m (6,900 ft) above sea level. It experiences a varied climate with the mountainous areas experiencing mild summers and cold winters, while the lower areas adjoining the Tihamah plains experiencing hot summers and mild winters.

== Administration and sub-divisions ==
The governorate is administered by a local council consisting of 20 members and the governor. Al Mahwit Governorate is divided into nine districts.

Districts
District	Size (km²)	Population (2025 est.)		
District	Size (km²)	Female	Male	Total
Shibam Kawkaban	399	32,158	33,285	65,443
At Tawilah	585	44,502	46,063	90,565
Ar Rujum	766	60,783	62,917	123,700
Al Khabt	641	54,774	56,693	111,467
Milhan	891	72,514	75,058	147,572
Hufash	379	31,879	32,997	64,876
Bani Sa'd	591	49,478	51,215	100,693
Al Mahwit City	202	23,701	24,537	48,238
Al Mahwait	506	43,740	45,274	89,014
Total	2,328	413,529	428,039	841,568

== Demographics ==
According to the 2004 population census, Al Mahwit Governorate had a population of 494,557. The population was estimated to be 597,000 in 2011. According to a 2025 report, the governorate had an estimated population of 841,568, of which 428,039 were males and 413,529 were females.

== Economy ==
Agriculture is the principal economic activity and the governorate contributes to approximately 2.2% of Yemen's total agricultural output. Major crops include cereals and fruits apart from other cash crops. Other produce include honey. A World Bank-supported agricultural development project identified Al Mahwit among five governorates selected for interventions in rain-fed agriculture and livestock production. Other industries include handicrafts, manufacture of glass and pottery, and processing of marble, and granite.

In 2014, about 60.7% of the population was living in poverty. According to the 2014 local authority budget, locally generated revenues including taxes accounted for only 3% and grants and central government subsidies accounted for 97% of the budget. The income was further projected to decrease due to the Yemeni Civil War.

== Infrastructure and services ==
In 2016–2017, approximately 42% of households in the governorate had access to potable water. The public water supply often experienced interruptions because of shortages of funding, resulting in greater reliance on private sources. The government operates hospitals and schools, though they have suffered damage and from lack of funding due to the war. Local communities engaged in rehabilitation of infrastructure such as roads in Al Mahwait.
