= Hajjah district =

Hajjah District مُدِيْرِيَّة حَجَّة
- District
- Location of Hajjah District Hajjah District (Asia)
- Country: Yemen
- Governorate: Hajjah

Population (2003)
  - Total: 29,533
- Time zone: UTC+3 (Yemen Standard Time)

Hajjah District (Arabic: مُدِيْرِيَّة حَجَّة, romanized: Mudīriyyat Ḥajjah) is a district of the Hajjah Governorate, Yemen. As of 2003, the district had a population of 29,533 inhabitants.

== History ==
Albeit enjoying peace between 2013 and the end of December 2018, despite the war that has engulfed other parts of the country, the area of Hajour has witnessed intense fighting between Houthis vying for control of the area and local tribes with whom they earlier agreed to cease hostilities that had occurred in 2012 and 2013.
