= Tabalah, Yemen =

Coordinates: 14°49′N 49°35′E

Tabalah
- Interactive map of Tabalah
- Country: Yemen
- Governorate: Hadhramaut
- Time zone: UTC+3 (Yemen Standard Time)

Tabalah is a village in eastern Yemen. It is located in the Hadhramaut Governorate.
