= Hajjah =

Hajjah حَجَّة
- City
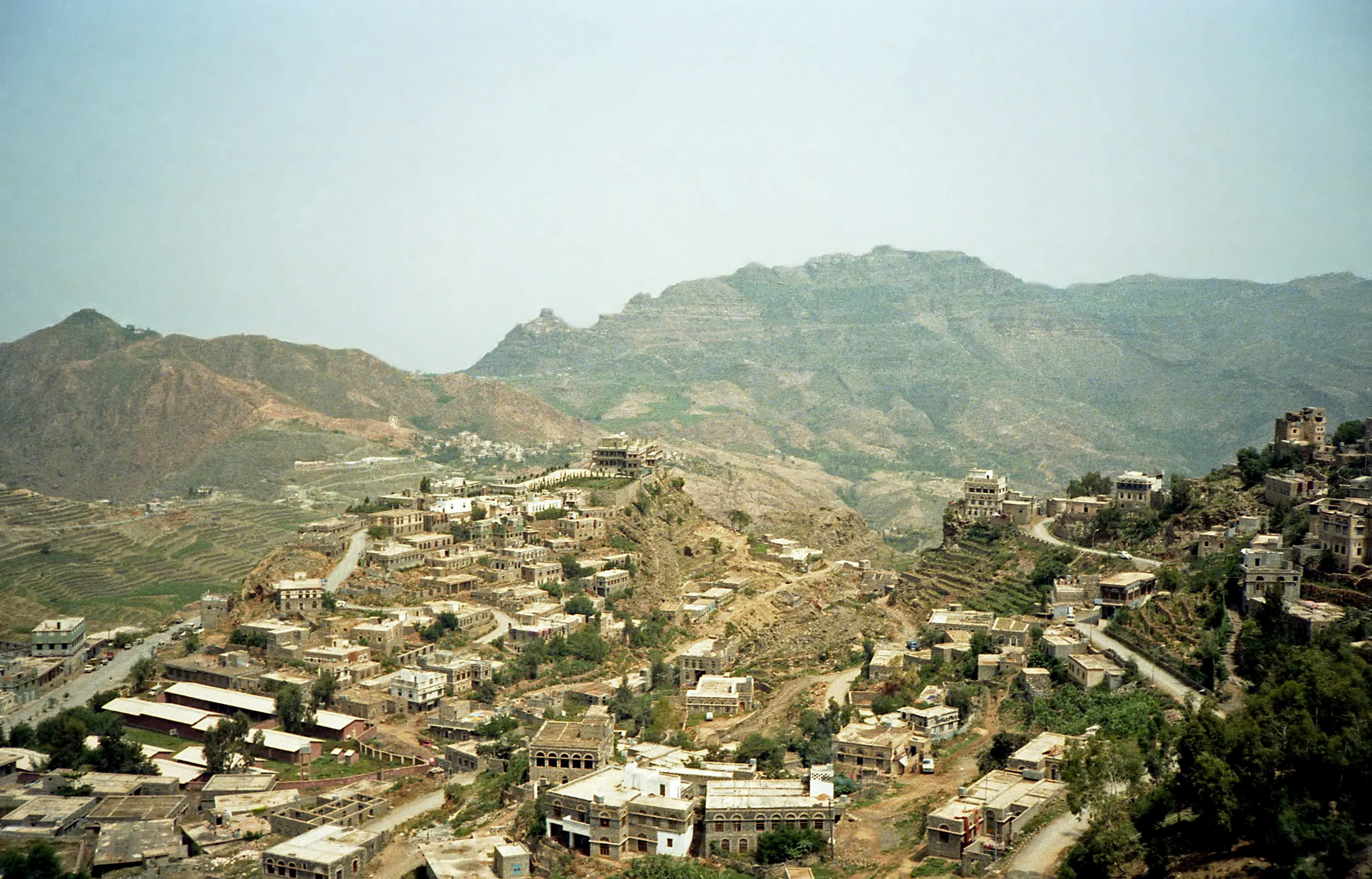

- Location in Yemen
- Coordinates: 15°41′42″N 43°35′51″E
- Country: Yemen
- Governorate: Hajjah
- District: Hajjah

Population
  - Total: 53,887
- Time zone: UTC+3 (Yemen Standard Time)

Hajjah (Arabic: حَجَّة, romanized: Ḥajjah) is the capital city of Hajjah Governorate in north-western Yemen. It is located 127 kilometres or 79 miles northwest of Sanaa, at an elevation of about 1,800 metres or 5,900 feet. As of 2003, the Hajjah City District had a population of 53,887 inhabitants.

== Etymology ==
According to Arab traditions, the name Hajjah came from Hajjah Ibn Aslam Ibn Ali Ibn Hashid. Some traditions say that Hajjah was also called Hajour, all the tribes in Hajjah are branches from Hajour tribe.

== History ==
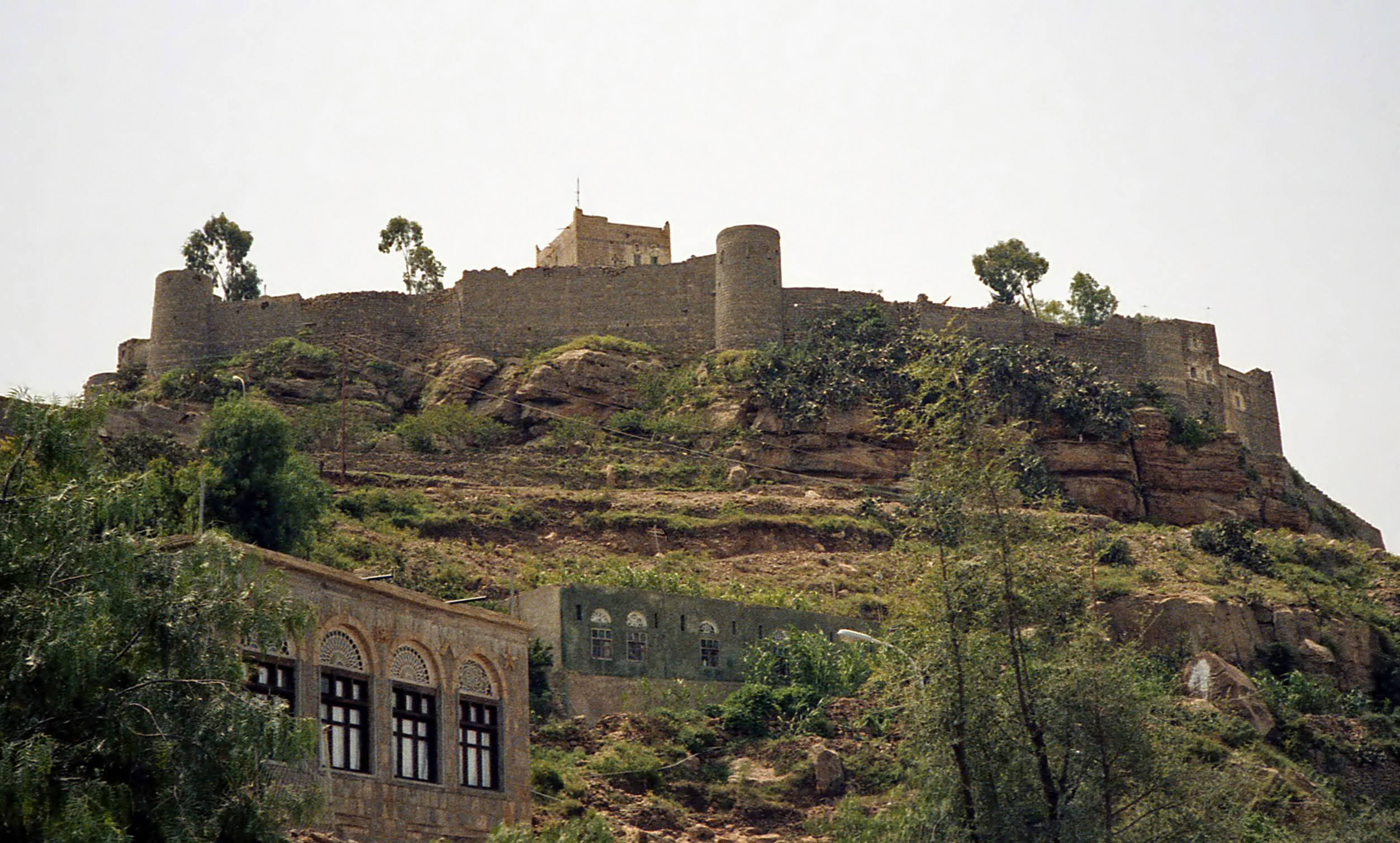
Hajjah fortress

Carsten Niebuhr's 18th-century map of Yemen, showing the region of Belled Hadsj at upper left

Historically, the name Hajjah referred to a district rather than a town. It was the mountainous region around the modern town, stretching northward towards al-Zafir, and separated from the mountain formations to the east, west, and north by the Wadi Sharis and the Wadi Mawr. There were numerous forts in this area during the Middle Ages. The 10th-century writer al-Hamdani counted Hajjah as part of the broader districts of Sarāt Qudam or Sarāt al-Maṣāniʽ, with Hajjah appearing to be on the border between the two. He wrote that its population mostly belonged to the Qudam tribe, and that its name was derived from one Ḥajjah b. Aslam b. ‘Aliyyān b. Zayd, of the tribe of Hashid. Other medieval writers to mention Hajjah include Muhammad ibn Salah al-Sharafi and Yahya ibn al-Husayn. The area's suq, which belonged to the Hashid tribe, may have been at the site of the modern town, but the roads in the area appear to have been different in the middle ages, based on Hamdani's description, so this is uncertain.

During the 1700s, Hajjah still referred mainly to the geographical region, as shown by the map drawn by Carsten Niebuhr in the 1700s, which shows a region called "Belled Hadsj" rather than a town by that name. By the time Eduard Glaser visited in the late 1800s, however, the modern town of Hajjah had begun to develop. Its population in the census of 1975 was 5,613.

== Climate ==
Hajjah has a hot semi-arid climate (Köppen BSh) moderated by altitude. Afternoons are hot to sweltering throughout the year, although less extreme than on the coast, but mornings are generally pleasantly cool. Rainfall has two peaks in April and August at around 100 millimetres or 4 inches per month, and totals around 470 millimetres or 18.5 inches per year.

Climate data for Hajjah
Month	Jan	Feb	Mar	Apr	May	Jun	Jul	Aug	Sep	Oct	Nov	Dec	Year
Mean daily maximum °C (°F)	29.6 (85.3)	31.0 (87.8)	33.9 (93.0)	32.3 (90.1)	33.7 (92.7)	34.2 (93.6)	36.3 (97.3)	33.9 (93.0)	35.0 (95.0)	35.1 (95.2)	33.1 (91.6)	31.4 (88.5)	33.3 (91.9)
Daily mean °C (°F)	20.5 (68.9)	22.1 (71.8)	24.0 (75.2)	24.2 (75.6)	25.0 (77.0)	26.2 (79.2)	26.5 (79.7)	26.5 (79.7)	25.5 (77.9)	24.3 (75.7)	18.1 (64.6)	19.9 (67.8)	23.6 (74.4)
Mean daily minimum °C (°F)	11.5 (52.7)	13.2 (55.8)	15.3 (59.5)	15.2 (59.4)	16.1 (61.0)	17.0 (62.6)	17.7 (63.9)	17.2 (63.0)	14.6 (58.3)	13.0 (55.4)	11.6 (52.9)	11.4 (52.5)	14.5 (58.1)
Average rainfall mm (inches)	12 (0.5)	21 (0.8)	36 (1.4)	110 (4.3)	39 (1.5)	26 (1.0)	45 (1.8)	101 (4.0)	38 (1.5)	0 (0)	11 (0.4)	29 (1.1)	468 (18.4)
Average relative humidity (%)	62	61	59	60	63	48	58	59	57	51	53	63	58
Mean daily sunshine hours	9.5	9.8	9.0	11.1	11.6	11.9	9.2	10.4	10.7	10.5	9.6	8.6	10.2
Source: Arab Meteorology Book
