= Harad district =

Coordinates: 16°15′N 43°05′E

Harad District مديرية حرض
- District
- Yemen and Southern Arabian Peninsula
- Country: Yemen
- Governorate: Hajjah

Population (2003)
  - Total: 93,523
- Time zone: UTC+3 (Yemen Standard Time)

Harad District (Arabic: مديرية حرض, romanized: Mudīriyya Ḥaraḍ) is a district of the Hajjah Governorate, Yemen. As of 2003, the district had a population of 93,523 inhabitants.
