= 'Uzlah =

Local administrative division of Yemen

'Uzlah (Arabic: عزلة, plural 'Uzaal; Arabic: عزل) is the name of a tier in Yemen's regional administrative divisions. The 'uzlah was originally a sub-division of a mikhlaf, another type of administrative division. However, the mikhleef system is no longer used by the government so the 'uzlah is now an administrative sub-division of a district.

== Etymology ==
In Arabic, the word 'uzlah means remoteness or loneliness.
