= List of districts of Yemen =

The governorates of Yemen are divided into 333 districts (as of 2019) (Arabic: مديريات, romanized: mudīriyyāt). The districts are subdivided into 2,210 Uzaal (sub-districts), and then into 38,284 villages (as of 2001). The districts are listed below, by governorate:

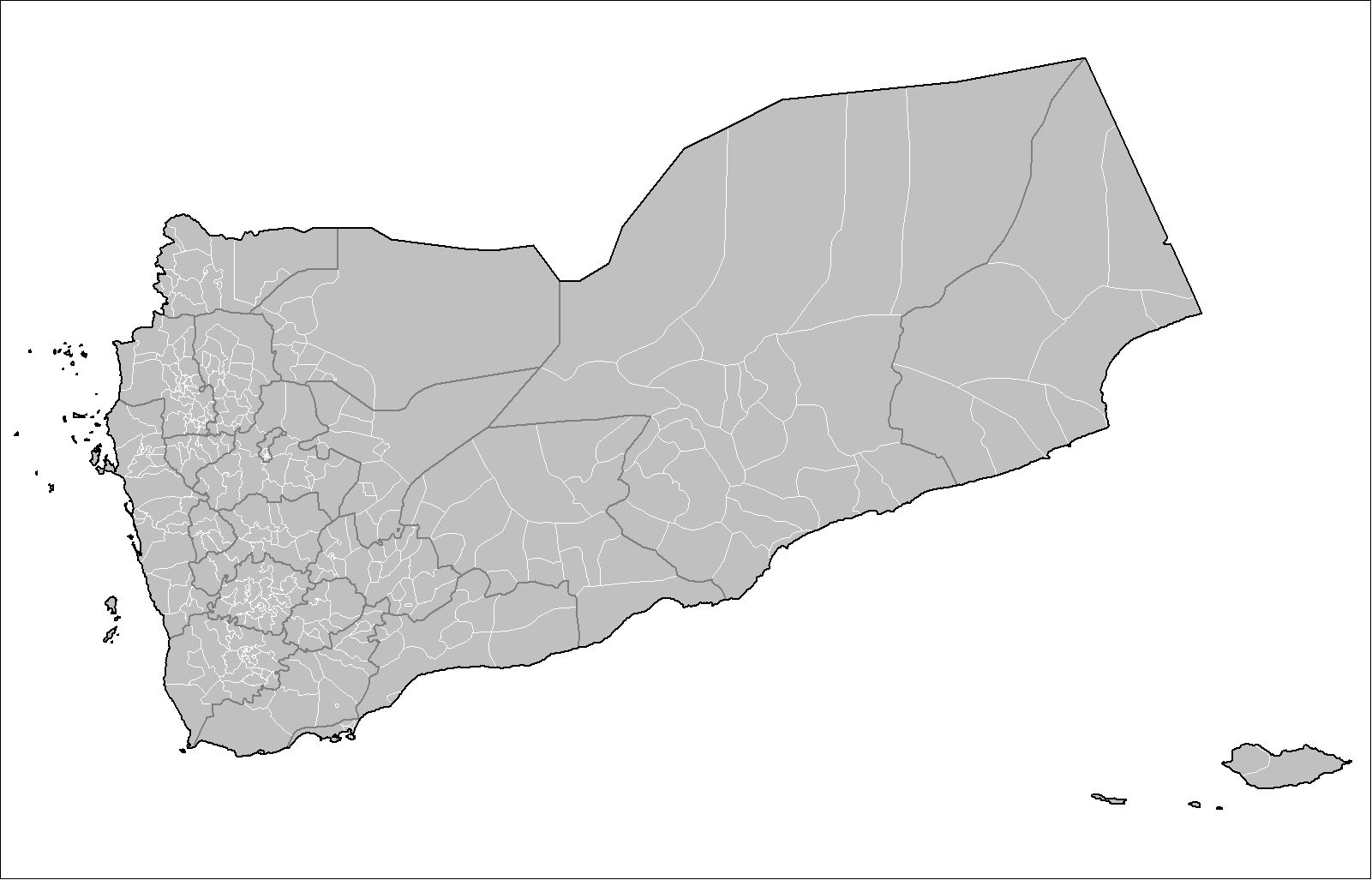
Districts of Yemen

== 'Aden Governorate ==
- Al Buraiqa district
- Al Mansura district
- Mualla district
- Sheikh Othman district
- Tawahi district
- Crater district
- Dar Sad district
- Khur Maksar district

== 'Amran Governorate ==
- Al Ashah district
- Al Madan district
- Al Qaflah district
- Amran district
- As Sawd district
- As Sudah district
- Bani Suraim district
- Dhi Bin district
- Habur Zulaymah district
- Harf Sufyan district
- Huth district
- Iyal Surayh district
- Jabal Iyal Yazid district
- Khamir district
- Kharif district
- Maswar district
- Raydah district
- Shaharah district
- Suwayr district
- Thula district

== Abyan Governorate ==
- Ahwar district
- Al Mahfad district
- Al Wade'a district
- Jayshan district
- Khanfir district
- Lawdar district
- Mudiyah district
- Rasad district
- Sarar district
- Sibah district
- Zingibar district

== Ad Dali' Governorate ==
- Ad Dhale'e district
- Al Azariq district
- Al Husha district
- Al Hussein district
- Ash Shu'ayb district
- Damt district
- Jahaf district
- Juban district
- Qa'atabah district

== Al Bayda' Governorate ==
- Al A'rsh district
- Al Bayda district
- Al Bayda City district
- Al Malagim district
- Al Quraishyah district
- Ar Ryashyyah district
- As Sawadiyah district
- As Sawma'ah district
- Ash Sharyah district
- At Taffah district
- Az Zahir district
- Dhi Na'im district
- Maswarah district
- Mukayras district
- Na'man district
- Nati' district
- Rada' district
- Radman Al Awad district
- Sabah district
- Wald Rabi' district

== Al Hudaydah Governorate ==
- Ad Dahi district
- Ad Durayhimi district
- Al Garrahi district
- Al Hajjaylah district
- Al Hali district
- Al Hawak district
- Al Khawkhah district
- Al Mansuriyah district
- Al Marawi'ah district
- Al Mighlaf district
- Al Mina district
- Al Munirah district
- Al Qanawis district
- Alluheyah district
- As Salif district
- As Sukhnah district
- At Tuhayat district
- Az Zaydiyah district
- Az Zuhrah district
- Bajil district
- Bayt al-Faqih district
- Bura district
- Hays district
- Jabal Ra's district
- Kamaran district
- Zabid district

== Al Jawf Governorate ==
- Al Ghayl district
- Al Hazm district
- Al Humaydat district
- Al Khalq district
- Al Maslub district
- Al Matammah district
- Al Maton district
- Az Zahir district
- Bart Al Anan district
- Khabb wa ash Sha'af district
- Kharab Al Marashi district
- Rajuzah district

== Al Mahrah Governorate ==
- Al Ghaydah district
- Al Masilah district
- Hat district
- Hawf district
- Huswain district
- Man'ar district
- Qishn district
- Sayhut district
- Shahan district

== Al Mahwit Governorate ==
- Al Khabt district
- Al Mahwait district
- Al Mahwait City district
- Ar Rujum district
- At Tawilah district
- Bani Sa'd district
- Hufash district
- Milhan district
- Shibam Kawkaban district

== Amanat Al Asimah Governorate ==
- Al Wahdah district
- As Sabain district
- Assafi'yah district
- At Tahrir district
- Ath'thaorah district
- Az'zal district
- Bani Al Harith district
- Ma'ain district
- Old City district
- Shu'aub district

== Dhamar Governorate ==
- Al Hada district
- Al Manar district
- Anss district
- Dawran Aness district
- Dhamar City district
- Jabal Ash sharq district
- Jahran district
- Maghirib Ans district
- Mayfa'at Anss district
- Utmah district
- Wusab Al Ali district
- Wusab As Safil district

== Hadhramaut Governorate ==
- Ad Dis district
- Adh Dhlia'ah district
- Al Abr district
- Mukalla district
- Mukalla City district
- Al Qaf district
- Al Qatn district
- Amd district
- Ar Raydah Wa Qusayar district
- As Sawm district
- Ash Shihr district
- Brom Mayfa district
- Daw'an district
- Ghayl Ba Wazir district
- Ghayl Bin Yamin district
- Hagr As Sai'ar district
- Hajr district
- Hawrah district
- Huraidhah district
- Rakhyah district
- Rumah district
- Sah district
- Sayun district
- Shibam district
- Tarim district
- Thamud district
- Yabuth district
- Zamakh wa Manwakh district

== Hajjah Governorate ==
- Abs district
- Aflah Al Yaman district
- Aflah Ash Shawm district
- Al Jamimah district
- Al Maghrabah district
- Al Mahabishah district
- Al Miftah district
- Ash Shaghadirah district
- Ash Shahil district
- Aslem district
- Bakil Al Mir district
- Bani Al Awam district
- Bani Qa'is district
- Hajjah district
- Hajjah City district
- Harad district
- Hayran district
- Khayran Al Muharraq district
- Ku'aydinah district
- Kuhlan Affar district
- Kuhlan Ash Sharaf district
- Kushar district
- Mabyan district
- Midi district
- Mustaba district
- Najrah district
- Qafl Shamer district
- Qarah district
- Sharas district
- Wadhrah district
- Washhah district

== Ibb Governorate ==
- Al Dhihar district
- Al Makhadir district
- Al Mashannah district
- Al Qafr district
- Al Udayn district
- An Nadirah district
- Ar Radmah district
- As Sabrah district
- As Saddah district
- As Sayyani district
- Ash Sha'ir district
- Ba'dan district
- Dhi As Sufal district
- Far Al Udayn district
- Hazm Al Udayn district
- Hubaysh district
- Ibb district
- Jiblah district
- Mudhaykhirah district
- Yarim district

== Lahij Governorate ==
- Al Hawtah district
- Al Had district
- Al Madaribah Wa Al Arah district
- Al Maflahy district
- Al Maqatirah district
- Al Milah district
- Al Musaymir district
- Al Qabbaytah district
- Habil Jabr district
- Halimayn district
- Radfan district
- Tuban district
- Tur Al Bahah district
- Yafa'a district
- Yahr district

== Ma'rib Governorate ==
- Al Abdiyah district
- Al Jubah district
- Bidbadah district
- Harib district
- Harib Al Qaramish district
- Jabal Murad district
- Mahliyah district
- Majzar district
- Marib district
- Marib City district
- Medghal district
- Raghwan district
- Rahabah district
- Sirwah district

== Raymah Governorate ==
- Al Jabin district
- Al Jafariyah district
- As Salafiyah district
- Bilad At Ta'am district
- Kusmah district
- Mazhar district

== Sa'dah Governorate ==
- Al Dhaher district
- Al Hashwah district
- As Safra district
- Baqim district
- Ghamr district
- Haydan district
- Kitaf wa Al Boqe'e district
- Majz district
- Monabbih district
- Qatabir district
- Razih district
- Sa'adah district
- Sahar district
- Saqayn district
- Shada'a district

== Sana'a Governorate ==
- Al Haymah Ad Dakhiliyah district
- Al Haymah Al Kharijiyah district
- Al Husn district
- Arhab district
- Attyal district
- Bani Dhabyan district
- Bani Hushaysh district
- Bani Matar district
- Bilad Ar Rus district
- Hamdan district
- Jihanah district
- Khwlan district
- Manakhah district
- Nihm district
- Sa'fan district
- Sanhan district

== Shabwah Governorate ==
- Ain district
- Al Talh district
- Ar Rawdah district
- Arma district
- As Said district
- Ataq district
- Bayhan district
- Dhar district
- Habban district
- Hatib district
- Jardan district
- Mayfa'a district
- Merkhah Al Ulya district
- Merkhah As Sufla district
- Nisab district
- Rudum district
- Usaylan district

== Socotra Governorate ==
- Hidaybu district (eastern part of Socotra Island)
- Qulensya wa Abd al Kuri district (western part of Socotra Island, Abd al Kuri Island, others)

== Ta'izz Governorate ==
- Al Makha district
- Al Ma'afer district
- Al Mawasit district
- Al Misrakh district
- Al Mudhaffar district
- Al Qahirah district
- Al Wazi'iyah district
- As Silw district
- Ash Shamayatayn district
- At Ta'iziyah district
- Dhubab district
- Dimnat Khadir district
- Hayfan district
- Jabal Habashy district
- Maqbanah district
- Mashra'a Wa Hadnan district
- Mawiyah district
- Mawza district
- Sabir Al Mawadim district
- Salh district
- Same'a district
- Shara'b Ar Rawnah district
- Shara'b As Salam district
