= Hajjah Governorate =

Governorate of Yemen

Coordinates: 15°42′N 43°36′E

Hajjah محافظة حجة
- Governorate
- Country: Yemen
- Region: Tihama Region
- Seat: Hajjah

Area
  - Total: 8,227 km^{2} (3,176 sq mi)

Population (2025 est.)
  - Total: 2,688,497
  - Density: 326.8/km^{2} (846.4/sq mi)

Hajjah (Arabic: حجة, romanized: Ḥaǧǧa) is a governorate of Yemen. It is located in the northwestern part of the country along the Red Sea coast and is approximately 123 km (76 mi) from the national capital Sana'a. It covers an area of approximately 8,227 km^{2} (3,176 sq mi) and is subdivided into 31 districts. Its administrative centre is Hajjah. According to the 2004 census, it had a population of 1,479,568, and an estimated population of 2,688,497 in 2025.

== Geography ==
Hajjah is one of the governorates of Yemen. It is located in the northwestern part of the country, along the Red Sea coast, approximately 123 km (76 mi) from the national capital Sana'a. It is bordered by Hodeidah Governorate to the west, Amran Governorate to the east, and Al Mahwit Governorate to the south. It shares a land border with Saudi Arabia to the north. It occupies an area of approximately 8,227 km^{2} (3,176 sq mi), and the city of Hajjah serves as the seat of the governorate.

The governorate experiences a varied climate with the mountainous areas experiencing mild summers and cold winters, while the lower areas adjoining the Tihamah plains experiencing hot summers and mild winters.

== Administration and sub-divisions ==
The governorate is administered by a local council consisting of 31 members and the governor. Al Mahwit Governorate is divided into 31 districts.

Districts
District	Size (km²)	Population (2025 est.)		
District	Size (km²)	Total	Male	Female
Abs	1,517	360,137	183,174	176,963
Aflah Al Yaman	84	70,018	35,614	34,404
Aflah Ash Shawm	67	83,401	42,419	40,982
Al Jamimah	343	67,638	34,403	33,235
Al Maghrabah	68	106,486	54,160	52,326
Al Mahabishah	41	90,078	45,816	44,262
Al Miftah	83	58,963	29,990	28,973
Ash Shaghadirah	518	84,429	42,943	41,486
Ash Shahil	196	54,472	27,704	26,768
Aslem	55	158,358	80,546	77,812
Bakil Al Mir	661	51,328	26,107	25,221
Bani Al Awam	87	90,373	45,966	44,407
Bani Qa'is	24	100,504	51,119	49,385
Hajjah	61	50,431	25,653	24,778
Hajjah City	61	118,482	60,261	58,221
Harad	1,058	12,441	6,328	6,113
Hayran	179	26,864	13,664	13,200
Khayran Al Muharraq	41	141,205	71,822	69,383
Ku'aydinah	105	129,019	65,623	63,396
Kuhlan Affar	286	69,043	35,117	33,926
Kuhlan Ash Sharaf	155	81,509	41,457	40,052
Kushar	250	105,591	53,707	51,884
Mabyan	76	89,718	45,632	44,086
Midi	667	29,870	15,193	14,677
Mustaba	285	90,225	45,891	44,334
Najrah	43	62,829	31,957	30,872
Qafl Shamer	254	90,319	45,938	44,381
Qarah	250	59,254	30,139	29,115
Sharas	130	29,328	14,917	14,411
Wadhrah	448	21,554	10,963	10,591
Washhah	250	104,630	53,218	51,412
Total	8,338	2,688,497	1,367,441	1,321,056

== Demographics ==
According to the 2004 population census, Hajjah Governorate had a population of 1,479,568. The population was estimated to be 1,782,000 in 2011. According to a 2025 report, the governorate had an estimated population of 2,688,497, of which 1,367,441 were males and 1,321,056 were females.

== Economy ==
Agriculture and animal husbandry are the principal economic activities in the governorate. Hajjah governorate contributes to approximately 4.6% of Yemen's total agricultural output. Major crops include cereals, vegetables, and fruits apart from other cash crops. A World Bank-supported agricultural development project identified Hajjah among five governorates selected for interventions in rain-fed agriculture and livestock production. Other activities include apiculture, handicrafts, and fishing in the coastal areas. The governorate has significant mineral deposits including cobalt, copper, feldspar, gold, nickel, and quartz. Other economic activities include tourism driven by the thermal springs and cultural sites in the region. As the governorate shares a land border with Saudi Arabia, there is a border crossing at Harad, which generates income through trade and customs.

In 2014, about 64% of the population was living in poverty with Hajjah having the second highest poverty levels in Yemen after Hodeidah. According to the 2014 local authority budget, locally generated revenues including taxes accounted for only 8% and grants and central government subsidies accounted for 92% of the budget.

== Yemeni civil war ==
The governorate was one of the worst affected due to the Yemeni civil war (2014–present), which has resulted in significant displacement of population and heavy damage to infrastructure. The Houthis captured Hajjah in September 2014, which gave them access to the Red Sea coast. Owing to its shared border with Saudi Arabia and to deny the Houthis access to the Maydi port, the Saudi-led coalition had attempted to regain control of the governorate since March 2015. The conflict and airstrikes have caused significant damage to the infrastructure in the governorate.

According to the United Nations Office for the Coordination of Humanitarian Affairs, ther were about 580,000 people who were internally displaced due to the war and were living in 300 camps across the governorate. It classified that about 60% of the population of the governorate required support and assistance due to the war.
