= Battle of Marib (2021–2022) =

Battle to capture last stronghold in North Yemen

- Part of the Marib campaign of the Yemeni Civil War (2014–present)
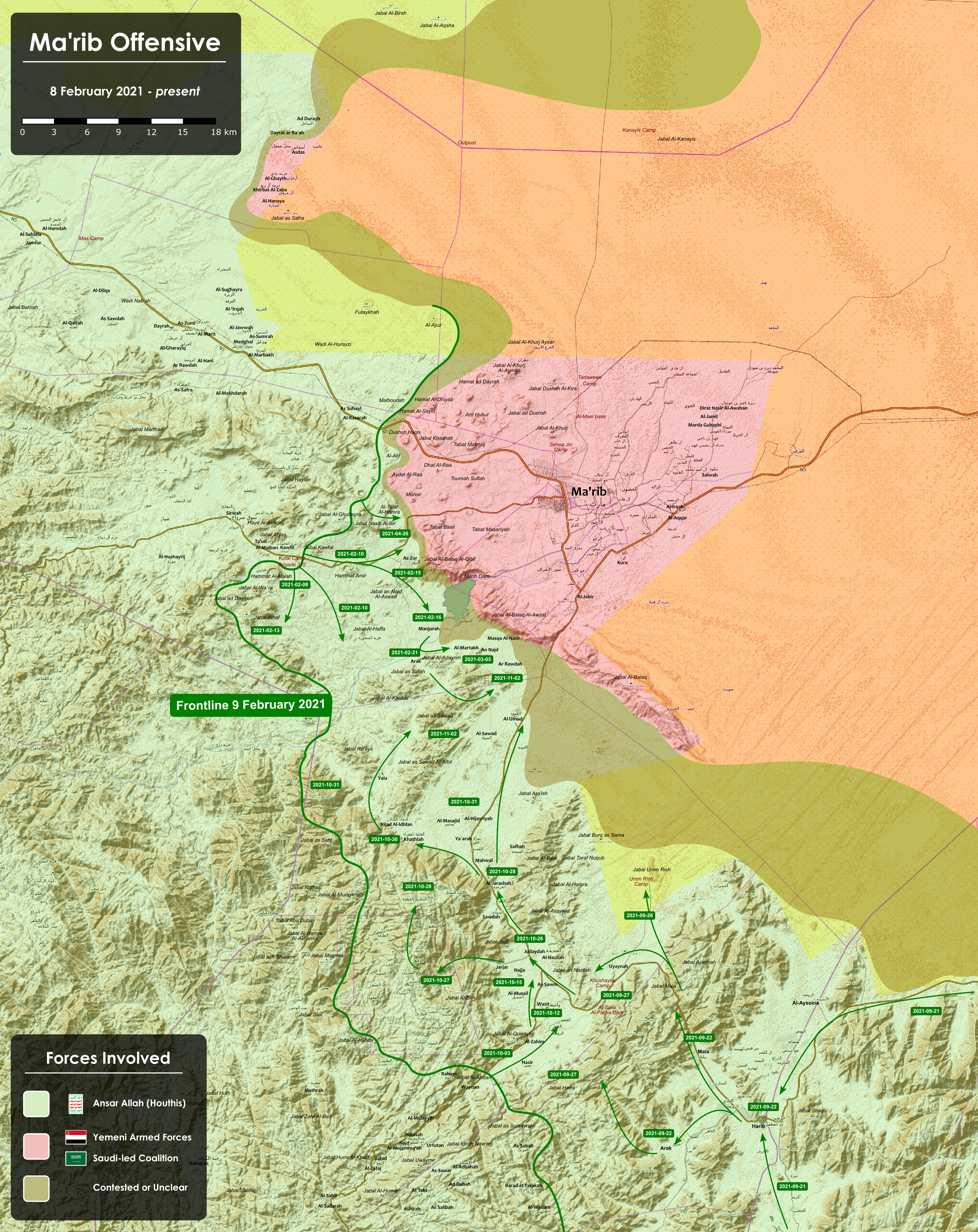
- Current territorial control of Marib city and its surroundings
| Date | 22 February 2021 – 1 April 2022 (1 year, 1 month, 1 week and 3 days) |
| Location | Marib, Marib Governorate, Yemen |
| Status | Ceasefire: Houthis reaches into the northern gates of Marib on March 8, 2022.; Houthis retake control of the Rahabah district on September 8.; Houthis take control of the Abdiya, Harib, Al Jubah, and Jabal Murad districts in Marib Governorate by late 2021.; Hadi government forces and allies recapture Harib in early 2022.; Nationwide ceasefire came into effect since April 2022. |

Belligerents
| (Yemen) Revolutionary Committee/Supreme Political Council: Houthi movement; Supported by: Iran: IRGC | Cabinet of Yemen: Security Forces; Islah party AQAP; Saudi Arabia According to Houthi media and officials: (Islamic State) ISIL-YP |

Commanders and leaders
| Maj. Gen. Abdul Latif Hamoud Al-Mahdi † (Commander Fourth Military Region); Cmdr. Qussai Al Ammari †; Abo Khaled Al-Sufyani †; Mohammed Al-Radhi Gharbi † | (Yemen) Gov. Sultan Ali al-Arada (Yemen) Maj. Gen Nasser al-Dhaibani † (MOD Operations Head) (Yemen) Maj. Gen Amin al-Waeli † (Chief of Sixth Military Region) (Yemen) Maj. Gen. Mohammad Mashli al-Harmali † (Chief of Seventh Military Region) (Yemen) Maj. Gen Abdullah Hadhari † (Director of the Military Judiciary Department) (Yemen) Brg. Gen. Nasir al-Barhati † (Commander 2nd Brigade) (Yemen) Abdul Ghani Mohammad Salman † (Yemen) Brg. Gen Saleh Ladhimd al-Obab † (Special Forces Leader) (Yemen) Brg. Gen. Yusef Mahdi al-Badaji † (Artillery Commander 107th Inf. Brg.) (Yemen) Brg. Gen. Abd al-Ghani Shaalan (Special Forces Commander) (Yemen) Col. Nofal al-Hawri † (Special Forces Leader) (Yemen) Brg. Gen. Musaad al-Sayadi † (Head 143rd Brg.) (Yemen) Brg. Gen. Salih Darham Alarmed † (Commander 129th Brg.) (Yemen) Brig. Gen. Mohammed Al-Jaradi † (Commander 81st Brg.) Abu Fawaz al-Ma'ribi; Salem Saleh Balqfal † (Al-Qaeda Leader) (Islamic State) Siyaf al-Sanaani † |

Units involved
| Pro-Houthi Armed Forces: Army; Fourth Military Region; Pro-Houthi Air Force; Houthi sleeper cells (suspected) | Anti-Houthi Armed Forces: Army; 143rd Infantry Brigade; 129th Infantry Brigade; 107th Infantry Brigade; 81st Infantry Brigade; Giants Brigades |

Casualties and losses
| ~14,700 killed (Houthi claim; June-Nov. 2021); 1 Mi-24 combat helicopter destroyed | 3,050+ killed (Hadi-Government/Coalition claim); 7,000+ wounded (per Hadi government); 2 CH-4 combat drones shot down 7 ScanEagle drones shot down |
- 100+ civilians killed. At least 55,000 civilians displaced from Marib since early 2021, according to United Nations.

The Battle of Marib was a battle that began in February 2021 following the advance of the Houthis towards the city of Marib, the capital of Marib Governorate in Yemen controlled by the Cabinet of Yemen. On April 1, a United Nations sponsored two-month nationwide truce took place until October 2022.

== Timeline ==
=== 2021 ===
==== February ====
On 22 February, the media center of the pro-Hadi Yemeni army claimed that 70 Houthis were killed and others were injured or captured in the western outskirts of Marib city. Hadi government military officials reported that "hundreds" had been killed since the start of the Houthi offensive, and that the majority of those killed were fighters rather than civilians. One military official described the situation in Marib as a "blood bath". Loyalist defenses in Sirwah collapsed, with the Houthis advancing to within 20 kilometers of Marib city.

On 23 February, Yemeni local sources close to the Houthis said that the city of Marib was being encircled from three directions. On the same day, pro-Hadi government and al-Isah sources reported that General Nasir al-Barhati was killed by an airstrike at al-Meel camp along with ten of his bodyguards. Four days later, it was reported that the commander of the special forces Lt. Gen Abd al-Ghani Shaalan was killed while fighting the Houthis in Serwah near Marib; an investigation was carried out by the Hadi Government Ministry of Defense regarding his death. On 27 February, it was reported that Colonel Nofal al-Hawri was also killed while fighting the Houthis.

==== March ====
On 2 March, Yemeni local sources close to the Houthis reported heavy fighting on the outskirts of northwest Marib city with Houthi forces advancing towards the area of Sahn al-Jan camp which overlooks Marib city.

On 3 March, the Houthi deputy foreign minister reported that the Houthis had taken control of 10 out of 14 districts in Marib. The foreign minister of the Hadi government said that the Houthis had launched more than 15 ballistic missiles towards Marib during the preceding week. Houthi forces were reportedly working to surround all districts of the city.

On 4 March, the pro-Hadi government Yemeni army restarted an offensive against Houthi fighters in Taiz, possibly to relieve pressure for pro-government forces in Marib as well as to divert Houthi manpower to other frontlines elsewhere in Yemen.

On 6 March, clashes between the Houthis and Hadi government forces left at least 90 combatants dead on both sides. Yemeni regional media close to the Houthis said that Saudi coalition aircraft targeted by error reinforcements of the Hadi government forces approaching Marib from Shabwah and Abyan, leaving 84 killed and 56 wounded. The friendly fire event was followed by a restriction made on media from reporting friendly fire events on Hadi government controlled areas. Hadi Government officials denied the claim adding that no "friendly fire" event took place.

By 8 March, the Houthi-led Yemeni Army breached the northern gates of Marib city after fierce battles between them and Saudi-led forces. In the following days up to 16 March, clashes continued in the northern and western outskirts of Marib between Houthi forces and the Saudi-led coalition east of Sirwah, Medghal, and Marib Dam.

On 21 March, Saudi media reported that the Royal Saudi Air Force managed to halt a Houthi infantry and tank offensive in Al-Ksarah with air strikes and inflicted losses on them.

On 22 March, Saudi Arabia offered the Houthi government a nationwide ceasefire plan. The Houthis rejected the offer, saying it did not address their desire of lifting the siege on the country.

On 23 March, Houthi forces shot down a Saudi Arabian CH-4 drone over Marib, displaying footage of the shot down.

On 27 March, Major General Amin Al-Waeli was reported killed northwest of Marib while fighting Houthi forces. Al-Waeli was the leader of the Sixth Military Region for the Hadi-led government forces.

On 31 March, Brigadier General Saleh Ladhimd al-Obab was reported killed near northwest Marib while fighting the Houthis. Some sources say he was ambushed among its bodyguards while others reported he was killed by a mortar attack. During the same day, Houthi forces were reported to have captured the areas of Hamat al-Hamra, Hamat al-Dhiyab, Dash al-Haqan and Idat al-Raa, thus inching closer towards Marib from the west.

==== April ====
On 1 April, the Saudi-led coalition said it destroyed a ballistic missile Houthis prepared to attack Marib city.

On 2 April, a Houthi commander named Qussai Al Ammari was reported killed in Al-Kasarah west of Marib during clashes with pro-Hadi Government forces.

On 3 April, Houthi forces clashed with Hadi Government forces near al-Kashab with reports of making advances within 9 kilometers from Marib city. However, regional media close to Hadi forces claimed they foiled the Houthis' attack with aerial support from the Saudi-led coalition.

On 6 April, an RSAF airstrike killed Houthi General Abdul Latif Hamoud Al-Mahdi who was the commander of the Houthi fourth military region. General Al-Mahdi was No. 29 on the Saudi-led coalition most wanted list with US$5 million in reward for in intelligence leading to his arrest or death. The same day regional media close to Houthis reported the death of three Hadi Government military leaders, including Brigadier General Yusef Mahdi al-Badaji of the 107th Infantry Brigade and two al Jawf militia leaders.

On 7 April, Maj. Gen. Mohammad Mashli al-Harmali, commander of the Seventh Military District of Hadi forces, was killed on the battlefield west of the city of Marib. He was killed in a Houthi missile attack on the positions of Saudi-led forces west of the city of Marib.

On 17 April, pro-Hadi media reported that Hadi government forces had recaptured the Alam Mountain Range between the areas of Al-Mashjah and Al-Kasarah west of Marib after 48 hours of fierce battles with heavy air support from the Saudi led coalition.

On 18 April, Yemeni regional media close to the Houthis claimed that the Al-Qaeda leader in Yemen, Salem Saleh Balqfal was killed while fighting in the north of Marib city, while leading an attack on Al-Mashjaha along other foreign fighters.

On 19 April, during fighting between pro-Hadi forces and Houthi forces, Abo Khaled Al-Sufyani, the Houthi commander of Al-Kasarah front was killed. Al-Sufyani was the third commander of Kassarah front to be killed since the beginning of the Battle of Marib. The same day, numerous tribal factions in Marib Governorate attacked pro-Hadi forces in an attempt to free people imprisoned by them. This resulted in multiple casualties on both sides as well as bombardment of the tribal factions by the coalition.

On 20 April, Yemeni regional media close to Hadi loyalists claimed that a Hezbollah advisor named Abdullah Aun Tbekh was killed while fighting with Hadi forces west of Marib.

On 22 April, Houthi commander Mohammed Al-Radhi Gharbi was killed during clashes between Houthi and government forces.

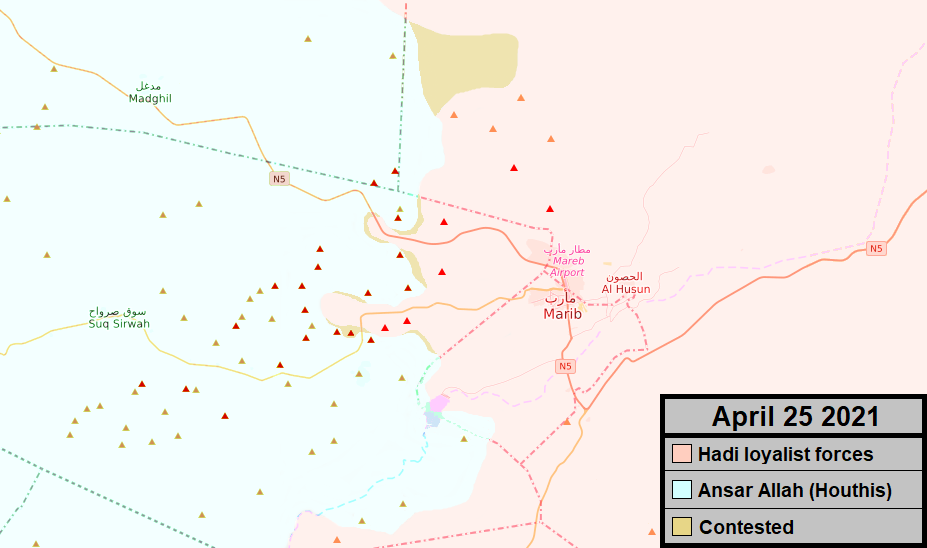
Military situation in Marib and the outskirts, 25 April 2021

On 23 April, Yemeni regional media close to Hadi loyalists said Hadi government forces captured parts of Rahbah district with help from tribesmen and air support from the Saudi-led coalition.

On 24 April, Hadi government officials reported that a total of 2,000 Houthi fighters and leaders had been killed since the beginning of the offensive two months ago as well as 1,800 Hadi government soldiers, military commanders and allied tribal fighters.

On 25 April, military officials told AFP that Houthi forces had captured the northwest Kassara battlefront amid clashes that left 65 dead on both sides during the previous two days, with Houthi forces coming within six kilometers of Marib's city center. A Hadi government commander, Major General Abdullah al-Hadhari was reported killed by Yemeni regional media while fighting in Marib. However, the Hadi government's information minister, Moammar AL-Eryani, denied the news that Houthis had taken control of Kassara and expressed his "deep regret that a global agency has been subject to misinformation and has promoted unfounded news".

On 27 April, Hadi government officials reported that they managed to thwart a 'massive' Houthi attack on Marib. However, they said that the Houthis had advanced in four areas of the Mashjah front.

On 28 April, Hadi government officials said that their forces recaptured positions that were previously taken by Houthis days before, in Al-Mashjah in the district of Sirwah.

On 29 April, a senior officer in Hadi government forces was killed in clashes with Houthi rebels, the Yemeni Defense Ministry and General Staff said in a statement that Brigadier General Abdul Ghani Mohammad Salman died.

==== May ====
On 1 May, clashes in Wadi Nakhla and Talaat al-Hamra resulted in the death of Gen. Salih Darham al-Ramadi, commander of the Hadi government forces 129th Brigade.

On 5 May, the prime minister of the internationally recognized government Maeen Abdulmalik Saeed visited the city of Marib as the Houthis' offensive to capture the governorate appeared to be faltering.

On 25 May, Saudi and Yemeni media close to Hadi government reported the killing of Hezbollah expert named Mustafa Al-Gharawi north west of Marib in an airstrike by Saudi-led coalition. The Information Minister in the UN-recognized government of Yemen Muammar Al-Eryni said Al-Gharawi's death on the Marib front line showed the "magnitude of Iran's involvement in the Yemeni war".

==== June ====
On 5 June, 17 people are killed and 5 more are wounded during a rocket attack near a petrol station in Marib city. The Government blames the Houthis, who in turn, claim they only attacked a military camp and would welcome an independent investigation to the attack.

On 21 June, Houthi forces announced the shot down of two ScanEagle drones in Marib, displaying the shot down film of one of them, and the wreckage of both.

On 29 June, two missiles fired by the Houthis on Marib killed 3 people, including a child, and wounded at least 10 people.

==== July ====
On 14 July, pro-government forces with air support from the Royal Saudi Air Force, captured Rahabah District and some parts of Jabal Murad District. Source close to Hadi forces told Al Jazera that some Houthi fighters had surrendered to the government forces.

==== August ====
On 14 August, Houthi fighters shot down a Scan Eagle drone in Marib, displaying the wreckage of the drone.

==== September ====
On 2 September, Major General Nasser al-Thibani, a Saudi-led coalition commander, head of the War Operations in Marib, was reported dead by wounds.

On 3 September, Mohammad Hussein Al Houthi, one of the Houthis commanders and member to Al Houthi family was killed is air strike in Marib.

On 8 September, Houthis recaptured the Rahabah district, after heavy fighting.

On 25 September, media close to Houthis said fighting was taking place in Marib Abdiyah district with Hadi-led forces of the 159th Brigade being surrounded by Houthis fighters, inside the Bani Abd area of the same district.

On 27 September, Houthi Air Defenses shot down a ScanEagle drone in Jubah district, Southern Marib, later displaying footage of the wreckage.

==== October ====
On 4 October, Reuters reported that two children were killed and 33 other civilians injured in Houthi missile strikes on Yemen's central Marib city.

On 6 October, Houthi forces shot down another CH-4 drone operated by Saudi Arabia in Jubah district, Marib.

On 13 October, Houthi forces captured Waset, the former center of the strategic district of Jubah in Marib along with the villages of al-Qahir, al-Rawda, al-Khuweir. The Hadi-led government warned of an imminent "humanitarian catastrophe".

On 17 October, Houthi forces captured Abdiya and Harib districts in Marib and the Usaylan, Bayhan, and Ain districts of Shabwah Governorate.

On 20 October, fighting was still reported in Marib south, within the outskirts of Juba and Harib. During the battles Hadi government officials reported the death of 4 senior officers including General Musaad al-Sayadi, head of the 143rd Infantry Brigade, along with Brig. Gen. Abdul Raqeeb al-Naqash, Col. Ali al-Hajri and Major Waseem Shadiwa.

On 26 October, Houthi forces captured the center of Al-Jubah district as well as the al-Kutf mountain, according to tribal sources. This capture effectively cut off all internet communication to Marib. The following day media close to Houthis reported the capture of Jabal Murad, with others reports of the Hadi government forces evacuating the district.

On 31 October, media close to Houthis reported advances north of Al-Jubah, with Houthi forces approaching Marib city from the south at 28 km.

==== November ====
On 1 November, Reuters reported that a Houthi ballistic missile attack on a mosque and a religious school killed and injured 29 civilians, including women and children. There was no immediate claim of responsibility by the Iranian-backed Houthis.

On 2 November, Marib political parties condemned the Hadi led government and the Saudi-led Coalition for the failure in the way the defense of Marib was being handled. Failure at the political, military and economic levels were highlighted in a media statement after an emergency meeting being held the day before.

On 9 November, Houthi media reported the interception and shot down of a US-made ScanEagle drone in al-Jubah district, Marib. Later displaying footage of the drone wreckage a day after.

On 10 November, Houthi media said its forces launched seven ballistic missiles, three in the Saudi region of Asir targeting KSA 1st Regiment base in the Dhahran, two on a base defended by Tariq Saleh forces in Mocha, and three on Marib. They also launched two on Balaq al-Awsat mountains and another at a military base in Marib. The attack coincided with the visit of UN envoy to Yemen to the port city of Mocha.

On 18 November, Agence France-Presse reported that nearly 14,700 Houthi rebels had been killed in the fighting near Marib since mid-June, according to two Houthi officials.

On 20 November, clashes took place in Sarwah front Marib, the clashes left Commander Salah al-Maliky of the "117th Brigade" killed, while Houthi forces attempted to attack Marib from the western side.

==== December ====
On December 3, Houthi forces shot down a US-built ScanEagle in Marib. Later publishing a video of the wreckage of the drone.

On December 8, after weeks of combat, media close to Houthi said that Houthi forces took control of the eastern half of the Al-Balaq Al-Sharqi mountain range. In addition, with the help of IRGC advisors, Houthi forces were able to operate a Mi-8/Mi-17 military helicopter on the Marib frontlines.

On December 9, Hadi Government forces reported the killing of a Hezbollah military advisor in Marib when Yemeni army troops shelled Houthi positions south of the city.

On December 13, Maj. Gen. Nasser al-Dhaibani, who headed military operations of the Hadi Government's Armed Forces, was killed on the front line in the Balaq mountain range, south of the city of Marib.

On December 28, Houthis launched several attacks to try to capture Marib city. A military leader of the Hadi Government Army forces said that they were attempting to cut off Houthi supply lines around Marib.

=== 2022 ===
==== January ====
On January 13, Saudi-led coalition said they destroyed a helicopter belonging to the Houthis, in Marib Governorate. The helicopter was a Mi-24/35 attack helicopter that was reported operating by Houthi forces in Marib.

On January 26, after capturing neighboring districts in Shabwah Gavernorate the government forces and the Giants Brigades attacked and captured the district of Harib and its center south of Marib city after nearly two weeks of fighting, pushing their way to the nearby district of Juba.

On January 29, Houthi forces said they shot down a US-made ScanEagle from the Saudi Coalition in Marib. Later media close to the Houthis displayed footage of the drone wreck.

==== March ====
On 30 March, officials from the Kingdom of Saudi Arabia reported that a ceasefire was agreed and peace talks were being arranged with the Houthis across Yemen.

==== April ====
On 1 April, the United Nations envoy for Yemen, Hans Grundberg announced a two month ceasefire beginning on 2 April.

On 18 April, the ceasefire between the Houthi rebels and the Hadi government was being held for two months with some movement of troops by Houthis forces and some attacks taking place in Marib.

A Nationwide ceasefire between Houthis and Saudi led coalition took place and continued until early 2023.

==== November ====
In early November, unidentified gunmen killed Brig. Gen. Mohammed Al-Jaradi, advisor to Yemen's defense minister, just outside Marib. Meanwhile, the Houthis continued to launch drone and rocket attacks on the city.

== Significance ==
Marib is viewed by observers as the final remaining stronghold of Hadi government forces in northern Yemen. Marib also currently hosts hundreds of thousands of displaced civilians from the conflict. Marib is also the site of a coveted oil refinery, while Yemeni Government and Saudi officials warned that should Marib be captured by the Houthis, it could serve as a launch pad for continued strikes on Saudi Arabia's oil infrastructure and other targets.

The Associated Press reported on the battle's implications for regional politics in the context of the Persian Gulf crisis and the Iran–Saudi Arabia proxy conflict. Experts cited by AP viewed the Houthis' attack on the city as a sign of possible Iranian frustration with the United States government–the Houthis have alleged ties to the Iranian government–and its failure to swiftly lift sanctions as the Biden administration sought to re-enter Iran's nuclear deal. The Saudi government argued that the U.S.'s prior removal of the Houthis from its foreign terrorist organization list had emboldened the group.

== See also ==
- Marib campaign
