= Marib petrol station attack =

Marib patrol station attack
- Part of Battle of Marib in the Marib campaign of the Yemeni civil war (2014-present)
- Location: Rawdha neighborhood, Marib, Marib Governorate, Yemen
- Date: June 5, 2021
- Deaths: 21
- Perpetrators: Houthis (per Yemeni govt, denied by Houthis)

On June 5, 2021, a gas station in Marib, Yemen was hit by an airstrike allegedly perpetrated by the Houthis, killing at least 21 civilians. The airstrike occurred during the battle of Marib that began in February 2021, with Houthi forces attempting to seize the last Yemeni government-controlled city in northern Yemen.

== Background ==
The Houthi movement emerged in the 1990s as a radical Shiite religious militant group waging war against the Yemeni government. In 2014, the movement declared war against the Yemeni government led by Abdrabbuh Mansur Hadi. The Saudi government, backed by American arms shipments, declared war on the Houthis a year later. In February 2021, the Houthis launched an offensive to capture Marib, the last government-held city in northern Yemen.

== Attack ==
The airstrike took place at a gas station near the Shabwani market in the Rawdha neighborhood on the outskirts of Marib, which was under government control although not near any security checkpoints. At the time of the attack, dozens of cars were at the station waiting to fuel up. Local media reported that a missile and a booby-trapped drone carried out the attack. The owner of the gas station said that one of his workers was killed in the attack, and that the explosion could be felt across the city. Two of the people killed were a father and his daughter, both refugees from 'Amran governorate.

The Yemeni government information minister Moammar al-Eryani stated that all of those killed and injured in the airstrike were civilians. The Yemeni government also accused the Houthis of the attack, and said it was part of a wider campaign against civilians in Marib. The Houthis denied that civilians were involved, and stated that the airstrike had instead hit a military camp. They also stated that they would welcome an independent investigation into the airstrike.

A medical source told Reuters that the injured were taken to a hospital, and twelve people including five children had died of injuries. A spokesman for the Marib Governorate stated that at least fourteen people were killed and five were injured in the attack. al-Eryani, a Saudi state television, and Yemeni Health Minister Qasem Buhaibeh all stated the death toll was at least seventeen. The death toll later rose to 21 civilians on June 7.
