= Hirab (disambiguation) =

'Hirab or Hiraab may refer to:

- Hiraab, a Somali clan
- The Hiraab Imamate and surrounding areas in Somalia
- Hirab, a village in Lorestan, western Iran

== See also ==
- Harab
- Harib (disambiguation)
- Hira (disambiguation)
- Horeb (disambiguation)
- Hurab
