= Marib campaign =

Campaign of the Yemeni Civil War

- Part of the Yemeni Civil War (2014–present)
- Marib Governorate
Date	22 March 2015 – 1 April 2022 (7 years, 1 week and 3 days)
Location	Marib Governorate, Yemen
Result	Ceasefire: Houthis forces take control of Sirwah; Government forces recapture Marib by late 2016; Houthi forces re-launch an offensive on Marib Governorate with the aim of capturing the city of Marib in February 2021; Nationwide cease fire taking place since April 2022.

Belligerents
(Yemen) Revolutionary Committee/Supreme Political Council: Houthi fighters; Security Forces (pro-Saleh) (2015 – 2017); Yemeni Republican Guard (2015 – 2017)	(Yemen) Yemeni government: Security Forces (pro-Hadi); People's Committees; Popular resistance; Islah party; Al-Qaeda; According to Houthi media & officials: (Islamic State) ISIL-YP; Supported by: Arab Coalition: Saudi Arabia (leader); Bahrain; Egypt; Jordan; Kuwait; Morocco; Sudan; United Arab Emirates

Commanders and leaders
Hussain al-Mutawakel (POW); Abu Jabar Ahmad al-Houthi (POW)	(Yemen) Maj. Gen Abdul-Rab al-Shadadi † (Third Military Region Marib) (Yemen) Brg. Gen Sultan Ali al-Arada (Yemen) Maj. Gen Amin al-Waeli † (Sixth Military Region) (Yemen) Gen Nasir al-Barhati † (Yemen) Gen Sagheer Hamoud Aziz (Chief of Staff) (Yemen) Lt. Gen Abd al-Ghani Shaalan † (Special Forces Commander) (Yemen) Brg. General Abdullah Ahmad Al-Abd † (81th Infantry Brigade) (Yemen) Col. Ali Omar Murad † (Commander 2nd Battalion) (Yemen) Lt. Col. Saleh Abdo Hashem al-Jamali † (Yemen) Col. Arafat Yahya Muflih al-Sabri † (Chief Marib Military Zone) (Yemen) Sheikh Yasser al-Oadhi (Yemen) Rabish Bin Ali Wahban † (Yemen) Sheikh Saleh al-Obeidi † (Saudi Arabia) Cmdr.Salim al-Massaabi † (Chief of Staff 173rd Infantry Brigade) (Saudi Arabia) Salem Mosaed Hadi Al-Arifi † (Leader 173rd Infantry Brigade) (Saudi Arabia) Brg Gen. Khaled Al-Aqra (Saudi Arabia) Lt. Col Fahad Abdul Rahman Rakan †

Units involved
Popular Committees; Armed Tribesmen of Murad (Since September 2020)	Islah party militias Armed Tribesmen of Baydha; Armed Tribesmen of Murad

Casualties and losses
Unknown	Unknown

The Marib campaign, also called Marib offensive (Arabic: جبهة مأرب), was a military campaign in the Yemeni civil war for the control of the Marib Governorate of Yemen. Fighting between the Houthi forces and factions of the Yemeni Army loyal to the Supreme Political Council on one side, and Yemeni Army units loyal to President Abdrabbuh Mansur Hadi and militiamen on the other side, has taken place since early 2015. Marib is rich in oil and gas resources and is a key strategic governorate because it connects the Houthi-controlled Sanaa and Alimi-controlled Hadhramaut governorates. On April 1, a United Nations sponsored two-month nationwide truce took place until October 2022, however the truce continued in practice.

== Timeline ==
=== 2015 ===
In September 2015, Saudi-backed Yemeni forces loyal to the government of President Hadi engaged Houthi forces and successfully established control over the eastern and western regions of Marib province. They took territory in Sirwah and Hareeb district, including the Hailan mountain, Al Ateef, Al Makhdarah, and Al Masaryah hill.

On 4 September, Houthi forcers launched a OTR-21 Tochka ballistic missile at a Saudi-led coalition base in Safer, killing at least 52 Emirati, 10 Saudis and 5 Bahrainis servicemen.

=== 2016 ===
The 2015 missile strike marked an escalation in the conflict. In the months that followed, coalition air strikes targeted more civilian sites than military targets. During the 18-month period, between 26 March 2015 and 2 August 2016 there were nearly 500 attacks in Mar'ib, which was located at the frontline of the battle between coalition and Houthi forces. In 2016 the Yemen Data Project reported that Saudi air raids had hit a market in Sirwah twenty-four times.

In October, Houthi forces killed Major General Abdul-Rab al-Shadadi, a high-level pro-government commander. Houthis leaders Hussain al-Mutawakel and Abu Jabar Ahmad al-Houthi, were captured by coalition forces. Coalition forces fought with Houthis for control over the route that runs from Yemen's capital Sanaa through Sirwah to Mar'ib.

=== 2017 ===
In November 2017, The New York Times reported that Mar'ib was "an island of relative calm".

=== 2020 ===
On 18 January, a missile attack on a military training camp in the central province of Marib killed at least 111 soldiers, while dozens were wounded. Yemeni government blamed Houthi rebels for the attack, as there was no claim of responsibility. The strike targeted a mosque as people met for prayer, military sources told Reuters.

On 8 April, Saudi-led coalition spokesman Turki Al-Maliki announced a two-week ceasefire, partly in view of the COVID-19 pandemic. Saudi Vice Defence Minister Prince Khalid bin Salman tweeted that Saudi Arabia would contribute $500 million to the UN humanitarian response plan for Yemen in 2020 and another $25 million to help combat the spread of the coronavirus.

On 27 May, Houthi fighters launched two ballistic missiles on the Saudi backed forces of the Hadi government in Marib province. One missile targeted an army headquarters and another a military camp. The attack left 7 officers dead, including the Chief of Staff, Lieutenant General Sagheer bin Aziz's son and nephew, both officers. Bin Aziz survived the attack.

On 30 May, regional media reported the departure of American and Saudi servicemen from Marib province. One of the alleged reasons was to avoid Houthi attacks and missile strikes.

On 3 June, an explosive device killed 9 Hadi Government soldiers and high-ranking officers, including the 81st Infantry Brigade Chief of Operations, Brigadier General Abdullah Ahmad Al Abdi and the Commander of the 2nd Battalion, Colonel Ali Omar Murad. Another Colonel was killed by another IED after going to the region to investigate. In the last weeks a total of 13 officers were killed in IED style of ambushes near the Seventh Military Region in Marib.

On 21 June, Houthi-led forces fought its way in the Al Bayda Governorate, with the aim of reaching Mahilia area and attacking Marib by the South. According to pro-Hadi government media the Houthi offensive on Al-Nahma area, Mahliyah District of Marib, left tribesmen loyal to the government and soldiers in a dire situation of being attacked from the South.

On 24 June, media sources close to the Houthis reported the deaths of prominent commanders on Hadi Government forces including Lt. Col. Saleh Abdo Hashem al-Jamali, two Captains; Ibrahim al Akki and Adam Jarban, the Chief from the 4th Battalion, 141st Brigade. Several other soldiers were reported killed amid news of hospitals in Shabwa and Marib collapsing from battle casualties.

On 30 June, Houthi forces made further advances on the north of Badya and the south of Marib, seizing 400 km^{2} (150 sq mi) of terrain and inflicting 250 killed, wounded and captured Pro-Hadi Government forces.

On 12 August, Houthi sources reported advances on the Marib front against ISIS and Al-Qaeda forces located in the southeast of Marib and Saudi-led forces in the southwest.

On 1 September, Houthi media reported military advances made by the Houthi rebels on the district of Mahiliya in Marib Province. Advances were reported also on Al-Aqabah, Al-Mohalil Market, the Murad Mountain and villages of Ghubayb and Asha. Hadi Government officials denied the reports.

On 7 September, Houthi forces made further advances in Marib Governorate closing in on Marib city itself, Mohamed al-Bokhaiti a member of the Houthi movement informed on social media.

By late September, the campaign had become a war of attrition with more fighting being reported and Houthi forces advancing on Marib from three directions.

On 8 October, media close to the Houthis announced that a large force of the Hadi government forces was defeated in the North of Marib and the area of Al-Khanjar camp in al Jawf governorate, at least 3 Colonels and many field commanders and soldiers were reported killed.

On 13 November, Houthi forces announced the capture of Camp Mas after three previous unsuccessful attacks. The capture could allow the Houthis to take over the Raghwan and Midghal districts.

On 22 December, Houthi rebels shot down a Saudi Arabian CH-4B drone in the Medghal District in Marib Province. Houthi forces intensified their attacks along the northern front of Al Jawf and Marib, despite the daily deaths reported by the COVID-19 pandemic.

=== 2021 ===
On 7 February, after reinforcing again, the Houthis renewed their offensive against Marib; a pro-Hadi government source told Middle East Eye. Houthi fighters launched a missile attack on a Hadi Government military camp in Marib killing 3 soldiers and wounding 4.

On 8 February, Houthi rebels launched a new offensive on Marib's with clashes taking place 10 kilometers west of the city, leaving 20 government soldiers killed and 29 injured as well as 7 Houthi fighters captured and others wounded according to a Hadi Government official.

On 12 February, Houthis shot down a Saudi Arabian CH-4 drone with a OSA surface to air missile and provided footage of the shootdown of the drone.

On 13 February, Sheikh Saleh al-Obeidi, leader of the Muslim Brotherhood Party in Yemen was killed alongside two Hadi-Government Colonels during Marib clashes.

On 15 February, Mark Lowcock the Humanitarian Chief of the United Nations expressed his concern regarding the Houthis advance on Marib city and called for a "de-escalatation". Military officials of the Hadi Government informed that Houthi rebels advanced towards the city in two fronts, after seizing al-Zor and advancing on the western sides of Marib Dam.

By 16 February, Houthi forces made large advances towards Marib, capturing the al-Zour and al-Hamajira villages and the Himar mountain area, placing them about 11 kilometers from the city. Government forces called for an immediate meeting and public mobilization to stop the rebel offensive.

On 18 February, media close to Houthis reported that Houthi forces took control of the Marib Dam, al-Balaq, Dahwan, and Athaf mountains, and the Kholan area, among others, as coalition forces staged a general retreat. This marked the first time since 2015 that the Houthis controlled Marib Dam, which now gave the Houthis fire control of the southern road to Marib. The Houthis and Al-Qaeda in Yemen said that al-Qaeda and ISIS militants were fighting alongside the government in the Tala’at al-Hamra area and east of Hilan. The Houthis later retreated from Marib dam and the south after resistance from Hadi Government forces. Fierce clashes were reported on the mountains south of the dam.

On 22 February, Houthi forces clashes with Hadi government forces were reported taking place at 20 km from Marib city.

The fighting ended following a United nations sponsored truce since April 1, 2022.

== Analysis ==
Marib is of particular strategic importance in the conflict because it is a center for oil & gas production in Yemen; the powerplants of Marib supply power to a significant part of the country and a gas pipeline passes south through Marib to the Gulf of Aden and the Red Sea. The Safer Exploration and Production Operations Company and other foreign companies who work in the energy sector are based in Mar'ib.

According to Nadwa Dawsari, an expert of Yemen topics cited by The New Arab, the 2020 Houthi offensive in Yemen was the largest offensive launched by the Houthis since 2015 after the Aden offensive. She also considered that if the Houthis managed to capture Marib they would consolidate their advances on the North and could continue launching attacks towards Shabwah or Hadhramaut.
