= Al-Jawf offensive =

Houthi offensive in February 2020

Al Jawf offensive
- Part of the Yemeni Civil War (2014–present), Saudi Arabian-led intervention in Yemen, and the Ma'rib Campaign
- Map of the offensive Pro-Houthi Government control Pro-Hadi Government control
Date	First Phase; 29 February – 29 April 2020 (2 months); Second Phase; 27 May 2020 – 5 February 2021 (8 months, 1 week and 2 days)
Location	Al Jawf Governorate, Ma'rib Governorate, Yemen
Result	Houthi victory
Territorial changes	Houthi fighters captured Al Hazm, the capital of Al Jawf Governorate, from Hadi Government.; Houthi forces captured 11 of the 12 districts and 95% of the Al-Jawf province.; Houthi forces captured five Saudi-led coalition military bases in Al-Jawf province and Marib province, including Mas military Camp.; Houthis controlled all of North Yemen except for Ma'rib Governorate

Belligerents
(Yemen) Supreme Political Council: Houthi movement	Cabinet of Yemen: Security Forces (pro-Hadi); Saudi Arabia

Commanders and leaders
Mohamed al-Atifi (Minister of Defense); Gen. Ezi Salah Motlaq Dihowa † (Chief of Staff 6th military Region); Gen. Roohallah Zaid Ali Moslih †	(Yemen) Lt. Gen. Sagheer bin Aziz (Chief of Staff) (Yemen) Sheikh Amin al-Okaimi (WIA) (Governor of Al-Jawf) (Yemen) Ali Mohsen Al Hoda (WIA) (Commander) (Yemen) Gen. Hameed al-Maswari † (Chief-of-operations in Kofal military camp) (Yemen) Gen. Mohamed Kamil al-Thaifani † (72nd Brgd. Commander) (Saudi Arabia) Khalid al-Joma'ei † (310th Brgd. Commander) (Saudi Arabia) Mohammed Ali-Roqn † (122nd Brigade) (Saudi Arabia) Abdul Nasser al-Halisi † (Commander)

Units involved
Houthi fighters Popular Committees	Islah militias Saudi Armed Forces

Strength
unknown	6 Brigades; 3 Battalions

Casualties and losses
unknown	1,200 casualties (Acc. to Houthis)

The Al Jawf offensive was a Houthi offensive that began in February 2020 with clashes in the Al Jawf Governorate during the Second Yemeni Civil War. Houthi forces were able to decisively capture the town of Al Hazm on 1 March 2020 from the Hadi government. On 27 April, the first phase of the offensive ended with the Houthis capturing 3,500 square kilometers of territory in Al Jawf Governorate. After reinforcing, the Houthis launched the second phase of their offensive on 27 May, making further advances toward the city of Marib and capturing the Maas military base on 20 November 2020. The Houthis halted the offensive on 5 February 2021, in order to account for changes in the Saudi-led coalition and Southern Transitional Council. After reinforcing once more, the Houthis launched a new offensive towards Marib city on 7 February.

== First phase ==
Al Jawf Governorate in red, Yemen

After weeks of clashes, Houthi fighters stormed the city of Al Hazm, the capital of Al Jawf province, from different directions on 1 March 2020. A Hadi Government official told Xinhua News Agency that the Hadi forces had failed to repulse the Houthi fighters storming Al Hazm from the western and northwestern sides. The Houthi forces were deployed in different parts of the city whilst all pro-Hadi government military withdrew to Ma'rib city. The fighting left dozens of soldiers killed.

The Houthi movement spokesperson said that the group controlled most of the Al Jawf District with the exception of some areas close to Saudi Arabia; the areas captured by the group comprised the Khub wal Shaaf and Yatma districts. The Houthi forces then turned the offensive on the Ma'rib Governorate with the aim of attacking Ma'rib city.

On 18 March, local sources reported that the Houthi forces had expelled the Saudi-backed forces from the Atias mountain, a base at the Kufil mountain, and the Ghabira mountain, with reported clashes taking place near Talaat al-Hamra.

On 28 March, according to the Houthi media wing, Houthi fighters seized the Kofal Camp. Two days later, local sources informed that Houthi fighters captured the military base of Labnah in Labnah mountains from Saudi led coalition forces. the capture of the military base allowed the Houthi forces to arm their aligned Popular Committees, the aim of the offensive was to encircle the al-Islah stronghold in oil-rich Ma'rib Province. Ongoing battles were reported in the Kofal Camp.

On 4 April, Yemeni government forces issued a statement saying that government forces supported by Saudi-led coalition airstrikes launched an attack on the Houthi militants in the Sirwah District, Ma'rib Governorate. According to Hadi Government forces, the fighting claimed 25 Houthi militants killed and several vehicles were destroyed. On the same day, pro-Houthi media reported that the clashes resulted in the death of a senior commander and several soldiers of the government forces. According to Houthi media 80 Pro Hadi government forces were killed and wounded. The 310th Brigade Commander Gen Mohamed Kamil al-Thaifani; the Chief of operations Gen Hameed al-Maswari and the 72nd Brigade's commander Gen Khalid al-Joma'ei were confirmed dead in the fighting.

On 8 April, Saudi-led coalition spokesman Turki Al-Maliki announced a two-week ceasefire, in part to avoid repercussions from the COVID-19 pandemic. Saudi vice defence minister Prince Khalid bin Salman tweeted that Saudi Arabia would contribute $500 million to the U.N. humanitarian response plan for Yemen in 2020 and another $25 million to help combat the spread of the coronavirus.

On 10 April, Houthis announced the capture of the military base of Khanjar from Saudi led coalition Forces after several attacks.

On 21 April, Houthi fighters captured the al-Jufra base from Saudi led coalition forces. Later Houthi forces concentrated their forces attacking the Mass military base and Wadi Mass. The same day Houthi media displayed a 15 min video of the capture of an AQAP base in the Khasaf region in Al-Jawf. The footage showed a prison, explosive belts, ammunition and Al-Qaeda operational documents.

By 28 April, Houthi forces said that they managed to capture eleven of the twelve districts and 95% of the Al-Jawf province with only the eastern district of Khab and al-Shaaf still being in Saudi-led coalition control. They controlled all of North Yemen except for Marib Governorate.

== Second phase ==
On 27 May, Houthi fighters launched two ballistic missiles on the Saudi backed forces of the Hadi government in Marib province. One missile targeted an army headquarters and another a military camp. The attack left 7 officers dead, including the Chief of Staff, Lieutenant General Sagheer bin Aziz's son and nephew, both officers. Bin Aziz survived the attack.

On 30 May, regional media reported the departure of American and Saudi servicemen from Marib province. One of the alleged reasons was to avoid Houthi attacks and missile strikes.

On 3 June, an explosive device killed 9 Hadi Government soldiers and high-ranking officers, including the 81st Infantry Brigade Chief of Operations, Brigadier General Abdullah Ahmad Al Abdi and the Commander of the 2nd Battalion, Colonel Ali Omar Murad. Another Colonel was killed by another IED after going to the region to investigate. In the last weeks a total of 13 officers were killed in IED style of ambushes near the Seventh Military Region in Marib.

On 24 June 2020, media sources close to the Houthis reported the deaths of prominent commanders on Hadi Government forces including Lt. Col. Saleh Abdo Hashem al-Jamali, two Captains; Ibrahim al Akki and Adam Jarban, the Chief from the 4th Battalion, 141st Brigade. Several other soldiers were reported killed amid news of hospitals in Shabwa and Marib collapsing from battle casualties.

On 17 August 2020, forces loyal to al-Hadi launched an ill-fated counter offensive to recapture Al Jawf. The attack left 8 servicemen killed, including General Mohammed Ali-Roqn of the Army 122nd Brigade.

On 22 August 2020, Houthi affiliated media said Houthi forces captured the Mas military camp in Northwest Marib, after defeating Hadi government forces and Islah party militias. The Mas military camp was twice unsuccessfully attacked by Houthi fighters on 4 April and 16 July, it is reportedly the main military base of Saudi Arabia-led forces in west Marib and overlooks the Saana Marib highway.

On 7 September 2020, Houthi forces made further advances on Marib Province closing into the city itself, Mohamed al-Bokhaiti a member of the Houthi movement informed in social media.

On 13 September 2020, pro-Hadi forces said that it had taken a Houthi command center in the northern province of Al-Jawf.

On 10 October 2020, pro-Hadi forces said they recaptured the strategic Al-Khanjar military camp.

On 20 November 2020, Houthi forces captured the Mas military camp after three previous unsuccessful attacks. The capture could allow the Houthis to take over the Raghwan and Midghal districts.

On 5 February 2021, the Houthis reportedly halted their offensive on Marib and al-Jawf in order to account for changes in the Saudi-led coalition and Southern separatists.

On 7 February 2021, the Houthis renewed their offensive from al-Jawf to Marib governorate.

== Aftermath ==
On 24 March 2021, Houthi-led forces captured swathes of desert areas in al-Jawf bordering Saudi Arabia. Regional source reported by December 2021 Houthi forces controlled all areas between Al-Jawf province and the Saudi border, including Hadi Government held Khub Washa’af district.

== Analysis ==
The capture of Al Hazm was considered by the head of the Sanaa Centre think tank as a "game-changer" for the Houthis, and could totally change the "course of the war". The United Nations Ambassador to Yemen Martin Griffiths labeled the offensive as the "most alarming military escalation" in the war.
