= Al Bayda offensive =

Offensive of the Yemeni civil war

- Part of the Yemeni Civil War (2014–present) and Marib Campaign
- Map of the offensive Pro-Houthi Government control Pro-Hadi Government control
Date	17 May – 1 September 2020 (3 months, 2 weeks and 1 day)
Location	Al Bayda Governorate, Yemen
Result	Houthi victory
Territorial changes	Houthi forces capture Qaifah, Wald Rabi and Al-Quraishyah districts from Jihadist forces.; Houthi forces seize 80% of Al Bayda Governorate.

Belligerents
(Yemen) Supreme Political Council: Houthi movement	Cabinet of Yemen: (borderless) Security Forces (pro-Hadi)	al-Qaeda: al-Qaeda in the Arabian Peninsula; Islamic State: Yemen Province

Commanders and leaders
Unknown	(Yemen) Brig. Gen. Abdulrab Al-Asbahi (Chief of the Bayda military command)	Abu Al-Walid Al-Adani † (ISIS Emir in Qifah District)

Strength
Unknown	Unknown	Unknown

Casualties and losses
60 casualties (Acc. Hadi Government)	Unknown	250 casualties 10 captured (Acc. Houthi)

The Al Bayda offensive began in late July 2020 with the restart of military operations by Houthis forces in Al Bayda Governorate, during the Second Yemeni Civil War against forces of Al-Qaeda in Yemen, the Islamic State in Yemen and military forces loyal to the Government of Abd Rabbuh Mansur Al-Hadi.

== Prelude ==
In early 2020, Houthi forces were achieving territorial gains in al-Jawf Governorate and Marib along the main highway that links those governorates, with the aim of controlling the Bayda–Marib axis.

== The battle ==
On 15 May, clashes broke out in al-Bayda between Houthi forces and pro-Hadi government forces. The latter claimed the deaths and injuries of Houthi militants, but did not give specific numbers.

On 21 June, Houthis-led forces fought its way in the Baydha Governorate, with the aim on reaching Mahilia area and attack Marib by the South. According to Pro-Hadi government media the Houthi offensive on Al-Nahma area, Mahliyah District of Marib, left tribesmen loyal to the government and soldiers in a dire situation of being attacked from the South.

On 30 June, Houthi forces made further advances on the north of Bayda and the south of Marib, seizing 400 km^{2} of terrain and inflicting 250 killed, wounded and captured Pro-Hadi Government forces.

On 12 August, Houthi sources reported advances on the Marib front against ISIS and Al-Qaeda forces located in the southeast of Marib and Saudi led forces in the southwest.

On 19 August, the spokesperson of the Houthi movement, Gen. Yahya al-Sari, said that after military operations the districts of Walad Rabi and Quraishiyah were captured by Houthi forces. According to al-Sari Houthi forces seized 1,000 km^{2} of terrain from control of Jihadist groups (Al-Qaeda and Islamic State in Yemen), inflicted 250 killed, wounded and captured whilst destroying 12 enemy bases.

On 22 August, Houthi media revealed the advances made by Houthi fighters against Al-Qaeda and Islamic State forces in Bayda. According to Yemeni media Houthi fighters seized M47 Dragon missiles, M2 Browning machine guns and supplies of the World Food Programme from jihadist forces.

== Aftermath ==
On 23 September 2021, Houthi forces said they captured three districts from Al-Bayda governorate effectively controlling the province. The Ministry of Defense of the Houthi government dubbed the result as a "strategic victory" over Al-Qaeda and ISIS-Y.
