= Harib =

Harib also spelled as Hareeb (Arabic: حارب) may refer to:

== Given name ==
- Harib (name)

== Places ==
- Harib Al Qaramish District, Ma'rib Governorate, Yemen
- Harib District, Ma'rib Governorate, Yemen

== People ==
- Khamis Harib, Emirati cyclist who competed at the 1992 Summer Olympics
- Mohammed Saeed Harib (born 1978), Emirati animator
- Harib Al-Saadi (born 1990), Omani footballer
- Harib Al-Habsi (born 1986), Omani footballer
- Harib Abdalla (born 2002), Emirati footballer
- Ali Abdullah Harib Al-Habsi (born 1981), Omani footballer
