= Mahdi Maqula =

Former Yemeni military officer

- مهدي مقولة
- Born: Beit al-Ahmar, Sanhan and Bani Bahlul district, Sanaa Governorate
- Military career
- Allegiance: Yemen (1990s–2014) (Houthis) Houthi-controlled Yemen (2014–2017)
- Branch: Yemeni Land Forces
- Service years: 1990s–2017
- Rank: Major General
- Unit: 31st Armoured Brigade
- Commands: Southern Military Region (1999–2012)
- Conflicts: Al-Qaeda insurgency in Yemen; Battle of Zinjibar (2011–2012); Battle of Dofas; Yemeni civil war (2014–present); Battle of Sanaa (2017)

Mahdi Maqula (Note: Arabic: مهدي مقولة) is a former Yemeni military officer. A close ally of former President Ali Abdullah Saleh, he held the position of Southern Military Region commander of the Yemeni Armed Forces from 1999 until 2012, during which he was accused of corruption. During the Yemeni revolution, Maqula was one the highest-ranking military officers who retained their support for Saleh. At the same time, his Southern Military Region was involved in the conflict to evict Ansar al-Sharia, an Islamist group linked to al-Qaeda in the Arabian Peninsula (AQAP), from territory they had captured quickly in the south, the most notable engagement being the Battle of Zinjibar, which his own 31st Armoured Brigade participated in. Maqula received criticism for his handling of the conflict, and was eventually removed as southern commander in March 2012 by Saleh's replacement, President Abdrabbuh Mansur Hadi.

== Background ==
Maqula was born in Beit al-Ahmar, a village in the Sanhan and Bani Bahlul district of Sanaa Governorate. He comes from the same birthplace and tribe (Hashid) of President Ali Abdullah Saleh. Through their friendship, along with Saleh's policy of Sanhan tribal patronage, Maqula became a senior member of his security apparatus and one of his closest friends and allies.

From 1999 until 2012, he served as the commander of the Southern Military Region of the Yemeni Armed Forces. In May 2009, reports emerged of the Yemeni government seeking to replace Maqula as Southern commander with Saleh's son, Tareq. This was later discredited as Saleh toured the 31st Armoured Brigade base with Maqula.

During this period, Maqula was frequently criticized by the political opposition on accusations of corruption, specifically for large-scale land grabbing. Journalist Zakaria Alkamali claimed that the amount of land Maqula owned was "equivalent to the size of Qatar or Bahrain." Years prior to 2011, a report to the President written by two ministers which listed Maqula as among 15 officials in the south recommended to be dismissed in order to curb popular discontent had mysteriously disappeared after being submitted and was never brought to the public.

== Yemeni revolution and al-Qaeda takeover ==
During the Yemeni revolution of 2011, Maqula emerged as one of Saleh's most staunchest and highest-ranking allies in the military in the face of protests calling for him to step down. He confirmed his backing of Saleh soon after General Ali Mohsen al-Ahmar, commander of the Northwest Military Region and 1st Armoured Division, declared his defection to the opposition. By the end of March, he was the only commander among the four military regions to still support for Saleh. In April, he ordered a raid on the al-Thulaya Institute for Military Sciences in Aden after its head along with numerous other military officers declared support for the revolution.

The revolution coincided with the al-Qaeda in the Arabian Peninsula-linked Islamist group Ansar al-Sharia's emergence and takeover of numerous areas in southern Yemen, including Zinjibar, the capital of Abyan Governorate. Maqula headed the forces of the Southern Military Region as well as his own 31st Armoured Brigade in the Battle of Zinjibar to reclaim the city. Maqula received substantial criticism, even from within the military, for a "halfhearted effort" against the militants in Abyan. Army officers privately accused him of corruption, hindering the delivery of supplies and reinforcements to units at the frontlines of Zinjibar, and ignoring the directives of other officers, mostly those from the south.

On 20 June 2011, amid a spate of assassinations against military officers in Aden, Maqula was the target of a car bombing near his house, which he managed to escape unharmed. A pro-revolution army general accused Maqula of directing the assassinations against other officers he was in conflict with in order to "drown Aden in a sea of blood". Months later, a vehicle convoy carrying Maqula along with Defense Minister Mohammed Nasser Ahmed drove over an alleged al-Qaeda landmine near the town of al-Kawd in Abyan. Neither officials were harmed, though two soldiers were killed and four were wounded.

In a July 2011 conversation with the 14 October newspaper, Maqula pledged that Aden would not fall to Ansar al-Sharia, and reported that a cordon had been set up by the army around Zinjibar in order to prevent the spread of the militants. Praising the military units involved, specifically the 25th Mechanized Brigade, he said that the situation in Abyan was under control and claimed that his command was capable of storming Zinjibar but is deciding not to in order to prevent Ansar al-Sharia from starting a guerilla war, which would greatly damage the city. Later in the month, through a phone call interview with Asharq al-Awsat, 25th Mechanized Brigade commander Mohammed al-Sawmali, in charge of one of the only army units still holding out in Zinjibar, criticized Maqula for not following through with his promises of sending reinforcements to break the siege on his brigade.

One of the first decisions of Abdrabbuh Mansur Hadi, the newly inaugurated President of Yemen after Saleh agreed to step down, was to replace Maqula with Salem Ali Qatan as the commander of the Southern Military Region and 31st Armoured Brigade. Maqula initially resisted the move as he felt his tenure was "overlooked", claiming that he would only step down with the confirmation of General Ahmar, who held substantially more tribal influence in the country. He eventually accepted the decision by 3 March 2012, with him being named the Deputy Chief of Staff for Human Resources instead of being dismissed entirely. Upon the assassination of Qatan in a June 2012 suicide bombing, Maqula hailed him as a martyr for leading the offensive which liberated Abyan in a 26 September article.

=== Alleged collusion with al-Qaeda ===
Maqula was accused of aiding an Ansar al-Sharia attack on army forces at the Dofas checkpoint near Zinjibar in March 2012 which killed hundreds of soldiers. Several officers in the army alleged that, upon Qatan being announced as his successor, Maqula and other allied officers began smuggling equipment, including high-quality sniper scopes and artillery, out of the regional command's warehouse and selling it. They claimed that this equipment was later used by the militants in the attack, just as Maqula finally left office.

Thousands of protestors in Aden demanded that Maqula be held responsible for the attack. In an interview with CNN, Maqula denied accusations that he or any other elements in the military were aiding Ansar al-Sharia, and urged the sending of more reinforcements to Abyan to counter the militants.

Emirati newspaper al-Bayan reported on 11 March 2012 that an investigative committee headed by Deputy Chief of Staff Ali Mohammad Salah concluded that Maqula had "supported the militants with weapons and helped them to capture military positions in the southern governorate of Abyan."

== Later activities ==
On 17 March 2013, Maqula was met with protests while giving a speech at the base of the 133rd Infantry and Artillery Brigade. During the speech, which centered on the National Dialogue Conference, he referred to Saleh as if he was still the President, leading to agitation among the soldiers which forced him to return to Sanaa on short notice in a helicopter.

On 10 April 2013, Maqula was named as among six military officers chosen to comprise a specialized advisory group for the military's chief-of-staff.

=== Civil war ===
According to David Hirst of the Middle East Eye, Maqula was present in an August 2014 meeting in Sanaa between a delegation from the United Arab Emirates, Saleh's son and then-ambassador to the UAE, Ahmed, and two senior members of the Houthis, Saleh Habra and Muhammad Miftah, during which they conspired for the Houthi-led takeover of Yemen.

On 7 September 2015, airstrikes launched by the Saudi-led coalition targeted Maqula's house in Beit al-Ahmar, part of Houthi-controlled Yemen. No casualties were reported.

Upon the death of Major General Ali bin al-Jaifi in the Sanaa funeral airstrike in October 2016, Maqula took his role as the commander of the Saleh-aligned faction of the Strategic Reserve Forces, which had previously been the Republican Guard. He retained this role until December 2017, when the Houthi-Saleh alliance broke down.
