= Battle of Dofas =

Militants attacks on Yemeni army posts

2012 Dofas attack
- Part of the Battle of Zinjibar
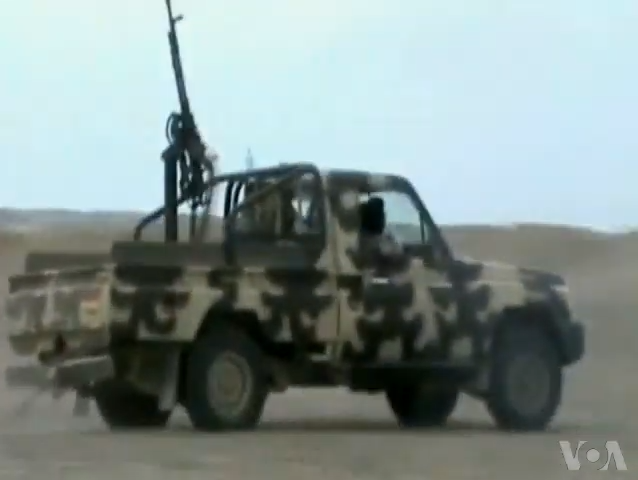
- An army technical looted by Ansar al-Sharia during the raids
Date	4 March 2012; 14 years ago
Location	Dofas and al-Kawd, Abyan Governorate, Yemen
Result	Ansar al-Sharia victory: Significant casualties inflicted on the Yemeni Army, particularly the 39th Armoured Brigade; Militants capture several pieces of military equipment, including a tank

Belligerents
Al-Qaeda in the Arabian Peninsula	Yemen; Supported by: United States

Commanders and leaders
Nasir al-Wuhayshi; Qasim al-Raymi; Jalal Baleedi	Mohammed Nasser Ahmed; (Yemen) Mahdi Maqula

Units involved
Ansar al-Sharia	Yemeni Armed Forces; Yemeni Land Forces; Southern Military Region; 39th Armored Brigade; 115th Infantry Brigade; 119th Infantry Brigade; Republican Guard; Special Forces

Strength
55–65 fighters	Unknown

Casualties and losses
32 militants killed	187 killed, 135 wounded, 73 captured

On 4 March 2012, militants from Ansar al-Sharia, an Islamist group linked to al-Qaeda in the Arabian Peninsula, launched an attack on Yemeni military installations in the adjacent towns of Dofas and al-Kawd in Abyan Governorate, Yemen. The two towns had been major fighting grounds in the battle for the nearby city of Zinjibar since the militants seized the city the previous year.

The militants launched a three-pronged attack at dawn on three army brigades stationed the cities, first attacking from the east before opening another front on the north. Utilizing suicide bombers, car bombs, mortars, artillery and gunfire, the militants eventually managed to drive out the 39th Armoured Brigade from their cannon and artillery base in Dofas, where they seized troves of army equipment including heavy weaponry such as artillery and tanks which they turned on the soldiers. After reinforcements were sent from Aden, Yemeni forces under supervision of United States military advisors fought a five-hour battle with the militants before they withdrew.

The attack killed 185 soldiers, the most in a single engagement since the army began fighting Ansar al-Sharia. Many of the deaths were attributed to poor medical care due to overfilled hospitals; many of the soldiers were treated in administrative offices and waiting rooms. A further 135 soldiers were wounded, while the militants, of whom 32 died in the attack, claimed to have fled with large supplies of military equipment, including one tank. The stolen equipment, along with 73 soldiers captured by the attackers, were displayed during a parade in the nearby Ansar al-Sharia-controlled city of Ja'ar. The soldiers were released by Ansar al-Sharia on 29 April.

The army defeat drew outrage from the Yemeni public and condemnation from the government and other international commentators. Protests in reaction to the attack called on the Yemeni government to remove and prosecute military officials loyal to ousted former President Ali Abdullah Saleh, who were accused of negligence or outright collaboration with militants. Protesters and officials specifically accused Saleh loyalist Gen. Mahdi Maqula, the former commander for military forces in southern Yemen, of colluding with the militants due to losing his position days earlier.

== Background ==
The areas of Dofas and al-Kawd are near Zinjibar, the capital of Abyan Governorate, which was taken over in May 2011 by Islamist militant group Ansar al-Sharia. The Yemeni military had been fighting throughout 2011 to regain control of Zinjibar from the group, believed to be an extension of al-Qaeda in the Arabian Peninsula (AQAP), but the battle had been brought to a stalemate. An army artillery battalion stationed at Dofas played a major role in bombarding Ansar al-Sharia positions in Zinjibar and the nearby town of Jaar. The artillery base at Dofas, belonging to the 39th Armored Brigade, also had the role of guarding the 115th Infantry Brigade and 119th Infantry Brigade, which were positioned in al-Kawd along the road to Aden. The base of the 115th Infantry Brigade occupies a strategic position in the outskirts of Zinjibar.

The Arab Spring-inspired uprising in Yemen which allowed Ansar al-Sharia to occupy territory in the south concluded with the instatement of Abdrabbuh Mansur Hadi as the President of Yemen on 25 February 2012, replacing the ousted Ali Abdullah Saleh. International actors believed that Saleh was not entirely interested in combating the Islamist militants the previous year, hoping instead that Hadi would take charge. Hadi had pledged to defeat the militants during his inauguration speech. In response, Ansar al-Sharia launched a string of attacks on military targets throughout the country, including a suicide bombing in Mukalla on Hadi's inauguration day which killed 26 soldiers. After reports emerged of the military preparing to intensify the battle in Zinjibar, Ansar al-Sharia leader Jalal Baleedi gave the army a 10-day ultimatum to withdraw its forces, and announced a "flowing river" of attacks.

On top of combating the militants, the Hadi administration had also set out on restructuring the military, which still contained officers loyal to Saleh who were intent on undermining the new government. One of Hadi's first moves in this regard was to announce the replacement of Saleh loyalist general Mahdi Maqula, commander of the Southern Military Region and the 31st Armored Brigade, on 2 March. Internal complaints accused Maqula of hindering the forces fighting in Zinjibar. Maqula resisted the decision initially, but eventually relinquished his position to his replacement, General Salem Ali Qatan, hours after the raids took place.

== Battle ==
The attacks began during the early hours of 4 March, while most soldiers were asleep in their tents. Ansar al-Sharia targeted the 39th Armored Brigade artillery base at Dofas, and the forward operating base of the 115th Infantry Brigade and 119th Infantry Brigade along the road at al-Kawd. Rather than approaching from the hotly contested frontlines, the group of 55 to 65 Ansar al-Sharia fighters who conducted the raids instead went across the desert through a mountain trail and attacked from the rear, where reconnaissance was minimal. The militants were aided by a sandstorm occurring in the area at the time.

At around 4:00 a.m. local time, the militants reached Dofas. Two suicide car bombers led the initial assault simultaneously, one blowing up at the 115th and 119th Infantry Brigade base and another at the 39th Armored Brigade base further south. Mortar and rocket attacked followed before militant fighters stormed the bases entirely. Ansar al-Sharia forces had attacked the Dofas base from the east before another contingent of fighters began attacking from the north as a "one-two punch". As the 115th and 119th Infantry Brigade's fought the militants at their own base, they soon came under intense artillery fire from the Dofas base, which at that point had been taken over by Ansar al-Sharia. The militants captured soldiers and looted military equipment as they went, utilizing "armored vehicles, artillery pieces, assault rifles and rockets" from the stormed base to attack troops in al-Kawd.

Facing an attack from two directions, the 115th and 119th Infantry Brigade leaders contacted the military in Aden to request backup. An official said that the "reinforcement response was too slow," partly due to the sandstorms. The reinforcements, including tanks and personnel from the Republican Guard and Special Forces, had arrived at around 10:00 a.m., hours after the initial request. Intense clashes proceeded to take place at Dofas for five hours as the military fought to regain the base, a counteroffensive which was "directly supervised by the United States military advisors" according to Yemeni military officials speaking to Yemen Times. Rather than holding Dofas, Ansar al-Sharia instead opted to withdraw, having captured several soldiers and pieces of military equipment.

== Losses ==
The attack killed 185 government soldiers according to a military official. Many of the casualties were wounded soldiers who had succumbed to their injuries in an Aden military hospital due to a lack of proper medical care. Doctors were forced to treat some soldiers in administrative offices and waiting rooms in the hospital. 110 of the dead soldiers were located in the military hospital, while the other 75 were later found dumped in a nearby desert. Some of the bodies of soldiers recovered were missing their heads and bore multiple stab wounds. The military hospital morgue was so filled with bodies that some had to be stored in vegetable freezers in a military compound for lack of space. Two security officials told CNN that at least 135 soldiers were injured during the battle. Initial reports claimed that Ansar al-Sharia had captured 55 soldiers during the attack, but later statements by the group claimed that 73 were captured.

According to the Associated Press, 32 Ansar al-Sharia militants were killed during the attack. The military indicated that airstrikes had destroyed equipment seized by Ansar al-Sharia, however the group wrote in a statement that they had seized a tank, anti-aircraft weapons, a rocket launcher, rockets, 11 Kalashnikov assault rifles, three military vehicles and "a large amount of ammunition". It also claimed that it had destroyed two tanks and burned an ammunition store.

== Reactions ==
The attack resulted in a surge of accusations that Saleh loyalists in the military had been negligent, unwilling to or directly colluding with militants. In the days after the attack, tens of thousands of people protested in several Yemeni cities blaming Saleh-installed military commanders for the defeat, demanding that President Hadi prosecute them. Several officials, as well as Southern Movement leader Mohammad Badaib, alleged that Maqula had given the militants weapons which they used in the attack. During an interview with CNN, Maqula denied the accusations against him and other Saleh localists, stating that "military units in the area need reinforcement."

During a meeting with British Foreign Office minister for the Middle East and North Africa Alistair Burt, President Hadi renewed his pledge to combat the militants, saying "the confrontation will continue until we are rid of the last terrorist, whether in Abyan or elsewhere." Presidential spokesperson Yahya al-Arassi said that "the president is serious on combating al Qaeda. He knows the dangers they possess and will not stop until they are defeated." Gen. Qatan, Maqula's replacement, told his soldiers that the battle against Ansar al-Sharia had not started yet but that "the coming days will be decisive and will teach them a harsh lesson."

US Secretary of State Hillary Clinton issued a statement condemning the "heinous" attack and expressing condolences to the victims, stating that it "illustrates AQAP's complete disregard for human life". She further wrote "the United States will continue to support President Hadi and the Yemeni people as they work to realize their aspirations for a brighter and more prosperous future." Pentagon Press Secretary George Little said the US was "very concerned" by the attack but also downplayed its importance, saying "the Yemeni government has faced challenges in certain parts of the country for some time so I wouldn't necessarily read anything at this point into the stability of the Yemeni government." The United Nations Security Council and the European Union each published statements condemning the attack.

== Aftermath ==
On 5 March, the militants hosted a parade in the streets of Ja'ar celebrating their victory and displaying their loot. Also displayed were the soldiers captured during the attack. On 7 March, Ansar al-Sharia released a statement threatening the lives of 73 soldiers they had captured during the attack unless its imprisoned members were released. The message urged relatives of the soldiers to lobby the US ambassador to Yemen and President Hadi on the soldiers behalves. Both Ansar al-Sharia and the International Committee of the Red Cross confirmed that a small team of medical personnel team had managed to gain permission from the militants to treat 12 soldiers at a makeshift hospital in Ja'ar. The soldiers were described as being in stable condition. On 19 April, France 24 released an exclusive video of its journalists in Ja'ar viewing the prisoners with permission of the militants. On 23 April, Ansar al-Sharia distributed posters and made statements across Abyan threatening to execute the soldiers in batches of 10 starting on 30 April. However, all 73 soldiers were released by the group on 29 April after a ceremony in Ja'ar attended by local journalists, tribal mediators, human rights activists and the soldiers' relatives as well as top militants leaders including Qasim al-Raymi. A statement released by the group stated that Nasir al-Wuhayshi had authorized the release after three days of negotiation with tribal elders and senior clerics including tribal sheikh Tariq al-Fadhli.

== See also ==
- 2012 Unity Day parade rehearsal bombing
- 2012 Abyan offensive
