= Asdas =

- Village
- Location in Yemen
- Coordinates: 15°46′N 45°5′E
- Country: Yemen
- Governorate: Ma'rib Governorate
- Time zone: UTC+6.30 (MST)

Asdas is a village in the northern part of the Ma'rib Governorate of Yemen. It is located northwest of the city of Ma'rib. It is roughly halfway between Ma'rib and Al Hazm to the northwest. Yasaihar is one of the nearest settlements to the northwest on the way to Al Hazm.
