= Nihm Offensive =

Military operation in the District of Nihm

Coordinates: 15°45′N 44°30′E

- Part of the Yemeni Crisis and the Yemeni Civil War (2014–present)
Date	16 December 2015 – 31 January 2020 (4 years, 1 month, 2 weeks and 1 day)
Location	Nihm District (Sanaa), Yemen
Result	Houthi victory
Territorial changes	Houthi fighters recaptured the entire Sanaa province including Nihm district from the Hadi Government.

Belligerents
(Yemen) Supreme Political Council: Houthis; Pro-Saleh forces (2015–17); Republican Guard (2015–17)	Hadi government: Pro-Hadi Security forces; Popular Resistance; Saleh loyalist defectors (2017–); Al-Islah

Commanders and leaders
Mohammed Ali al-Houthi; Saleh Ali al-Sammad	(Yemen) Abdul-Rab al-Shadadi † (Yemen) Ali Mohsen al-Ahmar (Yemen) Mohammed Ali Al-Maqdashi

Casualties and losses
280+ killed 33+ captured	Unknown

The Nihm Offensive was a military operation that began in mid-December 2015 in the District of Nihm (40 km east of the capital Sana'a), when government forces took control of "Mas camp" which borders the governorates of Al-Jawf, and Marib. On 19–20 December, government forces coming from Marib and al-Jawf (in the northeast of the capital Sana'a), took control of the 312th Armored Brigade camp, and 334th Armored Brigade camp. Government forces faced fierce resistance that lasted until February 2016, when they were able to take control of the 312th Armored Corps camp.

== 2015 ==
On 16 December, government forces took control of Fardhat Nihm from Saleh/Houthi forces. Clashes continued for approximately ten days until government forces took full control of Fardhat Nihm. After officially announcing on 26 December full control of Fardhat Nihm, government forces officially declared that they had broken into one of the first districts of the Sana'a Governorate, which is approximately 60 kilometers from Amanat Al Asimah (the capital).

== 2016 ==
On 10 February 2016, approximately a month and half after the capture of Fardhat Nihm, government forces were on the outskirts of the town of Nihm. Houthi forces and their allies called for the Bani Hushaysh tribe to stop any further advances and to recapture the lost town. After a few days of clashes, Houthi forces were able to regain the town of Nihm with help from the Bani Hashish tribe. After months of a stalemate, in August 2016, Government forces captured the strategic mountains of Al-Manara, and Salifih al-Faqih overlooking the villages of Bani Faraj in the Nihm District, which resulted in 17 deaths to Houthi Forces and Allies, and over 25 airstrikes in Houthi Strongholds according to Government forces.

On 7 October 2016, Abdul-Rab al-Shadadi was killed in an artillery strike during an offensive east of the city of Sana'a by Houthi fighters.

== 2017 ==
On 9 March 2017, government forces took control of the Al-Arakat Dam, and Mount Al-Jarjur which overlook the village of Al-Arqan and several hills in Mount Al-Safina. Furthermore, government forces reported significant advances in the village of Bani Faraj, on the outskirts of Nihm district. On 10 May 2017, clashes spilled over from Al-Jawf into the Arhab District in the Nahran area, which is located in-between the Arhab and Nihm district. According to government officials, on the week of 31 October, over two hundred Houthis were killed in Nihm.

== 2018 ==
On 19 January 2018, Mount Al-Qarn and Mount Al-Dabbayeb were captured by government forces from Houthi rebels, and according to many military sources; government forces control most of Nihm's highlands that overlook Amanat Al Asimah.

On 27 February, according to pro-Hadi force, at least 63 Houthis militants had been killed in heavy clashes with government forces in Nihm district. The Houthis mounted an offensive against government forces along the rugged mountains in Nihm, triggering fierce clashes amid heavy air strikes by Saudi-led coalition fighter jets. The pro-Hadi source said government troops pushed Houthis back as the coalition's fighter jets destroyed their military reinforcements that came from the capital, and hit their gatherings in Nihm. 17 Houthis were killed in the fighting between 25 February and 1 March. 33 Houthis militants, including four military commanders were captured. Among Houthis deaths were three field commanders. On 3 March, Saudi-led coalition warplanes waged four raids on Bani Matar in Sana'a province, caused huge damage to citizens’ houses and properties.

On 4 March, Houthis dispatched their "forces of death" to the Nihm battlefield to block government forces, and slow their advance towards Sana'a. Pro-Hadi source claimed that the government forces captured the Al Zelzal mountain, and escalated attacks on Houthis along other hillsides that overlook Arhab district. However, Houthis officials rejected loyalist claims of advancing in Sana'a’s Arhab District. It was reported that more than 55 people died and dozens more were wounded on both sides.

On 6 March, Pro-Hadi media claimed that government forces have taken control of the last Houthi-held military sites in Nihm, and have claimed that fighting has now reached Dhabwa area, that it is in the middle of Nihm and Arhab District.

== 2020 ==
On 31 January 2020, Houthi armed forces spokesman Gen. Yahya Sarea announced that Houthi forces managed to liberate roughly 2,500 km^{2} of territory including the city of Naham, and parts of the governorates of Al-Jawf and Marib, from Saudi-led forces. The coalition forces immediately denied this claim, claiming victory and progress in these areas. “In the Nahm district, east of the capital Sanaa, the National Army managed to regain control of a number of Houthi-controlled areas,” Majli said.
