= Abdul-Rab al-Shadadi =

Yemeni general (1963–2016)

- Born: Abdul-Rab al-Shadadi; 1963; Al Abdiyah District, Marib Governorate, Yemen
- Died: 7 October 2016 (aged 52–53) near Sanaa, Yemen
- Military career
- Allegiance: Yemen
- Branch: Yemeni Army
- Rank: Major general
- Commands: Third Military Region
- Conflicts: Yemeni Civil War; Nihm Offensive

Abdul-Rab al-Shadadi (1963 - 7 October 2016) was a Yemeni Army major general who served President Abdrabbuh Mansur Hadi. He was the commander of the Third Military Region, which has its headquarters in the city of Marib. Al-Shadadi was killed in an artillery strike during an offensive east of the city of Sanaa by Houthi fighters. He is among the most senior members of the Hadi government's forces to have been killed in the Yemeni Civil War.
