= 5th Military Region =

5th Military Region may refer to:

- 5th Military Region (People's Army of Vietnam)
- 5th Military Region (Yemen)
