= Amin al-Waeli =

Yemeni major general and politician

- Born: 1962; Wasab district, Dhamar Governorate
- Died: 27 March 2021 (aged 58–59); Marib
- Allegiance: Yemen
- Branch: Yemeni Army
- Rank: Major general
- Commands: Sixth Military Region
- Battles / wars: Yemeni Civil War; Battle of Marib

Major general Amin Abdullah al-Waeli (1962 – 27 March 2021) was a Yemeni military officer and held the rank of major general. He served as commander of the 6th military region of Yemeni Army of the internationally-recognized government forces. He is among the most senior members of the government forces to have been killed in the Yemeni Civil War. He was killed during battles with Houthis in Marib in 2021.
