= Military regions (Yemen) =

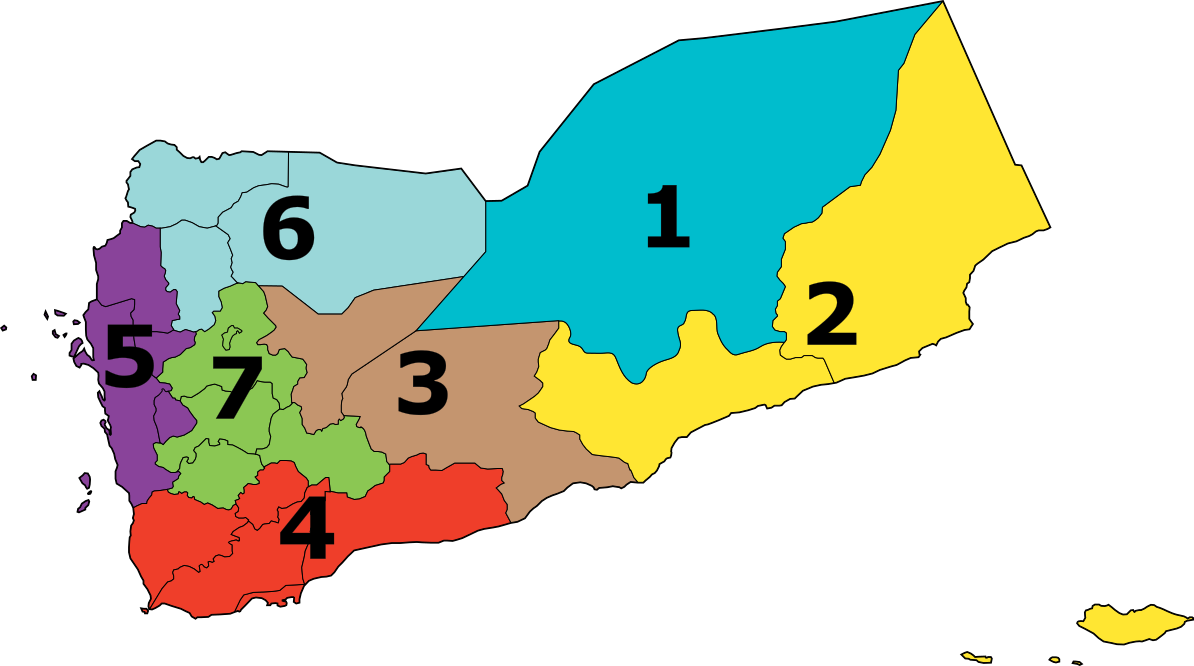
Divisions of the Yemeni military regions as of 2013.

The military regions of Yemen are 7 regions in which the Yemeni army is distributed. Each military region shares joint military units and formations, in addition to local military academies and installations.

The theater of military operations is represented in seven military regions with the 75th military brigades (including the 13th military brigades in the Defense Reserve and Strategic Reserve). The forces and combat units of the military regions consist of 11 operational axes, 9 mechanized infantry brigades, 11 armored brigades, two border guard brigades, and 23 brigades. Infantry, 2 marine infantry brigades, 3 naval bases, 6 air defense brigades, 5 air bases, 2 mountain infantry brigades, 3 aviation brigades, an artillery brigade, and 2 (artillery/missile) brigades.

== Background ==
Despite the unification of Yemen in 1990, the armies of both the northern Yemen Arab Republic and the southern People's Democratic Republic of Yemen remained independent of one another for the next four years as each side remained suspicious of each other. The end of the Yemeni civil war in 1994 saw the victory of the north and the emergence of two dominant power centers in the country, President Ali Abdullah Saleh as well as General Ali Mohsen al-Ahmar, both members of the influential Sanhan tribe. With the government now unified, the Yemeni Armed Forces underwent a reorganization process which saw it become a force structured primarily for preventing and neutralizing internal threats to Saleh's regime rather than external defense.

== History ==
=== Saleh era ===
From 1994 until 2013, the army was organized into five military districts or regions; the Northwest Military Region, Central Military Region (which included the capital of Sanaa), Middle Military Region, Southern Military Region and Eastern Military Region, each roughly equating to a specific geographical area of Yemen. Each military region was headed by a high-ranking general, who was in charge of military activities in their respective area and supervised the brigades and camps based there. The de jure system had it that, if a military unit was operating in region it was not assigned to, its operational command would be shifted to the jurisdiction of the relevant regional commander. In reality, Saleh's personal Republican Guard and Ahmar's northwest-based 1st Armoured Division often functioned independently wherever it operated, and still "retained administrative and logistical authority" in cases where it did not, creating a frequent source of frustration for the commanders.

The concentration of units in each region strongly correlated to their importance in maintaining power, such as the regions containing Sanaa and Aden, where security forces were usually deployed to "break up protests, infiltrate opposition groups, and manipulate social movements". The weakness of the central state outside of the major population centres resulted in each of the five regions effectively functioning as autonomous states. A United States Department of State report noted that regional commanders functioned as "the final authority in nearly every aspect of regional governance. In practice, they behave like tribal sheikhs and super-governors, parceling out new schools, water projects, and money. Despite periodic efforts to integrate military units, the Commanders recruit largely from regional tribes." Commanders often enriched themselves by hiring ghost soldiers, so much so that most brigades were staffed by one-third to one-half with non-existent soldiers.

In 1999 and 2000, Saleh began to position for his son, Ahmed Ali Abdullah Saleh, to succeed him as president, angering much of the Sanhani elite within the military. An internal split in allegiances materialized between those loyal to Saleh and those who instead allied to Ahmar, who utilized his position as the longtime-Northwest region commander to create an extensive tribal patronage network, thus retaining the support of the Northwest and Eastern military regions. Among other measures to secure the dominance of his faction over the security forces, Saleh appointed his half-brother as head of the Office of the Commander-in-Chief, which functioned as an instrument to communicate directly with the military including regional commanders while bypassing the Ministry of Defense. The Northwest Military Region was the army's main theater of operations during the Houthi insurgency throughout the 2000s, which allowed Saleh to indirectly weaken his internal rival as he built up the strength of forces allied to him.

==== Yemeni revolution ====
The rivalry in the armed forces eventually came to a head during the Yemeni revolution. On 21 March 2011, three days after pro-Saleh soldiers massacred over 50 peaceful protesters in Sanaa, Ahmar announced his defection to the opposition, declaring that troops under his command would protect protesters from the regime and supporting popular demands for Saleh to resign. He was soon followed by numerous other commanders within the military, including Eastern Military Region commander Muhammad Ali Ahmar and Central Military Region commander Saif al-Baqri. These defections resulted in Saleh losing control over most forces in the northwest and east. Major protest centers such as Sanaa and Taiz were the site of clashes between pro and anti-Saleh military forces. Regardless of these events, it was the Southern Military Region which experienced the most fighting during this period, as it battled militants from al-Qaeda in the Arabian Peninsula (AQAP) and its local front, Ansar al-Sharia, which took advantage of the chaos to seize several cities in Abyan and Shabwah governorates.

=== Restructuring ===
In February 2012, Abdrabbuh Mansur Hadi officially took power as president in accordance to the agreed upon internationally backed deal to have Saleh relinquish power. During the first months of his tenure, Hadi's began restricting the military in order to curb the influence of Saleh and personnel still loyal to him. By April, he had appointed new commanders to four of the five military regions, with the exception of the Northwest region.

On 19 December 2012, Hadi announced a major restructuring of the military. Among the changes included a redistricting of the military regions, which were increased from five to seven, and the disbandment of the Republican Guard and 1st Armoured Division, which were to have their units be integrated into the regional command structure. The Northwest Military Region was split into two separate regions along with the Eastern Military Region, which was divided into the 1st Military Region, constituting upper Hadhramaut Governorate, and the 2nd Military Region, which contains lower Hadhramaut and Al Mahrah Governorate. The new regions and their headquarters were officially established on 10 April 2013 under Presidential Decree No. 104, as the government announced the commanders heading each of them. The 1st, 2nd, 3rd, and 4th regions, where AQAP had the most concentrated presence, were allocated more resources in order to better fight the insurgency.

== Military regions ==
=== 1994–2013 ===
No	Name	Area
1.	Northwest Military Region	Amran Governorate; Saada Governorate; Al Jawf Governorate; Al Hudaydah Governorate; Hajjah Governorate
2.	Central Military Region	Dhamar Governorate; Al Bayda Governorate; Sanaa Governorate; Ibb Governorate
3.	Middle Military Region	Marib Governorate; Shabwah Governorate
4.	Southern Military Region	Abyan Governorate; Aden Governorate; Dhale Governorate; Lahij Governorate
5.	Eastern Military Region	Hadhramaut Governorate; Al Mahrah Governorate; Socotra Governorate

=== 2013–present ===
No	Name	Area	Headquarters	Commanders
1.	1st Military Region	Northern Hadhramaut Governorate (Wadi Hadhramaut)	Seiyun	Mohammed al-Sawmali (2013–2014); Abdurrahman al-Halili
2.	2nd Military Region	Southern Hadhramaut Governorate (coastal Hadhramaut); Al Mahrah Governorate; Socotra Governorate	Mukalla	Mohsen Nasser Qasim Hassan (2013); Talib Saeed Bargash (2023–present)
3.	3rd Military Region	Marib Governorate; Shabwah Governorate	Marib	Ahmed Saif al Yafai (2013)
4.	4th Military Region	Aden Governorate; Lahij Governorate; Dhale Governorate; Abyan Governorate; Taiz Governorate	Aden	Mahmoud al-Subaihi (2013–2014)
5.	5th Military Region	Al Hudaydah Governorate; Hajjah Governorate	Al Hudaydah	Mohammed Labuza (2013)
6.	6th Military Region	Amran Governorate; Saada Governorate; Al Jawf Governorate	Amran	Mohammed Ali al-Maqdashi (2013–2014); Mohammed al-Hawri (2014)
7.	7th Military Region	Dhamar Governorate; Al Bayda Governorate; Sanaa Governorate; Ibb Governorate	Dhamar	Ali Mohsen Ali Muthana (2013)

==== 1st Military Region ====
Its headquarters is in Seiyun of Hadramawt, eastern Yemen. It is responsible for managing administrative issues of the military units in parts of Hadramawt Governorate, including Seiyun city. The first region was established in 2013. As part of the military restructuring, former president Abdrabbuh Mansur Hadi issued a republication decree to divide the military field into seven regions, including the First Military Region. The region is headquartered in Seiyun and supervises the military units in Al-Wadi and Al-Sahra of Hadramout Governorate.

The region is composed of seven military units and brigades, including; 37th Armored Brigade, 123rd Infantry Brigade and 315th Armored Brigade. Its leadership is:

- Major General Mohammed Abdullah al-Saumali (2013–2014)
- Major General Abdularahman al-Halili (2014–2016)
- Major General Saleh Taimas (21 November 2016– incumbent)

==== 2nd Military Region ====
Its headquarters is in Mukalla, the capital of Hadramawt Governorate, eastern Yemen. The second region was established in 2013. As part of the military restructuring, former president Abdrabbuh Mansur Hadi issued a republication decree to divide the military field into seven regions, including the Second Military Region. The region is headquartered in Mukalla city and supervises the military units south of Hadramout Governorate, al-Maharah and Socotra Governorates. On 22 December 2025, the 2nd Military Region pledged its loyalty to the Southern Transitional Council after its successful takeover of southern Yemen.

The region is composed of nine military units and brigades, including; 123rd Infantry Brigade, 137th Mechanised Infantry Brigade, 27th Mechanised Infantry Brigade. Its leadership is:

- Major General Mohsen Naser Qasem (2013–2015)
- Major General Faraj Salmin Al-Bahsani (2016– 13 August 2022)
- Major General Faiz Mansur Saeed (13 August 2022– incumbent)

==== 3rd Military Region ====
Its headquarters are located in Marib city, the capital of Marib Governorate. The third region was established in 2013 as part of the military restructuring by former president Abdrabbuh Mansur Hadi who issued a republication decree to divide the military field into seven regions, including the Third Military Region. The region is headquartered in Marib city and supervises the military units in Marib and Shabwah Governorates.

The region consists of over 10 military units and brigades, including; 14th Armored Brigade, 107th Infantry Brigade, 312 Armored Brigade, 21 Infantry Brigade, 26th Infantry Brigade. and 13th Infantry Brigade. Its leadership is:

- Major General Ahmed Saif al-Yafiya (2013– 7 April 2015)
- Major General Abdurabu al-Sahdadi (2015– 7 October 2016)
- Major General Adel Hashim al-Qumairi ( 7 October 2016 – 21 January 2017)
- Major General Ahmed Hassan Jubran ( 21 January 2017 – 27 May 2018)
- Major General Faisal Ali ( 27 May 2018 – 11 November 2020)
- Major General Mansour Thawaba ( 11 November 2020– incumbent)

==== 4th Military Region ====
Its headquarters locates in Aden city, the interim capital of Yemen. The 4th region was established in 2013 as part of the military restructuring by former president Abdrabbuh Mansur Hadi who issued a republication decree to divide the military field into seven regions, including the Fourth Military Region. The region is headquartered in Aden city and supervises the military units in Aden, Taiz, Lahj, Abyan, and al-Dhale Governorates.

The region consists of 25 military units and brigades, including; 33rd, 31st, 35th. 22nd and Armored Brigade, 45th, 115, 119, and 111 Infantry Brigades. Its leadership is:

- Major General Mahmoud al-Subaihi (10 April 2013– 7 November 2014)
- Major General Ali Naser Hadi (7 November 2014 – 6 May 2015)
- Major General Saif Saleh al-Dhali (6 May 2015 – 6 July 2015)
- Major General Ahmed Saif al-Yafie ( 6 July 2015– November 2016)
- Major General Fadhel Hassan (22 November 2016– incumbent)

==== 5th Military Region ====
Its headquarters locates in Hudaydah Governorate. The fifth region was established in 2013. As part of the military restructuring, former president Abdrabbuh Mansur Hadi issued a republication decree to divide the military field into seven regions, including the Fifth Military Region. The region is headquartered in Hudaydah city and supervises the military units in Hudaydah and Hajjah Governorates.

The region basically consists of 11 military units and brigades, including; 121 Infantry Brigade, 82 Infantry Brigade, 105 Infantry Brigade, 25 Mechanised Infantry Brigade, 2nd Border Guard Brigade. Its leadership is:

- Major General Mohammed Rajeh Labwzah (2013–2015)
- Major General Tawfiq al-Qiz (2016– 2017)
- Major General Omar Sajaf ( 24 February 2017 – 17 February 2018)
- Major General Yahya Salah (17 February 2018– incumbent)

==== 6th Military Region ====
Its headquarters is in Amran Governorate. The 6th region was established in 2013. On 10 April 2013 President Abdrabbuh Mansur Hadi issued a republication decree to restructure the military field into seven regions, including the 6th Military Region. The region is headquartered in Amran city and supervises the military units in Amran, Saada, and Al-Jawf Governorates.

The region basically consists of 16 military units and formations, including; 310th Armored Brigade, 127 Infantry Brigade, 125 Infantry Brigade, 133 Infantry Brigade, 102 and 101 Infantry Brigades, and 117 Border Guard Brigade. Its leadership is:

- Major General Mohammed Ali Al-Maqdashi (10 April 2013 – 12 July 2014)
- Major General Mohammed al-Hawri (12 July 2014– 2015)
- Major General Amin al-Waeli (2015– 2018)
- Major General Hashim al-Ahmar (2018– 2020)
- Major General Amin al-Waeli (2020– 27 March 2021)
- Major General Omar Sajaf (27 March 2021 – 22 December 2021)
- Major General Haikal Hantaf (2020– incumbent)

==== 7th Military Region ====
Its headquarters is in Dhamar Governorate. The 7th region was established in 2013. On 10 April 2013 President Abdrabbuh Mansur Hadi issued a republication decree to restructure the military field into seven regions, including the 7th Military Region. The region is headquartered in Dhamar city and supervises the military formations in Dhamar, al-Baydah, Sanaa, and Ibb Governorates.

The region basically consists of 7 military brigades, including; 30th Armored Brigade, 9th Infantry Brigade, 55 and 61 Artillery Brigades. Its leadership is:

- Major General Ali Mohsen Ali Muthana (10 April 2013 – 2016)
- Major General Ismael al-Zahzuh (8 November 2016 – 23 August 2017)
- Major General Nasser al-Dhaibani (23 August 2017 – 5 August 2018)
- Major General Mohsen al-Khubi (5 August 2018 – 27 January 2020)
- Major General Ahmed Hassan Jubran (27 January 2020 – 22 December 2021)
- Major General Mohammed Rasam (22 December 2021–incumbent)

== See also ==
- Yemeni Armed Forces
