= Marib district =

Coordinates: 15.6211°N 46.0108°E

Marib District مديرية مَأْرِب
- District
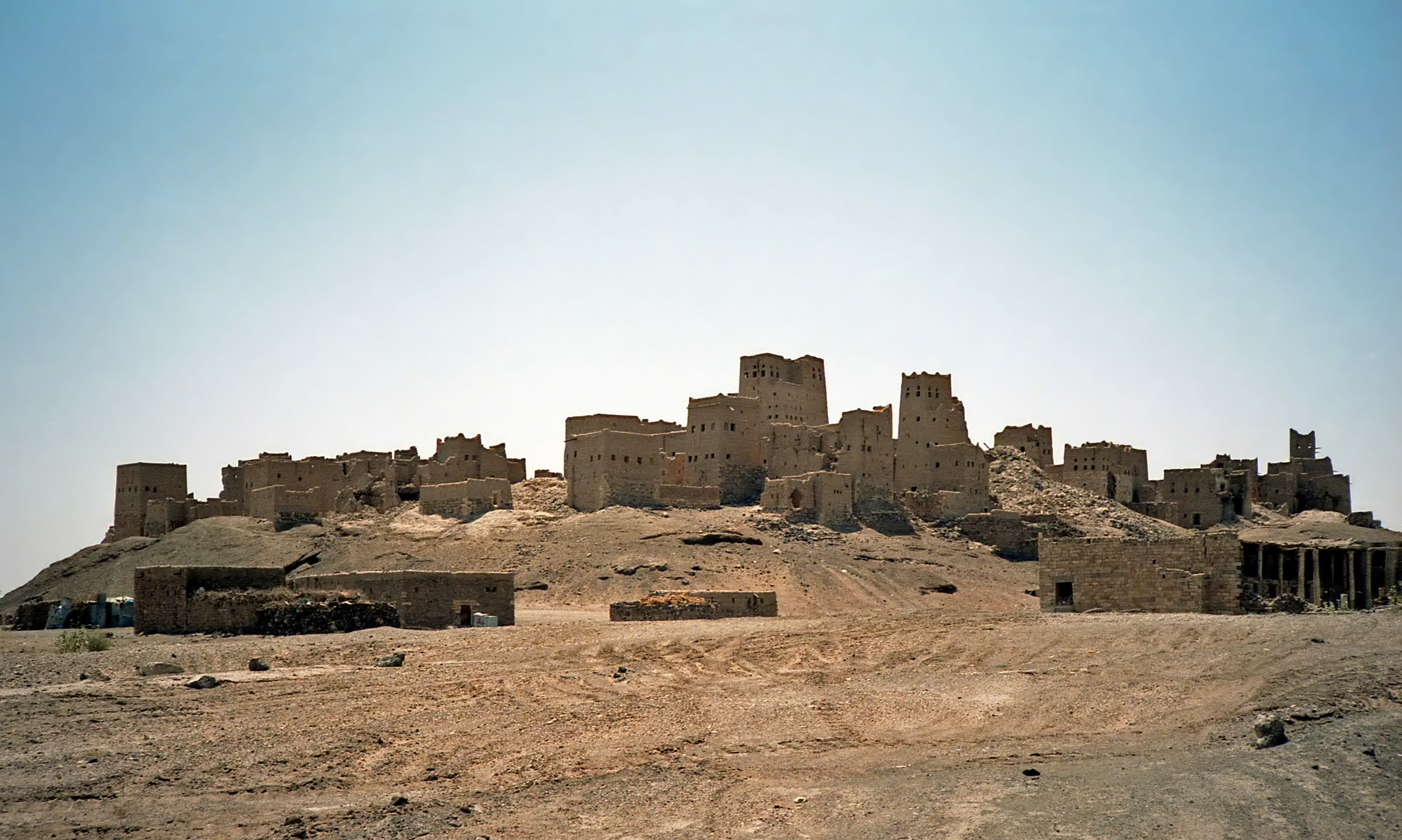
- Ruins of Ancient Ma'rib in Yemen
- Interactive map of Marib District
- Country: Yemen
- Governorate: Ma'rib

Population (2003)
  - Total: 39,495
- Time zone: UTC+3 (Yemen Standard Time)

Marib District (Arabic: مديرية مَأْرِب) is a district of the Ma'rib Governorate, Yemen. As of 2003, the district had a population of 39,495 inhabitants.

On August 7, 2013, a US drone strike in Al-Mil, killed two Civilians including one child according to the report Death by Drone, authored by Radhya Al-Mukatawel and Abdulrasheed Al-Faqih of Mwatana, jointly with the Open Societies Foundations.

== Villages ==
- Asdas
