= Bidbadah district =

Coordinates: 15°30′N 45°00′E

Bidbadah District
- District
- Interactive map of Bidbadah District
- Country: Yemen
- Governorate: Ma'rib

Population (2003)
  - Total: 18,214
- Time zone: UTC+3 (Yemen Standard Time)

Bidbadah District is a district of the Ma'rib Governorate, Yemen. As of 2003, the district had a population of 18,214 inhabitants.
