= Nasser al-Dhaibani =

Yemeni army major general (1968–2021)

Maj.Gen. Nasser Ali al-Dhaibani
- Native name: ناصر علي الذيباني
- Born: 1968
- Died: 2021 (aged 52–53)
- Allegiance: Yemen
- Branch: Yemeni Army
- Rank: Major General
- Commands: Head of the Military Operations Authority of Yemeni Army
- Conflicts: Battle of Marib

Nasser Ali Abdullah al-Dhaibani (1968 – 3 December 2021) was a Yemeni army major general who served as head of the Military Operations Authority of the Yemeni Army. In 2021 he was killed during battles with the Houthis.

== Early life and education ==
General Nasser was born in Al Radma District, Ibb Governorate. He received his basic education in Kuwait, then returned to complete his secondary education in the city of Al Nadera in Ibb Governorate. In 1986 he joined the armed forces and entered the Military College in Sana'a. He also obtained a bachelor's degree from Sana'a University. Then he got a master's degree from the Command and Staff College in the Republic of Sudan.

== Career ==
After graduating from the Military College, he served in the Military Police as company commander, then Deputy Commander for Technical Affairs Department, then in the Office of the Supreme Commander of the Armed Forces, and later in the Military Intelligence.

- Chief of Staff of the 31st Armored Brigade in Aden
- Commander of the 130th Brigade
- Commander of the Serwah Front
- Commander of the 133rd Brigade
- Director of the Department of Military Operations
- Commander of the Seventh Military Region
- Deputy head of the Military Operations Authority
- Commander of the 3rd Military Region
- Head of the Military Operations Authority
