= Rahabah district =

Coordinates: 15°00′N 45°00′E

Rahabah District
- District
- Interactive map of Rahabah District
- Country: Yemen
- Governorate: Ma'rib

Population (2003)
  - Total: 7,441
- Time zone: UTC+3 (Yemen Standard Time)

Rahabah District is a district of the Ma'rib Governorate, Yemen. As of 2003, the district had a population of 7,441 inhabitants.
