= Jabal Murad district =

Coordinates: 15°10′N 45°15′E

Jabal Murad District
- District
- Interactive map of Jabal Murad District
- Country: Yemen
- Governorate: Ma'rib

Population (2003)
  - Total: 10,280
- Time zone: UTC+3 (Yemen Standard Time)

Jabal Murad District is a district of the Ma'rib Governorate, Yemen. As of 2003, the district had a population of 10,280 inhabitants.
