= Al Jubah district =

Al Jubah District الجوبة
- District
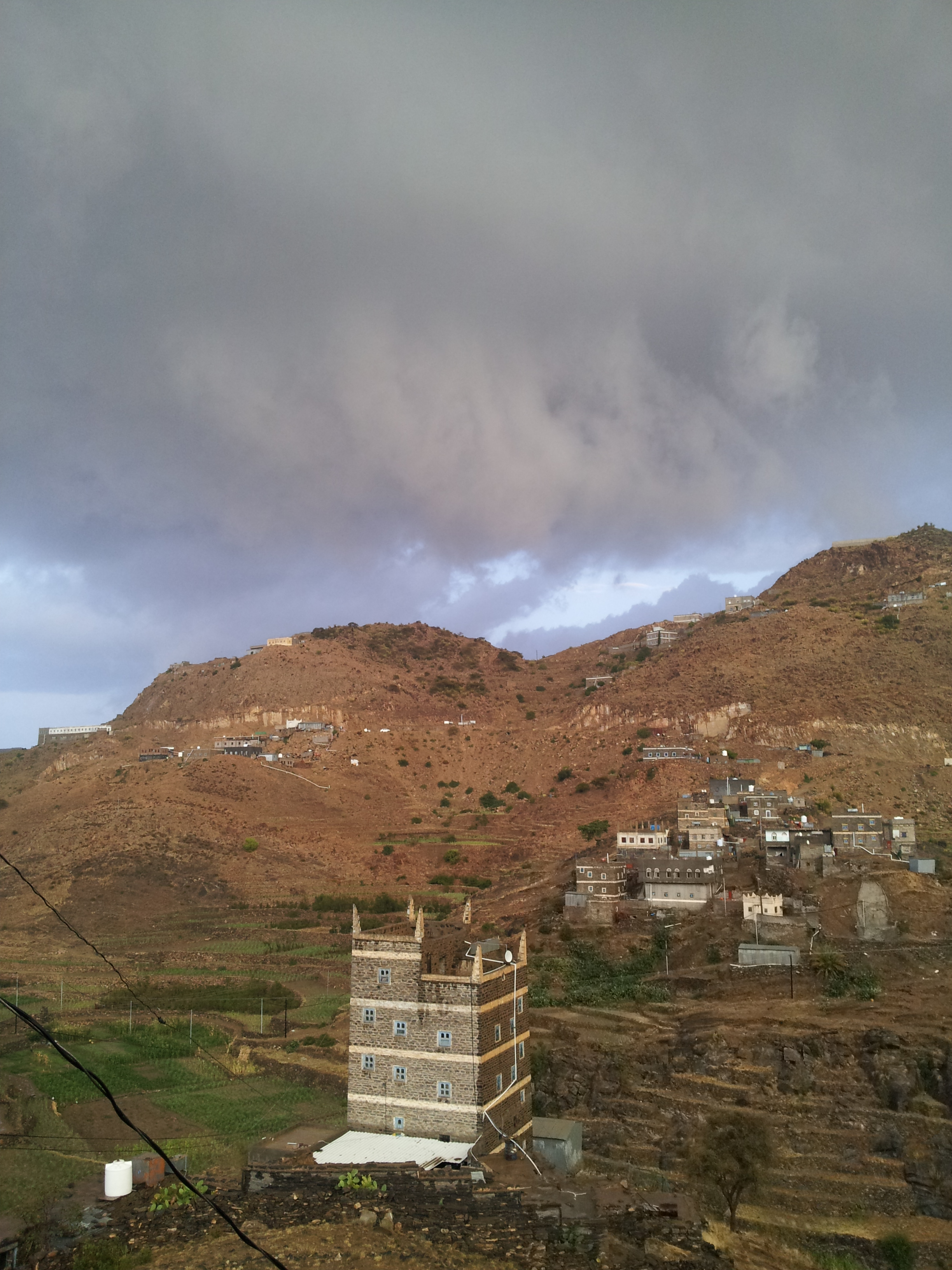

- Location in Yemen
- Coordinates: 15°05′N 45°15′E
- Country: Yemen
- Governorate: Ma'rib

Population (2003)
  - Total: 21,093
- Time zone: UTC+3 (Yemen Standard Time)

Al Jubah District (Arabic: مديرية الجوبة) is a district of the Ma'rib Governorate, Yemen. As of 2003, the district had a population of 21,093 inhabitants.
