= Harab =

Harab هراب
- Village
- Location within Iran
- Coordinates: 37°48′38″N 46°35′17″E
- Country: Iran
- Province: East Azerbaijan
- County: Bostanabad
- Bakhsh: Central
- Rural District: Qurigol

Population (2006)
  - Total: 276
- Time zone: UTC+3:30 (IRST)
  - Summer (DST): UTC+4:30 (IRDT)

Harab (Persian: هراب, also Romanized as Harāb) is a village in Qurigol Rural District, in the Central District of Bostanabad County, East Azerbaijan Province, Iran. At the 2006 census, its population was 276, in 68 families.
