= Harib Al Qaramish district =

Coordinates: 15°25′N 44°55′E

Harib Al Qaramish District
- District
- Interactive map of Harib Al Qaramish District
- Country: Yemen
- Governorate: Ma'rib

Population (2003)
  - Total: 8,573
- Time zone: UTC+3 (Yemen Standard Time)

Harib Al Qaramish District (Arabic: مديرية حريب القرامش) is a district of the Ma'rib Governorate, Yemen. As of 2003, the district had a population of 8,573 inhabitants.
