= Harib (name) =

Masculine Arabic given name

Harib (also spelled Hareeb) (Arabic: حارب) is an Arabic masculine given name meaning "war". It's particularly common in the United Arab Emirates (UAE), Oman, Yemen, and Saudi Arabia. It's occasionally used in North Africa, typically in countries like Egypt and throughout the Levant region. The variant Hareeb is most commonly found in Afghanistan and Pakistan in families with Arabic or Iranic heritage.

== Meaning ==
The name Harib (and Hareeb) are rooted in the Arabic word harb (war), and it typically translates to "warrior", "fighter" or "one who engages in war".

Islamic scholors and Prophet Muhammad discourage names with such harsh or unpleasant meanings. Because the name does not glorify anything or anyone against Allah (and does not promote sin or immorality), a person bearing this name does not bear any sin but is legally advised to change their name. The name Harib/Hareeb is not strictly forbidden (haram) to use in Islam, but it is generally discouraged (makruh).
