= Hurab =

Hurab حوراب
- Village
- Location within Iran
- Coordinates: 28°19′18″N 56°51′58″E
- Country: Iran
- Province: Kerman
- County: Kahnuj
- Bakhsh: Central
- Rural District: Howmeh

Population (2006)
  - Total: 97
- Time zone: UTC+3:30 (IRST)
  - Summer (DST): UTC+4:30 (IRDT)

Hurab (Persian: حوراب, also Romanized as Ḩūrāb) is a village in Howmeh Rural District, in the Central District of Kahnuj County, Kerman Province, Iran. At the 2006 census, its population was 97, in 23 families.
