= Tariq Saleh =

Brazilian journalist (born 1974)

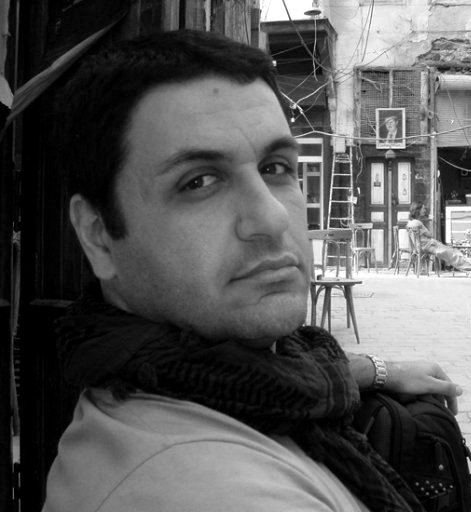
- Born: September 16, 1974 (age 51); Beirut, Lebanon
- Occupation: Journalist

Tariq Saleh (Beirut, 16 September 1974) is a Brazilian journalist, international correspondent and TV producer, best known for his coverage on international news and current affairs as a Beirut-based journalist for over 15 years. His coverage of the Middle East and North Africa for the BBC World Service and later TV3 (Catalonia) was focused mainly in documenting on politics, wars, human rights and refugees. He is currently a contributor to Radio France International.

His work as a producer and writer includes TIME magazine, Die Zeit newspaper, leading broadcaster Rede Globo, TV Record, Terra Networks, Veja Online and leading daily Folha de S.Paulo. He also worked as deputy editor in chief at Transterra Media agency. Since 2013, he is involved in training other journalists in basic Hostile Environment and First Aid (HEFAT) courses in Brazil and the Middle East.

Since 2006, he covered many major events in the region as the Battle of Mosul, the Syrian Civil War, Turkish constitutional referendum, 2017, the 2011 Egyptian Revolution, the Libyan Civil War, the 2011 Syrian uprising, the Arab Spring, the Gaza War (2008–09), the 2009 Iranian presidential election and the political and humanitarian crises in Lebanon.

== Biography ==
Tariq Saleh was born in Beirut during the period his parents were working in Lebanon. He was raised in Sapiranga, a small town in the southern state of Rio Grande do Sul in Brazil, where his Palestinian grandfather immigrated to in the late 1950s.

Fluent in English, Arabic and Spanish, he graduated with a BA in journalism at Universidade do Vale do Rio dos Sinos (Unisinos), a university in southern Brazil. Between 1992 and 1993, he lived in the United Kingdom, returning to Brazil to finish his studies. In 2006 he moved to the Middle East to cover the region.

== Career ==
Passion for journalism started at the age of 14 years but he studied civil engineering instead. However, after studying photography he joined the journalism school at Unisinos university and his interests soon became politics, conflicts, human rights and social issues in the Middle East, Africa and Latin America.

He started as a reporter and photographer at his university news agency. A year later, his obsession for international coverage led him to become a world affairs reporter in the Brazilian newspaper Zero Hora of Porto Alegre, helping in the coverage of the Iraq War in 2003.

Tariq Saleh moved to Lebanon in 2006 to cover the political turmoil in the country following the war between Hezbollah and Israel. In Beirut, he worked as a freelancer covering the political crisis in Lebanon. He joined the BBC in 2007 as a correspondent in Lebanon and later, in 2009, he became one of the broadcaster's Middle East correspondents.

His reports, photographs and audio bulletins for the BBC World Service, notably BBC Brazil, are published in many newspapers and websites, and broadcast on TV and radio stations in Brazil and elsewhere.

In 2017, Tariq Saleh and his colleagues Txell Feixas and Oriol Andrés Gallart were awarded the APPEC Journalism Award for their distinguished coverage of the Middle East as the Beirut-based team for Spanish channel TV3 Catalonia.
