= Al Abdiyah district =

Al Abdiyah district مديرية العبدية
- District
- Location in Yemen
- Coordinates: 14°39′N 45°21′E
- Country: Yemen
- Governorate: Ma'rib

Population (2003)
  - Total: 13,000
- Time zone: UTC+3 (Yemen Standard Time)

Al Abdiyah district (Arabic: مديرية العبدية) is a district of the Ma'rib Governorate, Yemen. As of 2003, the district had a population of 13,000 inhabitants.
