= Salem Ali Qatan =

Yemeni military officer

- سالم علي قطن
- Born: 1952; Yashbam, Upper Aulaqi Sheikhdom
- Died: 18 June 2012 (aged 59–60); Aden, Yemen
- Cause of death: Suicide bombing
- Military career
- Allegiance: Yemen
- Branch: Yemeni Land Forces
- Service years: 1970–2012
- Rank: Major General
- Unit: 31st Armoured Brigade
- Commands: Southern Military Region
- Conflicts: Al-Qaeda insurgency in Yemen; Battle of Zinjibar (2011–2012); Battle of Lawdar (2012); 2012 Abyan offensive X

Major General Salem Ali Qatan (Arabic: سالم علي قطن; 1952 – 18 June 2012) was a Yemeni military officer and member of the Al-Awaliq tribe. He was born in Yashbem in . He was married, and joined the military in 1970. As the chief military commander in south Yemen, Qatan had led a month-long offensive against terrorist organization al-Qaeda, leading to its withdrawal from several towns and villages in the Abyan and Shabwa provinces of Yemen which it had controlled since 2011. Ali Qatan was appointed in March 2012, succeeding Major General Mahdi Maqouleh just days after the newly elected President of Yemen, Abdrabuh Mansur Hadi took office and pledged to destroy al-Qaeda in the Arabian Peninsula once and for all.

== Life and career ==
Qatan was born in Yashbam, a village in As Said district of Shabwah Governorate then part of the Upper Aulaqi Sheikhdom, in 1952. He received primary education in his home town before joining the military of South Yemen in 1970. Holding a degree in joint forces command, he quickly rose through the ranks of the South Yemen army, being appointed the commander of an infantry platoon at a Yemeni Military College before eventually being named the deputy commander for a Yemeni peacekeeping unit sent to Lebanon in 1977 as part of the Arab Deterrent Force. From thereon, he occupied several positions throughout the military of unified Yemen, such as commanding of the 115th Infantry Brigade, the Central Military Region, and an army axis, before being appointed the deputy chief of staff for human resources from 2002 to 2012.

=== Southern region commander ===
On 20 April 2012, Qatan suspended a military officer who was suspected to have smuggled 410 artillery shells from the military region's armory to Ansar al-Sharia.

== Death ==
=== Assassination ===
On 18 June 2012, Qatan was killed in the port city of Aden by a suicide bomber. According to a report by Chinese news agency Xinhua, Yemeni militants had assassinated Qatan in response to the army offensive in the south of Yemen. A spokesperson for the Yemeni militants told the news agency, "One of our jihadists succeeded in assassinating Gen Salem Ali Qatan who had led a month-long offensive against our families and strongholds in Abyan." In an interview with Agence France-Presse, an anonymous medical officer for Qatan, mentioned that the attacker "handed Qatan a piece of paper, shook his hand and then detonated himself" as the general was on his way to his office. According to witnesses, the assassin was wearing an explosives belt.

The Defence Ministry of Yemen said a suicide bomber had hurled himself towards Qatan's car, and that two soldiers escorting him were killed too in the process. It identified the suicide bomber as a Somali but disclosed no other details. A doctor at the hospital where Qatan died said 12 other people, 9 of them being soldiers, were seriously wounded.

=== Response ===
Ali Mansur, a veteran army commander and close aide to Qatan, described the general's death as "a huge loss for Yemen". Speaking to Agence France-Presse via telephone, he gave Qatan one hundred percent credit for the recent victories in the battles against the insurgents. Said Mansur, "In just three months, Qatan achieved major progress towards chasing down and eliminating" the fighters from their strongholds."

== Funeral ==
Qatan was given a state funeral in Sanaa, Yemen, on 20 June 2012, where hundreds of people gathered.
