= Mahliyah district =

Coordinates: 14°40′N 45°15′E

Mahliyah District
- District
- Interactive map of Mahliyah District
- Country: Yemen
- Governorate: Ma'rib

Population (2003)
  - Total: 9,156
- Time zone: UTC+3 (Yemen Standard Time)

Mahliyah District is a district of the Ma'rib Governorate, Yemen. As of 2003, the district had a population of 9,156 inhabitants.
