= Medghal district =

Coordinates: 15°35′N 45°00′E

Medghal District
- District
- Interactive map of Medghal District
- Country: Yemen
- Governorate: Marib

Population (2003)
  - Total: 10,654
- Time zone: UTC+3 (Yemen Standard Time)

Medghal District is a district of the Marib Governorate, Yemen. As of 2003, the district had a population of 10,654 inhabitants.
