= Harib district =

Coordinates: 15°00′N 45°20′E

Harib District مديرية حريب Hareeb District
- District
- Interactive map of Harib District
- Country: Yemen
- Governorate: Ma'rib

Population (2003)
  - Total: 33,663
- Time zone: UTC+3 (Yemen Standard Time)

Harib District (Arabic: مديرية حريب) is a district of the Ma'rib Governorate, Yemen. As of 2003, the district had a population of 33,663 inhabitants.
