= Sirwah district =

Coordinates: 15°25′N 45°20′E

Sirwah District مُدِيْرِيَّة صِرواح
- District
- Interactive map of Sirwah District
- Country: Yemen
- Governorate: Ma'rib

Population (2003)
  - Total: 19,939
- Time zone: UTC+3 (Yemen Standard Time)

Sirwah District (Arabic: مُدِيْرِيَّة صِرواح) is a district of the Ma'rib Governorate, Yemen. As of 2003, the district had a population of 19,939 inhabitants.
