= Marib =

Marib مَأْرِب
- City
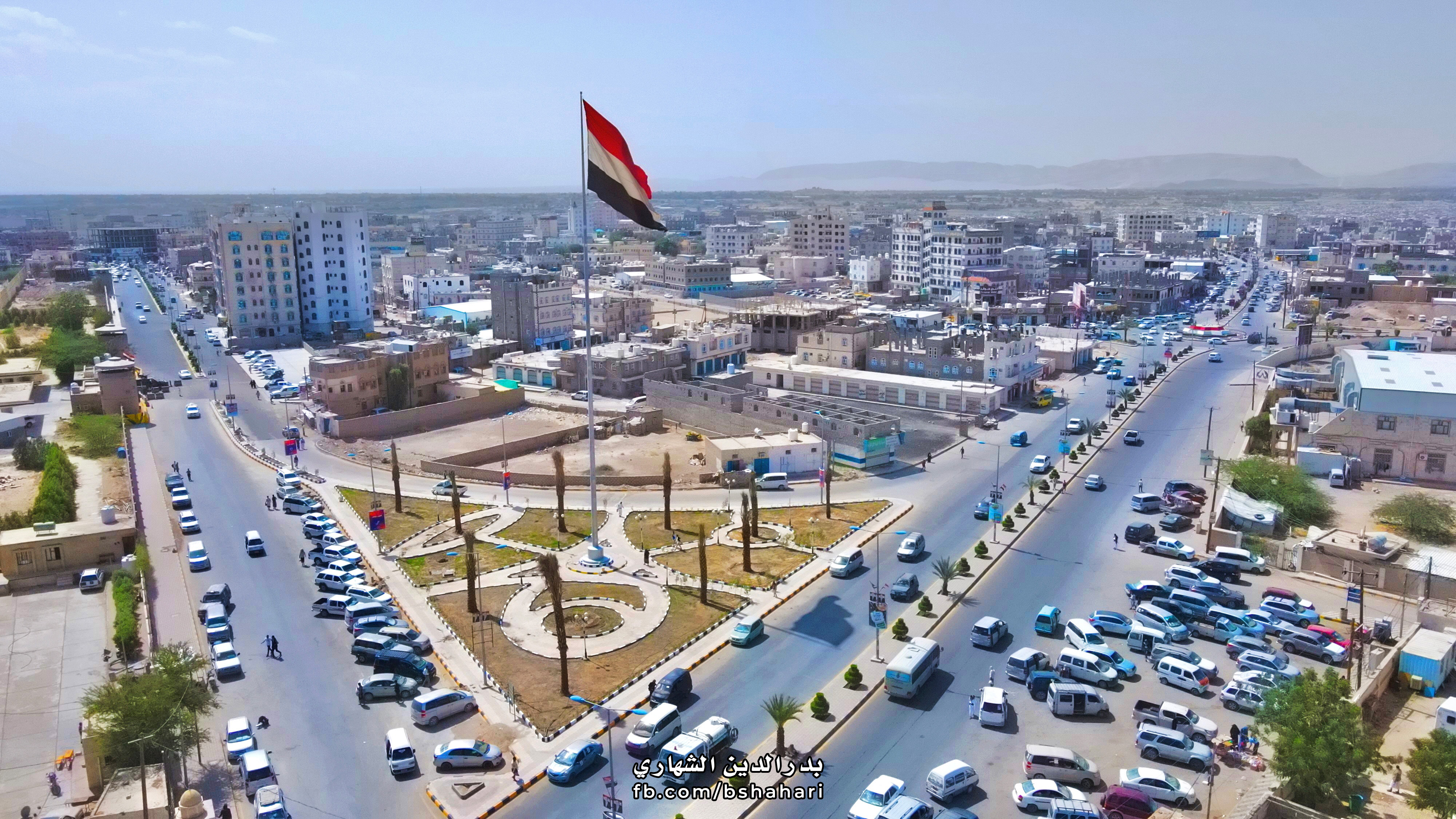
- Marib in 2021

- Location in Yemen
- Coordinates: 15°27′38″N 45°19′34″E
- Country: Yemen
- Governorate: Marib Governorate
- District: Marib
- Elevation: 3,670 ft (1,120 m)

Population (2005)
- 16,794
- Time zone: UTC+03:00 (Yemen Standard Time)

Marib (Arabic: مَأْرِب, romanized: Maʾrib; Old South Arabian: 𐩣𐩧𐩨/𐩣𐩧𐩺𐩨 Mryb/Mrb) is the capital city of Marib Governorate, Yemen. It was the capital of the ancient kingdom of Sabaʾ (Arabic: سَبَأ), which some scholars believe to be the ancient Sheba of biblical fame. It is about 120 kilometres (75 miles) east of Yemen's modern capital, Sanaa, and is in the region of the Sarawat Mountains. In 2005 it had a population of 16,794. However, in 2021, it had absorbed close to a million refugees fleeing the Yemeni Civil War.

The ancient city of Mirwah is one of the most important places for Arabian archaeology, and in 2023, was added by the UNESCO to its World Heritage Site List, as one of the Landmarks of the Ancient Kingdom of Saba, Marib.

== History ==
=== Ancient ===
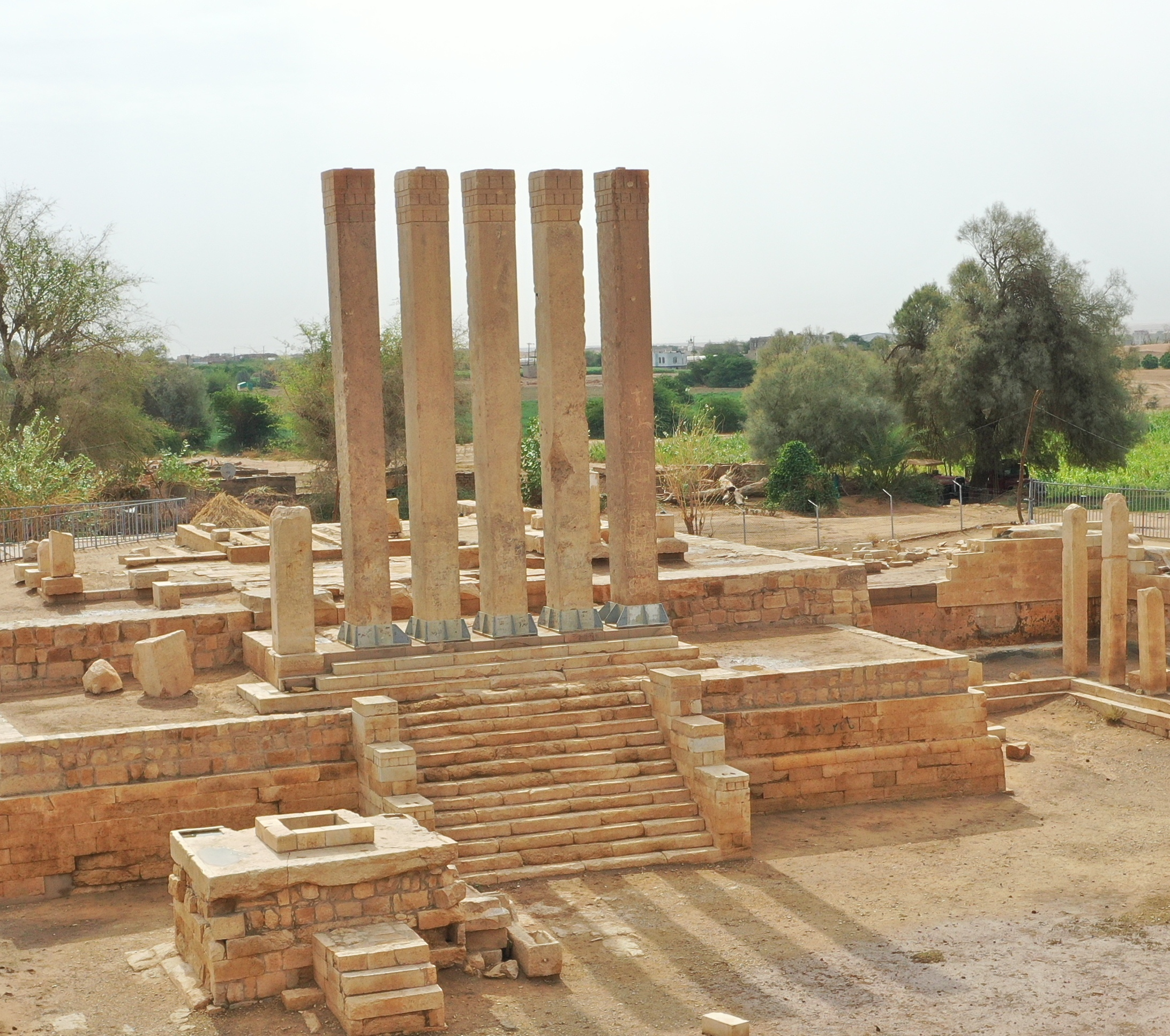
The Barran Temple, a relic of the Sabaean era

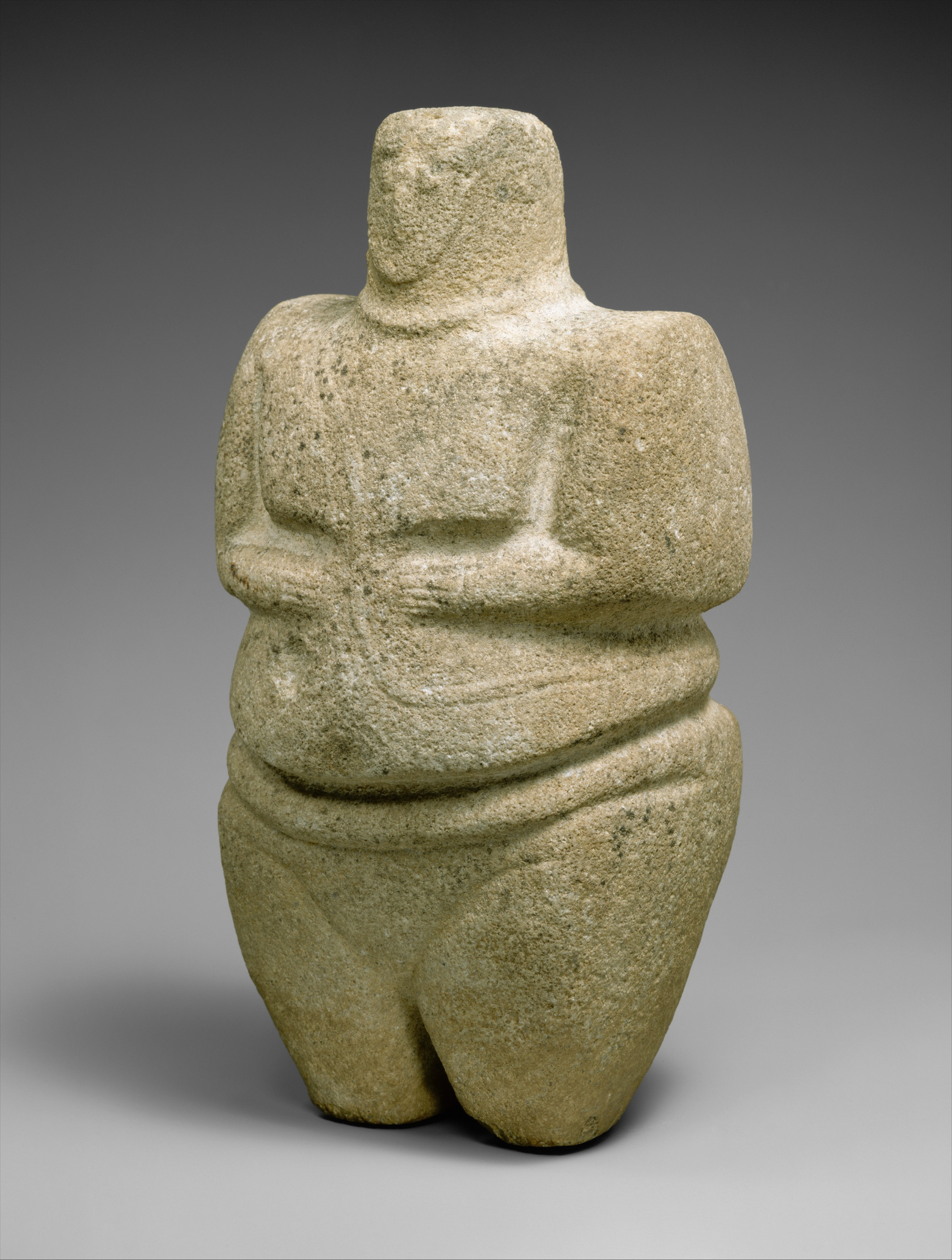
Stone-carved female figure wearing a strap and a necklace, 3rd–2nd millennium BC, sandstone, 27.5 x 14.3 x 14.3 cm, in the Metropolitan Museum of Art (New York City)

The Sabaean kingdom was based around Marib, with territory in northern Yemen. The Sabaean kings made their capital at Marib, and built great irrigation works such as the Marib Dam, whose ruins are still visible. The Marib Dam supported a flourishing culture for more than a thousand years. They also built castles and temples in the area, including, most notably the temples of Almaqah at Awwam and Barran. Saba was known for dealing in the lucrative frankincense and myrrh trade.

In 25 BC, Aelius Gallus of Rome led an expedition to Marib, laying siege to the city. He suffered major losses and was forced to retreat to Egypt.

=== 20th century ===
==== Old city ====
The site of ancient Marib was largely abandoned during the 20th century. Although a small village remains, the multi-story mud-brick buildings of the historic city are largely in ruins. The modern town of Marib is about 3.5 kilometres (2.2 miles) north of the center of the ancient city.

==== Modern Marib Dam ====
In 1982, floods ravaged the country. In response, the President of the U.A.E., Sheikh Zayed bin Sultan Al Nahyan, financed the construction of the current dam of Marib in 1984. The Sheikh himself was reportedly descended from people who migrated from the area of Marib to what is now the U.A.E.

=== Yemeni Civil War (2014–present) ===
During the Yemeni civil war, Marib and the surrounding Marib Governorate came under attack by the Houthis movement rebelling against the government of Abdrabbuh Mansour Hadi. The tribes of Marib repelled the Houthis with help from the Saudi Arabian-led intervention in Yemen.

According to the Abu Dhabi-based The National newspaper, "With 80 per cent of the province's population Sunni and only one of the five main tribes supportive of the Zaidi Shiite Houthis, tribal fighters managed to repel the attack. As a result, the Houthis control only about 20 per cent of Marib and the oil fields remained under Hadi's control. Many of the tribes in Marib, and in neighbouring al-Jawf and Shabwa provinces, are loyal to Al-Islah Party. According to two tribal chiefs, there are 8,000 Yemeni forces and tribal fighters based in Marib united against the Houthis. Some are directly loyal to President Hadi, others to Saudi Arabia, and a large number to the al-Islah Party, an Islamist group. The entire First Armoured Brigade, considered a military wing of al-Islah, based in Sanaa, was transferred to Marib in 2014 to defend the province. Other sections of Yemen's military remained loyal to Ali Abdullah Saleh, the former president overthrown by Arab Spring protests who has now sided with the Houthis against Hadi. After the Saudi-led coalition joined the war in March 2015 and drove the Houthis from most of Yemen's southern provinces in July 2015, the focus shifted to Marib, known as the gateway to Sana'a, where the strong support base made it a natural location for an attack in the north.

According to Al-Jazeera, by 7 April 2015, Houthi forces had been expelled from the majority of Marib Governorate by Saudi-backed tribesmen. The governor of Marib told Al-Jazeera that forces allied to President Abd-Rabbu Mansour Hadi and the Gulf coalition were "perusing the last pockets of Houthis" in the province.

The city of Marib is just 173 kilometres (107 miles) from the capital, and the province adjoins the predominantly Sunni provinces of Al Jawf, Al-Baydha and Shabwa, where the Houthis' control is unlikely to hold if attacked. In particular, Al-Jawf to the north would provide a route towards the Houthi's Saada stronghold. The coalition began moving supplies to Marib in March 2015, using land routes from Saudi Arabia through Hadramout and Shabwa provinces. In August 2015, coalition forces started flying more reinforcements to Marib using a small airport in the tiny town of Safer, 60 km east of Marib city. Loyalist military sources said further reinforcements including tanks, armoured vehicles, rocket launchers and Apache helicopters arrived August 2015. The town serves as a base for the state-run Safer Exploration and Production Operations Company and other foreign companies working in Yemen's vital energy sector. The main gas pipeline south also runs through the town, which is controlled by the pro-Hadi military commander Abdullah Al-Shaddadi. The nearest Houthi presence was in Baihan in Shabwa province, 50 kilometres (31 miles) away."

On 4 September 2015, 52 Emirati, ten Saudi, five Bahraini servicemen of the Arab coalition and scores of pro-Hadi Yemeni soldiers were killed by a Houthi ballistic missile attack against a military base in Safer, Marib.

More than 100 Yemeni government soldiers were killed in a drone and missile attack on a military camp near Marib on 18 January 2020, leaving over a hundred more soldiers injured and killing at least 5 civilians. The Houthis were suspected and accused of carrying out the attack, although they denied responsibility.

Five foreign mine clearance experts were killed in an explosion inside the Saudi Project for Landmine Clearance MASAM on 20 January 2019. One of the experts was a resident of South Africa of British descent. Other members of the team were from Colombia and unspecified countries in Africa.

On 27 May 2020, a Houthi missile attack targeted the headquarters of the army command of the Saudi-backed government in Marib Governorate killing eight soldiers including the Chief of Staff of the Republic of Yemen Armed Forces, Lt. Gen. Sagheer bin Aziz's son and nephew.

On 22 February 2021, the Houthis launched an offensive on Marib Governorate in late February with the aim of capturing Marib city. After making steady advances in the governorate, the Houthis launched a three direction assault on the city with occasional ballistic strikes. According to the International Organization for Migration (IOM), over 140,000 displaced refugees from western Marib fled fearing the Houthis' advance.

On 30 November 2021, Marib was described as "the city at the heart of Yemen's dirty war" by the BBC News. It has absorbed close to a million refugees fleeing the war in other parts of Yemen.

== Oil refinery ==
The Yemen Oil Refining Company opened a refinery in Marib in 1986, which produces 10,000 barrels (1,600 m^{3}) of oil per day (2009). In November 2009, the company announced an agreement with Korea's Shinhan to expand and upgrade the refinery to produce 25,000 barrels (4,000 m^{3})/day.

Marib is the start of the Marib-Ra's Isa oil pipeline (438 km (272 mi)), with a capacity of 200,000 barrels (32,000 m^{3}) per day. In addition, oil derivatives markets have witnessed relative stability in Marib, as fuel products are produced and refined locally and cover local needs in the governorate. This stands in sharp contrast to other areas around Yemen which at times suffer from a shortage of oil derivatives and wild price fluctuations. In Marib, petrol and cooking gas are almost always available at official prices, while gas tankers leave the governorate to the capital Sana’a and other governorates on a daily basis.

== Climate ==
Marib has a hot desert climate (Köppen climate classification: BWh).

Climate data for Marib
| Month | Jan | Feb | Mar | Apr | May | Jun | Jul | Aug | Sep | Oct | Nov | Dec | Year |
|---|---|---|---|---|---|---|---|---|---|---|---|---|---|
| Mean daily maximum °C (°F) | 25.5 (77.9) | 26.4 (79.5) | 28.3 (82.9) | 29.9 (85.8) | 31.7 (89.1) | 33.3 (91.9) | 32.5 (90.5) | 31.8 (89.2) | 30.7 (87.3) | 28.6 (83.5) | 25.5 (77.9) | 26.3 (79.3) | 29.2 (84.6) |
| Daily mean °C (°F) | 18.0 (64.4) | 18.8 (65.8) | 21.4 (70.5) | 23.0 (73.4) | 25.0 (77.0) | 26.1 (79.0) | 26.3 (79.3) | 25.6 (78.1) | 24.5 (76.1) | 21.4 (70.5) | 18.4 (65.1) | 18.6 (65.5) | 22.3 (72.1) |
| Mean daily minimum °C (°F) | 10.6 (51.1) | 11.2 (52.2) | 14.5 (58.1) | 16.1 (61.0) | 18.4 (65.1) | 18.9 (66.0) | 20.2 (68.4) | 19.4 (66.9) | 18.3 (64.9) | 14.3 (57.7) | 11.4 (52.5) | 11.0 (51.8) | 15.4 (59.6) |
| Average precipitation mm (inches) | 4 (0.2) | 1 (0.0) | 4 (0.2) | 12 (0.5) | 19 (0.7) | 1 (0.0) | 21 (0.8) | 31 (1.2) | 8 (0.3) | 1 (0.0) | 2 (0.1) | 3 (0.1) | 107 (4.1) |
Source: Climate-Data.org

== See also ==
- Haram
- Kaminahu
- Nashaq
- Nashshan
- Shabwah
- Shibam
