= Marib Governorate =

Governorate of Yemen

Marib Governorate محافظات مَأْرِب
- Governorate
- Country: Yemen
- Region: Sheba Region
- Seat: Marib

Government
  - Governor: Maj. Sultan Al-Aradah

Area
  - Total: 20,023 km^{2} (7,731 sq mi)

Population (2011)
  - Total: 488,000
  - Density: 24.4/km^{2} (63.1/sq mi)
- Website: www.marib-gov.com

Marib (Arabic: مَأْرِب, romanized: Maʾrib) is a governorate of Yemen. It is located 173 kilometers to the northeast of Yemen's capital, Sanaa. The population of Marib Governorate comprises 1.2% of the country's total population. The city of Marib is the capital of the governorate, and was established after the discovery of oil deposits in 1984. The total number of residents living in the governorate was 238,522, according to the 2004 census, and the rate of growth was 2.72%.

As of 28 April 2020, it is the only governorate of the former North Yemen controlled by the internationally recognized Government of Yemen.

== Geography ==
Marib Governorate's area is approximately 17,405 square kilometres (6,720 square miles).

=== Climate ===
The governorate's climate varies based on elevation. The mountainous and elevated regions, which make up the western half of the governorate, are dominated by a moderate climate with hot summers and relatively cold winters. In the low-lying and plain regions, the climate is hot in the summers and moderate in the winters. The desert regions are characterized by a dry climate: hot in the summers, and cold and dry in the winters.

Summer rains fall on most parts of the governorate, but the amount of rainfall is usually small, especially in the eastern parts. Most parts of Marib Governorate suffer from drought, given the sparse rainfall.

=== Adjacent governorates ===
Governorates of Yemen

- Al Jawf Governorate (north)
- Al-Bayda Governorate (south)
- Shabwah Governorate (southeast)
- Hadhramaut Governorate (east)
- Sanaa Governorate (west).

=== Districts ===
Marib Governorate is divided into the following 14 districts, with Marib District the largest by area:

- Al Abdiyah district
- Al Jubah district
- Bidbadah district
- Harib district
- Harib Al Qaramish district
- Jabal Murad district
- Mahliyah district
- Majzar district
- Marib district
- Marib City district
- Medghal district
- Raghwan district
- Rahabah district
- Sirwah district

== Agriculture and economy ==
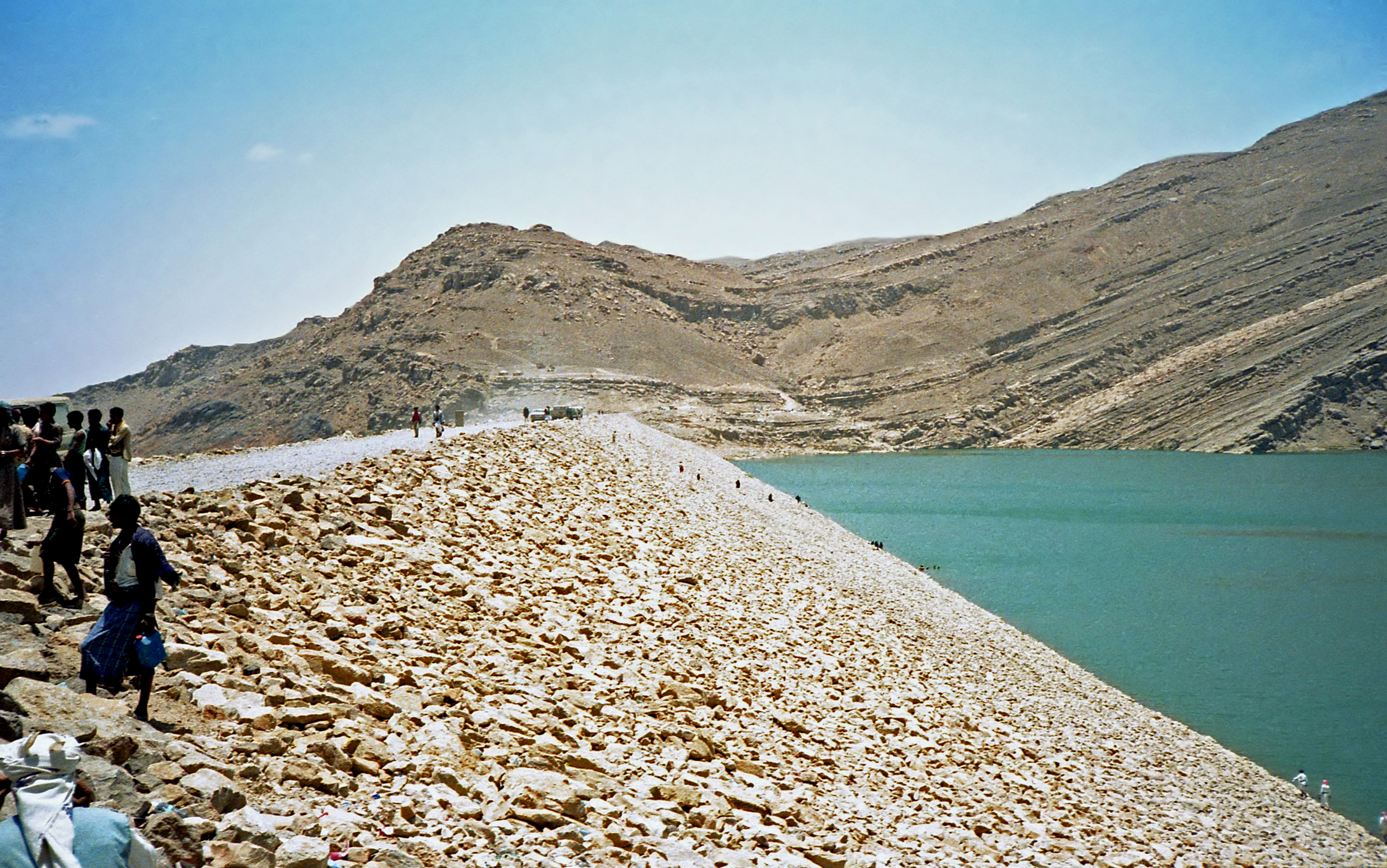
Marib Dam

In the 1980s, after the region was hit by floods, a dam was constructed in Maʼrib, which would later be deemed to be important for the country's agriculture and economy. Its construction was financed by Sheikh Zayed bin Sultan Al Nahyan of the United Arab Emirates, who himself was reportedly a descendant of people from this area.

The area is home to the largest gas-fired power plant in Yemen, the Maʼrib Gas Plant, whose electricity towers have been sabotaged continuously since the beginning of 2011. These sabotage operations did not stop until 2014, due to the inability of the Basindawa government to deter the saboteurs.

Agriculture is the main livelihood for the governorate's residents. Maʼrib Governorate ranks third in Yemen behind Al Hudaydah Governorate and Sanaa Governorate in terms of agricultural production, making up 7.6% of the country's total agricultural production. Its most important agricultural products are fruits, grains, and vegetables. Many types of livestock are found in the governorate, including cattle, camels, sheep, goats, donkeys, and poultry. There are also quite a number of beehives. According to statistics for 2007-11, the governorate was home to approximately 1,943,564 sheep, 1,669,370 goats, 42,000 cattle, and 112,782 camels, making up 3.8% of Yemen's total livestock.

== Flora and fauna ==
Vegetation in the governorate is diverse, despite its sparseness and lack of density in terms of quantity and quality from place to place, depending on the nature of the surface and prevailing climate. The most important trees are the Christ's thorn jujube, qard tree, buckthorn, acacia (particularly or including the umbrella thorn acacia, as well as other thorny trees. There are also many types of grasses and small plants that grow in the rainy seasons.

Many types of wild animals are present in the governorate, and are plentiful in the western areas, including hyenas, snakes, wild rabbits, hedgehogs, and hyraxes. Birds include falcons, pigeons, eagles, and owls. The birds are numerous in areas dense with trees, as well as near wadis, especially those with water. The presence of the nimr (Arabic: نِـمْـر, leopard) was reported in the Sarawat Mountains.

== See also ==
- Middle East
- Sabaeans
- South Arabia
- Muhammad Abd al-Karim al-Ghamari
