= Radda, al-Bayda =

Rada'a
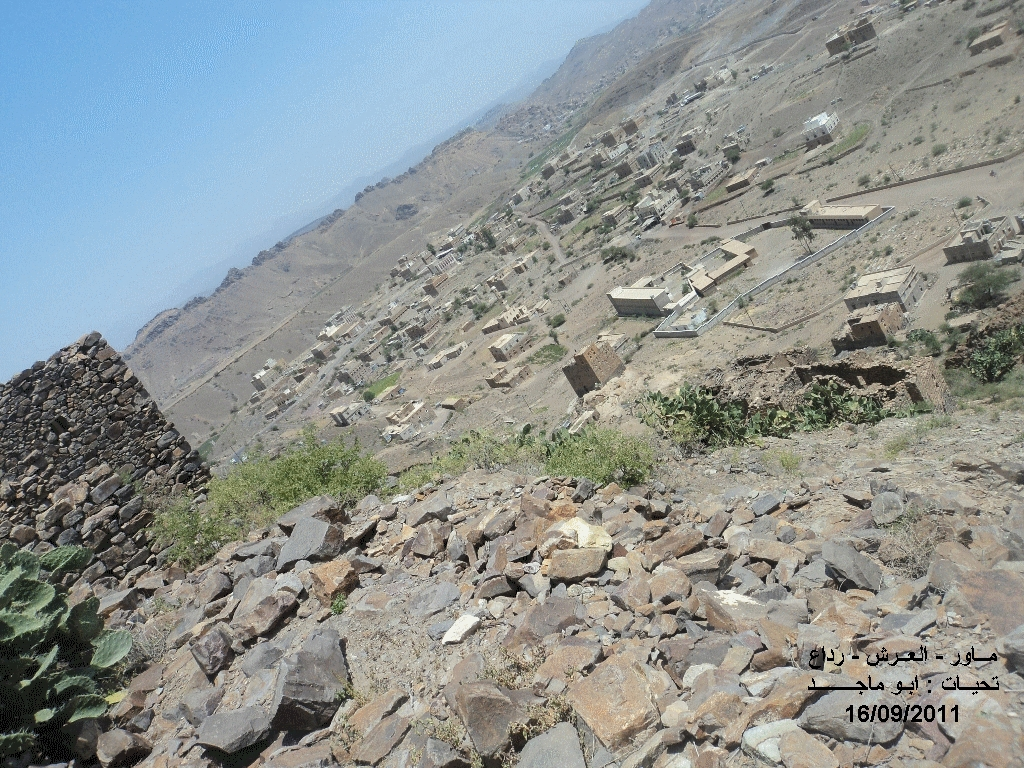

- Location within Yemen
- Coordinates: 14°24′52″N 44°50′25″E
- Country: Yemen
- Governorate: Al Bayda Governorate
- District: Radda district

Population
  - Total: 57,215
- Time zone: UTC+3
- Area code: 06
- Geocode: 71491

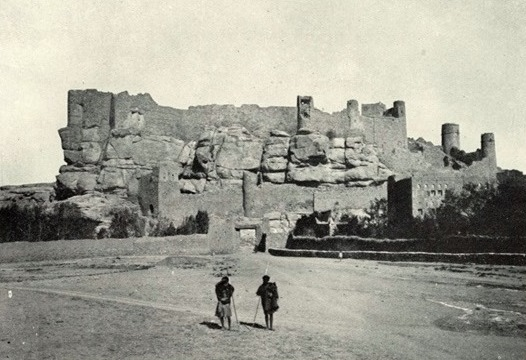

Rada'a (Arabic: رداع) is a sub-district located in Radda district, Al Bayda Governorate, Yemen. Rada'a had a population of 54,714 according to the 2004 census.

== Rada'a city ==
Rada'a is one of the cities of the Republic of Yemen. It is situated in the southeastern region of the capital city of Sana'a, approximately 150 kilometers away from it, at an elevation of approximately 2100 meters above sea level. Geographically, Rada'a belongs to the Al-Bayda governorate. It is situated within the administrative boundaries of the Rada'a district. The 2004 census recorded the population of the area as 57,215.

It is one of the ancient Yemeni cities referenced in the Victory Inscription (RES.3945), an inscription written by the Sabean king "Karb-el-Watr", also known as the Makrab of Sheba, in the seventh century BCE. It is postulated that the Himyarite monarch, "Shamar Yahrash", resided in Rada'a, which may be indicative of the ancient origins of this settlement. Additionally, some writers have described it as a town with a favorable climate and an abundance of land, grapes, and fruits. It is situated in close proximity to several districts, including Anas to the north, Murad to the east, Al-Bayda and Yafi to the south, and Yarim and Ammar to the west. The lands of Rada'a are watered from the Ghayl al-Dawla and Ghayl al-Majri, and their water flows to two sides. The western valleys, fed by the water from the aforementioned sources, flow into Wadi Bina and Yarim and then run to Abyan, eventually pouring into the sea. In a parallel course, the water from Rada'a, Thah, Al-Arash, Al-Sawadiyah and Radman, also fed by the Ghayl al-Dawla and Ghayl al-Majri, flows into Wadi Adnah and ultimately into Marib.

== Geographical history ==
Rada'a constituted a vast region during the Islamic and Ottoman periods, encompassing numerous makhāllifāt, including:

- Makhlaf Bani Amer (Sabah District).
- Makhlaf al-Rayashiya (Ar Ryashyyah district).
- Makhlaf Al-Arash (Al A'rsh district).
- Makhlaf Qaifa (Wald Rabi' district).
- Makhlaf Radman.
- Makhlaf al-Habishiya (currently Damt district in Dhale Governorate).

The district of Rada'a constituted approximately half of the total area of Al-Bayda Governorate. In 1357, Imam Yahya Muhammad Hamid ed-Din removed the Makhlaf al-Habishiya and some Makhlaf al-Rayashiya from the Rada'a district and established a new district with its center in Damt. This new district was formed by adding Azal and Al-Bakra from Makhlaf Ammar, Mankir and Kanah from Makhlaf al-Aud, and incorporating them into the Ibb Brigade (now Ibb Governorate). Subsequently, under Imam Ahmad's leadership, Al-Bayda was designated as the brigade center following its incorporation with the two districts of Rada'a (Jibn and Sawadiyah).

Following the unification of Yemen and the subsequent establishment of a republican government in 1998, Rada'a became one of the eleven districts of Al-Bayda Governorate. Subsequently, Rada'a district was subdivided into seven districts, as outlined below:

- Rada'a district
- Al Quraishyah district
- Ash Sharyah district
- Wald Rabi' district
- Al A'rsh district
- Sabah district
- Ar Ryashyyah district

== Mountains ==
- Barash Mountain is situated to the south of the city of Rada'a and features a ruin and a series of ancient forts.
- Sabah Mountain is situated to the west of Rada'a City and constitutes an ancient archaeological site.
- Ahrem Mountain.

The city of Rada'a was fortified by a wall with four historic gates, of which only two remain today. The southern gate of Maqleh, which still preserves the beginning of the city wall, and the northwestern gate are the only two extant examples. The structure known as Bab al-Mahjari is located in the center of the public road. The structure currently exists as a single entity at the center of the public thoroughfare. The eastern gate, Bab al-Souq, was razed to facilitate the widening of the thoroughfare, while the northeastern gate, Bab al-Thajra, has been reduced to an earthen mound that serves to indicate the original location of the gate.

== Archaeological sites ==
Rada'a is home to a multitude of archaeological and historical sites, including: Notable among these are the Islamic schools, Rada'a Castle, and other monuments.

- Amiriya Madrasa: It is one of the most significant educational institutions in Yemen and a prominent example of Islamic art, representing a pinnacle of architectural achievement during the Tahirid era. Constructed by King Al-Zafir Salah al-Din "Amer bin Abdul Wahhab bin Daoud bin Tahir" in the spring of the first year (910 AH) – September (1504 AD), as documented in historical records, the school is regarded as a masterpiece of the Tahirid state. He was the fourth king of the Bani Tahir family to succeed the Apostles in Yemen during the early years of the sixteenth century AD. "Amer bin Abdul Wahhab" ruled until his death in 923 AH (1517 AD), succeeding his father, King Al-Mansur "Abdul Wahhab bin Dawood bin Tahir," who died in 894 AH (1489 AD). The Dutch were responsible for restoring and maintaining the building.
- The Al-Ba'adaniyah Mosque and School Only a portion of one of the original walls remains intact. It is the oldest known educational institution in Rada'a. The edifice was constructed during the tenure of the Bani Rasul state. The order to build the school was transferred to the Amiriya School and affixed above its southern entrance. The inscription, which is engraved on wood, provides the name of the founder and the date of construction. It reads, "Jamal al-Din Muhammad bin Isa al-Baadani," who ordered the construction of this school in the month of Rajab in the year 899 AH (May 1494 AD).
- The Baghdadia Mosque and School It is one of the most ancient Islamic mosques and schools, with a history that can be traced back to the era of the Tahirid state. It is believed that the wife of King Amer bin Abdul Wahhab constructed the mosque and school, which were named Baghdadia in her honor. These structures were erected during the same period as the Amiriya school and employed a similar method of construction and decoration, utilizing sheets and interior stucco.
- The Al-Awsaja Mosque is a notable Islamic place of worship. This mosque was constructed in the eleventh century AH and underwent an expansion on the western side at the hands of Imam al-Mahdi "Muhammad bin Ahmad". It houses the most significant historical manuscripts.
- The Idris Mosque is situated in the northern part of the city. It has a square shape and a dome of significant historical importance, the decorations of which have been largely preserved in the northwestern section of the chapel. Subsequently, an annex was constructed on the eastern side of the mosque.
- Radaa Castle is a historic military stronghold that was constructed during the reign of King Sammar Yahrash and subsequently renovated during the rule of Amer bin Abdul Wahhab. It is regarded as one of the most significant archaeological and historical sites in Yemen.
- The city of Reyam is located in the Rada'a region of Yemen. The term "Reyam" is derived from the Arabic word for "high places." One such location is Reyam Mountain, situated in the Arhab district, north of the Yemeni capital, Sana'a. This mountain peak is home to the ancient city of Reyam, which served as a hub for the region's ancient states. Its strategic location, situated atop Reyam Mountain, the largest mountain in the Rada'a region, contributed to its prominence. The mountain is situated in a region of rich agricultural land, which saw the construction of a fortress and subsequent use as a military site to protect the city. In addition to the ruins that remain, there are also ancient Mesendian inscriptions that have been preserved on the stones. However, some of these stones have been reused in the construction of modern homes. Furthermore, there are indications of an old dam from the era of the Qutbani state.
- Mukul Sabah In his encyclopedic book, Al-Ikhlil, Part Eight, Al-Hamdani offers the following account of Mukul: Mukul is a country situated on a black mountain and encompassed by a black palace. To the right of this palace is a factory with palaces. Mukul is home to numerous ancient monuments and mounds adorned with carved stones and standing buildings. It also boasts a water cave carved in the rock, dating back to the Sabaean era, as well as the remnants of a vast wall that once encircled the city. Mukul was also a focal point for the Tahirid state, which ruled Yemen from 1453 to 1538 CE, and the incident between al-Mutahar bin Sharaf al-Din and Yahya al-Saraji occurred there in the tenth century AH.
- The Qurn al-Assad fortress is situated on the roof of a structure previously owned by Amer Ibn Abdul Wahab.
