= 2013 Radda airstrike =

U.S. airstrike on wedding convoy in Yemen

- Part of United States intervention in Yemen
- Location within Yemen
- Location: 14.55°N 44.85°E; Aqabat Zaj, Radda district, al-Bayda Governorate, Yemen
- Date: December 12, 2013 c. 4:30 p.m. (UTC+3)
- Target: Wedding procession convoy
- Attack type: Drone strike
- Weapon: 4 AGM-114 Hellfire missiles
- Deaths: 12 civilians
- Injuries: 15 civilians (6 seriously)
- Perpetrators: United States Armed Forces; Joint Special Operations Command

On December 12, 2013, a drone operated by the United States military division Joint Special Operations Command (JSOC) conducted an airstrike on a convoy of vehicles Aqabat Zaj, an area near Radda in al-Bayda Governorate, Yemen. The convoy was a wedding procession transporting the bride to the village of the groom. As it stopped for a vehicle with a flat tire, four missiles were launched at a Toyota Hilux carrying three people who escaped before the missiles landed. Four surrounding vehicles were additionally damaged.

The strike killed 12 men and injured 15 other people, six of them seriously. All were among the families of the bride and groom, and none were listed by local authorities as members of al-Qaeda in the Arabian Peninsula (AQAP), the purported target of the strike. The US claimed it conducted two internal investigations—one by the military and another by the federal government—both of which determined that no civilians had died. Later reports indicated internal doubts at the results, with the Central Intelligence Agency (CIA) believing the strike likely caused civilian casualties. American officials claimed their target was Shawqi Ali Ahmad al-Badani, ringleader of an AQAP plot to attack a US diplomatic mission earlier in August. He was believed to have escaped from the targeted vehicle. Witnesses and survivors rejected any linkage to him or AQAP, though some attested to another militant, Nasser al-Hotami, being present and escaping the vehicle.

The strikes prompted outrage in Yemen and criticism from the international community. The Yemeni government initially backed the US position on the strike but later apologized, and engaged in a tribal compensation process which allocated over $1 million to the families of the victims, a sum commentators believed was secretly provided by the US. Yemen's parliament passed a non-binding bill to ban drone strikes—the Barack Obama administration suspended JSOC activities in Yemen for the next year, but drone strikes continued through the parallel campaign operated by the CIA, while the restrictions on JSOC were lifted by 2015.

== Background ==
In a May 2013 speech, US President Barack Obama unveiled new policy regarding airstrikes conducted through unmanned aerial vehicles in countries including Yemen and Pakistan. He declared that responsibility for drone strikes would be gradually shifted from the Central Intelligence Agency (CIA) to Joint Special Operations Command (JSOC), a component of the US Armed Forces and the Department of Defense, in an effort to increase transparency regarding the program. Obama assured that drone strikes would only be launched "against terrorists who pose a continuing and imminent threat to the American people," and with "near certainty that no civilians will be killed or injured." Prior to the Radda strike, at least seven other instances of US airstrikes targeting weddings were recorded during the war on terror, although all were by piloted aircraft in Iraq or Afghanistan.

The CIA and JSOC both run parallel but separate drone campaigns in Yemen. Operations against al-Qaeda in the Arabian Peninsula (AQAP) and its local branch Ansar-al-Sharia increased substantially in 2012, but had declined in frequency the following year. The drone campaign had been facing increasing criticism among the local populace for frequent casualties involving civilians. Radda, which has been described as an AQAP stronghold, was the scene of a drone strike on September 2, 2012, which killed twelve civilians.

Yemeni officials suggested that the strike had come as a response to a high-profile attack on Yemen's Ministry of Defense compound in Sanaa earlier in December. AQAP claimed the attack, which killed 56 people, as a response to the killing of its leaders by US drones.

== Attack ==
Casualties
Killed
- Hussein Muhammad Saleh al-Amri, 37
- Muhammad Ali Mesad al-Amri, 34
- Ali Abdullah Muhammad al-Tisi, 36
- Zaidan Muhammad al-Amri, 34
- Shaif Abdullah Mohsen Mabkhut al-Amri, 22
- Hussein Muhammad al-Tomil al-Tisi, 65
- Motlaq Hamoud Muhammad al-Tisi, 41
- Saleh Abdullah Mabkhut al-Amri, 30
- Aref Ahmad Muhammad al-Tisi, 28
- Saleh Mesad Abdullah al-Amri, 30
- Mes`ad Dhaifallah Hussein al-Amri, 25
- Salem Muhammad Ali al-Tisi, 31

Seriously injured

- Abdullah Muhammad al-Tisi, 52, multiple shrapnel wounds
- Muhammad Ali Abdullah al-Amri, 45, multiple shrapnel wounds
- Naif Abdullah Ali al-Tisi, 30, lost vision in one eye, broken leg
- Muhammad Ali Ahmad al-Amri, 40, lost body parts including part of one leg
- Nasser Ali Ahmad al-Amri, 36, wounded in the back, leg
- Abdullah Aziz Mabkhot, 30, broken hand and leg

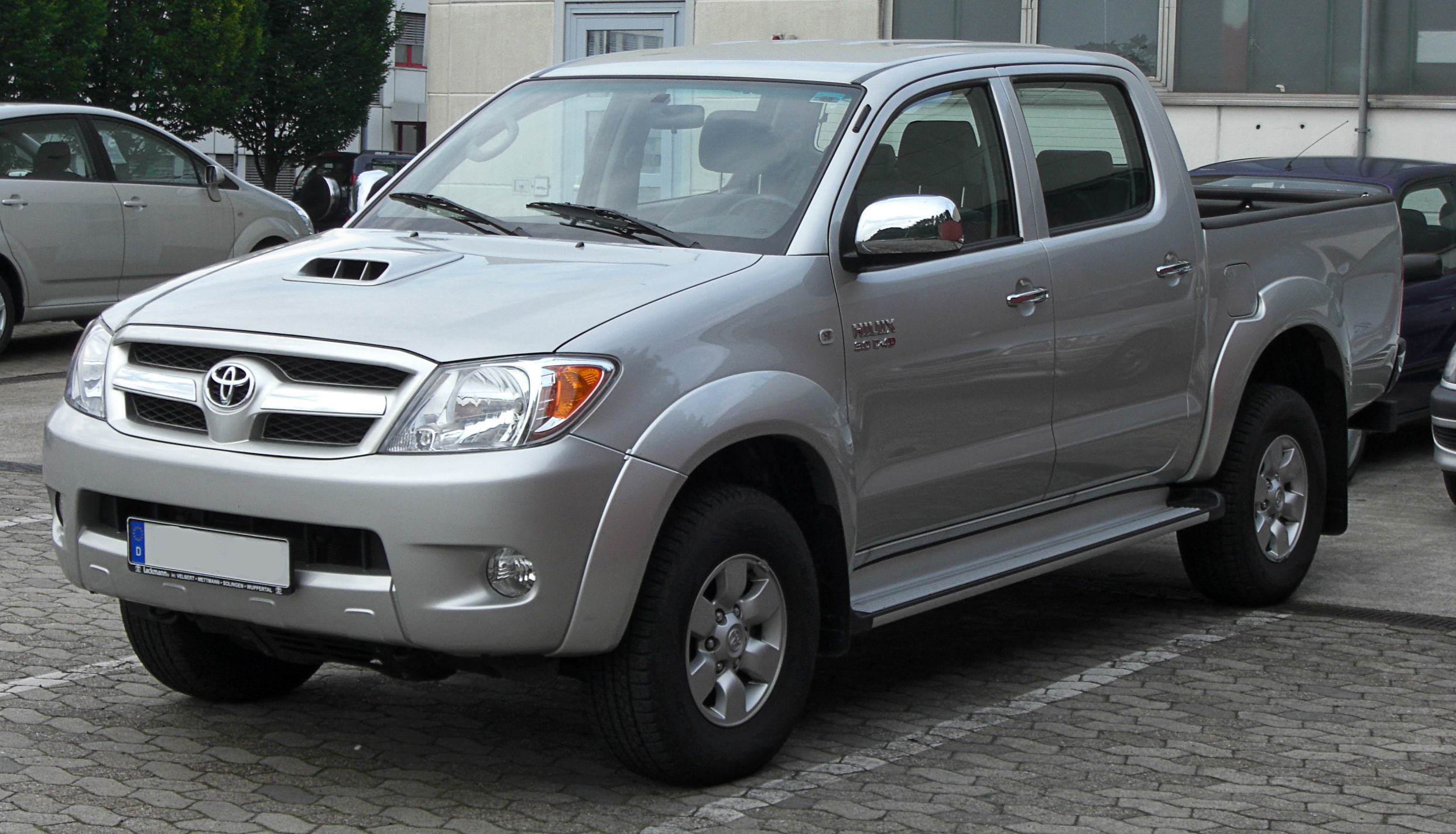
A 2005 Toyota Hilux, the type of truck targeted in the strike.

The strike targeted an 11-vehicle procession escorting a newlywed bride from a luncheon at her family's home in Jishm to al-Abusereema, the village of the groom. The convoy was composed of various SUV's and pickup trucks fitted with simple ceremonious ribbons and bows. Participating in the procession were 50 to 60 people, mainly adult men, several of whom wielding assault rifles as a common tribal tradition, and a small number of women from the al-Amri and al-Tisi families. The convoy was travelling through a remote, single-lane dirt road winding through the mountainous highlands of Radda district, at a pace of less than 10 miles per hour. Some of the passengers had heard a drone flying prior the strike, but ignored it as a common occurrence in the area.

The convoy eventually stopped halfway towards the destination at Aqabat Zaj, northeast of the city of Radda, as it waited for a car with a flat tire. The area was a wide open dip near a hillside— a local villager described it as "very remote" with "no way to run". Some procession goers soon noted that the sound of the drone, which was being operated by JSOC and was launched from a US base in Djibouti, had stopped as it was stalling at their location.

At approximately 4:30 p.m. local time, as the convoy was close together, an AGM-114 Hellfire missile struck the passenger side of a 2005 Toyota Hilux's roof, the fourth vehicle in the procession, seconds before its three occupants abandoned it. The drone fired three more Hellfire missiles within seconds which landed in the area surrounding the Hilux between the other vehicles, seemingly targeting its passengers in particular. The targeted vehicle proceeded to explode while being set ablaze. Shrapnel from the missiles were launched through the bodies and windshields of four vehicles close to the Hilux, while three were also lit on fire. According to a survivor, "Anyone who was still alive jumped out of their cars."

== Victims ==
The drone strike killed 12 men and wounded 15 other people. The victims were taken by other survivors to a hospital in Radda city via a 90-minute drive, 35-kilometers away from the location of the strike. Three died of their wounds in care while six others were treated for significant injuries including broken and missing eyes, genitals, arms and legs. Of the men killed, seven were from the al-Amri family while five were from the al-Tisi family, both sub-branches of the larger Qayfah tribe. The victims included shepherds, khat farmers, and illegal migrant workers in Saudi Arabia between the ages of 20 to 65. None of them were recorded as wanted AQAP members by the Yemeni government.

Four people were killed and three were injured in the first car in the convoy, a Toyota Land Cruiser, while its driver escaped unharmed. The driver of the third car, a former soldier in the Yemeni Army, was killed, being "tossed to the side" and "struck in his face, neck, and chest" according to his father, who was injured as part of the procession. A son of the groom was killed, while the bride, Warda al-Sorimi, sustained a minor shrapnel injury to her face, and had her wedding dress destroyed. None of those injured were questioned by government agents while in hospital care, as are most militants in similar situations.

== Investigation ==
Baraa Shiban, a local coordinator for human rights group Reprieve and a member of Yemen's National Dialogue Conference, interviewed local villagers and survivors of the strike two days afterwards. He sent his findings to NBC News, which published an investigative report into the incident on January 7, 2014. The report contained photography and video work by local activist Nasser al-Sane showing the victims being prepared for burial in Radda. After he sent his findings to the agency, Shiban said he received an anonymous phone message a day later threatening his life if he continued his investigation.

NBC News reported an investigation into the strike was being conducted by the US government. On February 20, anonymous officials stated that two investigations were carried out—one by a US Air Force general on the orders of Lieutenant General Joseph Votel, the commander of JSOC, and another by the National Counterterrorism Center on behalf of the Obama administration. Both investigations concluded that no civilians were killed and only AQAP targets were hit. According to Gregory D. Johnsen, the investigations were almost entirely based on JSOC strike footage and intelligence as investigators did not have the ability to visit the scene or interview survivors. He likened this to "trying to view the world through a soda straw", claiming that the investigations did not quell internal confusion over the results of the strike.

According a May 2014 report by the Los Angeles Times, a split had materialized between the CIA and JSOC in regards to the result of the strike. JSOC remained adamant that only AQAP militants were killed, meanwhile the CIA, and to an extent the National Counterterrorism Center, believed that some civilians were likely also killed. Prior to the strike, the CIA told JSOC that it "did not have confidence in the underlying intelligence" for the operation.

=== Target of the airstrike ===
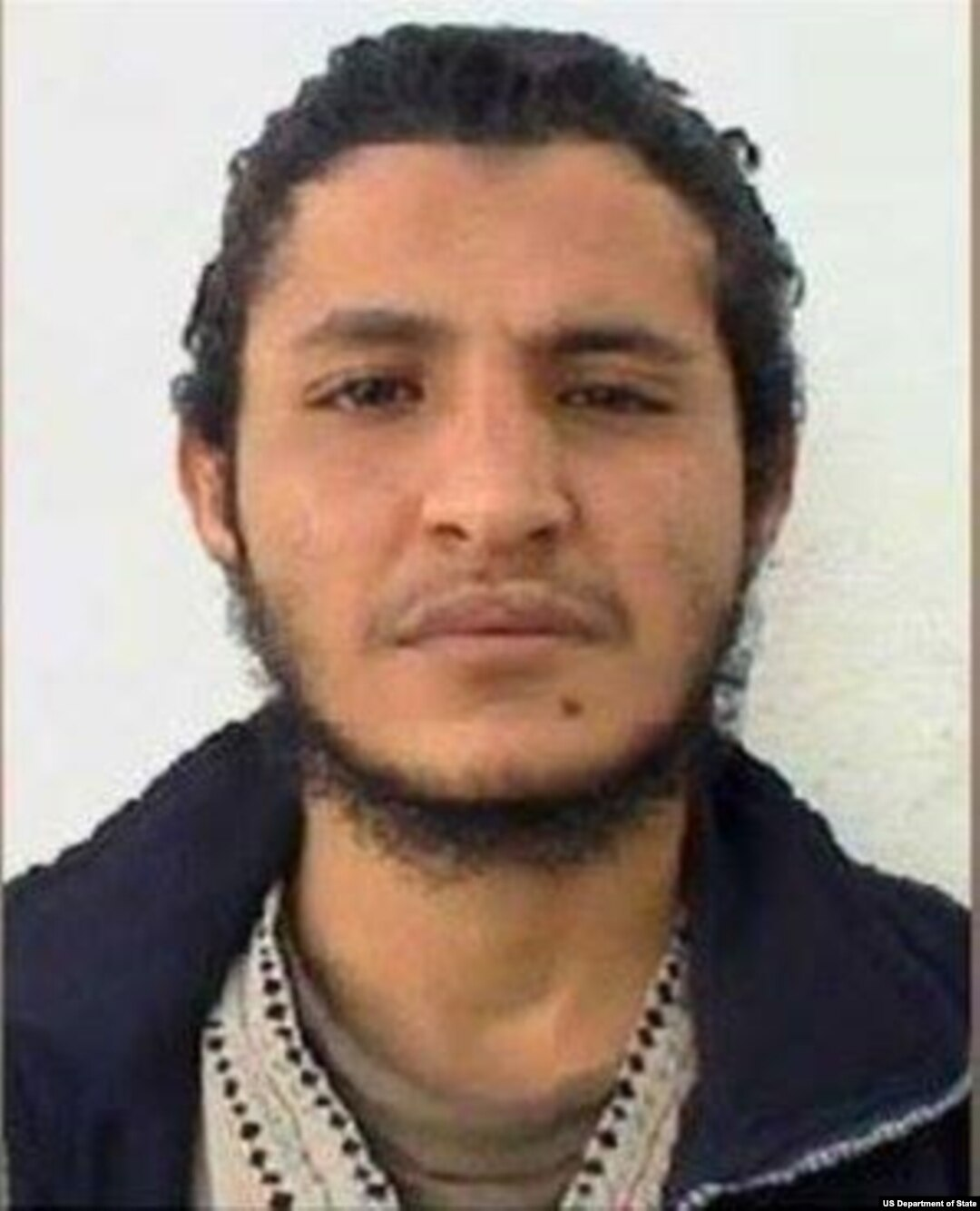
Photograph of Shawqi Ali Ahmad al-Badani, the alleged target of the attack.

A statement by Yemen's Supreme Security Committee said that the attack killed AQAP "members and leaders who masterminded armed forces, police, and vital institutions." On December 20, US and Yemeni officials told the Associated Press that the target of the attack was Shawqi Ali Ahmad al-Badani, a mid-level AQAP operational commander who was the mastermind of a major plot to attack an unspecified US embassy, which forced the closure of 19 diplomatic missions across the Middle East and North Africa in August of that year. An analyst from the Abaad Studies and Research Center said that Badani was being referred to on jihadist forums as an "emir [leader] of Sanaa", in the wake of the attack, but was effectively unheard of beforehand. Badani, who was listed as one of Yemen's most wanted militants several times, escaped the attack wounded according to the officials. By May 2014, US officials believed that he had escaped unharmed. He was added to the Specially Designated Global Terrorist list in July, and was killed by another drone strike in Radda on November 3, 2014.

Witnesses and relatives of the victims in the attack denied any relation to Badani or his presence in the convoy. Baraa Shiban reported no signs that Badani was in the vicinity of the attack. He said that, as a native of Ibb, it would have been improbable for Badani to be invited to a small tribal wedding celebration in a region he was foreign to. Shiban believed that perhaps the drone operators "saw a group of people waiting in trucks for a convoy and they assumed they were militants, so they made the decision to strike." The New York Times noted that the 11 vehicles comprising the procession was a noticeably larger number of vehicles than what AQAP usually uses in a convoy for clandestine traversal.

Some reports emerged of Nasser al-Hotami, an AQAP member from Radaa, being the actual target in the strike. Hotami was listed as a wanted militant in Yemen for involvement in a fatal attack on an army checkpoint and the Ansar al-Sharia takeover of Radda in January 2012, but was not connected to the US embassy plot led by Badani or any other attacks against the US. Human Rights Watch stated that Hotami was unheard of by their interviewed witnesses and wasn't in the procession, but Iona Craig of Al Jazeera America received contradictory accounts by witnesses and survivors, who said that he had escaped from the Toyota Hilux targeted in the procession with two others before the first missile landed. Hotami was later killed in a drone strike in Marib Governorate alongside another AQAP militant in April 2016.

== Aftermath ==
=== Response ===
The strike produced outrage across Yemen, further adding to local discontent over American airstrikes. The backlash AQAP faced from the Yemeni public the wake of the Ministry of Defense attack earlier in the month was effectively usurped by anger at the US. In Radda, protestors blocked the road connecting the city to Sanaa by the morning of 13 December as the bodies of those killed were displayed on the streets by their relatives. The protesters, mainly men from the Qayfah tribe, agreed to reopen the road by the next day as the government agreed to negotiate with the victims. Upon the agreement, the victims were taken for burial at their villages by dozens of tribesmen.

Hooria Mashhour, Yemen's Minister of Human Rights, condemned the strike and wrote an op-ed for The Washington Post criticizing US reliance on drones to fight AQAP. Mashhour argued that, by traumatizing the general population through civilian deaths, drone strikes such as the one in Radda inadvertently help AQAP recruit disgruntled Yemenis. She also criticized President Abdrabbuh Mansour Hadi's endorsement of drones, writing: "no leader can legitimately approve the extrajudicial killing of his own citizens."

Several United Nations officials voiced criticism over the strike, and urged compensation for the victims. Christof Heyns, the UN special rapporteur on extrajudicial, summary, or arbitrary executions, suggested that the strike was a violation of international humanitarian law and questioned the targeting process of US forces. Juan E. Mendez, the UN expert on torture, called the strike illegitimate and said it amounted to "cruel, inhuman or degrading treatment" of civilians. Amnesty International USA advocacy advisor Naureen Shah criticized the US for its opaqueness regarding the strike, and claimed that "it's taking a truly warped approach to accountability, leaking blanket denials of civilian casualties that are impossible to assess when so much basic information is withheld from the public."

Upon being questioned about the strike during a press conference, State Department deputy spokesperson Marie Harf said "Obviously, broadly speaking, we take every effort to minimize civilian casualties in counterterrorism operations—broadly speaking—without speaking to this one specifically." JSOC chief Votel, as well as US Central Command head Lloyd Austin, were frustrated by the Obama administration's relative silence and ambiguity concerning the strike at the time. They believed it was a valid operation against a group of militants, but was capitalized off of by AQAP due to misconceptions of civilian deaths. The generals, among other defense officials, viewed the situation as an example as to why military officials should be given more freedom in openly discussing and defending drone strikes they conduct.

=== Compensation ===
Three local tribal sheikhs met with representatives of the al-Amri and al-Tisi families in Radda amid the protests, during which they came upon an agreement that the government would compensate the relatives of the victims in exchange for them foregoing a violent response from the tribes in the region. The sheikhs organized a plan with al-Bayda governor al-Dhahri al-Shadadi, who at the time was arranging a compensation package from Sanaa. At a meeting hall in Radda on 14 December, Shadadi apologized for the deaths and negotiated with tribal representatives on the amount of money to be given for compensation. The negotiation process was accepted by the victims families after Shadadi pledged that no further drone strikes would take place in their area.

The tribal representatives initially lobbied for eleven times the standard compensation for the death of a man in tribal tradition, as well as 100 Kalashnikov rifles plus an extra one. Shadadi resisted the deal as it was engineered to be an admission of guilt and shame on part of the government, which would further its position locally. After debating throughout the whole day, the negotiators eventually agreed to allocate 12.7 million rials (approximately $60,000) for each of the 12 men killed, along with 105 Kalashnikov's. Official documents given to The Washington Post by Reprieve describe a total of $20,000 for the 15 who were injured. With $809,000 paid for casualties along with $265,000 in other related expenses, the total sum given by the government was over $1 million.

Shadadi delivered over $200,000 to the families initially, while the rest of the payment was deposited in July 2014, possibly due to Votel's persistence in denying civilian casualties. Several analysts expressed skepticism that such a large payment was allocated for a strike against legitimate militants and was completed entirely by Yemen, instead suggesting that the US was discreetly reimbursing the Yemeni government to pay compensation money without officially declaring any wrongdoing.

=== Drone strike moratorium ===
On December 15, Yemen's House of Representatives passed a bill to halt any further US drone strikes in the country. Lawmakers mentioned topics such as civilian casualties and maintaining Yemen's sovereignty during the proposition of the bill, which was passed in a near-unanimous vote. One parliamentarian, Ali al-Mamari, mentioned that AQAP was now stronger than it was before the strikes began. The passing of the bill was viewed as a symbolic gesture and a warning to the US and Hadi rather than definitive legislature, as bills passed by parliament are non-binding and can be struck down at the will of the President. Commentators presumed that Hadi would not let the bill abate the American drone campaign due his country's reliance on US foreign aid. An anonymous advisor to Hadi said that the bill "will ensure that even if drones continue, civilian casualties won't happen again."

Initially, the US government did not respond to the ban directly, though White House spokesman Jay Carney said that counterterrorism cooperation with Yemen will not be affected. However, the Obama administration internally decided to suspend JSOC's ability to conduct drone operations in Yemen, partially influenced by the CIA's negative report on the strike, which angered many commanders in the military. Despite the ban on JSOC, the CIA still had free rein to launch drone strikes in the country. The ban on JSOC activities was "being reconsidered" by US officials as of August 2014, and had been completely lifted by April 2015.

== See also ==
- 2009 United States attacks in Yemen
- 2025 Ras Isa oil terminal airstrikes
- 2025 Saada prison airstrike
