= Qaifah Al Mahn Yazid =

Qaifah Al Mahn Yazid قيفه آل محن يزيد
- Sub-district
- Country: Yemen
- Governorate: Al Bayda
- District: Al Quraishyah

Population (2004)
  - Total: 24,455
- Time zone: UTC+3

Qaifah Al Mahn Yazid (Arabic: قيفه آل محن يزيد) is a sub-district located in the Al Quraishyah District, Al Bayda Governorate, Yemen. Qaifah Al Mahn Yazid had a population of 24455 according to the 2004 census.

== Villages ==
- Khubzah
