= Al Abdullah and Al Hisham =

Al Abdullah and Al Hisham آل عبد الله وآل هشام
- Sub-district
- Country: Yemen
- Governorate: Al Bayda
- District: At Taffah

Population (2004)
  - Total: 5,530
- Time zone: UTC+3

Al Abdullah and Al Hisham (Arabic: آل عبد الله وآل هشام) is a sub-district located in At Taffah District, Al Bayda Governorate, Yemen.

== Population ==
Al Abdullah and Al Hisham had a population of 5530 according to the 2004 census.
