= Thamn Al-Ryashyyah =

Thamn Al-Ryashyyah ثمن الرياشية
- Sub-district
- Country: Yemen
- Governorate: Al Bayda
- District: Ar Ryashyyah

Population (2004)
  - Total: 7,793
- Time zone: UTC+3

Thamn Al-Ryashyyah (Arabic: ثمن الرياشية) is a sub-district located in the Ar Ryashyyah District, Al Bayda Governorate, Yemen. Thamn Al-Ryashyyah had a population of 7793 according to the 2004 census.
