= Al Saeed =

Al Saeed آل سعيد
- Sub-district
- Country: Yemen
- Governorate: Al Bayda
- District: As Sawma'ah

Population (2004)
  - Total: 3,883
- Time zone: UTC+3

Al Saeed (Arabic: آل سعيد) is a sub-district located in As Sawma'ah District, Al Bayda Governorate, Yemen. Al Saeed had a population of 3883 according to the 2004 census.
