= Al-Rybat =

Al-Rybat الرباط
- Sub-district
- Country: Yemen
- Governorate: Al Bayda
- District: Dhi Na'im

Population (2004)
  - Total: 5,071
- Time zone: UTC+3

Al-Rybat (Arabic: الرباط) is a sub-district located in Dhi Na'im District, Al Bayda Governorate, Yemen. Al-Rybat had a population of 5071 according to the 2004 census.
