= Al-Arwyn =

Al-Arwyn العروين
- Sub-district
- Country: Yemen
- Governorate: Al Bayda
- District: As Sawma'ah

Population (2004)
  - Total: 4,218
- Time zone: UTC+3

Al-Arwyn (Arabic: العروين) is a sub-district located in As Sawma'ah District, Al Bayda Governorate, Yemen. Al-Arwyn had a population of 4218 according to the 2004 census.
