= Al Amer Hawran =

Al Amer Hawran آل عامر حوران
- Sub-district
- Country: Yemen
- Governorate: Al Bayda
- District: Radman Al Awad

Population (2004)
  - Total: 2,233
- Time zone: UTC+3

Al Amer Hawran (Arabic: آل عامر حوران) is a sub-district located in Radman Al Awad District, Al Bayda Governorate, Yemen. Al Amer Hawran had a population of 2233 according to the 2004 census.
