= Tiyab, Yemen =

Tiyab طياب
- Sub-district
- Country: Yemen
- Governorate: Al Bayda
- District: Dhi Na'im

Population (2004)
  - Total: 2,392
- Time zone: UTC+3

Tiyab (Arabic: طياب) is a sub-district located in Dhi Na'im District, Al Bayda Governorate, Yemen. Tiyab had a population of 2392 according to the 2004 census.
