= Al-Maryah Bani Mur =

Al-Maryah Bani Mur المريه بني مر
- Sub-district
- Country: Yemen
- Governorate: Al Bayda
- District: Radman Al Awad

Population (2004)
  - Total: 2,627
- Time zone: UTC+3

Al-Maryah Bani Mur (Arabic: المريه بني مر) is a sub-district located in Radman Al Awad District, Al Bayda Governorate, Yemen. Al-Maryah Bani Mur had a population of 2627 according to the 2004 census.
