= Al-Jadir =

Al-Jadir الجدير
- Sub-district
- Country: Yemen
- Governorate: Al Bayda
- District: Na'man

Population (2004)
  - Total: 1,326
- Time zone: UTC+3

Al-Jadir (Arabic: الجدير) is a sub-district located in Na'man District, Al Bayda Governorate, Yemen. Al-Jadir had a population of 1326 according to the 2004 census.
