= Al-Tarthur =

Al-Tarthur الطرثور
- Sub-district
- Country: Yemen
- Governorate: Al Bayda
- District: Maswarah

Population (2004)
  - Total: 358
- Time zone: UTC+3

Al-Tarthur (Arabic: الطرثور) is a sub-district located in Maswarah District, Al Bayda Governorate, Yemen. Al-Tarthur had a population of 358 according to the 2004 census.
