= Jabal Al-Ryashyyah =

Jabal Al-Ryashyyah جبل الرياشية
- Sub-district
- Country: Yemen
- Governorate: Al Bayda
- District: Ar Ryashyyah

Population (2004)
  - Total: 7,331
- Time zone: UTC+3

Jabal Al-Ryashyyah (Arabic: جبل الرياشية) is a sub-district located in the Ar Ryashyyah District, Al Bayda Governorate, Yemen. Jabal Al-Ryashyyah had a population of 7331 according to the 2004 census.
