= Al-Rahabah =

Al-Rahabah الرحبة
- Sub-district
- Country: Yemen
- Governorate: Al Bayda
- District: Na'man

Population (2004)
  - Total: 1,311
- Time zone: UTC+3

Al-Rahabah (Arabic: الرحبة) is a sub-district located in Na'man District, Al Bayda Governorate, Yemen. Al-Rahabah had a population of 1311 according to the 2004 census.
