= Al-Qaisin =

Al-Qaisin القيسين
- Sub-district
- Country: Yemen
- Governorate: Al Bayda
- District: As Sawma'ah

Population (2004)
  - Total: 3,334
- Time zone: UTC+3

Al-Qaisin (Arabic: القيسين) is a sub-district located in As Sawma'ah District, Al Bayda Governorate, Yemen. Al-Qaisin had a population of 3334 according to the 2004 census.
