= Al-Dhahaki =

Al-Aywf الضحاكي
- Sub-district
- Country: Yemen
- Governorate: Al Bayda
- District: Al Bayda District

Population (2004)
  - Total: 2,370
- Time zone: UTC+3

Al-Aywf (Arabic: الضحاكي) is a sub-district located in the Al Bayda District, Al Bayda Governorate, Yemen. Al-Aywf had a population of 2370 according to the 2004 census.
