= Al Mudhafr Al-Alla =

Al Mudhafr Al-Alla آل مظفر الأعلى
- Sub-district
- Country: Yemen
- Governorate: Al Bayda
- District: Al Bayda District

Population (2004)
  - Total: 5,098
- Time zone: UTC+3

Al Mudhafr Al-Alla (Arabic: آل مظفر الأعلى) is a sub-district located in the Al Bayda District, Al Bayda Governorate, Yemen. Al Mudhafr Al-Alla had a population of 5098 according to the 2004 census.
