= Afar Al Miftah =

Afar Al Miftah عفار آل مفتاح
- Sub-district
- Country: Yemen
- Governorate: Al Bayda
- District: Al Malagim

Population (2004)
  - Total: 4,850
- Time zone: UTC+3

Afar Al Miftah (Arabic: عفار آل مفتاح) is a sub-district located in the Al Malagim District, Al Bayda Governorate, Yemen. Afar Al Miftah had a population of 4850 according to the 2004 census.
