= Al-Qahabh =

Al-Qahabh القهابة
- Sub-district
- Country: Yemen
- Governorate: Al Bayda
- District: At Taffah

Population (2004)
  - Total: 728
- Time zone: UTC+3

Al-Qahabh (Arabic: القهابة) is a sub-district located in At Taffah District, Al Bayda Governorate, Yemen. Al-Qahabh had a population of 728 according to the 2004 census.
