= Al-Masharah =

Al-Masharah المشاعرة
- Sub-district
- Country: Yemen
- Governorate: Al Bayda
- District: At Taffah

Population (2004)
  - Total: 1,821
- Time zone: UTC+3

Al-Masharah (Arabic: المشاعرة) is a sub-district located in At Taffah District, Al Bayda Governorate, Yemen. Al-Masharah had a population of 1821 according to the 2004 census.
