= Al-Mahamadin =

Al-Mahamadin المحمدين
- Sub-district
- Country: Yemen
- Governorate: Al Bayda
- District: As Sawma'ah

Population (2004)
  - Total: 469
- Time zone: UTC+3

Al-Mahamadin (Arabic: المحمدين) is a sub-district located in As Sawma'ah District, Al Bayda Governorate, Yemen. Al-Mahamadin had a population of 469 according to the 2004 census.
