= Al Al-Thurya =

Al Al-Thurya آل الثرياء
- Sub-district
- Country: Yemen
- Governorate: Al Bayda
- District: As Sawma'ah

Population (2004)
  - Total: 2,229
- Time zone: UTC+3

Al Al-Thurya (Arabic: آل الثرياء) is a sub-district located in As Sawma'ah District, Al Bayda Governorate, Yemen. Al Al-Thurya had a population of 2229 according to the 2004 census.
