= Al Hadi Bani Wahb =

Al Hadi Bani Wahb آل هادي بني وهب
- Sub-district
- Country: Yemen
- Governorate: Al Bayda
- District: As Sawadiyah

Population (2004)
  - Total: 4,047
- Time zone: UTC+3

Al Hadi Bani Wahb (Arabic: آل هادي بني وهب) is a sub-district located in As Sawadiyah District, Al Bayda Governorate, Yemen. Al Hadi Bani Wahb had a population of 4047 according to the 2004 census.
