= Al-Daymah =

Al-Daymah الدعيمة
- Sub-district
- Country: Yemen
- Governorate: Al Bayda
- District: Nati'

Population (2004)
  - Total: 772
- Time zone: UTC+3

Al-Daymah (Arabic: الدعيمة) is a sub-district located in Nati' District, Al Bayda Governorate, Yemen. Al-Daymah had a population of 772 according to the 2004 census.
