= Shayan, Yemen =

Shayan شعيان
- Sub-district
- Country: Yemen
- Governorate: Al Bayda
- District: Maswarah

Population (2004)
  - Total: 1,003
- Time zone: UTC+3

Shayan (Arabic: شعيان) is a sub-district located in Maswarah District, Al Bayda Governorate, Yemen. Shayan had a population of 1003 according to the 2004 census.
