= Al-Sahah =

Al-Sahah الساحة
- Sub-district
- Country: Yemen
- Governorate: Al Bayda
- District: Na'man

Population (2004)
  - Total: 891
- Time zone: UTC+3

Al-Sahah (Arabic: الساحة) is a sub-district located in Na'man District, Al Bayda Governorate, Yemen. Al-Sahah had a population of 891 according to the 2004 census.
