= Qaifah Al Mahn Al-Jawf =

QQaifah Al Mahn Al-Jawf قيفة آل محن الجوف
- Sub-district
- Country: Yemen
- Governorate: Al Bayda
- District: Al Quraishyah

Population (2004)
  - Total: 2,407
- Time zone: UTC+3

Qaifah Al Mahn Al-Jawf (Arabic: قيفة آل محن الجوف) is a sub-district located in Al Quraishyah District, Al Bayda Governorate, Yemen. QQaifah Al Mahn Al-Jawf had a population of 2407 according to the 2004 census.
