= Al Al-Yahwi =

Al Al-Yahwi آل اليحوي
- Sub-district
- Country: Yemen
- Governorate: Al Bayda
- District: As Sawma'ah

Population (2004)
  - Total: 4,251
- Time zone: UTC+3

Al Al-Yahwi (Arabic: آل اليحوي) is a sub-district located in As Sawma'ah District, Al Bayda Governorate, Yemen. Al Al-Yahwi had a population of 4251 according to the 2004 census.
