= Al-Mirhadh =

Al-Mirhadh المرحاض
- Sub-district
- Country: Yemen
- Governorate: Al Bayda
- District: Na'man

Population (2004)
  - Total: 987
- Time zone: UTC+3

Al-Mirhadh (Arabic: المرحاض) is a sub-district located in Na'man District, Al Bayda Governorate, Yemen. Al-Mirhadh had a population of 987 according to the 2004 census.
