= Hasir Al-Jar =

Hasir Al-Jar حصير الجار
- Sub-district
- Country: Yemen
- Governorate: Al Bayda
- District: Na'man

Population (2004)
  - Total: 495
- Time zone: UTC+3

Hasir Al-Jar (Arabic: حصير الجار) is a sub-district located in Na'man District, Al Bayda Governorate, Yemen. Hasir Al-Jar had a population of 495 according to the 2004 census.
