= Dathran Al Alwi =

Dathran Al Alwi دثران آل علوي
- Sub-district
- Country: Yemen
- Governorate: Al Bayda
- District: Maswarah

Population (2004)
  - Total: 2,769
- Time zone: UTC+3

Dathran Al Alwi (Arabic: دثران آل علوي) is a sub-district located in Maswarah District, Al Bayda Governorate, Yemen. Dathran Al Alwi had a population of 2769 according to the 2004 census.
