= Al-Manqata =

Al-Manqata قربة
- Sub-district
- Country: Yemen
- Governorate: Al Bayda
- District: Dhi Na'im

Population (2004)
  - Total: 6,736
- Time zone: UTC+3

Al-Manqata (Arabic: المنقطع) is a sub-district located in Dhi Na'im District, Al Bayda Governorate, Yemen. Al-Manqata had a population of 6736 according to the 2004 census.
