= Al Allabni =

Al Allabni آل اللبني
- Sub-district
- Country: Yemen
- Governorate: Al Bayda
- District: Al Bayda District

Population (2004)
  - Total: 1,933
- Time zone: UTC+3

Al Allabni (Arabic: آل اللبني) is a sub-district located in the Al Bayda District, Al Bayda Governorate, Yemen. Al Allabni had a population of 1933 according to the 2004 census.
