= Qaifah Al Mahn Ladhahrh =

Qaifah Al Mahn Ladhahrh قيفة آل محن لظهرة
- Sub-district
- Country: Yemen
- Governorate: Al Bayda
- District: Al Quraishyah

Population (2004)
  - Total: 2,663
- Time zone: UTC+3

Qaifah Al Mahn Ladhahrh (Arabic: قيفة آل محن لظهرة) is a sub-district located in the Al Quraishyah District, Al Bayda Governorate, Yemen. Qaifah Al Mahn Ladhahrh had a population of 2663 according to the 2004 census.
