= Maswarah =

Maswarah مسورة
- Sub-district
- Country: Yemen
- Governorate: Al Bayda
- District: Maswarah

Population (2004)
  - Total: 1,228
- Time zone: UTC+3

Maswarah (Arabic: مسورة) is a sub-district located in Maswarah District, Al Bayda Governorate, Yemen. Maswarah had a population of 1228 according to the 2004 census.
