= Ghul Sulaiman =

Ghul Sulaiman غول سليمان
- Sub-district
- Country: Yemen
- Governorate: Al Bayda
- District: Radman Al Awad

Population (2004)
  - Total: 2,314
- Time zone: UTC+3

Ghul Sulaiman (Arabic: غول سليمان) is a sub-district located in Radman Al Awad District, Al Bayda Governorate, Yemen. Ghul Sulaiman had a population of 2314 according to the 2004 census.
