= Maswar Al Dabash =

Maswar Al Dabash مسور آل دباش
- Sub-district
- Country: Yemen
- Governorate: Al Bayda
- District: Nati'

Population (2004)
  - Total: 2,307
- Time zone: UTC+3

Maswar Al Dabash (Arabic: مسور آل دباش) is a sub-district located in Nati' District, Al Bayda Governorate, Yemen. Maswar Al Dabash had a population of 2307 according to the 2004 census.
