= Dhahbah =

Dhahbah ذاهبة
- Sub-district
- Country: Yemen
- Governorate: Al Bayda
- District: As Sawadiyah

Population (2004)
  - Total: 3,210
- Time zone: UTC+3

Dhahbah (Arabic: ذاهبة) is a sub-district located in As Sawadiyah District, Al Bayda Governorate, Yemen. Dhahbah had a population of 3210 according to the 2004 census.
