= Al-Farawi =

Al-Farawi (Dhi Misn الفروي
- Sub-district
- Country: Yemen
- Governorate: Al Bayda
- District: As Sawma'ah

Population (2004)
  - Total: 1,601
- Time zone: UTC+3

Al-Farawi (Dhi Misn (Arabic: الفروي) is a sub-district located in As Sawma'ah District, Al Bayda Governorate, Yemen. Al-Farawi (Dhi Misn had a population of 1601 according to the 2004 census.
