= Al-Baraman =

Al-Baraman آل برمان
- Sub-district
- Country: Yemen
- Governorate: Al Bayda
- District: Az Zahir

Population (2004)
  - Total: 5,230
- Time zone: UTC+3

Al-Baraman (Arabic: آل برمان) is a sub-district located in Az Zahir District, Al Bayda Governorate, Yemen. Al-Baraman had a population of 5230 according to the 2004 census.
