= Al-Lama'an =

Al-Lama'an اللمعان
- Sub-district
- Interactive map of Al-Lama'an
- Coordinates: 14.38453°N 44.70472°E
- Country: Yemen
- Governorate: Al Bayda
- District: Al A'rsh district

Population (2004)
  - Total: 1,093
- Time zone: UTC+3

Al-Lama'an (Arabic: اللمعان) is a sub-district located in the Al A'rsh district, Al Bayda Governorate, Yemen. Al-Lama'an had a population of 1093 according to the 2004 census.
