= Beihan Al-Dawlah =

Beihan Al-Dawlah بيحان الدولة
- Sub-district
- Country: Yemen
- Governorate: Al Bayda
- District: Maswarah

Population (2004)
  - Total: 880
- Time zone: UTC+3

Beihan Al-Dawlah (Arabic: بيحان الدولة) is a sub-district located in Maswarah District, Al Bayda Governorate, Yemen. Beihan Al-Dawlah had a population of 880 according to the 2004 census.
