= Al-Sawma'ah =

Al-Sawma'ah الصومعة
- Sub-district
- Country: Yemen
- Governorate: Al Bayda
- District: As Sawma'ah

Population (2004)
  - Total: 5,812
- Time zone: UTC+3

Al-Sawma'ah (Arabic: الصومعة) is a sub-district located in As Sawma'ah District, Al Bayda Governorate, Yemen. Al-Sawma'ah had a population of 5812 according to the 2004 census.
