= Dhamsanwmah =

Dhamsanwmah ذمسنومة
- Sub-district
- Country: Yemen
- Governorate: Al Bayda
- District: Nati'

Population (2004)
  - Total: 757
- Time zone: UTC+3

Dhamsanwmah (Arabic: ذمسنومة) is a sub-district located in Nati' District, Al Bayda Governorate, Yemen. Dhamsanwmah had a population of 757 according to the 2004 census.
