= Al-Jarw =

Al-Jarw الجرو
- Sub-district
- Country: Yemen
- Governorate: Al Bayda
- District: As Sawma'ah

Population (2004)
  - Total: 2,004
- Time zone: UTC+3

Al-Jarw (Arabic: الجرو) is a sub-district located in As Sawma'ah District, Al Bayda Governorate, Yemen. Al-Jarw had a population of 2004 according to the 2004 census.
