= Al Abaid =

Al Abaid آل عبيد
- Sub-district
- Country: Yemen
- Governorate: Al Bayda
- District: As Sawma'ah

Population (2004)
  - Total: 6,453
- Time zone: UTC+3

Al Abaid (Arabic: آل عبيد) is a sub-district located in As Sawma'ah District, Al Bayda Governorate, Yemen. Al Abaid had a population of 6453 according to the 2004 census.
