= Al-Dhafryn =

Al-Ghafryn الظفرين
- Sub-district
- Country: Yemen
- Governorate: Al Bayda
- District: At Taffah

Population (2004)
  - Total: 2,320
- Time zone: UTC+3

Al-Ghafryn (Arabic: الظفرين) is a sub-district located in At Taffah District, Al Bayda Governorate, Yemen. Al-Ghafryn had a population of 2320 according to the 2004 census.
