= Al Ghanim, Yemen =

Al Ghanim آل غنيم
- Sub-district
- Country: Yemen
- Governorate: Al Bayda
- District: Ash Sharyah

Population (2004)
  - Total: 33,873
- Time zone: UTC+3

Al Ghanim (Arabic: آل غنيم) is a sub-district located in Ash Sharyah District, Al Bayda Governorate, Yemen. Al Ghanim had a population of 33873 according to the 2004 census.
