= Al Hasis =

Al Hasis آل هصيص
- Sub-district
- Country: Yemen
- Governorate: Al Bayda
- District: Al Bayda District

Population (2004)
  - Total: 5,708
- Time zone: UTC+3

Al Hasis (Arabic: آل هصيص) is a sub-district located in the Al Bayda District, Al Bayda Governorate, Yemen. Al Hasis had a population of 5708 according to the 2004 census.
