= Al-Sawda and Al Issa Wahi =

Al-Sawda and Al Issa Wahi السوداء وال عيسى وحي
- Sub-district
- Country: Yemen
- Governorate: Al Bayda
- District: Al Bayda District

Population (2004)
  - Total: 3,851
- Time zone: UTC+3

Al-Sawda and Al Issa Wahi (Arabic: السوداء وال عيسى وحي) is a sub-district located in the Al Bayda District, Al Bayda Governorate, Yemen. Al-Sawda and Al Issa Wahi had a population of 3851 according to the 2004 census.
