= Wadi Al-Ryashyyah =

Wadi Al-Ryashyyah وادي الرياشية
- Sub-district
- Country: Yemen
- Governorate: Al Bayda
- District: Ar Ryashyyah

Population (2004)
  - Total: 7,718
- Time zone: UTC+3

Wadi Al-Ryashyyah (Arabic: وادي الرياشية) is a sub-district located in the Ar Ryashyyah District, Al Bayda Governorate, Yemen. Wadi Al-Ryashyyah had a population of 7718 according to the 2004 census.
