= Al-Aghwal Al-Sufla =

Al-Aghwal Al-Sufla الاغوال السفلى
- Sub-district
- Country: Yemen
- Governorate: Al Bayda
- District: Radman Al Awad

Population (2004)
  - Total: 1,961
- Time zone: UTC+3

Al-Aghwal Al-Sufla (Arabic: الاغوال السفلى) is a sub-district located in Radman Al Awad District, Al Bayda Governorate, Yemen. Al-Aghwal Al-Sufla had a population of 1961 according to the 2004 census.
