= Al-Saydyah =

Al-Saydyah السعيدية
- Sub-district
- Country: Yemen
- Governorate: Al Bayda
- District: At Taffah

Population (2004)
  - Total: 1,251
- Time zone: UTC+3

Al-Saydyah (Arabic: السعيدية) is a sub-district located in At Taffah District, Al Bayda Governorate, Yemen. Al-Saydyah had a population of 1251 according to the 2004 census.
