= Al-Haratik =

Al-Haratik الحراتيك
- Sub-district
- Country: Yemen
- Governorate: Al Bayda
- District: As Sawadiyah

Population (2004)
  - Total: 2,410
- Time zone: UTC+3

Al-Haratik (Arabic: الحراتيك) is a sub-district located in As Sawadiyah District, Al Bayda Governorate, Yemen. Al-Haratik had a population of 2410 according to the 2004 census.
