= Sanah, Yemen =

Sanah صنة
- Sub-district
- Country: Yemen
- Governorate: Al Bayda
- District: At Taffah

Population (2004)
  - Total: 1,131
- Time zone: UTC+3

Sanah (Arabic: صنة) is a sub-district located in At Taffah District, Al Bayda Governorate, Yemen. Sanah had a population of 1131 according to the 2004 census.
