= Thamnan =

Thamnan ثمنان
- Sub-district
- Country: Yemen
- Governorate: Al Bayda
- District: At Taffah

Population (2004)
  - Total: 348
- Time zone: UTC+3

Thamnan (Arabic: ثمنان) is a sub-district located in At Taffah District, Al Bayda Governorate, Yemen. Thamnan had a population of 348 according to the 2004 census.
