= Qayfah Al Mahdi =

Qayfah Al Mahdi قيفة آل مهدي
- Sub-district
- Country: Yemen
- Governorate: Al Bayda
- District: Wald Rabi'

Population (2004)
  - Total: 19,427
- Time zone: UTC+3

Qayfah Al Mahdi (Arabic: قيفة آل مهدي) is a sub-district located in the Wald Rabi' District, Al Bayda Governorate, Yemen. Qayfah Al Mahdi had a population of 19,427, according to the 2004 census.
