= Damaj, Al-Bayda =

Damaj دماج
- Sub-district
- Country: Yemen
- Governorate: Al Bayda
- District: Maswarah

Population (2004)
  - Total: 800
- Time zone: UTC+3

Damaj (Arabic: دماج) is a sub-district located in Maswarah District, Al Bayda Governorate, Yemen. Damaj had a population of 800 according to the 2004 census.
