= Al Hayash =

الطفة ـاسماع الطفة
- Sub-district
- اسماع
- Location in Yemen
- Coordinates: 14°7′48″N 45°20′21″E
- Country: Yemen
- Governorate: Al Bayda
- District: At Taffah

Population (2004)
  - Total: 7,116
- Time zone: UTC+3

Al Hayash (Arabic: آل هياش) is a sub-district located in At Taffah District, Al Bayda Governorate, Yemen. Al Hayash had a population of 7116 according to the 2004 census.
