= Al Al-Sadah =

Al Al-Sadah ال السادة
- Sub-district
- Country: Yemen
- Governorate: Al Bayda
- District: As Sawadiyah

Population (2004)
  - Total: 1,515
- Time zone: UTC+3

Al Al-Sadah (Arabic: ال السادة) is a sub-district located in As Sawadiyah District, Al Bayda Governorate, Yemen. Al Al-Sadah had a population of 1515 according to the 2004 census.
