= Al Mansour Bani Wahb =

Al Mansour Bani Wahb آل منصور بني وهب
- Sub-district
- Country: Yemen
- Governorate: Al Bayda
- District: As Sawadiyah

Population (2004)
  - Total: 6,975
- Time zone: UTC+3

Al Mansour Bani Wahb (Arabic: آل منصور بني وهب) is a sub-district located in As Sawadiyah District, Al Bayda Governorate, Yemen. Al Mansour Bani Wahb had a population of 6975 according to the 2004 census.
