= Al-Aywf =

Al-Aywf العيوف
- Sub-district
- Country: Yemen
- Governorate: Al Bayda
- District: Al Bayda District

Population (2004)
  - Total: 1,090
- Time zone: UTC+3

Al-Aywf (Arabic: العيوف) is a sub-district located in the Al Bayda District, Al Bayda Governorate, Yemen. Al-Aywf had a population of 1090 according to the 2004 census.
