= Al-Badea =

Al-Badea البديع
- Sub-district
- Country: Yemen
- Governorate: Al Bayda
- District: Na'man

Population (2004)
  - Total: 1,355
- Time zone: UTC+3

Al-Badea (Arabic: البديع) is a sub-district located in Na'man District, Al Bayda Governorate, Yemen. Al-Badea had a population of 1355 according to the 2004 census.
