= Al Mansour Al-Malajm =

Al Mansour Al-Malajm آل منصور الملاجم
- Sub-district
- Country: Yemen
- Governorate: Al Bayda
- District: Al Malagim

Population (2004)
  - Total: 9,562
- Time zone: UTC+3

Al Mansour Al-Malajm (Arabic: آل منصور الملاجم) is a sub-district located in the Al Malagim District, Al Bayda Governorate, Yemen. Al Mansour Al-Malajm had a population of 9562 according to the 2004 census.
