= Al-Hajrah =

Al-Hajrah الهجرة
- Sub-district
- Country: Yemen
- Governorate: Al Bayda
- District: Al Bayda District

Population (2004)
  - Total: 7,707
- Time zone: UTC+3

Al-Hajrah (Arabic: الهجرة) is a sub-district located in the Al Bayda District, Al Bayda Governorate, Yemen. Al-Hajrah had a population of 7707 according to the 2004 census.
