= Al Amer =

Al Amer آل عامر
- Sub-district
- Country: Yemen
- Governorate: Al Bayda
- District: Radman Al Awad

Population (2004)
  - Total: 1,768
- Time zone: UTC+3

Al Amer (Arabic: آل عامر) is a sub-district located in Radman Al Awad District, Al Bayda Governorate, Yemen. Al Amer had a population of 1768 according to the 2004 census.
