= Al-Darya'a =

Al-Darya'a قربة
- Sub-district
- Country: Yemen
- Governorate: Al Bayda
- District: Dhi Na'im

Population (2004)
  - Total: 4,366
- Time zone: UTC+3

Al-Darya'a (Arabic: الدريعأ) is a sub-district located in Dhi Na'im District, Al Bayda Governorate, Yemen. Al-Darya'a had a population of 4366 according to the 2004 census.
