= Al Hajar, Yemen =

Al Hajar
- Location in Yemen
- Coordinates: 14°19′43″N 45°0′31″E
- Country: Yemen
- Governorate: Al Bayda'
- District: Ash Sharyah
- Elevation: 6,565 ft (2,001 m)
- Time zone: UTC+3 (Yemen Standard Time)

Al Hajar is a village in Yemen, also known as Al Hajara`. It is located in the Ash Sharyah District of the Al Bayda' Governorate.
