= Al Baqsh =

Al Baqsh آل بقش
- Sub-district
- Country: Yemen
- Governorate: Al Bayda
- District: Radman Al Awad

Population (2004)
  - Total: 2,298
- Time zone: UTC+3

Al Baqsh (Arabic: آل بقش) is a sub-district located in Radman Al Awad District, Al Bayda Governorate, Yemen. Al Baqsh had a population of 2298 according to the 2004 census.
