= Al-Haykal =

Al-Haykal الحيكل
- Sub-district
- Location in Yemen
- Coordinates: 14°3′41″N 45°29′27″E
- Country: Yemen
- Governorate: Al Bayda
- District: Dhi Na'im

Population (2004)
  - Total: 4,957
- Time zone: UTC+3

Al-Haykal (Arabic: الحيكل) is a sub-district located in Dhi Na'im District, Al Bayda Governorate, Yemen. Al-Haykal had a population of 4957 according to the 2004 census.
