= Al Farj =

Al Farj آل فرج
- Sub-district
- Country: Yemen
- Governorate: Al Bayda
- District: Nati'

Population (2004)
  - Total: 778
- Time zone: UTC+3

Al Farj (Arabic: آل فرج) is a sub-district located in Nati' District, Al Bayda Governorate, Yemen. Al Farj had a population of 778 according to the 2004 census.
