= Al-Sharf =

Al-Sharf الشرف
- Sub-district
- Country: Yemen
- Governorate: Al Bayda
- District: Al Bayda District

Population (2004)
  - Total: 5,017
- Time zone: UTC+3

Al-Sharf (Arabic: الشرف) is a sub-district located in the Al Bayda District, Al Bayda Governorate, Yemen. Al-Sharf had a population of 5017 according to the 2004 census.
