= Al-Radmani =

Al-Radmani الردماني
- Sub-district
- Country: Yemen
- Governorate: Al Bayda
- District: As Sawma'ah

Population (2004)
  - Total: 255
- Time zone: UTC+3

Al-Radmani (Arabic: الردماني) is a sub-district located in As Sawma'ah District, Al Bayda Governorate, Yemen. Al-Radmani had a population of 255 according to the 2004 census.
