= Al-Tahyryah =

Al-Tahyryah الطاهرية
- Sub-district
- Country: Yemen
- Governorate: Al Bayda
- District: As Sawadiyah

Population (2004)
  - Total: 3,618
- Time zone: UTC+3

Al-Tahyryah (Arabic: الطاهرية) is a sub-district located in As Sawadiyah District, Al Bayda Governorate, Yemen. Al-Tahyryah had a population of 3618 according to the 2004 census.
