= Radman Al Awadh =

Radman Al Awadh ردمان آل عوض
- Sub-district
- Country: Yemen
- Governorate: Al Bayda
- District: Radman Al Awad

Population (2004)
  - Total: 1,298
- Time zone: UTC+3

Radman Al Awadh (Arabic: ردمان آل عوض) is a sub-district located in Radman Al Awad District, Al Bayda Governorate, Yemen. Radman Al Awadh had a population of 1298 according to the 2004 census.
