= Hajra, Yemen =

Hajra حجراء
- Sub-district
- Country: Yemen
- Governorate: Al Bayda
- District: Na'man

Population (2004)
  - Total: 531
- Time zone: UTC+3

Hajra (Arabic: حجراء) is a sub-district located in Na'man District, Al Bayda Governorate, Yemen. Hajra had a population of 531 according to the 2004 census.
