= Al Mansour =

Al Mansour آل منصور
- Sub-district
- Country: Yemen
- Governorate: Al Bayda
- District: Nati'

Population (2004)
  - Total: 1,066
- Time zone: UTC+3

Al Mansour (Arabic: آل منصور) is a sub-district located in Nati' District, Al Bayda Governorate, Yemen. Al Mansour had a population of 1066 according to the 2004 census.
