= Wa'ala Al Raqab =

Wa'ala Al Raqab وعله آل رقاب
- Sub-district
- Country: Yemen
- Governorate: Al Bayda
- District: Nati'

Population (2004)
  - Total: 2,105
- Time zone: UTC+3

Wa'ala Al Raqab (Arabic: وعله آل رقاب) is a sub-district located in Nati' District, Al Bayda Governorate, Yemen. Wa'ala Al Raqab had a population of 2105 according to the 2004 census.
