= Al-Masahrah =

Al-Masahrah المساحرة
- Sub-district
- Country: Yemen
- Governorate: Al Bayda
- District: At Taffah

Population (2004)
  - Total: 1,913
- Time zone: UTC+3

Al-Masahrah (Arabic: المساحرة) is a sub-district located in At Taffah District, Al Bayda Governorate, Yemen. Al-Masahrah had a population of 1913 according to the 2004 census.
