= Al-Ghailah =

Al-Ghailah الغيلة
- Sub-district
- Country: Yemen
- Governorate: Al Bayda
- District: Nati'

Population (2004)
  - Total: 1,471
- Time zone: UTC+3

Al-Ghailah (Arabic: الغيلة) is a sub-district located in Nati' District, Al Bayda Governorate, Yemen. Al-Ghailah had a population of 1471 according to the 2004 census.
