= Al-Nasyfah =

Al-Nasyfah الناصفة
- Sub-district
- Country: Yemen
- Governorate: Al Bayda
- District: Az Zahir

Population (2004)
  - Total: 7,207
- Time zone: UTC+3

Al-Nasyfah (Arabic: الناصفة) is a sub-district located in Az Zahir District, Al Bayda Governorate, Yemen. Al-Nasyfah had a population of 7207 according to the 2004 census.
