= Al Sawdan =

Al Sawdan آل سودان
- Sub-district
- Country: Yemen
- Governorate: Al Bayda
- District: Nati'

Population (2004)
  - Total: 1,166
- Time zone: UTC+3

Al Sawdan (Arabic: آل سودان) is a sub-district located in Nati' District, Al Bayda Governorate, Yemen. Al Sawdan had a population of 1166 according to the 2004 census.
