= Al-Aghwal Al-Allia =

Al-Aghwal Al-Allia الاغوال العلياء
- Sub-district
- Country: Yemen
- Governorate: Al Bayda
- District: Radman Al Awad

Population (2004)
  - Total: 1,401
- Time zone: UTC+3

Al-Aghwal Al-Allia (Arabic: الاغوال العلياء) is a sub-district located in Radman Al Awad District, Al Bayda Governorate, Yemen. Al-Aghwal Al-Allia had a population of 1401 according to the 2004 census.
