= Qarbah =

Qarbah قربة
- Sub-district
- Country: Yemen
- Governorate: Al Bayda
- District: Az Zahir

Population (2004)
  - Total: 2,582
- Time zone: UTC+3

Qarbah (Arabic: قربة) is a sub-district located in Az Zahir District, Al Bayda Governorate, Yemen. Qarbah had a population of 2582 according to the 2004 census.
