= Qanyah =

Qanyah قانية
- Sub-district
- Country: Yemen
- Governorate: Al Bayda
- District: Radman Al Awad

Population (2004)
  - Total: 2,806
- Time zone: UTC+3

Qanyah (Arabic: قانية) is a sub-district located in Radman Al Awad District, Al Bayda Governorate, Yemen. Qanyah had a population of 2806 according to the 2004 census.
