= Al-Hasa, Yemen =

Al-Hasa الحساء
- Sub-district
- Country: Yemen
- Governorate: Al Bayda
- District: Nati'

Population (2004)
  - Total: 799
- Time zone: UTC+3

Al-Hasa (Arabic: الحساء) is a sub-district located in Nati' District, Al Bayda Governorate, Yemen. Al-Hasa had a population of 799 according to the 2004 census.
