= Dhamjir =

Dhamjir ذمجير
- Sub-district
- Location in Yemen
- Country: Yemen
- Governorate: Al Bayda
- District: Dhi Na'im

Population (2004)
  - Total: 2,237
- Time zone: UTC+3

Dhamjir (Arabic: ذمجير) is a sub-district located in Dhi Na'im District, Al Bayda Governorate, Yemen. Dhamjir had a population of 2237 according to the 2004 census.
