= Aqlah Bani Amer =

Aqlah Bani Amer عقلة بني عامر
- Sub-district
- Country: Yemen
- Governorate: Al Bayda
- District: As Sawma'ah

Population (2004)
  - Total: 3,657
- Time zone: UTC+3

Aqlah Bani Amer (Arabic: عقلة بني عامر) is a sub-district located in As Sawma'ah District, Al Bayda Governorate, Yemen. Aqlah Bani Amer had a population of 3657 according to the 2004 census.
