= Faqa'a Al-Awadh =

Faqa'a Al-Awadh فاقع آل عوض
- Sub-district
- Country: Yemen
- Governorate: Al Bayda
- District: Radman Al Awad

Population (2004)
  - Total: 1,444
- Time zone: UTC+3

Faqa'a Al-Awadh (Arabic: فاقع آل عوض) is a sub-district located in Radman Al Awad District, Al Bayda Governorate, Yemen. Faqa'a Al-Awadh had a population of 1444 according to the 2004 census.
