= Raymah, Al-Bayda =

Raymah ريمة
- Sub-district
- Country: Yemen
- Governorate: Al Bayda
- District: Nati'

Population (2004)
  - Total: 965
- Time zone: UTC+3

Raymah (Arabic: ريمة) is a sub-district located in Nati' District, Al Bayda Governorate, Yemen. Raymah had a population of 965 according to the 2004 census.
