= Al-Habaj =

Al-Habaj الحبج
- Sub-district
- Country: Yemen
- Governorate: Al Bayda
- District: Az Zahir

Population (2004)
  - Total: 2,746
- Time zone: UTC+3

Al-Habaj (Arabic: الحبج) is a sub-district located in Az Zahir District, Al Bayda Governorate, Yemen. Al-Habaj had a population of 2746 according to the 2004 census.
