= Al Mudhafr Al-Asfal =

Al Mudhafr Al-Asfal آل مظفر الأسفل
- Sub-district
- Country: Yemen
- Governorate: Al Bayda
- District: Al Bayda District

Population (2004)
  - Total: 3,527
- Time zone: UTC+3

Al Mudhafr Al-Asfal (Arabic: آل مظفر الأسفل) is a sub-district located in the Al Bayda District, Al Bayda Governorate, Yemen. Al Mudhafr Al-Asfal had a population of 3527 according to the 2004 census.
