= Baramad =

Baramad بارماد
- Sub-district
- Location in Yemen
- Country: Yemen
- Governorate: Al Bayda
- District: Nati'

Population (2004)
  - Total: 636
- Time zone: UTC+3

Baramad (Arabic: بارماد) is a sub-district located in Nati' District, Al Bayda Governorate, Yemen. Baramad had a population of 636 according to the 2004 census.
