= Al-Bayda gas station explosion =

Gas explosion in al-Bayda, Yemen

- Date: 11 January 2025
- Location: Al-Zahir, al-Bayda Governorate, Yemen
- Deaths: ≥40
- Injuries: ≥74

On 11 January 2025, a gas station and a storage tanker exploded in Yemen's Al-Zahir district, located in Al Bayda Governorate. The explosion and subsequent fire killed 40 people and injured at least 74 more, including 50 critically.

== Background ==
The explosion occurred in Al Bayda Governorate in central Yemen, a region under the control of the Iranian-backed Houthi rebels. The province has been a significant focal point in the ongoing Yemeni Civil War, which began in 2014, and has experienced numerous conflicts and incidents as part of the larger civil war context, such as the Al Bayda offensive and the 2024 al-Bayda bombing.

== Explosion ==
The explosions took place in the Nassefa area of the Al-Zahir district, involving four gas stations and a gas storage container located in a popular market. The explosion occurred after a stray bullet from Houthis shooting at a car struck a nearby gas station. At the time of the explosions, the market was reportedly crowded with people, vendors, and vehicles. The explosions triggered an extensive fire that produced massive smoke columns visible from considerable distances. The blast destroyed numerous vehicles in the vicinity. At least 40 people were killed in the explosion. Among the 74 people injured in the incident, 50 sustained critical injuries. Rescue teams conducted searches for missing individuals.
