= Al-Ghul =

Al-Ghul الغول
- Sub-district
- Country: Yemen
- Governorate: Al Bayda
- District: Na'man

Population (2004)
  - Total: 931
- Time zone: UTC+3

Al-Ghul (Arabic: الغول) is a sub-district located in Na'man District, Al Bayda Governorate, Yemen. Al-Ghul had a population of 931 according to the 2004 census.

== See also ==
- Asma al-Ghul (born 1982), Palestinian feminist journalist
