= Bani Ghaylan =

Bani Ghaylan المساحرة
- Sub-district
- Location in Yemen
- Coordinates: 14°04′12″N 45°14′44″E
- Country: Yemen
- Governorate: Al Bayda
- District: At Taffah

Population (2004)
  - Total: 926
- Time zone: UTC+3

Bani Ghaylan (Arabic: بني غيلان) is a sub-district located in At Taffah District, Al Bayda Governorate, Yemen. Bani Ghaylan had a population of 926 according to the 2004 census.
