= Al-Lakhaf =

Al-Lakhaf اللخف
- Sub-district
- Location in Yemen
- Coordinates: 14°41′41″N 45°36′0″E
- Country: Yemen
- Governorate: Al Bayda
- District: Na'man

Population (2004)
  - Total: 465
- Time zone: UTC+3

Al-Lakhaf (Arabic: اللخف) is a sub-district located in Na'man District, Al Bayda Governorate, Yemen. Al-Lakhaf had a population of 465 according to the 2004 census.
