= Al Ghasham Al-Malajm =

Al Ghasham Al-Malajm آل غشام الملاجم
- Sub-district
- Country: Yemen
- Governorate: Al Bayda
- District: Al Malagim

Population (2004)
  - Total: 5,734
- Time zone: UTC+3

Al Ghasham Al-Malajm (Arabic: آل غشام الملاجم) is a sub-district located in the Al Malagim District, Al Bayda Governorate, Yemen. Al Ghasham Al-Malajm had a population of 5734 according to the 2004 census.
