= Al-Kharbah =

Al-Kharbah الخربة
- Sub-district
- Country: Yemen
- Governorate: Al Bayda
- District: At Taffah

Population (2004)
  - Total: 829
- Time zone: UTC+3

Al-Kharbah (Arabic: الخربة) is a sub-district located in At Taffah District, Al Bayda Governorate, Yemen. Al-Kharbah had a population of 829 according to the 2004 census.
