= Madhwaqin =

Madhwaqin مذوقين
- Sub-district
- Country: Yemen
- Governorate: Al Bayda
- District: Al Bayda District

Population (2004)
  - Total: 3,988
- Time zone: UTC+3

Madhwaqin (Arabic: مذوقين) is a sub-district located in the Al Bayda District, Al Bayda Governorate, Yemen. Madhwaqin had a population of 3988 according to the 2004 census.
