= Dhi Khair =

Dhi Khair ذي خير
- Sub-district
- Country: Yemen
- Governorate: Al Bayda
- District: Al Malagim

Population (2004)
  - Total: 4,183
- Time zone: UTC+3

Dhi Khair (Arabic: ذي خير) is a sub-district located in the Al Malagim District, Al Bayda Governorate, Yemen. Dhi Khair had a population of 4183 according to the 2004 census.
