= Awain =

Awain عوين
- Sub-district
- Country: Yemen
- Governorate: Al Bayda
- District: As Sawma'ah

Population (2004)
  - Total: 6,707
- Time zone: UTC+3

Awain (Arabic: عوين) is a sub-district located in As Sawma'ah District, Al Bayda Governorate, Yemen. Awain had a population of 6707 according to the 2004 census.
