= Al-Rashadah =

Al-Rashadah الرشدة
- Sub-district
- Country: Yemen
- Governorate: Al Bayda
- District: Al Malagim

Population (2004)
  - Total: 5,244
- Time zone: UTC+3

Al-Rashadah (Arabic: الرشدة) is a sub-district located in the Al Malagim District, Al Bayda Governorate, Yemen. Al-Rashadah had a population of 5244 according to the 2004 census.
