= Al-Rawda, Yemen =

Al-Rawda
- Village
- Location within Yemen
- Coordinates: 13.96802°N 45.47992°E
- Country: Yemen
- District: Al Bayda District
- Governorate: Al Bayda Governorate

Population (2014)
  - Total: 677
- Time zone: UTC+3 (AST)
  - Summer (DST): AST

Al-Rawda (Arabic: الروضة) is a village in Al Bayda District (Arabic: البيضا), Al Bayda Governorate, Yemen.

According to the 2004 Yemen Census, the population of the village was 504. In 2014, the population of the village reached 677.
