= November 2010 Yemen bombings =

Suicide bombings

- Part of the al-Qaeda insurgency in Yemen and the Houthi insurgency
- Districts where the bombings occurred
- Location: Al-Jawf Governorate and Saada Governorate, Yemen
- Date: 24–26 November 2010
- Target: Houthi members and supporters
- Attack type: Car bombings; suicide bombings
- Deaths: 27 (including 2 perpetrators)
- Injuries: 23+
- Perpetrator: Al-Qaeda in the Arabian Peninsula
- Assailants: Abu Aisha al-Sanaani al-Hashimi †; Abu Abdullah al-Sanaani †
- Motive: Anti-Shi'ism

In November 2010, two suicide bombings in northern Yemen targeted gatherings of the Houthis, a Zaydi Shia Islamic rebel group, and their supporters. The first bombing took place on 24 November, when a car bomb was detonated near a convoy in al-Jawf Governorate heading to an Eid al-Ghadir celebration, killing 23 people. Two days later, another car bombing in Saada Governorate struck a convoy heading to a funeral for the father of the Houthis' leader, Badreddin al-Houthi, killing two people.

Al-Qaeda in the Arabian Peninsula (AQAP) claimed responsibility for the bombings, framing them as acts of defense in the face of alleged Sunni persecution by the Houthis and vowing further attacks. It later clarified that it distinguished between the Houthis, labeled followers of Shi'ism imported from Iran, and ordinary followers of the native Zaydism who were not targeted.

The Houthis conducted an investigation into the bombings independent of the Yemeni government. Security procedures and actions they implemented after the bombings inflamed Sunni–Shia tensions in areas under their control. The group condemned the bombings as did the government. Analysts noted it was the first sectarian terrorist attack in Yemen, prompting fears of a wider conflict. AQAP later distinguishing between the Houthis and other Zaydis was seen as a response to the lack of endorsement of such violence in Yemen.

== Background ==
The insurgency in Yemen waged by al-Qaeda in the Arabian Peninsula (AQAP) had been intensifying throughout 2010. The Sunni Islamic extremist group espoused hostility to Shia Islam in its rhetoric but had not attacked any Shiites in Yemen until the bombings, instead focusing on foreign and state targets in the capital and in southern Yemen.

Zaydism is a branch of Shia Islam which is distinct from Twelver Shiism practiced in Iran and is considered closer to the Shafi'i school of Sunni Islam. Zaydis constitute the majority of Muslims in northern Yemen but are otherwise outnumbered by Sunnis in the rest of the country. The Houthis, a Yemeni militant group which adheres to Zaydism, had intermittently fought the government and pro-government Sunni tribes for years in a long running insurgency until a ceasefire took hold in February 2010. The group's support base are principally Zaydis, northern regions including Saada Governorate and western al-Jawf Governorate constituting their major strongholds.

Despite government accusations of collusion, relations between AQAP and the Houthis were historically cold, both groups focusing on their own conflicts rather than engaging with one another. Previous bombing incidents in Houthi territory had been initially attributed to al-Qaeda before being proven false, but Gregory D. Johnsen described rising hostility between the groups in recent times. Two AQAP members in Saada were captured by the Houthis and transferred to government custody in September, while Houthi leader Abdul-Malik al-Houthi later called on his fighters to crack down on AQAP presence in al-Jawf.

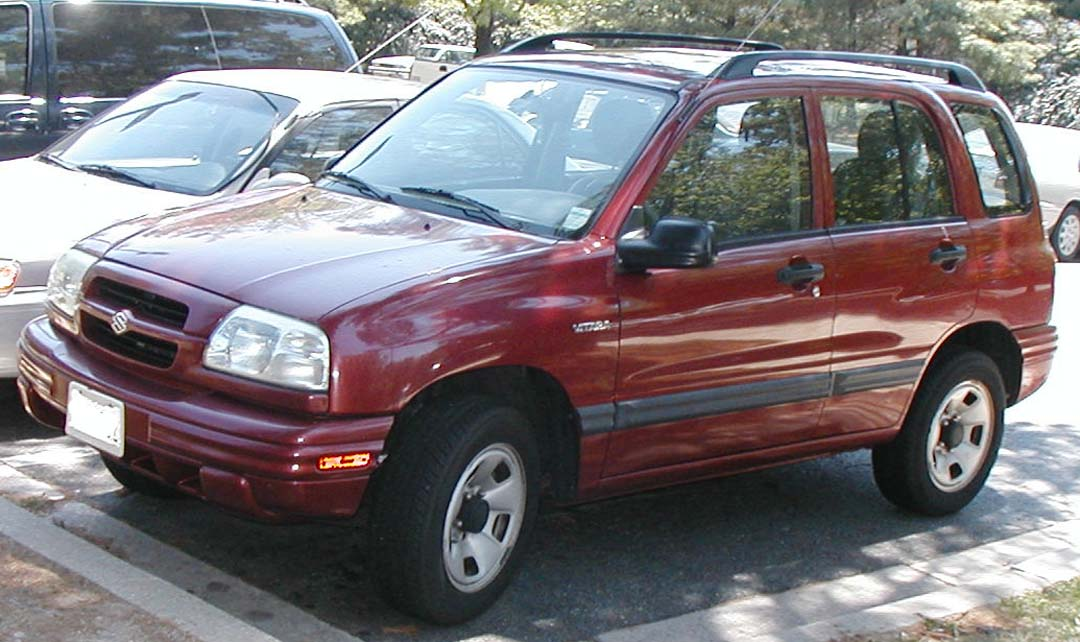
Both bombings were carried out using a Suzuki Vitara (pictured) laden with explosives

== Bombings ==
=== 24 November ===
On 24 November 2010, a suicide bomber detonated an explosive-laden Suzuki Vitara near a Shiite convoy traveling through al-Maton district, al-Jawf Governorate. The victims were heading to the town of al-Zahir to partake in celebrations of Eid al-Ghadir, a Shiite occasion marking the day they believe Prophet Muhammad announced Ali ibn Abi Talib as his successor, a sentiment disputed by Sunnis. The bombing killed 23 people, all of them Shiites and either supporters or official members of the Houthis according to local tribal leaders. At least 15 people were also reportedly injured. Among those killed included local tribal chief Hussein bin Ahmed bin Hadhban and his son, as well as senior Shiite cleric Hamod Derhim al-Ezzi.

=== 26 November ===
Another suicide attack against a Shiite convoy occurred in al-Humaidan, Sahar district, Saada Governorate, early on 26 November. The victims were Marib tribesmen heading from the city of Saada to nearby Dahyan to attend the funeral of Badreddin al-Houthi, a Zaydi cleric and the father of the Houthis leader, who died on 25 November from natural causes. The target of the attack was Houthi-allied tribal sheikh Mubarak al-Mashan al-Zaidi. The convoy of around 30 vehicle had "tight security" but was nonetheless attacked by a militant who detonated a car bomb, killing two people and injuring eight. He reportedly utilized a Suzuki Vitara just as the first bomber did. The state-ran Saba News Agency reported that security personnel stopped the vehicle before it could intercept the procession, partially foiling the attack and limiting the casualties.

== Responsibility ==
A statement from AQAP dated to 25 November, which surfaced digitally on 28 November, claimed responsibility for the bombings. They were portrayed as a response to the killing and displacement of Sunnis by the Houthis, labeled apostates and Iranian proxies, in the face of inaction from Yemen and Saudi Arabia. Warning that the Houthis would do "what they did to the Sunnis in Iraq and Afghanistan", AQAP declared them legitimate targets and announced the formation of specialized units for furthers attacks, urging Sunnis to join.

Another statement released on 3 December provided further details on the bombings and the names of the assailants—Abu Aisha al-Sanaani al-Hashimi and Abu Abdullah al-Sanaani—implying they were Yemenis according to their kunyas. It accused the Houthis of coordinating with the Central Intelligence Agency and alleged that Badreddin al-Houthi was among those killed in the first bombing, his death to natural causes a fabrication. Houthi spokesperson Saleh Habra denied these claims and stated that al-Houthi had died in his house.

A later mention of the attacks in group's e-magazine Inspire said: "We would like to state that our war is with the Rafidha [Rejectionist] Shi'a sect which is alien to Yemen and was only imported recently from Iran, and not with the Zaydi Shi'a sect which is considered to be the closest sect of Shi'a to ahl as-sunnah."

== Aftermath ==
Al-Jawf governor Hussein Hazem said the remains of those killed in the first bombing were taken to the victims' families before the government could initiate an investigation. The Houthis cordoned off al-Humaidan after second bombing and prevented others from entering the site. Checkpoints were established and vehicle searches were conducted by the Houthis in al-Jawf and Saada governorates.

Houthi information bureau official Dhaifullah al-Shami said the group conducted their own investigation without input from authorities, and accused United States ambassador to Yemen Gerald Feierstein of secretly bankrolling the attackers through tribal sheikhs he met with during a visit to Amran Governorate. The US embassy in Sanaa rejected the allegations as "absolutely ridiculous and baseless."

Sectarian tensions rose in al-Jawf, Saada, and Amran governorates as the Houthis launched crackdowns after the bombing. Multiple Sunni scholars were detained in a Salafi-dominated village in Majz district, Saada, including an individual from Iman University accused of involvement in the second bombing. A checkpoint in Harf Sufyan district, Amran, was the site of deadly clashes between the Houthis and followers of Sunni cleric Majdaddin al-Moidi.

== Reactions ==
A statement from the Houthis labeled the bombings an attempt to ferment ethnic and religious strife in Yemen, urging all political and social factions to condemn it. Houthi spokespersons linked the intelligence services of the United States and Israel to the bombings, in line with the groups rhetoric labeling AQAP a tool for US interests while also sidestepping potential sectarian rhetoric or perceptions as a US ally against AQAP. The Yemeni government issued a statement condemning the attacks and pledging to hold the perpetrators accountable, but its response was otherwise muted. Amnesty International released a statement condemning it as "aiming to inflame tensions in Yemen’s conflict-ridden northern regions" and a violation of international law. A member of the Yemen's Peachers' Syndicate condemned the bombings and sectarianism, and noted that some preachers drew attention to the attacks in their Friday khutbah's.

== Analysis ==
Sanaa University professor Murad al-Azzany called the attack "a critical development in Yemen's political and security context". Rafid Fadhil Ali of Terrorism Monitor cited them as evidence of AQAP having established a presence in Houthi-dominated areas. It noted potential AQAP interests in gaining the allegiance of local anti-Houthi Sunni tribes, and that many border crossings needed for AQAP to operate across Yemen and Saudi Arabia are controlled by the Houthis.

Commentators noted similarities with sectarian attacks waged by al-Qaeda in Iraq and in Afghanistan. The usage of a car bomb to attack a domestic civilian target was unprecedented in the country. Analyst Brian O'Neill argued this was intended to attract foreign jihadists. L.E. Picard of the Yemen Peace Project believed the bombings would amount to a strategic misstep by AQAP, eroding their Yemeni support base which generally would not approve of sectarian violence. She bevelied the statements assumed their audience was sympathetic to anti-Shia violence, and viewed the subsequent clarification regarding the Houthis and Zaydis in general as acknowledgement of their error.

Princeton University scholar Gregory D. Johnsen warned the bombing could reignite the conflict in northern Yemen with the added belligerence of AQAP, and would likely draw in the government. According to Ali, clashes between the two would be in the interests of the government, but allowing AQAP to draw support from Sunnis in a sectarian conflict would not. Abdul-Malik al-Houthi did not signal intentions to respond to the bombings, likely to avoid a conflict with AQAP drawing the Houthis into foreign territory further south. Despite AQAP declaring war on the Houthis in 2011, attacks and direct engagements were scant—the bombings remained their most significant hostilities prior to the Yemeni civil war.
