= Al Miqdhab =

Al Miqdhab in Arabic المقضاب is a chain of several villages in As Sawma'ah District, east of Al Bayda, Yemen.
