= Letta Tayler =

American former journalist and researcher (born 1958–1959)

- Born: 1958 or 1959 (age 66–67)
- Citizenship: United States
- Education: Barnard College (BA); University of Oxford (MA)
- Occupations: Researcher; journalist (former)
- Employers: Newsday (1980s–2008); Human Rights Watch (2008–present)

Letta M. Tayler (born 1958–1959) is an American researcher and former journalist. Originally a music journalist, Tayler later shifted to foreign correspondence for Newsday and covered the war on terror. She later joined Human Rights Watch as an researcher on terrorism and counterterrorism, and served as associate director for its Crisis and Conflict Division.

== Early life and journalism ==
Born in 1958 or 1959, (Note: She was 57 as of 2016.) Tayler is an American and holds a bachelor's degree in political science from Barnard College and a master's degree in international human rights law from the University of Oxford. She moved to Rome, Italy, in 1980 and later took up work as a freelance journalist. Tayler wrote for the American newspaper Newsday since at least 1989. From 1996 to 2001 she was a rock music critic while also writing more generally on popular music, having authored profiles on stars such as Lou Reed and Britney Spears.

After the September 11 attacks, Tayler focused on various conflicts during the war on terror. As a foreign correspondent for Newsday, she covered the Battle of Tora Bora during the United States invasion of Afghanistan and was embedded with Marine Fighter Training Squadron 402 during the 2003 invasion of Iraq. She visited Iraq again in 2004 and was among the first journalists to cover the Abu Ghraib torture and prisoner abuse scandal, and reported extensively about Guantanamo Bay detainees afterwards. She worked in over three dozen countries and covered various major events during the 2000s, including the 2004 Indonesian tsunami, the 2005 London bombings, and Barack Obama's 2008 presidential campaign. Her penultimate posting at Newsday was as Latin American bureau chief.

== Research ==
As she continued to report on conflicts, Tayler became more concerned about human rights violations. She joined Human Rights Watch in October 2008 as an researcher in the Terrorism and Counterterrorism Division. She later served as associate director for the Crisis and Conflict Division. Her work primarily focused on human rights violations in conflicts involving al-Qaeda and the Islamic State (IS), including violations by countries fighting these groups.

She was the group's lead researcher in Yemen from February 2011 to February 2013, conducting research on al-Qaeda in the Arabian Peninsula (AQAP) and US intervention against the group. She provided a written testimony to the United States Senate Judiciary Subcommittee on the Constitution regarding target killings in Yemen, focusing on a 2012 strike which killed 12 civilians. Tayler authored a Human Rights Watch report documenting several US missile strikes in Yemen which inflicted civilian casualties, published in 2013 alongside an Amnesty International report on strikes in Pakistan. She also authored a 2014 report about an airstrike which struck a convoy of Yemeni civilian celebrating a wedding.

Tayler was in Iraq from mid-May to June 2014 to document human rights violations in the conflict with IS. Hours after she left Iraq on June 10, IS captured the country's second-largest city Mosul, leading to her returning four days later until July. She continued her research on the ground in Iraq during the war, at one point nearly being struck by a shell. In 2015, she interviewed Yazidi women formerly enslaved by IS, stating they were "some of the hardest testimonies I've ever had to gather". Tayler also documented atrocities committed by IS in Libya during their occupation of Sirte, a city they captured in 2015. In the aftermath of IS' defeat in Iraq and Syria, she has advocated for humane treatment and due process for IS prisoners, and the repatriation of foreign women and children detained at the camps.

In regards to her foreign research, Tayler said: "I sometimes wonder why I take these risks... but when refugees beg me to share their stories to stop the atrocities, all my doubts vanish." She has expressed frustration at slow government responses to her reports at times, but believes they make an impact. Tayler has been featured on BBC, CNN, Fresh Air, Al Jazeera, and Democracy Now!, quoted by The New York Times, The Washington Post, and NPR, and has written for The Washington Post, Foreign Affairs, Foreign Policy, The Atlantic, The Guardian, and Just Security, among other media outlets. She has briefed the United Nations' High-Level Conference on Counter-Terrorism and the Human Rights Council, the European Parliament, and Organization for Security and Co-operation in Europe, and officials from multiple countries. As of 2025, she is a member in the Legislative Frameworks working group of the Global Internet Forum to Counter Terrorism.
