= Al-Hijra, Maswarah =

Al-Hijra (Maswarah) is one of the villages that falls in the Maswarah District in Al Bayda Governorate. According to the census of 2004 done by the government in Yemen, the population of the village is 37.
