= Al Bayda City district =

- District
- Location in Yemen
- Coordinates: 13.9847°N 45.5564°E
- Country: Yemen
- Governorate: Al Bayda

Population (2003)
  - Total: 29,853
- Time zone: UTC+3 (Yemen Standard Time)

Al Bayda City district is a district of the Al Bayda Governorate, Yemen. As of 2003, the district had a population of 29,853 inhabitants.
