= Khubzah =

- Village
- Location in Yemen
- Coordinates: 14°27′32″N 44°47′45″E
- Country: Yemen
- Governorate: Al Bayda Governorate
- Time zone: UTC+3 (Yemen Standard Time)

Khubzah is a village in the Al Bayda Governorate of Yemen.

== History ==
On 11 August 2020, the city was recaptured from Islamic State by Houthi movement.
