= Al-Zahir, Yemen =

Al-Zahir الزاهر
- Sub-district
- Country: Yemen
- Governorate: Al Bayda
- District: Az Zahir

Population (2004)
  - Total: 7,939
- Time zone: UTC+3

Al-Zahir (Arabic: الزاهر) is a sub-district located in Az Zahir District, Al Bayda Governorate, Yemen. Al-Zahir had a population of 7939 according to the 2004 census.
