= Mukayras district =

Coordinates: 14.0319°N 45.7964°E

Mukayras District
- District
- Interactive map of Mukayras District
- Country: Yemen
- Governorate: Al Bayda

Population (2003)
  - Total: 41,515
- Time zone: UTC+3 (Yemen Standard Time)

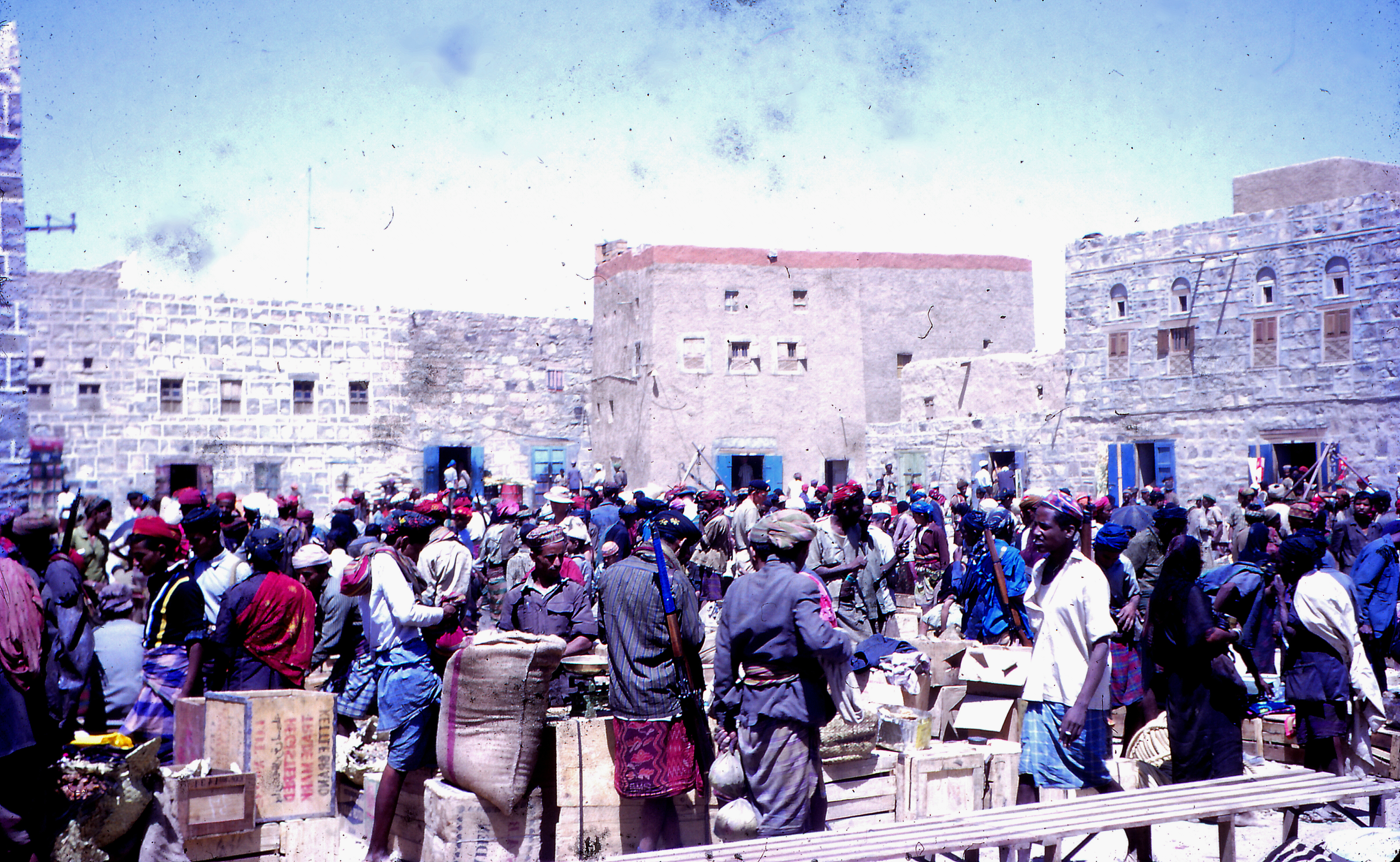
Souq in Mukayras, 1966

Mukayras District is a district of the Al Bayda Governorate, Yemen. As of 2003, the district had a population of 41,515 inhabitants.
