= Hooria Mashhour =

Yemeni human rights and women's rights activist (born 1954)

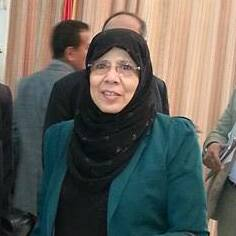

Minister of Human Rights
- In office 7 December 2011 – November 2014
- President: Abdrabbuh Mansur Hadi
- Prime Minister: Mohammed Basindawa

Personal details
- Born: 1954 (age 71–72)

Hooria Mashhour (Arabic: حورية مشهور أحمد; born 1954) is a Yemeni human rights and women's rights activist. She campaigned against child marriage in Yemen and is an advocate of transitional justice. She held the position of Minister of Human Rights in post-revolution Yemen, starting in 2012. Due to safety concerns, she left the position in 2014. Hooria remains active today promoting peace through negotiation and mediation processes; and the inclusion of women in constructing a lasting peace.

== Biography ==
=== Yemen ===
Mahhour was appointed to be the Minister of Human Rights as part of the National Accord Government from 2012-2014. Prior to that, she was appointed as the Official Spokesperson for the National Council for the Peaceful Revolution in 2011. She was the head of the National Women Committee, and after 10 years of experience, she was appointed to be a member of the Truth Investigation Committee to investigate the violent events in Aden. She resigned in 2011 in order to take part in the revolution known as the Arab Spring. She was active in calling for President Ali Abdullah Saleh to face prosecution for his alleged killing of protestors on 18 March 2011 in Yemen's capital city, Sana'a. She went on hunger strike in 2013 to draw attention to the detention of 60 activists. In her capacity as the Minister of Human Rights, she tracked corruption, abuse and detentions which violate human rights and dignity. She also has campaigned to end child marriage in Yemen. pushing parliament to pass a law setting a minimum age for marriage in Yemen. In 2013, she announced legislation to require that the minimum age for women to marry is eighteen years of age.

Mashhour has spoken out against drone attacks and bombings carried out by the United States and Saudi Arabia against Yemen during her time as minister. She sought to shed light on the civilian impact of these strikes and has said that "To have an innocent person fall, this is a major breach." She has written out against these attacks in The Washington Post, drawing attention to individuals who have been affected by the violence. Following the Houthi coup and subsequent control of the capital Sana'a in 2014, Mashhour's safety was at risk, so she moved to Aden and left the position of Minister of Human Rights. Ezzedine al-Asbahi was appointed to take her place in 2015.

=== Germany ===
The conflict in Yemen forced Mashoor to flee to Germany. In 2020, she called for inclusion of women in government, stating that without women, no government has legitimacy.

== Academic work ==
Mashoor is an advocate for the role of women in Yemeni society, having spoken at many events about the historical role of women during the 10th, 11th, and 12th centuries AD.

== See also ==
- Politics of Yemen
- Yemeni Crisis (2011–present)
- Arabs in Germany
- Asylum in Germany

Political offices
Preceded by None	Ministry of Human Rights (Yemen); 2012–2014	Vacant Title next held by Ezzedine Al Asbahi
