= Baraa Shiban =

Yemeni activist from Shiban

Baraa Shiban is a Yemeni activist from Shiban. Shiban is a volunteer for the organisation Reprieve. He has looked into of the United States drones attacks in Yemen.

Shiban was nominated to the Wikipedia Board of Directors in 2015. He was the first Yemeni to be nominated for the Nobel Peace Prize.

Baraa studied business administration, and was involved with several organizations in Yemen from 2006 to 2011.

In September 2013 Shiban was detained at Gatwick Airport under Schedule 7 of the Terrorism Act 2000, after his arrival in the United Kingdom to speak at an event at Chatham House. Shiban was questioned for an hour and a half about his political views and his work for Reprieve. When Shiban objected to officials that his views had no relation to security concerns, the officials threatened to detain him for the maximum nine hours permitted under the act.

Shiban had previously visited the UK without incident during 2013.
