= Sabah district =

Coordinates: 14.2758°N 44.6700°E

Sabah District مديرية صباح
- District
- Interactive map of Sabah District
- Country: Yemen
- Governorate: Al Bayda

Government

Population (2003)
  - Total: 27,472
- Time zone: UTC+3 (Yemen Standard Time)

Sabah District (Arabic: مديرية صباح) is a district of the Al Bayda Governorate, Yemen. As of 2003, the district had a population of 27,472 inhabitants.
