= Wald Rabi' district =

Coordinates: 14.5556°N 44.9058°E

Wald Rabi' District
- District
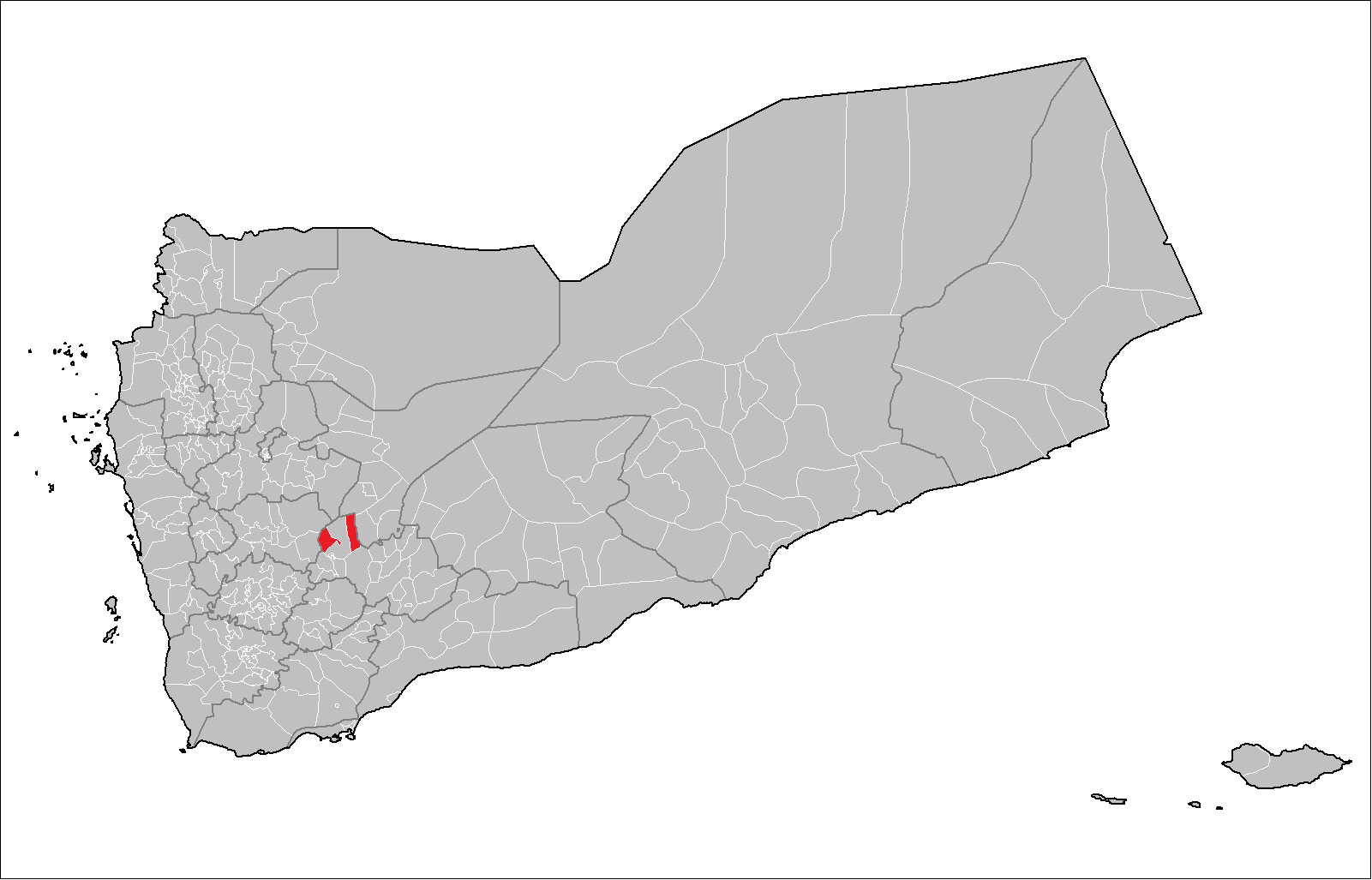
- Country: Yemen
- Governorate: Al Bayda

Population (2003)
  - Total: 19,427
- Time zone: UTC+3 (Yemen Standard Time)

Wald Rabi' District is a district of the Al Bayda Governorate, Yemen. As of 2003, the district had a population of 19,427 inhabitants.

It is the only district in the Al Bayda Governorate which is not contiguous.
