= Al Arsh district =

Al Arsh district مُدِيْرِيَّة ٱلْعَرْش (in Arabic)
- District
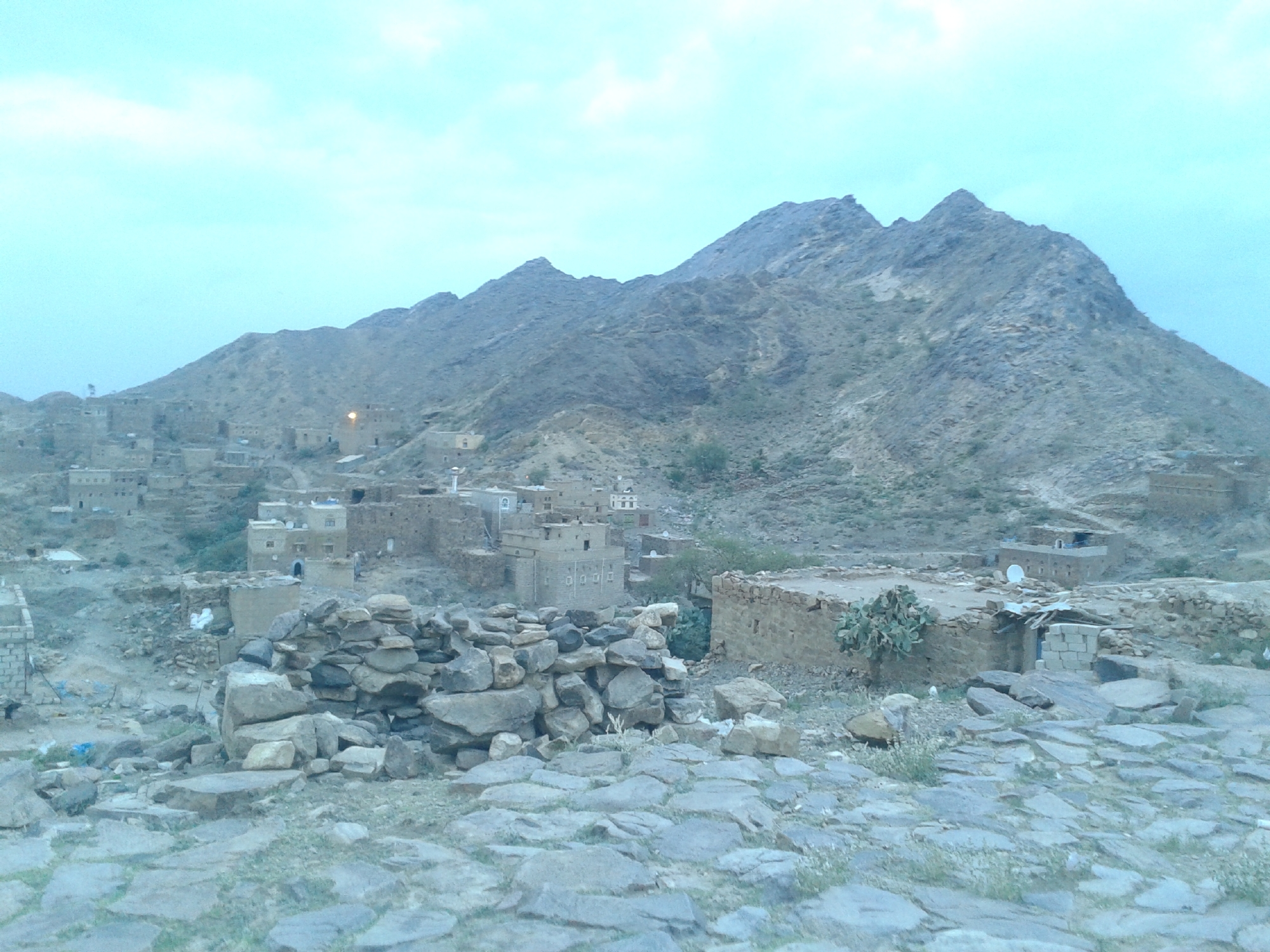
- Al-Khadra, Rada', Al-Bayda'
- Interactive map of Al Arsh district
- Coordinates: 14°24′N 44°42′E
- Country: Yemen
- Governorate: Al Bayda

Population (2003)
  - Total: 45,773
- Time zone: UTC+3 (Yemen Standard Time)

Al Arsh district (Arabic: مُدِيْرِيَّة ٱلْعَرْش, romanized: Mudīriyyat Al-‘Arsh) is a district of the Al Bayda Governorate, Yemen. As of 2003, the district had a population of 45,773 inhabitants.
