= Radda district =

Rada'a district مُدِيْرِيَّة رَدَاع
- District
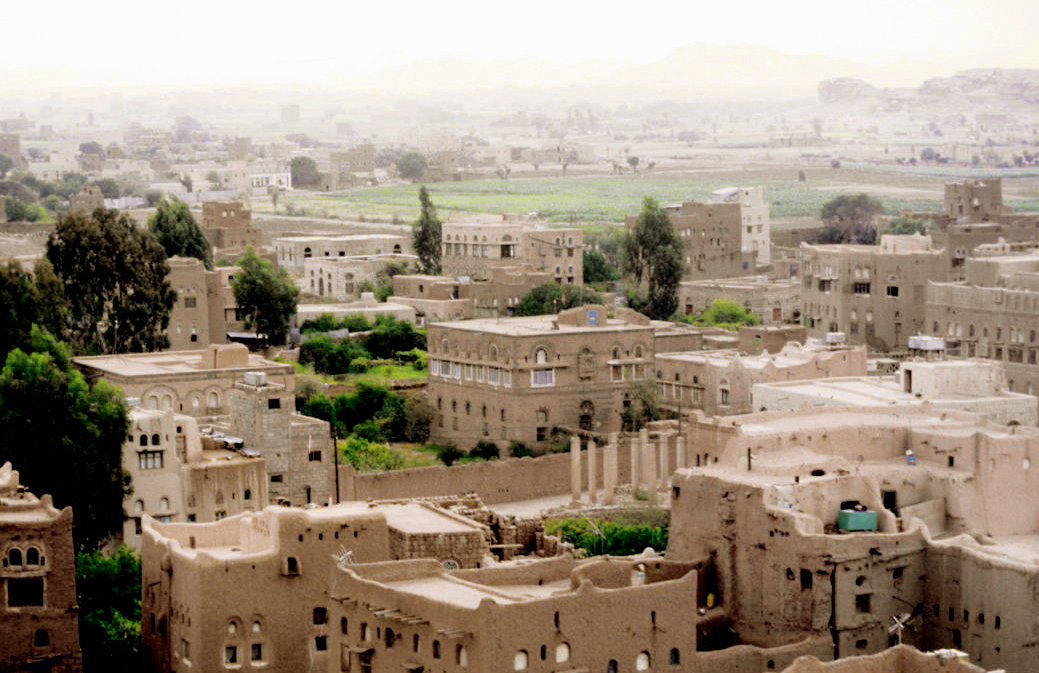
- Interactive map of Rada'a district
- Coordinates: 14.339995°N 44.908741°E
- Country: Yemen
- Governorate: Al Bayda

Area
  - Total: 224 km^{2} (86 sq mi)
- Elevation: 2,251 m (7,385 ft)

Population (2004)
  - Total: 56,382
- Time zone: UTC+3 (Yemen Standard Time)

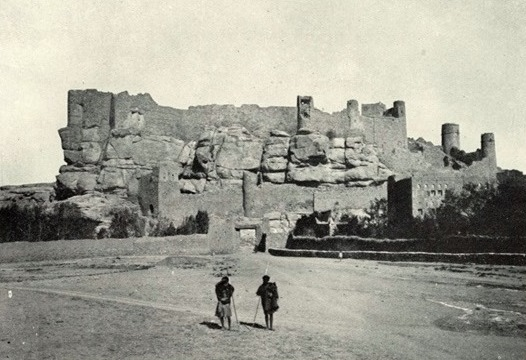
City of Rada'a in 1909

Rada'a district (Arabic: مُدِيْرِيَّة رَدَاع) is a district of the Al Bayda Governorate, Yemen. As of 2003, the district had a population of 56,382 inhabitants. The district's largest city is Rada'a, 49 kilometres (30 mi) east of Dhamar, a city renowned for its 16th-century ‘Amiryia Madrasa and mosque.

== Climate ==
Climate data for Rada'a
Month	Jan	Feb	Mar	Apr	May	Jun	Jul	Aug	Sep	Oct	Nov	Dec	Year
Mean daily maximum °C (°F)	21.4 (70.5)	22.7 (72.9)	24.9 (76.8)	25.4 (77.7)	27.2 (81.0)	29.1 (84.4)	27.3 (81.1)	26.2 (79.2)	26.2 (79.2)	24.8 (76.6)	22.0 (71.6)	21.5 (70.7)	24.9 (76.8)
Daily mean °C (°F)	12.9 (55.2)	13.7 (56.7)	16.5 (61.7)	17.5 (63.5)	19.5 (67.1)	20.7 (69.3)	21.0 (69.8)	20.1 (68.2)	19.2 (66.6)	17.3 (63.1)	14.7 (58.5)	13.7 (56.7)	17.2 (63.0)
Mean daily minimum °C (°F)	4.4 (39.9)	4.7 (40.5)	8.1 (46.6)	9.7 (49.5)	11.8 (53.2)	12.3 (54.1)	14.7 (58.5)	14.0 (57.2)	12.2 (54.0)	9.8 (49.6)	7.5 (45.5)	5.9 (42.6)	9.6 (49.3)
Average precipitation mm (inches)	6 (0.2)	6 (0.2)	11 (0.4)	36 (1.4)	39 (1.5)	11 (0.4)	72 (2.8)	103 (4.1)	30 (1.2)	4 (0.2)	5 (0.2)	1 (0.0)	324 (12.6)
Source: Climate-Data.org
