= Ash Sharyah district =

Coordinates: 16.0000°N 43.3331°E

Ash Sharyah District
- District
- Interactive map of Ash Sharyah District
- Country: Yemen
- Governorate: Al Bayda

Population (2003)
  - Total: 33,873
- Time zone: UTC+3 (Yemen Standard Time)

Ash Sharyah District is a district of the Al Bayda Governorate, Yemen. As of 2003, the district had a population of 33,873 inhabitants.
