= Al Quraishyah district =

Al Quraishyah District
- District
- Interactive map of Al Quraishyah District
- Coordinates: 14.6050°N 44.8894°E
- Country: Yemen
- Governorate: Al Bayda

Population (2003)
  - Total: 29,525
- Time zone: UTC+3 (Yemen Standard Time)

Al Quraishyah District (Arabic: مديرية القريشية) is a district of the Al Bayda Governorate, Yemen. As of 2003, the district had a population of 29,525 inhabitants.
