= Ar Ryashyyah district =

Coordinates: 14.2422°N 44.7753°E

Ar Ryashyyah District
- District
- Interactive map of Ar Ryashyyah District
- Country: Yemen
- Governorate: Al Bayda

Population (2003)
  - Total: 22,842
- Time zone: UTC+3 (Yemen Standard Time)

Ar Ryashyyah District is a district of the Al Bayda Governorate, Yemen. As of 2003, the district had a population of 22,842 inhabitants.
