= Al Malagim district =

Coordinates: 14.3653°N 45.3850°E

Al Malagim District مديرية الملاجم
- District
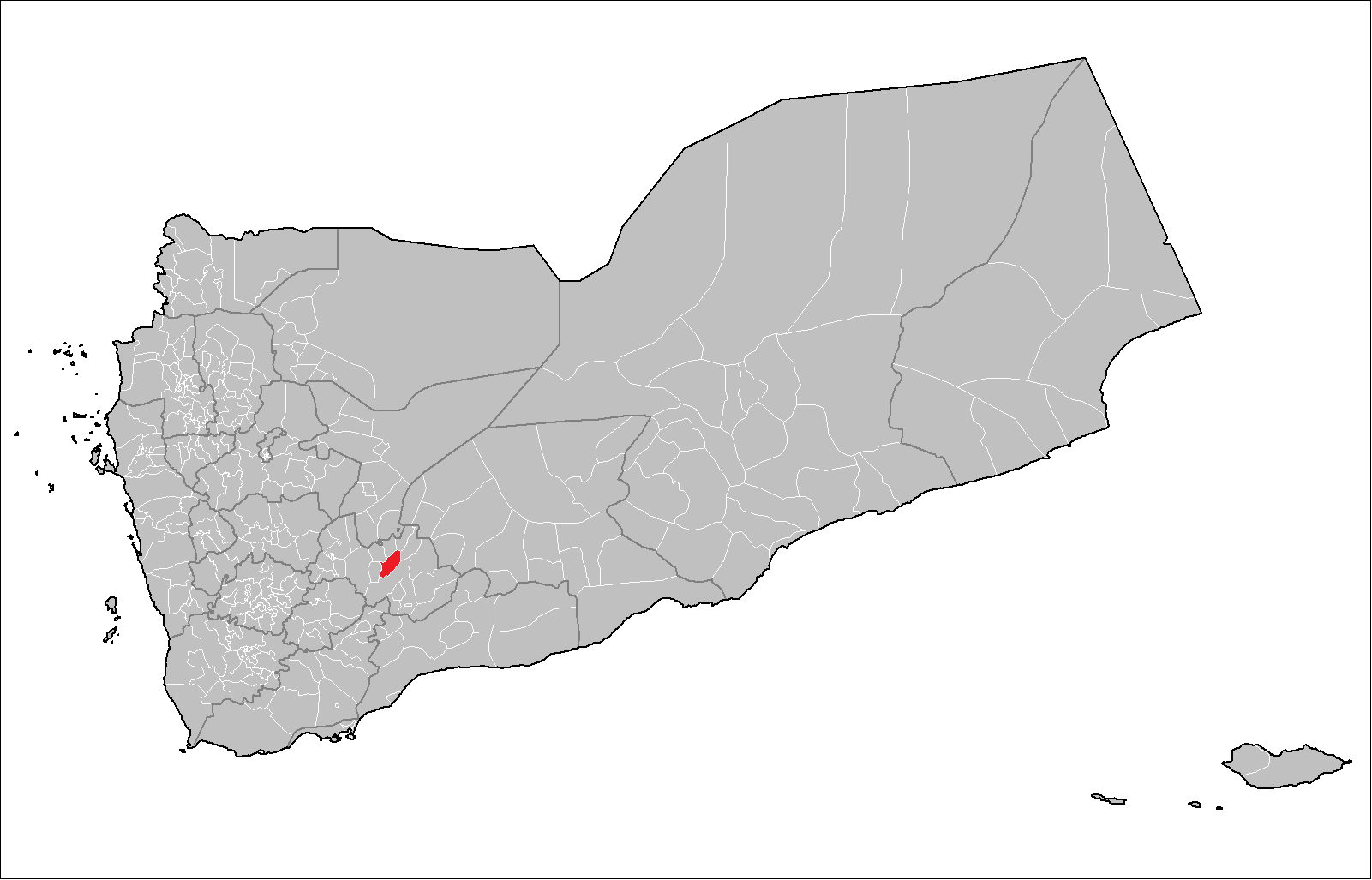
- Country: Yemen
- Governorate: Al Bayda

Population (2003)
  - Total: 29,573
- Time zone: UTC+3 (Yemen Standard Time)

Al Malagim District (Arabic: مديرية الملاجم) is a district of the Al Bayda Governorate in Yemen. As of 2003, the district had a population of 29,573 inhabitants.
