= Az Zahir district =

Az Zahir District
- District
- Location within Yemen
- Coordinates: 13.964546°N 45.465212°E
- Country: Yemen
- Governorate: Al Bayda

Population (2003)
  - Total: 25,704
- Time zone: UTC+3 (Yemen Standard Time)

Az Zahir District is a district of the Al Bayda Governorate, Yemen. As of 2003 the district had a population of 25,704 inhabitants.
