= Maswarah district =

Coordinates: 14.4025°N 45.7031°E

Maswarah District
- District
- Interactive map of Maswarah District
- Country: Yemen
- Governorate: Al Bayda

Population (2003)
  - Total: 7,038
- Time zone: UTC+3 (Yemen Standard Time)

Maswarah District is a district of the Al Bayda Governorate, Yemen. As of 2003, the district had a population of 7,038 inhabitants.

== Localities ==
- Al-Hijra
