= Dhi Na'im district =

Coordinates: 14.1108°N 45.4642°E

Dhi Na'im District
- District
- Interactive map of Dhi Na'im District
- Country: Yemen
- Governorate: Al Bayda

Population (2003)
  - Total: 25,759
- Time zone: UTC+3 (Yemen Standard Time)

Dhi Na'im District is a district of the Al Bayda Governorate, Yemen. As of 2003, the district had a population of 25,759 inhabitants.
