= As Sawadiyah district =

Coordinates: 14.4519°N 45.3697°E

As Sawadiyah District
- District
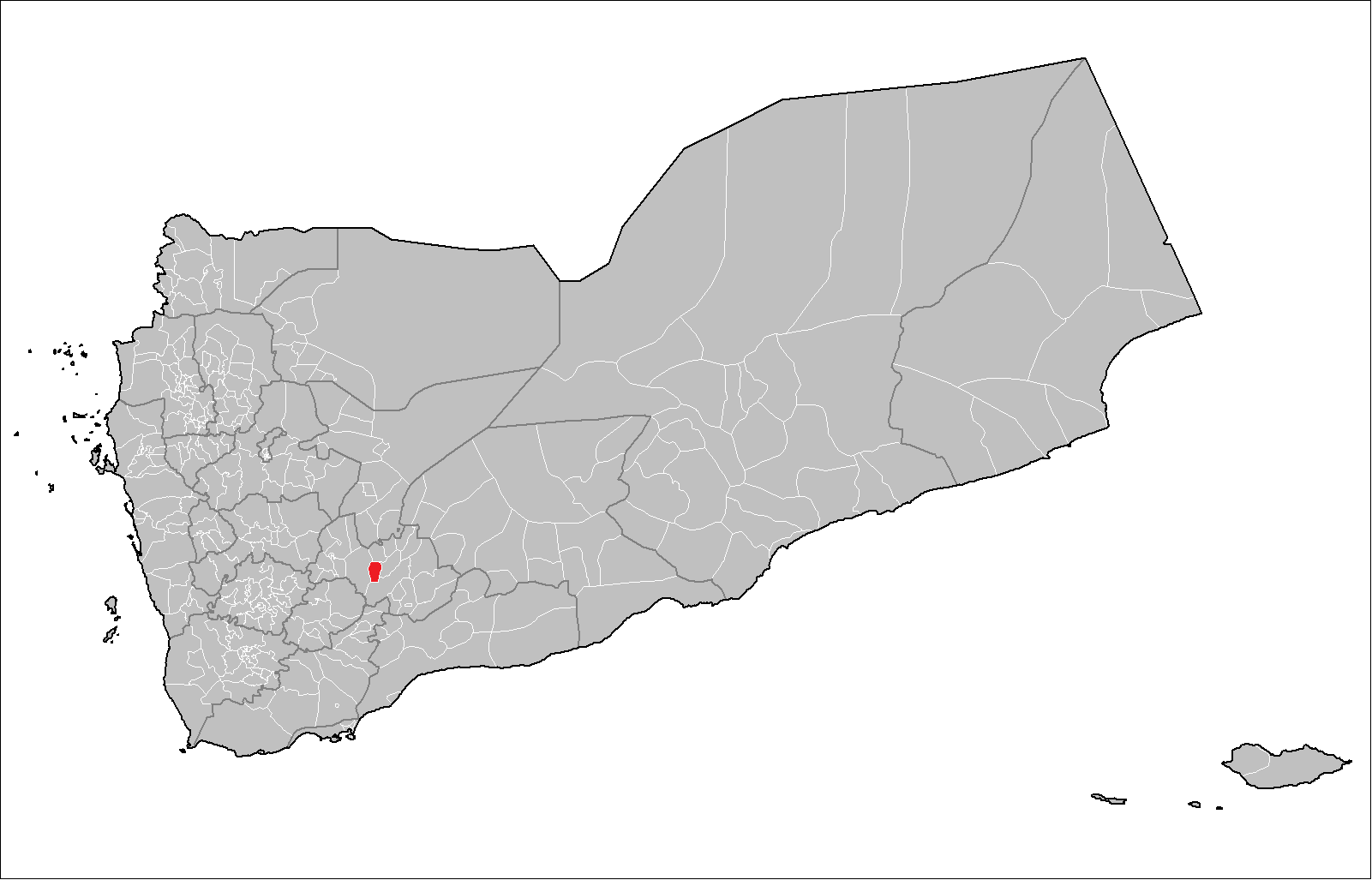
- Country: Yemen
- Governorate: Al Bayda

Population (2003)
  - Total: 26,763
- Time zone: UTC+3 (Yemen Standard Time)

As Sawadiyah District is a district of the Al Bayda Governorate, Yemen. As of 2003, the district had a population of 26,763 inhabitants.
