= Na'man district =

Coordinates: 14.5939°N 45.5283°E

Na'man District
- District
- Interactive map of Na'man District
- Country: Yemen
- Governorate: Al Bayda
- Control: (Islamic State) Islamic Emirate of Yemen

Population (2003)
  - Total: 9,252
- Time zone: UTC+3 (Yemen Standard Time)

Na'man District is a district of the Al Bayda Governorate, Yemen. As of 2003, the district had a population of 9,252 inhabitants.
