= Al Bayda district =

Al Bayda district مُدِيْرِيَّة ٱلْبَيْضَاء
- District
- Location in Yemen
- Coordinates: 13°56′0″N 45°33′0″E
- Country: Yemen
- Governorate: Al Bayda

Population (2003)
  - Total: 40,289
- Time zone: UTC+3 (Yemen Standard Time)

Al Bayda district (Arabic: مُدِيْرِيَّة ٱلْبَيْضَاء) is a district of the Al Bayda Governorate, Yemen. As of 2003, the district had a population of 40,289 inhabitants.

Villages include Al-Rawda.
