= Radman Al Awad district =

Coordinates: 14.4833°N 45.2742°E

Radman Al Awad District
- District
- مديرية ردمان
- Interactive map of Radman Al Awad District
- Country: Yemen
- Governorate: Al Bayda

Population (2003)
  - Total: 20,150
- Time zone: UTC+3 (Yemen Standard Time)

Radman Al Awad District is a district of the Al Bayda Governorate, Yemen. As of 2003, the district had a population of 20,150 inhabitants.
