= At Taffah district =

Coordinates: 14.1981°N 45.3581°E

At Taffah District
- District
- Interactive map of At Taffah District
- Country: Yemen
- Governorate: Al Bayda

Population (2003)
  - Total: 27,692
- Time zone: UTC+3 (Yemen Standard Time)

At Taffah District is a district of the Al Bayda Governorate, Yemen. As of 2003, the district had a population of 27,692 inhabitants.
