= Nati' district =

Coordinates: 14.5539°N 45.5850°E

Nati' District مديرية ناطع
- District
- Interactive map of Nati' District
- Country: Yemen
- Governorate: Al Bayda

Population (2003)
  - Total: 13,604
- Time zone: UTC+3 (Yemen Standard Time)

Nati' District (Arabic: مديرية ناطع) is a district of the Al Bayda Governorate, Yemen. As of 2003, the district had a population of 13,604 inhabitants.
