= As Sawma'ah district =

Coordinates: 14.1667°N 45.8308°E

As Sawma'ah District
- District
- Interactive map of As Sawma'ah District
- Country: Yemen
- Governorate: Al Bayda

Population (2003)
  - Total: 44,873
- Time zone: UTC+3 (Yemen Standard Time)

As Sawma'ah District is a district of the Al Bayda' Governorate, Yemen. As of 2003, the district had a population of 44,873 inhabitants.

== History ==
In August 2020 Al-Qaeda fighters crucified a doctor in As Sawma'ah. On 15 September 2021 the district center was captured by Houthis.
