= Al-Bayda Governorate =

Governorate of Yemen

Al-Bayda' Governorate محافظة البيضاء
- Governorate
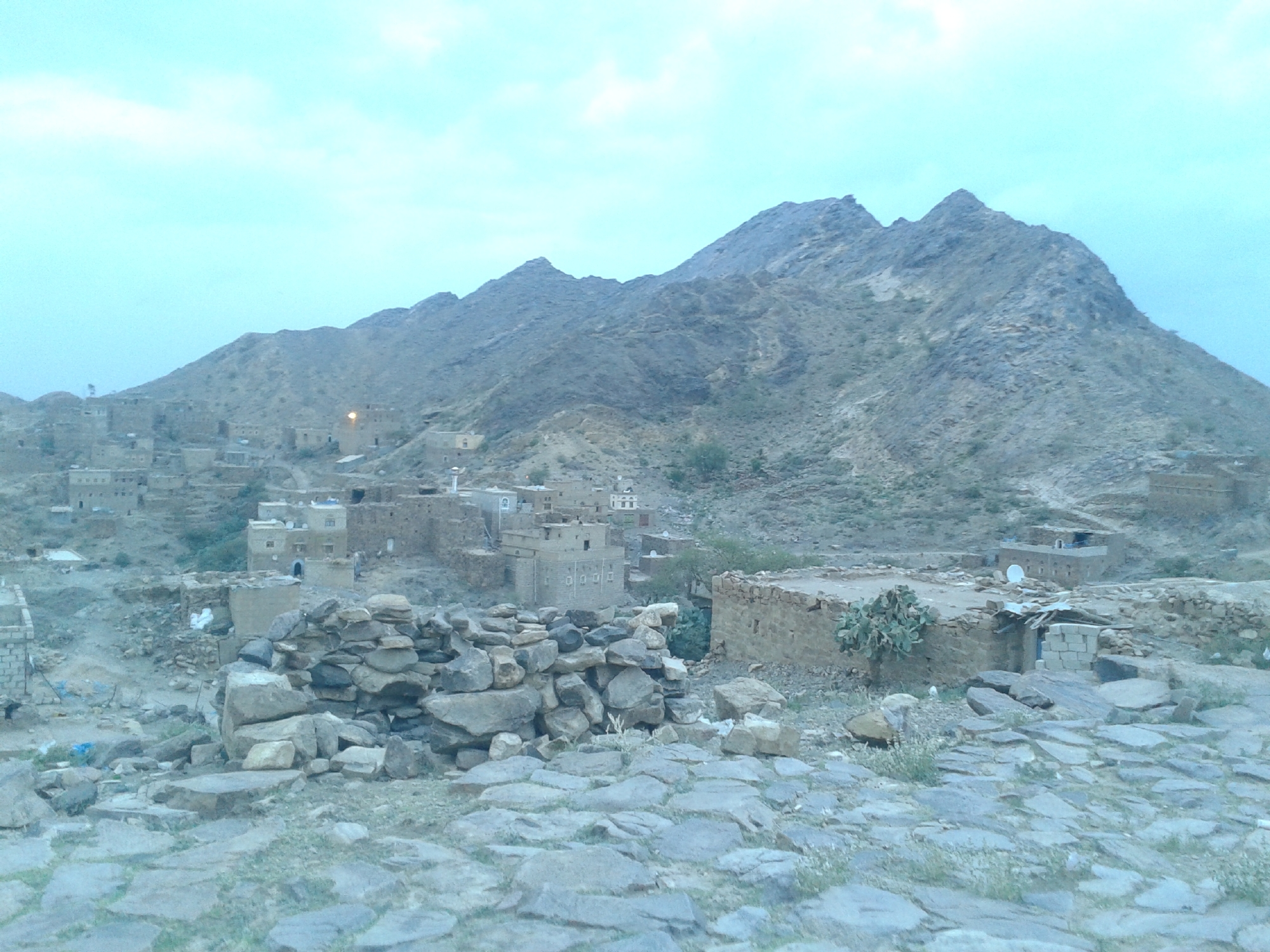
- Al-Khadra, Al A'rsh district, Al-Bayda
- Interactive map of Al-Bayda' Governorate
- Coordinates: 14°16′N 45°20′E
- Country: Yemen
- Region: Sheba Region
- Seat: Al Bayda

Area
  - Total: 9,314 km^{2} (3,596 sq mi)

Population (2025 est.)
  - Total: 823,313
  - Density: 88.40/km^{2} (228.9/sq mi)
- ISO 3166 code: YE-BA

Al Bayda Governorate (Arabic: مُحَافَظَة ٱلْبَيْضَاء Muḥāfaẓat Al-Bayḍāʾ), also spelt Al-Baidhah or Beida, is one of the Governorates of Yemen. Located in the central part of the country, it is approximately 267 km (166 mi) south of the national capital Sana'a. It covers an area of approximately 9,314 km^{2} (3,596 sq mi) and is subdivided into 20 districts. Its capital is Al-Bayda. According to the 2004 census, it had a population of 577,369, and had an estimated population of 823,313 in 2025.

== History ==
The territory of Al-Bayda was ruled by the ancient kingdoms of Saba and Qataban since the eight century BCE. The region's agricultural highlands in the south west were gradually developed and expanded during the Himyarite period from the first century CE. The historic city of Rada'a contains several important monuments, including the Al-Amiriya Mosque and Madrasa founded in 1504 during the reign of the Tahirid dynasty.

During the North Yemen Civil War following the 1962 revolution, local tribal groups participated in the conflict against royalist forces. During the Yemeni civil war (2014–present), Houthi forces expanded into the governorate in 2015, securing control of much of its territory. The governorate subsequently saw fighting between Houthi forces and the government-aligned groups.

== Geography ==
Al-Bayda is one of the governorates of Yemen. It is located in central Yemen, approximately 267 km (166 mi) southeast of the national capital Sana'a. It is bordered by Marib Governorate, Sana'a Governorate, Dhamar Governorate and Ibb Governorate to the north, and Shabwah Governorate, Abyan Governorate, Lahej Governorate and Dhale Governorate to the south. It occupies an area of approximately 9,279 km^{2} (3,583 sq mi) and has its capital at Al-Bayda.

The governorate lies in the Sarawat Mountains region with intertwining valleys. The maximum elevation is 3,174 m (10,414 ft) and the minimum elevation is 690 m (2,250 ft) with an average elevation of 1,714 m (5,623 ft). The geology in the region consists of eroded rocks on exposed basement rocks from the Precambrian period. Deposits of titanium, silica and glass sand have been identified, although these minerals are not mined. The soils of Al Bayda are generally shallow, with the deepest soils occurring on terraced slopes, in valleys, and along wadis.

The climate varies with elevation, with moderate summers and cold winters in the highlands, while the lower and more arid areas experience hotter summers. June is the hottest month with an average temperature of 23.8 °C (74.8 °F) and December is the coldest month with an average temperature of 15.2 °C (59.4 °F). It receives an average annual rainfall of 179 mm (7.0 in) with maximum precipitation occurring in August.

== Administration and sub-divisions ==
Al-Bayda Governorate is administered by a local council consisting of 20 members and the governor. The governorate is divided into 20 districts.

Districts
District	Size (km²)	Population		
District	Size (km²)	Total	Male	Female
Al A'rsh	476	72,223	36,733	35,490
Al Bayda City	306	56,935	28,956	27,979
Al Bayda	476	61,057	31,053	30,004
Al Malagim	306	43,741	22,252	21,489
Al Quraishyah	476	43,019	21,881	21,138
Ar Ryashyyah	476	37,233	18,938	18,295
Ash Sharyah	476	51,153	26,016	25,137
As Sawadiyah	732	36,240	18,431	17,809
As Sawma'ah	957	64,766	32,941	31,825
At Taffah	165	40,027	20,359	19,668
Az Zahir	233	13,366	6,797	6,569
Dhi Na'im	185	32,879	16,724	16,155
Maswarah	751	10,037	5,107	4,930
Mukayras	1,153	48,149	24,490	23,659
Na'man	272	14,842	7,549	7,293
Nati'	348	18,048	9,180	8,868
Radman Al Awad	233	25,491	12,966	12,525
Rada'	306	86,099	43,792	42,307
Sabah	476	41,326	21,017	20,309
Wald Rabi'	476	26,682	13,573	13,109
Total	9,279	823,313	418,755	404,558

Nayef al-Qaysi was the governor of the governorate until 23 July 2017, when he was sacked and replaced by Salah al-Rassass. He was replaced by Naser al Hadr al Swaydi, who was the governor in 2019.

== Demographics ==
According to the 2004 census, Al-Bayda Governorate had a population of 577,369, comprising 285,032 females and 292,337 males. The population was estimated to be 695,000 in 2011. According to a 2025 estimate, its population was approximately 720,901, including 354,240 females and 366,661 males. According to a 2025 estimate, its population was 823,313, comprising 418,755 males and 404,558 females.

== Economy ==
Agriculture is the principal economic activity in Al-Bayda, and it contributes to approximately 2.6% of Yemen's total agricultural output. Major produce include vegetables and cash crops. Qat is a major cash crop, and the governorate is the third largest producer in the country. It produces an indigenous variety known as rada'i. In the mountainous regions, terrace farming is practised with crops grown including millets, maize, and qat. Livestock rearing is another major economic activity in rural communities in the region. Other economic activities include handicrafts, including agricultural tools, janbiyas, textiles, woollen products and silverware. According to the 2014 local authority budget, central government grants and subsidies accounted for approximately 93% of the governorate's general revenue, while locally generated revenues contributed 7%. The poverty rate was estimated at 39.2%.
