= 2014 Southern Yemen offensive =

Military operation against al-Qaeda safe havens in Yemen

- Part of the South Yemen insurgency and the al-Qaeda insurgency in Yemen
- Yemeni soldiers standing by a captured AQAP post in al-Mahfad, 23 May
Date	29 April – 8 May 2014
Location	Abyan and Shabwah governorates
Result	Yemeni victory: Yemeni forces secure AQAP-held areas, including al-Mahfad and Azzan; AQAP withdraws to Hadhramaut Governorate; AQAP recatures most of its territory during the Yemeni civil war

Belligerents
Yemen; Supported by: United States	Al-Qaeda in the Arabian Peninsula

Commanders and leaders
Mohammed Nasser Ahmed (Yemen) Mahmoud al-Subaihi (Yemen) Ahmed Saif al-Yafie (Yemen) Hussein al-Wuhayshi	Nasir al-Wuhayshi; Qasim al-Raymi; Jalal Baleedi; Sa'ad bin Atef al-Awlaki; Ali bin Likra al-Kazimy †; Abu Muslim al-Uzbeki †; Abu Islam al-Shishani †; Abu Ayub al-Jazairi † Nakhii †

Units involved
Yemeni Armed Forces; Yemeni Land Forces; 4th Military Region; 115th Infantry Brigade; 111th Mechanized Brigade; 3rd Military Region; 21st Mechanized Brigade; 2nd Mountain Infantry Brigade; 2nd Naval Infantry Brigade; Yemeni Air Force; (Yemen) Popular Committees	Ansar al-Sharia

Strength
(Yemen) 1,600+ soldiers	Unknown

Casualties and losses
Per Yemen: 40 soldiers killed, 100 wounded	Per Yemen: 500 fighters killed, 39 captured
- 24,500 people displaced

On 29 April 2014, the Yemeni government launched a military offensive in Abyan and Shabwah Governorates in areas perceived to be strongholds of al-Qaeda in the Arabian Peninsula (AQAP). The primary targets of the offensive were the towns of al-Mahfad in al-Mahfad district, Abyan and Azzan in the neighbouring Mayfa'a district, Shabwah. The two towns, among other areas in the Abyan and Shabwah, were occupied by AQAP after they had lost control of the major cities of Abyan during the 2012 Southern Yemen offensive. The offensive was described as the largest military effort against AQAP by the Yemeni government since the previous offensive.

The operation was preceded by a series of United States airstrikes primarily targeting an AQAP training camp near al-Mahfad. The strikes killed 68 militants, including AQAP's local leader in al-Mahfad, Ali bin Likra al-Kazimy, who succumbed to his wounds later in May. Yemeni military forces along with Popular Committee tribesmen were divided into two fronts to focus on the two governorates. Several AQAP leaders died during the offensive, including multiple foreign commanders. On 6 May, Yemeni forces secured al-Mahfad after AQAP withdrew from the town in accordance to a deal with local tribal sheikhs. On 8 May, Azzan was captured by government forces, resulting in the fall of AQAP's last major stronghold in the south and the successful conclusion of the offensive. The offensive altogether killed 500 AQAP militants and 39. AQAP forces continued to wage attacks on Yemeni security forces in Abyan and Shabwah throughout the following months.

AQAP forces regrouped in Hadhramaut Governorate in the aftermath of losing their traditional strongholds in Abyan and Shabwah. The Yemeni government planned another offensive for the region, though the Houthi advance in Amran and later in Sanaa forced its attention elsewhere. During the ensuing Yemeni civil war, AQAP recaptured many of the areas taken from them during the offensive.

== Background ==
The Southern Yemen offensive in 2012 managed to force al-Qaeda in the Arabian Peninsula to withdraw from major cities in the region which they seized the year prior, including Abyan capital Zinjibar as well as Azzan in Shabwah. The offensive however did not reach al-Mahfad in western Abyan, where militants were able to reside and restock on supplies after promising the locals that they would provide them public services. AQAP then set up a major training camp on a mountain in the Wadi al-Khayyala enclave near the town. Azzan was reclaimed by militants in 2013 under the justification that they were stopping bandits from killing and robbing locals. They also provided public services in the area such as electricity, water, sanitation and trash collecting.

== Prelude ==
=== US drone strikes ===
From 19 April to late 21 April, the United States launched a barrage of drone strikes on AQAP targets in Abyan and Shabwah. On 19 April, a US airstrike in al-Bayda killed 10 suspected militants in a truck and injured another. Three civilians in a nearby vehicle were killed and five more wounded. A series of three airstrikes on the AQAP camp in Wadi al-Khayyala on 20 April killed 55 militants, including several foreign nationals and three local commanders. The camp was the same site of an AQAP video recorded in March showing a large gathering of militants, including AQAP leader Nasir al-Wuhayshi, which was described as "very provocative" by al-Mahfad tribal Sheikh Nasser al-Shamee. The Yemeni Interior Ministry stated that Yemeni MiG-29's took part in the several hours long air raids, though local witnesses described unmanned drones operated by the US. An airstrike later at midnight (9:00 p.m. GMT) killed three suspected militants in a vehicle in Shabwah. The Yemeni offensive launched later in the month was described as a follow-up to the air raids.

=== Preparation ===
The Popular Committees announced on 27 April that the Yemeni military had stationed troops in al-Mahfad and Ahwar in preparation for an offensive. It was labeled a preemptive move based on reports indicating that AQAP was attempting to infiltrate Lawdar district in Abyan to try and capture it. Major General Mahmoud al-Subaihi, commander of Yemen's 4th Military Region which includes Abyan, arrived in Lawdar to lead the offensive, which was being overseen by Minister of Defense Mohammed Nasser Ahmed. It claimed that the 115th Infantry Brigade, the 111th Mechanized Brigade stationed in Ahwar, and the 2nd Mountain Infantry Brigade stationed in Balhaf would be participating in the offensive among other brigades.

== Offensive ==
The offensive began on 29 April. Yemeni soldiers and Popular Committee personnel were divided into two fronts; one focusing on al-Mahfad, Ahwar, Mudiyah and Lawdar districts in Abyan and the other focusing on Azzan and al-Huta in Mayfa'a district, along with Habban, al-Rawdah and as-Said districts, as well as the Mafraq al-Saeed region of Rudum district in Shabwah. More than 1,600 soldiers were reported to be participating across both fronts. Locals described "heavy military convoys backed by armored vehicles and tanks travelling toward the Mahfad region." AQAP forces ambushed a convoy of Yemeni soldiers outside of Azzan, killing 15 and taking 15 more hostage, while losing 12 militants. Three of the hostages were executed by the next day, while two were released after being beaten. AQAP gunmen ambushed a seven-vehicle army convoy advancing towards Wadi Daiqa in al-Mahfad, killing three soldiers and wounding seven. A local from Lawdar reported clashes between AQAP fighters and security forces, along with "armored vehicles and tanks spread out across the area and a considerable number of soldiers deployed in and around the city of Lawdar."

On 30 April, army shelling in the towns of al-Majalah and Sanaj in al-Mahfad killed three AQAP militants and wounded 10 more. Yemeni forces made a "tactical withdrawal" from as-Said after discovering the bodies of the three soldiers taken hostage by AQAP the previous day. On 1 May, six AQAP members travelling in a three-vehicle convoy were killed by airstrikes in Azzan. The Yemeni military also reported the death of Uzbek AQAP commander Abu Muslim al-Uzbeki along with six other militants during a gunfight with advancing soldiers in al-Mahfad. AQAP fighters launched a surprise attack on al-Majalah behind front lines, though government forces later resecured the town, arresting several suspected militants, dismantling landmines and seizing AQAP vehicles.

On 2 May, Yemeni forces killed five AQAP fighters in Mayfa'a and destroyed three of their vehicles, one of which was mounted with anti-aircraft guns. The Yemeni army blocked the main road connecting Ataq, the capital of Shabwah, to Azzan and Habban. On 3 May, two soldiers were killed and four others wounded during clashes in Sanaj. Five militants were killed in the clashes, including Chechen AQAP commander Abu Islam al-Shishani. AQAP confirmed the death of Ali bin Likra al-Kazimy, its local commander in al-Mahfad, from the airstrikes on the Wadi al-Khayyala camp in April. Suspected militants wounded two soldiers at a central bank building in Shabwah after throwing hand grenades into it. AQAP released seven soldiers captured the previous day after tribal mediation efforts.

On 4 May, the Yemeni military killed 37 AQAP fighters in Jawl al-Raydah, Mayfa'a district. Locals reported "exceptionally" heavy artillery fire and air raids in the area targeting AQAP hideouts. Government sources claimed that the majority of militant casualties were Saudis, Afghans, Somalis and Chechens among other nationalities. Two AQAP members were killed and five more were captured in Mayfa'a as they attempted to travel to Ataq. Yemeni soldiers backed by air support raided an AQAP hideout in the Naqba hills of Shabwah, killing six militants, arresting four and destroying four of their vehicles, while suffering the loss of four soldiers. An AQAP suicide bomber attacked a military outport in Shabwah, killing six soldiers and injuring 20. Additional reinforcements were sent by the military to Ataq. On 5 May, a Yemeni soldier claimed that Major Gen. Mahmoud al-Subaihi gave militants in Abyan a 48-hour ultimatum to surrender their weapons or else the army would move in to seize the Wadi Daiqa.

On 6 May, Yemeni forces along with Popular Committee tribesmen captured the town of al-Mahfad and set up checkpoints along its main road after AQAP had blown up the local government compound and fled to the nearby mountains. Local residents described the army using heavy artillery to push into the town, while Popular Committee commander Amin Qassem reported stiff resistance during the battle. The Yemeni Ministry of Defense reported the seizure of seven suicide belts, 10 explosive devices and nearly 3,000 rounds of ammunition from the district. An Abyan official stated that AQAP had withdrawn from al-Mahfad after two days of negotiations with the Bakazim tribe and the local government. The militants were given until 7 May to withdraw from the town, though they did so one day early. Local tribal leader Sheikh Nasser al-Shamee described seeing 60 to 70 cars of AQAP militants as well as their families withdrawing from the area overnight.

The Yemeni government seized AQAP hideouts in Habban district and the village of Qarn al-Sawad in as-Said district, Shabwah. Government media reported that a military engineering team defused a minefield set by AQAP in as-Said district. The Yemeni army killed three wanted AQAP figures; a militant nicknamed "Picasso" who was known for killing and mutilating police informants, and siblings Nasser Atef al-Makni and Ahmed Atef al-Makni. Tribes in Mayfa'a district signed an agreement with AQAP which would halt the offensive for one week. The militants would be allowed to leave the area and in return they would allow the military to use the main road in the district without being attacked. The deal required the Yemeni military to not pursue AQAP militants from the governorate and "preserve private property and public peace." It would also see local tribesmen assisting security forces in the district while the militants turn in their heavy weapons and foreign fighters.

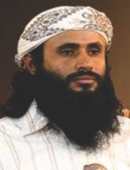
Sa'ad bin Atef al-Awlaki

On 7 May, Yemeni forces entered Jawl al-Raydah in Mayfa'a district, according to a local journalist, and the Wadi Daiqa in al-Mahfad district, according to the Saba News Agency. Clashes in the Wadi Daiqa killed three AQAP foreign fighters; Algerian commander Abu Ayub al-Jazairi, Pakistani commander Nakhii, also known as Mikassa, and a Saudi identified as Abu Dojana. The military claimed that it had killed Sa'ad bin Atef al-Awlaki, AQAP's regional commander in Shabwah, though this would later be proven false. On 8 May, the Yemeni government announced that it had captured all of Azzan, the last stronghold held by AQAP in the south. The 21st Mechanized Brigade entered the town from the western axis while the 2nd Naval Infantry and 2nd Mountain Infantry Brigades entered from the eastern axis. There were no reports of casualties during the operation. Popular Committee fighters assisted in clearing the area and occupying the main road in the district. Soldiers seized CDs and other documents containing AQAP plans for attacks in various Yemeni governorates. Many militants fled to the nearby al-Kur mountains, with Yemeni soldiers engaging in sporadic clashes with them throughout the day. The militants reportedly withdrew from Azzan in line with the agreement negotiated with the tribes and the military, according to a Shabwah official. After the seizure, the Yemeni military announced the successful conclusion of the offensive, claiming that several areas including al-Mahfad and Mudiyah districts in Abyan and Azzan, Mayfa'a and Habban districts in Shabwah were cleared of militants.

== Continued clashes ==
=== May ===
On 9 May, AQAP gunmen attempted to assassinate Mohammed Nasser Ahmed in Shabwah as his convoy was on its way to al-Mahfad. No one was killed in the attack. Clashes atop a hill overlooking the main road in the region killed three AQAP and injured three Yemeni soldiers. Soldiers at an army post in Mayfa'a killed an AQAP suicide bomber as he was attempting to attack them with an SVBIED. Dagestani AQAP explosives expert Taymour al-Dagestani as well as Saudi militant Torki Abdul Rahman were killed in Shabwah. The Popular Committees in Shabwah announced that they would suspend their activities for one week unless they receive privileges that Popular Committees in other governorates receive.

On 10 May, Yemeni forces killed seven AQAP fighters as they were patrolling in Abyan and Shabwah. Five tribesmen in Mayfa'a were kidnapped by AQAP in retaliation for their tribe's cooperation with the Yemeni government during the offensive.

On 13 May, Yemeni airstrikes targeted three trucks carrying heavy weaponry from Shabwah to Marib governorate. The strikes reportedly killed 5 AQAP members and the three truck drivers.

On the morning of 14 May, AQAP launched an attack on Yemeni forces in Azzan and Jawl al-Raydah in an attempt to retake the areas. Yemeni airstrikes targeted AQAP vehicles attempting to enter Azzan from several different directions. Yemeni forces engaged in street-to-street combat with the militants for several hours as residential structures suffered some damage and hundreds of residents fled the city or were forced indoors. During the battle, AQAP fighters raided the main police station of Azzan, killing local soldiers and raising their flag over the building. At the same time AQAP simultaneously attacked Jawl al-Raydah, the main military post for Mayfa'a district in Shabwah. The attacks, which were repelled by Yemeni forces, killed 13 AQAP militants and 10 Yemen soldiers. Initial reports on the attacks stated that Gen. Mohsen Saeed al-Ghazali, an adviser to the Yemeni Defense Minister, was among those killed, though this was later denied by the same sources.

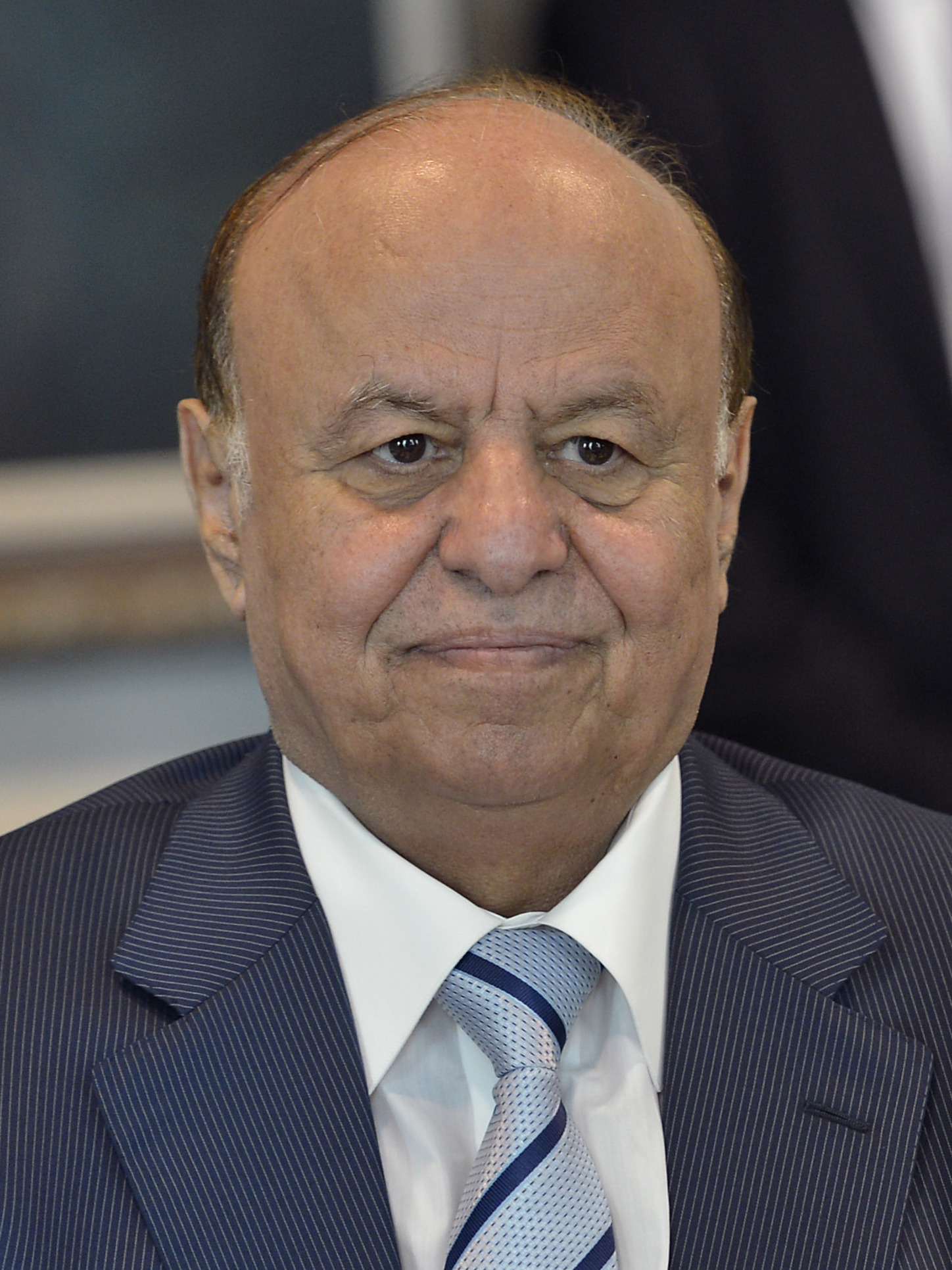
Abdrabbuh Mansour Hadi

On 16 May, Yemeni president Abdrabbuh Mansour Hadi declared "open war" against AQAP in a televised speech, announcing that the offensive against the militants would be expanded to include Marib and al-Bayda Governorates.

On 17 May, one Yemeni soldier and five AQAP fighters were killed after they attempted to ambush an army convoy in the city of Habban. Yemeni forces killed two Saudi AQAP members, identified as Ibrahim Hamad and Ahmed al-Harbi, during a gunfight in Azzan.

On 18 May, an AQAP commander identified by his nickname al-Meqdad, along with four of his aides, were killed in Qarn al-Sawad.

On 25 May, Yemeni soldiers carried out a raid against a group of AQAP operatives who fled the from the south after the offensive to Arhab District in Sanaa Governorate. Three militants were killed and four of them were arrested. The group of suspects, some of whom were foreigners, had travelled to Syria in late 2011 to participate in the Syrian civil war.

=== June ===
On 5 June, AQAP gunmen attacked a security checkpoint at dawn in the city of Bahyan, Shabwah. The attackers killed eight soldiers and six Popular Committee tribesmen, and set fire to two military vehicles before fleeing.

On 13 June, Yemeni forces attacked a car carrying four suspected AQAP militants in Ataq, killing all of the occupants.

On 27 June, the Yemeni army sent additional reinforcements to al-Mahfad, relieving the soldiers in charge of the city since May.

On 29 June, additional armored vehicles and security precautions were set up by the Yemeni military in Mayfa'a and Shabwah in preparation for potential AQAP attacks during the first days of Ramadan.

=== July ===
On 6 July, AQAP fighters ambushed an army vehicle outside of al-Mahfad, killing six soldiers and looting their weapons before fleeing.

On 7 July, a military vehicle at the entrance to a public market in al-Mahfad was ambushed by AQAP, killing two soldiers of the 39th Armored Brigade and injuring several others.

On 18 July, an anonymous Yemeni security source confirmed to Al Sahwa that the military was still mounting a campaign to find AQAP militants in al-Mahfad.

On 27 July, dozens of AQAP fighters launched simultaneous attacks targeting three army posts in al-Mahfad. Suicide car bombers each targeted the checkpoints, two of them exploding before reaching them and one detonating at the gate of a base. AQAP forces proceeded to clash with Yemeni soldiers, killing two and wounding 11. Seven AQAP fighters were killed in the gun battle.

On 30 July, a US drone strike on a car travelling through al-Mahfad killed four suspected AQAP members including mid-level local leader Ahmed al-Kazimi.

=== August ===
On 6 August, AQAP gunmen ambushed an army vehicle in Habban, killing five soldiers and wounding one before fleeing.

On 31 August, Ansar al-Sharia militants launched an attack on an army barracks in Jawl al-Raydah, sending a suicide car bomb into the camp before engaging in clashes with the soldiers, killing at least nine and injuring several others. Militants also raided a Special Security Forces barracks near Azzan. The attacks killed at least a combined 15 soldiers and injured 20.

== Impact ==
During a press conference on 5 June, military spokesperson Saeed al-Faquih stated that 500 suspected AQAP militants were killed and 39 were captured in the south since the beginning of the offensive. He also said that 40 army soldiers had been killed and 100 were wounded during the operation.

=== Humanitarian ===
By 20 May, the head of Shabwah's Displaced Persons Relief Committee, Saeed Mohammed al-Marnoum, reported that 21,000 people across the governorate were displaced. The United Nations Office for the Coordination of Humanitarian Affairs (OCHA) estimated that up to 24,500 people, or 3,500 households, were displaced across Abyan and Shabwah by the offensive, including 21,000 verified IDPs, of which 18,760 were in Shabwah.

=== Security ===
AQAP retreated from Abyan and Shabwah through 2014 as a result of the offensive, with most of its activities instead shifting to Hadhramaut governorate, described as "remote and ill-governed" by the United States Department of State in a report. According to a tally by War on the Rocks, between August 2014 and mid-April 2015 AQAP's attacks were significantly more concentrated in Hadhramaut as compared to Abyan and Shabwah. Locally stationed soldiers and Popular Committees led a series of operations against AQAP, though with limited support from the government and limited success. AQAP aggressively countered these operations, particularly in al-Qatn and Seiyun in the Wadi Hadhramaut valley as opposed to their traditional strongholds in the more populated coastal areas.

== Media coverage ==
Media output by the Yemeni Ministry of Defense covering the offensive was substantial and unprecedented in the campaign against AQAP. By 27 May 2014, the government-affiliated September 26 Net had published 23 videos courtesy of the Moral Guidance Department, portraying army forces taking part in the offensive and securing significant gains. AQAP also conducted its own propaganda campaign against the government, uploading videos through its media wing depicting the effect of the offensive on the civilians in their controlled territories.

=== Censorship ===
On 6 May, American journalist Adam Baron was detained by authorities at an immigration office in Sanaa after a receiving a call saying there was an issue with his documentation. He was ordered to leave the country on the grounds that he was "no longer welcome in Yemen”, doing so on 8 May. The Christian Science Monitor had published an article by Barron on 5 May exploring how the Yemeni government had little control over the optics and narrative of the offensive due to Yemeni reporting on social media. Fellow American journalist Tik Root was denied entry in Sanaa on 8 May and was forced to return to Turkey. British-Irish journalist Iona Craig suggested that the Yemeni government may be trying to censor journalists in Yemen and that they may have "something to hide." The Committee to Protect Journalists urged the Yemeni government to allow journalists to report in the country freely.

On 14 May, Al Jazeera correspondent Hamdi al-Bokari along with cameraman Sameer al-Nimri were ordered to cease their coverage of the offensive and leave the area during a phone call by the director general of foreign media in the Ministry of Information, Shawqi Shaher. Bokari said he was given no reason for the order, and was threatened with the revocation of his journalist visa unless they remained in their hotel in Ataq until they were evacuated. The two were transported to Sanaa on 18 May. Bokari claims that the order may have been given to him because he was "showing the humanitarian impact of the military assault on civilians in the area, including what he alleges was indiscriminate government shelling." He also states that his footage disproves the government's claims that Azzan was in complete control of Yemeni forces. Several Yemeni human rights organizations, along with Human Rights Watch, condemned the incident. September 26 Net refuted Bokari's claims on its website, writing "a correspondent affiliated with a TV channel appears talking incoherently and giving fictional and mistaken information from Ataq city of Shabwah governorate."

== Aftermath ==
The Houthi takeover of Amran in July 2014 shifted the government's focus away from AQAP and the offensive. By the end of 2014, with the Houthi takeover of Sanaa and breakout of the Yemeni civil war, the focus on counterterrorism was mostly halted. Capitalizing on the security gap created by the civil war, AQAP seized al-Mahfad on 9 March 2015. The group recaptured Azzan on 1 February 2016 during its Southern Abyan offensive.

== See more ==
- 2012 Abyan offensive
