= Shabwah campaign =

Campaign of the Yemeni Civil War

Shabwah campaign (March–August 2015)
- Part of the South Yemen insurgency and the Shabwah Governorate offensive (2014–2016)
- Shabwah Governorate
Date	29 March – 15 August 2015 (4 months, 2 weeks and 3 days)
Location	Shabwah Governorate, Yemen
Result	Coalition victory: Houthis initially capture the provincial capital Ataq and Saeed by May 2015; Pro-Hadi forces recapture Ataq and the rest of the governorate on 15 August 2015

Belligerents
(Yemen) Supreme Revolutionary Committee: Houthi fighters; Security Forces (pro-Saleh); Yemeni Republican Guard	Cabinet of Yemen: Security Forces (pro-Hadi); Southern Movement; People's Committees; Popular resistance; Air support: Arab Coalition: Saudi Arabia (leader); Bahrain; Egypt; Jordan; Kuwait; Morocco; Sudan; United Arab Emirates; AQAP

Casualties and losses
152 killed	43 killed

The Shabwah campaign (March–August 2015) was a campaign for control of the Shabwah Governorate of Yemen, between the Houthis and Yemen Army units loyal to Ali Abdullah Saleh on one side, and militiamen and Yemen Army units loyal to Abdrabbuh Mansur Hadi on the other side. The offensive was also launched during a previously started AQAP offensive.

== Campaign ==
On 29 March 2015, fighting centered in the oil-rich Usaylan region. 38 fighters were killed in clashes between the Houthis and Sunni tribesmen. Tribal sources confirmed the death toll, and claimed only eight of them were from their side, with the other 30 either Houthis or their allies from the Yemeni military. The tribesmen were also reinforced by weapons received via 200 vehicles from tribes in the nearby province of Abyan. After the fighting, Houthi positions were hit by Coalition air-strikes.

On 1 April, fighting at a major army base left 35 Houthi and allied army fighters, along with 20 tribesmen, dead.

On 6 April, the Houthis were reported to be negotiating with local tribes for safe transit to Ataq, the provincial capital. However, additional fighting on the same day killed two Houthi fighters, while another eight were killed in an airstrike. Two days later, 10 Houthis, three Houthi-allied soldiers and three tribesmen were killed in further clashes.

On 9 April, air-strikes hit the Houthi-held Muhra base, outside Ataq, after which the Houthis and their allies seized government and police installations in the city. Soon, hundreds of armed tribesmen mobilised on the outskirts of Ataq to attack the Houthis. Still, the Houthi capture of the provincial capital was reportedly facilitated by local tribal chiefs and security officials.

On 10 April, 25 Houthi fighters were killed in a suicide car-bomb attack, carried out by Al-Qaeda in the Arabian Peninsula (AQAP), on their security post in the Bayhan region. As is the case in the neighboring Abyan Governorate, it was reported that AQAP fighters were ordered to fight alongside pro-Hadi forces against the Houthis.

On 13 April, pro-Hadi tribal militia took control of two military bases belonging to units that were guarding oil facilities in the Belhaf area. 15 soldiers stationed at one base were killed.

On 19 April, seven Houthis were killed in clashes in the province.

On 25 May, 17 Houthi and 11 tribal fighters were killed in fighting in Ataq.

At the end of May, the Houthis captured the city of Saeed, after a number of tribes in the area switched allegiance.

On 11 August, after the Pro-Hadi forces recaptured the governorates of Aden, Lahij, Dhale and Abyan they will launch an offensive to retake Shabwah Governorate, the last Southern governorate with a Houthi rebel presence.

On 15 August, pro-Hadi forces regained control of the entire Shabwah Governorate, including the city of Ataq, after Houthi forces and their allies withdrew from the region.

== Shabwah Governorate Offensive (December 2017) ==
On 15 December 2017, the Yemen National Army from the 19th Infantry, 21st Mika, and 26th Infantry Brigades along with the Southern Resistance launched an offensive to take control of several sites in Bayhan and Usaylan, the last Houthis stronghold in Shabwa Governorate.

On 24 December 2017, the Yemen National Army completely captured Bayhan and Usaylan district.

== Aftermath ==
On October 17, 2021 Houthi forces captured the Usaylan, Bayhan, and Ain districts of Shabwah Governorate during the Battle of Marib.

On January 26, 2022, Hadi government forces including the Giants Brigades recaptured the districts from Houthi rebel forces. In one 24-hour period at the start of the offensive, more than 125 Houthis and 70 pro-Hadi fighters were killed in the fighting.

On August 10, 2022, the Governor of Shabwah was reported to have announced the start of an operation to restore stability.
