= 2022 Abu Dhabi attack =

2022 drone attack in Abu Dhabi, United Arab Emirates

- Location: Abu Dhabi, United Arab Emirates
- Date: 17 January 2022 (4 years ago); 14:29 – 14:50 (UTC+4)
- Target: Fuel trucks and airport infrastructure
- Attack type: Drone attack; Missile attack
- Weapons: Drones, ballistic missiles, cruise missiles
- Deaths: 3 civilians
- Injuries: 6 civilians
- Perpetrator: Houthis

On 17 January 2022, the Houthis in Yemen conducted a terrorist attack on the United Arab Emirates using drones and ballistic missiles, targeting three oil tanker trucks and under-construction airport extension infrastructure in Abu Dhabi. Although several missiles and drones were intercepted, 3 civilians were killed and 6 were injured by a drone attack.

== Background ==
Since 2014 Yemen has been embroiled in civil war. The rebels are led by the Supreme Political Council, which is composed and led mainly by the Shia Islamist movement known as the Houthis. These forces are against the government of Mansur Hadi. A Saudi Arabian–led intervention in Yemen, which includes the United Arab Emirates, intervened in 2015 to support and aid Hadi-government forces. Saudi Arabia and its supporters have accused the Islamic Republic of Iran of backing and using Houthis as proxies, which Iran has denied. The UAE plays a significant role in the war, lending major assistance to pro-government militias including the Giants Brigades.

Throughout the conflict, which was considered to be one of the world's largest humanitarian crisis, Houthis have carried numerous attacks outside Yemen, mainly on Saudi Arabia. Very few of their attacks have actually taken place outside Saudi Arabia and Yemen. While the Houthis continuously claimed they had organized multiple attacks across the UAE pre-2022, these claims were denied by Emirati authorities.

In 2019, Houthi forces announced they had struck a major Saudi Arabian oil facility. The Saudi government charged Iran with complicity in the attacks, which it denied. Investigations by the United Nations found little evidence that such a sophisticated operation could not have been carried out by the Houthis without direct assistance from a foreign power. In 2020, in retaliation for what it considered to be a threat to the region, the United States assassinated Iranian major general Qasem Soleimani, entrenching instability further into the Middle East as pro-Iran forces struggled to maintain their foothold in the region. In 2021 Iraqi Shi'a paramilitaries attempted to assassinate Iraqi Prime Minister Mustafa Al-Kadhimi, marking a major turning point in the history of the region. Iran was accused by pro-Saudi and pro-Western figures of supplying the drones to the perpetrators. Iran denied all ties to the attack and condemned the attempt to kill Kadhimi. In 2021, Joe Biden removed the Houthis from the United States list of terrorist organizations on the grounds that otherwise Yemeni civilians would be unable to acquire humanitarian aid.

On January 11, 2022, the Houthis lost three districts during the ongoing clashes in Shabwah Governorate to Emirati-trained Giants Brigades, resulting in their campaign to gain the districts of Ain, Bayhan, and Usaylan to collapse. Houthi plans to lead an offensive on the Yemeni city of Marib were also thwarted.

A few days before the city was attacked, and on the second anniversary of Qasem Soleimani's death, Houthis captured and raided the Emirati cargo ship Rwabee near Al Hudaydah, which they claimed was carrying military equipment the UAE planned to supply to pro-government forces. The coalition said the vessel was holding hospital equipment. In response to Houthi territorial losses in Ain, Bayhan, and Usaylan districts in Yemen which were thwarted by the Giants Brigades, Houthi's launched a drone and a missile attack which they called "Operation Hurricane of Yemen" on Abu Dhabi, killing 3 civilians and injuring 6 others with a drone attack.

== Attack ==
At around 10:00 am, on January 17, 2022, drones struck three oil refueling vehicles in an oil refinery for the Abu Dhabi National Oil Company in Musaffah. (Note: The facility was very close to Al Dhafra Air Base. However, there is no evidence the Houthis specifically targeted this site.) A Houthi military spokesman said the group fired "a large number" of drones and five ballistic missiles in the attack. The United Arab Emirates stated that several missiles and drones were intercepted. A drone attack simultaneously set an extension of the Abu Dhabi International Airport on fire, with no recorded fatalities. Abu Dhabi Police identified two Indians and one Pakistani killed in the attack, Six people were injured by the drone strikes.

A study by the Associated Press of satellite photos taken by Planet Labs revealed smoke rising above the ADNOC facility. Images taken after the bombing showed "scorch marks and white fire-suppressing foam" on the facility's ground.

Shortly after the strikes happened, Saudi authorities reported they had just intercepted nine missiles launched by the Houthis towards Saudi Arabia.

Yahya Saree, the Houthi military spokesperson, claimed responsibility for the attack on behalf of the organization. Houthi officials also stated that drones had struck an airport in the city of Dubai, but the Emirati government did not find any evidence of such an attack.

== Victims ==
Three civilians were killed during the attack. They were identified as two Indian nationals from Punjab: 28-year-old Hardeep Singh and 35-year-old Hardev Singh; and a Pakistani national, 29-year-old Mamoor Khan from Waziristan. The victims' bodies were repatriated to their homes in India and Pakistan respectively.

Six other civilians were injured, including two Egyptians, two Indians, and two Pakistanis.

== Aftermath ==
The Emirati government immediately condemned the attack. The Minister of Foreign Affairs and International Cooperation, Abdullah bin Zayed Al Nahyan, vowed that the UAE would not back down to "those responsible for this unlawful targeting of our country" and hold the Houthis accountable for their actions.

A preliminary investigation by Emirati authorities supported the Houthis' claims of a drone attack, as well as the presence of both ballistic and cruise missiles.

The Emirates proceeded to ask American Secretary of State Antony Blinken to restore the Houthis on the USA's list of terrorist entities. American President Joe Biden promised to reconsider its designation in response. Crown Prince Mohamed bin Zayed Al Nahyan telephoned Indian Minister of External Affairs S. Jaishankar the following day, expressing empathy for the Indian victims of the attack and their families.

On January 21 the United Nations Security Council passed a resolution denouncing "in the strongest terms the heinous terrorist attacks in Abu Dhabi, United Arab Emirates, on Monday, 17 January, as well as in other sites in Saudi Arabia."

On January 24, 2022, the United Arab Emirates Armed Forces intercepted another two ballistic missiles from the Houthis heading towards Al Dhafra Air Base in Abu Dhabi. The air base also houses US troops.

Yemeni Giants Brigade backed by the United Arab Emirates continued to push in Yemen's energy-producing Marib region against the Houthis despite warnings by the Iran-aligned movement of further attacks on the UAE. On January 25, 2022, they announced they took control of Harib District, a district in Marib that the Giants Brigade had entered two weeks earlier.

=== Retaliation ===
The Saudi Arabian–led intervention in Yemen announced later that day it had retaliated by air striking Houthi targets in Sanaa. A Saudi-affiliated media outlet initially reported eleven people had been killed. The Washington Post and pro-Houthi outlets reported casualty estimates at 14 with 11 wounded. Among the dead were Major General Abdullah Qassem al-Junaid, a Houthi official and the former leader of the Houthi air force academy in Sana'a and many members of his family, including his wife and 25-year-old son. An airstrike in a prison located in the city of Saada killed around 80 people.

The strikes were described by Reuters as the "deadliest coalition strikes on Yemen's Sanaa since 2019".

=== Reactions ===
The attack received outrage from the Gulf Cooperation Council, especially Saudi Arabia, which described the events as a "cowardly terrorist attack". Saudi Colonel Turki Al-Maliki described the attack as a war crime. The Saudi led coalition announced that a comprehensive deterrence operation would be carried out in response to the attack. Bahrain, Oman, Qatar, Iraq and Kuwait all issued strong denouncements of the attacks in Abu Dhabi. They were joined in by the Arab League and the Organisation of Islamic Cooperation.

Yemen, which is where the Houthis operate, strongly denounced the incident, describing it as an escalation of the war and an act of terror.

Soon after the attack was reported, Egyptian Foreign Minister Sameh Shoukry denounced the incident, voicing solidarity with the Emirates.

Indian Minister of External Affairs, S. Jaishankar termed the attacked to be "unacceptable" and expressed "shock and deepest consolidates to the ones who died" while "prayed for faster recovery of the injured".

American National Security Advisor Jake Sullivan called for the perpetrators to be held accountable and that American "commitment to the security of the UAE is unwavering, and we stand beside our Emirati partners against all threats to their territory."

Israeli prime minister Naftali Bennett tweeted his condemnation of the "terrorist drone attack," sending a letter of condolence to Mohamed bin Zayed via his spokesman. The next day he told the World Economic Forum in a speech that Iran was financing terror operations abroad, which has been interpreted as a reference to the attack in Abu Dhabi.

Pakistani Prime Minister Imran Khan called Sheikh Mohamed bin Zayed, telling him he was shocked by the attacks and stood in solidarity with the Emirates. Pakistan had lost one citizen in the attacks. On January 18 Russian spokeswoman Maria Zakharova condemned the "provocation against civil infrastructure facilities in the friendly United Arab Emirates." Russia expressed concerns that such attacks could expand from the UAE to other nations. Duma member Leonid Slutsky voiced significant criticism of the Houthis, warning that any further attacks would result in the derailment of the Yemeni peace process. Turkey's foreign spokesman, Mevlüt Çavuşoğlu, had a phone call with Sheikh Mohamed bin Zayed, in which he decried the event.

Iran responded later than other countries. The day after the attack, the Iranian Foreign Ministry issued a statement that the "solution to any regional crisis is not to resort to war and violence", in response to what it termed to be novel "Yemen-linked developments." While the statement did not explicitly mention the attack on Abu Dhabi, the event was implied.

In addition to these countries, Argentina, Ethiopia, Japan, Germany, Tunisia, Lebanon, Singapore, Malaysia, Jordan, Sudan, Italy, the United Kingdom, the European Union and Morocco expressed strong condemnations of the attacks.

United Nations Secretary General António Guterres denounced the events while calling for stability to be maintained in the region. In a statement Guterres condemned the attack, calling attacks on civilians and civilian infrastructure as prohibited by international law. French foreign affairs minister Jean-Yves Le Drian voiced similar sentiments.

Houthi spokesman Mohammed Abdel Salam justified the attack, warning of any further attempt by pro-Saudi forces to intervene in Yemen against the Houthis, and threatened to launch more attacks.

The strikes were congratulated by a number of Iraqi Shi'a paramilitaries, including Kata'ib Hezbollah.

A week ahead of the 2021 FIFA Club World Cup, the United States raised a travel warning, citing the missile and drone attacks by Houthi rebels in the UAE. The Biden administration raised a highest level of warning against travel to the UAE, due to the threat of Houthi attacks and COVID-19 cases in the country.
