= Azzan =

Town in Yemen

Azzan عزان
- Town
- Location in Yemen
- Coordinates: 14°19′32″N 47°26′48″E
- Country: Yemen
- Governorate: Shabwah Governorate
- District: Mayfa'a district

Population (2004)
  - Total: 12,400
- Time zone: UTC+3

Azzan (Note: Arabic: عزان) is a town in southern Yemen. Located in the Mayfa'a district of Shabwah Governorate, the town has a population of around 12,400 people as of 2004, and is the second-largest commercial center in the province.

== Economy ==
Azzan is the second largest commercial center in Shabwah, only behind the provincial capital of Ataq. This is due to its position along a major highway which connects Aden to Hadhramaut Governorate, and being at the center of four southern districts in Shabwah; Mayfa'a, Ar Rawdah, Rudum and Habban. It is also located near Balhaf, which contains a major oil facility off the coast of Yemen. Azzan is a hub for thousands of shoppers from across Shabwah during weekdays, but is relatively empty during weekends. After a prolonged period of instability which negatively affected the economy, Azzan had experienced a revival in commercial activity by 2018, owing to both an improvement in the local security situation and the arrival of expatriates from more unstable areas of Yemen as well as from Saudi Arabia.

== Public services ==
=== Education ===
Six primary and secondary schools are present in Azzan. Most notable is the Azzan Secondary School, first built in 1962 as an intermediate school before being converted to a preparatory school, and eventually a secondary school by the 1980s. Apart from locals, it boasts students from numerous districts of Shabwah. Due to this, it has suffered from overcrowding, along with deterioration of the school building. The Azzan Secondary School, Azzan Primary School for Boys and Girls, and Hafsa Primary School, were reopened in 2017 following an Emirati-funded renovation project.

=== Healthcare ===
The main healthcare center in the city is the Azzan General Hospital, which serves both the city and multiple nearby districts. It was built by British authorities prior to their withdrawal from Yemen in 1967. The hospital has suffered from its small capacity, government neglect, and a lack of modern medical equipment, specifically in the ophthalmology and orthopedic departments. Yemeni airstrikes had destroyed the maternity and pediatric wards in 2014. Although reportedly staffed by qualified personnel, a staff member said in 2017 that it still needed ENT specialists, urologists, pediatricians, dermatologists, and an intensive care unit, and that it was running mostly from support by charities and philanthropists. In light of the COVID-19 pandemic in 2020, the hospital announced that it would treat only emergency cases and childbirth, and would allow no more than one accompanying visitor per patient.

The first charitable hospital in Shabwah was established in Azzan by the Shabwa Development Foundation with support from the local and federal government. Originally envisioned in 2010 to treat issues relating to kidney failure due to its prevalence in the area, the project experienced significant delays due to the conflict in Yemen, with its eventually opening taking place on 14 October 2020. The hospital operates six departments; a kidney and urology clinic, an internal medicine and cardiology clinic, a pediatrics clinic, a women's and obstetrics clinic, a general surgery and orthopedics clinic, and a walk-in clinic. Its services attract low-income patients from many places in the region outside of Azzan. Despite having ample equipment, as of 2024 some departments were not operational due to funding issues.

=== Electricity ===
The accessibility of electricity is a major and longstanding issue in Azzan. As of 2023, electricity in Azzan is available only for around three hours a day. Issues regarding electricity include regular power outages, low voltage currents which damage local appliances, and deterioration of the main and secondary electrical networks, which were built in 1985. Due to the electrical network Mayfa'a not being originally built to connect to Ataq, the electrical network of Azzan is instead connected to the Habban Water Factory, rather than the main line to Habban district. This has resulted in a deterioration of the volume of electricity when it arrives to the Azzan network.
