= Al-Hawtah =

Town in Yemen

Al-Hawtah الحوطة
- Town
- Hawtat al-Faqih Ali حوطة الفقيه علي
- Location in Yemen
- Coordinates: 14°23′0.96″N 47°23′56″E
- Country: Yemen
- Governorate: Shabwah
- District: Mayfa'a
- Established: 1372
- Founder: Ali Muhammad bin Omar al-Habani al-Khawlani

Population (2004)
  - Total: 10,000
- Time zone: UTC+3 (Yemen Standard Time)

Al-Hawtah, (Note: Arabic: الحوطة) also known as Hawtat al-Faqih Ali, (Note: Arabic: حوطة الفقيه علي) is a village in east-central Yemen. It is located in Shabwah Governorate.

== History ==
The history of al-Hawtah dates back to the 14th century. Yemeni sources state it was founded in 727 AH (1372 CE) by scholar and jurist Ali Muhammad bin Omar al-Habani al-Khawlani. The name "al-Hawtah" literally translates to "village" or "small settlement," while "al-Faqih Ali" is meant to honor the town's founder.

Al-Hawtah historically acted as the main urban area and commercial hub of eastern Yemen, and a bridge for trade with western Yemen. Tribes and trade caravans from many areas, including al-Bayda, Marib, Najran, Beihan, and Hadhramaut, would gather at the town's marketplace during an annual event commemorating the birthday of al-Khawlani. Products traded in the marketplace were mostly livestock and foodstuffs. The town also had a historical reputation for peace and harmony, as those entering were required to forfeit their weapons. Peace was further maintained through the religious environment and presence of scholars and preachers. This made al-Hawtah a prominent meeting point for tribes signing peace agreements and treaties, and allowed it to remain most untouched by conflict between tribes.

The trading hub status of al-Hawtah had ended by the late 1950's with the introduction of dirt roads and cars. The town has been prone to flash floods due to its location upon a river bank, the worst of which occurred in 1996, destroying large amounts of farmland and houses and killing around 30 locals.

== Geography ==
Al-Hawtah is located in Mayfa'a district of central Shabwah Governorate. It consists of towering houses built into a cliffside of large mountains, and is situated on the Wadi Amqayn river banks. These banks provide the town with an abundance of fertile soil. Al-Ittihad described the landscape as "reminiscent of a masterpiece painted by a skilled artist."

== Demographics ==
Al-Hawtah had a population of over 10,000 according to a national census in 2004, making it the fifth-largest settlement in Shabwah at the time. This figure has likely risen since then due to high annual birth rates and marriage rates among the local youth. The local population are predominantly members of the al-Faqih Ali tribe.
