= Beihan (disambiguation) =

Beihan may refer to:

== Yemen ==
- Beihan, also known as Beihan al-Qasab, the capital of Bayhan District
- Bayhan District, also known as Beihan District, a district of Shabwah Governorate
- Emirate of Beihan, a former state located in modern Bayhan District

== China ==
- Northern Han (951–979), a dynasty in North China during the Five Dynasties period
- Beihan Township, Hebei (北汉乡), a township in Renqiu, Hebei
- Beihan Township, Shanxi (北韩乡), a township in Fushan County, Shanxi

== Korea ==
- North Korea (北韩), formally the Democratic People's Republic of Korea

== See also ==
- MV Beihan, an Empire ship that was renamed to Beihan in 1955
