= Al Khabr =

- Village
- Location in Yemen
- Coordinates: 14°8′19″N 47°3′45″E
- Country: Yemen
- Governorate: Shabwah Governorate

Al Khabr is a village in the Shabwah Governorate of southern Yemen, northeast of Ahwar and south of Ataq. The village is primarily agricultural, being located in a fertile river valley.
