= Abu Zara'a =

Yemeni politician and military leader (born 1980)

- أبو زرعة
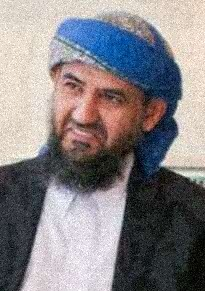
- Abu Zara'a in 2025

Member of the Presidential Leadership Council
- Incumbent
- Assumed office 7 April 2022
- President: Rashad al-Alimi

Commander of Southern Giants Brigades
- Incumbent
- Assumed office 2016

Personal details
- Born: Abd al-Rahman al-Mahrami; February 3, 1980 (age 46) Rasad district, Abyan Governorate, South Yemen
- Education: Dar al-Hadith, Dammaj

Military service
- Allegiance: Yemen (Presidential Leadership Council); (South Yemen) Southern Transitional Council
- Years of service: 2015–present
- Commands: Southern Giants Brigade
- Battles/wars: Yemeni civil war (2014–present); Battle of Aden (2015); Battle of al-Mansoura; Al Hudaydah offensive; Operation Golden Spear; Operation Southern Cyclone; Battle of Marib

Abd al-Rahman al-Mahrami (Note: Arabic: عبد الرحمن المحرمي) (born 3 February 1980), commonly known by the kunya Abu Zara'a, (Note: Arabic: أبو زرعة) is a Yemeni politician and military leader who has served as a member of the Presidential Leadership Council (PLC) since its formation in 2022.

A Salafist and shop owner in his early life, Mahrami became a military commander for pro-government forces against the Houthis upon the breakout of the Yemeni civil war. He has served as the leader of the Southern Giants Brigade, a military unit allied with the Southern Transitional Council (STC) and supported by the United Arab Emirates, from its establishment in 2016 to 2019, and from 2020 onwards.

== Early life ==
Mahrami was born on 3 February 1980 in Jabal Mahram, Rasad district, located in the Yafa'a region of Abyan Governorate. He was the third son of local security director Saleh Zain. His family moved to Aden when he was four years old, where he received primary education at the 9 June School and secondary education at the al-Nahda Secondary School in Sheikh Othman district, in which he was placed first in his class during his final year. He reportedly memorized the Quran in its entirety during this time. After graduating, he travelled to Dammaj in the northern Saada Governorate, where he studied and graduated from the Dar al-Hadith, a renowned Salafist institute. Prior to 2015, he reportedly owned a small honey and herbal store in Sheikh Othman, refraining from politics or public life.

== Yemeni civil war ==
=== Military career ===
Mahrami emerged as a prominent military leader fighting against the Houthis during the Yemeni civil war. Between 2014 and 2015, he and many other Salafists were expelled from Dammaj by the Houthis, who had captured the area. As the Houthis advanced towards Aden in 2015, he joined the Southern Resistance and fought against them during the Battle of Aden, in which they were successfully forced to withdraw further north.

With support from the United Arab Emirates, the Giants Brigades were created in 2016 under the command of Mahrami, largely recruiting Salafist fighters who had defended Aden the previous year. In that year, he planned an operation in Aden's al-Mansoura district which had it secured from al-Qaeda in the Arabian Peninsula. In 2017, the UAE appointed Mahrami to lead government-allied forces in the Western Coast offensive against the Houthis. He also led Operation Golden Spear in 2018, which saw the capture of Mocha by government forces. His performance in these operations granted him recognition from the Yemeni government as well as the Saudi Arabia-led coalition.

In 2019, Mahrami was dismissed from the Giants Brigade amidst allegations of corruption, and replaced him with fellow Salafi commander Ali al-Hassani. However, following the 2019 clashes between forces of the Southern Transitional Council and the Yemeni government and Hassani's inability to take a clear stance between the two sides, the UAE had him removed and Mahrami reinstated as the group's commander in 2020. This attracted criticism from some leaders in the military. Regardless, Mahrami continued with his duties, and led the Giants Brigades in Operation Southern Cyclone in January 2022, which saw the liberation of Shabwah and parts of Marib from the Houthis. During this month, the Giants Brigades were renamed to the Southern Giants Brigades.

=== PLC and STC ===
The Presidential Leadership Council, formed in April 2022 as part of President Abdrabbuh Mansour Hadi's transfer of power, included Mahrami among its eight founding members. His inclusion stemmed from his military prowess demonstrated in previous Giants Brigades operations. Mahrami, who previously had a little-known public profile owing to his Salafist beliefs, made his first media appearance following the formation of the PLC, in which he announced the inclusion of the Giants Brigades in the Southern Armed Forces of the STC.

As part of a restructuring process of the STC, President Aydarus al-Zubaydi announced the selection of three vice presidents in May 2023, them being Mahrami, fellow PLC member Faraj al-Bahsani, and General Ahmed Saeed bin Brik. In August 2024, Zubaydi assigned Mahrami to oversee STC security and counterterrorism agencies and their reorganization. Mahrami's appointment would allow for greater coordination within the National Resistance Forces (NRF), and may have been done to counter the expansion of the newly-established, Saudi-backed National Shield Forces.
