= Artist Hotel =

Hotel in Tel Aviv, Israel

Coordinates: 32°4′37.9″N 34°46′5.3″E

The Artist is a hotel in Tel Aviv, Israel. It was opened in 2009, and renovated and reopened in 2019. In addition to focusing on art within the hotel, the hotel's architecture has itself been called a work of art by Jewish Chronicle magazine.

== Overview ==
The hotel features works by contemporary Israeli artists, with a mural by a different artist on each floor. The foyer of the hotel features a piece by sculptor Zadok Ben-David and the lobby features a video installation by artist Sigalit Landau.

The hotel is furnished in a retro 1960s style and has a rooftop terrace. The lobby contains a library full of art and design-focused books and magazines The Artplus Hotel offers free bicycles to its guests to ride around the city.

== Highlights ==
The hotel won a 2019 TripAdvisor Travelers' Choice Award for the "Trendiest Hotel in the Middle East".
