= Ataq Airport =

Airport in Yemen

- IATA: AXK; ICAO: OYAT

Summary
- Airport type: Public/Military
- Location: Ataq, Yemen
- Elevation AMSL: 3,735 ft / 1,138 m
- Coordinates: 14°33′04″N 046°49′34″E

Map
- Location of airport in Yemen

Runways
Direction	Length		Surface
Direction	m	ft	Surface
13/31	2,890	9,482	Asphalt

Ataq Airport (IATA: AXK, ICAO: OYAT) is an airport serving Ataq, the capital city of the Shabwah Governorate in the southeastern part of Yemen.

On January 8th 2025, the Civil Aviation & Meteorology Authority announced the reopening of the airport for commercial use

== Facilities ==
The airport is located at an elevation of 3,735 feet (1,138 m) above mean sea level. It has one runway designated 13/31 with an asphalt surface, measuring 2,890 by 50 metres (9,482 ft × 164 ft).

== See also ==
- List of airports in Yemen
