= Shabwah Governorate offensive =

Insurgent campaign by Al-Qaeda in the Arabian Peninsula

- Part of the South Yemen insurgency and al-Qaeda insurgency in Yemen
Date	March 2014 – December 2016
Location	Habban District and Azzan, Shabwah Governorate, Yemen
Status	AQAP victory: Al-Qaeda captured Habban and Azzan; Pro-Hadi fighters recaptured Azzan; Azzan recaptured by AQAP; In March 2019, only 20 percent of Shabwah was controlled by AQAP and its allies.

Belligerents
AQAP	Yemen (United Arab Emirates) United Arab Emirates; Supported by United States

Commanders and leaders
Abu Amal †; Yasser al Marouh; Sa’ad bin ‘Atef al Awlaki; Tareq Al-Fadhli; Abdullah Al-Fadhli †	(Yemen) Colonel Mohammed Salmeen bin Lashqam † (Yemen) Jafar Al-Hamed † (Yemen) Brig Gen Aziz Al-Ateeqi (Yemen) Maj Gen Nasser Al-Nuba (Yemen) Governor Ahmed Lamlas (Yemen) Brig Gen Alawi Ali Nasser Al-Harethi (Yemen) Brig Gen Abdullah Saeed Saleh Al-Islami (Yemen) Ahmed Mohsen Ruwais Al-Sulaymani (Yemen) Awad Al-Dhaboul (Yemen) Sheikh Ali Mohsen Al-Sulaymani (Yemen) Sheikh Ali Al-Hajari

Casualties and losses
35+ killed	30+ killed 40+ wounded

The Shabwah Governorate offensive was an insurgent campaign by al-Qaeda in the Arabian Peninsula (AQAP) forces to take control of Shabwah Governorate during the Yemeni Civil War.

== Habban incidents ==
Although al-Qaeda in the Arabian Peninsula is not active in Habban district, Shabwah Governorate, the first violence was reported there in mid-March 2014 when three AQAP militants were reportedly killed while planting a car bomb. According to tribal sources, the explosion occurred near the home of al-Qaeda Sabban commander Yasser al Marouh. Yemeni security forces identified the three militants; two were Yemeni, and one was a Saudi national. The house was severely damaged by the blast, but it was unknown if the commander was home. One bystander was also killed; two were reportedly injured by the explosion, and were rushed to Azzan Hospital in Habban. Yemeni security sources told Arabic news outlets that they assumed the car bomb was being set as part of an operation targeting Yemeni military or security personnel. They said that the Shabwa, Hadhramaut, Abyan, and Al Bayda provinces had been battlegrounds for al-Qaeda and Yemeni security personnel for over two years, and hundreds had died.

In early August 2014, fighting broke out in Habban and on the Shabwan border with Hadhramaut which left 12 Yemeni soldiers and nine AQAP soldiers dead. AQAP attacked government troops in Azzan on September 1, killing 13 and wounding 40. It captured Habban in mid-2015, expelling Yemenis loyal to President Abdrabbuh Mansur Hadi from the city. On April 17 of that year, two AQAP fighters were killed by a US airstrike in Habban; four AQAP fighters were killed in Shabwah by a US drone strike on 3 March 2016. On October 6, 2016, a US airstrike killed two al-Qaeda operatives.

== Azzan, lost and gained ==
On February 1, 2016, AQAP captured Azzan without resistance from the population or the Yemeni army. The group then began to establish its version of Sharia law (as it had done in Zinjibar, Jaʽār and another town), reportedly executing civilians for committing adultery. On March 30, 2016, a suspected US drone strike killed four AQAP soldiers manning a checkpoint on the outskirts of Azzan.

On April 25, 2016, pro-Hadi loyalists and UAE soldiers entered Azzan after AQAP retreated without resistance. A day before the AQAP withdrawal, a suspected US drone strike near Azzan killed nine AQAP fighters. Azzan was reportedly again under AQAP control on December 3, 2016.

== Other incidents ==
A reported U.S. airstrike killed four AQAP militants in al Aqlah on February 20, 2016. On March 4, another drone strike killed four more AQAP fighters. A reported U.S. airstrike killed three suspected AQAP militants in the Markhat Bahyan region of northwestern Shabwah Governorate on April 28. In early March 2017, a US strike killed 4 reported AQAP fighters in al-Saeed. A day later, US airstrikes killed at least 12 AQAP fighters and wounded civilians in the village of Wadi Yashbum. The home of senior AQAP leader Usayd al-Adani was struck by a drone, killing him. That night, US soldiers landed by helicopter and engaged in a half-hour gunfight with AQAP forces.
