= Ataq district =

Coordinates: 14.5633°N 46.8317°E

Ataq District مديرية عتق
- District
- Interactive map of Ataq District
- Country: Yemen
- Governorate: Shabwah

Population (2003)
  - Total: 37,315
- Time zone: UTC+3 (Yemen Standard Time)

Ataq District (Arabic: مديرية عتق) is a district of the Shabwah Governorate in Yemen. As of 2003, the district had a population of 37,315 inhabitants.
