= Hatib district =

Coordinates: 14.1800°N 46.4439°E

Hatib District
- District
- Interactive map of Hatib District
- Country: Yemen
- Governorate: Shabwah

Population (2003)
  - Total: 13,335
- Time zone: UTC+3 (Yemen Standard Time)

Hatib District (Arabic: مديرية حطيب) is a district of the Shabwah Governorate in Yemen. As of 2003, the district had a population of 13,335 people.
