= Merkhah Al Ulya district =

Coordinates: 14.4844°N 45.9297°E

Merkhah Al Ulya District مديرية مرخة العليا
- District
- Interactive map of Merkhah Al Ulya District
- Country: Yemen
- Governorate: Shabwah

Population (2003)
  - Total: 32,278
- Time zone: UTC+3 (Yemen Standard Time)

Merkhah Al Ulya District (Arabic: مديرية مرخة العليا) is a district of the Shabwah Governorate in Yemen. As of 2003, the district had a population of 32,278 people.
