= Merkhah As Sufla district =

Coordinates: 14.6997°N 46.1561°E

Merkhah As Sufla District مديرية مرخة السفلة
- District
- Interactive map of Merkhah As Sufla District
- Country: Yemen
- Governorate: Shabwah

Population (2003)
  - Total: 40,635
- Time zone: UTC+3 (Yemen Standard Time)

Merkhah As Sufla District (Arabic: مديرية مرخة السفلى) is a district of the Shabwah Governorate in Yemen. As of 2003, the district had a population of 40,635 inhabitants.
