= Al Talh district =

Coordinates: 15.0825°N 47.3514°E

Al Talh District
- District
- Interactive map of Al Talh District
- Country: Yemen
- Governorate: Shabwah

Population (2003)
  - Total: 9,404
- Time zone: UTC+3 (Yemen Standard Time)

Al Talh District (Arabic: مديرية الطلح) is a district of the Shabwah Governorate in Yemen. As of 2003, the district had a population of 9,404 inhabitants.
