= Emirate of Beihan =

1680–1967 state in southern Arabia

Emirate of Beihan إمارة بيحان
- State of the Federation of South Arabia
- 1680–1967
- Flag

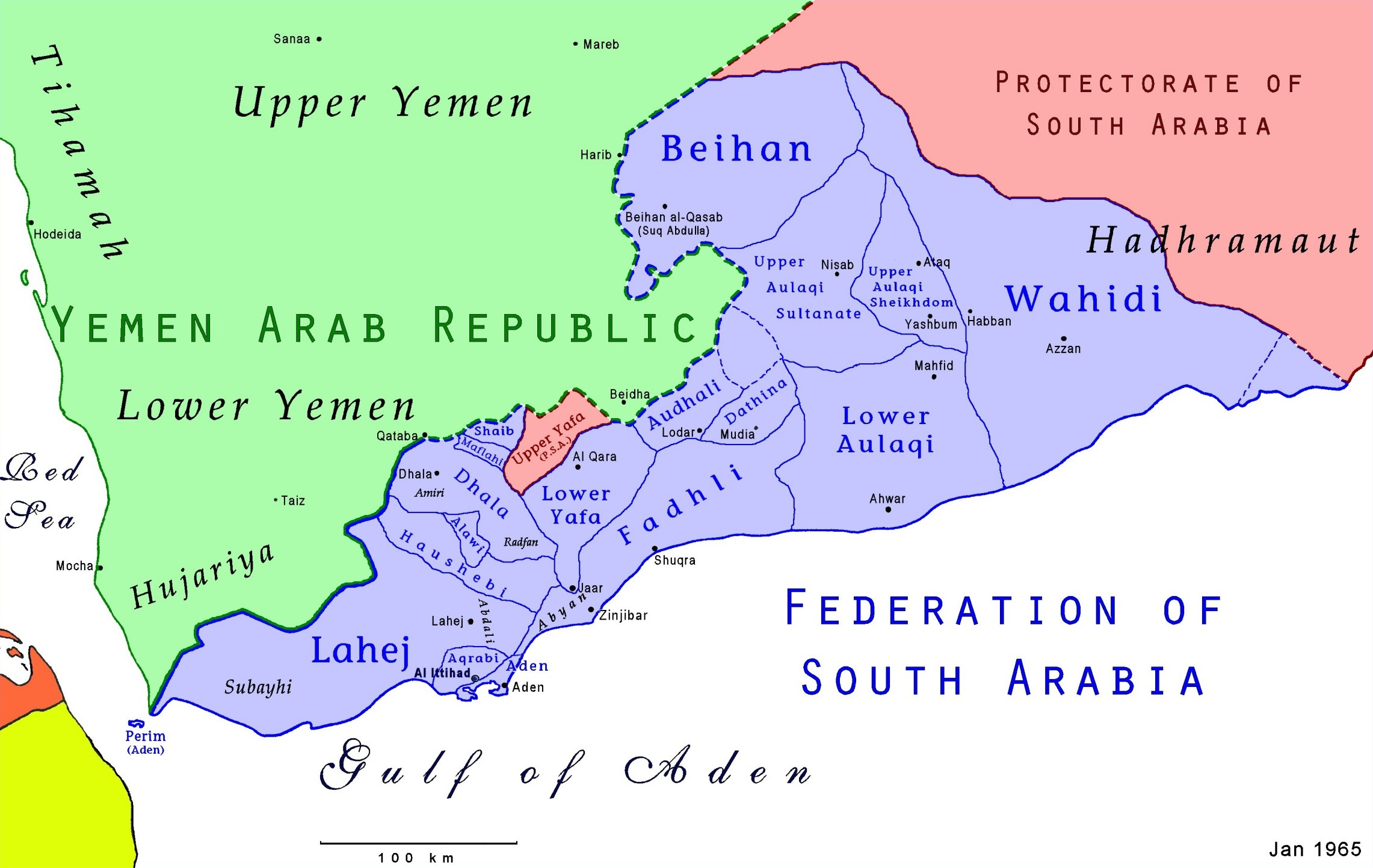
- Map of the Federation of South Arabia
- Capital: Suq Abdulla, (now Beihan)
- Area
  - Coordinates: 13°25′N 45°40′E
- Population
  - 1946: 6,000
  - Type: Monarchy
- History
  - Documented since: 1680
  - Disestablished: 1967
| Preceded by | Succeeded by |
| Federation of Arab Emirates of the South | South Yemen |

Beihan or Bayhan (Arabic: بيحان Bayḥān), officially the Emirate of Beihan (Arabic: إمارة بيحان Imārat Bayḥān), was a state in the British Aden Protectorate and the Federation of South Arabia. Its capital was Suq Abdulla, now called Beihan. The Emirate was abolished in 1967 upon the founding of the People's Republic of South Yemen and is now part of the Republic of Yemen.

== History ==
It was not until the question of demarcating the northeastern frontier of Beihan arose that the British would have any intercourse with it.

In December 1903 a treaty was concluded with Sharif Ahmed bin Muhsin. This treaty was considered to include the Ahl Masabein in its terms. He drew a monthly stipend of 30 dollars.

In June 1930 the troops of the Imam of Sanaa who had advanced to the Harib district, north-west of Beihan, with headquarters at Al Joba and Darb al Ali, began to encroach on Al Ain, which is inhabited by Masabi tribesmen.

In 1955, sometime before the 1st of July, Beihan settled a border treaty with North Yemen.

The emirate was abolished in 1967.

== Geography ==
Beihan lies to the north of the Beidha district and north-west of the Upper Aulaqi country. It lies on either side of the Wadi Beihan, in the valley of which the bulk of the population reside.

The lower portion of the Wadi Beihan is occupied by the Sharif and his relations together with the Bal Harith tribe and the upper portion by the Ahl Masabein, a powerful tribe, who form the bulk of the fighting men in Beihan.

The headquarters of the Sharif is at An Nuqub, of the Bal Harith at As Seilan and of the Masabein at Beihan al Qasab.

Beihan is a valley connected between Al Bayda in the north-west, Ma'rib in the east and Ataq in the south. It is a fertile valley irrigated by water streams fall from the northern mountains as well as from the dug wells. The main cultivated crops are dates, cereals and citrus and people depend on livestock to a large extent to survive. Nonetheless, people increasingly adopt trade and exchange commerce; in addition to incorporate to the government business.

== Inhabitants ==
Bayhan valley historically had several main groups. The Musabein Tribe living in the south which was dominated by Al-Saleh (Ahmed Saif tribe) and the Alfatima (Naji Alawi tribe). These two factions were engaged in constant feuds. Historically the middle of the valley was populated by the Al-Habieli family, descendants of the Prophet, who arrived in the valley in the late 1600s. They had been sent by the Imam of Yemen to protect the trade routes.

The Al-Habieli family are direct descendants of the first, al Hadi Yahya bin Hussein, and seventh, Qassim al Mansur bin Abdullah, Imams of Sanaa.

The north of the valley was dominated by the Balharith Tribe who were also continuously fighting one another as to who was their paramount sheik and like the Masabin also split into 2 main branches.

In 1931, the population was estimated at 11,000.

== Rulers ==
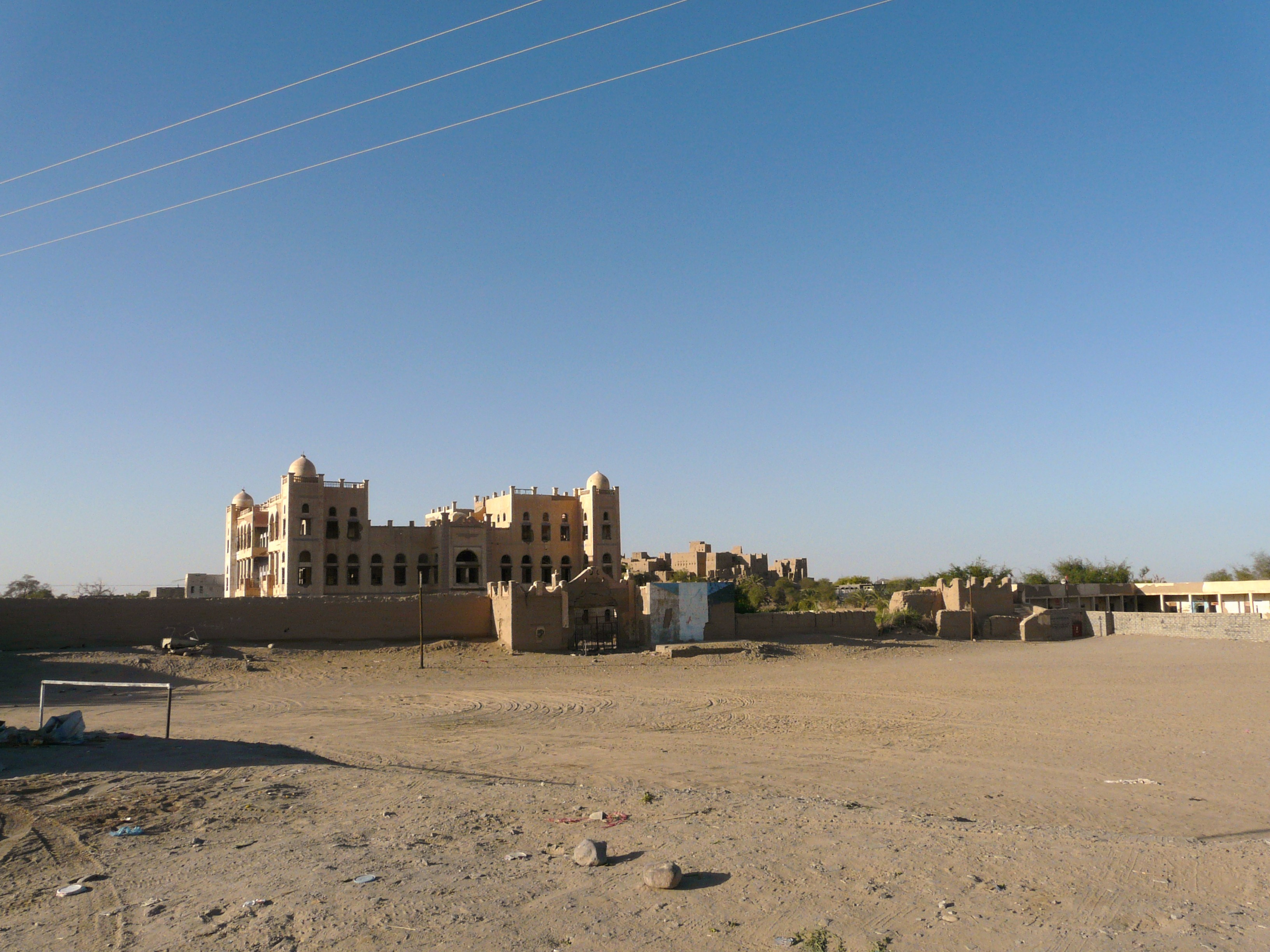
Kasr al-Sultan Palace in Beihan

The ruling Al-Habieli family, recognized by the Hashimite Grand Sharifs of Mecca as related, established themselves as religious leaders in Bayhan in 1680 and became independent. The Hashemite Emirate of Bayhan was included in the Western Aden Protectorate before joining the Federation of Arab Emirates of the South on 11/2/1959 and the Federation of South Arabia on 4/4/1962. The Emirate was abolished by revolutionary Yemen in 7/1967 (the People's Republic of South Yemen on 30/11/1967). Capital was Naqub. Al Amir ( Prince ) Khalid Saleh Hussein Al-Habieli is current dynastic head of the family.

=== Emirs ===
The former rulers were:

- Muqbil, 1st Amir of Bayhan 1680-
- Emir Hasan.
- Emir Ghaib c.1750 - 1800 Amir Ghalib.
- Emir Hussein c.1800 - 1820 Amir Hussein.
- .... - .... Emir al Habieli.
- Emir Thaifallah.
- Emir Mubarak.
- .... - 1903 Emir Muhsin
- Sharif Emir Ahmad Muhsin Al Habieli, Amir of Bayhan 1903-abdicated 1935, independent c 1900. Father of: HE
- Sharif Sultan Hussein Ahmad Al Habieli, Regent of the Hashemite Emirate of Bayhan 1935-1967, formerly Minister of Interior of the Federation of South Arabia. HE Sharif Hussein was married to Halima, daughter of the Sheikh of the Musabein tribe. Their son,
- HH Sharif Emir Saleh Bin Hussein Al Habieli (1935-Feb 2010), Emir of Bayhan, deprived of ruling powers on 28/8/1967 by revolutionary Yemen (the People's Republic of South Yemen on 30/11/1967).

- Prince Khalid Bin Saleh Bin Hussein Al-Habieli. Current Prince ( Feb 2010–Present ).

== See also ==
- Aden Protectorate
- List of Sunni Muslim dynasties
