= Al-Qatn =

Coordinates: 15°50′N 48°27′E

- Interactive map of Al-Qatn
- Country: Yemen
- Governorate: Hadhramaut
- Time zone: UTC+3 (Yemen Standard Time)

Al-Qatn is a village in east-central Yemen. It is located in the Hadhramaut Governorate.

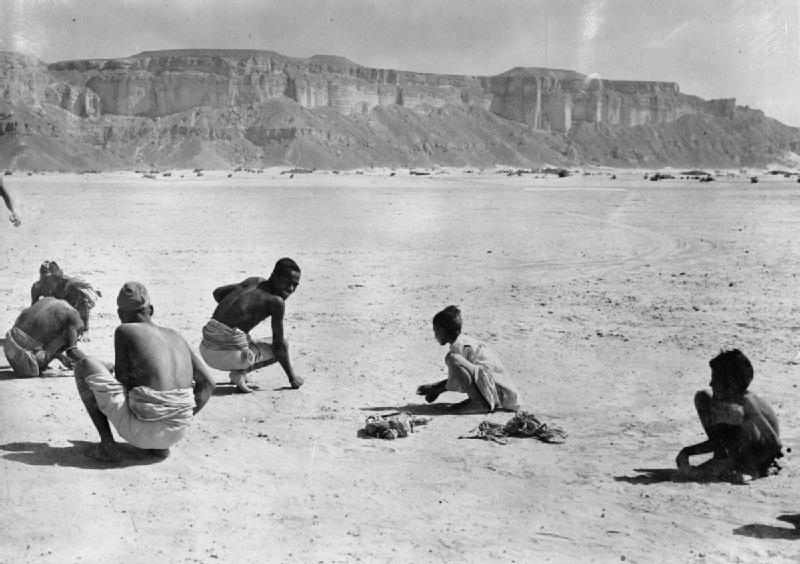
Al-Qatn
