= Zadok Ben-David =

Israeli sculptor working in London

- צדוק בן-דוד
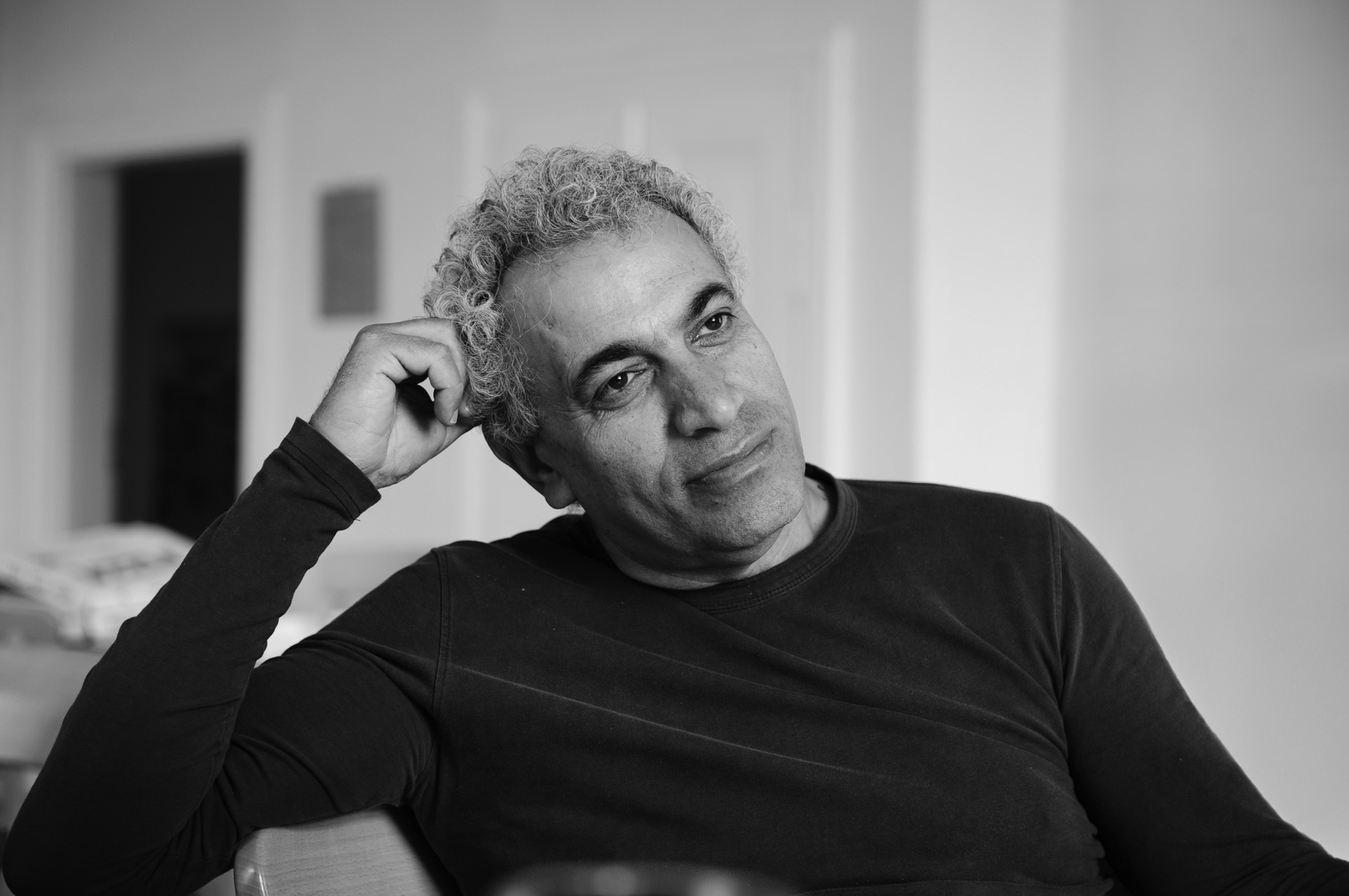
- Born: 1949 (age 76–77); Beihan, Aden Protectorate
- Occupation: Artist
- Years active: 1988-present

Zadok Ben-David (Hebrew: צדוק בן-דוד; born 1949) is an Israeli artist working in London. He was born in Beihan, Yemen; his family immigrated to Israel when he was an infant. He studied at the Bezalel Academy of Art and Design from 1971 to 1973. He continued his studies at the University of Reading and Saint Martin's School of Art, where he studied sculpture and later taught, from 1977 to 1982.

In 1988, Ben-David represented Israel in the Venice Biennale.

He has received many awards, including the Grande Biennial Prémio at the XIV Biennale Internacional de Arte de Vila Nova de Cerveira in Portugal in 2007, and the Tel Aviv Museum prize for sculpture 2005. In 2008, he was commissioned to make a sculpture for the Beijing Olympics.

Since 1980, Ben-David has had more than forty solo exhibitions. His works are held in the collections of public and private institutions in Europe, East Asia, the United States, Israel and Australia.

== Exhibitions ==
- "Nature Reserve" at the Shirley Sherwood Gallery, Kew Gardens, 2021–22
- "Blackfield" at Artclub 1563 from 1 December 2011
- "Blackfield" at Verso Arte Contemporanea, 2010
- "Human Nature" at the Tel Aviv Museum of Art, 2009–10
- "Blackfield" at the Shoshana Wayne Gallery, 2009
- "Blackfield" at Annendale Galleries, 2008
- "Four Seasons" at the Sotheby's, Hanover Square, London, 2008
- "Invinsible Reality" at the Guangdong Museum of Art, Guangzhou, China, 2007

== Gallery ==
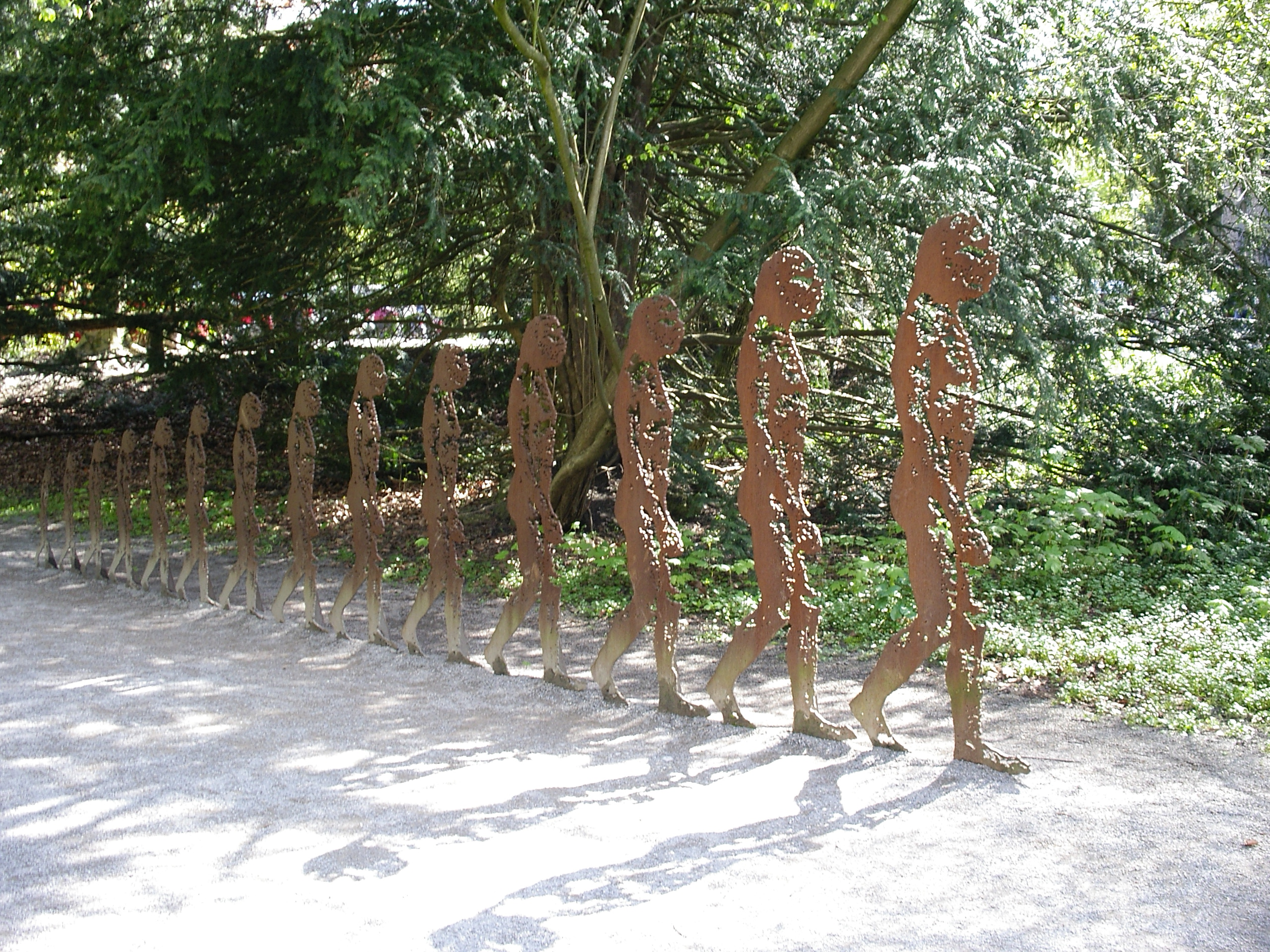
"The Man Who Never Ceased to Grow" (2006), sculpture by Zadok Ben-David, Neanderthal Museum, Neandertal, Germany

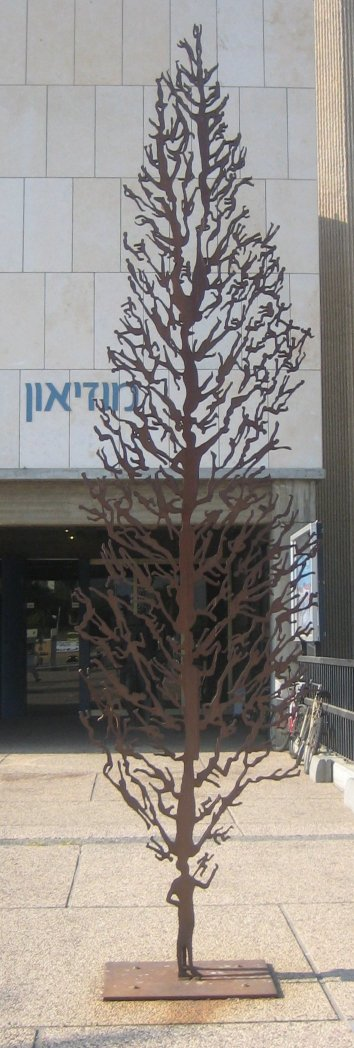
"Lone Cypress", Cor-ten steel sculpture by Zadok Ben-David (2006), Tel Aviv Museum of Art, Tel Aviv, Israel

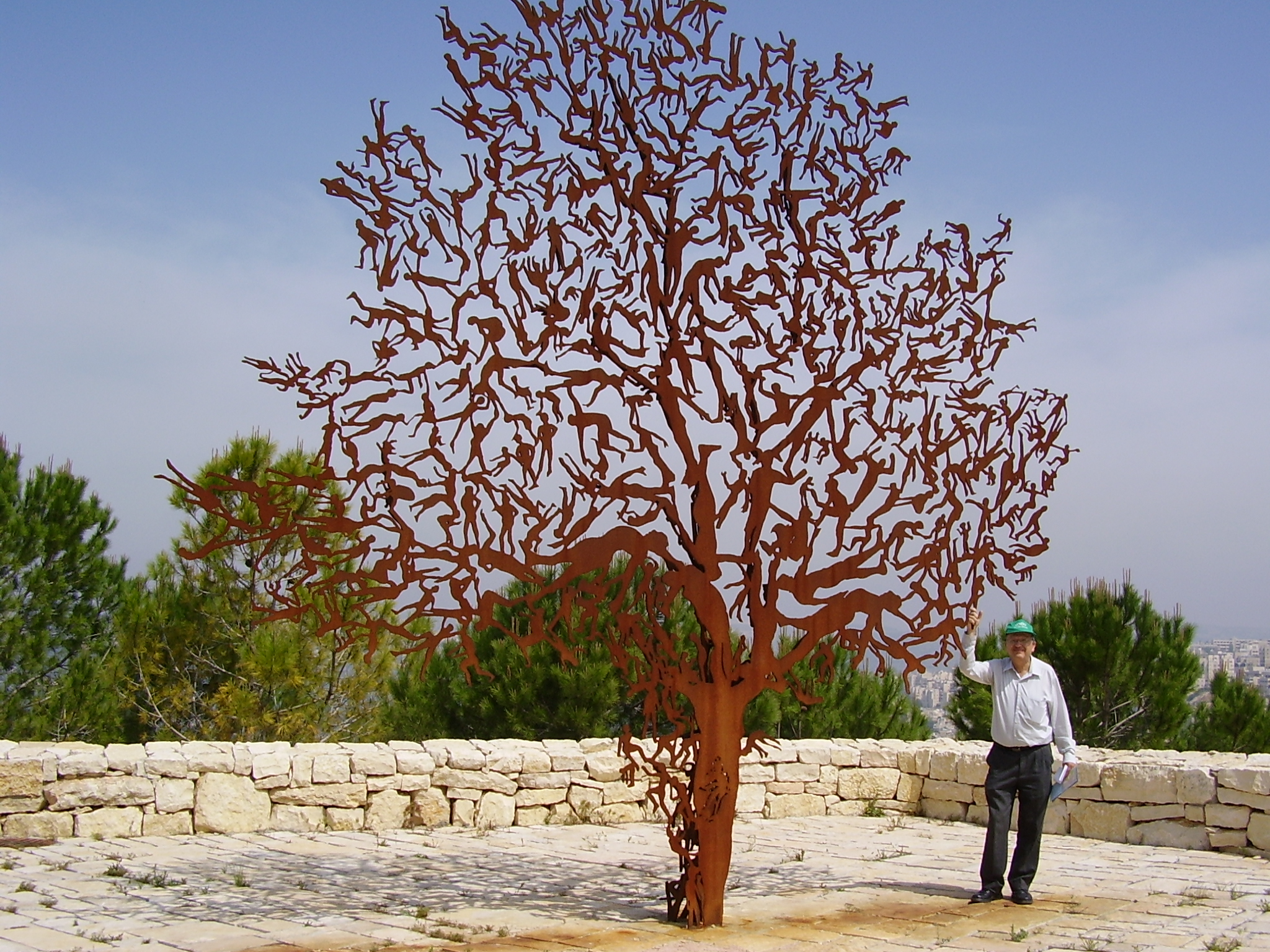
"For is the tree of the field a man", Partisans' Panorama, Yad Vashem, Jerusalem
