= Southern Giants Brigades =

Pro-government militia in the Yemeni Civil War

- ألوية العمالقة الجنوبية
- Emblem of the Southern Giants Brigades. The Arabic inscription translates: "Allah (God) is the greatest, The Southern, Giants Brigades"
- Leader: Abu Zara'a
- Ideology: Salafism
- Size: 20,000 – 30,000
- Part of: Yemeni Joint Forces
- Website: alamalika.net

The Southern Giants Brigades (Arabic: الوية العمالقة الجنوبية, romanized: Alwiyat al-Amaliqa al-Janubia) is a pro-government militia in Yemen. Its fighters are predominantly tribesmen from southern Yemen, particularly from the Lahej, Abyan and Dhale governorates.

They include Salafi students of Muqbil al-Wadi'i's Dar al-hadith religious institute in Dammaj, Saada that were expelled by the Houthis in early 2014. The militia is commanded by Abd al-Rahman Abu Zaraa al-Muharrami, a Salafi who studied at the ultraconservative Dammaj religious school. The United Arab Emirates removed him in 2019 in favour of a rival, then reinstated him in 2020.

The militia is part of the Yemeni Joint Forces and is the largest faction in the formation. The Giants Brigades also received extensive support from the United Arab Emirates militarily and financially. Lavishly supplied with tanks, artillery, modern armour, guided missiles and drones, and backed by Emirati air and naval power, they earned a reputation as Yemen’s best-equipped ground force.

== History ==
The brigades were originally in the former North Yemeni military since the early 1970s. After Yemen unified, these brigades saw intensive action in the 1994 civil war and continued to be an effective unit in the Yemeni military. The original Giants Forces are no longer officially present and have been broken up and distributed in different areas over the years. The current Giants Brigades are a relatively new force in Yemen. They emerged from the Southern Resistance that fought the Houthis in the South at the beginning of the conflict in 2015. They have shown their military power during the Al Hudaydah governorate offensive, where they have killed hundreds of Houthi militants.

In May 2018 the militia alongside Arab coalition forces took control of several pockets in Taiz from the Houthis, in the fighting several Houthi fighters were killed and several pieces of their equipment were either damaged or destroyed. After taking control of the "Mocha Interception" in the city the militia alongside allied forces including other factions in the Joint Forces, the Tihamah Resistance and Yemeni National Resistance they began to advance towards the "Bara Junction" to cut the Houthis' supply lines.

Although many members of the Giants Brigades are known to be Salafists, most of them are first and foremost southerners.

In December 2021, the Giants announced it had sent troops to Shabwah Governorate "to liberate areas that fell into Houthi hands", driving out the rebels in just two weeks. They also seized southern areas of neighbouring Marib province, where the rebels and loyalists have been engaged in a months-long battles to seize its strategic capital city. After completing military operation Storm of the South the Southern Giants announced the redeployment of its forces after having "completed its mission" and that its troops remain on the frontlines ready to repel any Houthi attacks.

On 7 April 2022, the Yemeni President Abdrabbuh Mansur Hadi issued an order dismissing Vice President Ali Mohsen al-Ahmar and delegating his powers to a newly formed presidential council to lead the country through a transitional period. The leader of the Giants Abu Zara'a is a member of this leadership council.

In August 2023, the Giants stormed the Al-Maashiq presidential palace in Aden and manhandled the prime minister to impose their preferred appointments. The following year, they raided a presidential office. They have also taken control of revenue-generating assets, including Aden’s airport company and free zone, as well as oil and gas facilities in Shabwa, while their commanders have built business empires.

On 16 July 2026, they said that they had intercepted a boat carrying weapons manufacturing equipment for the Houthis.

== Support from the United Arab Emirates ==
The UAE pays the fighters’ salaries, with soldiers earning at least 1,000 Saudi riyals a month, and supplies their arsenals with weapons, including Chinese arms channelled through Abu Dhabi. Several Giants commanders reside in the UAE, and some have even been granted Emirati citizenship. In return, Abu Dhabi gains a loyal and capable force protecting the approaches to Bab el-Mandeb, one of the world’s key maritime chokepoints, while securing influence over the future of southern Yemen and its ports, which have long been central to Emirati maritime ambitions.
