= War on the Rocks =

American national security publication

War On The Rocks
- Industry: Media and news
- Founded: 2013; 13 years ago
- Founder: Ryan Evans
- Website: warontherocks.com

War on the Rocks (WOTR) is an American news commentary website offering articles and podcasts on national security issues, featuring experienced professionals.

== History ==
Ryan Evans, a former think tanker and Defense Department civil servant, founded WOTR in 2013 as a podcast. It launched as a full fledged publication in July of that year. He sought to re-center experienced voices in a media landscape that was becoming increasingly dominated by more mass-media oriented content and ubiquitous clickbait. The publication's opening article was written by former SACEUR James Stavridis. Contributors generally include experienced national security personnel, such as military personnel, military veterans, current and former government officials, and academics. The site hosts expert analysis and does not break news or publish leaked documents. It has also been selected for inclusion in the web archives of the Library of Congress.

Its audience includes many of the same sorts of people who write for WOTR, among them the highest levels of leadership in the U.S. military, who regularly appear on main WOTR podcast. In late 2013, Evans interviewed Chairman of the Joint Chiefs of Staff Martin Dempsey for Dempsey's first-ever podcast interview. Dempsey believed WOTR was the best way to reach a rank-and-file listenership. A year later, WOTR partnered with the National Consortium for the Study of Terrorism and Responses to Terrorism at the University of Maryland to publish infographics on country-specific terrorism trends, showcasing its focus on data-driven security analysis. In 2019, WOTR received a $40,000 grant from the MacArthur Foundation to support its podcast production.

== Funding ==
WOTR was originally bootstrapped with a $4,450 Kickstarter campaign and later a $61,846 Indiegogo campaign. Evans also raised $100,000 in late 2015 from an angel investor. In 2017, the site launched a paid membership program. In 2017, WOTR and the University of Texas launched the Texas National Security Review, a hybrid journal that combines a section featuring peer-reviewed scholarly works with another that features essays by policymakers and practitioners. In February 2025, War on the Rocks handed over full operations of the Texas National Security Review to the University of Texas.

== Competitors ==
Similar outlets with a national security focus include the Modern War Institute at the United States Military Academy, Small Wars Journal, and Defense One.
