= Bayhan district =

Bayhan District مديرية بيحان
- District
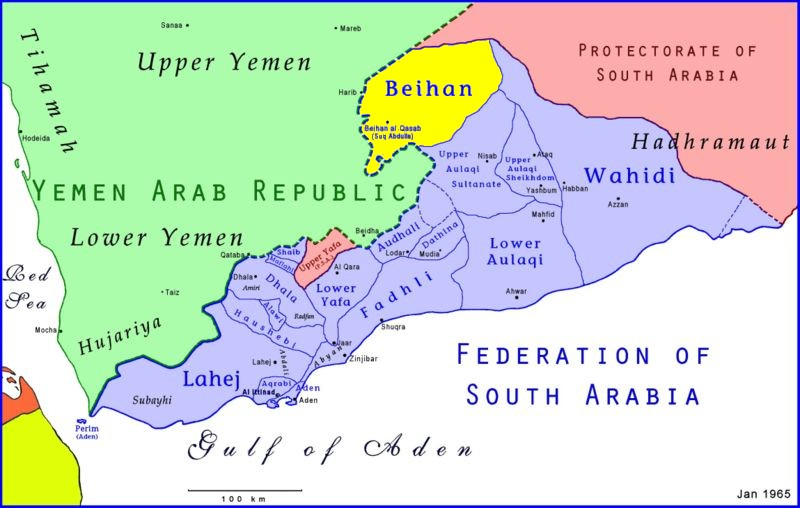
- Bayhan emirate in the Federation of South Arabia

- Location in Yemen
- Coordinates: 14.799239°N 45.717974°E
- Country: Yemen
- Governorate: Shabwah

Population (2003)
  - Total: 48,347
- Time zone: UTC+3 (Yemen Standard Time)

Bayhan District (Arabic: مديرية بيحان) is a district of the Shabwah Governorate in Yemen. As of 2003, the district had a population of 48,347 inhabitants.

== Location ==
Bayhan District covers 616 square kilometres (238 sq mi).The district is just east of Harib and north of al-Baydha. It is bordered by Marib to the north west, and Hadhramaut to the east. It roughly corresponds to the Wadi Bayhan, which runs down from the Yemeni highlands in a northeast direction into the Ramlat al-Sab`atayn desert. The Wadi persists for about 45 miles (72 km) from the mountain front. It crosses the Ramlat as Sab'atayn and emerges on the Jaww Kudayf Al 'Ubaylet. The district takes its name from the former Emirate of Beihan. The principal town is Beihan.

== History ==
The Wadi Bayhan and neighboring Wadi Harib made up the Qataban trading state in ancient times. The Qataban state, which fell around 400 AD, lay on the Frankincense Trail. It had a highly developed system of spate irrigation. There are records of the rise of a Jewish messiah near Bayhan during the reign of Sultan 'Amir ibn 'Abd al-Wahhab (1488-1517) of the Tahiride dynasty. The messianic pretender rode horses with saddles decorated in silver, and organized the people who gathered around him into a military force. The Sultan crushed the movement and killed many Jews around 1495 or 1500.

More recently, Wadi Bayhan was the scene of clashes between the British and the Ottoman Turks, and then between the British and the Hamid al-Din imams. The Hashimite rulers of the Bayhan emirate were connected to the royal family of Jordan. They made a treaty of protection with Britain early in the 20th century, and an advisory agreement with the British in the 1940s. (Note: The Sharif of Bayhan is reported to have said, "In any dealing with the British it is better to be their enemy than their friend. If you are their friend, they will sell you. If you are their enemy, there is a good chance they will buy you.) Sharif Husayn bin Ali Bayhan, the ruler of the emirate, sided with the royalists against the republicans in the North Yemen Civil War. In 1967 the emirate was abolished by the National Liberation Front. Sharif Husayn made an unsuccessful attempt to regain control of Bayhan by force in early 1968. From the late 1960s until the 1980s the Wadi Bayhan saw fighting between forces of the two Yemens.

== Demographics ==
Bayhan traditionally had two main tribes, the Balharith and the Massabain. Sharif Haydar al-Habili, who became the first Arab commander of the FRA in June 1967 when it became the South Arabian Army, came from the Amirate of Bayhan. As of 2004 the district had 5,348 houses with 5,481 families. There were 24,863 males and 23,476 females for a total of 48,347. Population density was 78 people per square kilometer.

== Traditional industry ==
Bayhan has long been a center for craft industries. Until relatively recently cotton and indigo were grown in fields in the Bayhan wadi, and many villagers spun and wove cotton or dyed it with indigo. In the mid-20th century hundreds of people were employed in the dying industry in Bayhan, the main industry of the district. In the late 1980s there were still some dyers in Bayhan using natural indigo. The indigo, once cultivated, now grew wild. The leaves could be dried and then stored in sacks for years. Dyers could make up dye as needed, about monthly, in clay pots called zirs from Habban, Shabwa.

== Sources ==
- Balfour-Paul, Jenny (2012-10-02). Indigo in the Arab World. Routledge. ISBN 978-1-136-60324-2.
- Brehony, Noel (2013-04-15). Yemen Divided: The Story of a Failed State in South Arabia. I.B.Tauris. ISBN 978-1-78076-491-7.
- Burrowes, Robert D. (2010). Historical Dictionary of Yemen. Rowman & Littlefield. ISBN 978-0-8108-5528-1.
- Geukens, F. (1966). "Geology of the Arabian Peninsula". United States Geological Survey Professional Paper. U.S. Government Printing Office.
- Klorman, B. Z. Eraqi (1993). The Jews of Yemen in the Nineteenth Century: A Portrait of a Messianic Community. BRILL. ISBN 90-04-09684-1.
- "shabwa". National Information Center, Yemen. Archived from the original on 2014-06-27.
