= Rasad district =

Coordinates: 13°35′N 45°15′E

Russed District
- District
- Interactive map of Russed District
- Country: Yemen
- Governorate: Abyan

Population (2003)
  - Total: 54,825
- Time zone: UTC+3 (Yemen Standard Time)

Rasad District is a district of the Abyan Governorate, Yemen. As of 2003, the district had a population of 54,825 inhabitants.
