= Beihan =

Beihan بيحان
- Town
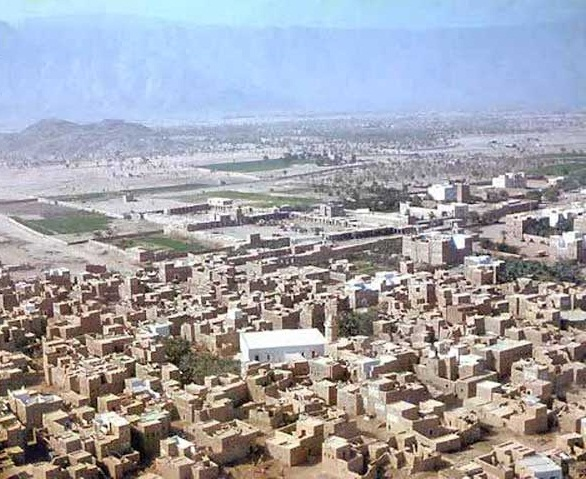
- Beihan in the 1960s

- Location in Yemen
- Coordinates: 14°48′N 45°44′E
- Country: Yemen
- Governorate: Shabwah
- District: Bayhan

Population (2004)
  - Total: 13,234
- Time zone: UTC+3 (Yemen Standard Time)

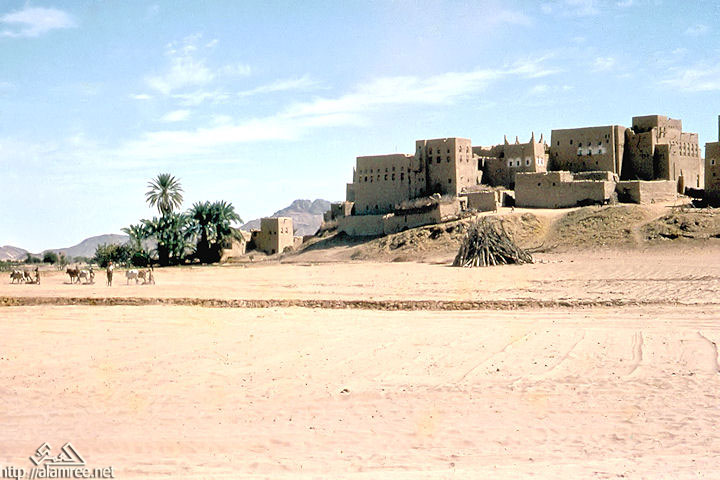
Beihan from the ground.

Beihan (Arabic: بيحان), also known as Bayhan al Qisab (بيحان القصاب), is a town in western Yemen. The town had 13,234 inhabitants as of 2004. It was formerly the capital city of Emirate of Beihan, and today is the capital of Bayhan District in the Shabwah Governorate.

== Overview ==
Geographically, Beihan is a valley connected between Al Bayda in the north-west, Ma'rib in the east and Ataq in the south. It is a fertile valley irrigated by water streams fall from the northern mountains as well as from the dug wells. The main cultivated crops are dates, cereals and citrus and people depend on livestock to a large extent to survive. Nonetheless, people increasingly adopt trade and exchange/commerce, in addition to incorporate in government business.

Bayhan valley historically had several main groups. The Musabein Tribe living in the north was dominated by the Alsaleh (Ahmed Saif tribe) and the Alfatima (Naji Alawi tribe). These two factions were in consistent feuds. The South of the valley was dominated by the Balharith Tribe who were also continuously fighting one another as to who was their paramount sheik and like the Masabin also split into 2 main branches. Bayhan al Qisab, also known as Beihan, is a place of Masabine tribe.

Socially, Beihan comprises different societal composition. The main is the tribe of Masabin and tribe of Belharith; in addition to a lesser number of Sada and Ashraf (the two latters claim they descended from the Islamic prophet, Muhammad). Moreover, social stratification in Beihan is sharp; namely, it has less notably societal elements also; such as slaves and weak people, who depend on tribal influential families for protection. Nonetheless, over time, the most wealthy merchants in Beihan come from among the weak people because tribesmen used to disdain trading.

Historically, the paramount sheikh of Masabin tribe, Ahmed Saif and later his son Abdelqader, used to be the real rulers of the region and their ancestors before them. This status, for political reasons related to the British policy in the south Arabia, was changed. The consequences of such policy resulted in placing sheriff Hussein firmly in power for the first time in 1943 until the independence in 1967. The elimination of sheikhs Ahmed Saif and his son Abdeqader by assassination to pave the way for the implementation of the above-mentioned British policy still has tragic resonance among Masabin tribesmen. However, with the Marxist regime seized power in south Arabia in 1967 all notables flew outside the country, mainly to Saudi Arabia, which lasted until the aftermath of 1994 that resulted in defeating the Yemeni Socialist Party in the civil war. Beihan now is a part of the central Yemeni government and represented in the parliament by one MP.

Beihan comprises different societal layers. The main tribes are those of Masabin and Belharith. In addition to a lesser number of Sada and Ashraf (the two latter claim they descend from Muhammad), the majority of the population, consists of non-tribal large families who have lived in Bayhan for hundreds of years.

There was also a Jewish presence in Beihan. The Jews were brought to Israel in 1949.

== Notable natives ==
- Zadok Ben-David – Israeli artist

== See also ==
- Emirate of Beihan
- Timna (The historical name of Beihan)
