= Ar Rawdah district =

Coordinates: 14.4956°N 47.2744°E

Ar Rawdah District
- District
- Interactive map of Ar Rawdah District
- Country: Yemen
- Governorate: Shabwah

Population (2003)
  - Total: 27,371
- Time zone: UTC+3 (Yemen Standard Time)

Ar Rawdah District (Arabic: مديرية الروضة) is a district of the Shabwah Governorate in Yemen. As of 2003, the district had a population of 27,371 inhabitants.
