= Rudum district =

Coordinates: 14.0375°N 47.8381°E

Rudum District
- District
- Interactive map of Rudum District
- Country: Yemen
- Governorate: Shabwah

Population (2003)
  - Total: 23,244
- Time zone: UTC+3 (Yemen Standard Time)

Rudum District (Arabic: مديرية رضوم) is a district of the Shabwah Governorate, Yemen. As of 2003, the district had a population of 23,244 inhabitants.
