= Ain district =

Coordinates: 14.9503°N 45.6003°E

Ain district مديرية عين
- District
- Interactive map of Ain district
- Country: Yemen
- Governorate: Shabwah

Population (2003)
  - Total: 22,051
- Time zone: UTC+3 (Yemen Standard Time)

Ain district (Arabic: مديرية عين) is a district of the Shabwah Governorate in Yemen. As of 2003, the district had a population of 22,051 inhabitants.

== Overview ==
Ain district is located in the northwestern part of Shabwa, near the district of Hareeb in the Marib province. It is one of the fastest-growing areas in the governorate.

Most of Ain district's population are traders and herders and work in the agricultural sector. Many local residents have also emigrated to other Gulf Arab states.

The most well represented tribes in the directorate include: Al-Aslam, Al-Ashiebi, Al-Ayyash, Al-Amar, Al-Aqil and Al Bothaiev.
