= Usaylan district =

Coordinates: 15.1703°N 46.0272°E

Usaylan District مديرية عسيلان
- District
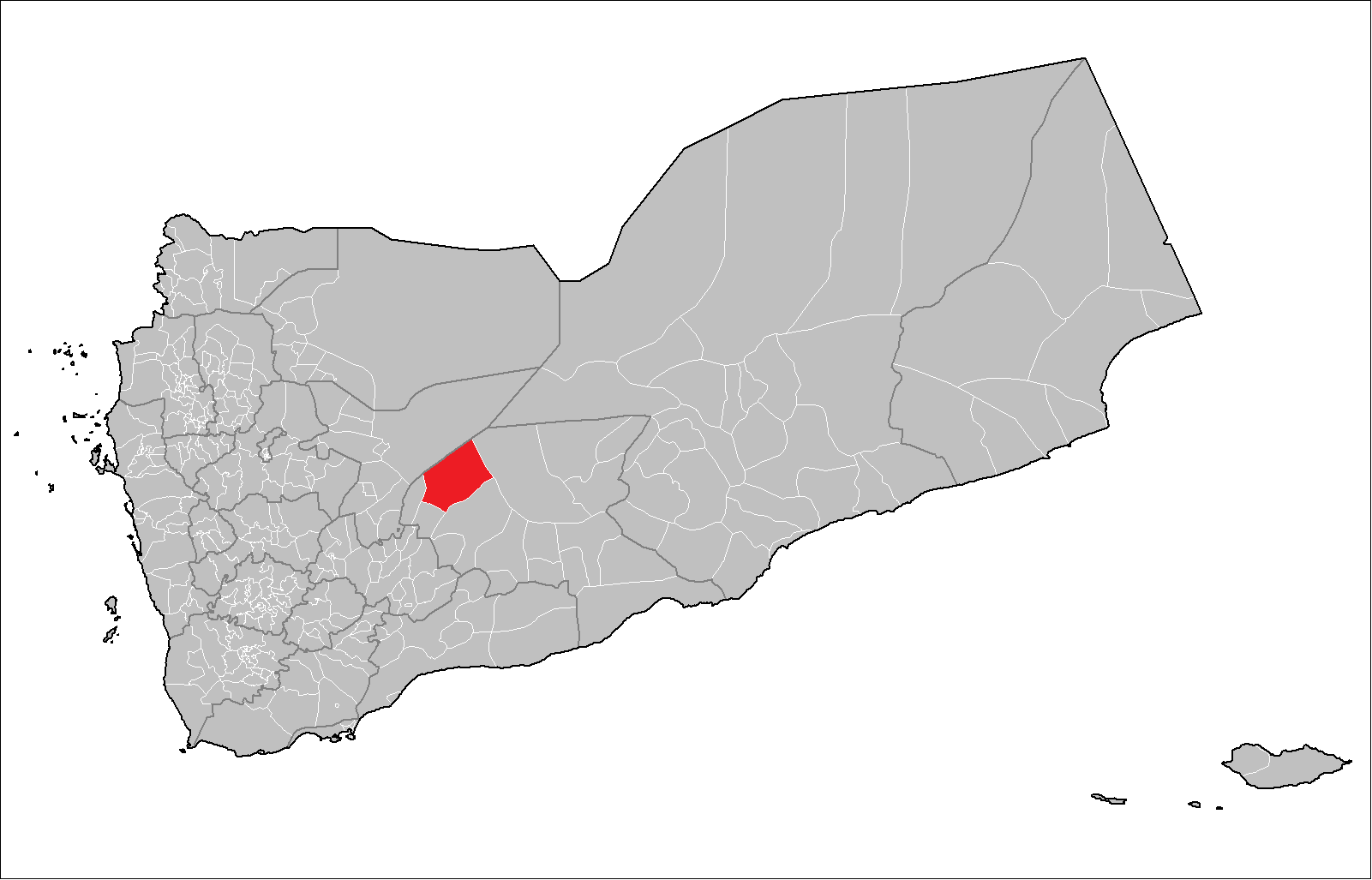
- Country: Yemen
- Governorate: Shabwah

Population (2003)
  - Total: 31,518
- Time zone: UTC+3 (Yemen Standard Time)

Usaylan District (Arabic: مديرية عسيلان) is a district of the Shabwah Governorate in Yemen. As of 2003, the district had a population of 31,518 people.
