= As Said district =

As Said District مديرية السعيد
- District
- Interactive map of As Said District
- Coordinates: 14.2764°N 46.8692°E
- Country: Yemen
- Governorate: Shabwah

Population (2003)
  - Total: 35,034
- Time zone: UTC+3 (Yemen Standard Time)

As Said District (Arabic: الصعيد, romanized: Aş Şa‘īd) is a district of the Shabwah Governorate in Yemen. As of 2003, the district had a population of 35,034 inhabitants.
