= Mayfa'a district =

Coordinates: 14.3978°N 47.7403°E

Mayfa'a District
- District
- Interactive map of Mayfa'a District
- Country: Yemen
- Governorate: Shabwah

Population (2003)
  - Total: 41,597
- Time zone: UTC+3 (Yemen Standard Time)

Mayfa'a District (Arabic: مديرية ميفعة) is a district of the Shabwah Governorate in Yemen. As of 2003, the district had a population of 41,597 inhabitants.
