= Habban district =

Coordinates: 14°42′N 45°44′E

Habban district مديرية الحبان
- District
- Interactive map of Habban district
- Country: Yemen
- Governorate: Shabwah

Population (2003)
  - Total: 29,846
- Time zone: UTC+3 (Yemen Standard Time)

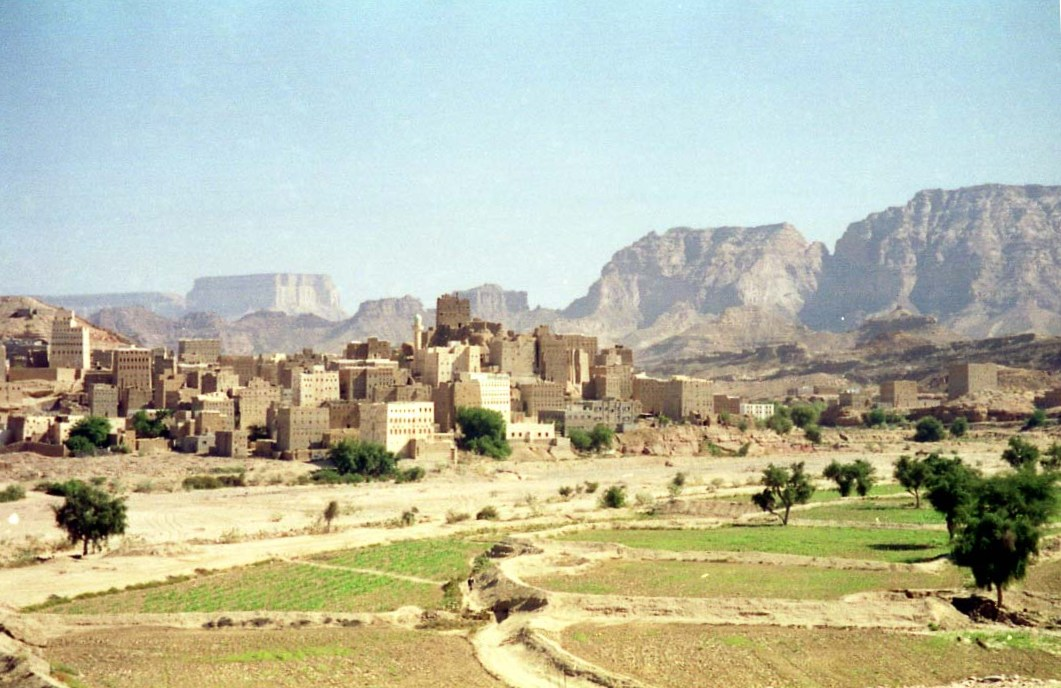
The town of Habban

Habban District (Arabic: مديرية حبان) is a district of the Shabwah Governorate in Yemen. As of 2003, the district had a population of 29,846 inhabitants. The district takes its name after the town Habban which lies in As Said District, located at 14^{o}21'N. latitude, 47^{o}04'E. longitude. The town is some 275 km east by northeast of Aden by air (425 km overland by the most common route), some 75 km inland from the Gulf of Aden.

Habban, during the period of Wahidi Sultanate, was a trading town of several thousand, located on the western border of the Wahidi Sultanate, which, for the British, defined the boundary of Eastern and Western Aden Protectorate., made very few visits to the area and despite the presence of "air-fields" at nearby 'Ataq and Mahfid, with rare exceptions, left political and military control of the area to the local authorities.

The district was once the home of many Jews, who have since migrated to Israel.

== See also ==
- Wahidi Sultanate of Habban
- December 1998 tourist kidnappings in Yemen
