= Ataq =

Ataq City عتق
- City
- Ataq
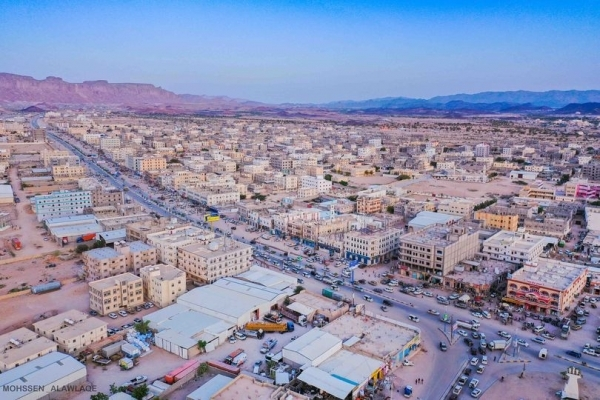
- Part of old Ataq city with some modern buildings.

- Location in Yemen
- Coordinates: 14°32′11″N 46°49′59″E
- Country: Yemen
- Governorate: Shabwah Governorate
- Established: 1931

Area
  - Total: 1,300 km^{2} (500 sq mi)
- Elevation 1129: 1,146 m (3,760 ft)

Population (2004)5012
  - Total: 37,315
  - Density: 28.7/km^{2} (74/sq mi)
- Time zone: UTC+3

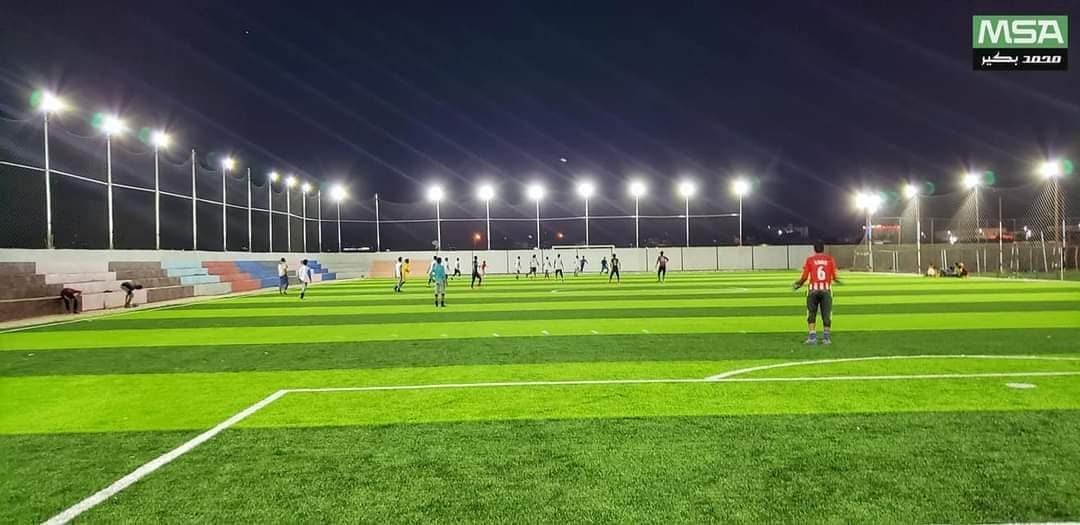

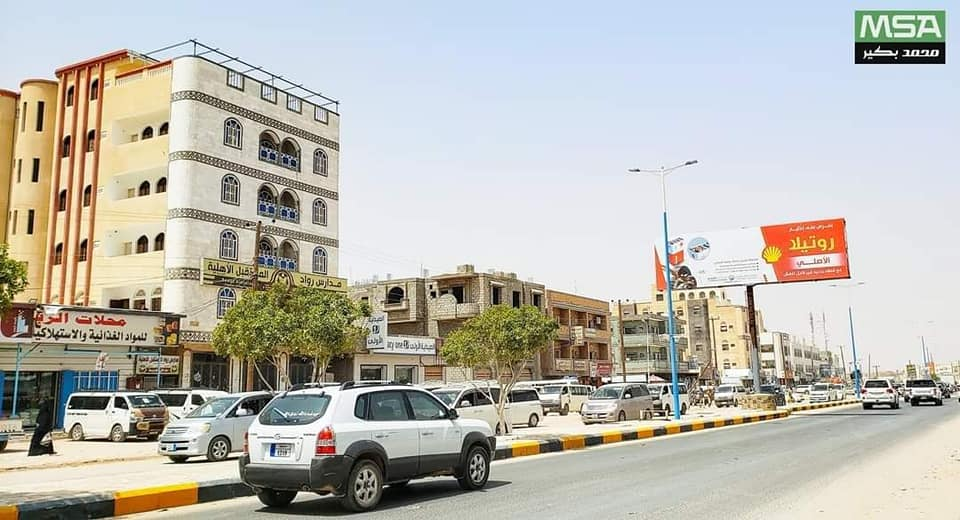

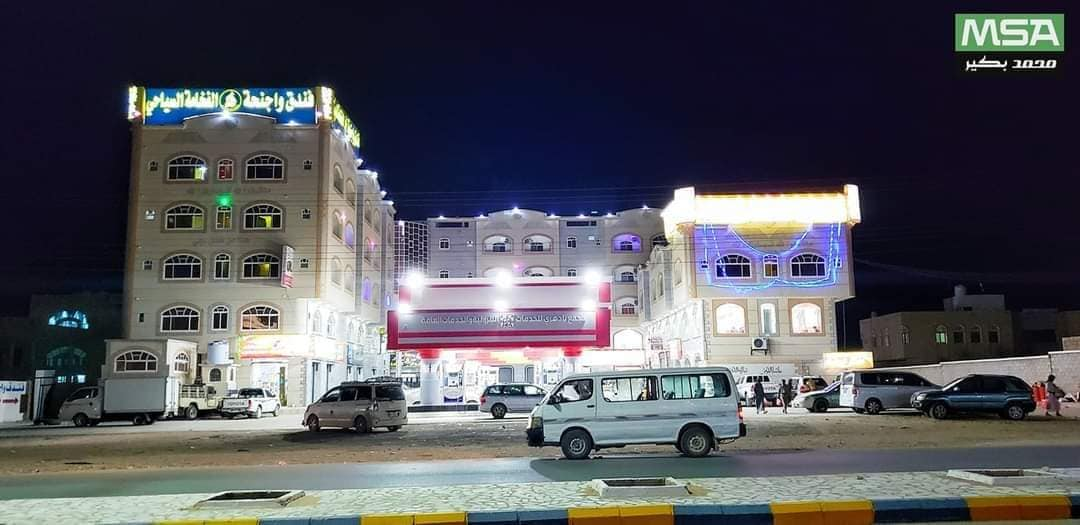
Ataq City, Shabwah مدينة عتق شبوة

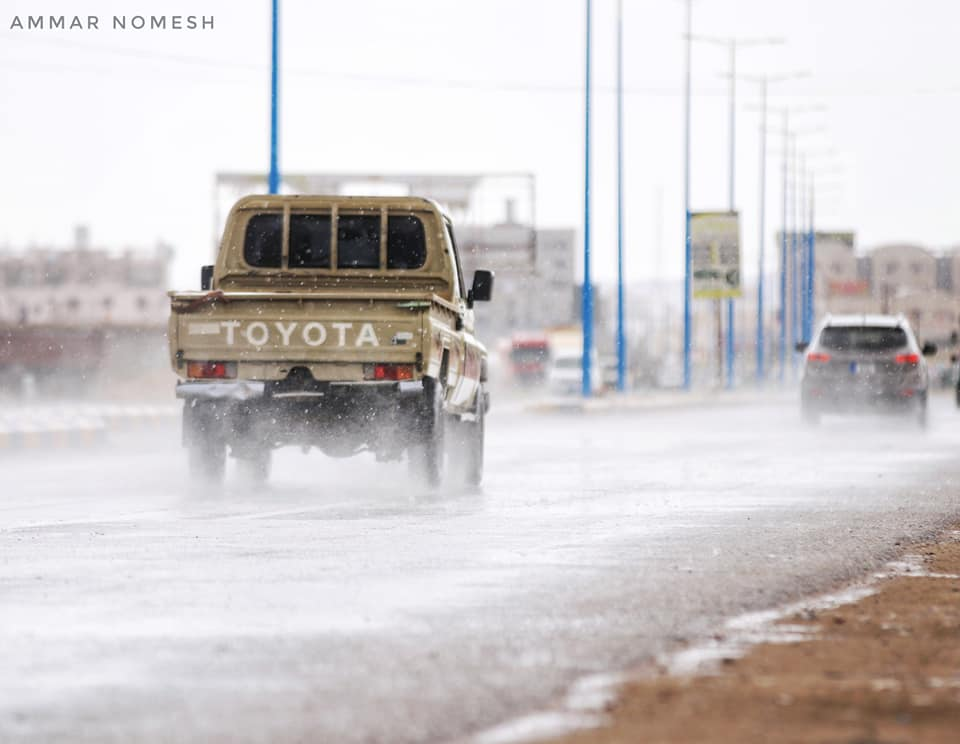
Ataq City, Shabwah مدينة عتق شبوة

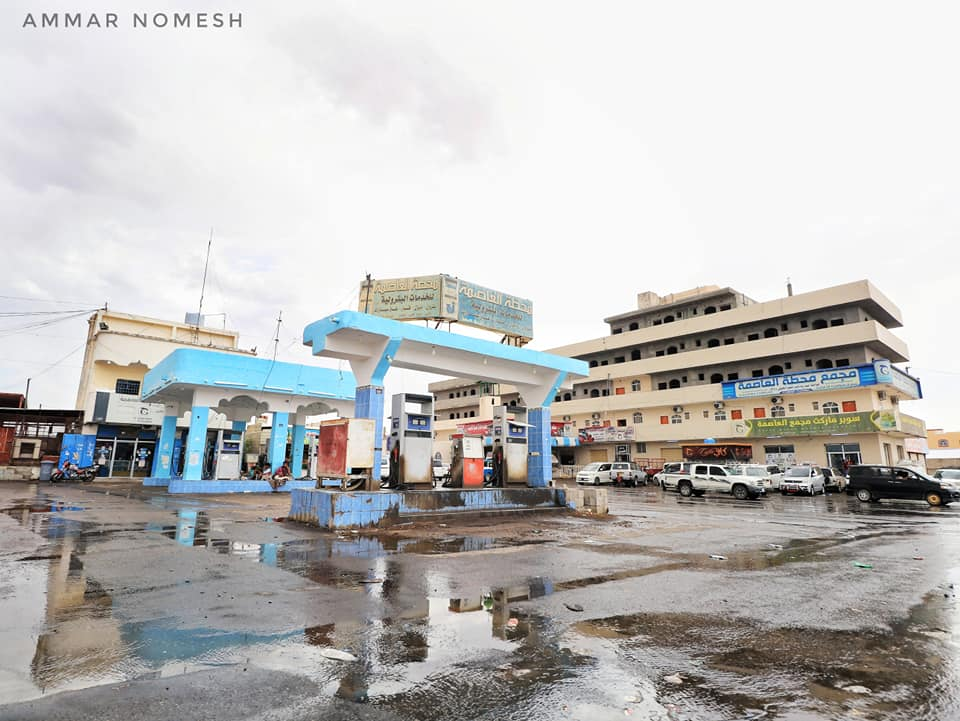
Ataq City, Shabwah مدينة عتق شبوة

Ataq (Arabic: عتق), alternately spelled Attaq, is a small city and the capital of Shabwah Governorate in Yemen. Ataq is 458 km south east of Sanaa. The difference in elevation of the city is about 70 m with generally partially flat topography with altitudinal variation in the range of 1120–1190 m.a.s.l. Its population was around 37,315 according to a 2004 census. On May 24, 1994, Ataq was seized by northern Yemeni forces. According to the Geo Names Database, Ataq is located at an altitude of 1146 metres. It is served by Ataq Airport; the landing strip is located to the north of the town. Armed forces loyal to exiled president Abdrabbuh Mansur Hadi captured Ataq from the Southern Transitional Council in August 2019.

== Landmarks ==
Ataq is described by Lonely Planet as "not at all like an inland Yemeni town"; other publications have described it as Beau Geste in appearance and "completely different" and surrounded by desert.

It contains the Shabwa Museum, and an old souk and the Banata Specialist Hospital are located to the south-eastern part of the town which geographically stretches from the northwest to the southeast. Dubai Hotel and Suites has a hotel in the town centre. Military camps are located in the western part. Approximately 50% of the buildings in Ataq have two storeys and the population is spread across 70-80% of the city area.

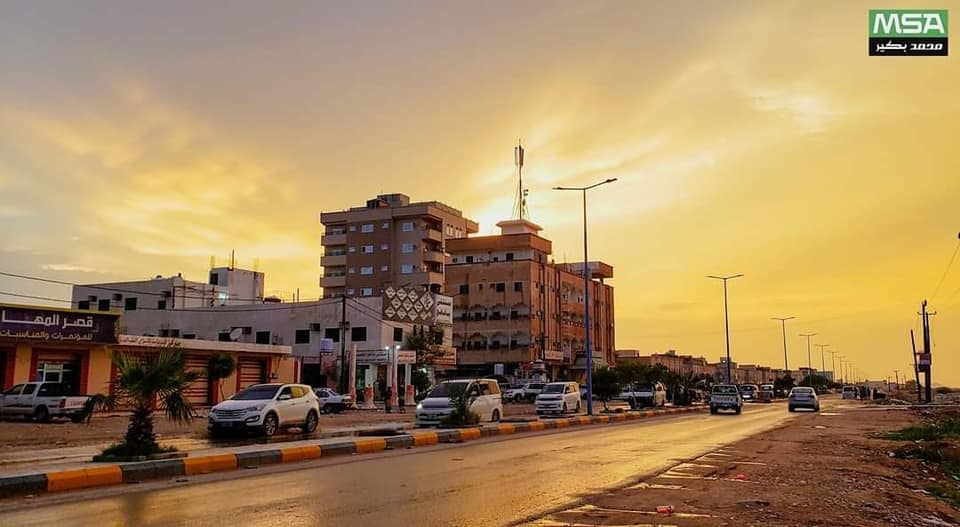
Ataq City, Shabwah مدينة عتق شبوة

=== Shabwa Museum ===
Ataq contains the regional museum of the Shabwah Governorate, the Shabwa Museum. The museum contains important items related to the prehistoric heritage of the area and contains many items unearthed by M. L Inizan. In particular it contains relics from the ancient city of Shabwa, the capital of the ancient kingdom of Hadhramaut and items unearthed from the archaeological sites of the ancient Qataban and Osan kingdom.

The airport contains a technical tower, electricity station and fire brigade building.

== Urban development ==
In order to improve and create sustainable development conditions in Ataq city, in respect of water and wastewater aspects the Yemen Government launched a project to meet population growth projected to 2025, with funds provided by International Development Agency (IDA).

== Climate ==
Ataq has a hot desert climate (Köppen climate classification: BWh).

Climate data for Ataq
Month	Jan	Feb	Mar	Apr	May	Jun	Jul	Aug	Sep	Oct	Nov	Dec	Year
Mean daily maximum °C (°F)	23.0 (73.4)	23.7 (74.7)	25.4 (77.7)	27.0 (80.6)	29.3 (84.7)	31.0 (87.8)	30.2 (86.4)	29.3 (84.7)	28.3 (82.9)	26.7 (80.1)	24.3 (75.7)	23.4 (74.1)	26.8 (80.2)
Daily mean °C (°F)	16.6 (61.9)	17.6 (63.7)	19.6 (67.3)	21.3 (70.3)	23.5 (74.3)	24.9 (76.8)	25.0 (77.0)	24.1 (75.4)	22.9 (73.2)	20.2 (68.4)	17.9 (64.2)	17.1 (62.8)	20.9 (69.6)
Mean daily minimum °C (°F)	10.3 (50.5)	11.6 (52.9)	13.8 (56.8)	15.7 (60.3)	17.7 (63.9)	18.9 (66.0)	19.9 (67.8)	18.9 (66.0)	17.6 (63.7)	13.7 (56.7)	11.5 (52.7)	10.9 (51.6)	15.0 (59.1)
Average precipitation mm (inches)	4 (0.2)	4 (0.2)	8 (0.3)	11 (0.4)	8 (0.3)	1 (0.0)	13 (0.5)	23 (0.9)	9 (0.4)	1 (0.0)	1 (0.0)	2 (0.1)	85 (3.3)
Source: Climate-Data.org
