= Shabwah Governorate =

Governorate of Yemen

Coordinates: 14°33′N 46°50′E

Shabwah محافظة شَبْوَة
- Governorate
- Country: Yemen
- Capital: Ataq

Government
  - Governor: Mohammed Saleh bin Adeow

Area
  - Total: 47,584 km^{2} (18,372 sq mi)

Population (2025 est.)
  - Total: 720,901
  - Density: 15.150/km^{2} (39.239/sq mi)

Shabwah (Arabic: شَبْوَة, romanized: Šabwa) is one of the governorates of Yemen. Located in the south central part of the country, it is approximately 474 km (295 mi) from the national capital Sana'a. It covers an area of approximately 47,584 km^{2} (18,372 sq mi) and is subdivided into 17 districts. Its capital is Ataq. According to the 2004 census, it had a population of 470,440, and had an estimated population of 720,901 in 2025.

== History ==
The ancient city of Shabwa was founded in the second millennium BCE and served as the capital of the Kingdom of Hadhramaut from approximately from the first millennium BC to the 3rd century CE. It was an important centre along the Incense Route, through which frankincense and other commodities were transported between the Arabian peninsula and the Mediterranean. The region also contains archaeological remains of the capital cities associated with the ancient kingdoms of Qataban and Awsan, the historical city of Mayfa'a, and the Roman port city of Qana.

The region was settled by Yemeni Jewish communities before they migrated to Israel in the late 1940s. It formed part of the British Protectorate of Aden till 1967, after which it was incorporated into the People's Democratic Republic of Yemen. The region saw fighting during the South Yemeni crisis in 1986 and it later became part of the unified Republic of Yemen in 1990. It again experienced fighting during the Yemeni Civil War in 1994, driven by competition for control of lucrative oil resources. The governorate also saw protests during the 2011 Arab Spring.

During the Yemeni Civil War, Shabwah experienced fighting between Houthi-aligned forces and forces of the internationally recognised government. The Houthis and the forces aligned with Ali Abdullah Saleh briefly controlled most of the governorate, including its capital Ataq. As a part of the Shabwah Campaign in August 2015, forces loyal to the government of Abd Rabbah Mansour Hadi defeated the Houthis to retake most of the territory. The fighting continued sporadically until the death of Saleh in 2017. Al-Qaeda had controlled pockets of rural territories since the early 2010s. The Southern Transitional Council ousted the government forces in 2019.

== Geography ==
Shabwah is one of the governorates of Yemen. It is located on the south central part of the country, approximately 474 km (295 mi) from the national capital Sana'a. It is bordered by Hadhramaut Governorate to the east, Marib Governorate to the north, and Abyan Governorate and Al-Bayda Governorate to the west. It occupies an area of approximately 47,584 km^{2} (18,372 sq mi), and is the third largest governorate by area in Yemen. It has its seat at Ataq.

The topography consists of the Ramlat al-Sab'atayn desert in the northeast and coastal deserts along the Arabian Sea coast in the south flanking highlands and valleys in the central and northwestern portions of the governorate. The governorate has about 300 km (190 mi) of coastline. It often experiences extreme weather events including heat waves.

== Administration and sub-divisions ==
The governorate is administered by a local council consisting of 17 members and the governor. Al Mahwit Governorate is divided into 17 districts.

Districts
District	Size (km²)	Population		
District	Size (km²)	Total	Male	Female
Ain	824	34,606	17,600	17,006
Al Talh	2,395	14,329	7,288	7,041
Ar Rawdah	2,856	42,546	21,636	20,910
Arma	6,742	15,392	7,826	7,566
As Said	823	45,482	23,133	22,349
Ataq	1,3	77,991	39,668	38,323
Bayhan	616	73,677	37,474	36,203
Dhar	1,212	15,008	7,633	7,375
Habban	908	45,547	23,167	22,380
Hatib	851	19,700	10,019	9,681
Jardan	3,443	23,108	11,753	11,355
Mayfa'a	3,37	60,060	30,548	29,512
Merkhah Al Ulya	2,591	50,209	25,537	24,672
Merkhah As Sufla	2,591	61,601	31,331	30,270
Nisab	2,15	63,891	32,498	31,393
Rudum	6,68	28,501	14,496	14,005
Usaylan	3,232	49,253	25,054	24,199
Total	42,584	720,901	366,661	354,240

== Demographics ==
According to the 2004 population census, Shabwah had a population of 470,440. The population was estimated to be 568,000 in 2011. According to a 2025 estimate, its population was approximately 720,901, including 354,240 females and 366,661 males.

== Economy ==
Major agricultural produce include fruits and vegetables, and the governorate contributes approximately 2% to Yemen's total crop production. The economy is based on fishing along the coast. Apiculture and livestock rearing also contribute to rural livelihoods. It is one of Yemen's important oil-producing governorates, with Balhaf at the eastern end of the coast housing the Balhaf liquified natural gas export terminal and Bir Ali used for oil exports. In 2014, central government grants and subsidies accounted for approximately 98% of the governorate's general revenue, while locally generated revenues contributed 2%. The poverty rate was estimated at 42%.
