= Operation Golden Swords =

2012 offensive in Yemen

- Part of the South Yemen insurgency
- Map of Yemen showing Abyan Governorate.
Date	12 May – 23 June 2012 (1 month, 1 week and 4 days)
Location	Zinjibar and Jaʿār, Abyan Governorate, Yemen
Result	Yemeni government victory: 2012 Sana'a bombing; Government forces recapture Zinjibar, Jaar and Shuqrah in mid-June; Militants pull back to Azzan in Shabwah Governorate, then abandon it peacefully on 17 June; AQAP and its allies return to an insurgency campaign in Abyan and neighboring provinces

Belligerents
(Yemen) Yemeni Government; Supported by: United States; Saudi Arabia	Al-Qaeda in the Arabian Peninsula; Ansar al-Sharia

Commanders and leaders
(Yemen) Abdullatif Al-Sayed (Yemen) Gen. Salem Ali Qatan † (Yemen) Brig. Gen. Muhammad Nasir Ahmad Ali (Yemen) Saleh al-Ahmar	Abu Hamza al-Zinjibari; Nasir al-Wuhayshi; Said Ali al-Shihri; Qasim al-Raymi; Ibrahim al-Asiri; Qaed al-Dahab (WIA) Sheikh Hatim al Moqbil

Strength
2,000 fighters (Zinjibar)	Thousands of troops, backed by tanks and fighter jets Local tribal militias

Casualties and losses
78 soldiers, 26 tribal fighters killed	429 militants killed
- 34 civilians killed

Operation Golden Swords was an offensive by the Yemeni military against Islamist militant forces, possibly including elements of al-Qaeda in the Arabian Peninsula (AQAP), in the province of Abyan with the purpose of re-capturing the militant-held towns of Zinjibar and Jaʿār.

On 12 May, the military started the offensive in an attempt to recapture all areas of Abyan out of their control. Over a month of fighting, 567 people were reportedly killed, including 429 Islamist fighters, 78 soldiers, 26 tribal fighters and 34 civilians. On 12 June the Yemeni army succeeded in retaking Zinjibar and Jaar, pushing the militants away after heavy clashes in and around both towns. The city of Shuqrah fell on 15 June, and militants retreated towards neighboring Shabwah Governorate.

== Background ==
The Yemeni revolution (2011–2012) caused widespread unrest across Yemen as protestors demanded the resignation of longtime president Ali Abdullah Saleh. The Yemeni Armed Forces were split between those who remained loyal to Saleh and cracked down on the uprising, and those who backed the protestors and joined the opposition. The government redeployed most Saleh-loyalist security forces across the country, including in southern Yemen, to more populated urban areas including the capital of Sanaa in order to maintain control.

Al-Qaeda in the Arabian Peninsula's traditional strongholds are positioned in southeastern Yemen. Abyan Governorate and other areas of southern Yemen have long been sources of Islamic extremism since many locals fought alongside the Afghan mujahideen before the area became a common training ground for militants on their way to participate in the Iraqi or Somali insurgencies. Prior to the revolution, AQAP had never attempted to control and administer large population centres, insteading remaining in remote, mountainous areas in the south. However, divisions in the military and the government's preoccupation with maintaining control in urban centres created a security gap which it exploited.

On 27 March 2011, militants from the group seized Jaar and its surrounding areas as army units fled their posts. Later in April, AQAP announced the creation of Ansar al-Sharia, a local rebrand which would attract people in areas under their control through its work and ideology. On 27 May, amid fighting between security forces and pro-opposition tribesmen in Sanaa, Ansar al-Sharia invaded and seized Zinjibar, the capital of Abyan Governorate, after the army and other security forces abandoned the city. An offensive launched by the army and allied tribesmen in July eventually culminated in the "liberation" of the city in September according to officials, though only the northern and eastern parts were under government control. A stalemate proceeded into the end of the year. Separately, militants also seized the town of Shuqrah in August, as well as Azzan in neighbouring Shabwah Governorate in June and al-Rawdah in September.

Saleh was accused by the opposition of letting Abyan be overran by militants in order to increase his importance to the counterterrorism-focused United States and save his regime. His attempts would fail as he was forced to resign and ceed power to Abdrabbuh Mansur Hadi in February 2012. In response to his inauguration, the militants launched a string of attacks culminating in an assault on army installations in the towns of Dofas and al-Kawd on 4 March, killing 185 soldiers. On 9 April, Ansar al-Sharia launched an attack on the strategic town of Lawdar, instigating an intense battle for it.

== Prelude ==
Control in Yemen on 11 March 2012

On 5 May, in his first public speech since his inauguration, Hadi promised a new offensive against the militants, stating:

"The real battle against the terrorist al-Qaeda organization has yet to begin and will not end until we have eradicated their presence in every district, village and position; it will not end until internally displaced citizens are assured that they can return safely to their homes and organized terrorist operatives have surrendered their weapons and rid themselves of ideologies that contradict the sacred values of the Islamic religion."

On 8 May, U.S. State Department spokesman John Kirby confirmed that the US had "begun to reintroduce small numbers of trainers into Yemen." The first soldiers reportedly arrived on 11 May.

On 9 May, Defense Minister Mohammad Nasser Ahmed visited a number of military installations across the south to review combat readiness before the offensive. During his visit, he met with 201st Mechanized Brigade commander Gen. Mahmoud al-Subaihi and 119th Infantry Brigade commander Gen. Faisal Rajab before giving a speech to the soldiers. He also visited the Southern Military Region commander Gen. Salem Ali Qatan at Badr Air-force Camp in Aden alongside Governor Waheed Ali Rashid.

== Timeline ==
Map of Yemeni army advances in Zinjibar

=== 12 May to 19 May ===
The offensive began on 12 May with the participation of 25,000 soldiers from eight military brigades. The 25th Mechanized Brigade, stationed in Zinjibar's outskirts, the 201st Mechanized Brigade, the 119th Infantry Brigade, the 31st Armored Mechanized Brigade, the 115th Infantry Brigade, and the 39th Armored Brigades from the Southern Military Region were the first to advance, while the 135th Infantry Brigade, part of the First Armored Division in Sanaa, and the 111th Infantry Brigade stationed in Lawdar joined later. The Yemeni Air Force launched raids on militant targets before the army moved in on the ground. It also dropped leaflets on Lawdar, Mudiyah and al-Wade'a district urging locals to not cooperate with the militants in order avoid being bombed. An airstrike early morning in Jaar killed three militants and one civilian. Attacking from the west, the army reached the Kadama area on the outskirts of Jaar. The army moved in on Zinjibar from three directions supported by the air force and the navy. Clashes in the areas lead to the deaths of six militants and two soldiers, including one colonel, while 12 other soldiers were injured.

On 13 May, air raids across Abyan lead to the deaths of at least 30 militants. In Jaar, militants took refuge from the airstrikes inside government buildings in the town center. At dawn, army forces launched an assault on the al-Hurur area west of Zinjibar, pushing out the militants as government forces destroyed captured army vehicles, including nearly a dozen tanks and vehicles mounted with rocket launchers. The capture of al-Hurur positioned the army just outside of Jaar. Clashes around Zinjibar and in the nearby town of al-Kawd killed 12 soldiers. Government forces reached the Shaddad Fort, around three kilometres east of the city, and Zinjibar Bridge, just one kilometre south of the city. Militants reportedly blew up an oil pipeline in Mayfaa district, Shabwah, in retaliation to losses from the offensive. An attempted attack on the northern gate of the al-Anad Air Base near the living quarters was repelled, though one military officer was killed.

On 14 May, heavy fighting erupted in the al-Jabalain area near Jaar as army forces attempted to advance on the town. A Yemeni jet misfired and accidentally struck civilians in the city, wounding two children. An airstrike on a vehicle travelling on the outskirts of Lawdar killed six militants, while 10 militants were killed by airstrikes on their hideout in Shuqrah. Six army soldiers were killed during clashes in Zinjibar.

On 15 May, the military began launching airstrikes on Jaar, five days after it dropped leaflets on the town warning civilians to avoid militant hideouts. The first attack targeted a house and killed two militants. A later air raid killed 12 people from a group of civilians which gathered around the house after the initial strike, and injured 21. Later airstrikes in the town killed 11 militants. The army arrested 25 militants on motorcycles in the area. Clashes in al-Jabalain continued until early in the day, killing at least eight militants and one soldier, and leading to the arrest of two Somali militants. The Yemeni Army had managed to push into the center of Zinjibar, while air force helicopters flew over the city for the first time since its seizure, indicating that the militants had lost their anti-air capability. In Lawdar, eight Popular Committee fighters and eight soldiers were killed, including Colonel Qasim Dabwan of the 111th Infantry Brigade, who was killed by a militant sniper. Popular Committee spokesperson Ali Ahmed said that security forces had pushed the militants "further away from the southern and western entrances of the city." Clashes in the strategic Yusuf Mountain area which overlooks Lawdar left 12 militants, five Popular Committee fighters, and two soldiers dead after the military launched airstrikes on militant hideouts in the area. Government forces seized the hilltop after intense fighting.

On 16 May, militants fired artillery at government forces stationed on the hilltop of the Yusuf Mountain, killing two armed tribesmen and wounding four. The army launched a counterattack in response, killing 11 militants in clashes atop the mountain. Government forces eventually captured the mountain by 11:00 as the militants had retreated. Airstrikes on a farm in Mudiyah destroyed two vehicles and killed at least 16 militants, including top local commander Samir al-Fathani. Hit-and-run battles between security forces and militants in Zinjibar left four soldiers dead, while a Jordanian surgeon was arrested on suspicion he was heading to join the militants in Zinjibar. A military officer stated that the army was advancing towards the southeast entrance of the city.

On 17 May, the military stated that it was advancing in Zinjibar backed by artillery and airstrikes. Yemeni officials stated that the offensive in Zinjibar had slowed down in part due to poor intelligence, leading to uncertainty as to whether most militants in the city were dead, fled the battle or strategically withdrew in preparation for a counteroffensive. The bodies of 11 soldiers and tribal fighters were found in an area the militants retreated from near Lawdar, seemingly killed execution-style. Later in the day, the Yemeni Defense Minister announced that Lawdar had been cleared of militants and was fully secured, ending the battle in the area. Local residents celebrated in the streets as some fired guns into the air. An airstrike in Shuqrah killed six suspected militants.

On 18 May, the military began a two-pronged attack on Jaar as army forces moved in and clashed with militants about 10 kilometers north of the town, killing eight of them. According to the military, the army made "notable advances" west of Jaar and were situated near an ammunition depot controlled by the militants in the vicinity of the town. Five militants were killed by armed tribesmen as they prevented them from passing through their village northwest of Jaar. Airstrikes on Shuqrah killed three militants and wounded six.

On 19 May, clashes about six miles from Jaar left 12 soldiers and 22 militants dead. Sporadic fighting continued in the area as the air force launched raids on the city. Officials claimed that government forces were in control of the western outskirts of Jaar and were about one kilometer from the city. Two militants were killed and six others were captured by government forces outside of the city. A surprise attack on a military post in the Rahwat al-Hisan area south of Jaar killed five soldiers and injured four, while army retaliation killed six militants. Separately, militants destroyed two army tanks in Abyan, killing their operators.

=== 20 May to 27 May ===
On 20 May, overnight clashes on the western outskirts of Jaar killed 13 militants and five tribal fighters, and wounded an additional four. According to local residents, an overnight militant ambush held off an army advance from the west, while Ansar al-Sharia claimed that it had conducted three raids in the area near Jaar. The air force launched four strikes on al-Rabwa, at Jaar's western entrance, killing several militants. Airstrikes were also launched on a factory on the northern edge of the city which was being used as a base by the militants, killing at least nine. Witnesses reported seeing 18 vehicles loaded with militants from Azzan being sent to reinforce Jaar. A statement written by AQAP leader Nasir al-Wuhayshi surfaced on jihadist internet forums in which he urged militants to fight to the death. His statement was largely perceived by analysts as an admission of defeat according to the Yemen Post.

On 21 May, clashes took place at night at the western entrance of Jaar, leaving 11 militants and three soldiers dead, and 17 soldiers wounded. Clashes erupted in the northeast of Zinjibar as an attack on a military base in Wadi Hassan, east of the city, killed seven soldiers and wounded 23. In the capital of Sanaa, a suicide bombing killed 96 soldiers at a military parade rehearsal for the upcoming Unity Day. Ansar al-Sharia claimed responsibility for the bombing, calling it revenge for their losses in the offensive.

On 22 May, new clashes occurred on the western outskirts of Jaar while fighting had subsided around Zinjibar.

On 23 May, seven soldiers and 22 militants were killed during clashes in the militant-controlled town of Bajidar which lasted until morning. The military launched heavy artillery and airstrikes on Zinjibar and Jaar. The Yemeni Army advanced into and secured several parts of the central and northern neighbourhoods of Zinjibar, including the stadium and government buildings. At least seven militants were killed and one soldier wounded in the city. 26 militants and nine soldiers were killed in Jaar, while two militants were killed as the air force bombed Ansar al-Sharia checkpoints in Shuqrah.

On 24 May, overnight fighting in the Jaar area left 35 militant fighters dead after Ansar al-Sharia conducted an attack on army forces in Wadi Bana, west of the city. Security forces took control of the Wadi Bana after the attack. A military official stated that though the army was making progress in its advance on Jaar, "it was facing resistance" from the militants. Sporadic clashes continued in Zinjibar, where the militants snipers were targeting security forces who had taken control of several buildings on the outskirts of the city. Ansar al-Sharia launched a counterattack against government forces from the eastern parts of the city but were pushed back, with only one soldier suffering injuries. Two soldiers were killed and six were wounded in the city altogether.

On 26 May, at least 62 militants were killed in Zinjibar as army forces moved deeper within the city and regained key positions. The 25th Mechanised Brigade "managed early on Saturday to deal heavy blows to terrorists in Maraqid and Mashqasa … killing 20 terrorist elements, most of them Somalis" according to its commander Brig. Gen. Mohammed al-Sawmali. Two soldiers were killed and four were wounded in the battle for the areas located on the northeastern outskirts of Zinjibar. After capturing them, the army seized machineguns, rockets, and rocket propelled grenades. The bodies of 25 soldiers who had died in earlier clashes were found in the city. A roadside bomb near Jaar killed eight soldiers in a military vehicle. The military captured several hills located two kilometers from Jaar and seized large quantities of weapons abandoned by retreating militants. A Yemeni aircraft bombed a factory west of the town being used by militants as a base, killing seven. According to CNN, President Hadi ordered forces positioned on the outskirts of Jaar and Zinjibar to start an all-out offensive on the cities.

On 27 May, around 15 militants were killed in overnight clashes north of Jaar. Reports stated that the 25th Mechanised Brigade, 39th Armored Brigade and local Popular Committee's had recaptured all militant-held positions in the east of Zinjibar, including Maraqid and Mashqasa. A military source told the Yemen Times that clashes were ongoing in Zinjibar and that the army had gained control of a large portion of Jaar. Ansar al-Sharia reportedly proposed a ceasefire agreement in which it would free captured soldiers and civilians, along with a female Swiss tourist, in exchange for the army halting its artillery shelling of Zinjibar and Jaar, but it was rejected.

=== 28 May to 4 June ===
On 28 May, overnight clashes occurred near Jaar as ground forces backed by the air force slowly advanced towards it. Five militants including a "mid-level commander" for AQAP, Abdul Rahman al-Musallami, were killed along with one civilian. According to a military official, the military advanced to "about three kilometres of Jaar," and have "surrounded the city from the north, the east and the west."

On 29 May, an attack on a military convoy in the village of Mazraat Mashhour, southwest of Zinjibar, left three soldiers and two militants dead. The militants "failed to seize the contents of the convoy" which was headed to Zinjibar from Aden. The military claimed that it had secured most of Zinjibar but was still involved in fierce clashes to completely capture it. The army continued its cautious advance towards Jaar backed by heavy airstrikes and artillery shelling which destroyed nine houses in the city, killing a resident and injuring three. The city itself was almost entirely deserted excluding the militants, who had "set up anti-aircraft guns and dug trenches in the streets and pulled their heavy weapons into the center of the town from the outskirts for fear of airstrikes" according to a local resident. The army advanced at least one kilometer towards Jaar, capturing militant-held positions on its outskirts which put it within two to three kilometers of the town, while killing at least 10 militants.

On 30 May, an early morning counterattack was launched by the militants on army positions in al-Hurur. The militants attempted to encircle the army, however their maneuver was resisted in an intense two-hour battle which left at least 20 militants and seven soldiers dead, and another four soldiers wounded. The 135th Infantry Brigade and 201st Mechanised Brigade successfully repulsed the attack and defused landmines planted by the militants before subsequently increased pressure on the besieged militants in Jaar. Artillery shelling and clashes west of Jaar left 17 tribal fighters and six soldiers dead and 12 injured. Early day airstrikes on a militant communications station near Shuqrah, which was used to "direct operations using the Internet, wireless communications and a satellite telephone" according to military officials, killed three and wounded seven.

On 31 May, fighting was reported on the northern and western outskirts of Jaar where the army, backed by local Popular Committee fighters, assaulted militant positions. Six soldiers and 12 militants were killed in the clashes, while a further seven militants were killed by artillery shelling in the town.

On 1 June, Ansar al-Sharia announced that it had released 27 soldiers captured the previous month in Abyan after they had pledged to quit the army. Three militants were killed and five were wounded when a bomb they were making exploded in al-Mahfad. A reported US drone fired three missiles at a house in eastern al-Mahfad, destroying it and communications equipment inside of it, along with killing at least 11 militants including three Somalis and other foreigners. The house was reportedly a compound used for communications and meetings between AQAP members. Clashes broke out in the evening as army forces headed from Lawdar district to the al-Arqoub and Shuqrah areas to cut off Ansar al-Sharia supply lines. 10 militants were killed and 14 were arrested during the clashes.

On 2 June, the military stated that one soldier had been killed and six were injured as militants fired three rockets at the base of the 25th Mechanised Brigade during clashes outside of Zinjibar. Four militants were killed during the clashes. An official from the brigade stated that two militants were killed in the southern district of the city late in the day, while a soldier was killed in the same area by a militant sniper. He claimed that the military was in control of the northern, eastern and southern outskirts of the city, but was still engaged in securing the central area of it and its remaining northwestern entrances to cut it off from Jaar to the north and Shuqrah to the east. Four militants were killed by artillery south of a.

On 3 June, Ansar al-Sharia forces launched an attack on army positions in central Zinjibar, near a branch of the Central Bank and other government institutions, in an attempt to regain control of the area. Clashes in the central streets lasted from 5:00 to 7:0 when the army eventually repelled the militants, killing six while losing two soldiers. 13 militants were killed in clashes outside of Jaar, while two militants were killed by artillery shelling on their car in al-Kawd. The army and Popular Committee forces advanced from Lawdar towards Shuqrah in order to "tighten the noose around al-Qaeda militants from all sides" according to the military. President Hadi reportedly ordered Republican Guard commander Ahmed Saleh to take a central role in recapturing Zinjibar, with additional Republican Guard units being deployed to the city.

On 4 June, reports detailed that the Yemeni Army was preparing for a push to retake Shuqrah, with hundreds of soldiers along with army tanks advancing towards the town. In Lawdar, two militants in a car bomb, of whom one was reportedly dressed as a woman, attacked an army checkp oint at Um Sorra, killing four Popular Committee personnel and injuring five. The attack targeted Col. Mohammed Batreeh, head of military intelligence in Abyan, though he survived the incident. According to a colonel in Zinjibar, about 50 Somalis had arrived at Jaar via boat in order to support Ansar al-Sharia.

=== 5 June to 11 June ===
On 5 June, intense overnight clashes in Zinjibar which began the previous day left at least 23 militants and one soldier dead, and another injured. 15 of the militants were killed at the Shaddad Fort, while others were killed near the Hassan Stadium and al-Kawd as they attempted to infiltrate military positions in the southwestern and northern edges of the city. The military reported 10 militant casualties during clashes in Jaar.

On 6 June, clashes in Zinjibar which began the previous night into the morning left 17 militants and six soldiers dead. They were described as one of the fiercest rounds fighting in the city since the offensive began.

On 7 June, an airstrike on the eastern outskirts of Jaar destroyed a pick-up truck loaded with heavy weapons as it driving on a road to Zinjibar. The strike left 5 militants dead and three wounded. Ansar al-Sharia militants attempted to retake control of the village of Batis, north of Jaar, after it was secured by government forces a week earlier. Popular Committee fighters along with soldiers backed by artillery fought off the attack and killed at least 20 militants. An ambush near Batis led by former militant and Popular Committee leader Abdullatif al-Sayed killed five militants. A Yemeni plane bombed a militant checkpoint in Mudiyah, killing two militant commanders while they were inspecting it and injuring seven others. In Lawdar, local tribesmen foiled two separate attempts by suicide bombers to infiltrate the town.

On 8 June, militants opened fire on an army post on the western outskirts of Jaar, killing two soldiers and wounding four. In response, the army shelled the city of Jaar with artillery, killing at least nine militants and wounding five.

On 9 June, intense overnight clashes in areas east of Jaar lasted until morning, killing 10 militants and three soldiers. Yemeni warplanes struck militant-held areas inside and near the city.

On 11 June, the military began its most serious effort to capture Jaar to date, moving in on the city from three different directions. Overnight clashes translated into the day as the army captured several small towns in the surrounding areas of the city. Yemeni airstrikes and artillery targeted the center of the town, while bombing runs were reported north and west of it. After hours of fighting, government forces successfully captured a hilltop munitions factory overlooking the town used as a base by the militants, about five kilometers away from the center of the city. Within the factory were the bodies of 12 suspected militants. 26 militants and two soldiers were reported to have been killed in Jaar, while 13 soldiers were injured. A military official stated that the army was positioned on the outskirts of the city and was ready to enter it, but were not going to do so during the day as they "feared the militants might have booby-trapped most of the surrounding roads." In Shuqrah, clashes lead to the deaths eight militants and the injury of four soldiers. Government forces also seized Ahwar, a town nearby to Shuqrah.

=== 12 June to 23 June ===
On 12 June, the Yemeni government and military announced that it had successfully recaptured Zinjibar and Jaar. Soldiers entered Jaar early in the morning after heavy fighting left at least 20 militants, four soldiers and two civilians dead, and another 20 soldiers wounded. A local resident confirmed that military vehicles had entered the city from the north. Ansar al-Sharia fled the city under the cover of darkness before the army arrived, with residents confirming that the city was deserted by militants by the time of dawn prayers. During their withdrawal, the militants left flyers in the city apologizing any harm endured by the residents of Jaar. Hours after the initial entrance, officials confirmed that Jaar was completely secured as armored vehicles moved into the center of the city. The Aden-Jaar road, which links Aden to northern Abyan. was also reopened by the army. Ansar al-Sharia claimed through its Madad News Agency that it had withdrew from the city in order to protect its residents from artillery shelling, though the spokesperson from the Yemeni embassy in the US called it "an attempt to save face." In Zinjibar, 10 militants were killed in clashes with the army before they withdrew from the city. WIthin the city, the bodies of six militants were found dead, while five soldiers were wounded by landmines planted by retreating militants. Hours after the capture of Jaar, the military confirmed that all of Zinjibar was secured, including the local government headquarters. 200 to 300 militants were reported to have fled both cities towards Shuqrah. A Yemeni official stated that militants in Shuqrah had "put themselves in a small circle because all roads and supply lines to them were cut off", claiming that they were cornered in two locations. Airstrikes struck two vehicles used by militants travelling from Zinjibar to Shuqrah, while the Yemeni Navy sunk 10 boats which the militants would have used to flee Shuqrah if needed. The Yemeni Army was also closing in on Azzan in Shabwah Governorate, where many militants also fled.

On 13 June, Defence Minister Mohammed Nasser Ahmed claimed that the army was "within hours" of capturing Shuqrah as clashes raged in and around the city during the day. The army backed by warplanes and Popular Committees clashed with militants north of the city, successfully capturing a hilltop overlooking it and several other mountain positions. Eight militants and three tribal fighters were killed in the clashes. A military official stated that the army had surrounded the town from three directions. Northeast of Shuqrah, three airstrikes in and around Azzan targeted "militants who fled Abyan", killing at least 30 militants and wounding dozens. The airstrikes targeted a home suspected of harboring militants and two militant vehicles. Though it was unclear if the airstrikes were launched by the US or Yemen, a local official stated that at least one of the airstrikes was conducted by a US drone. Seven people were killed, including two civilians, in Zinjibar at night by landmines. On 14 June, numerous militants were reported to have fled Shuqrah towards Azzan after setting fire to two tanks and other military equipment. Gains made by government forces the previous day put it only a few kilometers away from Shuqrah.

On 15 June, government forces took control over Shuqrah, with an official stating that "troops have taken positions in the centre" of the city. At least 48 people, including 40 militants, were killed in the battle for the city. Most of the militants in Shuqrah fled to a mountainous region to the west of the city or went to Azzan. Yemeni warplanes bombed a convoy of militant vehicles fleeing Shuqrah, killing about 30 of them. Fighting near Azzan left 53 militants dead, while 23 militants were killed in overnight clashes near gas facilities in Balhaf. The capture of Shuqrah represented fall of the third and last Ansar al-Sharia stronghold in Abyan Governorate, though militants were reportedly still in control of a number of small settlements, including the town of al-Mahfad. Military officials said that the army was gathering outside of Azzan, the last major town controlled by the militants in the south. The Yemeni Air Force launched bombing runs on militant hideouts in the mountains surrounding the city. Three people were killed by landmines in Zinjibar.

On 16 June, clashes the previous day continued into the morning in Azzan, leaving at least 17 militants dead and six soldiers wounded. Local tribal chiefs requested to the militants that they leave the town in order to the residents from army artillery shelling. Witnesses reported seeing several trucks carrying Ansar al-Sharia fighters and their weapons leaving Azzan for the nearby mountains. Clashes were reported in the Hassan Valley, east of Zinjibar, killing four militants and one soldier. On 17 June, Ansar al-Sharia peacefully withdrew from Azzan late in the day following mediation by local tribal leaders. The militants also withdrew from the nearby town of al-Huta. Control of Azzan was transferred to a tribal committee formed two days prior to prevent a military offensive. However, the following day, the general leading the offensive the militants, Salem Ali Qatan, was killed in Aden by a suicide bomber. Two other soldiers were killed in the attack and twelve people sustained injuries. On 23 June, tribesmen in Azzan transferred control of the town arriving army personnel.

== Aftermath ==
In the weeks after the recapture of the main population centers there were no reported incidents. The first major attack was on 1 August, when a group of around 20 militants attacked a police station in the former insurgent stronghold of Jaʿār, killing four officers and injuring another. Three days later, a suicide bomber killed at least 45 people and injured more than 40 others during a funeral service in Jaar. Military officials and residents said the bomber targeted tribesmen who sided with the Yemeni army during an offensive against Islamist fighters that the government hailed as a major victory in June. Abyan remained quiet for the following weeks, despite major attacks by AQAP against the central intelligence building in Aden on 18 August, as well as the convoy of Yemeni Defense Minister Gen. Mohammed Nasser Ahmed in the heart of the capital Sana'a. The latter blast came one day after the government announced the death of AQAP number-two operative Said al-Shihri in a US drone strike. On 16 October a suicide bomber killed six local militia members at a checkpoint outside the city of Mudya in Abyan. On 19 October militants set off a car bomb at an army base in Abyan Governorate, sparking a heavy firefight with security forces. Sixteen soldiers and 8 militants were killed during the raid, while at least 29 soldiers were injured. A suicide bombing at a militia office in Zinjibar killed at least three on 16 November.

In the beginning of December Amnesty International released a report on the fighting, accusing both sides in the conflict of "horrific" rights abuses and calling for an impartial government probe into events on the ground. According to the report, Islamic militants had set up their own courts and carried out "public summary killings, crucifixion, amputation and flogging". Ansar al-Sharia also "used residential areas as a base of operations, particularly in Jaar, thus exposing civilians to harm. The London-based watchdog also accused Yemeni government troops of using air strikes, artillery and mortars to indiscriminately bombard civilian areas, resulting in scores of casualties, including many children.

On 31 January 2013, clashes broke out between Yemeni Army units and suspected militants in al-Maraksha, Abyan Governorate. By 2 February the government forces had successfully pushed the insurgents out of the town, killing 12 of them. At least 5 Yemeni soldiers and local militia members were also killed during the fighting. According to local sources, the militants moved to East Anwar, about 80 km from the regional capital Zinjibar.

=== 2015–2016 fall and recapture ===
Al-Qaeda's fighters stormed Jaar and Zinjibar in early December 2015 and recaptured the towns, later declaring them "Emirates", providing civilian services, and establishing a Sharia court. In summer 2016 Yemeni government forces backed by Arab coalition aircraft and gunboats moved to retake the towns, and despite encountering "repeated suicide attacks" drove AQAP out of Zinjibar on 14 August 2016.
