= Abyan campaign =

Campaign of the Yemeni Civil War

- Part of the South Yemen insurgency and Saudi Arabian-led intervention in Yemen
- Location of the Abyan Governorate within Yemen
| Date | 26 March – 11 August 2015 (4 months, 2 weeks and 2 days) |
| Location | Abyan Governorate, Yemen |
| Result | Coalition victory: Pro-Hadi forces fully recaptured the entire Abyan Governorate |

Belligerents
| (Yemen) Supreme Political Council: Houthi fighters; Yemeni Republican Guard | Cabinet of Yemen: Republic of Yemen Armed Forces; People's Committees; Popular resistance; Arab coalition: Saudi Arabia (leader); Bahrain; Egypt; Jordan; Kuwait; Morocco; Sudan; United Arab Emirates | AQAP |

Commanders and leaders
| Abdul Nasser al-Junaidi | (Saudi Arabia) Ali Mohsen Al Ahmar † | Abu Hamza al-Zinjibari; Abu al Zinad al Abyani |

Units involved
| 15th Armored Brigade Houthi fighters | 111th Infantry Brigade | AQAP fighters |

Strength
| 200 soldiers 100 Houthi fighters | 600 soldiers (Yemen) 400 popular committee fighters | 600 fighters |

Casualties and losses
| 49 killed | 31 killed | unknown |

The Abyan campaign was a 2015 campaign for control of Abyan Governorate, Yemen, between loyalists to then-former president Ali Abdullah Saleh (the Houthis and factions of the Yemeni Armed Forces), loyalists to then-current president Abdrabbuh Mansour Hadi (the Arab coalition, and other factions of the Armed Forces), and jihadists of al-Qaeda in the Arabian Peninsula (AQAP).

The pro-Hadi forces recaptured Abyan Governorate on 11 August 2015, after launching an offensive on pro-Houthi forces in early August.

== Campaign ==
On 26 March 2015, the 15th Armored Brigade, based in Lawdar, announced their support for the Houthis. In turn, the 111th Infantry Brigade, based in the Ahwar District, joined forces with pro-Hadi troops five days later. In addition, al-Qaeda in the Arabian Peninsula (AQAP) pledged to fight alongside pro-Hadi forces against the Houthis but clarified they were not loyal to Hadi.

On 27 March, Houthi and allied army forces seized the city of Shuqrah on the Arabian Sea. The takeover gave them control of all land entries to Aden and completed their encirclement of the city where a battle was underway. However, warplanes from the Saudi-led coalition began to bedevil the Houthis as they moved their heavy armour and vehicles toward Aden, with airstrikes halting a convoy from Shuqrah early on 28 March.

On 29 March, pro-Houthi troops captured Zinjibar, the provincial capital and a center for pro-Hadi forces in the governorate. 20 people were killed during the takeover. Heavy clashes took place between tribal fighters and Houthi-allied soldiers occupying a military camp and adjacent football field in the city, which was bombed twice by the Coalition.

On 3 April, Houthi forces entered the districts of Jaar, Lawdar and Shuqrah. Pro-Hadi military sources claimed that the 111th Infantry Brigade had cut off supplies to the Houthis and their allies on 7 April, but a source in the pro-Houthi 15th Armored Brigade said they had supplies still coming from the Al Bayda Governorate to the north. Sustained fighting took place during the day in Lawdar, while pro-Hadi forces reportedly besieged the base of the pro-Houthi army brigade.

On 25 April, at least 29 pro-Houthi fighters were killed in attacks throughout the province, according to an official.

On 8 August, Pro-Hadi forces launched an offensive to retake the city of Zinjibar from Houthi militias after the pro-government forces retook Jaʿār and Lawdar.

On 10 August, Pro-Hadi forces had retaken the provincial capital Zinjibar after just two days of fighting Houthi militias in the city, they will continue the offensive to retake the city of Shuqrah. On 11 August, Pro-Hadi forces had recaptured the entire Abyan Governorate.
