= Al Jawl =

- Location in Yemen
- Coordinates: 13°09′41″N 45°20′19″E
- Country: Yemen
- Governorate: Abyan
- Time zone: UTC+3 (Yemen Standard Time)

Al Jawl is a village in south-western Yemen. It is located in the Abyan Governorate.

== Overview ==
The livelihoods of the local people depend on agriculture. The land, which is coastal plain, is supplied by water from the nearby Wadi Bana, which flows to the west of the village into the sea. Al Jawl lies several kilometres form the coast, north of the coastal town of Al Kawd.
