= Aden Protectorate Levies =

Military force for local defence of the Aden Protectorate under British rule

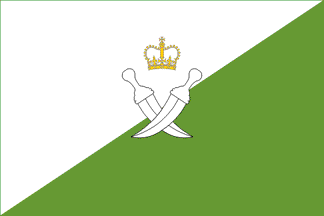
- Aden Protectorate Levies Flag
- Active: 1928–1967
- Country: Yemen
- Allegiance: Aden Protectorate; Federation of South Arabia
- Type: Light Infantry and Support elements
- Role: Scouting; Border guard
- Size: 6,000 (1965)
- Part of: GHQ Yemen; 6 Infantry Battalions; 1 Medium Artillery Battery; 1 Light Armoured Cavalry Car Squadron; 2 Logistics and Transport Companies; 2 Signal Companies; 1 Sapper Company; 1 Anti-Aircraft Company
- Regimental Centre: Khormaksar
- Uniform: Khaki/Drab; faced green
- Engagements: World War II; North Yemen Civil War (border clashes); Aden Emergency

The Aden Protectorate Levies (APL) was a military force recruited from indigenous tribal populations, for the local defence of the Aden Protectorate under British rule. The Levies were drawn from all parts of the Protectorate and were armed, trained and officered by the Indian Army, Royal Air Force and British Army at various stages in the history of the force. They used the Lahej emblem of crossed jambiyah (traditional curved double-edged dagger) as their badge.

== History ==
=== Foundation ===
The APL were formed on 1 April 1928, primarily to protect Royal Air Force stations following the change of status of Aden to an Air Command in April 1927. Their secondary role was to be that of assisting the civil police, especially in the Western Aden Protectorate where there had been disturbances since the previous year. The APL also organized a camel troop with 48 camels.

Prior to 1928 the British garrison in Aden had comprised one British and one Indian infantry battalion, plus Royal Artillery units and detachments of sappers and miners. A locally recruited infantry unit, known as the 1st Yemen Infantry, had been raised in the Aden Protectorate during 1917-18 for service in World War I but had been disbanded in 1925.

=== Organisation ===
Colonel M.C. Lake of the British Indian Army was the first Commanding Officer of the APL. Lt. Col. J.C. (Robby) Robinson took over command in 1929 and remained as C.O. till 1939. In 1928 the APL comprised two British officers and six platoons of Arabs recruited from the various tribes that lived in the foothills or the higher mountainous regions of the protectorate. Each platoon comprised one officer and 34 non-commissioned officers and men, as well as 48 camels and 8 mules to carry them, their supplies, and equipment. During the early years of the APL's existence a number of junior commissioned officers and senior NCOs were Indian.

The APL Depot Battalion, the Levies' base and training organisation, was based in Aden Colony. The Depot included married quarters, a neonatal clinic, a school for children, the APL Band, and the APL Camel Troop. Air supply and other repair and supply units also were based there.

The APL Hospital (ALH), located near Khormaksar, was a 160-bed RAF general hospital that provided free medical care to the APL's 1,500 men active members and their families, and also to former members, about 10,000 people in all. The ALH also provided the medicines to the APL. The hospital CO was an RAF doctor; two RAF warrant officers and an administration and supplies staff assisted him. Three RAF doctors and a surgeon, assisted by local doctors, provided medical coverage. The other RAF personnel were two male nurses, two laboratory technicians and a pharmacist. Local people made up the rest of the staff and all of them would have been trained on site.

=== Arab officers ===
Arab officers were called Bimbashis, with one in each battalion being responsible to the Commanding Officer for Arab Administration. They held Governor's Commissions as 2nd lieutenant (MulazimIth Thani); lieutenant (Mulazim Al Awal); captain (Rais); and major (Wakil Qaid Ith Thani). During the period of RAF control prior to 1957, a different system of Arab rank designations had been in place at all levels. The senior Arab rank was that of lieutenant colonel (Qaid Al Awal).

=== World War II ===
During the Second World War the APL was expanded from 600 to 1,600 men. The Levies operated in Aden and the Western Aden Protectorate but also provided garrisons at Socotra Island and Sharjah. By 1939 an APL anti-aircraft wing had been created, which shot down an Italian plane in the course of the war.

In 1942 a six-year process of replacing British Army personnel serving with the APL with RAF Regiment officers and airmen commenced. This policy led to the reorganisation of the Levies into a tactical force of two wings, each about the equivalent of a battalion, plus an administrative wing. A third infantry wing was added after 1948.

=== Postwar ===
During the December 1947 anti-Jewish riots in Aden City, some Arab personnel of the Levies proved ineffective in controlling inter-communal violence and fired indiscriminately into Jewish houses, killing several of the inhabitants.

The Levies reverted to War Office control in 1957 with British Army officers and NCOs replacing RAF secondees. The AFL headquarters was at Seedaseer Lines in Khormaksar. "Up country" forward bases and garrisons were maintained at Dhala, Mukalla, Seiyun, Beihan, Zinjibar, Ataq. Lawdar and Mukeiras.

In 1958 the APL, supported by British troops and the RAF, repulsed border intrusions by Yemeni forces in the Jebel Jihaf region. Border clashes with North Yemeni tribal groups continued through the late 1950s.

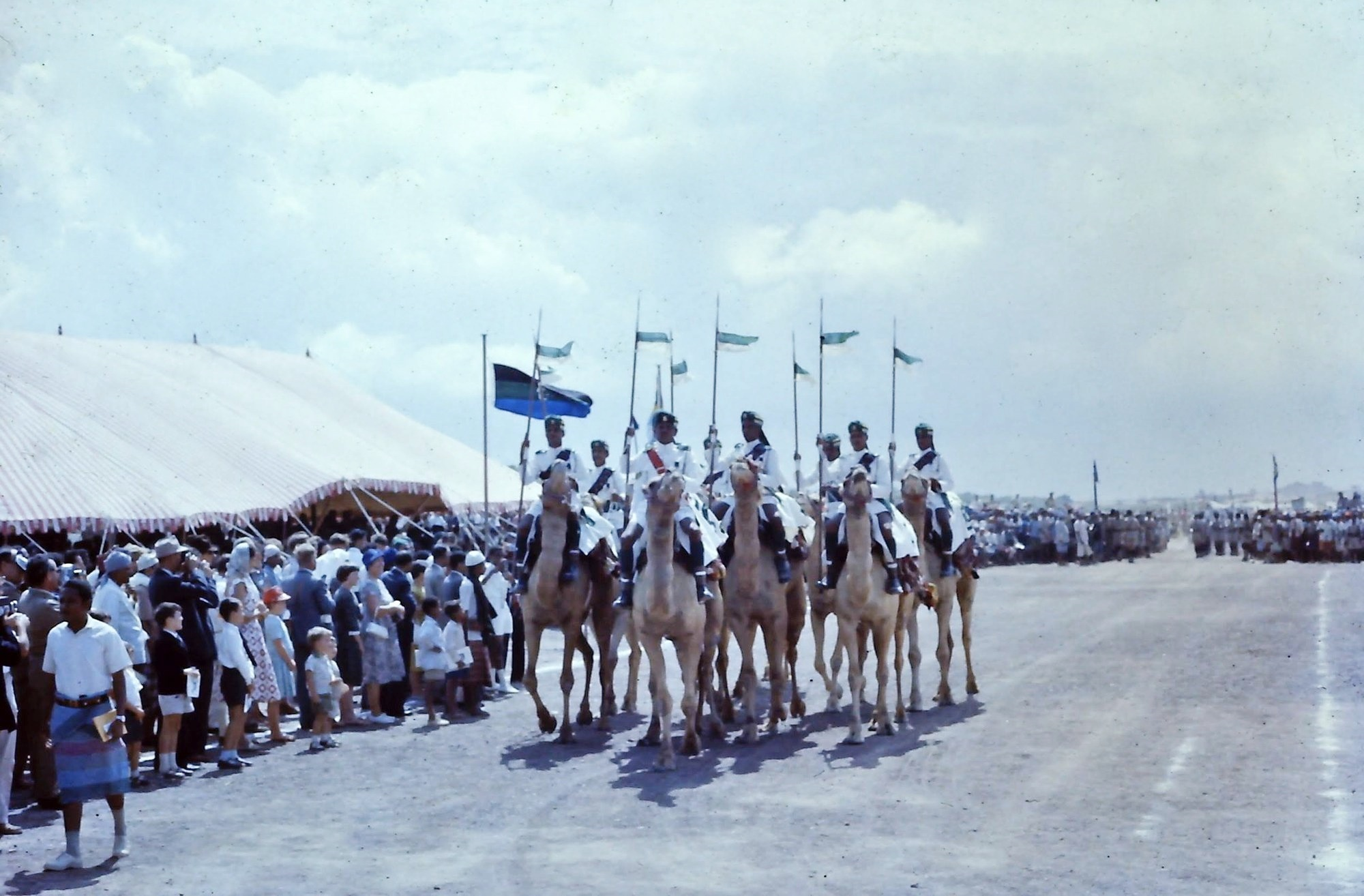
A detachment of Aden Protectorate Levies parading near Zinjibar, capital of the Fadhli Sultanate in 1962/1963. The event was part of celebrations linked to the creation of the new Federation of South Arabia. The flag is that of the Fadhli Sultanate.

By 1961 the APL consisted of four rifle battalions, each of which had a weapons company equipped with 82mm Mortars and Medium Machine Guns and a Signal Platoon, and a Mechanical Transport Company. A Medium Artillery Battery equipped with eight Ordnance QF 25-pounder Field Guns stationed at Dhale and Mukeiras, and a fifth rifle battalion were raised in 1964, after the Levies had become the Federal Regular Army. The APL was a brigade-equivalent force with its own air supply and air liaison officers and a Senior Arab Officer. Additional units included the APL Armoured Car Squadron raised in 1962 at Beihan with fourteen Daimler Armoured Cars, the APL Signal Squadron, the APL Band and the APL Camel Troop. The APL Camel Troop was a ceremonial unit.

On 30 November 1961, following the creation of the South Arabian Federation, the APL changed its name to the Federal Regular Army. After 1967, most of the troops and many native officers of the Levies joined the newly formed South Yemeni Army, or People's Democratic Republic of Yemen Armed Forces. The new Army consisted of a merging of the existing units of the APL with the 7,000 troops and units of the Marxist National Liberation Front guerilla organisation that had spearheaded the anti-British insurgency movement. British-trained personnel were considered politically unreliable and were purged from the reorganised armed forces of the newly established People's Republic of Yemen.

== Awards ==
Officers and other ranks of the Levies were awarded the following:

- One Distinguished Service Order (D.S.O.)
- Seven Military Crosses (M.C.)
- Two Military Medals (M.M.)
- One Officer of the Order of the British Empire (O.B.E.)
- Three Member of the Order of the British Empires (M.B.E)
- One British Empire Medal (B.E.M.)

== Insignia and uniforms ==
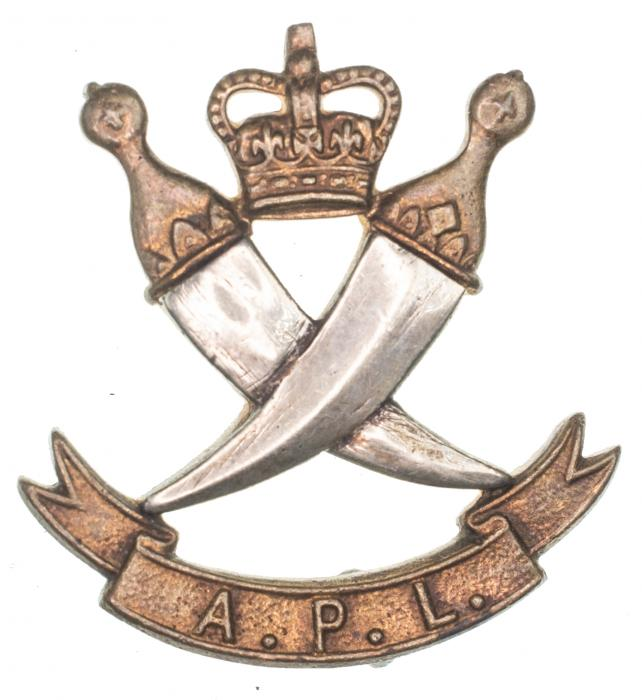

The badge of the APL, worn in various designs from the 1940s on, included crossed jambiyas (double-edged Adeni daggers) under a crescent and star, with the motto "Peace be with you" in Arabic.

Throughout its history the APL wore the khaki drill uniform of the British Indian Army, complete with a Punjabi style pagri (turban). When on service in the "up-country" hinterland of the Protectorate, a simple khaki head-roll or mashedda was adopted by all ranks, modeled on that of the Audhali tribe from whom many of the Levies were recruited. A white ceremonial uniform with green turban and waist-sash was worn by both the Camel Troop and the Guard of Honour.

== See also ==
- Iraq Levies, a similar unit in Iraq
