= Khanfar =

Khanfar may refer to:

- Khanfar, Abyan, Yemen
- Khanfar, Hadhramaut, Yemen
- Wadah Khanfar, director of Al Jazeera
