= Jaar munitions factory explosion =

2011 blast at a factory in Southern Yemen

Jaʽār factory explosion
- Location: 13°13′23″N 45°18′20″E; Ammunition factory, near Jaʿār, Abyan Governorate
- Date: March 28, 2011 (UTC+3)
- Attack type: militant raid, followed by accidental explosion caused by nearby resident
- Deaths: 150
- Injuries: 45

A munitions factory explosion took place on March 28, 2011, in the village of Khanfar, Abyan, bordering the town of Jaʽār in Abyan Governorate, southern Yemen.

== Background ==
The explosion occurred during a period of high insurgency from rebel forces and Islamist movements in Southern Yemen, in addition to an ongoing government crackdown on al-Qaeda. Following clashes near the town of Jaʽār, the Yemeni Air Force bombed the area earlier in the day of the explosion. During the same day, President of Yemen Ali Abdullah Saleh announced an end to government concessions given amidst ongoing protests in the country, although it was not immediately known whether the explosion was connected to the protests.

== Incident ==
Approximate location of explosion, Jaʽār, Yemen

The blast occurred a day after around 30 armed al-Qaeda militants raided the "7th of October" ammunition plant in the town, stealing cases of ammunition and leaving gunpowder exposed at the site; militants took over another nearby munitions factory in Khanfar. According to Al Jazeera, the initial fire was reportedly triggered by a local resident dropping a lit cigarette while inside the looted factory, as some were checking the site for weapons, which soon led to an explosion. It was loud enough to be heard roughly 15 km (9.3 mi) from the factory, and left many charred bodies at the scene.

=== Casualties ===
Estimates of the number of casualties were not immediately clear. According to the BBC and AFP, 78 people died in the explosion, while The Independent said that "more than 100" people died, and CNN said that "[a]t least 121" were killed. By the day after the incident, the death toll had been increased to 150. An accurate death toll was reportedly difficult to establish, due to the condition of the bodies, many of which were badly burned. 45 people were reported injured, 27 of whom were, according to officials at a local hospital, in critical condition after the incident. Some of the injured were taken to Jaʿār for treatment, while others received treatment at a hospital in Aden.

== Reaction ==
Abyan's Deputy Governor Saleh al-Samty placed blame on the national government for creating a lack of order in southern Yemen caused by heightened security countrywide. The Joint Meeting Parties opposition group (JMP) blamed the incident on government military withdrawal in the south.
