= Amdibyana (Jayshan) =

Village in Yemen

Amdibyana (Arabic: امضبيانة) is a small village located in Jayshan District, Abyan Governorate, Yemen. According to the 2004 Yemen Census, the population of the village was 80.

As of 2014, the population of the village reached 107.
