= Abu Bakr Hussein Salem =

Yemeni governor

- أبو بكر حسين سالم
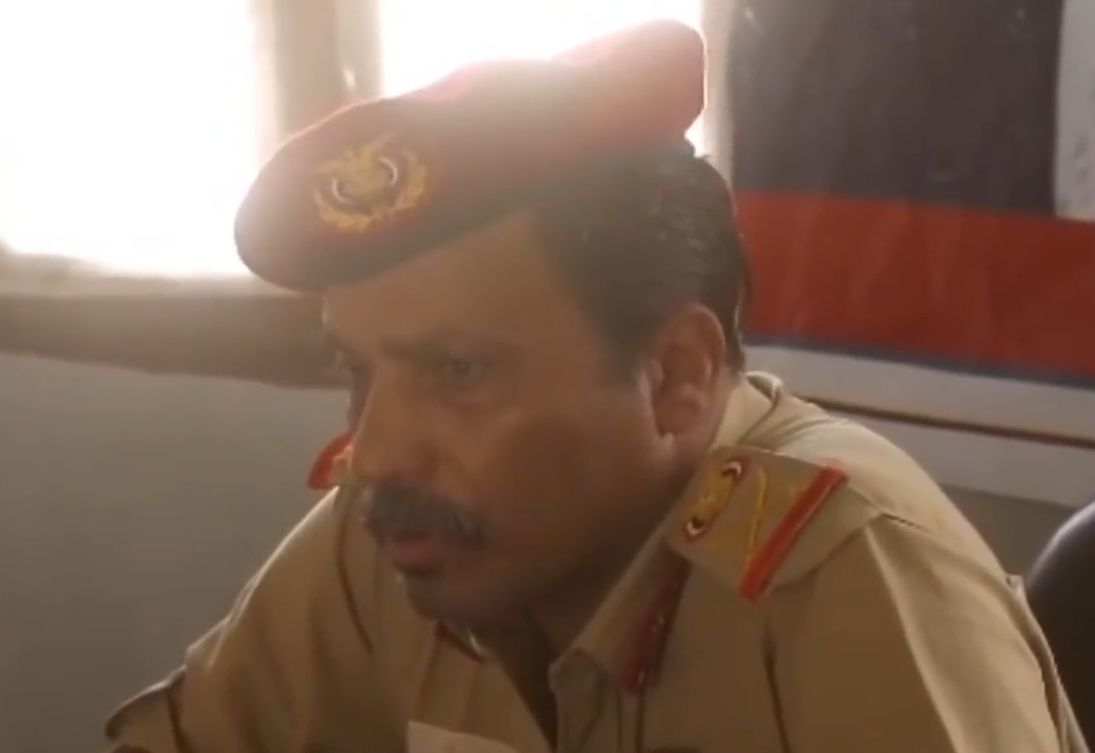
- Salem in 2020

Governor of Abyan Governorate
- Incumbent
- Assumed office 12 March 2017
- President: Abdrabbuh Mansour Hadi; Rashad al-Alimi
- Preceded by: Al-Khader al-Saidi

Personal details
- Born: 1960s Yaramis, Abyan Governorate, Yemen
- Party: Islah

Military service
- Allegiance: Yemen
- Branch/service: Yemeni Land Forces
- Rank: Major general
- Battles/wars: Yemeni civil war (2014–present); Abyan campaign

Abu Bakr Hussein Salem is a Yemeni military officer who has served as the governor of Abyan since 2017. Aligned with the internationally recognized government of Yemen, Salem played a role in defending Abyan during the 2015 Houthi offensive amidst the Yemeni civil war. Salem is affiliated with the Islah party, and is an ally of the central government.

== Biography ==
Salem was born in the 1960s in the Yaramis area of Khanfar district, Abyan. He rose through the ranks of the Yemeni Armed Forces from a private during the 1990s to a brigadier general by the end of 2014. He earned a master's degree in the national Naval College and Military College, and later travelled abroad to study several military training courses in Russia.

He was the commander of the Coastal Defense Brigade stationed in al-Hudaydah Governorate from 2009 to 2015. His tenure was marked with recognition for the brigade's combat excellence, ranking first place in the annual evaluation of the armed forces units for the combat, operational and moral preparation training year in 2013.

From the start of the Yemeni civil war, Salem sided with the internationally recognized government led by President Abdrabbuh Mansour Hadi. Salem was ordered by the government to return to Abyan during the Houthi offensive in March 2015. There, he helped organize the local Popular Committees, groups of anti-Houthi tribal fighters, and was appointed the head of the Military Coordination Council of the Resistance in Abyan. In May 2016, he was appointed to lead the Abyan military axis and the 15th Infantry Brigade after the assassination of its previous commander earlier in the year.

On 12 March 2017, Salem was appointed as the governor of Abyan amid protests calling for the replacement of the previous governor. He retained his position as the Abyan axis commander, becoming the first provincial governor in Yemen to do so. The decision to appoint Salem, a military officer, was likely made in context of the security crisis which the governorate was facing at the time due to the presence of al-Qaeda in the Arabian Peninsula (AQAP), which had been expelled from most population centers earlier but remained a threat. Security issues were compounded with public services issues for residents which had been ongoing since 2011.

By 2020, the European Council on Foreign Relations noted Salem as being "one of the few Islah-backed IRG figures who has retained a degree of influence there since the STC's partial takeover of the governorate." Salem has praised Operation Arrows of the East, an STC-led counterinsurgency campaign against AQAP, for uniting the different military forces in Abyan and making major gains against the insurgents.
