= Khuban =

Khuban may refer to:

- Khuban, Iran
- Khuban, Yemen
