= Al-Maṣaniʽ =

Al-Maṣāniʽ may refer to:

- Al-Maṣaniʽ, Abyan, Yemen
- Al-Maṣaniʽ, Hadhramaut, Yemen
