= Lawdar district =

Coordinates: 13°53′N 45°52′E

Lawdar District
- District
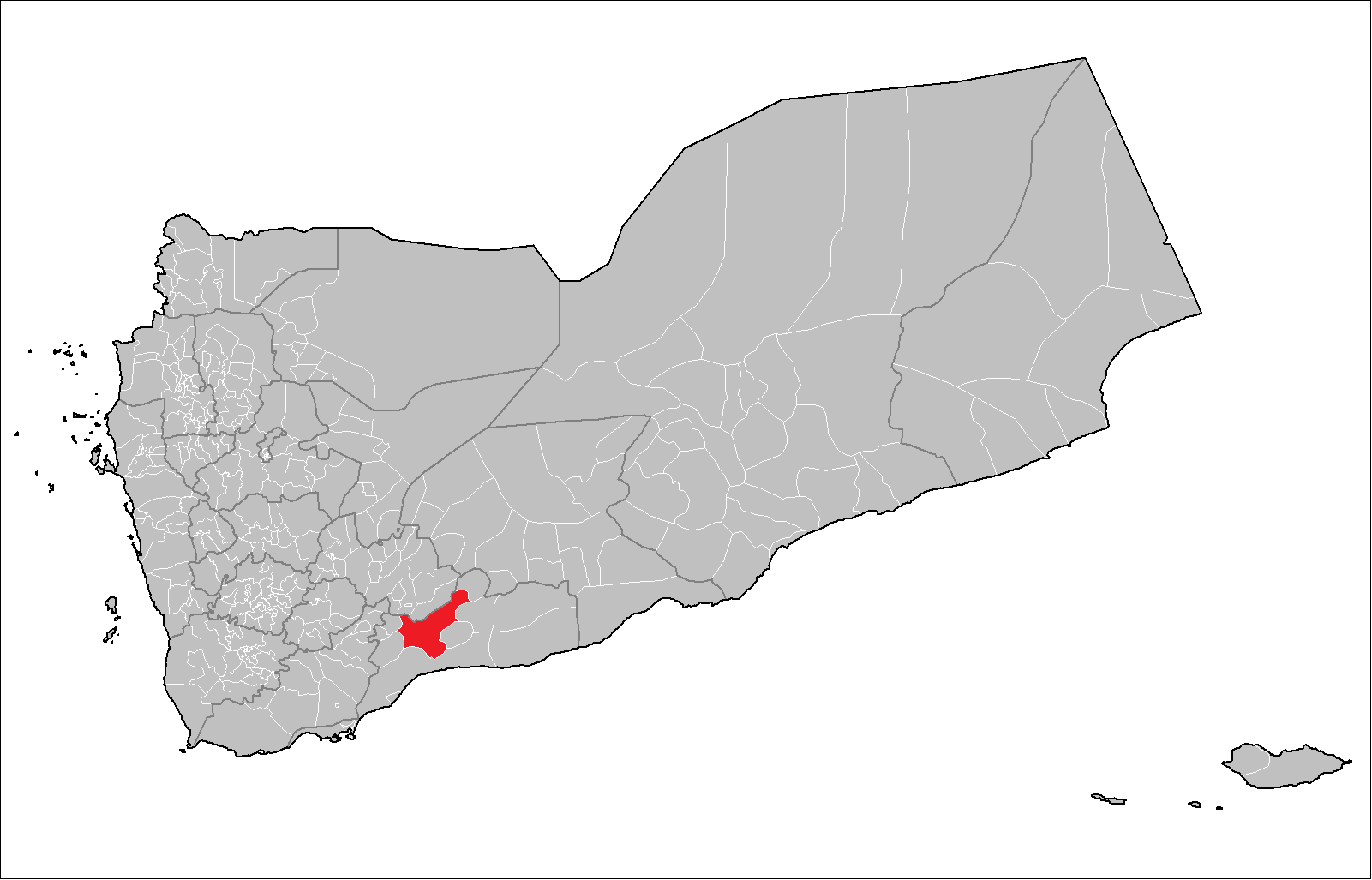
- Country: Yemen
- Governorate: Abyan
- Capital: Lawdar

Population (2003)
  - Total: 88,155
- Time zone: UTC+3 (Yemen Standard Time)

Lawdar District is a district of the Abyan Governorate, Yemen. As of 2003, the district had a population of 88,155 inhabitants.

== Geography ==
Lawdar district is located in the northeastern corner of Abyan Governorate in southern Yemen, internally bordering Mudiyah district and Jayshan district to the east, Sibah district and Khanfar district to the west, al-Wade'a district to the south, and al-Bayda Governorate and the al-Kour mountain range to the north. The district has a total area of 2,166 kilometers^{2}, and has been described as a remote area. It is located approximately 127 km away from Zinjibar, the provincial capital of Abyan.

== History ==
In October 2010, riots took place in Lawdar. A convoy of military officers had to be sent in from Hadramaut to maintain order. Dozens have been killed within Lawdar District in conflicts between the jihadists and the army.
