= Ar rawdah =

Ar rawdah may refer to:

- Ar Rawdah, Sanaa, Yemen
- Ar rawdah, Abyan, Yemen
