= Mansab =

Mansab may refer to:

- Mandab, a rank or position given to a mansabdar in the Mughal empire
- Mansab, Yemen, a village
