= Kawkab =

Kawkab (also spelled Kaukab or Kokab) may refer to:

- Kochab, a star in the constellation Ursa Minor

== Places ==
=== Lebanon ===
- Kaukaba, a village in the Nabatieh Governorate, Southern Lebanon

=== Israel/Palestine ===
- Kaukab Abu al-Hija, a village in the Galilee, northern Israel
- Kawkab al-Hawa - a depopulated Palestinian village in the Jordan Valley, northern Israel
- Kawkaba - a depopulated Palestinian village in the Gaza subdistrict

=== Syria ===
- Kaukab es-Soueid - in Salamiyah District of the Hama Governorate, SSE of Hama on the road to Palmyra
- Kawkab, Hama - village in Hama Governorate, north of Hama
- Kawkab, Rif Dimashq - village in Qatana District of the Rif Dimashq Governorate
- Kawkab military base - a military base in Al-Hasakah Governorate

=== Yemen ===
- Kawkab, Yemen, village in Yemen

== Other ==
- Kawkab al-durriya li-akhbār Ifrīqiya, a 1913 Arabic history of East Africa
- Kawkab Marrakech, an association football club in Morocco
- Kaukab Stewart, British politician
