= Jahrah =

Jahrah may refer to:

- Al Jahra -town in Kuwait
- Jahrah, Yemen - village in Yemen
