= Aaragah =

- Location of mouth

Location
- Country: Yemen

Physical characteristics
- Mouth
  - coordinates: 13°57′58″N 46°07′53″E

Aaragah is a wadi (river) of Yemen. It flows through the Abyan Governorate. It flows through the town of Al Qaws.
