= Bawshar =

Bawshar بوشر
- Province
- Interactive map outlining Bawshar Province
- Location in Oman
- Coordinates: 23°32′N 58°23′E
- Country: Oman
- Governorate: Muscat Governorate

Population (2020)
  - Total: 383,257
- Time zone: UTC+4 (Oman Standard Time)

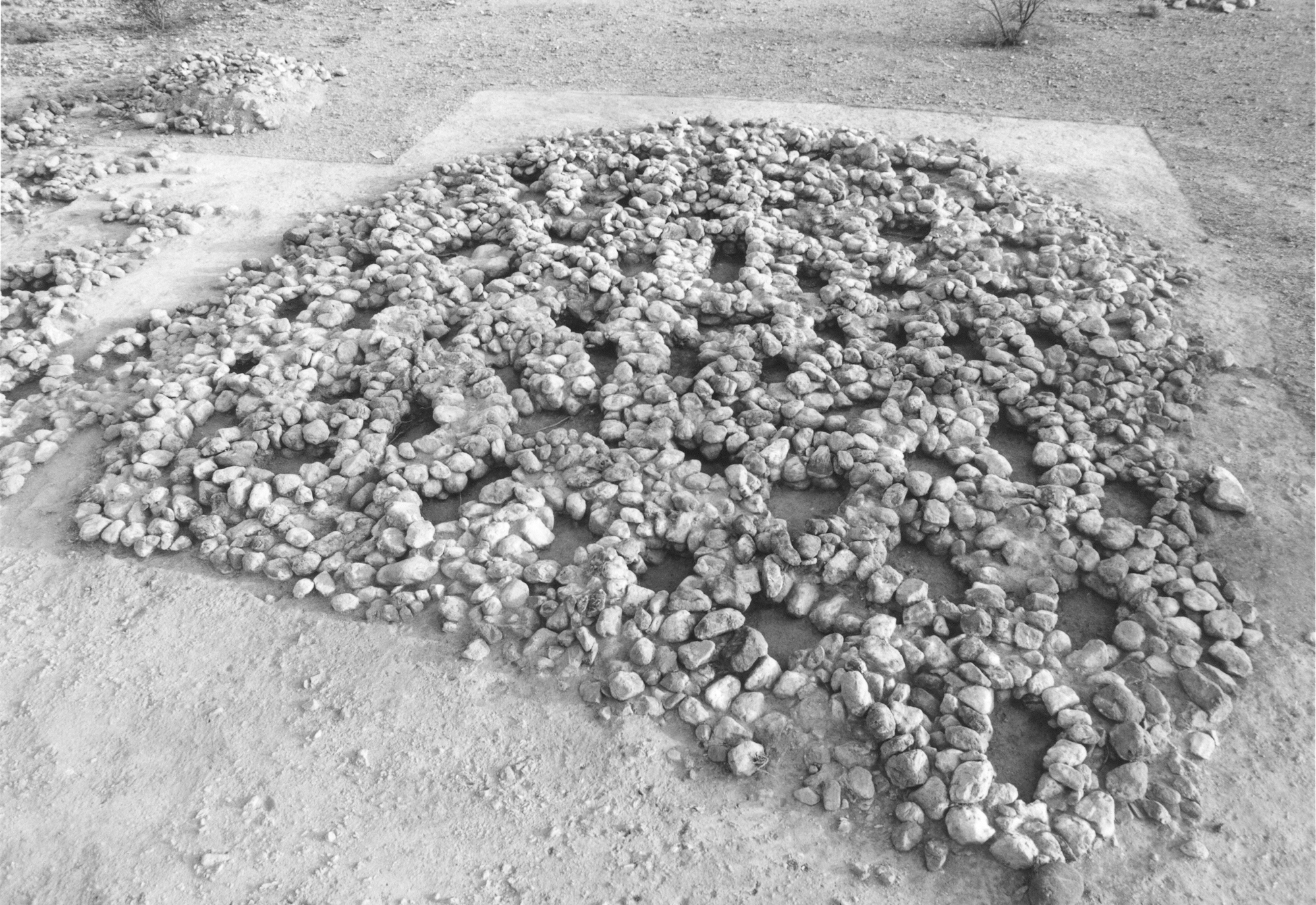
Honeycomb cemetery of the Early Iron Age

Bawshar (Arabic: بوشر Bawšar) is one of the provinces of Muscat, in northeastern Oman. The province borders wilayat Muttrah in the east and wilayat Seeb in the west, it overlooks the Sea of Oman to the north. It contains several archaeological sites and the Qurm Nature Reserve Ramsar site.

According to the 2010 National Census, the population of wilayat Bawshar was 192,235 spread over its 43 villages and towns. The most noteworthy of these are Al Khuwair, Sultan Qaboos City, Al Ghubra, Al Adheeba, Ghala, Al Sarooj, Bowsher Al Qadima, Al Ansab Sanab, Al Hamam, Al Awabi, and Al Misfah. One of the biggest supermarkets of Oman resides here which is Lulu Hypermarket. which is now merged with the Grand Mall Muscat.

Schools in Bawshar include:

- The International School of Oman

In conjunction with the Muscat Grand Mall, there are a number of other shopping malls in the area. These include:

- The Panorama Mall
- Avenues Mall
- The Mall of Oman which has opened in September 2021 and is currently the largest Mall in Oman.

== Landmarks ==
Bawshar has been a central part of Muscat Governate and is home to many crucial landmarks for the country, starting with Sultan Qaboos Stadium which is the national stadium that hosts most international matches for football and other sports, as well as other events that require a high standard stadium.

Another Landmark is Oil and Gas museum, which was opened in 1995, and it displayed the history of Oil and Gas extraction methods and the refinery that comes later through the history and how Oman has developed its methods of extraction and refinery.

The complex also features the Children's Museum, an educational facility focused on science and technology. The museum presents interactive exhibits and simplified scientific principles designed for primary and secondary students. It serves as a frequent site for school field trips intended to foster early interest in science and innovation.

== Bawsher Sands ==
Bawsher Sands is a popular tourist destination, featuring large, colorful sand dunes and dune buggies for rent. The best time to visit the Sands is at sunset, where the views are best.
