= Dor Salamah (Sabah) =

Dor Salamah (Sabah) is a village of Sibah district in the Abyan Governorate, Yemen. According to the 2004 census, it has a population of 81.
