= Al Mahalla =

Al Mahalla may refer to:

- Almahalla SC, a football club in Libya
- El Mahalla El Kubra, a city in northeast Egypt
- Al Mahal, a village in southwest Yemen

== See also ==
- Al-Muhalla
