= Al-Alam (disambiguation) =

Al-Alam is an arabophone Moroccan newspaper of the nationalist Istiqlal party.

Al-Alam may also refer to:

- Al-Alam (magazine), an Egyptian magazine
- Al-Alam (book) a biographical work first published in the 1920s regarding important Arabs in history
- Al-Alam (Syria), a Syrian Daily newspaper founded in 1944
- Al-Alam News Network, an Iranian TV channel
- Al Alam Palace, the ceremonial palace of Sultan Qaboos of Oman located in Old Muscat, Oman
- Al `Alam a village in south-western Yemen
