= Naʽb =

Coordinates: 13°29′N 45°36′E

- Interactive map of Naʽb
- Country: Yemen
- Governorate: Abyan Governorate
- District: Lawdar District
- Time zone: UTC+3 (Yemen Standard Time)

Naʽb (Arabic: ناعب) is a village in south-western Yemen. It is located in the Abyan Governorate, Lawdar District.
