= Abu Amir =

- Location in Yemen
- Coordinates: 13°23′11″N 45°24′47″E
- Country: Yemen
- Governorate: Abyan
- Time zone: UTC+3 (Yemen Standard Time)

Abu Amir (ابو امیر) is a village in south-western Yemen. It is located in the Abyan Governorate on a wadi to the northeast of Jaʽar.
