= Zinjibar district =

Zinjibar District مُدِيْرِيَّة زِنْجِبَار
- District
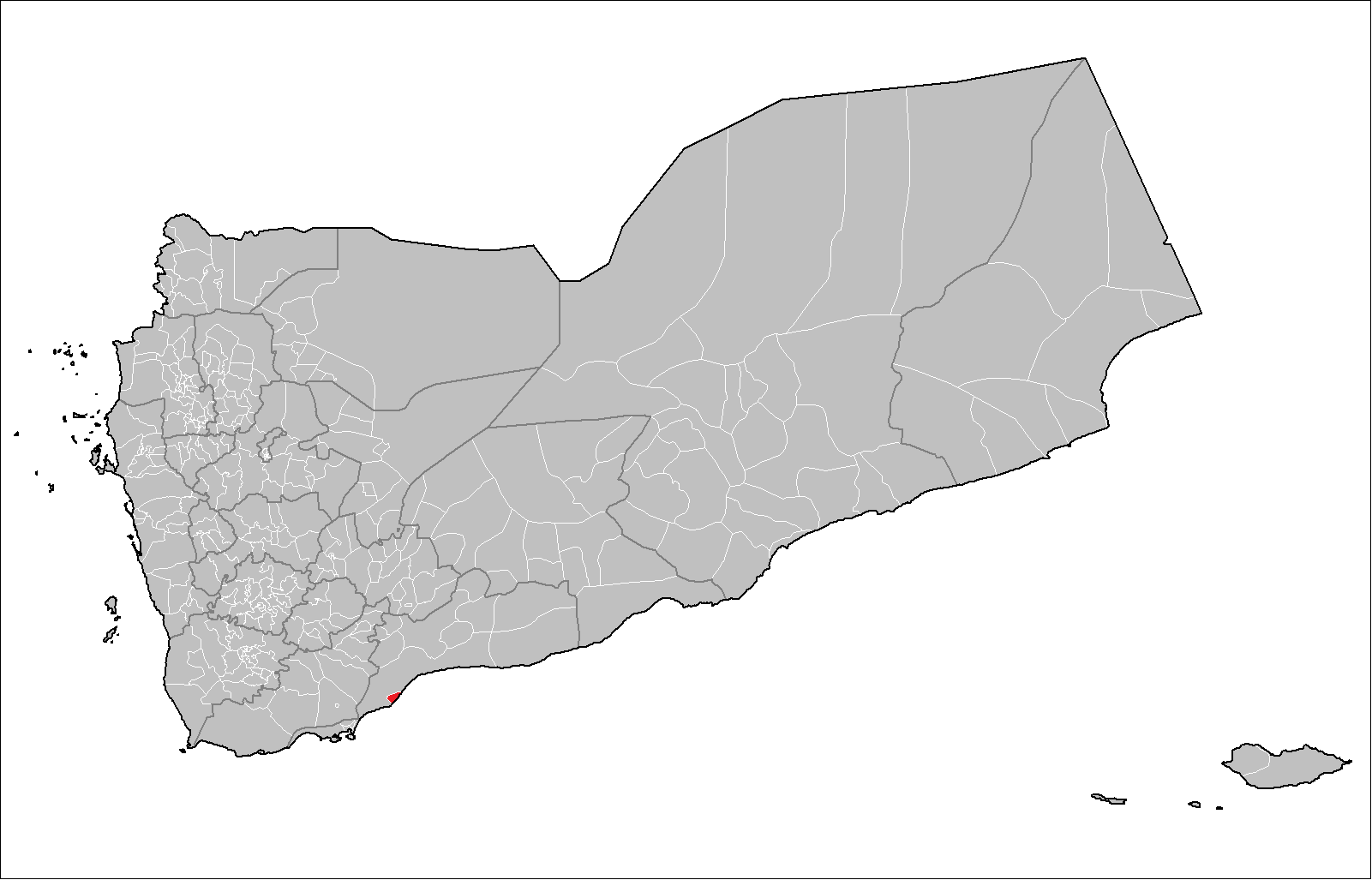
- Coordinates: 13°7′42″N 45°22′49″E
- Country: Yemen
- Governorate: Abyan
- Capital: Zinjibar

Population (2003)
  - Total: 25,524
- Time zone: UTC+3 (Yemen Standard Time)

Zinjibar District (Arabic: مُدِيْرِيَّة زِنْجِبَار) or Zingibar District is a district of the Abyan Governorate, Yemen. As of 2003, the district had a population of 25,524 inhabitants.
