= Ad Diyyu =

Coordinates: 13°09′N 45°19′E

Ad diyyu
- Interactive map of Ad diyyu
- Country: Yemen
- Governorate: Abyan Governorate
- Time zone: UTC+3 (Yemen Standard Time)

Ad diyyu is a village in south-western Yemen. It is located in the Abyan Governorate.
