= Kabaran =

Coordinates: 13°56′N 46°02′E

- Interactive map of Kabaran
- Country: Yemen
- Governorate: Abyan
- Time zone: UTC+3 (Yemen Standard Time)

Kabaran is a village in south-western Yemen. It is located in the Abyan Governorate.
