= Maṣadiʽah =

Coordinates: 13°13′N 45°16′E

- Interactive map of Maṣadiʽah
- Country: Yemen
- Governorate: Abyan
- Time zone: UTC+3 (Yemen Standard Time)

Maṣadiʽah (مصاديعة) is a village in south-western Yemen. It is located in the Abyan Governorate.
