= Ba Tays =

Coordinates: 13°20′N 45°18′E

- Interactive map of Ba Tays
- Country: Yemen
- Governorate: Abyan
- Time zone: UTC+3 (Yemen Standard Time)

Ba Tays is a village in the Republic of Yemen. Follow the geography of the province of Abyan and administratively to the Directorate Khanfar. With a population of 6222 people, according to census conducted in 2004.
