= Sakin Ahl Hidran =

Coordinates: 13°42′N 45°55′E

Sakin ahl hidran
- Interactive map of Sakin ahl hidran
- Country: Yemen
- Governorate: Abyan Governorate
- Time zone: UTC+3 (Yemen Standard Time)

Sakin ahl hidran is a village in south-western Yemen. It is located in the Abyan Governorate.
