= Jirshab =

Coordinates: 13°55′N 46°04′E

- Interactive map of Jirshab
- Country: Yemen
- Governorate: Abyan
- Time zone: UTC+3 (Yemen Standard Time)

Jirshab is a village in south-western Yemen. It is located in the Abyan Governorate.
