= Jiblat Al Waznah =

Coordinates: 13°54′N 46°07′E

Jiblat al waznah
- Interactive map of Jiblat al waznah
- Country: Yemen
- Governorate: Abyan
- Time zone: UTC+3 (Yemen Standard Time)

Jiblat al waznah is a village in south-western Yemen. It is located in the Abyan Governorate.
