= Al Hisn, Yemen =

Al hisn
- Location in Yemen
- Coordinates: 13°17′35″N 45°17′42″E
- Country: Yemen
- Governorate: Abyan
- Time zone: UTC+3 (Yemen Standard Time)

Al hisn is a village in south-western Yemen. It is located in the Abyan Governorate.
