= Sayhan =

- Interactive map of Sayhan
- Coordinates: 13°11′N 45°17′E
- Country: Yemen
- Governorate: Abyan Governorate
- Time zone: UTC+3 (Yemen Standard Time)

Sayhan is a village in south-western Yemen. It is located in the Abyan Governorate.
