= Sakin Ahl Wuhaysh =

Coordinates: 14°08′N 45°54′E

Sakin ahl wuhaysh
- Interactive map of Sakin ahl wuhaysh
- Country: Yemen
- Governorate: Abyan Governorate
- Time zone: UTC+3 (Yemen Standard Time)

Sakin ahl wuhaysh is a village in south-western Yemen. It is located in the Abyan Governorate.
