= Qaryat Ahl Hidran =

Coordinates: 13°43′N 45°56′E

Qaryat ahl hidran
- Interactive map of Qaryat ahl hidran
- Country: Yemen
- Governorate: Abyan
- Time zone: UTC+3 (Yemen Standard Time)

Qaryat ahl hidran is a village in south-western Yemen. It is located in the Abyan Governorate.
