= Sakin Wuʽays =

Coordinates: 13°13′N 45°17′E

- Interactive map of Sakin Wuʽays
- Country: Yemen
- Governorate: Abyan
- Time zone: UTC+3 (Yemen Standard Time)

Sakin Wuʽays is a village in south-western Yemen. It is located in the Abyan Governorate.
