= As Suda' =

As suda'
- Country: Yemen
- Governorate: Abyan
- Time zone: UTC+3 (Yemen Standard Time)

As suda' is a village in south-western Yemen. It is located in the Abyan Governorate.
