= Jiblat Al Faraj =

Coordinates: 13°56′N 46°05′E

- Interactive map of Jiblat Al Faraj
- Country: Yemen
- Governorate: Abyan
- Time zone: UTC+3 (Yemen Standard Time)

Jiblat Al Faraj is a village in south-western Yemen. It is located in the Abyan Governorate.
