= Naqʽal =

Coordinates: 13°55′N 46°10′E

- Interactive map of Naqʽal
- Country: Yemen
- Governorate: Abyan Governorate
- Time zone: UTC+3 (Yemen Standard Time)

Naqʽal is a village in south-western Yemen. It is located in the Abyan Governorate.
