= Al Mahlaj =

Al mahlaj
- Location in Yemen
- Coordinates: 13°05′N 45°21′E
- Country: Yemen
- Governorate: Abyan
- Time zone: UTC+3 (Yemen Standard Time)

Al mahlaj is a village in south-western Yemen. It is located in the Abyan Governorate.
