= Al-Makhzan al-Qaʽi =

Coordinates: 13°11′N 45°19′E

- Interactive map of Al-Makhzan al-Qaʽi
- Country: Yemen
- Governorate: Abyan
- Time zone: UTC+3 (Yemen Standard Time)

Al-Makhzan al-Qaʽi (المخزن القاعی) is a village in south-western Yemen. It is located in the Abyan Governorate.
