= Shurjan =

Coordinates: 14°01′N 45°48′E

- Interactive map of Shurjan
- Country: Yemen
- Governorate: Abyan Governorate
- Time zone: UTC+3 (Yemen Standard Time)

Shurjan is a village in south-western Yemen. It is located in the Abyan Governorate.
