= ʽAwrumah =

Coordinates: 13°55′N 46°07′E

`Awrumah
- Interactive map of `Awrumah
- Country: Yemen
- Governorate: Abyan
- Time zone: UTC+3 (Yemen Standard Time)

`Awrumah is a village in south-western Yemen. It is located in the Abyan Governorate.
