= Barkan, Yemen =

Coordinates: 13°55′N 45°44′E

Barkan
- Interactive map of Barkan
- Country: Yemen
- Governorate: Abyan
- Time zone: UTC+3 (Yemen Standard Time)

Barkan (Arabic: باركان) is a village in southwestern Yemen. It is located in the Abyan Governorate.
