= Ahl Fashshash =

Coordinates: 13°49′N 46°06′E

- Interactive map of Ahl Fashshash
- Country: Yemen
- Governorate: Abyan Governorate
- Time zone: UTC+3 (Yemen Standard Time)

Ahl Fashshash is a village in south-western Yemen. It is located in the Abyan Governorate. Its nearest airport is Aden International Airport.
