= Maghadih =

Coordinates: 13°53′N 45°50′E

- Interactive map of Maghadih
- Country: Yemen
- Governorate: Abyan
- Time zone: UTC+3 (Yemen Standard Time)

Maghadih is a village in south-western Yemen. It is located in the Abyan Governorate.
