= Ath Thalib =

Coordinates: 13°50′N 46°03′E

Ath thalib
- Interactive map of Ath thalib
- Country: Yemen
- Governorate: Abyan
- Time zone: UTC+3 (Yemen Standard Time)

Ath Thalib is a village in south-western Yemen. It is located in the Abyan Governorate.
