= Ahmad Ash Shaykh =

Coordinates: 13°48′N 46°00′E

Ahmad ash shaykh
- Interactive map of Ahmad ash shaykh
- Country: Yemen
- Governorate: Abyan
- Time zone: UTC+3 (Yemen Standard Time)

Ahmad ash shaykh (Urdu: احمد الشیخ) is a village in south-western Yemen. It is located in the Abyan Governorate.
