= Maqdah =

Coordinates: 13°28′N 45°27′E

- Interactive map of Maqdah
- Country: Yemen
- Governorate: Abyan
- Time zone: UTC+3 (Yemen Standard Time)

Maqdah is a village in south-western Yemen located in the Abyan Governorate.
