= As Sarriyah =

As sarriyah
- Country: Yemen
- Governorate: Abyan
- Time zone: UTC+3 (Yemen Standard Time)

As sarriyah is a village in south-western Yemen. It is located in the Abyan Governorate.
