= Sarar district =

Coordinates: 13°35′N 45°20′E

Sarar District
- District
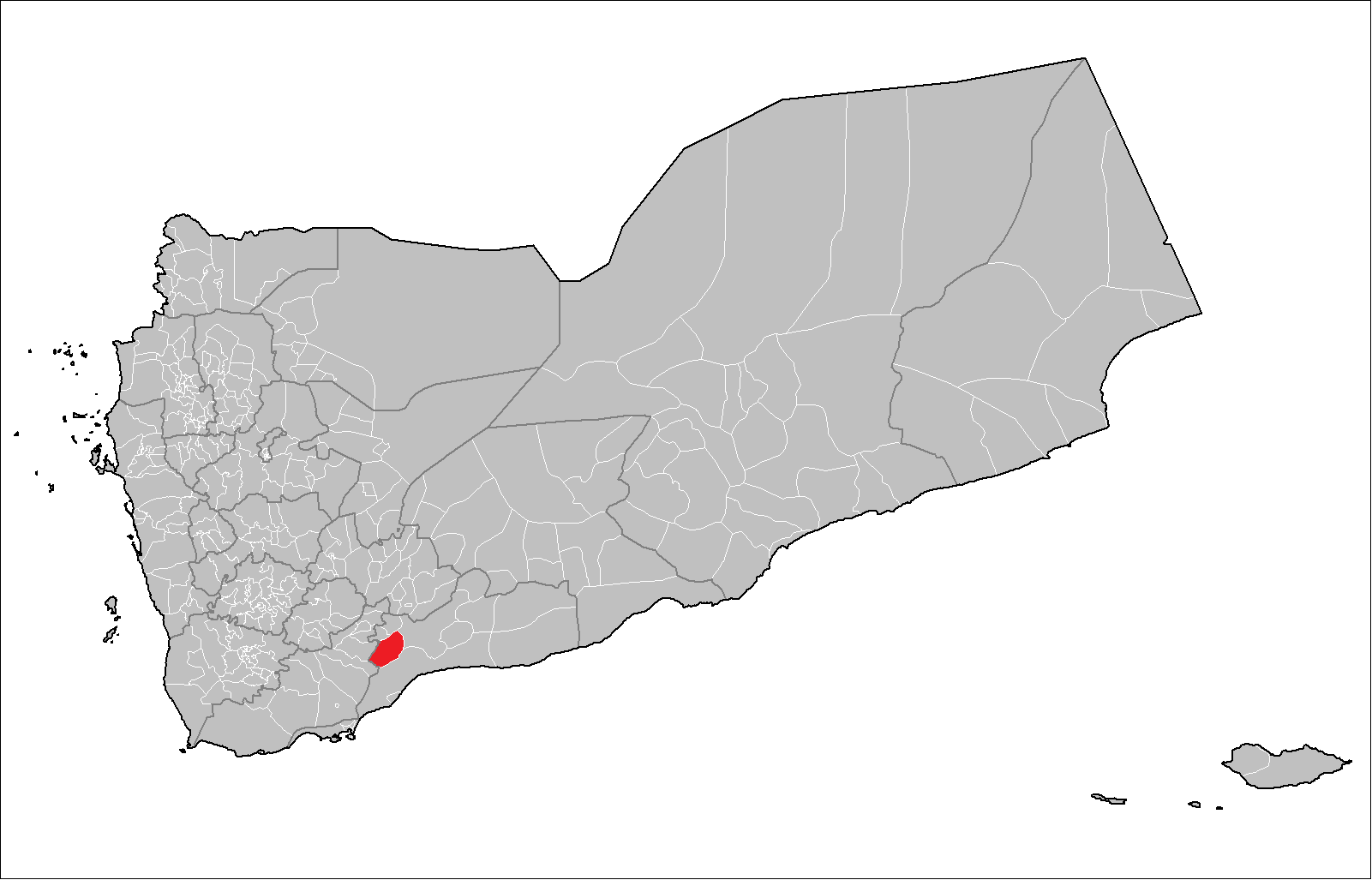
- Country: Yemen
- Governorate: Abyan

Population (2003)
  - Total: 15,093
- Time zone: UTC+3 (Yemen Standard Time)

Sarar District is a district of the Abyan Governorate, Yemen. As of 2003, the district had a population of 15,093 inhabitants.
