= Kadamat Al Faysh =

Coordinates: 13°05′N 45°20′E

Kadamat al faysh
- Interactive map of Kadamat al faysh
- Country: Yemen
- Governorate: Abyan
- Time zone: UTC+3 (Yemen Standard Time)

Kadamat al faysh is a village in south-western Yemen. It is located in the Abyan Governorate.
