= Ar Rawwa =

Coordinates: 13°17′N 45°17′E

Ar rawwa
- Interactive map of Ar rawwa
- Country: Yemen
- Governorate: Abyan
- Time zone: UTC+3 (Yemen Standard Time)

Ar rawwa is a village in south-western Yemen. It is located in the Abyan Governorate.
