= Munab =

Coordinates: 14°07′N 45°54′E

- Interactive map of Munab
- Country: Yemen
- Governorate: Abyan Governorate
- Time zone: UTC+3 (Yemen Standard Time)

Munab is a village in south-western Yemen. It is located in the Abyan Governorate.
