= Al Bahitah =

Al bahitah
- Village
- Location in Yemen
- Coordinates: 13°12′N 45°25′E
- Country: Yemen
- Governorate: Abyan
- Time zone: UTC+3 (Yemen Standard Time)

Al bahitah is a village in south-western Yemen. It is located in the Abyan Governorate.
