= ʽAmudiyah =

Coordinates: 13°08′N 45°22′E

`Amudiyah
- Interactive map of `Amudiyah
- Country: Yemen
- Governorate: Abyan
- Time zone: UTC+3 (Yemen Standard Time)

`Amudiyah is a village in south-western Yemen. It is located in the Abyan Governorate.
