= Bathan =

Coordinates: 14°05′N 45°55′E

- Interactive map of Bathan
- Country: Yemen
- Governorate: Abyan
- Time zone: UTC+3 (Yemen Standard Time)

Bathan is a village in south-western Yemen. It is located in the Abyan Governorate.
