= Shaykh ʽAbdallah =

Place in Abyan

Coordinates: 13°04′N 45°24′E

- Interactive map of Shaykh ʽAbdallah
- Country: Yemen
- Governorate: Abyan
- Time zone: UTC+3 (Yemen Standard Time)

Shaykh ʽAbdallah is a village in south-western Yemen. It is located in the Abyan Governorate.
