= Al Khawr, Yemen =

Al khawr
- Location in Yemen
- Coordinates: 13°13′47″N 45°21′27″E
- Country: Yemen
- Governorate: Abyan
- Time zone: UTC+3 (Yemen Standard Time)

Al khawr is a village in south-western Yemen. It is located in the Abyan Governorate.
