= Kawd al-ʽAbadil =

- Interactive map of Kawd al-ʽAbadil
- Coordinates: 13°4′N 45°22′E
- Country: Yemen
- Governorate: Abyan
- Time zone: UTC+3 (Yemen Standard Time)

Kawd al-ʽAbadil is a village in south-western Yemen. It is located in the Abyan Governorate.
