= Ad Dirjaj =

Coordinates: 13°16′N 45°21′E

- Interactive map of Ad Dirjaj
- Country: Yemen
- Governorate: Abyan
- Time zone: UTC+3 (Yemen Standard Time)

Ad Dirjaj is a village in south-western Yemen. It is located in the Abyan Governorate.
