= Shaykh Salim =

Coordinates: 13°11′N 45°29′E

Shaykh salim
- Interactive map of Shaykh salim
- Country: Yemen
- Governorate: Abyan
- Time zone: UTC+3 (Yemen Standard Time)

Shaykh salim is a village in south-western Yemen. It is located in the Abyan Governorate.
