= Al Qarn =

Al qarn
- Country: Yemen
- Governorate: Abyan
- Time zone: UTC+3 (Yemen Standard Time)

Al qarn is a village in south-western Yemen. It is located in the Abyan Governorate.
