= ʽAryab =

Coordinates: 13°56′N 45°42′E

- Interactive map of ʽAryab
- Country: Yemen
- Governorate: Abyan
- Time zone: UTC+3 (Yemen Standard Time)

ʽAryab is a village in south-western Yemen. It is located in the Abyan Governorate.
