= Ahl Fulays =

Coordinates: 13°18′N 45°20′E

Ahl fulays
- Interactive map of Ahl fulays
- Country: Yemen
- Governorate: Abyan
- Time zone: UTC+3 (Yemen Standard Time)

Ahl Fulays is a village in south-western Yemen. It is located in the Abyan Governorate.
