= An Nashsh =

Coordinates: 13°06′N 45°22′E

An nashsh
- Interactive map of An nashsh
- Country: Yemen
- Governorate: Abyan Governorate
- Time zone: UTC+3 (Yemen Standard Time)

An Nashsh is a village in south-western Yemen. It is located in the Abyan Governorate.
