= Zughaynah =

- Location in Yemen
- Coordinates: 13°58′0″N 45°55′14″E
- Country: Yemen
- Governorate: Abyan
- Time zone: UTC+3 (Yemen Standard Time)

Zughaynah is a village in south-western Yemen. It is located in the Abyan Governorate.
