= Jiblat Badr =

Coordinates: 13°51′N 46°04′E

Jiblat badr
- Interactive map of Jiblat badr
- Country: Yemen
- Governorate: Abyan
- Time zone: UTC+3 (Yemen Standard Time)

Jiblat badr is a village in south-western Yemen. It is located in the Abyan Governorate.
