= Khabt Al Aslum =

Khabt al aslum
- Location in Yemen
- Coordinates: 13°7′58″N 45°17′2″E
- Country: Yemen
- Governorate: Abyan Governorate
- Time zone: UTC+3 (Yemen Standard Time)

Khabt al aslum is a village in south-western Yemen. It is located in the Abyan Governorate.
