= Thirah =

Coordinates: 13°53′N 45°48′E

- Interactive map of Thirah
- Country: Yemen
- Governorate: Abyan
- Time zone: UTC+3 (Yemen Standard Time)

Thirah is a village in south-western Yemen. It is located in the Abyan Governorate.
