= ʽArqub Umm Kubayr =

`Arqub umm kubayr
- Country: Yemen
- Governorate: Abyan
- Time zone: UTC+3 (Yemen Standard Time)

`Arqub umm kubayr is a village in south-western Yemen. It is located in the Abyan Governorate.
