= ʽArabah =

`Arabah
- Country: Yemen
- Governorate: Abyan
- Time zone: UTC+3 (Yemen Standard Time)

`Arabah is a village in south-western Yemen. It is located in the Abyan Governorate.
