= Al-Maʽar =

- Location in Yemen
- Coordinates: 13°24′N 45°27′E
- Country: Yemen
- Governorate: Abyan
- Time zone: UTC+3 (Yemen Standard Time)

Al-Maʽar (المعر) is a village in southwestern Yemen in the Abyan Governorate.
