= Shams Ad Din, Yemen =

Coordinates: 13°09′N 45°23′E

Shams ad Din
- Interactive map of Shams ad Din
- Country: Yemen
- Governorate: Abyan Governorate
- Time zone: UTC+3 (Yemen Standard Time)

Shams ad Din is a village in south-western Yemen. It is located in the Abyan Governorate.
