= Qaryat Husayn Umm Muhammad =

Village in south-western Yemen

Coordinates: 14°01′N 45°48′E

Qaryat husayn umm muhammad قرية حسين أم محمد
- Interactive map of Qaryat husayn umm muhammad
- Country: Yemen
- Governorate: Abyan
- Time zone: UTC+3 (Yemen Standard Time)

Qaryat husayn umm Muhammad is a village in south-western Yemen. It is located in the Abyan Governorate.
