= Maqasir =

Coordinates: 13°54′N 46°11′E

- Interactive map of Maqasir
- Country: Yemen
- Governorate: Abyan
- Time zone: UTC+3 (Yemen Standard Time)

Maqasir is a village in south-western Yemen. It is located in the Abyan Governorate.
