= Jawf Umm Maqbabah =

Coordinates: 13°50′N 45°50′E

Jawf umm maqbabah
- Interactive map of Jawf umm maqbabah
- Country: Yemen
- Governorate: Abyan
- Time zone: UTC+3 (Yemen Standard Time)

Jawf umm maqbabah is a village in south-western Yemen. It is located in the Abyan Governorate.
