= ʽAslan =

Coordinates: 13°10′N 45°21′E

`Aslan
- Interactive map of `Aslan
- Country: Yemen
- Governorate: Abyan
- Time zone: UTC+3 (Yemen Standard Time)

`Aslan is a village in south-western Yemen. It is located in the Abyan Governorate.
