= Sakin Ahl Mahathith =

Coordinates: 13°43′N 45°53′E

Sakin ahl mahathith
- Interactive map of Sakin ahl mahathith
- Country: Yemen
- Governorate: Abyan
- Time zone: UTC+3 (Yemen Standard Time)

Sakin ahl mahathith is a village in south-western Yemen. It is located in the Abyan Governorate.
