= Faris, Yemen =

Coordinates: 14°03′N 45°54′E

Faris
- Interactive map of Faris
- Country: Yemen
- Governorate: Abyan
- Time zone: UTC+3 (Yemen Standard Time)

Faris is a village in south-western Yemen. It is located in the Abyan Governorate.
