= Makrarah =

Coordinates: 13°50′N 45°58′E

- Interactive map of Makrarah
- Country: Yemen
- Governorate: Abyan
- Time zone: UTC+3 (Yemen Standard Time)

Makrarah is a village in south-western Yemen. It is located in the Abyan Governorate.
