= Ba Zulayfah =

Coordinates: 13°50′N 45°48′E

Ba zulayfah
- Interactive map of Ba zulayfah
- Country: Yemen
- Governorate: Abyan
- Time zone: UTC+3 (Yemen Standard Time)

Ba zulayfah is a village in south-western Yemen. It is located in the Abyan Governorate.
