= Mishal, Yemen =

Coordinates: 13°39′N 45°47′E

Mishal
- Interactive map of Mishal
- Country: Yemen
- Governorate: Abyan
- Time zone: UTC+3 (Yemen Standard Time)

Mishal is a village in south-western Yemen. It is located in the Abyan Governorate.
