= Shubram =

Coordinates: 13°49′N 45°52′E

- Interactive map of Shubram
- Country: Yemen
- Governorate: Abyan Governorate
- Time zone: UTC+3 (Yemen Standard Time)

Shubram is a village in south-western Yemen. It is located in the Abyan Governorate.
