= As Samn =

Coordinates: 13°27′N 45°29′E

As samn
- Interactive map of As samn
- Country: Yemen
- Governorate: Abyan Governorate
- Time zone: UTC+3 (Yemen Standard Time)

As Samn is a village in south-western Yemen. It is located in the Abyan Governorate.
