= Kawrat Halimah =

Kawrat halimah
- Location in Yemen
- Coordinates: 13°46′N 45°59′E
- Country: Yemen
- Governorate: Abyan
- Time zone: UTC+3 (Yemen Standard Time)

Kawrat halimah is a village in south-western Yemen. It is located in the Abyan Governorate.
