= Qarn al-Wadiʽ =

Coordinates: 13°47′N 45°59′E

- Interactive map of Qarn al-Wadiʽ
- Country: Yemen
- Governorate: Abyan
- Time zone: UTC+3 (Yemen Standard Time)

Qarn al-Wadiʽ is a village in south-western Yemen. It is located in the Abyan Governorate.
