= Sakin Hazm =

Coordinates: 13°52′N 45°48′E

Sakin hazm
- Interactive map of Sakin hazm
- Country: Yemen
- Governorate: Abyan Governorate
- Time zone: UTC+3 (Yemen Standard Time)

Sakin hazm is a village in south-western Yemen. It is located in the Abyan Governorate.
