= Sakin Ahl Sadah =

Coordinates: 13°50′N 45°56′E

Sakin ahl sadah
- Interactive map of Sakin ahl sadah
- Country: Yemen
- Governorate: Abyan
- Time zone: UTC+3 (Yemen Standard Time)

Sakin ahl sadah is a village in south-western Yemen. It is located in the Abyan Governorate.
