= Kuwashi =

Coordinates: 14°01′N 45°47′E

Kuwashi كوشى (Arabic)
- Interactive map of Kuwashi
- Country: Yemen
- Governorate: Abyan Governorate
- Time zone: UTC+3 (Yemen Standard Time)

Kuwashi (Arabic: كوشى) is a village in south-western Yemen. It is located in the Abyan Governorate.
