= At Tariyah =

At tariyah
- Hamlet
- Interactive map of At tariyah
- Coordinates: 13°13′14″N 45°24′37″E
- Country: Yemen
- Governorate: Abyan
- Elevation: 98 ft (30 m)
- Time zone: UTC+3 (Arabia Standard Time)

At tariyah is a village in south-western Yemen. It is located in the Abyan Governorate.
