= Al Kawd =

- Town
- Location in Yemen
- Coordinates: 13°05′19″N 45°21′53″E
- Country: Yemen
- Governorate: Abyan
- Time zone: UTC+3 (Yemen Standard Time)

Al Kawd is a town in southwestern Yemen, near Zinjibar. It is located in Abyan Governorate and lies on the Gulf of Aden, approximately 40 kilometres by road east of Aden. The Wadi Bana, a major river, flows into the sea to the east of the town.

== History ==
On May 19-20, 1994, during the 1994 civil war in Yemen, rebel planes dropped two bombs near the cemetery in al-Kawd, killing four boys.

On 15 November 2011, fighters loyal to al-Qaeda in the Arabian Peninsula took over the town, a key part of the Battle of Zinjibar. Yemeni troops recaptured the town on August 14, 2016.

In 2019, the Security Belt Forces, a paramilitary aligned with the secessionist Southern Transitional Council, dislodged an estimated 350 pro-government forces from a military camp in Al Kawd, leading to four deaths.
