= Fadhli Sultanate =

Sultanate

Fadhli Sultanate السلطنة الفضلية
- State of the Federation of South Arabia
- 17th century–1967
- Flag

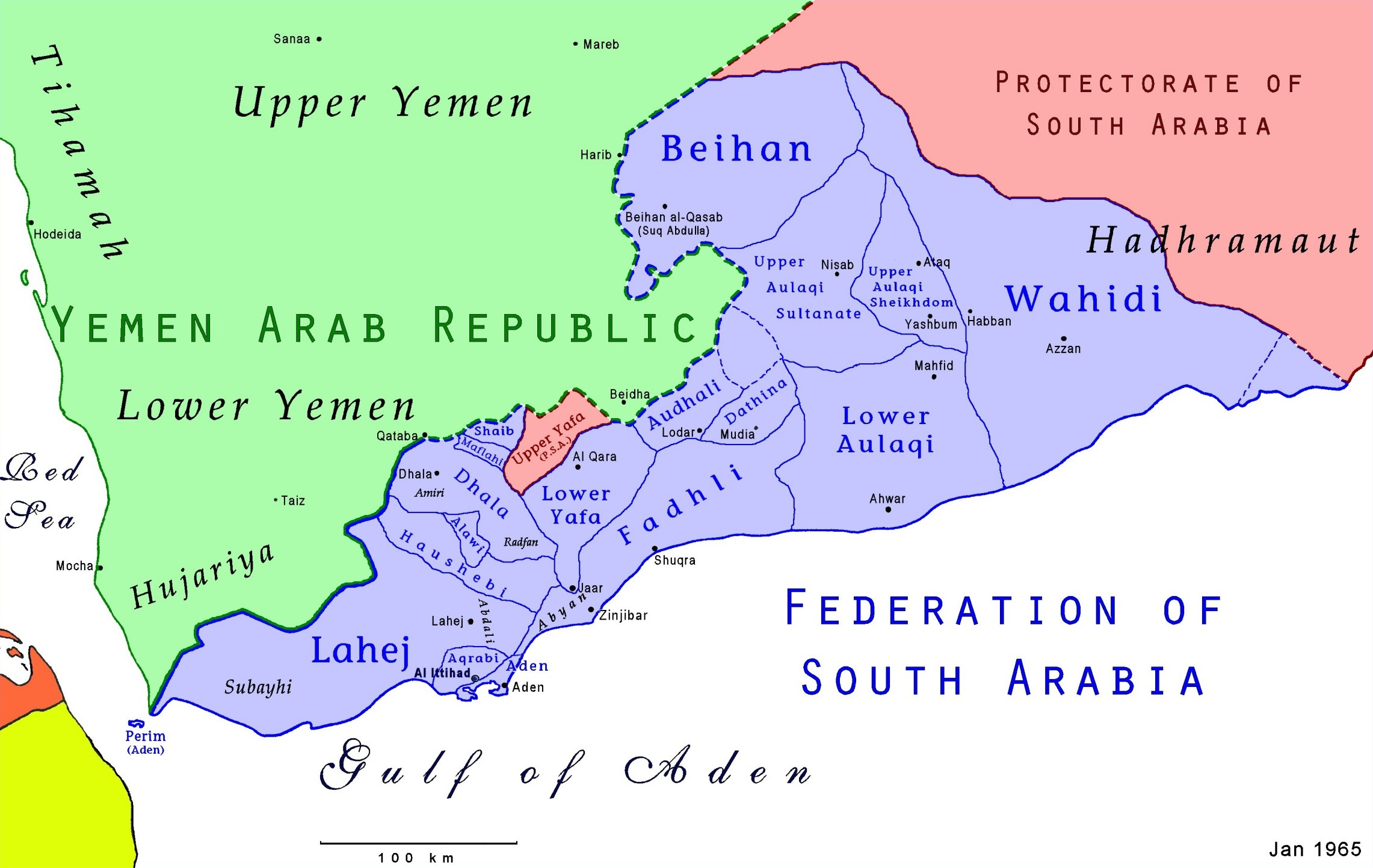
- Map of the Federation of South Arabia
- Capital: Shuqrah (till 1962); Zinjibar (1962–1967)
- Area
  - Coordinates: 13°25′N 45°40′E
- Population
  - 1931: 24,000
  - Type: Monarchy
- History
  - Documented since: 17th century
  - Disestablished: 1967
Succeeded by
South Yemen

Fadhli (Arabic: فضلي Faḍlī), or the Fadhli Sultanate (Arabic: السلطنة الفضلية Salṭanat al-Faḍlī), was an independent sultanate on the southern coast of the Arabian Peninsula from the 17th century until 1967.

British sources described the Fadhli as "one of the most powerful and warlike tribes near Aden".

== Geography ==
Their possessions lied to the north-east of Aden, and extended for a hundred miles along the coast from the eastern limits of Aden to the western boundary of the Aulaqi at Maqatin.

== History ==
An engagement was concluded between the British Government and the Fadhli in July 1839, after the capture of Aden. The Fadhli Sultanate was one of the original "Nine Cantons" that signed protection agreements with Great Britain in the early 20th century and became part of the British Aden Protectorate.

The Sultan of Lahej for many years paid annual subsidies to the neighbouring tribes, including the Fadhli, through whose territory the trade of the country passed, and these payments were at first continued by the British Government on condition of the Chiefs remaining in friendly alliance. Owing, however, to the weakness of the character of Sultan Ali bin Muhsin of Lahej, through whom it was the early policy of the British Agent to transact all business with the Arabs of the country round Aden, the neighbouring tribes ventured for some years to perpetrate a series of atrocities upon individual British officers and others, which the Sultan was quite unable to prevent or punish.

His efforts, indeed, to procure compliance with the demands of the British Government for satisfaction for these outrages brought on him the hostility of his rivals, the Fadhli tribe, who had sheltered some of the murderers, and who endeavoured to stir up the neighbouring tribes to hostilities with the British. The stipend of the Fadhli Chief, which had been assigned to him by the engagement of 1839, was stopped till he should expel the criminals who had taken refuge with him. This he did and, on the restoration of his stipend, he voluntarily signed an Agreement to protect the goods from Aden through his territory. But the inability of the Sultan of Lahej to prevent or punish crimes committed by the adjacent tribes necessitated a change in policy and the commencement of intercourse with their Chiefs directly, instead of through the Sultan as medium.

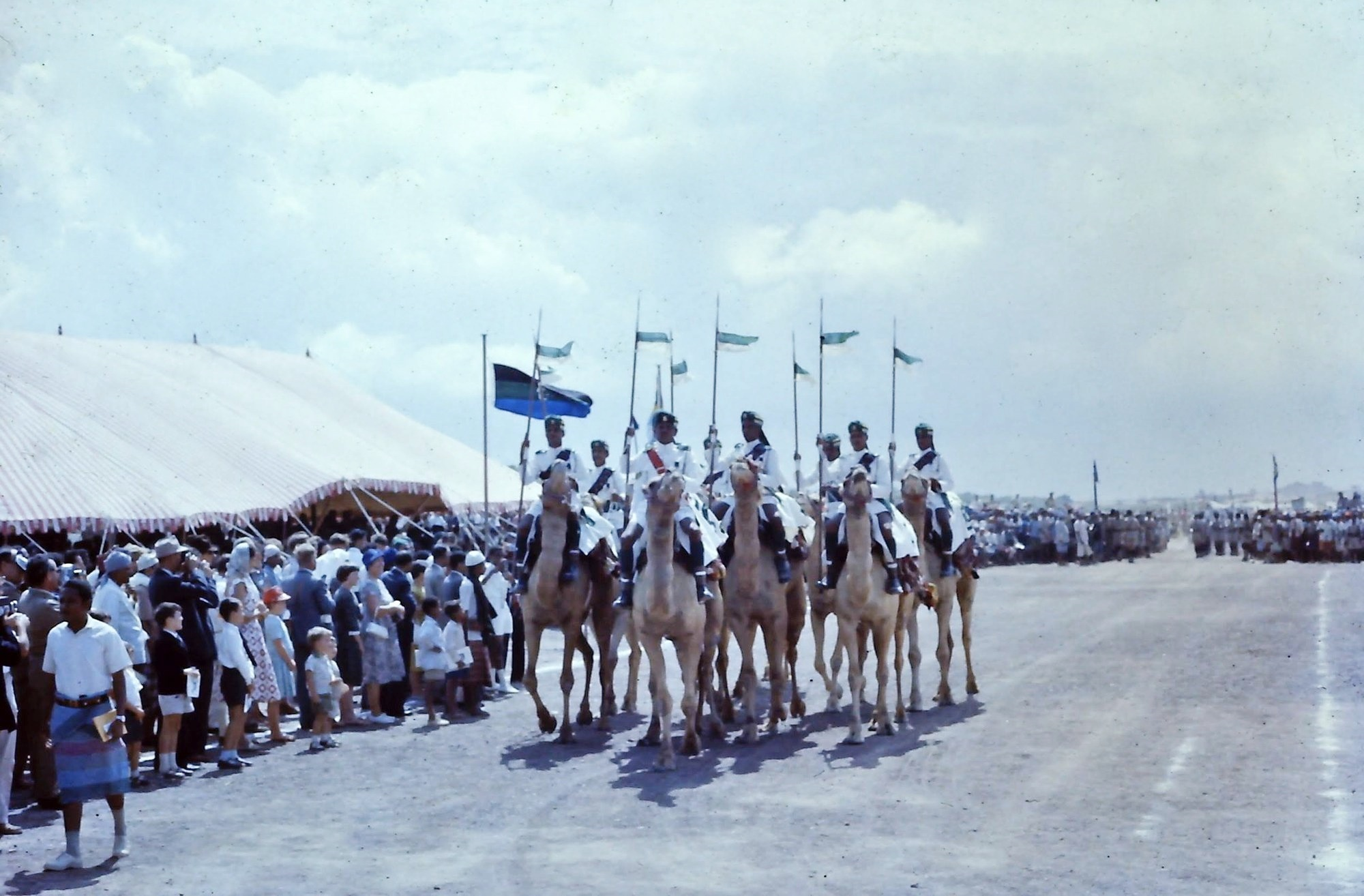
A detachment of Aden Protectorate Levies parading near Zinjibar, capital of the Fadhli Sultanate in 1962 or 1963. The event was part of celebrations linked to the creation of the new Federation of South Arabia. The flag is that of the Fadhli Sultanate.

For some years after the introduction of this system the conduct of the Fadhli Sultan, Ahmed bin Abdulla, was satisfactory. By his behaviour at the wreck of the Staelie in January 1864 he earned the approbation of the British Government; but soon afterwards, either from dissatisfaction at the amount of the reward granted to him for his services on this occasion, or out of jealousy at the intimacy of British relations with the Sultan of Lahej, he resumed his attitude of persistent hostility. Within gunshot of the fortifications of Aden he plundered a caravan, and assembled a large force with the object of destroying the crops of the Abdali and defying the authority of the British Government.

A small body of troops was accordingly despatched against him in December 1865; he was defeated and compelled to seek safety in flight, while the troops entered the Fadhli country and destroyed several villages. The seaport of Shuqra was at first spared, in hopes that the punishment already administered would prove sufficient; but, some further outrages having been perpetrated by the Fadhli, another expedition left Aden, destroyed the forts inland, and returned within three days, thus showing the Fadhli that they could be approached by land or by sea with equal facility. It was decided that either the Sultan or his son should enter Aden and tender unconditional submission before friendly relations could be resumed. All other overtimes were declined and, in March 1867, a letter was received from the Sultan stating his wish to send his elder son to tender the submission of the tribe. A safe conduct was granted and finally a Treaty, embodying the prescribed terms, was signed by the Sultan in 1867, the Resident agreeing on the part of the British Government that the past should be forgotten.

In 1931, this treaty had been authoritatively declared to be the only one in force. In accordance with article 4, a relation of the Sultan was deputed to reside in Aden as a permanent hostage; but, on his death in 1870, this article was allowed to remain in abeyance. Shortly after the ratification of the Treaty of 1867 the stipend of the Fadhli Sultan was raised from 30 dollars to 100 dollars a month. Sultan Ahmed bin Abdulla died in February 1870, and was succeeded by his eldest son, Haidara, who was assassinated in August 1877. His brother Sultan Husein was believed to be the murderer and was expelled by the tribe, who elected the latter’s son Ahmed to be their Chief. The succession was recognised by the British Government. In July 1879 Sultan Husein, being found to be implicated in certain intrigues, which had for their object a rebellion in the Fadhli country, was arrested and deported to Bombay. He was liberated in December 1886, and his conduct after his release gave no cause for uneasiness.

In 1872 the tribe agreed to abolish transit duties on goods conveyed to and from Aden through their territories, in consideration of which the Chief’s stipend was further increased to 180 dollars a month.

On 1 January 1877, it was formally gazetted that the Fadhli Sultan was entitled to a salute of 9 guns.

In 1881 a boundary dispute, which had long caused ill-feeling between the Fadhli and Abdali, was terminated by the conclusion of a Treaty defining their respective limits.

In 1883 it was reported that the Lower Aulaqi had invaded Fadhli territory, and a force was dispatched from Aden by sea and land to the assistance of the. latter. No invasion haying actually taken place, the force was withdrawn; but it did take place shortly afterwards and resulted in complete failure.

In 1888 territorial disputes arose between the Lower Yafai and the Fadhli and the former cut off the water supply of the Naza Canal; a desultory strife continued for some time between the tribes with occasional short truces.

In August 1888 a protectorate Treaty was concluded with the Fadhli, which was ratified on 26 February 1890.

In October 1891, in consequence of the misconduct of the Fadhli, it became necessary to impose a fine of Rs. 1,000 upon the Sultan, and to suspend the payment of his stipend. The advisability of reviving the fourth article of the agreement of 1867, requiring the residence of a Fadhli representative at Aden, was also taken into consideration. In December 1891, however, on his making full submission, the punishment was in part remitted by the Government of India.

In 1892 and the following year desultory strife, interrupted by short truces, continued with the Lower Yafai over the water supply of the Naza. In 1893 a truce was made for one year and was continued in 1894 and the following years.

The Marqashi also gave considerable trouble by plundering in British territory. The Sultan finally declared himself responsible for them.

In 1899 at the Sultan’s request his two brothers, Salih and Abdulla, were deported to India for conspiring against him. In 1900 Salih died at Karachi, and Abdulla was released.

Hostilities with the Yafai recommenced in consequence of the Sultan having established a new customs post at Zinjibar, for the purpose of levying dues on qafilahs. All efforts to effect a reconciliation failed, till in 1904 the Sultan visited the Resident at Aden,. and promised to stop levying dues and to abandon his post at Zinjibar.

In 1906 the Sultan was reported to have commenced levying transit dues on qafilahs at Zinjibar. In reply to representations on the subject be urged that these were only fees willingly paid for escorts furnished to caravans beyond his own limits, and the matter was not pursued.

Hostilities with the Lower Yafai continued intermittently.

In March 1907 Sultan Ahmed bin Husein died and was succeeded by his father Husein bin Ahmed.

The Sultan was considered disloyal during the Great War, on account of an agreement which he signed with the Turks at Lahej, and his stipend was stopped. After the Armistice he satisfactorily explained his conduct and the stipend was restored.

In 1924 the Sultan died and was succeeded by his grandson, Sultan Abdul Qadir.

In 1926 a truce was made between the Fadhli and the Lower Yafai for one year. This was subsequently extended to four years.

In March 1927 Sultan Abdul Qadir died and was succeeded by his uncle Sultan Abdulla bin Husein.

In June 1929 the Sultan of Lahej settled the long-standing quarrel between the Ahl Fadhl and the Lower Yafai. Khanfar was restored to Lower Yafai and the Fadhli Sultan was permitted to levy dues on Lower Yafai exports and imports passing through his territory at a fixed rate.

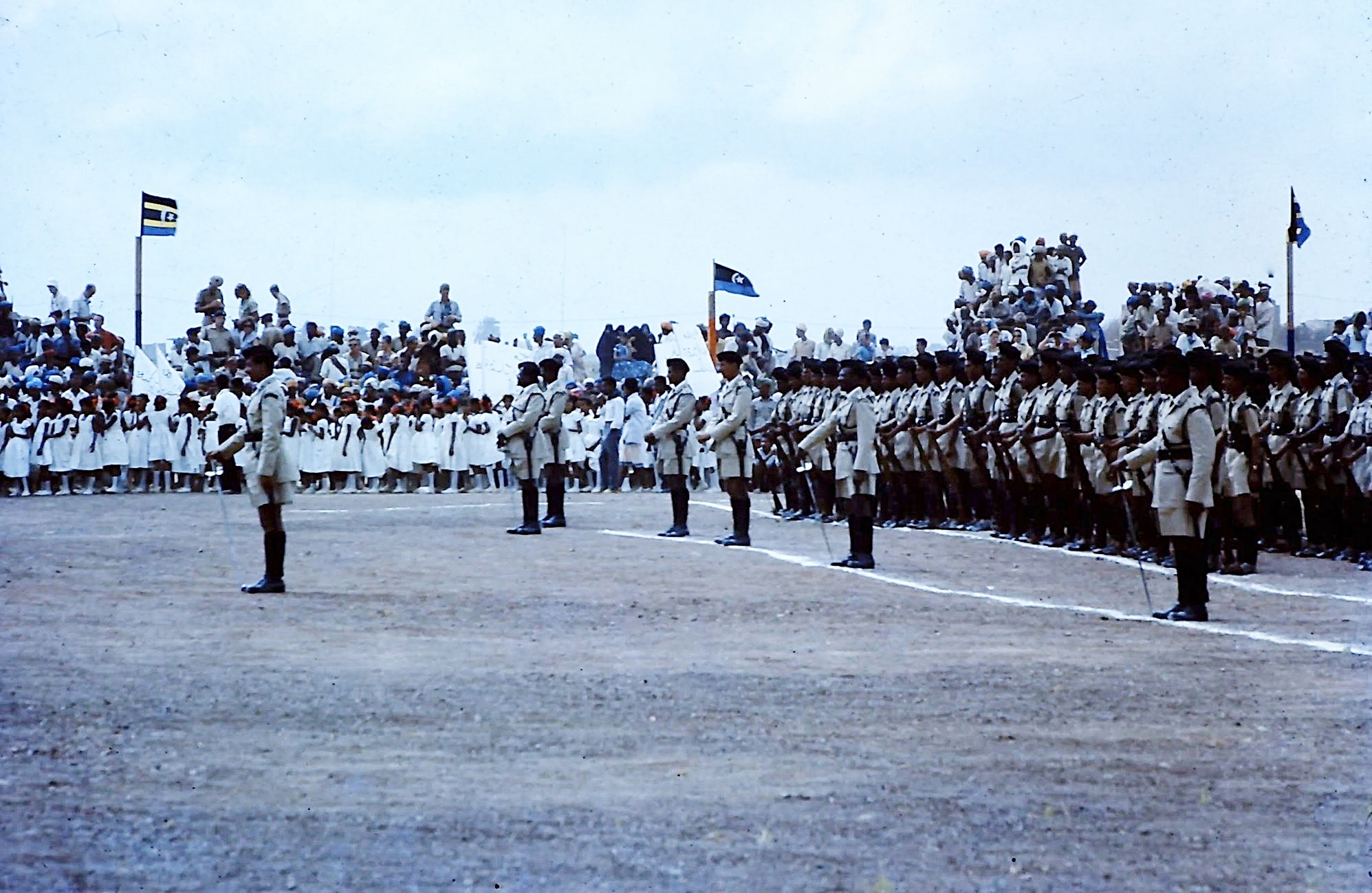
Military parade to celebrate the new Federation of South Arabia

In 1930, The population of the Fadhli Sultanate was estimated at 24,000, and the gross revenue at Hs. 35,000 a year.

The Fadhli Sultanate was a founding member of the Federation of Arab Emirates of the South in 1959, and of its successor, the Federation of South Arabia, in 1963. The capital of the Fadhlis was Shuqrah, located on the coast of the Gulf of Aden, until 1962, when the administrative capital was moved to Zinjibar, located about 60 km to the east of Aden, although the sultan's residence remained at Shuqrah.

The last sultan, Nasser bin Abdullah bin Hussein bin Ahmed al-Fadhli (السلطان ناصر بن عبدالله بن حسين بن أح), was deposed and the state was abolished in 1967 upon the founding of the People's Republic of South Yemen, which is now part of the Republic of Yemen.

=== Sultans ===
The Sultanate extended back at least to Othman who ruled until 1670. The sultans were:

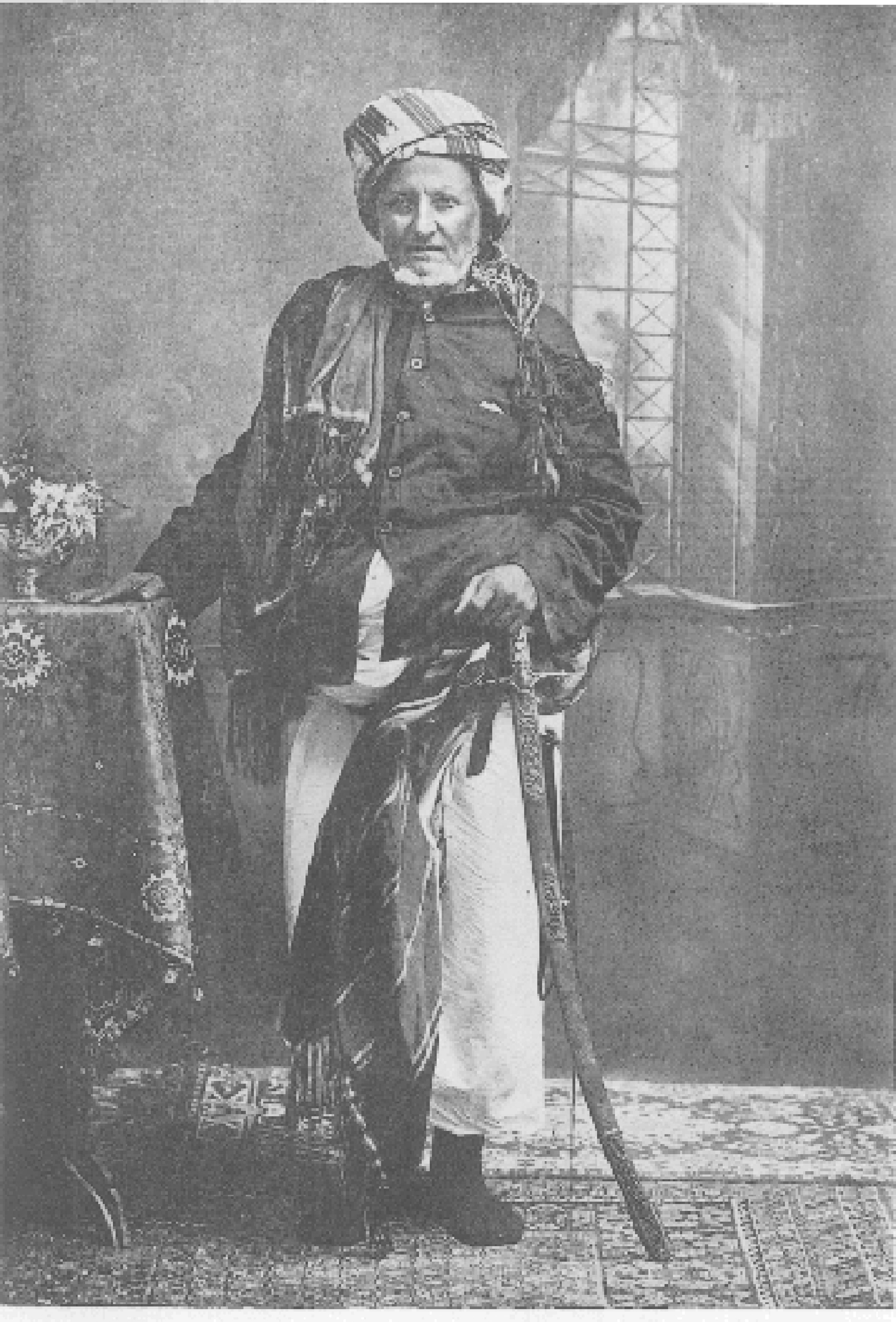
Sultan Hussein Bin Ahmed Bin Abdullah

- Othman (`Uthman), reigned ...–1670
- Fadhl I bin Othman, reigned 1670–1700
- Ahmed I bin Fadhl bin Othman, reigned 1700–1730
- Abdullah I bin Ahmed bin Fadhl, reigned 1730–1760
- Ahmed II bin Abdullah bin Ahmed, reigned 1760–1789
- Abdullah II, reigned 1789–1805
- Ahmed III bin Abdullah, reigned 1805–1819
- Abdullah III bin Ahmed bin Abdullah, reigned 1819–1828
- Ahmed IV bin Abdullah, reigned 1828–1870
- Haydara bin Ahmed bin Abdullah, reigned 1870–1877
- Hussein bin Ahmed bin Abdullah, reigned 1877 briefly
- Ahmed V bin Hussein bin Ahmed, 1877–1907, signed treaty with British 1888
- Hussein bin Ahmed bin Abdullah, second reign 1907–1924
- Abdul Qadir bin Ahmed bin Hussein, reigned 1924–1927
- Abdullah IV bin Hussein, reigned 1927–1929
- Fadhl II bin Hussein, reigned 1929–1933
- Abdul Karim, reigned 1933–1936
- Saleh bin Fadhl, reigned 1936–1941
- Abdullah V bin Othman (`Abd Allah ibn `Uthman), reigned 1941-1962, abdicated
- Ahmed VI bin Abdullah, reigned 1962–1964, abdicated
- Nasser bin Abdullah bin Hussein bin Ahmed, reigned 1964–1967, the last sultan
