= Al-Maṣaniʽ, Abyan =

Al-Maṣāniʽ
- Country: Yemen
- Governorate: Abyan
- Time zone: UTC+3 (Yemen Standard Time)

Al-Maṣāniʽ is a village in south-western Yemen. It is located in the Abyan Governorate. It is currently controlled by a faction of the Islamic State that split off from Ansar Al-Sharia to pledge allegiance to Abu Bakr al-Baghdadi. Several sources show that Al-Qaeda had disowned the faction.
