= Mansab, Yemen =

Coordinates: 13°54′N 45°44′E

Mansab
- Interactive map of Mansab
- Country: Yemen
- Governorate: Abyan Governorate
- Time zone: UTC+3 (Yemen Standard Time)

Mansab is a village in south-western Yemen. It is located in the Abyan Governorate.
