= Jahrah, Yemen =

Coordinates: 13°41′N 45°58′E

- Interactive map of Jahrah, Yemen
- Country: Yemen
- Governorate: Abyan
- Time zone: UTC+3 (Yemen Standard Time)

Jahrah, Yemen is a village in south-western Yemen. It is located in the Abyan Governorate.
