= Kawkab, Yemen =

Coordinates: 13°55′N 46°11′E

Kawkab
- Interactive map of Kawkab
- Country: Yemen
- Governorate: Abyan
- Time zone: UTC+3 (Yemen Standard Time)

Kawkab (in Arabic: كوكب) is a village in south-western Yemen. It is located in the Abyan Governorate. Kawkab means "planet" in Arabic.
