= Ar Rawdah, Abyan =

Ar rawdah
- Country: Yemen
- Governorate: Abyan
- Time zone: UTC+3 (Yemen Standard Time)

Ar rawdah is a village in south-western Yemen. It is located in the Abyan Governorate.
