= Al Bawaba =

Jordanian news website

- Native name: البوابة
- Available in: Arabic, English
- Founded: 2000
- Headquarters: Amman, Jordan
- Website: www.albawaba.com

Al Bawaba (Arabic: البوابة, lit. 'The Portal, The Gate') is a Middle East news, blogging and media website headquartered in Amman, Jordan with an office in Dubai, United Arab Emirates. Since 2001 it has published the Mena Report, which covers the business and economics in Arab world. Al Bawaba bills itself as "the largest independent producer and distributor of content in the Middle East... [with] a full-time staff of journalists and editors covering the Middle East and North Africa region's events and news".

== History and content ==
Al Bawaba was launched in 2000, and is owned by Al Bawaba Middle East Limited based in Amman, Jordan. It had an office in Kuwait.

The network consists of several web portals and websites besides Al Bawaba, including Al Bawaba Blogs, Al Bawaba Music (music site), Al Bawaba Games (Later Gaming Zone), Sharekna (online photo and video management service), and SyndiGate (digital content syndication service).
