= Al-ʽAlam =

Al-ʽAlam العالم
- Village
- Location in Yemen
- Coordinates: 13°53′N 45°45′E
- Country: Yemen
- Governorate: Abyan
- Time zone: UTC+3 (Yemen Standard Time)

Al-ʽAlam (العالم) is a village in south-western Yemen. It is located in the Abyan Governorate.
