= Al Mahal =

Coordinates: 13°08′N 45°22′E

Al mahal
- Interactive map of Al mahal
- Country: Yemen
- Governorate: Abyan
- Time zone: UTC+3 (Yemen Standard Time)

Al mahal is a village in south-western Yemen. It is located in the Abyan Governorate.
