= Khuban, Yemen =

Coordinates: 13°11′N 45°27′E

Khuban
- Interactive map of Khuban
- Country: Yemen
- Governorate: Abyan
- Time zone: UTC+3 (Yemen Standard Time)

Khuban is a village in south-western Yemen. It is located in the Abyan Governorate.
