= Al-Maṣaniʽ, Hadhramaut =

Coordinates: 13°47′21″N 44°19′40″E

Al-Maṣāniʽ
- Interactive map of Al-Maṣāniʽ
- Country: Yemen
- Governorate: Hadhramaut
- Time zone: UTC+3 (Yemen Standard Time)

Al-Maṣāniʽ is a village in eastern Yemen. It is located in the Hadhramaut Governorate.
