= Shuqrah =

Shuqrah شُقْرَة Shaqrāʾ (شَقْرَاء) Shuqrāʾ (شُقْرَاء)
- town
- Location in Yemen Shuqrah (Asia)
- Coordinates: 13°21′21″N 45°41′59″E
- Country: Yemen
- Governorate: Abyan
- Time zone: UTC+3 (Yemen Standard Time)

Shuqrah (Arabic: شُقْرَة), also Shaqrāʾ (Arabic: شَقْرَاء) or Shuqrāʾ (Arabic: شُقْرَاء), is a coastal town in southern Yemen. It was the capital of the Fadhli Sultanate until the capital moved to Zinjibar in 1962, although the royal residence remained in Shuqrah.

British explorers Theodore and Mabel Bent ended their final expedition to the region here in late March 1897. Sick with malaria, they were transported to hospital in Aden by dhow.

== See also ==
- Hadhramaut / Sarat Mountains
  - Harra es-Sawad
