= Jaar =

Jaʽār جعار
- Town
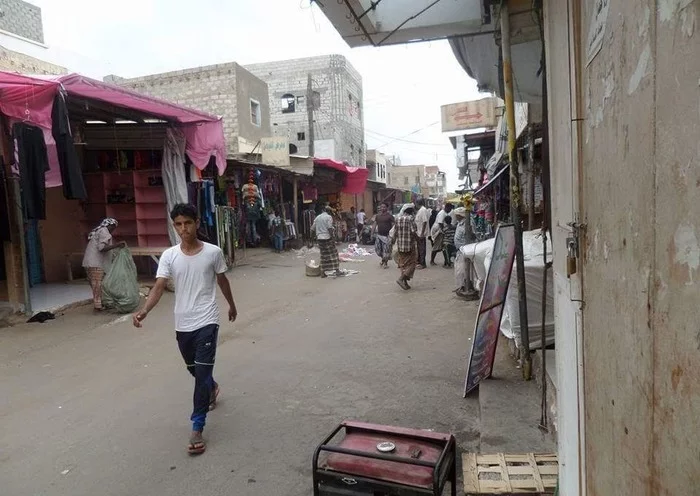
- A street in Jaar

- Location in Yemen
- Coordinates: 13°13′23″N 45°18′20″E
- Country: Yemen
- Governorate: Abyan Governorate
- District: Khanfar

Population (2004)
  - Total: 29,495
- Time zone: UTC+3 (Yemen Standard Time)

Jaʽar (Arabic: جعار Jaʿār) is a small town and the capital of Khanfir District in southwestern Yemen. One of the largest settlements in Abyan Governorate, it is located to the north of Al Kawd and the regional capital of Zinjibar. The town is located about 2 kilometres east of the right bank of the Wadi Bana.

Khanfar is a southern suburb of the town, noted for its ceramics and munitions production. On March 28, 2011, the Jaʿār munitions factory exploded there, killing an estimated 150 people.

The town was controlled by Ansar al-Sharia, a group affiliated with al-Qaeda, from March 2011 to June 2012. However, on 12 June 2012, the Yemeni Army retook control of Jaʽar along with Zinjibar. On 2 December 2015, Ansar al-Sharia captured Jaʽar from Hadi government forces. Zinjibar was also captured the same day.

In early May 2016, AQAP fighters withdrew from the city of Zinjibar and Jaar after negotiation with Hadi loyalists. Since then, it has repeatedly withdrawn and returned. On 14 August 2016, the cities were fully captured by pro-government forces who dislodged the militants.

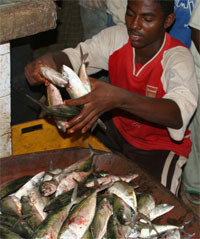
Jaʽar fish market
