= Wadi Bana =

Wadi of southwestern Yemen

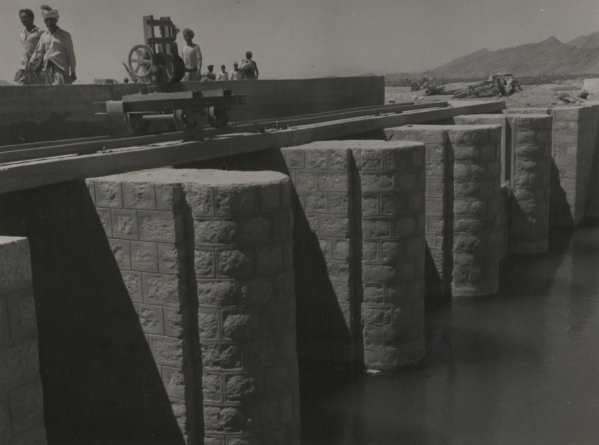
The Ba Tais Headworks which control the waters of the Wadi Bana

The Wadi Bana is a major wadi of southwestern Yemen. It flows from the mountains through the Abyan Governorate and eventually enters the Gulf of Aden in between the towns of Al Kawd (to the west) and the regional capital of Zinjibar (to the east). The wadi reportedly receives the most rainfall in the entire country, which accounts for the agricultural lands which have grown up near its mouth in an otherwise barren country. Its mouth is located at 13°03′52″N 45°23′10″E.

== See also ==
- List of wadis of Yemen
