= Sibah district =

Coordinates: 13°45′N 45°20′E

Sibah District
- District
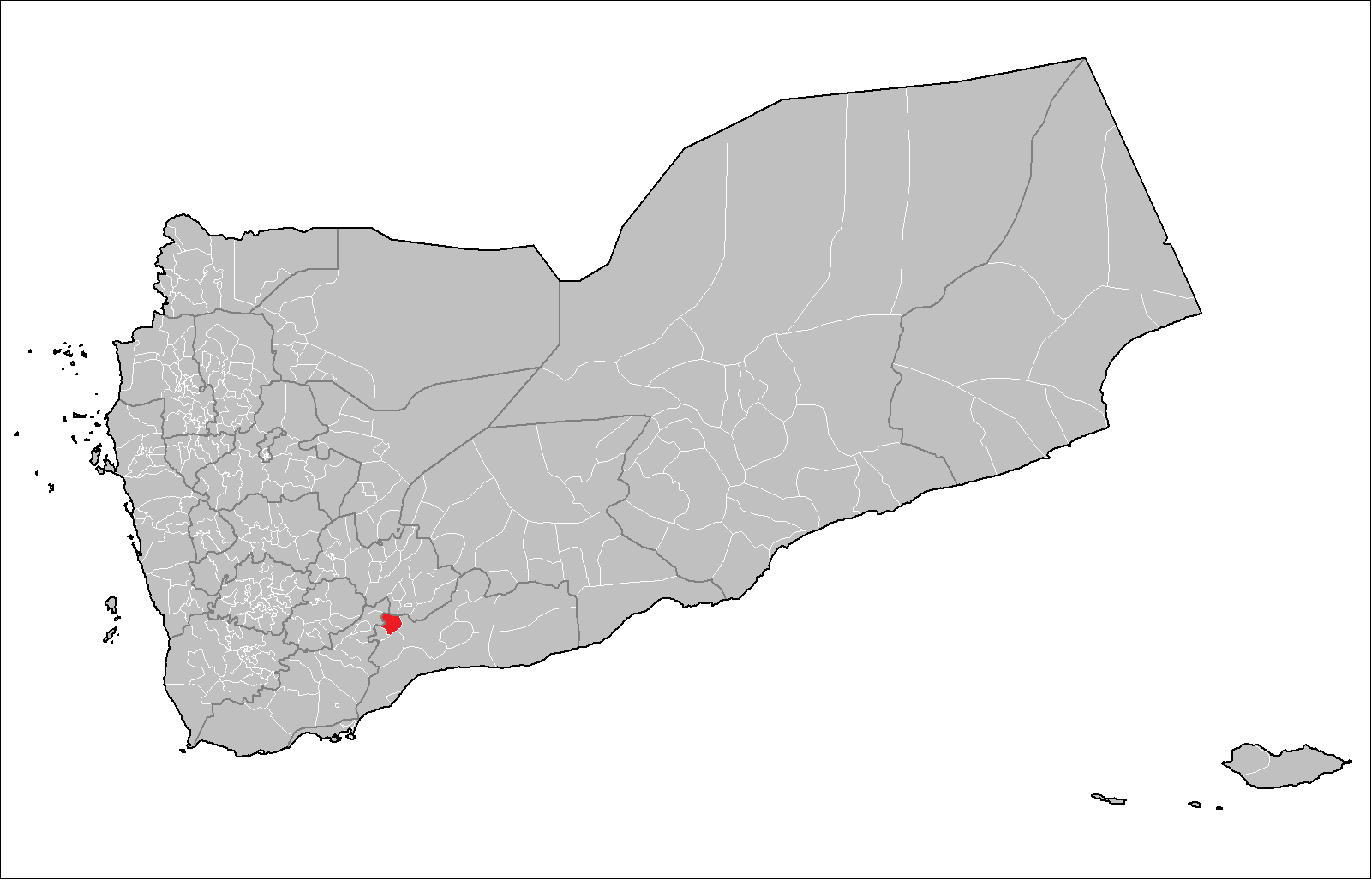
- Country: Yemen
- Governorate: Abyan

Population (2003)
  - Total: 15,996
- Time zone: UTC+3 (Yemen Standard Time)

Sibah District is a district of the Abyan Governorate, Yemen. As of 2003, the district had a population of 15,996 inhabitants.
