= Jayshan district =

Coordinates: 14°00′N 46°15′E

Jayshan District مديرية جيشان
- District
- Interactive map of Jayshan District
- Country: Yemen
- Governorate: Abyan

Population (2003)
  - Total: 14,800
- Time zone: UTC+3 (Yemen Standard Time)

Jayshan District is a district of the Abyan Governorate, Yemen. As of 2003, the district had a population of 14,800 inhabitants. The district was controlled by Al-Qaeda in the Arabian Peninsula until 2022, when STC forces moved into the region of Mudiyah and launched an offensive against AQAP forces defeating them and retaking the district.
