= Lawdar =

- Location in Yemen
- Coordinates: 13°53′N 45°52′E
- Country: Yemen
- Governorate: Abyan Governorate

Government
  - Control: (Islamic State) Al-Qaeda in the Arabian Peninsula
- Time zone: UTC+3 (Yemen Standard Time)

Lawdar is a town and seat of Lawdar District in south-western Yemen. It is located in the Abyan Governorate. It is served by Lawdar Airport.

== History ==
In October 2010, riots took place in Lawdar. A military force from Hadramut had to be sent in to maintain order. Dozens have been killed within Lawdar District in conflicts between the army and jihadists loyal to Al-Qaeda.

In January 2016, the Islamic State in Yemen took control of the town.

On July 5 2022, an explosion perpetrated by Al-Qaeda in the Arabian Peninsula killed 4 people and injured 20 others. The group has briefly taken control of the town.
