= Khanfir district =

Coordinates: 13°35′N 45°50′E

Khanfir District مديرية خنفر
- District
- Interactive map of Khanfir District
- Country: Yemen
- Governorate: Abyan

Population (2003)
  - Total: 109,044
- Time zone: UTC+3 (Yemen Standard Time)

Khanfir, Khanfyr or Khanfar district (Arabic: مديرية خنفر) is a district of the Abyan Governorate, Yemen. In the 19th century it was said to be inhabited by Yafa peoples. As of 2003, the district had a population of 109,044 inhabitants.

The district's capital is the town of Jaʽār.

== History ==
The business minded British had an influence in the 19th and 20th century in development with the Khanfar Development Board being financed by British loans. The British overlooked the construction of irrigation works and in 1947 the Khanfar scheme was reorganized as the Abyan Development Board, financed by credits of £170,000. Khanfar was noted for its ceramics, particularly its Rasulid glazed mustard wares.

In the mid 1980s, the Soviets built an ammunitions factory in Khanfar, for the manufacture of light weapons and Kalashnikov rifles. After the fall of the Soviet Union it continued to operate as a centre of weapons production. On March 28, 2011, an explosion occurred, killing some 150 people and injuring many more. This happened a day after around 30 armed al-Qaeda militants raided the ammunition plant, stealing cases of ammunition and leaving gunpowder exposed at the site. (Militants also took over another nearby munitions factory in Khanfar.) According to Al Jazeera, the initial fire was reportedly triggered by a local resident dropping a lit cigarette while inside the looted factory, while others were checking the site for weapons. This led to an explosion which was loud enough to be heard roughly 15 km (9.3 mi) from the factory, and left many charred bodies at the scene. Compiling the death toll was difficult as many bodies were found completely burnt through. Some of the injured people were taken to Jaʿār for treatment, while others received treatment at a hospital in Aden.
