= Abyan Governorate =

Governorate of Yemen

Coordinates: 13°20′N 45°23′E

Abyan أَبْيَنْ
- Governorate
- Country: Yemen
- Seat: Zinjibar

Government
  - Governor: Abu Bakr Hussein Salem

Area
  - Total: 21,939 km^{2} (8,471 sq mi)

Population (2012)
  - Total: 513,701
  - Density: 23.415/km^{2} (60.644/sq mi)
- Time zone: UTC+3 (Arabia Standard Time)

Abyan (Arabic: أَبْيَنْ ʾAbyan) is a governorate of Yemen. The Abyan region was historically part of the Fadhli Sultanate. It was a base to the Aden-Abyan Islamic Army militant group. Its capital is the city of Zinjibar. This governorate is noted for its agriculture, in particular the cultivation of date palms and animal husbandry.

== Recent history ==
On 31 March 2011, Al Bawaba reported that Al-Qaeda in the Arabian Peninsula (AQAP) had declared Abyan an "Al-Qaeda Emirate in Yemen" after seizing control of the region. The New York Times reported that those in control, while Islamic militants, are not in fact Al-Qaeda. This takeover was confirmed on May 28. Yemeni government forces launched an effort to re-establish control of the region, resulting in the Battle of Zinjibar.

In addition to Zinjibar, the towns of Jaʿār and Shuqrah were firmly under the control of the Islamists. In early May 2012 the Yemeni Army and Southern Resistance began a major offensive to wrest control of the province from militants. Government forces captured Zinjibar and Jaar on 12 June after a month of heavy fighting. Militants reportedly retreated towards the town of Shuqrah. In 2017, a military campaign led by Southern security forces and Southern resistance freed Abyan from the Islamist militants who escaped to their mountains in the Al Bayda and Marib Governorates.

== Geography ==
=== Adjacent governorates ===
Governorates of Yemen

- Aden Governorate (southwest)
- Al Bayda Governorate (north)
- Lahij Governorate (west)
- Shabwa Governorate (north, east)

=== Districts ===
Abyan Governorate is divided into the following 11 districts. These districts are further divided into sub-districts, and then further subdivided into villages:

- Ahwar district
- Al Mahfad district
- Al Wade'a district
- Jayshan district
- Khanfir district
- Lawdar district
- Mudiyah district
- Rasad district
- Sarar district
- Sibah district
- Zinjibar district

== Settlements ==
Abu `amir • Ad dirjaj • Ad diyyu • Ahl fashshash • Ahl fulays • Ahmad ash shaykh • Al `alam • Al bahitah • Al habil • Al hamam • Al hisn • Al jawl • Al kawd • Al kawr • Al khamilah • Al khawr • Al ma`ar • Al ma`jalah • Al mahal • Al mahlaj • Al makhzan al fawqi • Al makhzan al qa`i • Al masani` • Al qarn • Al qashabah • Al qurna`ah • An nashsh • Ar rawdah • Ar rawwa • As samn • As sarriyah • As suda' • Ash sha`bah • Ash sharaf • Ash sharqiyah • At tariyah • Ath thalib • `Ali hadi • `Amudiyah • `Arabah • `Arqub umm kubayr • `Aryab • `Aslan • `Awrumah • Ba tays • Ba zulayfah • Barkan • Bathan • Bayt samnah • Dor Salamah • Far`an • Faris • Ja`ar • Jahrah • Jawf umm maqbabah • Jiblat al faraj • Jiblat al waznah • Jiblat badr • Jirshab • Kabaran • Kadamat al faysh • Kawd al `abadil • Kawkab • Kawrat halimah • Khabt al aslum • Khanfar • Khuban • Kuwashi • Lawdar • Maghadih • Makrarah • Mansab • Maqasir • Maqdah • Marta`ah • Masadi`ah • Mishal • Mudiyah • Mukayras • Munab • Musaymir • Na`ab • Na`b • Namir • Naq`al • Qarn al wadi` • Qaryat ahl hidran • Qaryat husayn umm muhammad • Sakin ahl hidran • Sakin ahl mahathith • Sakin ahl sadah • Sakin ahl wuhaysh • Sakin hazm • Sakin wu`ays • Sayhan • Shams ad din • Shaykh `abdallah • Shaykh salim • Shubram • Shuqrah • Shurjan • Thirah • Wadibah • Zinjibar • Zughaynah
