= Zinjibar =

Zinjibar زنجبار
- Town
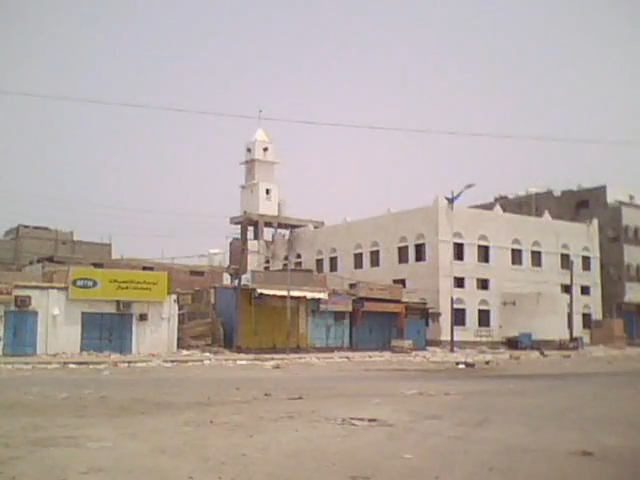
- Zinjibar in 2011, during the Battle of Zinjibar

- Location in Yemen
- Coordinates: 13°7′42″N 45°22′49″E
- Country: Yemen
- Governorate: Abyan
- District: Zinjibar
- Elevation: 16 ft (5 m)

Population (2004)
  - Total: 19,879
- Time zone: UTC+3 (Yemen Standard Time)

Zinjibar (Arabic: زِنْجِبَار Zinjibār) is a port and coastal town in south-central Yemen, the capital of Zinjibar District and the Abyan Governorate. It is located next to the Wadi Bana in the Abyan Delta. From 1962 to 1967, it was the administrative capital of the Fadhli Sultanate, although the royal residence remained at the former capital of Shuqrah. At the time of the 2004 census, Zinjibar's population numbered 19,879 inhabitants. The town supports a small seaside resort and fishing industry. Cotton (Gossypium barbadense) grown in the area is brokered in the market.

== History ==
Zinjibar was a long-established trading center for commerce with the Far East. However, in 1163 (559 AH) the town was burned and destroyed by Abdel Nabi Ali Mahdi Yoosuf. It was rebuilt as is evidenced by 15th century Yemeni pottery at the Mazda (القريات) archaeological site, but was destroyed again in tribal warfare. In the 19th century, Fadhli Sultan Hussein bin Ahmed bin Abdullah re-established the town, also was exiled to Pune India and in the early 1920s was ordered to be returned, Sultan Saleh Abdullah bin Hussein bin Ahmed was exiled by the British to Zinzibar thous upon his return he renamed the town Zinjibar in honor of his exile.

The name Zinjibar is from Persian compound Zang-bâr (زنگبار), meaning "coast of the dark-skinned". The name Zanzibar is also of the same root.

During the later stages of the Aden Emergency, Zinjibar and neighbouring areas were seized by the National Liberation Front in early September 1967. Rebels and their supporters later paraded through the city in celebration of the capture. Qahtan al-Shaabi, the leader of the group, held a news conference at the local city hall, where he iterated the Front's opposition to the British-backed sultans and vowed to continue their resistance to against the occupation.

=== 2011 revolt ===
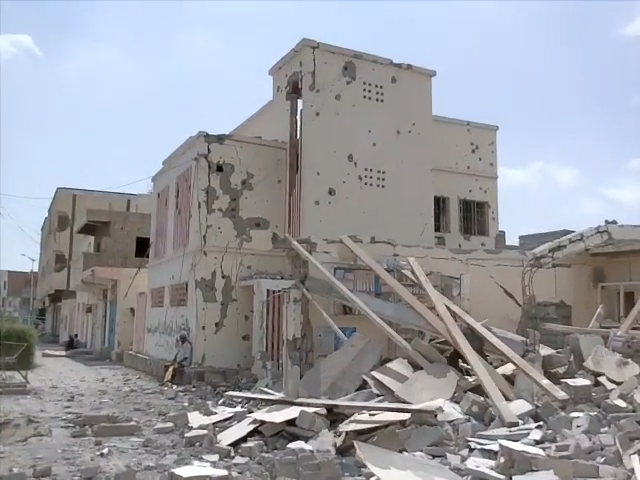
A destroyed building in Zinjibar, 2012

In May 2011, the town was reported as overtaken by Islamist militants as part of the 2011 Yemeni uprising. On June 12, 2012, the militants were driven out by the Yemeni army. On the same date, the neighboring town of Jaʿār, 15 kilometers or 9 miles to the north, was also retaken by the government forces.

=== 2015 conflict ===
Soldiers allied with the Houthis took over Zinjibar in late March 2015, driving out troops and fighters loyal to President Abd Rabbuh Mansur Hadi. The city became a target for the airstrikes of a multinational coalition intervening in Yemen on Hadi's behalf. On 2 December 2015, Ansar al-Sharia captured Zinjibar, along with Jaʿār.

=== 2016 conflict ===
In early May 2016, AQAP fighters withdrew from the city of Zinjibar and Jaar after negotiation with Hadi loyalists. Since then, it has repeatedly withdrawn and returned. On 14 August, the cities were fully captured by pro-government forces which dislodged the militants from them.

== Economy ==
Prior to the conflict, the main economic sectors in Zinjibar were the fishing and agricultural industries. Other sectors included artisanal works, the public sector and construction, and the port and shipping industries. With the wide stretches of farmland surrounding it, the city was once known as the "food basket of Yemen" due to producing a wide range of fruits and vegetables, including bananas, cantaloupes, mangoes, and numerous citrus fruits, much of which was sold in Aden to constitute 4.4 percent of Yemen's annual agricultural production. Cash crops, such as sesame corn and cotton, were also grown upon the completion of a staple crop. However, these sectors were devasted by the destruction of farmlands and irrigation systems through conflict, irreparable damage to the local port, and the Saudi-imposed blockade on Yemen's coasts.
