= Battle of Radda =

Armed confrontation in Yemen

Battle of Radda (2012)
- Part of the al-Qaeda insurgency in Yemen and the Yemeni crisis
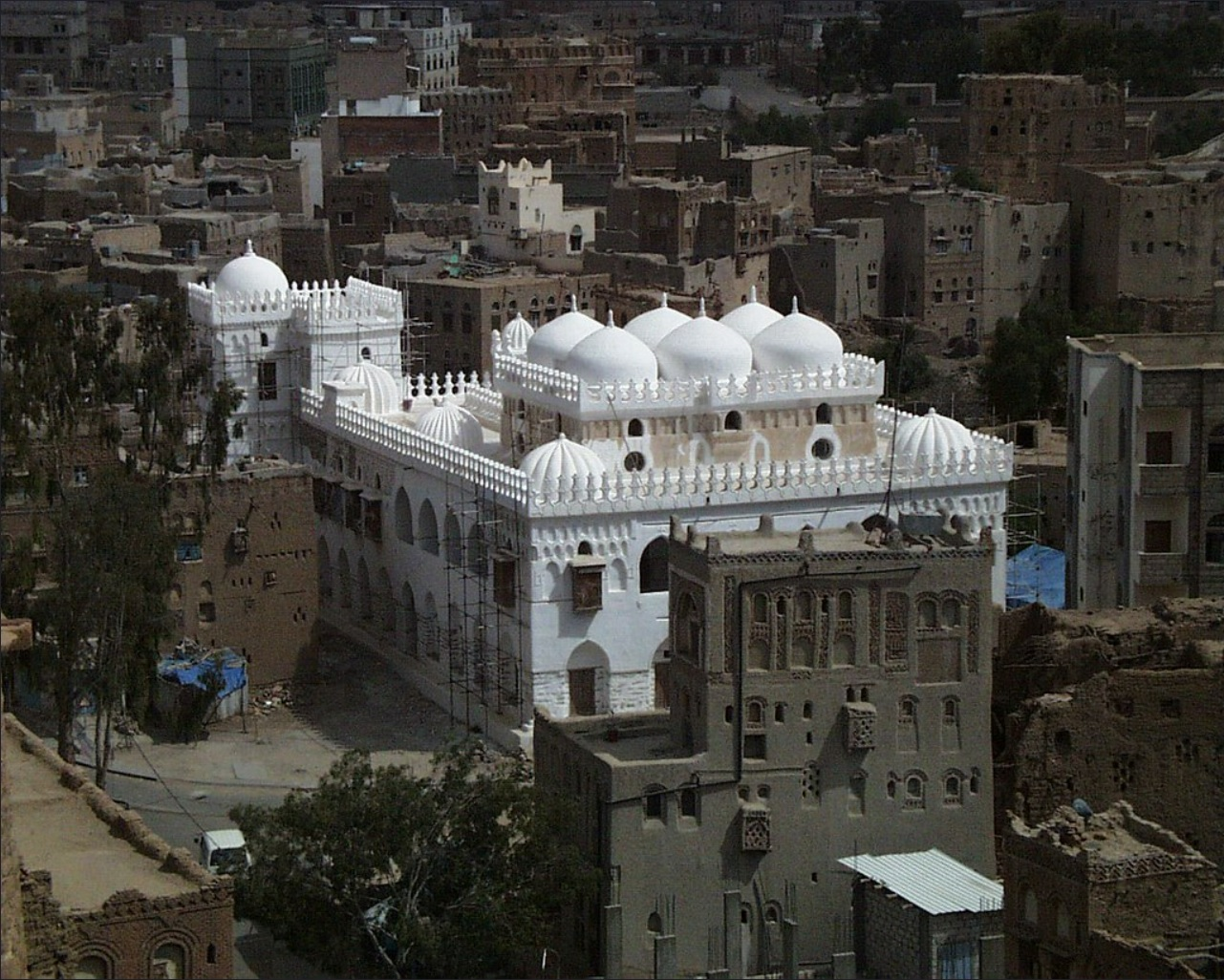
- The Amiriya Madrasa in Radda, which was occupied by Ansar al-Sharia during the battle
Date	14–24 January 2012 (1 week and 3 days)
Location	Radda, al-Bayda Governorate, Yemen 14°20′24″N 44°54′31.5″E
Result	Tribal victory: Ansar al-Sharia withdraws from Radda; Yemeni government releases 15 imprisoned militants, including Nabil al-Dahab

Belligerents
Al-Qaeda in the Arabian Peninsula; Ansar al-Sharia	Popular Committees; Local police

Commanders and leaders
Tariq al-Dhahab	Majid al-Dhahab

Units involved
Military of al-Qaeda in the Arabian Peninsula	Local tribes; Qayfa; Hattaimah; Riyashi; Sarhan

Casualties and losses
One killed, three wounded	Two policemen killed Two tribesmen killed, two wounded
- Five unspecified combatants killed and eight wounded

Beginning on 14 January, 2012, fighters from Ansar al-Sharia invaded and occupied several buildings in Radda, a city in the al-Bayda Governorate of Yemen. Led by Islamist tribesman Tariq al-Dhahab, the militants first entered and occupied ancient Amiriya Madrassa and Citadel of Radda before receiving hundreds of reinforcements and sweeping through other areas of the city on 16 January, including the local police station, security headquarters, and central prison. Dhahab declared an Islamic emirate in the city with him as its emir.

Security forces were criticized for not intervening during the invasion. Several tribes across the al-Bayda region convened to administer a multi-faceted approach to counter the militants and end the conflict. A team of tribal negotiators was set up to mediate a withdrawal of Ansar al-Sharia, meanwhile tribesmen from several tribes in the area reinforced the locals by forming Popular Committees on 18 January. The tribesmen besieged the militants in the Madrassa and Citadel to prevent them from encroaching on the city further, eventually leading to deadly clashes between them on 20 and 21 January.

On 24 January, an agreement was reached between the negotiators and Ansar al-Sharia which saw their withdrawal to al-Manasseh, the home village of Dhahab. In exchange for their disengagement, the Yemeni government released 15 militants requested by Dhahab, including his brother Nabil, and a council was established to govern the town under Islamic law. Dhahab was later killed in al-Manasseh by his brother, Hizam.

== Background ==
Tariq al-Dhahab's turn to militancy began in 2007, when he alongside many of his brothers were forced out of their home in the Qayfa region of al-Bayda after another faction of brothers claimed leadership of the tribe and seized their inheritance. While in exile, Dhahab joined al-Qaeda in the Arabian Peninsula's local front, Ansar al-Sharia, eventually becoming a commander in the group through a reputation for resolving tribal disputes, often through blood money supplied to him by AQAP. He gained further notoriety after his sister married jihadist cleric Anwar al-Awlaki.

Despite the leadership of the Qayfa tribe being passed down in late 2010 to Majid al-Dhahab, Tariq's nephew, by that time Tariq had already established a pronounced role in the tribe, allowing him to further entrench AQAP into it. Ansar al-Sharia had been sporadically active in Radda throughout 2011 but did not hold any territory. AQAP wished to utilize Tariq's tribal standings in order to entrench itself into the region.

== Battle ==
=== Capture ===
On 14 January, a force of 20 militants, including their leader Tariq al-Dhahab, entered the Amiriya Madrassa in Radda during the afternoon. There, the group recited prayers at the compound's mosque and gave a lecture to the attendants. Yahya al-Nusairi, a local architecture official who was present, demanded the militants not cause any damage to the mosque or the city, to which Dhahab complied. The militants then left the mosque to take control of the ancient Citadel of Radda, along with three strategic mountaintops and a checkpoint at the northern entrance to the city. By 15 January, the fighters had hung their flag at both the Citadel and the Madrassa, and publicly pledged allegiance to al-Qaeda leader Ayman al-Zawahiri while leading the evening prayers. Local tribesmen began taking positions across the city and occupying government buildings on its perimeter in order to prevent Ansar al-Sharia's further expansion.

From their previously established positions at the Citadel and Madrassa, about 200 Ansar al-Sharia fighters moved in on several neighbourhoods in the city, completing their maneuver by the morning of 16 January. The fighters besieged government buildings and stormed the city's police station, security headquarters, and central prison, where they killed two police guards and let loose hundreds of convicts. The militants then took up positions around the city's perimeter to prevent people from entering or fleeing. Midday clashes in a central market left two tribesmen dead and two wounded, as well as one militant dead and three wounded. The militants were met by almost no resistance during their capture of the city by the local security forces. Dhahab was now declared by the militants to be the emir of Radda.

=== Standoff and clashes ===
On 17 January, Yemeni security forces surrounded the entrances to the city, but avoided mounting an offensive due to fear of damaging the occupied buildings. The decision to launch an invasion was given to a security committee. A meeting was held between officials and tribal sheikhs from al-Bayda, during which the tribes gave the army a 48-hour ultimatum to resecure Radda, or else they would resolve the situation independently. The local commander of the Republican Guard denied accusations of inaction and pledged to send more soldiers to the frontlines.

On 18 January, it was announced that the tribes from Radda and its seven surrounding districts had formed Popular Committees to prevent a complete takeover of the city after a meeting between them and security officials. Fighters from the Qayfa, Hattaimah, and Sarhan tribes were deployed to guard government buildings and security installations, while a siege was administered against Ansar al-Sharia's captured positions. Simultaneously, a team of several tribal negotiators from Radda and Dhamar Governorate was established to communicate with the militants. Tribal sheikhs issued a 24-hour ultimatum for Ansar al-Sharia to withdraw from the city. Dhahab, who had released a video announcing a caliphate, publicly demanded the release of 400 imprisoned militants, among them his brother, Nabil. According to a mediator, Dhahab had told them that Ansar al-Sharia would not withdraw until a council was set up to govern Radda in accordance with Islamic law, and until 15 militants were released by the government.

On 19 January, Ansar al-Sharia attempted to secure the southern portion of Radda, connecting it to the neighbouring Juban district in Dhale Governorate. Standoffs with Riyashi tribesmen forced them to retreat back to al-Midan neighbourhood, where the Citadel and Madrassa were located. Dhahab announced his intention to form a local council to govern the city in order to reduce corruption and to implement Islamic law. Multiple rounds of negotiations were held for the withdrawal of the militants but ultimately failed. Tariq's half-brother, Hizam al-Dhahab, attempted to convince him to withdraw as he risked his reputation within the Qayfa tribe, but was rejected.

Tensions between the militants and the tribes reached a breaking point by 20 January. On that day, Ansar al-Sharia forces attempted to move into Haziz neighborhood, leading to clashes with tribesmen which forced the militants to retreat to their positions in al-Midan. On 21 January, Dhahab ordered local witch doctor Mohammed al-Awbali to turn himself in. Clashes broke out between tribesmen and Ansar al-Sharia as they attempted to arrest him at his residence in Haziz, though he wasn't present at the time. Also during the day, a tribal delegation led by sheikh's Ibrahim al-Jabri, Hashed al-Qawsi, and Fadl al-Maqdashi had arrived in Radda to negotiate with Dhahab. Jabri told Dhahab to leave the city in order to avoid further violence, while Qawsi and Maqdashi offered themselves as hostages were unable to reach him. Five people were killed and eight were wounded altogether during the two days of clashes.

=== Mediation and withdrawal ===
On 22 January, Hizam along with Majid al-Dhahab, sheikh of the Qayfa tribe and nephew of Tariq, publicly denounced him and Ansar al-Sharia during a tribal meeting, and voiced his support for the local's in their attempt to remove the militants. On 23 January, Yemeni Army began preparations to mount an offensive, with at least 15 tanks and 20 armoured vehicles being sent as reinforcements to back the capture of a military base on the western side of the town. Simultaneously, mediations officially began between the tribes and Ansar al-Sharia. Negotiations were conducted through three waves, the first consisting of prominent tribal leaders from across al-Bayda, the second being Jabri and other mediators, and the third led by Ahmed Ali Kalaz, Yemen's former ambassador to the United Nations and to Cuba. Dhahab reiterated his previously announced demands to the mediators; the release of 15 militants including Nabil, the establishment of a council to govern the town and reduce corruption, and the implementation of Sharia. The negotiators stated that the militants had to leave peacefully or else they would be removed through force, and pointed out that the legal system of Yemen was already rooted in Islam.

A final round of mediations was held between Jabri, Qawsi, Maqdashi, and Dhahab at the Madrassa. There, the final terms of the agreement were settled on, including the release of Nabil and the other militants and the formation of a council to administer the city and replace the previous officials, consisting of five tribal dignitaries from the seven districts of the historical Radda region. Late in the day, Kalaz stated that Dhahab was given the sons of two senior tribesmen as a guarantee for the deal to proceed.

On 24 January, Dhahab and Ansar al-Sharia withdrew from Radda to al-Manasseh, a rural village approximately 30 kilometres away where the Dhahab family hails from. Five of the 15 prisoners, including Nabil, were released from Central Security Organization prisons during the day, while the rest were scheduled to be released in the following two days. Ansar al-Sharia released a statement confirming their withdrawal as part of the agreement. Local residents of Radda came out in celebration as security forces re-entered the city and shops began to reopen.

== Aftermath ==
The withdrawal to al-Manasseh only continued the internal conflict within the Dhahab family. Having grown tired of seeing Ansar al-Sharia members around the village, Hizam confronted Tariq after evening prayers on 16 February 2012, demanding that he and the militants leave al-Manasseh. An argument proceeded to break out, eventually resulting in Hizam shooting and killing Tariq on the spot. Hizam fled the scene with his supporters to his own residence, where a battle broke out later in the day between them and Ansar al-Sharia fighters led by another one of his brothers, Qaed. At least 16 people were killed during the clashes, including Hizam after his house was car-bombed.

== See also ==
- Battle of Jaar (2011)
- Battle of Lawdar (2012)
- Battle of Zinjibar (2011–2012)
