= Jalal Baleedi =

Yemeni Islamist leader

- جلال بلعيدي
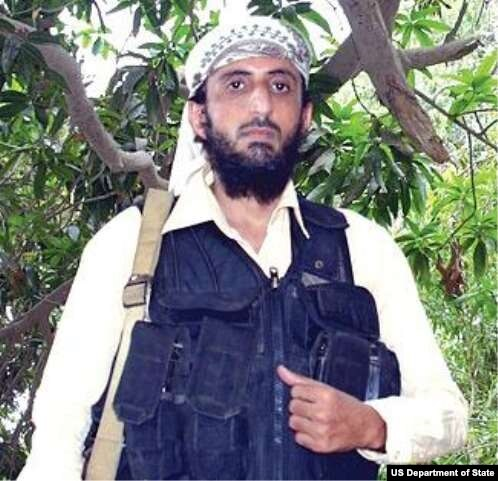
- Baleedi in 2012

Emir of Ansar al-Sharia
- In office 2011 – 3 February 2016
- Appointed by: Nasir al-Wuhayshi
- Preceded by: Position established
- Succeeded by: Unknown

Personal details
- Born: 1981 or 1982 Al-Sawad, Abyan Governorate, Yemen
- Died: February 3, 2016 Marqasha, Abyan Governorate, Yemen
- Cause of death: Drone strike
- Nickname: Abu Hamza al-Zinjibari

Military service
- Allegiance: Al-Qaeda in the Arabian Peninsula
- Years of service: 2011–2016
- Rank: Emir of Ansar al-Sharia
- Commands: Field commander for several governorates
- Battles/wars: Al-Qaeda insurgency in Yemen; Battle of Jaar (2011); Battle of Zinjibar (2011–2012); Battle of Dofas; Battle of Lawdar (2012); Yemeni civil war (2014–present) X; Fall of Zinjibar and Jaar (2015)

Jalal Mohsen Saleh Baleedi al-Marqashi (Note: Arabic: جلال محسن صالح بلعيدي المرقشي) (1981 or 1982 – 3 February 2016), (Note: The Jamestown Foundation described him as being 30 years old as of 2012.) also known by his nom de guerre Abu Hamza al-Zinjibari, (Note: Arabic: أبو حمزة الزنجباري) was an Islamist militant commander who led the Yemeni group Ansar al-Sharia from its emergence in 2011 until his death in 2016. A native of Abyan, Baleedi was appointed to lead the group by al-Qaeda in the Arabian Peninsula (AQAP), which created Ansar al-Sharia as a rebranding effort to attract popular support locally.

As the leader of the group, Baleedi led the capture of several towns in southern Yemen during the Yemeni revolution and their administration under Islamic law. He exhibited a populist leadership style, engaging with residents of towns branded by Ansar al-Sharia as Islamic emirates. He commanded Ansar al-Sharia forces during the Battle of Zinjibar, and was involved in planning a successful raid in which hundreds of soldiers died. Baleedi and the rest of Ansar al-Sharia fled most of Abyan and Shabwah after an army offensive in 2012, and established themselves in Abyan's al-Mahfad district until another offensive in 2014, which saw him relocate to Hadhramaut.

Baleedi was "known for his brutality", most prominently displayed when he commanded his fighters to publicly behead a group of unarmed Yemeni soldiers in August 2014. Considering him a top leader of AQAP and a premier field commander in multiple governorates, the United States had offered a $5 million bounty for information on Baleedi by 2014. During the Yemeni civil war, Baleedi openly detailed AQAP and Ansar al-Sharia's support for and cooperation with anti-Houthi forces, some affiliated with the government. He led Ansar al-Sharia's recapture of Zinjibar and Jaar at the end of 2015. He was killed by a US drone strike on 3 February 2016.

== Early life ==
Little is known about Baleedi's early life. What is known is that he was born and raised in al-Sawad, a village in al Wade'a district, Abyan. His father was a brigadier general in the Yemeni military. A local resident said that Baleedi received education in al-Sawad and worked at a bakery in the provincial capital of Zinjibar, adding that he was "a good man and helpful with the people." An avid enjoyer of football, he played as a goalkeeper for the local Hassan Sports Club from 2000 to 2001. After briefly being unemployed upon graduating from school, he worked as an imam at a mosque in Zinjibar until 2011.

== Ansar al-Sharia ==
In early 2011, Baleedi was appointed the emir (leader) of Ansar al-Sharia, a newly established Islamist militant group. Ansar al-Sharia is heavily linked to al-Qaeda in the Arabian Peninsula (AQAP), and is believed to be an affiliate or direct extension of the group. The group was first publicly mentioned in April 2011 by AQAP's senior cleric Adel al-Abab, who described it as a local rebranding of AQAP to attract more support among Yemenis. Baleedi himself was vague on the relationship between the groups, and stated that his role is "an assignment, not an honor".

Baleedi's membership in AQAP was likely influenced by the fact that some of his family members were affiliated with the group. Some reports have claimed that Baleedi received the position in part due to having "direct connections" with the leader of AQAP, Nasir al-Wuhayshi. His membership in the al-Marqisha tribe, one of the largest in Abyan, may have also influenced AQAP in granting him the position in order to further appeal to locals, as was his residency in Zinjibar, for which he adopted the nom de guerre "Zinjibari".

By 2014, Baleedi was reported to have become AQAP's premier field commander in Abyan, Shabwah, Lahij, Hadhramaut, and al-Bayda governorates, all in which AQAP uses the Ansar al-Sharia brand. BBC News identified Baleedi as AQAP's "combat operations chief".

=== Leadership style ===
Baleedi's leadership was consistent with Abab's claim that AQAP was moving towards a more populist presentation locally. Madad News Agency, the media wing of Ansar al-Sharia, commonly featured Baleedi in its releases, in which he referred to the people of Abyan as his brothers. In one video, he is seen socializing among residents in captured town of Jaar. He also possesses effective public speaking skills. A Yemeni journalist described him as having "a sense of humor and a big smile that doesn't leave him and he has the ability to gain the sympathy of others. He carefully observes and is quick-witted (sic) but on the other hand, he has superficial thinking and very much sticks to his opinion despite [his efforts at] showing respect for others opinions. Also he does not hesitate to accuse of treason [those] against him". Another wrote that he "has a great ability to convince others of his beliefs. He is eloquent and is able to express his ideas. He is popular among people in southern Yemeni governorates such as Abyan, Hadramout, Shabwa, and Lahj".

=== Abyan and Shabwah emirates ===
Ansar al-Sharia captured at least five towns in the southern Abyan and Shabwah governorates during the Yemeni revolution, and administered them as Islamic emirates. Baleedi stated that his group supported the revolution but differed with the opposition in their demands for democracy, claiming that it was incompatible with Sharia. He denied claims that Ansar al-Sharia had worked with former President Ali Abdullah Saleh or other elements of his regime to undermine the revolution.

Baleedi was AQAP's field commander in Zinjibar during this period. He was present during Ansar al-Sharia's capture of Zinjibar on 27 May 2011, and gave a speech at a mosque that day declaring that his group was soon intending to seize Aden. Intense fighting took place for the rest of the year as the army attempted to regain the city, leaving it mostly destroyed and depopulated. On 13 January 2012, Ansar al-Sharia permitted a group of more than 2,000 displaced residents to return to the city for a visit. Before a dinner was held for the residents, Baleedi addressed them in a speech assuring their safety and the restoration of public services and justice under Sharia. He was later featured in a video shared by Ansar al-Sharia on 26 January, in which he urged the citizens of Abyan to hold demonstrations to demand the military's withdrawal from the region.

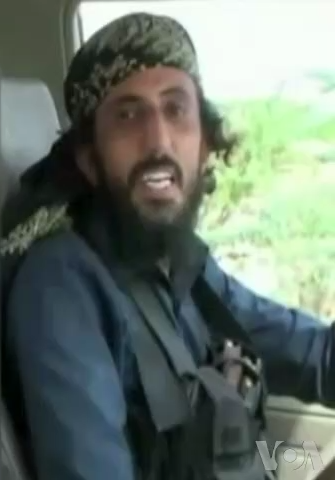
Baleedi in a looted military truck after the 2012 Dofas attack

Baleedi helped coordinate a successful attack on military installations near Zinjibar on 5 March which left 185 soldiers dead and 73 captured. He later appeared in a video listing off the equipment seized by militants during the raid. After being allowed to see the captured soldiers held in Jaar, journalist Ghaith Abdul-Ahad was addressed while blindfolded by Baleedi, who threatened to have the prisoners executed if the government did not agree to conducting negotiations soon. A week after, negotiations proceeded. The soldiers were released on 29 April after a ceremony in which Baleedi gave a speech to a crowd of civilians.

The Yemen Times conducted an interview with Baleedi on 4 May. The interview centered on the then-ongoing battle of Lawdar, and the inability of Ansar al-Sharia to capture the town as it did others in Abyan. Baleedi claimed that Ansar al-Sharia invaded Lawdar in order to protect it from abuses committed by the military, and that the Popular Committees, networks of pro-government tribal fighters, did not represent opposition among the general populace in Abyan towards Ansar al-Sharia. He asserted that Ansar al-Sharia would continue to fight for Lawdar and Zinjibar, and denied casualty claims by the government. He also questioned the Southern Movement for fighting alongside the government, but nonetheless stated that "our battle isn't against them".

A large-scale offensive was launched by the Yemeni government on 12 May in order to recapture Abyan and Shabwah from Ansar al-Sharia. A video spread through social media on 30 May showed Baleedi present at the 7 October militant base in Jaar, with him denying reports that it along with other Ansar al-Sharia positions were retaken by the army. However, by 15 June, Abyan had been completely cleared of Ansar al-Sharia presence, with Zinjibar, Jaar, and Shuqrah having been recaptured. Most militants, including Baleedi, were believed to have fled into their native tribal areas, blending in with the locals. On 10 August 2012, Baleedi reportedly escaped from an AQAP bomb-making compound in Jaar as gunmen from the Popular Committees raided it.

=== Shift to Hadhramaut ===
Among other AQAP forces, Baleedi eventually fled to the al-Mahfad region in Abyan in the aftermath of the offensive, where they established a major training camp. After a series of attacks on local military positions, the Yemeni government launched an offensive in the region in April 2014, capturing the al-Mahfad camp and forcing the militants to retreat to Hadhramaut, where Baleedi was AQAP's provincial commander. On 26 May, a statement attributed to Baleedi surfaced on jihadist forums in which he condemned the offensive.

Baleedi and his forces were able to move freely throughout the mountainous areas of Abyan and Shabwah, as well as the al-Qatn and Seiyun districts of Hadhramaut. A soldier posted in al-Mahfad district said in August, "Baleedi has great fame and inspires a lot of fear when we hear about his movements in al-Mahfad, which makes us always afraid when we leave the camp. We have heard that he is a ruthless man with clever ideas and plans which target soldiers."

Baleedi led an intensified insurgency in Hadhramaut after AQAP and Ansar al-Sharia withdrew from Abyan and Shabwah. On 23 May, Ansar al-Sharia attempted to seize some areas of the city of Seiyun. Before they fled from an army response, Baleedi was photographed with other militants in front of the local museum. Another city in Hadhramaut, al-Qatn, was later attacked and taken over by Ansar al-Sharia on the morning of 7 August, with AQAP leaders Baleedi and Harith al-Nadhari touring the city and meeting residents before the militants withdrew at by afternoon with army reinforcements arriving.

Baleedi was believed to have masterminded an attack on 8 August in which a group of 14 unarmed soldiers were forced out of a bus and executed in Shibam. A video circulated on Youtube showed Baleedi commanding the group of militants responsible for the attack. Baleedi's order to have the soldiers executed by public beheading, an act unprecedented in Yemen's insurgency thus far, were likely inspired by the Islamic State's activities in Iraq and Syria at the time. The attack was met with outrage and condemnation in Yemen, including from Baleedi's own father. Journalist Abdulrazaq al-Jamal, who had connections to AQAP and had previously interviewed Baleedi, said that "the high-ranking leaders of Ansar Al-Sharia are not happy with the latest major attack in Hadramout and this means the popularity of Baleedi will decrease among Ansar Al-Sharia and ordinary citizens."

In October 2014, the United States Department of State included Baleedi in its Rewards for Justice Program, naming him as among the most wanted leaders of AQAP. The listing described Baleedi as a "regional emir who was involved in 2013 with planning bomb attacks on various Western diplomatic facilities and personnel," and offered up to $5 million for information leading to the uncovering of his whereabouts.

=== Yemeni civil war ===
An AQAP-linked Twitter account posted an interview of Baleedi on 12 November 2014, in which he spoke on the group's progress in recent clashes with the Houthis in Radaa amidst the Yemeni civil war. Baleedi claimed that the US was supporting the Houthis in their takeover in Yemen and had provided them air support, citing a drone strike on AQAP fighters in the al-Manasseh on 24 October which led to the Houthis seizing the area. He also notes the several AQAP leaders who were killed by drone strikes in Radda amid fighting with the Houthis. He also praised Sunni tribes resisting the Houthis, encouraging others to do the same.

Baleedi appeared in another interview in August 2015, in which he stated that AQAP was supplying money and weapons to anti-Houthi groups, and had converted Mukalla, the provincial capital of Hadhramaut which AQAP took over in April, had been converted "into a safe haven for war casualties and displaced people." Regarding the arrival of Saudi-led coalition forces in Abyan who reinforced anti-Houthi factions, which included AQAP, to fight off a Houthi offensive, Baleedi stated that AQAP was displeased with their presence and claimed that they had impeded their progress in Abyan. Baleedi later led Ansar al-Sharia's capture of Zinjibar and Jaar from pro-government tribal forces on 2 December. Later in December, AQAP released a video celebrating their return to Jaar in which Baleedi was seen congratulating his fighters. He was one of the few militants seen not wearing a face covering.

==== Alleged defection to Islamic State ====
At the time of his death, some news agencies, such as Reuters, wrote that Baleedi had recently defected from AQAP and Ansar al-Sharia to become the leader of the Islamic State – Yemen Province (IS–Y). One report claimed that he defected to IS–Y in 2015, and established a training camp for the group near the border to Saudi Arabia. Despite al-Qaeda's hostility towards IS, Baleedi reportedly was "ideologically closer" to the latter according to the Associated Press, and was a supporter of the group according to The Hill. FDD's Long War Journal expressed skepticism at the claims of Baleedi's defection. It cited the fact that IS–Y had been undergoing a leadership crisis at the time, so that if Baleedi did defect, the group would have immediately taken the opportunity to announce it due to his status in AQAP. It also noted that Baleedi was featured in AQAP media leading the group's fighters by as late as December 2015.

== Death ==
On 3 February 2016, Baleedi, along with two other militants described as his guards, were killed by an overnight US drone strike as they were travelling in a vehicle through the Marqasha tribal area of Abyan. AQAP released a statement days later confirming his death, stating that he was "killed in a Crusader strike that targeted him while he was amongst the sons of his tribe in Abyan." Baleedi's death was the first suffered by AQAP leadership in 2016.

Baleedi's brother, Tawfiq Baleedi, was reportedly appointed by AQAP as the new emir of Zinjibar by 6 February. An internal power struggle proceeded to emerge between two AQAP factions in Zinjibar, one of which regarded Baleedi's brother as the local emir, while the other supported another local commander, Abu Anas Al-Sanani, for the position. On 8 February, clashes broke out in Zinjibar between the two sides, with at least seven militants being killed and another nine being wounded.
