= Southern Abyan Offensive (2016) =

Part of the Yemeni Civil War

- Part of the al-Qaeda insurgency in Yemen and South Yemen insurgency
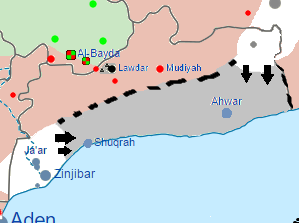
- The territory that AQAP seized during the offensive showed in dark grey, surrounded by black lines.
Date	2–20 February 2016 (18 days)
Location	Shuqrah and Ahwar, Abyan Governorate Yemen
Result	AQAP victory: AQAP united its western and eastern parts of its Emirate

Belligerents
Islamic Emirate of Yemen: AQAP	Yemen: People's Committees; Popular resistance

Commanders and leaders
Abu Hamza al-Zinjibari †; Tawfiq Belaidi	(Yemen) Sheikh Mazen al-Aqrabi † (Popular resistance unit senior commander)

Units involved
Unknown	Unknown

Strength
Unknown	Unknown

Casualties and losses
Unknown	3 killed 38–40 captured 17–20 executed

The Southern Abyan Offensive refers to a 2016 offensive in Yemen that al-Qaeda in the Arabian Peninsula (AQAP) launched in late February, which ended with a victory for AQAP as Yemeni tribal fighters loyal to president Abdrabbuh Mansour Hadi were driven out of Abyan Governorate.

== Offensive ==
Al-Qaeda in the Arabian Peninsula was beginning to take parts of other remaining areas of southern Abyan Governorate from the beginning of February 2016, when they entered Ahwar and other towns. During the fight for Awhar, 3 AQAP fighters were killed by Southern Movement fighters in a fight in a checkpoint. The major offensive began in the dawn of 20 February, with the AQAP first taking Ahwar, then Shuqrah, in one day fighting, that resulted to the death of three Hadi government loyalists. Also on the same day, AQAP attacked the new base of the Hadi government in the port city of Aden, killing one tribal leader and one of his bodyguards. After the tribal fighters abandoned the southern Abyan, and headed for the north, AQAP set up their flags in the government building, establishing a sharia court, and an Emirate, that is led by Tawfiq Belaidi, the brother of Jalal Baleedi (also named Abu Hamza al-Zinjibari), who was killed in a U.S. drone strike on 3 February.

Southern Abyan is located in a region with a massive strategic importance for the AQAP because of its geographical connection with the coastal city of Mukalla, the headquarters of AQAP. Mukalla was seized by the AQAP in the summer of 2015, the first major victory of AQAP since the beginning of the war.

== Aftermath ==
On 8 April 2016, more than 35 Hadi Yemeni government soldiers were captured by AQAP soldiers in Ahwar. 17 or more than 20 of them were executed by firing squad, with the others being wounded but still alive, and with others believed to have escaped and get to safety out of Ahwar. The soldiers were travelling from Aden to Al Mahrah Governorate via Ahwar, and during hair passing in Ahwar they have been ambushed. One day later, on 9 April, AQAP denied that its fighters executed the soldiers, blaming a local armed fighter named Ali Aqeel. "We entered Ahwar around two months ago to chase this corrupt individual and his gang," the statement said.
