= Battle of Lawdar (2012) =

Armed confrontation in Yemen

- Part of the al-Qaeda insurgency in Yemen and the Yemeni crisis
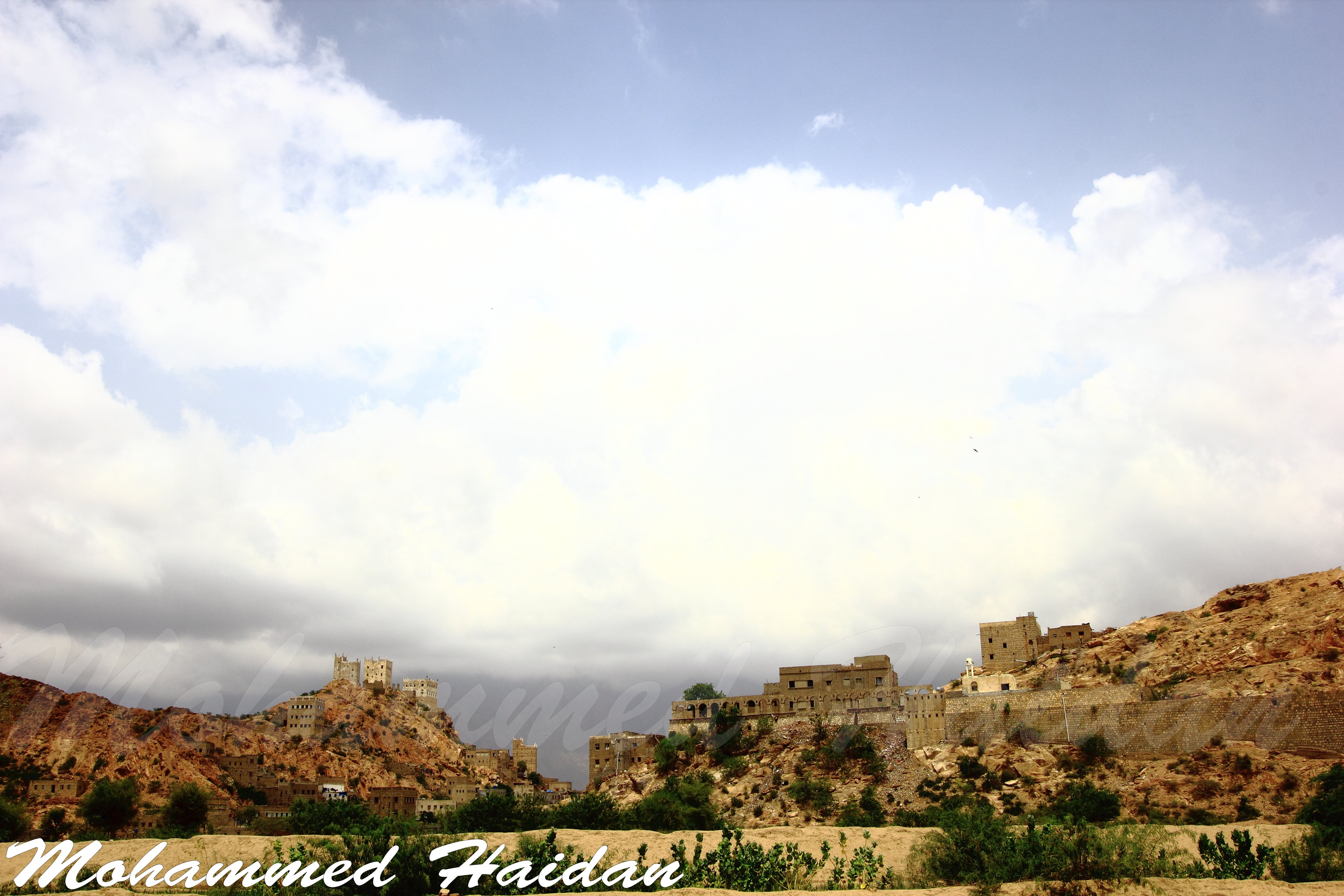
- The Zara Mountain, a strategic site overlooking Lawdar, after the battle
Date	9 April – 17 May 2012 (1 month, 1 week and 1 day)
Location	Lawdar, Abyan Governorate, Yemen 13°53′0″N 45°52′0″E
Result	Yemeni victory: Ansar al-Sharia withdraws from Lawdar, suffering heavy casualties

Belligerents
Al-Qaeda in the Arabian Peninsula	Yemen

Commanders and leaders
Jalal Baleedi; Ahmed Dararish †; Samir Salem al-Moqayda †	(Yemen) Abdulqawi Al-Masmari (Yemen) Faraj Hussein Ghalebi (Yemen) Qasim Dabwan † (Yemen) Saeed Gharama (Yemen) Nazar Jaafar (Yemen) Ali Aydah (Yemen) Madah Awal

Units involved
Ansar al-Sharia	Yemeni Armed Forces; Yemeni Land Forces; Eastern Military Region; 111th Infantry Brigade; Republican Guard; 26th Brigade; Yemeni Air Force; Ministry of Interior; Central Security Organization; Central Security Forces; Counter-Terrorism Unit; (Yemen) Popular Committees; Local residents; Audhali tribe; Mameri tribe; Diyani tribe

Strength
Per Ansar al-Sharia: 20 tanks	Per Popular Committees: 5,000 fighters

Casualties and losses
Per Yemen: 250 killed (by 20 April)	33 soldiers and 60 tribal fighters killed, 580+ wounded

The Battle of Lawdar was a major assault by Ansar al-Sharia, an Islamist group linked to al-Qaeda in the Arabian Peninsula, in an attempt to capture Lawdar, a city in Abyan Governorate. Prior to the battle, Ansar al-Sharia already had control over several cities in Abyan, including its capital, and likely sought to take over Lawdar due to its strategic significance.

The battle started on 9 April with an assault on the barracks of the 111th Infantry Brigade, in the area of the local power station. The militants initially drove off the army and seized their equipment, but were forced to retreat after fighters from the Popular Committees, local civilian groups formed to protect against the militants, intervened and reinforced the army. Later on 11 April, Ansar al-Sharia launched a three-pronged offensive to capture the city from the power station, Zara Mountain and Jebel Yasuf. The effort was quickly stalled however, as government forces re-opened a major road linking Lawdar to al-Bayda and captured the Zara mountain and village by 13 April. Clashes continued to take place throughout the rest of the month.

On 15 May, coinciding with the launching of a military offensive across all of Abyan, government forces pushed into Jebel Yasuf and forced Ansar al-Sharia to withdraw, eventually securing the entire mountain by 16 May. The loss of Jebel Yasuf, where the militants had set up significant strongholds, eventually resulted in them retreating from the power station area, which had seen the heaviest fighting of the battle. By the next day, government officials confirmed that Ansar al-Sharia had completely fled Lawdar.

== Background ==
Ansar al-Sharia, the local front for al-Qaeda in the Arabian Peninsula (AQAP), began capturing several cities in Abyan during 2011 amid the turmoil of the Yemeni revolution. The revolution eventually concluded in February 2012 with the ousting of President Ali Abdullah Saleh and the induction of his replacement, Abdrabbuh Mansur Hadi, who pledged to continue the fight against al-Qaeda. This produced a response from Ansar al-Sharia in the form of increased attacks against security forces, including one in March which killed 185 soldiers.

Lawdar possesses a strategically significant location for AQAP, residing at a crossroads between Shabwah, al-Bayda and Lahij governorates, all of which the militant group is active in. AQAP had previously taken control of Lawdar in August 2010, sparking a brief battle which resulted in their expulsion by army forces. Ansar al-Sharia held several positions in Abyan in proximity to Lawdar, including the provincial capital of Zinjibar, which was approximately 150 kilometers away. In response to Zinjibar's capture in May 2011, the locals of Lawdar formed Popular Committees to protect against the threat from Ansar al-Sharia.

== Battle ==
=== April ===
==== 9 April ====
The battle began at dawn on 9 April, when Ansar al-Sharia forces launched an assault on the barracks of the 111th Infantry Brigade at the outskirts of Lawdar near the local power station. The attack was reportedly timed during a period of bad weather. The militants seized army equipment including tanks, anti-aircraft guns, artillery and missile launchers, which they would use to attempt to push into the town itself. Before they could however, the militants were met by an intense, hours-long combat against local Popular Committee forces, who took up the main line of defense after the army had withdrew from the frontlines. During the battle, Yemeni warplanes bombed a military checkpoint held by the militants, killing five of them. Additional army reinforcements were eventually sent to the battle, leading to the militants withdrawing from the area by the afternoon. Occasional artillery shelling and gunfire was heard throughout the rest of the day, as Popular Committee fighters began setting up checkpoints across the city. According to an Agence France-Presse tally that was verified by "tribal sources", a total of 94 people died during the day, including 74 militants, 14 soldiers and six tribal fighters.

==== 10 April ====
Reeling from the defense enacted by army and tribal forces the day before, Ansar al-Sharia forces withdrew from the city to al-Ayn, an area encompassing the southeast entrance to Lawdar. The Yemeni Air Force launched bombing runs on two Ansar al-Sharia sites on Lawdar's outskirts, destroying a tank seized the day before. The army conducted artillery shelling on Ansar al-Sharia hideouts to prevent them from sending reinforcements, although locals in Jaar reported militant pickup trucks departing to Lawdar. A local official said that the militants were surrounding Lawdar with the intention to capture it, while distributing flyers to the locals stating their determination to do so. An Ansar al-Sharia tank positioned at a power station four kilometers from the city launched continuous shelling until noon, killing a child and wounding six people.

==== 11 April ====
Ansar al-Sharia resumed its offensive on Lawdar, launching mortar shelling on the southeast part of the city adjacent to al-Ayn. Three major attacks were launched by the militants, first from the power station, and then from the Zara Mountain and the Yasuf village. Several casualties occurred as Yemeni forces attempted to secure a highway outside of Ladwar and remove Ansar al-Sharia checkpoints. Popular Committee forces seized one checkpoint and destroyed two militant tanks. The Ministry of Defense later published a statement saying that all militant checkpoints had been destroyed and that the army re-opened the road, which connected Lawdar to al-Bayda governorate. Clashes at Jebel Yasuf, a nearby mountain, left 30 militants dead, while 27 other militants, including Ansar al-Sharia commander Ahmed Dararish, were killed at a southern entrance to Lawdar. At least 51 people were killed in the city during the day.

==== 12 April ====
The battle began expanding from Lawdar to the nearby city of Mudiyah, as Popular Committee forces attacked an Ansar al-Sharia convoy heading to the former. Yemeni warplanes conducted multiple bombing raids on militant positions in al-Ayn, an entrance to Lawdar on its southern outskirts. One of the airstrike hit a militant-operated tank, destroying it and killing everyone inside. Ansar al-Sharia launched mortar shelling around the city, wounding civilians and disabling the local power station, rendering the area without electricity. A Yemeni airstrike later hit a group of militants as they were at the facility. Army soldiers reportedly forced the militants to retreat from the Zara Mountain, a strategic area overlooking the city.

A week later, a post on a jihadist internet forum announced the death of Bara’a Muhammad Salim al Sudani, a Sudanese foreign fighter who was killed in battle fighting alongside Ansar al-Sharia.

==== 13 April ====
The Yemeni government announced the deployment of 200 soldiers from the elite Counter-Terrorism Unit. The Central Security Forces arrived in Lawdar during the morning, engaging in clashes west of the city, including in the Sharwan Mountain area. The clashes resulted in the deaths of 28 militants and the arrest of two senior militants, as well as Ansar al-Sharia's withdrawal the Zara village. Clashes across the city left at least 37 people dead by the end of the day, of them 31 militants, five tribesmen, and a child who was hit by mortar fire.

==== 14 April ====
On 14 April, fighting in Lawdar was minimal as Ansar al-Sharia "withdrew to positions they occupied before the fighting began, leaving behind several snipers," according to local officials. The militants repositioned themselves at Umm Sorra, an area five kilometres southwest of Lawdar.

==== 15 April ====
Ansar al-Sharia claimed responsibility for a suicide car bombing at a Popular Committee checkpoint near Lawdar at al-Hodn, killing two tribesmen. Two additional tribal fighters and six militants were killed during clashes in al-Minyasa, another area near Lawdar.

==== 17 April ====
A highway military checkpoint on a hill near Lawdar was a attacked by a suspected Ansar al-Sharia militant driving a car bomb, who killed himself along with three soldiers, while wounding another five. Ansar al-Sharia mortar fire on a military base south of Lawdar left 10 soldiers wounded.

==== 18 April ====
Airstrikes on an area near Lawdar left six militants dead, while Ansar al-Sharia mortar shelling destroyed five homes and killed two children.

==== 20 April ====
Army and tribal forces killed 14 militants in an area east of Lawdar. The government released a statement reporting 250 militant casualties in Lawdar since the fighting began.

==== 19 April ====
Army and tribal forces launched early morning attacks on Ansar al-Sharia positions on the outskirts of Lawdar. Clashes between Ansar al-Sharia and the 111th Infantry Brigade left seven militants dead, among them four Somalis, and five wounded, while six soldiers were injured.

==== 21 April ====
Clashes in the Lawdar area left one soldier dead and 10 wounded on the army's side, as well as one Ansar al-Sharia militant dead. Yemeni airstrikes hit Ansar al-Sharia positions on Jebel Yasuf and al-Minyasa, killing 13 suspected militants. An airstrike later in the day struck a militant hideout southeast of the city, killing 17. A government statement reporting the strike did not specify whether it was a Yemeni or American operation. The Ministry of Defense announced that it would be sending additional army reinforcements to Lawdar.

==== 22 April ====
Army artillery shelling near Lawdar on positions recently captured by Ansar al-Sharia killed thirteen militants, including three Somalis, and forced them to withdraw. Popular Committee tribesmen were also involved in the operation. Four militants were killed by a Yemeni airstrike.

==== 23 April ====
Yemeni airstrikes near Lawdar struck a vehicle and two Ansar al-Sharia hideouts, killing at least 15 people. Locals witnessed other militants retrieving the bodies and burying them at the village of Umm Ayn. A separate airstrike killed four other militants.

==== 26 April ====
Brigadier General Abdulqawi Al-Masmari was removed as commander of the 111th Infantry Brigade, reportedly due to accusations from the local Popular Committees that he had been aiding Ansar al-Sharia. His replacement was announced to be Faraj Hussein Ghaleb.

==== 27 April ====
Popular Committee forces conducted a nighttime ambush on Ansar al-Sharia in al-Arqub, killing five militants. Two other militants were killed in a separate encounter near Lawdar.

==== 29 April ====
Ansar al-Sharia uploaded a statement claiming that it had seized 20 tanks from the military during the battle.

==== 30 April ====
Heavy clashes on the outskirts of Lawdar left 18 militants, two tribesmen and one army colonel dead. During the clashes, militant positions in the mountains southeast of the city were hit, destroying a tank, two machine gun-equipped technicals, and ammunition supplies. The hours-long clashes ended in Ansar al-Sharia forces withdrawing further south from Lawdar towards Amiin.

=== May ===
==== 3 May ====
Popular Committee forces pushed back a late-day Ansar al-Sharia assault on the southern entrance of Lawdar, with the support of army artillery. 12 suspected militants were killed and two of their vehicles were destroyed. Two Ansar al-Sharia mortar shells wounded four civilians within the city. An airstrike during the morning left live militants dead.

==== 5 May ====
Yemeni airstrikes on Lawdar killed five militants.

==== 6 May ====
Heavy clashes took place in the city between Ansar al-Sharia and the Popular Committees, leaving 28 militants dead and forcing them to withdraw to al-Ayn, where they conducted burials. During the hours-long clashes, two Yemeni warplanes launched bombing runs on the militants. Ali Ahmed Eida, spokesperson for the local Popular Committees, denied the presence of Counter-Terrorism Unit forces in the area in contrast to the government's claims, and said that only five Central Security Forces military vehicles were present.

==== 12 May ====
Coinciding with the launch of a governorate-wide military offensive, the 111th Infantry Brigade in Lawdar mobilized for the operation as the Yemeni Air Force dropped leaflets on the city urging locals to not comply with the orders of Ansar al-Sharia to avoid being bombed.

==== 14 May ====
Army missile strikes destroyed a moving vehicle on the outskirts of Lawdar, killing six Ansar al-Sharia militants.

==== 15 May ====
Government forces launched an offensive to capture Jebel Yasuf from Ansar al-Sharia. The militants had been entrenched in the mountain for months, setting up trenches, barricades and other fortifications. The operation was being led by the 111th Infantry Brigade along with forces from the Republican Guard. Warplanes bombarded militant positions on the mountain before the army moved up to confront them. According to Saeed Gharama, leader of the Popular Committees in Lawdar, army forces "were very afraid and about to withdraw, but the fighters of the people's committees reinforced them and boosted their morale." The militants were eventually driven off the strategic mountain, scoring a major victory for government forces. Twelve militants were reported to have died during the day, along with eight tribal fighters and eight soldiers, including Colonel Qasim Dabwan of the 111th Infantry Brigade, who was shot and killed by a sniper. Popular Committees spokesperson Ali Ahmed said "We have managed to push the extremists further away from the southern and western entrances of the city."

==== 16 May ====
Beginning after dawn prayers, the army and the Popular Committees launched an operation to clear the rest of Jebel Yasuf. Under the cover of artillery fire, soldiers and tribesmen moved through and secured the Jebel Yasuf by 11:00 local time, driving away the militants. 16 militants were killed in clashes on the outskirts of Lawdar, including Ansar al-Sharia commander Samir Salem al-Moqayda, while eight soldiers and tribal fighters died.

==== 17 May ====
Ansar al-Sharia withdrew its final units in the outskirts of Lawdar. Among the areas they fled included the power station, which had been the scene of the most intense fighting of the battle. There, the bodies of a dozen executed soldiers and tribesmen as well as their severed heads were found. Later in the day, Defense Minister Mohammed Nasser Ahmed announced that Lawdar had been fully secured from Ansar al-Sharia, providing an end to the battle. Locals took to the streets to celebrate the victory.

== Impact ==
I visited Lawdar… The whole town has been geared to fight. The streets were empty, the markets were empty. But of the local villagers, every single man was carrying a gun. Every single man would go to the front, spend an hour or two fighting at the frontline and come back. There was no structure. There was no military hierarchy. [It was a] bunch of townspeople in their sarongs, in their flip-flops, old Kalashnikovs, old hunting rifles, manning a frontline behind a concrete wall and firing from there at the lines of Al Qaeda.

— Ghaith Abdul-Ahad, Frontline

The Lawdar campaign was the first major failure in Ansar al-Sharia's military campaign in the south. The militants anticipated that the fight for Lawdar would be as brief as the capture of Zinjibar the previous year, believing that the army and residents would simply surrender. However, the stiff resistance from the Popular Committees kept Ansar al-Sharia fighters from advancing anywhere beyond the outskirts of the city. The defense of Lawdar prevented Ansar al-Sharia from further expansion in Abyan, and "caused a massive disruption in their lines."

== See also ==
- Battle of Jaar (2011)
- Battle of Radda
