= Battle of Zinjibar (2011–2012) =

Military confrontation in Yemen

- Part of the al-Qaeda insurgency in Yemen and the Yemeni crisis during the revolution
- Map of army advances and frontlines during the battle
Date	27 May 2011 – 12 June 2012 (1 year, 2 weeks and 2 days)
Location	Zinjibar and surrounding areas, Abyan Governorate, Yemen 13°7′42″N 45°22′49″E
Result	Yemeni government victory
Territorial changes	Zinjibar recaptured by Yemeni government forces

Belligerents
Yemen; United States (Note: Involved through logistics support and intelligence-sharing for Yemen, and airstrikes (see foreign involvement).); Saudi Arabia (Note: Involved through logistics support for Yemen and airstrikes.)	al-Qaeda in the Arabian Peninsula

Commanders and leaders
(Yemen) Mahdi Maqula (Note: Until March 2012); (Yemen) Salem Ali Qatan (Note: After March 2012); (Yemen) Mohammed al-Somali; (Yemen) Faisal Rajab; (Yemen) Mahmoud al-Subaihi	Nasir al-Wuhayshi; Said Ali al-Shihri; Qasim al-Raymi; Jalal Baleedi

Units involved
Yemeni Armed Forces; Yemeni Land Forces; Southern Military Region; 25th Mechanized Brigade; 31st Armoured Brigade; 39th Armoured Brigade; 115th Infantry Brigade; 119th Infantry Brigade; 135th Infantry Brigade; 201st Mechanized Brigade; Republican Guard; Yemeni Air Force; Yemeni Navy; Ministry of Interior; Central Security Organization; Central Security Forces; Counter-Terrorism Unit; (Yemen) Popular Committees; Local tribesmen; United States Armed Forces; Joint Special Operations Command; Saudi Arabian Armed Forces; Royal Saudi Air Force	Ansar al-Sharia

Strength
10,000 soldiers	700–1,000 fighters (Note: As of December 2011)

Casualties and losses
500–1,000 killed; 600+ wounded (Note: As of September 2011)	600+ killed
- Hundreds of civilian casualties 90,000+ displaced
- Location within Yemen

The battle of Zinjibar was fought between Yemeni government forces and the Islamist militant group Ansar al-Sharia in and around Zinjibar, the provincial capital of Abyan governorate. As the state was preoccupied with the Yemeni revolution, the resultant security vacuum in southern Yemen was capitalized on by al-Qaeda in the Arabian Peninsula (AQAP), which used a local insurgent front in Ansar al-Sharia to seize territory for the first time.

Using the nearby town of Jaar as a staging ground, Ansar al-Sharia invaded Zinjibar on 29 May 2011 and captured it relatively unopposed. Most security forces fled except for the 25th Mechanized Brigade, which was besieged at its base near the city. Reinforcements were brought in but were met with fierce resistance and a tightened siege on the brigade. The army partnered with the local tribes to launch an offensive on 17 July, which culminated in the relieving of the 25th Mechanized Brigade and the capture of eastern Zinjibar on 10 September. Clashes continued into the next year with Ansar al-Sharia maintaining control over most of Zinjibar.

In response to renewed military pressure, Ansar al-Sharia launched two raids on army installations near Zinjibar on 5 March 2012 which killed and wounded hundreds of soldiers. The battle intensified thereon, with army forces making inroads into Zinjibar in late April. On 12 May, the government initiated a large-scale offensive to recapture all territory occupied by Ansar al-Sharia. Army forces conducted an arc-shaped advance upon Zinjibar, pushing into central territory while securing the northern and eastern neighbourhoods. By June they had encircled Zinjibar and were closing in on the city, culminating in its complete liberation on 12 June.

The seizure of Zinjibar concerned the United States, which provided support for Yemeni ground forces and launched airstrikes on militants during the battle alongside Saudi Arabia. Between 500 to 1,000 soldiers were estimated to have died in the battle along with at least 600 militants. During their occupation, Ansar al-Sharia administered Zinjibar under Sharia and provided basic services for civilians. Most of the city's near 20,000 residents fled to neighbouring governorates leading to a refugee crisis. Destruction was widespread, and both sides were accused of human rights violations by Amnesty International and Human Rights Watch.

The participation of tribal forces (officially organized into the Popular Committees) was considered crucial to the government's victory. Zinjibar's strategic position near Aden may have pushed the government to send additional forces to Zinjibar to prevent the expansion of Ansar al-Sharia's territory. In the context of the revolution, the opposition accused President Ali Abdullah Saleh of undermining military forces in Zinjibar or having intentionally let the city fall in order to display his leadership as indispensable for Yemen's security, although this has been disputed.

== Background ==
As part of the wider Arab Spring, protests in Yemen began demanding the ouster of longtime president Ali Abdullah Saleh in 2011, sparking the Yemeni revolution. The upheaval escalated after security forces fired upon a crowd of demonstrators on 18 March, killing dozens. Influential general Ali Mohsen al-Ahmar and other military officers announced their defection to the opposition afterwards. The "highly personalistic" Yemeni Armed Forces proceeded to split between factions siding with Ahmar and the revolution and those loyal to Saleh. The government's control of the southern parts of Yemen was already limited prior to the revolution and broke down further as the political conflict grew more intense, with figures from both pro and anti-regime factions drawing security units deployed in the south to areas around the capital where the crisis was centered.

Formed in 2009, al-Qaeda in the Arabian Peninsula (AQAP) was primarily concerned with organizing terrorist attacks on the United States prior to the revolution, while keeping a low profile in Yemen. The group began to shift towards an insurgency against the Yemeni government in June 2010. In August, it took over the town of Lawdar in Abyan Governorate, sparking a brief battle which ended in their withdrawal. Another round of urban combat occurred the following month in al-Hawtah, a village in Shabwah Governorate. These engagements among others allowed AQAP to amass experience in armed combat with security forces.

The southern governorates of Abyan and Shabwah had been historical AQAP hideouts for their mountainous terrain and independent tribes. Unlike other al-Qaeda affiliates, AQAP never held or administered territory in Yemen until 2011. When asking Osama bin Laden months before the start of the Arab Spring, AQAP leader Nasir al-Wuhayshi was told his group did not have enough popular support to establish an outward presence. But with the regime's preoccupation with its own survival and fractures within the military, AQAP leadership believed there to be an opportunity to gain a foothold in Yemen. With increased freedom for operations after the 18 March massacre, militant forces quickly captured the town of Jaar in Abyan on 27 March after security forces fled the area. Preoccupied with the revolution, the government paid little concern. Senior AQAP cleric Adel al-Abab said in an April interview that AQAP was controlling Jaar under the name Ansar al-Sharia and would soon target the nearby provincial capital of Zinjibar.

== Combatants ==
=== Ansar al-Sharia ===
The militants controlling Zinjibar referred to themselves as Ansar al-Sharia. (Note: Arabic: أنصار الشريعة, romanized: Supporters of Islamic Law.) Despite the nominal difference, Ansar al-Sharia was widely believed to be affiliated with or a direct extension of AQAP. A month prior to the battle, Abab identified Ansar al-Sharia as "what we use to introduce ourselves in areas where we work to tell people about our work and goals, and that we are on the path of Allah". Ansar al-Sharia declared Jalal Baleedi (Abu Hamza) as the emir of Zinjibar, but were formally led by Wuhayshi, the leader of AQAP. Said Ali al-Shihri and Qasim al-Raymi, the deputy leader and military commander of AQAP respectively, were the primary planners of the takeover of Zinjibar and other towns in the south.

Around 700 to 1,000 mitalints were estimated to be in Zinjibar by the end of 2011. Most were Yemenis from the local populace and other areas of the country, while there were also small numbers of foreign fighters from other Arab and non-Arab states. Some foreigners had joined after arriving from Aden International Airport pretending to be tourists. The militants dressed in traditional fouta robes, and many were noted for their long hair and large beards. Fighters were fitted with canvas military vests loaded with ammunition, grenades, and a copy of the Quran.

Ansar al-Sharia forces were well-equipped and possessed heavy weaponry, most of which was seized from security forces during the initial stages of the battle. This included heavy artillery, anti-aircraft weapons, tanks, and armored transports. At least two stolen T-62 tanks were operated by the militants, but their effectiveness was negligible before they were disabled by airstrikes. Other weaponry utilized by the militants included mortars, snipers, machine guns, rocket-propelled grenades, Strela anti-air launchers, machine gun technicals, and Katyusha rocket artillery. Fighters on the ground were described as being disciplined, highly organized, and having a clear strategy, operating in small cells while utilizing knowledge of the area.

=== Yemeni government ===
The seven conventional brigades that fought in Zinjibar were mostly armored or mechanized units and belonged to the Southern Military Region command of the Yemeni Land Forces. Three units were involved in most of the fighting; the 25th Mechanized Brigade, along with the 119th Infantry Brigade and 201st Mechanized Brigade. These brigades were estimated to comprise 1,000 soldiers each, though the 25th Mechanized Brigade had also been numbered at around 2,000 soldiers. Three other brigades were later deployed during August, them being the 31st Armored Brigade, 39th Armored Brigade and 115th Infantry Brigade. The 135th Infantry Brigade joined the fight in April 2012. The full strength of Yemeni forces in Zinjibar was numbered at 10,000 troops by the end stages of the battle.

Military units aligned with different sides of the revolution fought alongside each other during the battle. The 25th Mechanized Brigade, despite having connections to Ahmar, remained neutral and coordinated with units of both orientations. Meanwhile, units such as the 119th Infantry Brigade and 135th Infantry Brigade supported Ahmar and the revolution, while the 31st Armored Brigade and 201st Mechanized Brigade were loyal to Saleh.

During the months-long siege on the 25th Mechanized Brigade's base they were surviving mainly off rice and well water; journalist Jeremy Scahill, who toured the frontlines of Zinjibar with brigade personnel, described them as "thin and haggard, many with long beards and tattered uniforms or no uniforms at all." Soldiers were not required to wear body armour due to the intense heat of the region. The brigade's inexperience in guerilla warfare and shortage in equipment such as night-vision goggles and snipers, and the government's inadequate deployment of special forces in the city, hampered its ability to effectively fight the militants during 2011. Associated Press described military forces in Abyan at large as "ill-equipped, poorly trained with weak intelligence capabilities" and "riven with conflicted loyalties".

The Central Security Forces (CFS) and elite Counter-Terrorism Unit (CTU), both components of the Ministry of Interior rather than the military, were officially deployed in Zinjibar to support the army in early April 2012, though a journalist from Le Monde had written of a CTU force of 120 soldiers fighting on the frontlines since November 2011. According to a CTU officer in Abyan, the unit was directly coordinating with conventional army forces on the ground and "participates in battles but in tactical ways." The Republican Guard was also called in by June 2012.

== Battle ==
=== Ansar al-Sharia takeover (May 2011) ===
On 27 May, around 300 fighters from Ansar al-Sharia departed from Jaar and, after a travelling through a stretch of mountains, descended into Zinjibar unopposed. Attributed to an "intelligence breakdown", the surprise invasion was completed within a few hours and without any response by government forces stationed in the city. The first target of the militants was the local base of the Central Security Forces (CSF) on the eastern outskirts of the city. It was quickly abandoned by its soldiers, allowing for the militants to raid it and loot the equipment. Most of the CSF fled to the headquarters of the 25th Mechanized Brigade on the southeast edge of the city. After equipping themselves with the looted weapons, Ansar al-Sharia proceeded to besiege the base while other militants spread through the city and captured it uncontested, including the local government headquarters.All government buildings were taken over, while surrendering soldiers were reportedly executed and occupants of the main prison were released.

The commander of the 25th Mechanized Brigade, General Mohammed al-Somali, soon realized that nearly all local officials had fled the city for Aden. After receiving no response from a Republican Guard outpost, he contacted General Ahmar for help. The 119th Infantry Brigade, located west of Zinjibar, was pro-revolution and led by Ahmar ally General Faisal Rajab. Because Somali asserted to Ahmar that he remained neutral to the revolution, the 119th Infantry Brigade was not mobilized and Ansar al-Sharia was allowed to consolidate control over Zinjibar. Checkpoints were established by the militants at the three highways leading into the city. At noon, Ansar al-Sharia leader Jalal Baleedi gave a speech for Friday prayers at a mosque in the city. They later looted the central bank and encouraged civilians to take part.

The 25th Mechanized Brigade faced further pressure from Ansar al-Sharia by 30 May. On 29 May, the army began shelling Zinjibar with artillery, and on 30 May the Yemeni Air Force began launching airstrikes on the city. The period saw some of the most intense fighting during the entire battle, with the military bombing campaign indiscriminately targeting the city without warnings for civilians. Residents estimated that around 200 homes were destroyed by the air raids. Most of the city's residents had deserted the town by that time.

=== Intensified clashes and army encirclement (June–July 2011) ===
Three additional brigades were mobilized on the evening of 6 June in preparation to assault Zinjibar and relieve the 25th Mechanized Brigade. Two days earlier, two militant ambushes near the city had left nine soldiers dead. Army forces attempted to advance towards the city's entrance overnight but encountered stiff resistance. During the clashes, Ansar al-Sharia fighters attacked an army position outside of the city, leading to a gun battle lasting multiple hours which left nine soldiers and six militants dead before the post was secured. By the next day, the government claimed at least 30 militants had been killed in Zinjibar within two days. Meanwhile, the United States inaugurated its targeted airstrike campaign on the city on 3 June, killing AQAP commanders Ali Abdullah Naji al-Harithi and Ammar al-Waeli.

On 11 June, Ansar al-Sharia attempted an early morning attack on the base of the 25th Mechanized Brigade. It was repelled and led to the deaths of 18 militants and nine soldiers. Elsewhere, the brigade destroyed a weapons and ammunition warehouse held by the militants. Somali stated in an interview that the attempted raid "represented the greatest attempt by al-Qaeda to gain control of the brigade. Following this, they continued to lay ambushes, target our men with snipers, and carry out intermittent light attacks, but not on the previous scale." The 119th Infantry Brigade fought with a group of militants planting bombs along the main road to Zinjibar on 19 June, leaving 13 militants and two soldiers dead.

By 20 June, Ansar al-Sharia had dispersed its forces across three fronts in the area, one of which was besieging the 25th Mechanized Brigade in Zinjibar while another battled the 119th Infantry Brigade in the nearby area of Dofas along the Aden-Abyan road. The 119th Infantry Brigade claimed that it had made significant progress in capturing parts of Dofas amidst heavy fighting. However, days later it and the 201st Mechanized Brigade withdrew from Dofas and were pulled three kilometers from the front lines into the outskirts of Aden to set up a security cordon. According to the military, the decision was a tactical move to remain in open territory and avoid heavy casualties as it had suffered during its advance in Dofas due to the militants setting up ambushes in the forests.

Reports on the battle by late June described Ansar al-Sharia still retaining firm control of Zinjibar, and the 25th Mechanized Brigade being confined to their base and fighting the militants on the city's outskirts. The military was launching daily artillery shelling and airstrikes on the city, indiscriminately hitting both militant positions and civilians according to the residents. A local official said that 35 homes had been destroyed by the bombings in the previous two weeks alone.

After failing to gain control of the base itself earlier in the month, Ansar al-Sharia tightened their siege on the 25th Mechanized Brigade by taking control of the al-Wahda Stadium. Witnesses describe around 300 militants armed with heavy weaponry attacking the base on 29 June, leading to an intense battle. The air force was mobilized to counterattack the militants, though one airstrike had hit a nearby civilian bus. The stadium was in control of Ansar al-Sharia by the end of the day, with 25 soldiers and 11 having died during the clashes. An army officer later reported an additional 50 troops being unaccounted for. The loss of the stadium deprived the 25th Mechanized Brigade of a major outpost for storing supplies and refueling, and exposed the brigade on its southeastern flank. The New York Times wrote that the defeat at the stadium was a display of the army's struggles in retaking Zinjibar.

After capturing the stadium, the militants proceeded to surround the base of the 25th Mechanized Brigade, with gunmen situated above nearby buildings to restrict army movements. The brigade was running out of fuel and water and was in dire need of supplies and reinforcements to continue fighting. An army officer pleaded for more support in a 3 July interview with Reuters, stating that clashes were occurring daily around the vicinity of the base. Tribal figure Tariq al-Fadhli attempted to mediate between the parties but neither side showed interest.

=== Army-tribal offensive (17 July – 10 September 2011) ===
On 17 July, the Yemeni military launched an offensive in Zinjibar, with reinforcements primarily from the 119th Infantry Brigade being sent to the city along with 450 pro-government tribal fighters. Ansar al-Sharia had been losing support from the tribes of Abyan in the lead up to the offensive, with tribal gunmen having cut supply lines to the city by 13 July. Backed by heavy tank shelling and rocket attacks from naval units off the coast, the reinforcements advanced from the west to lift the siege on the 25th Mechanized Brigade, clashing with militants in the al-Khamila and Dio neighborhoods of Zinjibar. Casualties were also reported in the east as militants fought army and tribal forces attempting to enter the city. On 20 July, senior AQAP commanders Ayad al-Shabwani and Awad Mohammed Saleh al-Shabwani were killed in combat, while units from the 31st Armoured Brigade and 119th Infantry Brigade fought against a militant attack at the bridge to Zinjibar in al-Kawd. On 21 July, government forces closed off the entrances to Zinjibar. The next day, a tribal convoy intercepted a militant convoy heading to Zinjibar, killing one and capturing 10 others. By 25 July, residents reported that Ansar al-Sharia was present only in some pockets of the city and that government forces were starting to close in. An attempted attack on the 25th Mechanized Brigade base that day left 10 militants dead. On 27 July, fighting in the city left 17 militants dead, including veteran Saudi AQAP commander Ibrahim al-Najdi.

Fighting between the army and the militants intensified near the end of July as Ramadan was set to begin. A major setback in the offensive occurred as result of a friendly fire incident on 29 July, in which a Yemeni aircraft launched at least three consecutive airstrikes on a communications building captured by tribal forces during their advance east towards the city. The strikes killed 40 people, including two colonels, a lieutenant colonel, a major, and a sheik from the Nahee tribe. The incident ruined tribal morale and trust in the government, resulting in tribal forces temporarily withdrawing from the battle to reevaluate their partnership with the army as Ansar al-Sharia resolidified their control over Zinjibar. Intense fighting over 29 to 30 July left multiple tribal commanders and military officers dead, including Brigadier General Ahmad Awad Hassan al-Marmi, the army's chief of staff in Abyan. Somali told Asharq al-Awsat in an interview that reinforcements and supplies for the 25th Mechanized Brigade were yet to have arrived, as the militants had repeatedly ambushed army convoys heading to eastwards to the brigade on the road from Aden. More than 100 militants were believed to have been killed in July alone.

By August, most fighting took place at night due to sweltering heat during the day. Zinjibar was being contested by the 119th Infantry Brigade from the west and the 25th Mechanized Brigade from the east, the latter being limited to defensive clashes for most of the month as they were still under siege at their base. Fighting took place early in the month between the 119th Infantry Brigade and militants in al-Khamila with the 39th Armoured Brigade being deployed to provide artillery support from Dofas, though the unit soon had to fend off attacks against their base. Local officials reported that Predator drones had conducted air raids on 1 August targeting multiple areas in Zinjibar including al-Khamila and Amodiah neighbourhoods as well as the al-Wahda Stadium, killing 15 militants and destroying seized army equipment. The local tribes announced their rejoining of the offensive with an official confirming that tribal fighters had returned to their positions surrounding the city, some aiding the 25th Mechanized Brigade in the east. Despite the resumption in support, the Jamestown Foundation had wrote by 12 August that "only slight progress can be reported... though some progress has been made on halting reinforcements from reaching [Ansar al-Sharia]".

Heavy clashes involving the 201st Mechanized Brigade took place in Dofas in late August, with militants launching at least five attacks on government forces there from 20 to 27 August, including an attack on the 201st Mechanized Brigade base on 23 August which killed seven soldiers and an ambush on army units attempting to reach the 25th Mechanized Brigade on 27 August. From 25 August until the end of the month, fighting in the area left a reported 40 militants and 23 soldiers dead according to FDD's Long War Journal. Wuhayshi was rumoured to have been among those killed, though this was later disproved. By the end of the month, the army had secured Dofas, al-Kawd and al-Matla on Zinjibar's outskirts, as well as the road linking it to Aden.

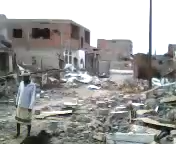
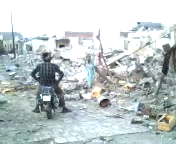
A destroyed residential area in Zinjibar, September 2011

From the start of September, advances by government forces towards the city were reported on multiple fronts. The 201st Mechanized Brigade and 119th Infantry Brigade pushed eastwards and recaptured the al-Wahda Stadium, linked up with the 25th Mechanized Brigade at their base, and secured the nearby Husn Shaddad neighbourhood. The advance came amid a barrage of US airstrikes from 31 August to 1 September which left nearly 30 militants dead and freed the 25th Mechanized Brigade's base from militant pressure. Other army units were approximately five kilometers south from Zinjibar after capturing al-Kawd. An AQAP-linked source confirmed the military was beginning to enter southern Zinjibar. Government forces had seized the main entrances to the city and were preparing to advance.

On 10 September, forces from the 119th Infantry Brigade, 201st Mechanized Brigade, and 31st Armoured Brigade, as well as allied tribesmen, launched a coordinated push into Zinjibar. The militant siege on the 25th Mechanized Brigade was lifted, while more than 2,000 soldiers moved in on and secured the eastern portion of the city, capturing several areas including the local CSF base. Facing a deluge of army reinforcements, Raymi ordered most of the militants in Zinjibar to retreat into the mountains by Jaar, leading to the army fighting "only token resistance" during their advance. Despite official statements celebrating the end of the battle and the liberation of the Zinjibar, fighting would continue to take place. Major clashes later broke out on 14 September leaving 12 militants and two civilians dead. Peace negotiations had stalled as Ansar al-Sharia rejected an offer for their total withdrawal in exchange for security forces refraining from pursuing them.

=== Continued fighting (October 2011 – February 2012) ===
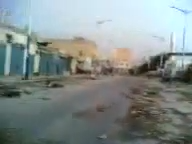
The central market of Zinjibar, October 2011

The army launched an offensive targeting the northern Bajdar neighbourhood of Zinjibar at the beginning of October. While the 201st Mechanized Brigade made several initial advances, a Yemeni aircraft mistakenly bombed a school occupied by the 119th Infantry Brigade which was followed by a militant attack. At least 30 soldiers in the school were confirmed dead by the Red Crescent, though the government denied any friendly fire. By 5 October, the army had reportedly advanced to control the eastern and central parts of Zinjibar while the militants occupied the remaining areas, including the northern areas bordering Jaar. An airstrike launched by the US the same day struck an AQAP hideout in al-Arqoub, east of Zinjibar, killing five militants. Later in the month, reports emerged of the militants forcing the 39th Armoured Brigade to withdraw to the outskirts of the city after an attack on their local outpost, regaining control of some areas in Zinjibar.

More than 38 militants were reportedly killed in the first two weeks of November. A security official said that fighting in Zinjibar was now more scattered and akin to a guerilla war, as the militants "do not have the manpower anymore to clash for continuous days as was the case two months ago." Heavy fighting broke out in mid-November with the army launching artillery shelling at the local government headquarters and the offices of the internal security agency which killed multiple foreign fighters. Ansar al-Sharia was reportedly regrouping during November due to persistent raids on houses in the city. Outside of the city, Ansar al-Sharia reportedly seized al-Kawd afters days of intense fighting.

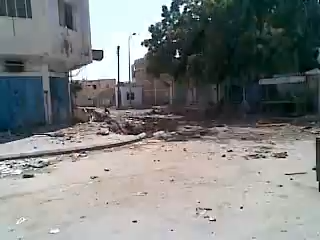
A street corner in Zinjibar, December 2011

Residents noticed significant militant reinforcements arriving in the city during December. On 7 December, the militants attempted a nighttime raid on an army post east of Zinjibar but failed, leaving nine fighters and a single soldier dead. Intense clashes broke out across the city on 17 December in an Ansar al-Sharia offensive, leaving seven militants, three soldiers dead and four army vehicles destroyed during the day. By 26 December at least 60 people, including 23 soldiers, had been killed. Clashes took place in the northern and eastern areas of Zinjibar, with army units reportedly advancing on some militant-controlled areas. Amidst the fighting, a US drone strike killed Abdulrahman al-Wuhayshi, a relative of Nasir al-Wuhayshi. Stories published by visiting Western journalists at the end of the year described most of the city, including its center and the northern and eastern entrance points, as still being mostly under Ansar al-Sharia control, and the battle being akin to a stalemate.

Clashes took place throughout January 2012 in the northern and eastern outskirts of Zinjibar. Returning residents found that control remained divided between the army in the east and the militants in the west, the two in some areas being separated by only meters. By February, with military options seemingly exhausted, the government reauthorized tribal mediation in hopes of a negotiated militant withdrawal similar to that in Radda a month before. A ceasefire was reportedly agreed upon by both parties on 4 February for the upcoming presidential elections, but this was denied by Ansar al-Sharia as clashes broke out the same day. The three days preceding the election saw an increase in attacks on local army positions. Ansar al-Sharia then attempted to push into the eastern suburbs of Zinjibar on 20 February, but were fought back by the 201st Mechanized Brigade.

=== Re-escalation (March–May 2012) ===
The political crisis in Yemen was alleviated with the appointment of Abdrabbuh Mansour Hadi as president on 25 February, replacing the ousted Saleh. During his inauguration speech, Hadi said that defeating AQAP would be a top priority for his government. As he set out on reorganizing the divided military, one of his first decisions was to dismiss General Mahdi Maqula from his position as Southern Military Region commander. After the military announced plans to intensify the fight in Zinjibar, Ansar al-Sharia declared a campaign of attacks against the government, and gave the military a 10-day ultimatum to withdraw.

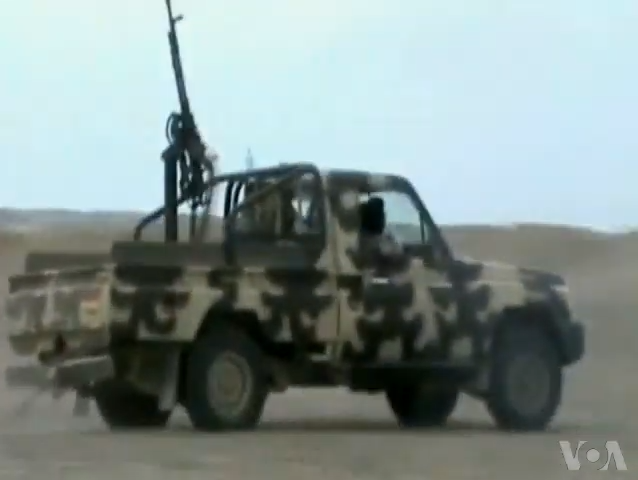
An army technical looted by militants during the Dofas attack

On 4 March, Ansar al-Sharia launched a major surprise attack on military positions near Zinjibar. The 39th Armoured Brigade artillery base at Dofas was raided and occupied in an early morning assault, while the 115th and 119th Infantry Brigade's held out for hours at their outposts in al-Kawd until reinforcements from Aden arrived. At least 185 soldiers were killed in the assault and droves of army equipment was looted, while the estimated total casualty figure of 400 effectively neutralized an entire brigade's worth of troops. Accusations emerged of Maqula, a Saleh loyalist, secretly supplying equipment to Ansar al-Sharia as he resisted orders to step down until he finally did so on the day of the attack.

Maqula's replacement, Major General Salem Ali Qatan, headed a renewed bombing campaign against the militants from 9 March onwards in response to the attack. On 18 March 2012, the Yemeni Navy reportedly conducted strikes on northeastern Zinjibar, killing 16 militants. Four days later, an alleged joint US-Yemeni naval bombardment on the city left 29 militants dead.

Efforts to combat Ansar al-Sharia escalated across Abyan in early April as pro-government forces fended off a militant assault on Lawdar. On 20 April, an official statement reported the army had advanced and secured a district on the outskirts of Zinjibar while killing 25 militants. Ansar al-Sharia acknowledged a "massive offensive by Sanaa regime forces" but said they still controlled most areas. Yemeni forces advanced deeper towards the center of Zinjibar after a six-hour battle which ended on 24 April. Multiple government buildings were secured, including the local post office, while heavy fighting continued to take place in the southern and eastern outskirts of the city. Ansar al-Sharia again denied the army's progress. On 8 May, another attack in Dofas and al-Kawd targeting the 2nd Infantry Battalion and the Artillery Battalion of the 115th Infantry Brigade left dozens of soldiers dead and captured, a day after a US drone strike killed AQAP leader Fahd al-Quso.

=== Final offensive (12 May – 12 June 2012) ===
On 12 May, the Yemeni government began large-scale offensive, codenamed Operation Golden Swords, to recapture Zinjibar and other areas occupied by Ansar al-Sharia in Abyan Governorate. Of the some 20,000 soldiers involved in fighting across Abyan, 10,000 were deployed to liberate Zinjibar, executing a crescent-shaped advance upon the city. On 13 May, government forces reached the Shaddad Fort, around three kilometers east of Zinjibar, and Zinjibar Bridge, just one kilometer south of it. By mid-May the army had reached the center of Zinjibar but "did not outright control it", with air force helicopters flying over the city for the first time since its seizure indicating the militants had lost their anti-air capabilities. A commanding officer said: "the army is deployed at the entrances of the city. It advances during the day and tactically retreats at night out of fear of terrorist attacks." Army forces were "moving slowly along the outskirts of... Zinjibar, trying to avoid being out-flanked", though the offensive in general had stalled in part due to poor intelligence on the status of the militants.

Resolve to defeat Ansar al-Sharia was increased following a suicide bombing in Sanaa on 21 May which killed nearly 100 soldiers. Government forces advanced into several parts of the central and northern neighborhoods of Zinjibar on 23 May, including a stadium and government buildings. Further advances were made on 26 May, with the 25th Mechanized Brigade capturing the northeastern neighbourhoods of Maraqid and Mashqasa while killing 20 militants and seizing their equipment. By end of the month, the 25th Mechanized Brigade, the 39th Armoured Brigade and tribal fighters (organized into Popular Committees) had managed to recapture all militant-held positions in eastern Zinjibar. 62 militants were believed to have been killed in the fighting, while dozens were wounded and many more fled. The 135th Infantry Brigade had also made significant advances towards Jaar.

Army forces conducted a maneuver which had "concentrically squeezed Zinjibar" from 3 June onwards. The Republican Guard was ordered to take a central role in the final stretch of recapturing the city. An army officer said government forces controlled most of the city's outskirts but not its center, and were attempting to secure the remaining northwestern entrances to "cut it off from Jaar and Shaqra." As Yemeni forces made inroads into central Zinjibar on 3 June, Ansar al-Sharia attempted to attack army positions at the Central Bank and other government institutions. Clashes in the central streets lasted for two hours and resulted in the army successfully repelling the militants, killing six while losing two soldiers. As more territory was secured, Ansar al-Sharia began to employ a guerilla strategy, constantly shifting positions in small cells and increasingly utilizing suicide bombers to impede the offensive. Two bombers had attempted to attack army positions east of the city on 4 June, but were stopped and only managed to kill four tribal fighters. Later in the day, Yemeni forces killed at least 23 militants entering from northern Zinjibar and from the southeast in al-Kawd.

Ansar al-Sharia's control of the region began to break down after the army captured the strategically-located 7 October ammunition factory in Jaar on 11 June. After bombarding the town throughout the night, Yemeni forces moved in and secured Jaar by dawn on 12 June. By then, Ansar al-Sharia had completely withdrew from the city. Later in the morning, the army and Popular Committees advanced and captured the rest of Zinjibar in a large-scale offensive movement. Final clashes for control over the city left 10 militants dead, but were relatively less intense as most militants had gone to reinforce Jaar earlier in the day. Abyan's governor said that 200 to 300 militants had fled Zinjibar and Jaar to the remaining areas under their control, notably Shuqrah in Abyan and Azzan in Shabwah. Ansar al-Sharia confirmed that it withdrew, claiming they had done so to avoid further destruction in the area and vowing revenge against the government. Senior government officials toured the city the next day in a confirmation of the victory.

== Foreign involvement ==
=== United States ===
The takeover of Zinjibar and other areas of Abyan alarmed the United States. American officials had been monitoring the situation in Zinjibar since the early stages of the battle. For years the US had viewed AQAP as the most dangerous branch of al-Qaeda globally since its attempts to attack the US mainland. Through the collapse of security in Abyan, the US government feared AQAP could consolidate control in the area through Ansar al-Sharia and use it as a base of operations for further attacks on the US.

Viewing it as one of the few ways to limit the group's rapid expansion, the US military resumed covert airstrikes against AQAP which had started in 2009 but were suspended the year after. The US launched at least six unilateral airstrikes on Zinjibar in 2011. These operations, conducted by the military's Joint Special Operations Command (JSOC) as well as the Central Intelligence Agency (CIA) starting in September, utilized cruise missiles, fixed-wing aircraft and unmanned aerial vehicles, and were independent of the Yemeni military. A police officer in Zinjibar claimed the strikes were "90 percent accurate."

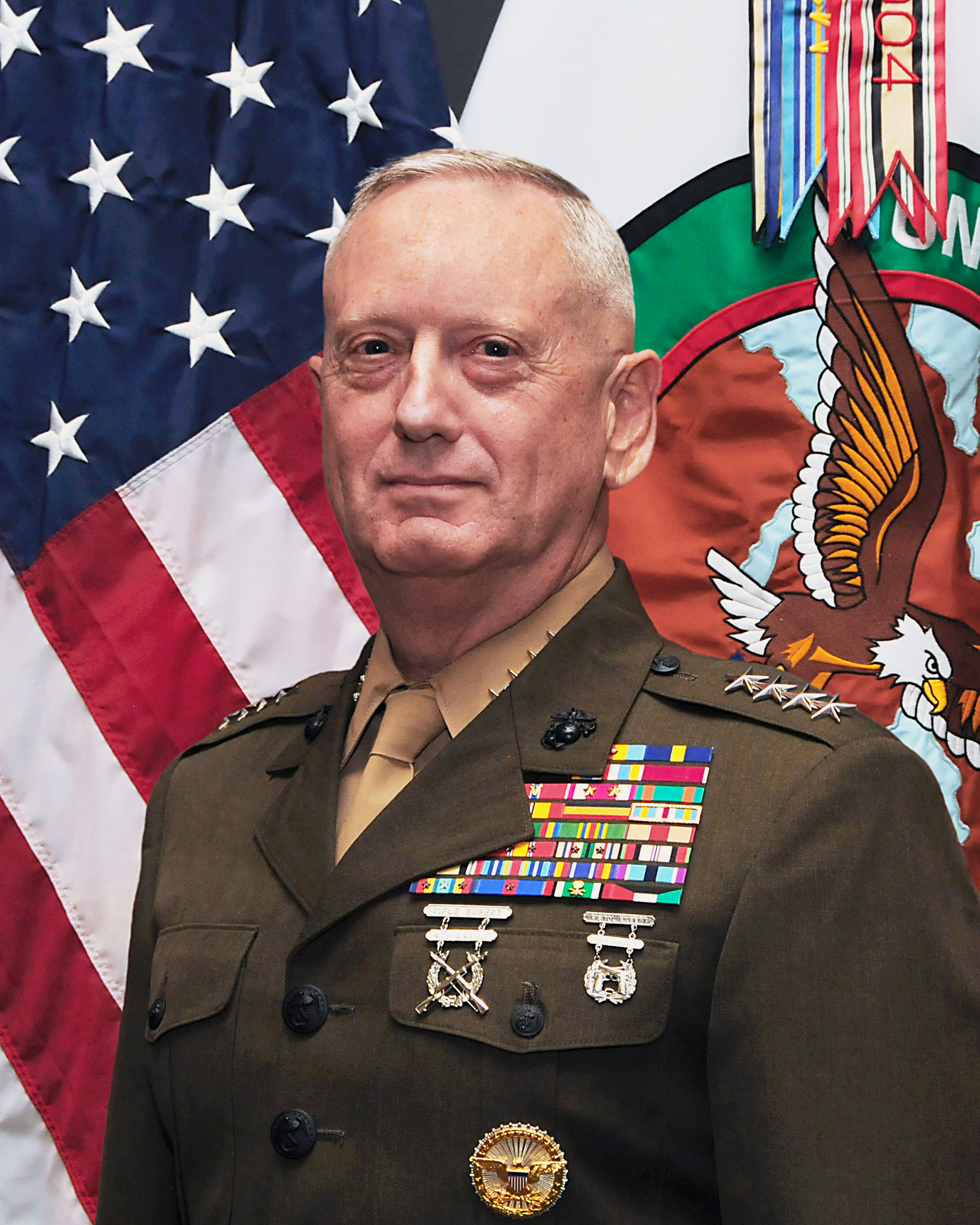
CENTCOM commander James Mattis advocated for greater US involvement in the battle early on but was denied by federal officials.

Several top officials, including President Barack Obama and homeland security advisor John Brennan, were intent on specifically targeting AQAP operatives involved in attacks on the US, viewing airstrikes on the localized insurgent group Ansar al-Sharia as tantamount to involving the US in Yemen's own war against al-Qaeda. A proposal from US Central Command commander James Mattis to launch an air raid on militants near the al-Wahda Stadium was rejected due to many intended targets being Ansar al-Sharia figures involved only in the local conflict. Despite this, The Washington Institute noted instances during the battle which veered into "intervention on the regime's behalf."

By early July 2011, as the besieged 25th Mechanized Brigade was nearing defeat, a surge of airstrikes, likely both Yemeni and American, helped push back Ansar al-Sharia forces. The US began to airdrop supplies to the brigade's base as the rest of the Yemeni army remained unable to reach them. Somali confirmed this and said there was an "active partnership" between the US and Yemeni forces in Zinjibar. According to him, the US would share real-time intelligence on militant positions in Zinjibar with Yemeni army units, who would then target the locations with artillery shelling and airstrikes.

The final push to lift the siege on the 25th Mechanized Brigade in September was influenced by American pressure on the Yemeni government. President Saleh thanked the US for its support upon the conclusion of the offensive. That month, a US military official told FDD's Long War Journal they "continue to provide counterterrorism aid, intelligence, and logistical support to Yemeni forces."

Upon reports emerging of naval strikes hitting Zinjibar in March 2012, analyst Bill Roggio noted that the Yemeni Navy was incapable of such attacks on land targets as it only possessed anti-ship missiles, suggesting it had been the work of the US Navy if true. He also noted the airstrikes had targeted low-level Ansar al-Sharia fighters as opposed to AQAP leaders, claiming "the US appears to be directly intervening in Yemen's civil war with AQAP." An official from the Fifth Fleet denied any American naval involvement in the conflict.

With Saleh's removal from office and the US government seeking to demonstrate its support for President Hadi, Operation Golden Swords received overt support from the US, described by Yemeni military personnel as "the most direct American involvement yet". Around 60 US soldiers were assigned to al-Anad Air Base to operate a long-term joint command center with Yemeni forces which would coordinate the offensive and monitor drone strikes. The offensive itself was being overseen by an unidentified US military general. Witnesses in Abyan reported both US drones and navy vessels on the coast launching strikes on militant positions during the offensive. US officials speaking to The Wall Street Journal in 2014 referred to the recapture of Zinjibar as an example of their counterterrorism stagery's success.

=== Saudi Arabia ===
Along with the US, Saudi Arabia gave similar concern to the rise of Ansar al-Sharia owing to AQAP's previous interest in attacking the Kingdom as well as Zinjibar's strategic position on the Gulf of Aden. The Saudi Air Force collaborated with their American counterparts in airdropping supplies to the 25th Mechanized Brigade. Saudis forces began launching airstrikes against the militants in August 2011 to assist in breaking the siege, and levied diplomatic pressure upon Yemen alongside the US until the siege was broken in September, when the Yemeni government acknowledged the "logistic support" provided to them by the Saudi government. Saudi Arabia also provided significant financial support for the Yemeni government to conduct Operation Golden Swords.

== Casualties ==
The official number of total casualties during the battle are unknown. Researcher Michael Knights wrote: "a conservative estimate would be around 500–700 government troops and Popular Committee fighters killed, plus an unknown number of civilians and Ansar al-Sharia fighters." Time claimed that "unofficial estimates" within the military put the figure at as many as 1,000 soldiers. Major General Nasser al-Taheri, who replaced Qatan as commander of the Southern Military Region, said at least 600 Ansar al-Sharia militants out of a total force of 3,000 were killed, several of them high-ranking commanders.

The official Saba News Agency reported on 11 September 2011, a day after the conclusion of the July–September offensive, that more than 280 pro-government forces were killed and 600 were wounded since the fighting began in May. Of those killed, around 230 were army soldiers from the Southern Military Region, of whom 90 were from the 25th Mechanized Brigade, while the other 50 were tribal fighters supporting the army. Over 300 Ansar al-Sharia militants were believed to have been killed, with Hadi telling European diplomats that 30 of them were leaders in the group. By the end of December, official figures put the total number of soldiers killed at around 270, and the number of militants at more than 400 according to local officials.

== Humanitarian impact ==
=== Militant governance ===
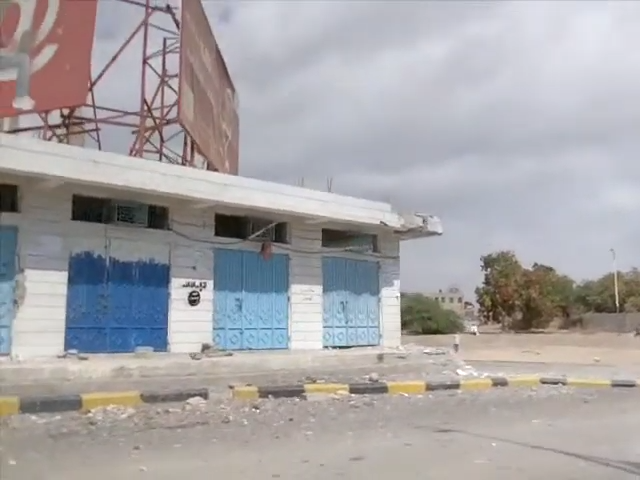
A building in Zinjibar with an Ansar al-Sharia seal written on it.

Upon solidifying control of Zinjibar, Ansar al-Sharia sought to govern the city as an Islamic emirate similar to that of the Taliban. Government institutions such as the local authority and education department were converted into an Islamist system. Legal courts adhering to Sharia were set up to address crime and civil disputes. The militants demanded strict adherence to their interpretation of Islam, and supporters of Saleh and the government were branded as infidels and American spies.

Ansar al-Sharia was also concerned with gaining popular support among the people of Zinjibar. The individuals Ansar al-Sharia put in charge of managing the city were local southerners rather than northern Yemenis or foreigners. Numerous displaced residents noted the politeness of the militants relative to government authorities beforehand and their eagerness to help locals. Limited public services were provided by the militants including road and electricity maintenance, food and water distribution, and garbage collection. Local merchants and shop owners were forced into lowering food prices. Militants conducted security patrols throughout the city and its surroundings, while others were tasked with guarding abandoned residencies to stop looters. Loudspeaker announcements would warn civilians of incoming artillery shelling. Residents wishing to leave would be permitted to do so and given a lump sum of money for support.

=== Refugee crisis ===
The intense fighting in Zinjibar led to nearly all of its some 20,000 residents deserting it within weeks. The few who stayed were often men guarding their property from looters. The nearby village of al-Kawd was also caught in the conflict and abandoned by civilians until only a handful of families remained. More than 90,000 people in total were believed to have been displaced by the conflict. Some had "camped under trees in rural areas outside the city", while many others wound up in the nearby governorates of Aden and Lahij occupying schools as makeshift refugee camps. The government estimated that more than 65% of the people displaced by the conflict were living in schools in Aden.

Within the schools in Aden, around 20 to 30 people slept in each classroom and lived off food donated by local charities. Shortages had been reported in electricity, food, water, and sleeping amenities in many schools. Displaced residents reported receiving minimal assistance from the government, which was instead supplemented by help from the local opposition movement and humanitarian agencies. Most had taken only what they could carry on themselves, in some cases with nothing at all.

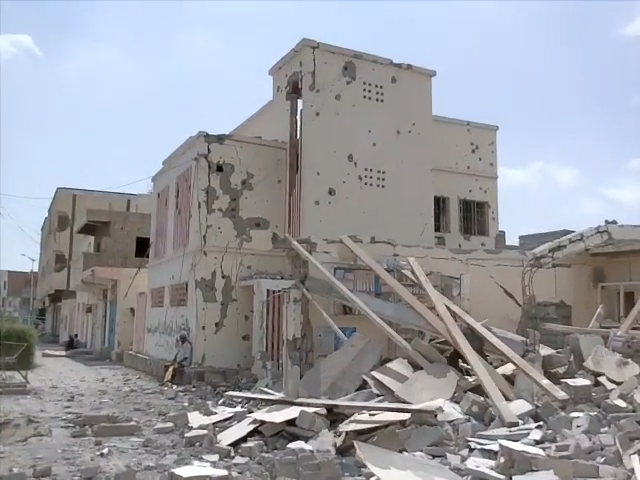
A returning civilian sitting next to a destroyed building in Zinjibar, January 2012.

In mid-January 2012, around 2,500 displaced residents returned to Zinjibar in a vehicular convoy agreed upon by both Ansar al-Sharia and the Yemeni government. The residents were welcomed by the militants in a festival and were allowed to visit the main city, which was held by Ansar al-Sharia, and other nearby areas before returning to Aden.

=== Destruction ===
The battle resulted in catastrophic and unprecedented destruction to Zinjibar. A local journalist in al-Kawd said the fighting was the most intense ever felt in the region, surpassing the wars of 1978, 1986 and 1994. Western journalists touring Zinjibar after its liberation noted the level of destruction; Adam Baron for Foreign Policy described it as "nearly apocalyptic", while Time war photographer Yuri Kozyrev compared it to the aftermath of the Battle of Grozny after the First Chechen War. The governor of Abyan, Jamal al-Aqel, said: "We found everything demolished. We started from scratch or even below that. The scope of the damage and destruction was much greater than we expected. Everything was flattened: the people, the buildings, the crops, the livestock and the land."

Hundreds of families returning to the city found their homes completely leveled or significantly damaged, resulting in many occupying government facilities such as Martyrs' Square. Structures which were destroyed or suffered damage included the administrative complex, which had been finished in 2010, residential apartments along the main road, along with banks, roads, and other buildings across the city. The water, sanitation, telecommunications, and electricity networks had all been disabled due to structural damage. The Bajdar and al-Saher neighborhoods suffered enormous damage. One residential area in Bajdar was so devastated that returning civilians had nicknamed it "Fallujah", in reference to the Iraqi city. In total, over 2,800 residential buildings and public facilities were officially estimated to have been affected by the conflict; the United Nations recorded 285 major structures being completely destroyed or seriously damaged. The projected cost for rebuilding the city was at $233 million.

=== Human rights violations ===
Organizations such as Human Rights Watch and Amnesty International determined by that mid-2011, the fighting in Zinjibar had developed into a non-international armed conflict. Application of international humanitarian law showed that both Ansar al-Sharia and Yemeni government forces committed several human rights violations during the battle. Numerous incidents of extrajudicial killings and executions of civilians, non-combatants, and captured soldiers were committed by Ansar al-Sharia. Militant fighters had fired small arms and explosive weapons in close proximity to civilian homes and structures, and were known to have occupied said abandoned buildings for military purposes.

The Yemeni military was accused of indiscriminately bombing Zinjibar without preemptively warning residents, leading to significant destruction in residential areas and civilian casualties. One resident said they called the head of the 25th Mechanized Brigade during the early stages of the battle pleading for a moratorium on the attacks to let civilians leave, but was ignored. The military justified the intense artillery shelling and airstrikes on the pretense that nearly all civilians had left the area, while the militants were free to fill the city with mines and booby traps.

== Analysis ==
The 25th Mechanized Brigade has been credited as the primary force defending Zinjibar for months on end in 2011, preventing Ansar al-Sharia from consolidating complete control of the region and further expanding. Military actions conducted by the brigade during this period were mostly defensive in nature, with offensive maneuvers primarily being relegated to artillery bombardments. This relative passivity was likely due to the significant supply issues caused by Ansar al-Sharia's control of the road to Aden and the impact of the revolution, which prevented military logistics coordination in Sanaa. Therefore the brigade "may have feared initiating offensive actions that they could not finish", resulting in the status quo being held until the revolution was brought to a close in 2012.

The military partnered with the tribes of Abyan as relations between the latter and AQAP had soured. AQAP previously operated in a subordinative relationship to the tribes, but the group grew more bold with the ascension of Ansar al-Sharia. The Baleed tribe was the first to call for unity among the regional tribes, especially the powerful Fadhl tribe, against Ansar al-Sharia in early July, noting the presence of foreign fighters among them. Tribal leader Ahmed al-Rahawi said tribesmen could use their knowledge of traditional warfare tactics to meet the militants at the same level compared to the military. Somali noted the unique abilities of tribal fighters during the offensive, stating "the people of the area are aware of the circumstances of their area better than the regular forces. They can also distinguish between the armed men and they know from where they have come and to which tribes they belong."

=== Strategic value ===
Zinjibar is located east of the Bab al-Mandab, a major oil shipping strait. It is also located around 35 kilometers east of the strategic port city of Aden, the second largest city in Yemen. Ansar al-Sharia's occupation of Zinjibar allowed them to cut off the only road connecting Abyan and Shabwah to Aden. Analysts and security officials believed that if Ansar al-Sharia was allowed to fully consolidate control over Zinjibar and eliminate nearby military forces, it would have used the city as a base of operations to further expand towards and eventually try to seize Aden. Critical Threats analyst Katherine Zimmerman wrote on the scenario in July 2011:

The fall of Aden raises the possibility of the fall of the south, which will have resounding effects on the future of the Yemeni state. Al-Qaeda would gain relative freedom of movement from the Arabian Sea to the Saudi border, significantly increasing the risk of an attack on an international or Saudi oil target, and could erect a form of an Islamist government in its territories. The Yemeni state would not only lose its southern port city of Aden, but would also lose revenues from southern oil. Should the Yemeni military or some other actor fail to halt al-Qaeda's advance, there is the very real prospect that al-Qaeda could establish an Islamic emirate in south Yemen.

Insurgent activity in Aden saw a notable increase in June and July 2011. This included several assassinations against military officials and suicide attacks targeting military reinforcements heading to Zinjibar. The uptick in militant activity eventually drew the attention of the central government, which responded by establishing a security cordon around Aden and sending additional reinforcements to Zinjibar which managed to push the frontlines to within Abyan by August. Zimmerman said the deployment of these forces did not serve the goal of defeating the militants in Zinjibar but was instead done to secure Aden from the militants. She described army gains during the July–September offensive as "tenuous at best", noting that progress had stalled later on and only picked up beginning in April 2012.

=== Alleged complacency or support for Ansar al-Sharia ===
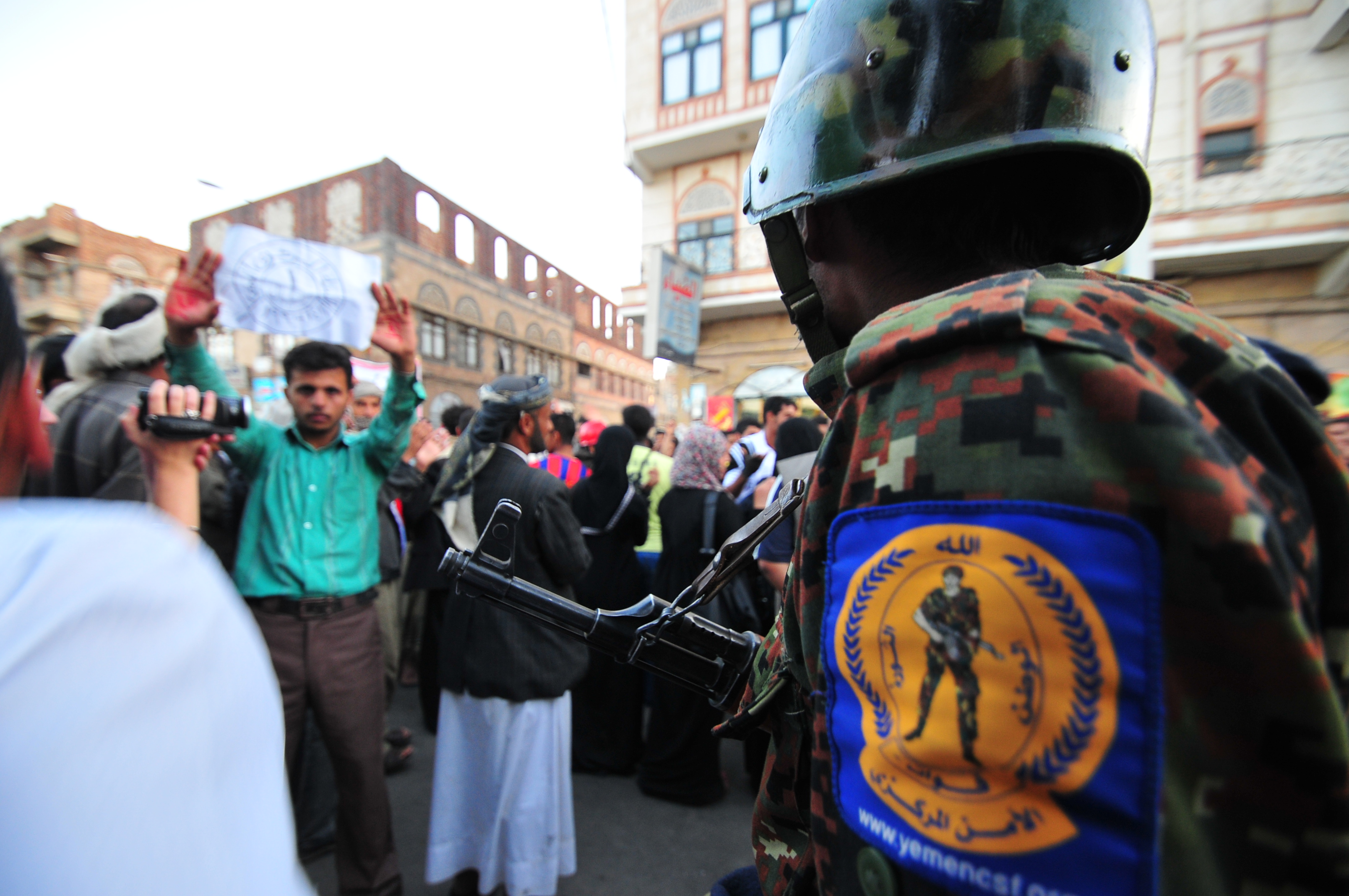
The Central Security Forces were mostly deployed to suppress protests (pictured above in Sanaa) rather than to fight in Zinjibar.

Within the context of the then-ongoing revolution, the seizure of Zinjibar provoked suspicion and allegations that the Saleh regime had willfully or intentionally let the city fall. The CSF and the Republican Guard, both of which were supposed to protect Zinjibar but withdrew without a fight, were loyal to Saleh throughout the revolution, being commanded by his nephew Yahya Saleh and son Ahmed Saleh respectively. The US-trained and funded counterterrorism units were instead deployed in Sanaa to help quell the revolution. Accusations were also levied against Saleh loyalists within the military for not combating and even aiding the militants in the fight for Zinjibar. Maqula was criticized internally for allegedly obstructing efforts to resupply the army. The Yemeni Air Force, ran by Saleh's half-brother Mohammed Saleh al-Ahmar, committed several friendly fire incidents during the battle, such as the one against allied tribal forces in July 2011 and another against the pro-revolution 119th Infantry Brigade in October, which further inflamed the accusations.

There are many conspiracy theories about how we lost Zinjibar... Many thought that there was a deal between Saleh and the jihadis. The truth is much simpler: the army leadership is rotten and corrupt. Why would a soldier fight if the army is split in Sanaa?

— A lieutenant in the 25th Mechanized Brigade

Foreign minister Abu Bakr al-Qirbi publicly denied any such conspiracy relating to the battle. Numerous opposition figures levied accusations against the regime regardless. This included Ahmar and other allied generals, who released a joint statement accusing Saleh of "surrendering Abyan [Governorate] to an armed terrorist group" shortly after the fall of Zinjibar. Yemen expert Gregory D. Johnsen said that gauging the regime's complacency with the militants could not be done without independent observers in Zinjibar, and that "the conspiracy theories ignore the real possibility of a wider militant takeover." General Somali denied accusations of complicity among the security forces which fled Zinjibar, instead blaming their retreat on "cowardice and fear" after all the officials had left. One lieutenant in the 25th Mechanized Brigade said that Zinjibar had fallen simply due the army's corruption and divisions leading to a lack of will to fight for the city.

Many opposition figures and political analysts alike suspected that Saleh had let Zinjibar fall as a ploy to convince Yemenis as well as international observers, particularly the United States and neighboring Arab nations, that having himself in power was needed to prevent chaos and the complete usurpation of Yemen by AQAP. Saleh was known to have historically exaggerated the al-Qaeda threat in Yemen and even collude with jihadists in order to amass more financial aid from the US and Saudi Arabia to solidify his rule. Even if the regime didn't directly facilitate the takeover, it did utilize its existence to pressure the US between its position on the revolution and fighting AQAP.

Saleh's alleged plot had ultimately failed. Rather than full-scale intervention and political support for his regime, the US provided support to Yemeni forces on the ground directly involved in the fighting and escalated its independent drone strike program. The US determined it had no reason keep engaging with the regime in its declining state, and instead doubled down on support for the Hadi administration upon its inauguration.

== Aftermath ==
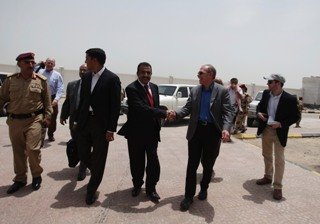
USAID administrator Rajiv Shah (centre) during a trip to Yemen from 19 to 21 June 2012, in which he toured Zinjibar.

Prior to their withdrawal, Ansar al-Sharia planted landmines and other booby traps within the wreckage in Zinjibar, significantly hindering debris-clearing efforts. Up to 10,000 landmines in total were estimated to have been placed in the city, killing around 100 people, mostly women and children. From the end of the battle to mid-July, a military demining team managed to defuse more than 3,000 mines in Zinjibar and surrounding areas. Demining efforts continued into 2013, with the Yemen Executive Mine Action Centre reporting in October that Zinjibar would be cleared of landmines by the end of the year.

Abyan's governor reported in July 2012 that their top priorities were to restore basic services to the city and remove landmines. Electricity pylons were beginning to be reconstructed and water was being pumped into the city. A report by pan-Arab newspaper al-Hayat in December of that year described numerous lingering issues facing the city's populace. Much of the city was still contaminated by landmines, and many residents were living in public buildings as they were yet to have their houses rebuilt or receive compensation. Delays were hampering reconstruction and infrastructure initiatives, which residents attributed to corruption within the official bodies involved. An unidentified skin disease was also reportedly spreading among some of the populace.

== See also ==
- Fall of Zinjibar and Jaar (2015)
