= Mohammed al-Somali =

Former Yemeni military officer

Mohammed Abdullah al-Somali
- محمد عبد الله الصوملي
- Born: January 1965 (age 61); Shaharah, Amran Governorate, Yemen
- Military career
- Allegiance: Yemen
- Branch: Yemeni Land Forces
- Service years: 1980s–2014
- Rank: Major general
- Unit: 314th Armoured Brigade
- Commands: Al-Ghaydah Brigades (1994–2004); 107th Infantry Brigade (2004–2010); 25th Mechanized Brigade (2010–2012); 37th Armoured Brigade (2012–2013); 1st Military Region (2013–2014)
- Conflicts: Al-Qaeda insurgency in Yemen; Battle of Zinjibar (2011–2012); 2012 Abyan offensive

Mohammed Abdullah al-Somali (Note: Arabic: محمد عبد الله الصوملي; also transliterated as al-Sumali, al-Sawmali, al-Somli and al-Sumli.) (born January 1965) is a former Yemeni military officer. Somali received education at the Yemeni Military Academy, and held several posts in the Yemeni army in the 1990s and 2000s. He came to prominence in 2011 and 2012 as commander of the 25th Mechanized Brigade, the military unit at the forefront of the Battle of Zinjibar. Somali led the brigade as it was besieged at its base for months by Ansar al-Sharia, while surviving two assassination attempts by the group before army reinforcements arrived in September 2011. After Zinjibar was liberated during the 2012 Abyan offensive, he was promoted to Major General and assigned to the 1st Military Region from 2013 to 2014.

== Biography ==
=== Early life and career ===
Somali was born in January 1965 from a Yemeni family in Shaharah, Arman Governorate. He attended the national Military Academy, where he obtained a bachelor's degree in military science in 1984, a bachelor's in law in 1988, and a master's degree in military science in 1994. Somali first served in the 314th Armoured Brigade of the Yemeni army, in which progressed through the ranks from platoon leader, to company commander, to battalion commander, to training officer, and eventually brigade operations chief. He was then transferred to command the al-Ghaydah Brigades, which he led from 1994 until 2004, when he was transferred to command the 107th Infantry Brigade based in Thamud. During this period, he rose to the position of Colonel in 2000, and then Brigadier General in 2007.

=== 25th Mechanized Brigade ===
I met with the brigade's officers and told them: We will not withdraw and will not give up our weapons to Al-Qaeda. The people will never say that we have been defeated by an armed gang that uses religious as a tool whilst in reality having nothing to do with religion. I told them that I am personally going to fight until a breakthrough is brought by God or until I am martyred, even if I must do so alone.

— Mohammed al-Somali, upon being asked by Asharq Al-Awsat on why the 25th Mechanized Brigade continued to fight in Zinjibar

In March 2010, Somali was appointed the commander of the 25th Mechanized Brigade based in Zinjibar, the capital of Abyan Governorate. Somali and his unit played a key role in the Battle of Zinjibar, defending the city against militants from the Islamist group Ansar al-Sharia. When hundreds of militants from the group invaded Zinjibar on 27 May 2011, Somali and the 25th Mechanized Brigade were the only military units to remain and defend the city as the others fled in the chaos. As the militants attacked their base, Somali contacted defected general Ali Mohsen al-Ahmar to request that troops from the nearby 119th Infantry Brigade be sent to reinforce them, but was rejected as he refused to take a stance in the Yemeni revolution. With no other military units in the area, Ansar al-Sharia managed to completely capture Zinjibar and besiege the 25th Mechanized Brigade at their base.

Asharq Al-Awsat published a phone interview with Somali on 30 July 2011. In the interview, he said that the siege on the 25th Mechanized Brigade was still in place and that they were running short on supplies such as food and water. He criticised the Southern Military Region command for its inability to send reinforcements to the brigade, which he blamed on "a lack of planning, hesitation, and fear". He said that they would continue to fight against the militants regardless of whether they received support from the rest of the military or not. Somali also denied claims among the Yemeni opposition that the regime of President Ali Abdullah Saleh had intentionally let Zinjibar fall in order to "play the Al Qaeda card", suggesting instead that the quick withdrawal of most security forces in the city may have simply been due to "cowardice."

After the two-month long army offensive, the siege on the 25th Mechanized Brigade was lifted on 10 September 2011, though fighting continued as the army succeeded in capturing only the eastern portion of the city. Somali gave an interview and tour of Zinjibar's frontlines to journalist Jeremy Scahill, who published an article for The Nation on 15 February 2012. Somali described the course of the battle and the siege, and the two assassination attempts he suffered by Islamist snipers. He detailed support given to his brigade by the United States, which provided supply airdrops to their base and real-time intelligence on militant whereabouts. Despite many reports of their linkage, Somali said that he could not definitively assert a connection between Ansar al-Sharia and al-Qaeda in the Arabian Peninsula, though his forces would continue to fight against them regardless. Regarding the militants themselves, he said that "These guys are incredibly brave,... If I had an army full of men with that bravery, I could conquer the world."

A large scale, month-long offensive to recapture Ansar al-Sharia's seized territory saw the complete liberation of Zinjibar and neighbouring Jaar on 12 June 2012. The 25th Mechanized Brigade took part in the intensified battle to reclaim Zinjibar, and Somali confirmed the army's success to media on the day of its capture.

=== Later postings ===
After the expulsion of Ansar al-Sharia from Abyan, President Abdrabbuh Mansour Hadi issued a decree assigning Somali to the 37th Armoured Brigade of the Eastern Military Region in Hadhramaut Governorate later in June 2012. Hadi had attempted months earlier to assign Tareq Saleh, nephew of the former president, to lead the brigade, but he rejected him and demanded that he remain a Republican Guard commander in Sanaa. Somali denied media reports that he rejected his own appointment, and further denied claims that the 25th Mechanized Brigade was protesting against its new leader, stating that they had actually been angered by the Ministry of Defense for not following through with its plan to reassign the brigade to another location in order for it to regain its strength after the Zinjibar campaign.

As part of Hadi's military restructuring process, Somali was appointed the commander of the newly-formed 1st Military Region on 10 April 2013, while also being promoted to the rank of Major General. He was removed from the position and replaced by Abdul Rahman al-Halili in July 2014. This had come after a renewed al-Qaeda insurgency in the region, and a recent attack on government institutions in Seiyun, close to where his office was located. Somali stated that he accepted the decision and was open to serving any military position offered to him in the future.
