= Adel al-Abab =

Salafi jihadist theologist

Adel bin Abdullah bin Thabit al-Abab
- عادل بن عبد الله بن ثابت العباب
- Born: 1976 or 1977; Ar Radmah district, Ibb Governorate, Yemen
- Died: 4 October 2012; Saeed, Shabwah Governorate, Yemen
- Cause of death: Drone strike
- Military career
- Allegiance: Al-Qaeda in the Arabian Peninsula
- Branch: Sharia committee
- Service years: 2007–2012
- Rank: Sharia official
- Nickname: Abu Zubayr

Adel bin Abdullah bin Thabit al-Abab (Note: Arabic: عادل بن عبد الله بن ثابت العباب) (1976 or 1977 – 4 October 2012), also known by the kunya Abu Zubayr, (Note: Arabic: أبو الزبير) was a Salafi jihadist theologist in Yemen and a high-ranking leader of al-Qaeda in the Arabian Peninsula (AQAP). Abab attended an orthodox Salafi institution in Sanaa prior to joining al-Qaeda in Yemen (AQY) and eventually serving as head of the sharia committee of AQAP. Utilizing his religious credentials, Abab served an ideological role in AQAP and its propaganda, calling for the implementation of Islamic law and justifying jihad against Arab governments. Abab was killed in a drone strike launched by the United States on 4 October 2012. At the time of his death, he was considered the fourth most-important leader of AQAP.

== Biography ==
Abab was born to a Yemeni family tracing its roots to Ar Radmah district in Ibb Governorate. His father was a preacher and former imam at a mosque in Sanaa. Abab attended and graduated from the Scientific Da'awa Centre for Sharia Sciences in Sanaa, which subscribes to traditional Salafi thought. After graduating, he remained at the school to work as a librarian, his tenure filled with constant theological arguments between him and both professors and students. He eventually left his position in the aftermath of the 2006 Sanaa prison escape, which precipitated the resurgence of AQY. By July 2007, authorities knew of his membership in the group, which had just announced the selection of Nasir al-Wuhayshi as its leader. The Political Security Organization imprisoned his three brothers for several years in an attempt to force his surrender, though it did not affect his resolve.

By the time of AQAP's formation, Abab was seen as the highest-ranking authority within the group in regards to internal implementation of Sharia and justification for attacks. He served as the head of AQAP's Sharia committee, which included other religious figures such as Ibrahim al-Rubaish, Khaled Batarfi, and Anwar al-Awlaki. He was featured in media produced by the group, including videos, its Arabic magazine Sada al-Malahem, and its English magazine Inspire. According to the Jamestown Foundation, Abab's role was "trying to differentiate his view on the importance of the establishment of Sharia rule from the elite's version of the debate by taking large sections from the Quran as well as the Hadiths (statements attributed to the Prophet Muhammed) and putting them into an easily digestible rhetoric for the public’s consumption." His presence also helped in the recruitment of suicide bombers into the group.

Abab was the first member of AQAP to publicly mention Ansar al-Sharia, seen by analysts as a front group to increase its appeal locally. He did so during an online forum interview on 18 April 2011, a month after AQAP militants had captured Jaar, during which he said that "The name Ansar al-Shariah is what we use to introduce ourselves in areas where we work to tell people about our work and goals, and that we are on the path of Allah." Le Monde later wrote that Abab was present in Zinjibar, which had been captured by the militants a month later, according to video recordings of him filmed by displaced residents.

== Views ==
Abab's works were heavily concerned with the perceived infidelity of the Arab world's governments, particularly those of Yemen and Saudi Arabia. In a highly disseminated speech called "Haqiqat al-Hukkam" (the Reality of the Rulers), Abab claimed that, because Arab states were sidelining Islam and Sharia for secularism and man-made law, they were considered to be committing Kufr al-Akbar. He lists five reasons for Muslim rulers being Kafirs; their participation in the war on terror, tolerance of American embassies on their land (which, according to him, contained intelligence services spying on mujahideen), promotion of "infidel" sects and secularism, support for American and Western soldiers on the Red Sea coast, and tolerance of media which insults Allah and the Prophet Muhammad. Abab criticized sheikhs who supported Arab regimes, and claimed that the Arab Spring was "because the Almighty is ordering change against the tyrants."

In an article for the magazine Sada al-Jihad (Echo of Holy War), Abab listed several ways for Muslims to help establish Sharia in and exercise jihad against infidel states. He justified attacks on embassies and the killing of their Muslims employees, such as in the case of the 2008 attack on the United States embassy in Sanaa. He permitted suicide attacks, as well as the killing of Yemeni soldiers and non-Muslim civilians in the fourth issue of Inspire. Abab had voiced hostility towards the Houthis, which he claimed "follow Iran's Twelver Shiism."

== Death ==
Abab was killed in a US drone strike on 4 October 2012. According to a local tribal chief, Abab was targeted in Saeed, a village in Shabwah Governorate, alongside multiple other militants travelling in a single vehicle. Upon seeing the drone, Abab got out and attempted to escape but was struck in the head by shrapnel after the car was hit and died hours later. He was buried in the village by the locals alongside an Egyptian militant, while the other militants killed were taken elsewhere. On 12 February 2013, an AQAP source confirmed the death of Abab to Agence France-Presse but differed on the manner of his death, instead claiming that he had escaped the car and managed to reach a mountainous area before being killed by another airstrike. He was believed to have been 35 years old by the time of his death.

At the time of his death, Abab had been seen as the fourth highest-ranking leader within the organization, only behind emir Wuhayshi, deputy emir Said Ali al-Shihri, and military leader Qasim al-Raymi. He was also seen as the fourth most-important al-Qaeda member to have been killed by an airstrike in Yemen, behind only Abu Ali al-Harithi, Anwar al-Awlaki, and Fahd al-Quso.
