= Siege of Lawdar (2010) =

2010 Yemeni army offensive

- Part of the al-Qaeda insurgency in Yemen and the South Yemen insurgency
Date	19–24 August 2010 (5 days)
Location	Lawdar, Abyan Governorate, Yemen 13°53′0″N 45°52′0″E
Status	Yemeni victory: Government forces secure Lawdar; Most AQAP forces escape

Belligerents
Yemen	al-Qaeda in the Arabian Peninsula; Southern Movement (alleged by Yemen, denied)

Commanders and leaders
Mohammed Nasser Ahmed	(al-Qaeda in the Arabian Peninsula) Salah Ali Abdullah Al-Damani; (al-Qaeda in the Arabian Peninsula) Adel Saleh Hardaba †

Units involved
Yemeni Armed Forces; Yemeni Land Forces; Ministry of Interior; Central Security Organization; Central Security Forces	Unknown

Strength
Hundreds of soldiers	(al-Qaeda in the Arabian Peninsula) ~200 fighters; (Southern Movement) ~200 fighters

Casualties and losses
Per AFP: 11 killed (Note: From 20–24 August)	Per Yemen: 12 killed; Per AFP: 19 killed
- 3 civilians killed; 3,000 displaced
- Location within Yemen

In August 2010, Yemeni security forces conducted a military operation in Lawdar, a town in Abyan Governorate, in response to several attacks by al-Qaeda in the Arabian Peninsula (AQAP). Those attacks were preceded by an intensified wider insurgency against the government. The Yemeni army, under direct supervision by defense minister Mohammed Nasser Ahmed, besieged Lawdar on 20 August and urged its resident to evacuate, claiming it would raid neighbourhood harboring militants belonging to AQAP as well as the Southern Movement, a secular separatist coalition. Fighting broke out 22 August and continued into the next day until AQAP initiated a withdrawal from the town. The Yemeni government declared victory the following day, although militant activity persisted in Lawdar for several months.

The siege was the first in a series of operations against AQAP, another occurring in the town of al-Huta in September. The operation displaced 3,000 civilians in Lawdar and triggered backlash from the Southern Movement, which maintained that it did not participate in the fighting. Analyst regarded the siege as the first large-scale military operation conducted by the Yemeni government against AQAP, although its effectiveness was questioned.

== Background ==
The Yemeni government intensified counterterrorism operations against al-Qaeda in the Arabian Peninsula (AQAP) in 2009 following pressure from regional powers in the Arab world as well as the United States, particularly after AQAP claimed responsibility for an attempted bombing of an American airliner on 25 December. The Barack Obama administration ramped up pressure on Yemen to address the AQAP threat, and allocated further financial support and training for the Yemeni military.

In previous years the Yemeni government opted to avoid direct conflict with AQAP, instead utilizing "a dual approach of tribal mediation and overt military demonstrations." Operations against AQAP were mostly of a smaller scale. But diverging from al-Qaeda core's goals of attacking the West, AQAP began to further target the Yemeni state following a declaration of war against it in June 2010. Attacks on top officials convinced the Yemeni government to view the AQAP threat more seriously, with President Ali Abdullah Saleh further siding with the US and calling AQAP the top threat in the country.

Attacks and assassinations against security officials in southern Yemen, including Abyan Governorate, had increased in the two previous months. AQAP's primary areas of operation reside in southern and Abyan, with the town of Lawdar being acknowledged as a safe haven for the group. The possibility of mediation to avoid conflict in the south was stymied by a weaker local tribal system.

== Battle ==
=== Initial attacks ===
The conflict was instigated by an AQAP ambush on Yemeni soldiers in Lawdar on 19 August. During that attack, AQAP gunmen encountered a small group of soldiers in a crowded souk. Witness accounts described the soldiers surrendering their weapons and pleading to the militants before they opened fire. At least two soldiers were killed in the shooting. The army sent additional units into Lawdar in response, leading to a two hour long gun battle in which another two soldiers were wounded before the militants fled.

Clashes in Lawdar on 20 August left a total of 21 people dead according to the Ministry of Interior, including 11 soldiers. Eight soldiers were reportedly killed when AQAP operatives ambushed their vehicle in a rocket-propelled grenade attack. Varying reports on the events have emerged, one suggesting the fighting started from a dispute with the locals after a security vehicle entered the Lawdar marketplace, and another claiming it stemmed from local Southern Movement activists resisting arrest.

The army retaliated by bombarding buildings near the local marketplace from which they were attacked. Three civilians; a woman, a child, and a market vendor, were killed, and four others were wounded. Artillery shells reportedly fell near a kindergarten and a fish market in center al Lawdar. Seven AQAP militants were killed in the engagement according to the government, including three foreign fighters of unspecified nationalities, while three others were captured after being wounded and were interrogated. Three militants who escaped the fighting were identified as Ahmed Mohammed Abdu Daradish, Abdel Rauf Abdullah Mohammed Nassib and Jalal Saleh Mohammed Saidi.

=== Military operation ===
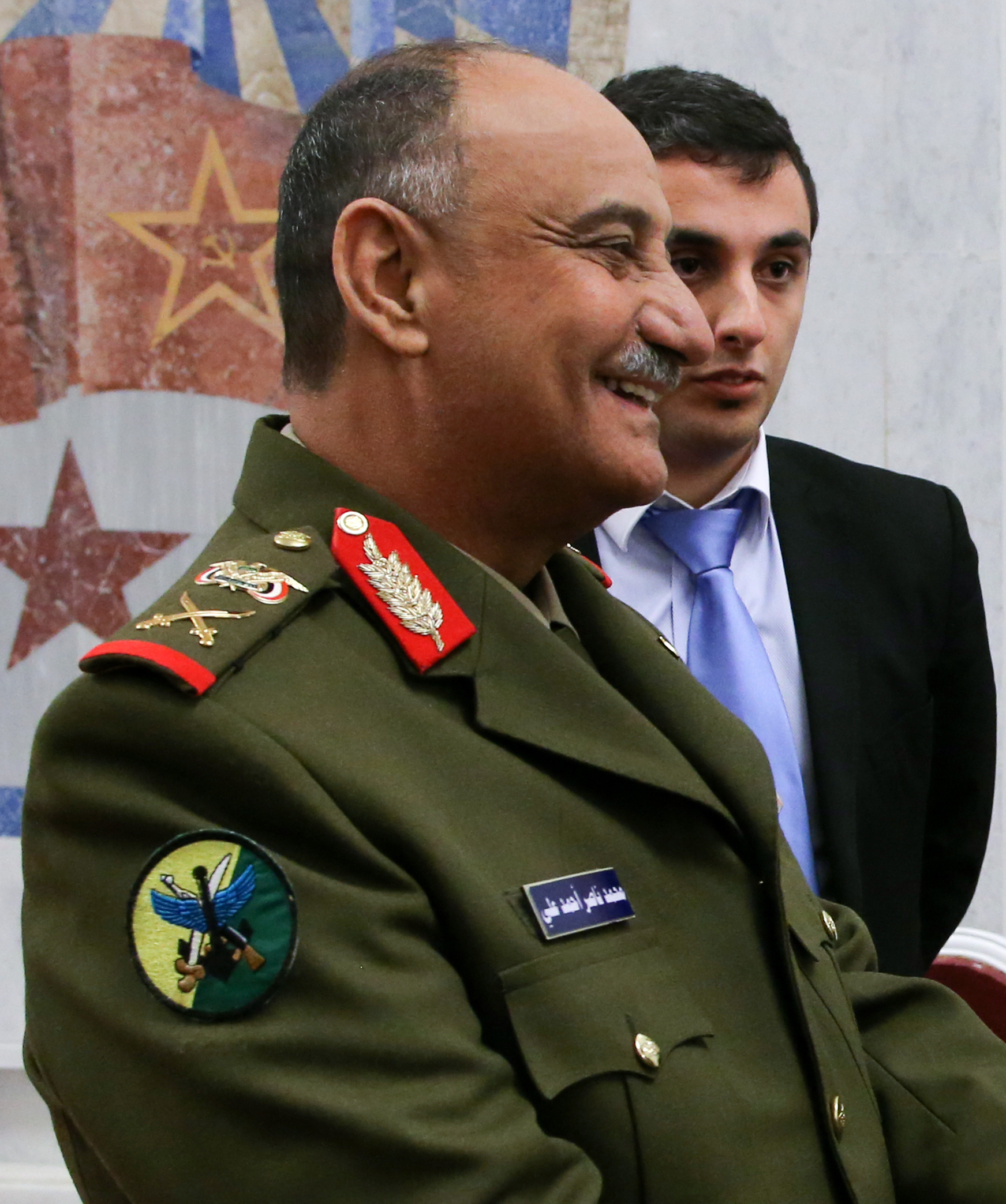
Defense minister Mohammed Nasser Ahmed was in charge of the operation.

In response to the attacks, the government sent hundreds of soldiers to besiege Lawdar by the afternoon of 20 August. An operation to drive out the AQAP presence in the town was directly overseen by defense minister Mohammed Nasser Ahmed. Army reinforcements took positions at the entrances of Lawdar throughout the night of 21 August into 22 August, while pamphlets were distributed to civilians urging them to leave as security forces prepared to move in and launch raids on homes believed to be AQAP safehouses. One resident said the army was deployed in the village of Al-Ayn and the power station at the entrance of Lawdar, preparing to launch an offensive.

Security officials believed there were up to 200 AQAP fighters in Lawdar, along with another 200 from the Southern Movement, a secular secessionist coalition which the government alleged were fighting alongside AQAP. These claims were denied by the Southern Movement. An ultimatum for all militants in Lawdar to surrender was issued by authorities at 3:00 a.m. local time and expired the same day at 3:00 p.m. on 22 August, followed by clashes breaking out in the city at 5:00 p.m. By that point, the army claimed that most civilians had left Lawdar and those who remained were AQAP militants, some of whom were suspected to be Saudi and Pakistani foreign fighters.

Army soldiers raided a home belonging to a local AQAP commander and killed three militants, while two were killed as they attempted an RPG attack on the local CSF headquarters. Army forces raided several other barricaded houses, where they found large stashes of heavy weaponry including rockets and anti-tank weapons. Intense clashes continued to take place during the night. Abyan security chief General Abdel Razak Maruni said seven militants in total were killed during the day, as others were besieged in the houses they occupied.

=== AQAP withdrawal ===
Military officials reported heavy artillery shelling taking place against AQAP-occupied houses in Lawdar on 23 August. After clashes earlier in the day had left four of their fighters dead, AQAP transported their wounded out of Lawdar and began withdrawing from the town. By the afternoon of 24 August, Yemeni officials reported that the army had entered Lawdar and had retaken control over most of the city. By late noon, the government declared full control over Lawdar, with deputy interior minister Saleh al-Zaweri stating that security forces were "chasing the runaway elements".

An Agence France-Presse tally based on official and medical sources placed the total death count since 20 August at 33 people, them being 11 soldiers, 19 militants and three civilians. Government sources instead reported the deaths of 12 militants, all of them Yemenis. Among the militant casualties included Adel Saleh Hardaba, a 27-year-old AQAP member believed to be the group's second-in-command for Lawdar. According to Ellen Knickmeyer of GlobalPost, the main AQAP force managed to escape Lawdar.

== Aftermath ==
The operation in Lawdar was referred to as the "opening salvo" in a military campaign undertaken by Yemeni security forces against AQAP. In response to a plot to bomb the newly-constructed Yemen LNG pipeline on 21 September, the Yemeni military besieged the town of al-Hawtah in Abyan's neighboring Shabwah Governorate to expel AQAP forces. The Yemeni government was reportedly planning further operations against AQAP involving airstrikes and US-trained Yemeni special forces.

Despite the official claim that AQAP was completely expelled from Lawdar through the operation, insurgent presence persisted in the area. Clashes near Lawdar on 27 August left a reported 11 soldiers and two militants dead, including Hardaba who was previously claimed to have been killed, while a reported would-be suicide bomber heading to Lawdar was arrested further north in Abyan. 12 militants were killed in clashes on 31 August, while Fadl tribe sheikh Hussein Saleh Majdal, the lead mediator between AQAP and government forces in Lawdar, was assassinated with his two bodyguards on 4 September. Salah Ali Abdullah Al-Damani, the alleged leader of AQAP forces in Lawdar district, was captured the next day. AQAP was reported to have mostly pulled out of Lawdar by 9 September. However, an ambush on an army convoy in the town in January 2011 underscored their continued presence.

=== Impact ===
According to the interior ministry and local officials, of the population of nearly 80,000 people in Lawdar and the surrounding areas, a reported 3,000 residents left their homes due to the fighting, including more than 1,000 families. Residents were displaced from their homes for three days before being allowed to return. Jamal al-Najjar, a public information assistant with the United Nations High Commissioner for Refugees, said they had "no sufficient information regarding the displaced persons" at the time, and could not provide humanitarian assistance without prior coordination with the Yemeni government.

Human Rights Watch associate Letta Tayler cited local sources reporting hundreds of homes being damaged in the assault. Arabic newspaper Elaph reported from anonymous sources that army shelling in the town was indiscriminate. News Yemen reported that most shops in the town were closed down due to the fighting, and many did not attend Tarawih prayers at the local mosque as is tradition for Muslims during Ramadan.

=== Reactions ===
==== Southern Movement ====
The Southern Movement reacted negatively to the initial fighting. Aidarous Haqis, a Southern Movement figure in Abyan, denied any linkage between the coalition and the fighting, maintaining that it only engaged in peaceful activates while criticizing the military response. The Southern Democratic Assembly, a separatist organization based in London, called on the international community to "provide international protection for our people and bring the murderers and the perpetrators of these massacres led by the criminal (Yemeni President) Ali Abdullah Saleh to international courts to receive the punishment for what they did." It also claimed that "AQAP and the forces of terrorism is a product par excellence of the president of Yemen".

Ali Salem al-Beidh, a prominent separatist figure and former president of South Yemen, said the operation had targeted the Southern Movement and only used the pretext of fighting AQAP as a smokescreen, calling it "an excuse (by Sanaa) to gain international support... and trying to gather international aid from countries fighting terror." He reiterated the Southern Movement's opposition to AQAP and called on "the Arab League and the United Nations to immediately intervene to investigate the Sanaa regime's claims and violations."

As part of a series of wider demonstrations in southern Yemen on 23 September ahead of a meeting between the Friends of Yemen international contact group, an estimated 8,000 people took part in a Southern Movement protest in Lawdar. A secessionist source said many of the protestors were carrying firearms because the army "threatened to crush the demonstration." A statement from the protestors communicated solidarity with the residents of al-Hawtah amidst the army offensive and called on the international community and Friends of Yemen to "intervene to resolve the south Yemen issue."

==== Other ====
Ali Dahmas, a local leader of the Joint Meeting Parties, a coalition of opposition parties, said a large-scale operation was unnecessary to neutralize the AQAP threat in Lawdar because the perpetrators of the original ambush could have been easily arrested by a small contingent of soldiers. He also criticized shelling of civilian homes during the operation and said that it had further inflamed tensions in the area.

== Analysis ==
In an analysis of the operation for Monte Carlo Doualiya, Lebanese journalist Abdul Wahab Badrakhan suggested Lawdar's strategic significance amounted to it being a crossroad for AQAP members travelling through Abyan, Shabwah and Marib governorates, but also for it allegedly being the site of burgeoning cooperation between AQAP and the Southern Movement, which the government sought to neutralize before it grew to a further extent. He also claimed that the offensive was meant to showcase the government's dedication to counterterrorism to its foreign funders. According to Intelligence Online, intelligence agencies of the Gulf Arab states believed that tribes affiliated with the Southern Movement aided AQAP during the siege.

Observers regarded the battle as the first major military confrontation between AQAP and the Yemeni government. It was noted that previous RPG ambushes and assassinations perpetrated by AQAP did not elicit such a strong response from the government. Intelligence firm Stratfor questioned whether the government had already intended for an operation in Lawdar prior to the 19–20 August killings, and that the latter had "provided the military with the impetus to attack."

Comparisons were drawn between the similarities of the operations in Lawdar and al-Hawtah. Despite their operation success, the majority of AQAP forces had managed to escape from Lawdar and al-Hawtah into the countryside, including the primary targets of the sieges which rendered both of them failures according to investigative journalist Jeremy Scahill. Der Spiegel said the US intelligence community believed the two operations were a "sham." The Sunday Times wrote:

One of the biggest problems for the US when it comes to Yemen is encapsulated in the story of the Lawdar siege: few people appear to know what exactly is going on there or who al-Qaeda really are — an intelligence gap that carries huge risks for operations against them.

In a 2013 report reflecting on the history of al-Qaeda in Yemen, W. Andrew Terrill of the Strategic Studies Institute regarded the battle as a notable event in AQAP's development into an insurgent force rather strictly a terrorist organization. According to him, the fact that AQAP did not immediately retreat from Lawdar during the operation "indicated a level of commitment to their cause, as well as perhaps some degree of contempt for the quality of Yemeni military forces." He attributed low militant casualties in the battle to reluctance from AQAP in dedicating significant resources to hold Lawdar.

== See also ==
- Battle of Lawdar (2012)
