= Popular Committees (Yemen) =

Armed groups founded by Yemeni tribes

The Popular Committees (Arabic: اللجان الشعبية), also known as the People's Committees, are armed groups formed by Yemeni tribes on behalf of more professional armed forces.

== Overview ==
The Middle East Institute describes Popular Committees as "an indigenous movement whose mandate and function are rooted in and inspired by the tribal tradition of collective responsibility in which local men volunteer to maintain security in their communities." Many Popular Committees area affiliated with local political parties and movements including the Houthis, the Southern Movement (Hirak), the Islah party, the Yemeni Socialist Party and the ruling-General People's Congress. Within the context of the civil war, Popular Committees can be divided between those supporting the Houthi government and those supporting the internationally-recognized government, and have been utilized in offensive maneuvers and operations rather than just defending their communities.

The Yemeni army has required the support of tribal militias or what have become known as People's Committees in internal and external wars. When the 1962 revolution in northern Yemen did not receive military support from the United Kingdom, some troops allied with the deposed Imams to regain power. Tribal links weakened, especially in Taiz and Ibb; members received a monthly salary, wore military uniforms and underwent military training.

During the presidency of Abdul Rahman al-Iryani (1967–1974) the military battled over policy, beginning with a conflict over the establishment of the National Council. The "popular committees" further polarized the country.

During the 1980s Ali Abdullah Saleh reemphasized tribal affairs, in contrast with assassinated president Ibrahim al-Hamdi. His government clashed with the Houthis in Saada and 'Amran Governorates from 2004 to 2009, and the popular committees were used to a regional al-Qaeda's insurgency.

In course of the Yemeni Revolution, more and more self-defense groups or popular committees sprung up around the country. One of these was led by warlord Abdullatif Al-Sayed who initially fought against President Saleh's government and with al-Qaeda in the Arabian Peninsula (AQAP), but later sided with the new government of Abdrabbuh Mansur Hadi. He reorganized his forces as auxiliaries for the army and supported Hadi in the later Yemeni Civil War. By 2015, popular committees had spread to other provinces of Yemen, and played a major role in the Battle of Aden (2015) against the Houthis.

By 2018, the Houthi rebels had also started to organize their own "popular committees".

By 2022, Popular Committees in Taiz were asking for donations from locals.

== Government-aligned groups ==
Groups allied to the internationally-recognized government of Yemen (the Presidential Leadership Council since 2022) are typically referred to as the Popular Resistance (PR) or Popular Resistance Committees (PRC) in the context of the civil war, but are synonymous with Popular Committees.

=== History ===
In the aftermath of the May 2011 takeover of Zinjibar, the capital of Abyan Governorate, several Popular Committees were formed to protect other communities against al-Qaeda in the Arabian Peninsula's newly formed local front, Ansar al-Sharia. Abdullatif al-Sayid was the leader of Popular Committees operating in Khanfar and Zinjibar districts during the conflict. Sayid joined Ansar al-Sharia during its capture of Jaar, the capital of Khanfar district, in March 2011, but eventually defected from the group after witnessing its brutal governing and the execution of his cousin. Sayid began clandestinely recruiting tribesmen in Jaar to fight the militants until August 2011, when they fled after Ansar al-Sharia attacked his house. From thereon, his forces were based in the remote mountains of Abyan, waging a guerilla conflict against Ansar al-Sharia which disrupted the group's supply lines and movement while looting their supplies. His campaign eventually attracted the support of tribes and volunteers in the area.

In early April 2012, tribesmen from Popular Committees were instrumental in the defense of Lawdar, another city in Abyan, as Ansar al-Sharia attempted to capture it. The initiative, which was conducted by locals without any formal military training, prevented Ansar al-Sharia from further expanding its territory in the governorate. Soon after, the Yemeni government began directing more supplies to the Popular Committees in Lawdar, and increased its lobbying of tribal and religious figures in Abyan to further proliferate them across the governorate.

The Popular Committees joined an offensive launched by the Yemeni military in May 2012 to uproot Ansar al-Sharia from Abyan, reportedly at a request from Defense Minister Muhammad Nasser Ahmed to Sayid in the case of the Khanfar and Zinjibar groups. In Lawdar, Popular Committees were joined by security forces in driving Ansar al-Sharia out of the city completely later in the month. The victory encouraged civilians from other areas in Abyan, as well as displaced refugees, to form and volunteer in Popular Committees in their own cities, leading to numerous groups forming in Abyan throughout the next months. Sayid's forces were critical in helping the Yemeni Army drive out Ansar al-Sharia from Jaar and ending the year-long Battle of Zinjibar in June 2012, their success being attributed to "using their local knowledge and warfare tactics." According to Sayid, the Popular Committees lost 500 fighters to the overall conflict.

After the withdrawal of Ansar al-Sharia, the Popular Committees took the role of law enforcement in their local areas in expectation for the government to replace them, however as of March 2014 the fighters were still administering the areas.

=== Allegiances ===
Popular Committees are often driven by and affiliated with a wide variety of actors who share common enemies with the government, such as AQAP and the Houthis. These actors include tribes, political parties such as Islah, anti-Houthi factions of the Yemeni Socialist Party and the General People's Congress, and religious sects such as Sunnis and Salafis.

== See also ==
- Abdrabbuh Mansur Hadi
- Popular Resistance Committees (Yemen)
