= Battle of Jaar (2011) =

Ansar al-Sharia capture of city in Yemen

- Part of the al-Qaeda insurgency in Yemen, the Yemeni revolution and the Yemeni crisis
Date	26–28 March 2011 (2 days)
Location	Jaar, Abyan Governorate, Yemen 13.223056°N 45.305556°E
Result	Ansar al-Sharia victory: Ansar al-Sharia captures Jaar and the surrounding areas; Militants seize military equipment

Belligerents
Yemen	Al-Qaeda; Al-Qaeda in the Arabian Peninsula

Units involved
Yemeni Armed Forces; (Yemen) Yemeni Land Forces	Ansar al-Sharia

Casualties and losses
1 killed	1 wounded
- 150 civilians killed, 80 injured (see Jaʽār munitions factory explosion)

On 26 March 2011, gunmen from the al-Qaeda in the Arabian Peninsula-linked militant group Ansar al-Sharia raided the city of Jaar in Abyan Governorate, Yemen. After security forces mounted a brief counteroffensive on 27 March, they abandoned the city and allowed the militants to capture it and its surrounding areas by the next day.

== Background ==
Jaar possesses significant heritage as a bastion for Islamism since the unification of Yemen in 1990. After the defeat of the southern secessionists in the 1994 civil war, Islamists were encouraged by the government to take control of the once socialist areas. Quranic centers were established as bases for radicalization with support from the Yemeni and Saudi Arabian governments. Veterans of the Afghan mujahideen used Jaar as bases for expanding local jihadist groups such as Islamic Jihad in Yemen and the Aden-Abyan Islamic Army during the 1990s. Insurgents from the Iraq War and the US-led War in Afghanistan also made their way into Jaar, while the town was being used as a training ground for Saudi militants heading to Iraq until a government crackdown in 2006. From there on, relations between the Islamists and the government deteriorated into frequent fighting, with jihadists controlling the town until a 2009 government offensive.

Beginning in January 2011, the Yemeni revolution caused widespread unrest across the country as protestors called for the resignation of longtime president Ali Abdullah Saleh. The revolution was further intensified after an incident on 18 March in which pro-government forces opened fire on protestors in the capital of Sanaa. In response to the incident, the government repositioned military units from other parts of the country into Sanaa and its surrounding areas. These areas included Abyan Governorate, with the American-trained Counter-Terrorism Unit specifically created to fight al-Qaeda being sent away along with the army. Some security forces were also pushed out their respective towns by locals who began creating committees to run their own communities.

The city of Jaar is positioned near a mountain range used as a sanctuary by al-Qaeda in the Arabian Peninsula. AQAP had previously seized control of towns in southern Yemen, but security forces were quick to counterattack and resecure the areas. As the government was primarily occupied with putting down the revolution, the militants faced little challenge in capturing territory.

== Capture ==
On 26 March, Islamist militants descended from a nearby expanse of mountains into Jaar, spreading out across the city while setting up checkpoints at its entrance and seizing vacant government buildings. The raid on Jaar came with little fighting at first as local police and security forces had abandoned it weeks prior. Security forces launched a counterattack on the militants on 27 March in clashes which left one soldier dead and one militant seriously injured. Yemeni warplanes were reported to have flew over the area, though this was later denied by an official. The counteroffensive failed as the army soon withdrew from the city towards Abyan's capital Zinjibar. Later in the day, army artillery shelling was reported to have struck the town.

With security forces deserting the area, the militants took control of Jaar's government buildings, including the local police station and military barracks, as well as the Khanfar Mountain overlooking the city which held a radio station and a presidential guest house overtop it. A statement reportedly signed by the militants said that they would let soldiers in the barracks go free if they abandoned their weapons. A security official later claimed that there was little to no fighting in the city as the army had opened its barracks to the militants after negotiations.

Five checkpoints were set up at the entrance to Jaar. The militants also took control of the nearby town of al-Husn as well as the 7 October Munitions Factory and its adjoining warehouse about three miles west of Jaar in the town of Batis. An employee at the factory stated that the militants seized two armored cars, a tank, several pickup trucks mounted with machine guns and ammunition, and transported looted cases of weapons with four vehicles.

By the morning of 28 March, the militants were in firm control of Jaar as gunmen referring to themselves as Ansar al-Sharia had set up checkpoints and hung their flag across the city. The group claimed to be affiliated with al-Qaeda. Hundreds of militants were seen roaming the city's streets in captured armored vehicles, military vehicles, and machine guns. They had also left the munitions factory.

=== Munitions factory explosion ===
After the militants left the munitions factory, dozens of men, women and children, entered the factory in search of valuables they could loot, including cables, doors and vehicle fuel. While they were inside, an accidental explosion occurred in the facility, possibly caused by a lit cigarette interacting with gunpowder or a gun used to open a room full of dynamite. The explosion killed 150 people and injured 80. A government-affiliated newspaper claimed that the explosion was a trap intentionally set by the militants, whom they labeled as al-Qaeda.

== Reactions ==
Abyan deputy governor Saleh al-Zoary blamed the federal government for the factory explosion as they had ordered the withdrawal of security forces which created the disorder. The Joint Meeting Parties, a coalition of anti-Saleh opposition parties, released a statement claiming that the explosion was facilitated as "a desperate attempt of President Saleh to confirm his argument that Yemen is just a ticking time bomb." In response to US Defense Secretary Robert Gates saying that the deposition of Saleh could lead to a "real problem" for the US, JMP spokesperson Mohammed al-Sabri said "The remarks are clear indications that the U.S. administration stands by Saleh who gave al-Qaida elements a green light to create chaos in the south to scare the Americans."

== Analysis ==
Jaar became Ansar al-Sharia's de facto administrative capitol in Abyan for the next years. The city was "carefully selected" as the center of the group's Islamic emirate for multiple reasons. In terms of its strategic value, the city was located on the foot of the al-Habilayn mountains, a remote and rugged terrain to which militants had previously retreated in the face of army advances. Zinjibar, the official capital of Abyan Governorate, was located 30 kilometers south of Jaar, while Zinjibar lied upon the only road connection Abyan to Aden. The only other road to Jaar was hundreds of kilometers long and wound through the remote mountains and desert to the north. These factors gave Jaar "strategic cover from which to plan and launch attacks" such as a March 2012 raid on military units stationed near Zinjiabr.

Compared to other areas such as Shabwah Governorate, Jaar had a very weak tribal structure, which allowed Ansar al-Sharia to capture the town without confronting the local tribes. Jaar also acted as a barrier to prevent the reach of powerful anti-al-Qaeda tribes to the rest of Abyan, particularly the Southern Movement-aligned Yafa tribe which occupies territory north of Jaar.

== See also ==
- Battle of Lawdar (2012)
- Battle of Mukalla (2015)
- Fall of Zinjibar and Jaar (2015)
