= Ansar al-Sharia (Yemen) =

Militant Jihadist organization in Yemen

جماعة أنصار الشريعة (Jamāʿat Anṣār aš-Šharīʿa) Partisans of Shari'a
- Logo
- Leaders: Nasir al-Wuhayshi † (2009–2015); Qasim al-Raymi † (2015–20); Khalid Batarfi # (2020–2024); Sa'ad bin Atef al-Awlaki (2024–present)
- Dates active: 2011–present
- Headquarters: Mukalla, Hadhramaut (2015–2016)
- Active regions: Yemen; the governorates of Bayda, Shabwah, Ma'rib, Abyan, Hadramawt, Aden and Lahij.
- Ideology: Pan-Islamism; Sunni Islamism; Jihadism; Qutbism; Islamic nationalism; Populism; Anti-Zionism
- Status: Active
- Size: Approximately 7,000 (2020)
- Part of: al-Qaeda in the Arabian Peninsula
- Wars: the Yemeni Revolution, War on Terror, Yemeni Civil War, and the Operation Inherent Resolve

Jama'at Ansar al-Shari'a (Arabic: جماعة أنصار الشريعة; Jamāʿat Anṣār aš-Šharīʿa), also known as Ansar al-Shari'a, is a Yemen-based umbrella organization which includes units from several militant Islamic groups of al-Qaeda in the Arabian Peninsula (AQAP).

== History ==
In 2011, AQAP created Ansar Al-Sharia as a Yemen-based affiliate focused on waging an insurgency rather than international attacks on the West. In the view of the International Crisis Group, AQAP is "an internally diverse organisation with varying layers of support among the local population" and many AAS members and allies are not committed to AQAP's international agenda.

After the Battle of Zinjibar (May–September 2011), the faction had taken control of some cities in southern Yemen in which it has instated emirates. Ansar ash-Shari'a have also claimed responsibility for the 2012 Sana'a bombing and the 2013 Sana'a attack.

On 4 October 2012, the United States Department of State amended its list of Foreign Terrorist Organizations to designate Ansar al-Sharia in Yemen as an alias for al-Qaeda in the Arabian Peninsula, rather than listing it as a separate organisation. On the same day, the group was also listed by the United Nations 1267/1989 Al-Qaida Sanctions Committee. New Zealand also listed it as a terror group.

In February 2015, it was reported that some members had split from the group and pledged allegiance to the Islamic State.

In 2017, AQAP and AAS were in a struggle for territorial control with both Houthi and Saleh forces in the governorates of al-Bayda, Shebwa, Marib, Jawf and Taiz.

In January 2020, the group's leader Qasim al-Raymi, who also served as the leader of Al Qaeda in Arabian Peninsula, was killed in a U.S. airstrike.
