= Al-Qaeda insurgency in Yemen =

Insurgency in Yemen by Al-Qaeda

- Part of the war on terror and the Yemeni Civil War
- Political and military control in Yemen in September 2026: Republic of Yemen (recognized by United Nations), pro-PLC Yemeni Armed Forces and General People's Congress Supreme Political Council, pro-SPC Yemeni Armed Forces, Houthi movement Al-Qaeda in the Arabian Peninsula (AQAP) (For a detailed map of the military situation in Yemen and border areas in Saudi Arabia, see here.)
Date	30 December 1998 – present (27 years, 10 months, 3 weeks and 2 days)
Location	Yemen
Result	Al-Qaeda largely defeated but still active: Escalation into crisis and civil war; Yemeni Crisis begins in late January 2011.

Belligerents
Al-Qaeda; AQAP; Ansar al-Sharia; Islamic Emirate of Yemen; Council of Sunni Scholars and al-Jama'a; Hadrami Domestic Council faction; al-Dhahab tribesmen; Aden-Abyan Islamic Army (1996–2009)	Government of Yemen (internationally recognized; led by the Presidential Leadership Council since 2022); Yemeni Armed Forces; Yemeni Army; YRG; GPC (anti-Houthi); STC (2022–2025) (Note: from April 2022 to December 2025, the Southern Transitional Council was part of the Yemeni government led by the Presidential Leadership Council. Multiple sources: Salem, Mostafa; Kolirin, Lianne (7 April 2022). "Hopes of peace in Yemen as President hands power to new presidential council". CNN. Archived from the original on 8 April 2022.; Ghobari, Mohamed (7 April 2022). "Yemen president sacks deputy, delegates presidential powers to council". Reuters. Aden. Archived from the original on 1 May 2022.; Al-Sakani, Ali (19 April 2022). "Yemen inaugurates new presidential council". Al Jazeera. Archived from the original on 1 March 2023.); United Arab Emirates; National Resistance (since 2017); Tihamah Resistance; Giants Brigades; Hadhramaut Tribal Alliance; Al-Islah; Bani Dhabyan; Saleh loyalists (since 2017); Popular Resistance; Popular Committees; Saudi-led coalition: Saudi Arabia; United Arab Emirates; Sudan; Senegal; Morocco (2015–19); Qatar (2015–17); Bahrain; Academi security guards (2015–16); STC (2017–2022); United Arab Emirates	Supreme Political Council (since 2016); Houthis; GPC (pro-Houthi); Saleh loyalists (until 2017); Pro-Houthi Popular Committees; Sanaa-GPC forces; Supreme Revolutionary Committee (until 2016)	Islamic State – Yemen Province (until 2022)

Commanders and leaders
Sa'ad bin Atef al-Awlaki; Ammar al-San’ani; Ibrahim al-Banna; Abdullah Mubarak; Ibrahim al Qosi; Casualties: Khalid Batarfi💀; Nasir al-Wuhayshi †; Qasim al-Raymi †; Nasser al-Ansi †; Ali Abed al-Rab bin Talab †; Helmi Al Zinji (POW); Abdul Rauf al-Dhahab †; Sultan al-Dhahab †; Abu Ali Al-Disi †; Saleh Al-Dayouli †; Ayyub al-Lahji †; Seif al-Joufi †; Abu Barazan †; Ibrahim al-Rubaish †	(Yemen) Rashad al-Alimi (since 2022); Aidarus al-Zoubaidi (2022–26); (Yemen) Mohsen al-Daeri (since 2022); (Yemen) Abdrabbuh Mansour Hadi (2014–22); (Yemen) Mohammed al-Maqdashi (2018–22); (Yemen) Mahmoud al-Subaihi (2014–18); (Yemen) Mohammed Nasser Ahmed (2014); Ahmed Saleh (since 2017); Tareq Saleh (since 2017); Saudi-led coalition: Salman; Mohammed bin Salman; Khalifa bin Zayed #; Mohamed bin Zayed; Abdel Fattah Burhan; Macky Sall; Mohamed VI (2015–19); Tamim bin Hamad (2015–17)	(Houthis) Abdul-Malik al-Houthi (since 2004); (Houthis) Mohammed al-Houthi (since 2015); (Houthis) Mahdi al-Mashat (since 2018); (Houthis) Saleh Ali al-Sammad X (2016–18); (Houthis) Mohamed al-Atifi (since 2016); (Houthis) Hussein Khairan (2015–16); Sadeq Rass (since 2018); Ali Saleh X (2014–17)	(Islamic State) Abu Osama al-Muhajer (POW) (2017–19) (Islamic State) Abu Bilal al-Harbi † (2014–17)

Strength
al-Qaeda; Ansar al-Sharia: 6,000–8,000	113,500 soldiers and paramilitary; 100 warplanes; 150,000 troops; 30 warplanes; 10,000 troops; 15 warplanes; 300 troops; 10 warplanes; 1,000 troops; 6 warplanes; 6 warplanes; 1,500 troops; 4 warplanes; 8,000–30,000 troops; 2,100 troops; 4 warships and warplanes; 1,800 security contractors	150,000–200,000 fighters	ISIL: 300 (June 2015); 500 (2018); 250 (2023); 100 (2025)

Casualties and losses
AQAP: Thousands killed, Arrested, captured, or surrendered	(Yemen) Unknown; 1,000–3,000; Saudi losses: 10 captured; 5 aircraft lost; 8 helicopters lost 9 drones lost 20 M1A2s lost 1 frigate damaged; (United Arab Emirates) 108 soldiers killed; Emirati losses: 2 aircraft lost 3 helicopters lost 1 minesweeper damaged 6 drones lost 1 watercraft damaged; (Sudan) 1,000–4,000 soldiers killed; (Bahrain) 11 soldiers killed; 1 F-16 crashed; (Qatar) 4 soldiers killed; (Morocco) 10 servicemen killed; 1 F-16 shot down; (Jordan) 1 F-16 lost; 71 PMCs killed; (United States) 1 killed, 3 injured (2017); American losses: 4 drones shot down 1 helicopter lost 1 tiltrotor craft lost; (Belarus) 2 killed (2013)	Thousands killed, arrested, captured, or surrendered; Unknown	
- 39 civilians killed (2010); 85 civilians killed (2011)

The Al-Qaeda insurgency in Yemen is an ongoing armed conflict between the Yemeni government, the United States and their allies, and al-Qaeda-affiliated groups in Yemen. It was formerly a part of the Global War on Terrorism.

Government crackdown against al-Qaeda cells began in 2001, escalating steadily until 14 January 2010, when Yemen declared open war on al-Qaeda. In addition to battling al-Qaeda across several provinces, Yemen was forced to contend with a Shia insurgency in the north and militant separatists in the south. Fighting with al-Qaeda escalated further during the course of the 2011 Yemeni revolution, with Jihadists seizing most of the Abyan Governorate and declaring it an Emirate. A second wave of violence began in early 2012, with militants claiming territory across the southwest amid heavy combat with government forces.

On 16 September 2014, a full-scale civil war erupted after Houthi fighters stormed Sana'a and ousted interim President Hadi, fracturing the Yemeni government between the UN recognized government of President Hadi and the Houthis' newly formed Supreme Political Council. The full-scale civil war led to a rise of Islamist groups (Al-Qaeda, ISIS), insurgencies (Houthis), and call for separation of South Yemen.

== Background ==
Since 2002 or before, Yemen came under pressure to act against al-Qaeda from the United States (and Saudi Arabia). This was because attacks on both were often conducted by militants based in Yemen.

Al-Qaeda had also had a long history of operation in Yemen. The bin Laden family originated from Hadhramaut and so Osama bin Laden had strong attachments to the country. Bin Laden recruited many Afghan Arabs to fight in the Soviet–Afghan War from North Yemen. After the war he made an offer to send al-Qaeda to overthrow the Communist government of South Yemen but Prince Turki bin Faisal turned him down. Bin Laden was upset when Saudi Arabia and the United States soon afterwards accepted a Yemeni unification agreement in which the Yemen Socialist Party leaders would continue to serve in the government. He responded by committing assassinations of YSP leaders which destabilized the country. Yemeni President Ali Abdullah Saleh complained to King Fahd about al-Qaeda's operations, and Prince Nayef bin Abdulaziz rebuked bin Laden and confiscated his Saudi passport. In the 1990s North Yemeni Soviet-Afghan War veterans formed the al-Qaeda-aligned Aden-Abyan Islamic Army.

Previous attacks linked to al-Qaeda in Yemen include the 2000 bombing of the USS Cole, the 2008 American Embassy attack, and several other attacks against foreign tourists.

Yemen had intensified operations against al-Qaeda in late 2009, when a Yemen-based wing of the group claimed to be behind the failed 25 December 2009 attempt to blow up a Detroit-bound U.S. airliner, itself a retaliation against an attack against a training camp in Abyan on 17 December, resulting in the deaths of multiple civilians. News reports have indicated substantial American involvement in support of Yemeni operations against al-Qaeda since late 2009, including training, intelligence sharing, "several dozen troops" from the Joint Special Operations Command, and limited direct involvement in counter-terrorism operations.

== Timeline ==
The United States sought to counter Al-Qaeda in the Arabian Peninsula (AQAP) through a campaign of airstrikes that began in late 2009. Drone attacks were flown bases outside Yemen by Joint Special Operations Command and the CIA. Many of these attacks were launched from Djibouti - Camp Lemonnier/Djibouti International Airport.

=== 2009 ===
On 15 March, 4 South Korean tourists were killed in Shibam, Hadhramaut by a suicide bomber. The Yemeni government blamed AQAP for the attack, as well as one on a South Korean delegation on 18 March that killed only the perpetrator.

On 17 December, the U.S. carried out air raids on what officials suspected was an AQAP training camp in al-Majalah, a village in Abyan governorate. The attacks reportedly killed 50 people, including women and children, and injured 60 more according to locals. Yemeni and U.S. officials both distanced themselves from the attack in the aftermath. A Yemeni inquiry into the raid uncovered that the attacks ultimately killed 55 people; 14 AQAP fighters and 41 civilians.

On 24 December, a U.S. airstrike in Shabwah governorate reportedly killed over 30 AQAP members.

=== 2010 ===
On 6 January, Yemeni forces arrest three AQAP members in Sana'a who were wounded in a raid carried out two days before.

On 13 January, Yemeni security forces battled AQAP in Habban district, Shabwah governorate. Yemeni forces had surrounded the residence of AQAP cell leader Abdullah Mehdar, leading to clashes within the district. AQAP fighters ambushed an army unit travelling on a nearby road in order to divert attention from Medhar, killing 2 soldiers. Medhar was eventually killed in the battle, while 4 AQAP members were arrested.

On 14 January, Yemeni airstrikes targeted AQAP vehicles travelling between Saada and al-Jawf governorate, reportedly killing 6 senior leaders. AQAP later denied any of their deaths.

On 8 February, AQAP deputy leader Said Ali al-Shihri called for a regional holy war and blockade of the Red Sea to prevent shipments to Israel. In an audiotape announcement he called upon Somali militant group al-Shabaab for assistance in the blockade.

On 26 April, an AQAP suicide bomber attempted to assassinate the UK ambassador to Yemen, Timothy Torlot, in Sana'a. Torlot was unhurt, but 3 others were injured in the attack. AQAP attempted again to kill a British diplomat, Fionna Gibb, in Sana'a on 6 October. An AQAP member fired a rocket-propelled grenade at her vehicle, injuring an embassy worker and 3 bystanders. Gibb was unharmed.

==== First Battle of Lawdar ====
The Yemeni government launched an offensive on 19 August to secure the town of Lawdar, Abyan, which was an AQAP stronghold. The government announced on 25 August that they recaptured the town, reportedly killing 12 to 19 AQAP fighters and losing 11 soldiers.

==== Battle of Huta ====
Battle of Huta
Date	20–24 September 2010
Location	Huta (Shabwa)
Status	Yemeni victory
Territorial changes	Yemen regains the town

Belligerents
Yemen	al-Qaeda in the Arabian Peninsula

Strength
	300

Casualties and losses
~4 killed, 9 wounded	5 killed, 5 wounded, 32 captured
- 15,000 Yemeni civilians flee, at least 3 wounded

On 20 September, the Yemeni government ensigned the town of Huta, Shabwah, where 80 to 100 AQAP militants were reportedly in control. In the initial assault, 3 AQAP members and 2 soldiers were reported to have been killed. On 22 September, 4 people were killed with another 3 injured during clashes in the town. The same day, Yemeni forces detained more than 20 gunmen presumed to be members of AQAP. The Yemeni government ended the siege on 24 September, with 5 AQAP members killed and 32 detained in total.

On 24 November 2010, an AQAP suicide bomber attacked a Houthi convoy celebrating the day of Ghadir in al-Matun district, al-Jawf, killing 17 people and injuring 30 others. On 26 November, AQAP bombed a convoy in Sahar district, Saada, heading to the funeral of Badreddin al-Houthi, killing one person and injuring eight.

=== 2011 ===
On 7 January, 12 soldiers were killed in an AQAP ambush in Lawdar, Abyan. The next day, AQAP fighters attacked a military checkpoint in Lahij governorate, killing 4 soldiers.

On 6 March, AQAP claimed responsibility for two attacks which killed 5 Yemeni soldiers altogether. 4 soldiers, part of the Republican Guard, were killed in an ambush on a convoy in Marib governorate, while an army colonel was shot and killed in Zinjibar, Abyan.

AQAP took advantage of the chaos caused by the Yemeni revolution to seize significant territory in the southern Abyan governorate. On 28 March, AQAP seized the town of Jaʽār, Abyan after army forces withdrew from the city after clashing with the militants over the weekend. The next day, a massive explosion in a weapons factory near the town killed 150 people. On 25 March, 3 AQAP militants were killed by security forces in Lawdar. On 26 March, 5 AQAP fighters died after attacking a military checkpoint in Lawdar. On 31 March, AQAP declared an "Islamic Emirate" in Abyan, reportedly seizing most of the governorate by the time of their announcement.

On 13 May, an AQAP ambush on a Yemeni army convoy in Marib left at least 5 soldiers dead. The attacker had fired an RPG at the convoy.

==== Battle of Zinjibar ====
On 27 May, Ansar al-Sharia, an organization commonly understood to be an affiliate or direct extension of AQAP, captured the capital of Abyan governorate, Zinjibar. More than 200 militants seized the town, killing 16 soldiers and freeing dozens of prisoners. Ansar al-Sharia entrenched itself into the city in the following days, repelling attempts by the military to enter the city on 31 May and on 7 June, and forcing 2 brigades to retreat on 21 June. Multiple tribes changed their allegiance from the militants to the military as fighting raged on in Abyan and more civilians were displaced. The Yemeni army along with allied tribes launched an offensive on July 17 attacking the city from the west. On 22 July, the army established control over a sports stadium near Zinjibar and waged fighting near the entrance of the city, while allied tribes secured a main highway leading to the city. Though the city was declared to be retaken by the government on 10 September, the government only controlled the eastern portion while Ansar al-Sharia still controlled the west. A deal was reached on 12 January 2012 to allow residents to return.

A prison break in Mukalla occurred in mid-June, freeing 63 AQAP prisoners and killing a guard. The prison was attacked by militants with artillery, allowing the inmates to escape through a 35-metre long tunnel.

On 10 August, AQAP seized the port town of Shuqrah, Abyan, quickly driving out local tribesman with a group of no more than 50 militants. The group had also seized government equipment and artillery.

On 30 September, American-Yemeni cleric and alleged AQAP member Anwar al-Awlaki was killed in a U.S. drone strike in the town of Khashef, al-Jawf governorate, while travelling in a vehicle. Awlaki was previously the target of a drone strike on 5 May, though he evaded the attack which instead killed 2 AQAP members in their car. The U.S. government placed Awlaki on a CIA kill list and froze his assets a year before, accusing him of inciting and directing multiple terror plots in the United States, including the 2009 Fort Hood shooting and the attempted bombing of Northwest Airlines Flight 253. The attack had also killed Samir Khan, an American citizen from Saudi Arabia who, along with Awlaki, was an editor and publisher of AQAP's magazine, Inspire.

On 12 December a prison break in Aden freed up to 15 AQAP members. The prisoners had escaped via a 40-metre long tunnel.

=== 2012 ===
On 16 January, AQAP seized the town of Rada'a, Al-Bayda, just 100 miles south of Sana'a. A group of 200 fighters had stormed the town, freed at least 150 prisoners, killed 2 soldiers in clashes with the army and secured multiple weapons caches and military vehicles. With mounting tribal pressure, the group withdrew from Rada'a on 25 January after they reached an agreement with the government to release 15 of their fighters.

Situation in Yemen in October 2011.

==== Battle of Dofas ====
On 4 March, Ansar al-Sharia launched an attack on military artillery units in Dofas, a town located on the outskirts of Zinjibar. Fighters had attacked the base from the east to draw a response from the army before launching a larger attack from the west. The battle killed 187 soldiers and injured at least 135, with the militants seizing weapons, heavy artillery and tanks from the military.

On 13 March an AQAP suicide bombing near al-Bayda that killed four soldiers and left four others critically injured. After this attack militants posted a video in which they announced the capture of yet another soldier, bringing the total number of prisoners they hold to 74. They demanded an agreement to free imprisoned insurgents in exchange for the soldiers.

On 31 March, a large group of AQAP fighters attacked an army checkpoint in Lahij governorate during the night, sparking a battle that left 20 soldiers and 4 insurgents dead. The attackers fled with heavy weapons and at least two tanks. Government forces later called in airstrikes that successfully destroyed one of the captured tanks, killing its three occupants.

Situation in March 2012

==== Second Battle of Lawdar ====
Second Battle of Lawdar
Date	9 April – 16 May 2012
Location	Lawdar (Abyan Governorate)
Status	Yemeni victory: AQAP and Ansar Al Sharia driven away from Lawdar.

Belligerents
Yemen: Republic of Yemen Armed Forces; Tribal fighters	Al-Qaeda in the Arabian Peninsula; Ansar al-Sharia

Commanders and leaders
Pres. Abdrabbuh Mansur Hadi; Brig. Gen. Muhammad Nasir Ahmad Ali; Saleh al-Ahmar	Nasir al-Wuhayshi

Strength
Unknown	Al-Qaeda : 500–600; Ansar al-Sharia : unknown

Casualties and losses
33 soldiers and 60 tribal fighters killed, 580 fighters wounded overall	249 killed
- 32 civilians and tribal militia members killed

On 9 April, a large group of AQAP militants attacked a military base near the city of Lawdar, briefly overrunning it before locals joined the military to push them out. At least 94 people were killed in that initial attack, including six civilians, 74 AQAP fighters, and 14 soldiers. This was the third such assault in recent weeks, after two similar attacks in March left at least 130 soldiers dead and more than 70 as prisoners of al-Qaeda affiliated groups.

Government sources raised the casualty figures on 10 April to 124 deaths; 102 militants, 14 soldiers, and at least eight civilians. Local tribal sources confirmed the toll, adding that among the dead insurgents there were at least 12 Somalis and several Saudis. Reinforcements were being brought into the area as airstrikes began attacking AQAP positions near Lawdar and on the main road towards Zinjibar. At least 51 deaths were recorded on 11 April, raising the total death toll to over 200. These included 42 militants, six soldiers and three local militia members. The government reportedly sent an elite anti-terrorism squad to help in defeating the militants.

By 13 April the battle was still raging around the city with clashes spreading to nearby Mudiyah, the only other town apart from Lawdar that AQAP did not control in Abyan. Mortar shelling was reported for the second consecutive day by local citizens, with at least 17 civilians injured and the main power station reportedly on fire. After the government sent an additional 200 soldiers, AQAP pulled out of the city and towards the nearby villages of Um Sorra and Wadhia, leaving a few snipers behind. The official death toll by the end of the day stood at 37, including 31 militants, five members of a tribal civilian militia, and a child that was shot by an unidentified sniper. Authorities reported the city to be relatively quiet on April 14, with only sporadic gunfire breaking the silence. On 15 April, a suicide bomber killed two tribal militia members at a checkpoint in al-Hodn, just outside Lawdar. Six militants and two locals were killed in other clashes around the town, specifically in an area called al-Minyasa.

Fighting resumed on 18 April 2012, with AQAP shelling the city and government forces ordering airstrikes in retaliation. Two children were killed and at least five houses were destroyed during the mortar attacks, while six militants were confirmed dead in the airstrikes. The previous day a suicide car bomber had attacked an army checkpoint on the outskirts of Lawdar, killing five Yemeni soldiers and injuring four more. On 19 April at least 7 AQAP fighters were killed in clashes with an army unit based in Lawdar. On 21 April, Yemeni airplanes bombed AQAP positions in the nearby Yasouf and al-Minyasa mountains, killing at least 13 militants. On 23 April, 15 AQAP fighters were killed in an ambush on their convoy. The same day, airstrikes targeting a vehicle and two hideouts near Lawdar killed 15 suspected AQAP members. On 25 April at least six AQAP militants were killed after their convoy was ambushed by local militia members. Fighting around the city on 30 April killed 12 AQAP militants, a soldier and a tribal militia member. By 16 May, Yemeni troops backed pro-government tribal militias captured the Yasouf mountain, a strategic force above the city, after heavy fighting. After doing so, it was announced that the militants had fled Lawder.

On 14 April, AQAP fighters attacked a security checkpoint near Aden, killing 5 soldiers and 8 militants.

On 19 April at least 6 AQAP militants and two Yemeni soldiers were killed in a shootout in Zinjibar. On 23 April, clashes in Zinjibar killed three AQAP fighters.

On 24 April, a U.S. drone strike in Marib killed AQAP commander Mohammed Saeed al-Umda while he was travelling in a convoy.

==== Abyan offensive ====
The Yemeni government launched an offensive in Abyan on 11 May in order to drive out AQAP forces from key cities. On 14 May, heavy fighting occurred near Jaʽār which carried over into the next day, killing 8 AQAP fighters and a Yemeni soldier. On 15 May, airstrikes on vehicles in Jaʽār killed 7 supposed militants and three others in a house, with at least 44 people. including 30 militants being killed during the day. Over 20 and 21 May, 33 AQAP fighters and 19 soldiers would be killed from clashes in Jaʽār. On 24 May, AQAP launched a counter-attack on the army in Jaʽār through the Wadi Bana. The attack resulted in the deaths of 35 of their fighters, bringing the total count to 215. Yemeni forces then proceeded to take control of Wadi Bana. By 3 June, Yemeni forces had pushed into central Zinjibar, while clashes were occurring near the western edge of Jaʽār. On 11 June the Yemeni Air Force launched attacks on the north and west of Jaʽār, killing 16 militants, while land forces were preparing to capture a key hilltop factory overlooking the town. On 12 June, both Zinjibar and Ja'an were confirmed as completely recaptured by the Yemeni government, with AQAP forces withdrawing to nearby Shuqrah. On 15 June, army forces took control of Shuqrah after a battle which killed 40 militants. Shuqrah was constituted as AQAP's last major population centre in Abyan. On 23 June, with mounting military and tribal pressure, AQAP fled Azzan into neighboring provinces. With their retreat from Azzan, AQAP lost their last stronghold in the south. Mines placed by retreating AQAP forces lead to 73 civilian deaths in the liberated cities by 26 June.

==== Sana'a bombing ====
On 21 May, a soldier wearing a belt of explosives carried out a suicide attack on military personnel preparing for a parade rehearsal in Sana'a for Unity Day. The attack killed over 90 people and injured 200 more. Ansar al-Sharia claimed responsibility for the attack as a response to the government offensive in Abyan.

On 18 June, an AQAP suicide bomber assassinated Yemeni general Salem Ali Qatan in Aden. Qatan had led the Abyan offensive which expelled AQAP forces from key cities in the governorate. The assassin detonated his explosive belt next to a vehicle transporting Qatan, killing him as well as 2 other soldiers, along with injuring 12.

On 10 October, AQAP gunmen on a motorcycle shot and killed the U.S. embassy's head of security, Qassem Aqlan, while he was travelling in a vehicle in Sana'a.

On 8 December a suspected AQAP ambush in Marib governorate killed 8 soldiers, inducing a senior officer. On 9 December, government airstrikes on a farm in Marib reportedly killed 4 AQAP members.

=== 2013 ===
==== Battle of Rada'a ====
On 27 April, AQAP fighters attacked a military checkpoint in Rada'a, killing 5 soldiers and suffering 2 deaths. The same day, AQAP gunmen on a motorcycle assassinated the intelligence chief of Mukalla.

On 25 May, an AQAP grenade attack on a checkpoint in Al-Shihr, Hadhramaut killed a police officer and a civilian, and wounded two others. The same day, the Yemeni Interior Ministry stated that AQAP had seized several villages in Hadhramaut, including Ghayl Ba Wazir, supposedly in a bid to establish an emirate in the governorate.

On 17 July, deputy leader of AQAP Said al-Shihri was killed in a U.S. drone strike in Saada governorate. He was speaking on his cellphone when the attack took place. Shihri had previously been declared "dead" by the Yemeni government on 10 September and on 24 January, though this was dispoven in both instances. In this case, an AQAP message officially announced that he had died.

On 19 July, a gunman shot and killed a member of the Popular Resistance Committees in Mudiyah, Abyan before fleeing. AQAP was suspected of conducting the attack.

On 21 July, Iranian diplomat Nour Ahmad Nikbakht was kidnapped by AQAP gunmen who stopped his car in Sana'a shortly after leaving his home.

On 11 August, a suspected AQAP attack near a gas plant in Shabwah killed 5 soldiers. The attackers opened fire on a military checkpoint near the Balhaf terminal before fleeing.

On 20 September, AQAP launched coordinated attacks on multiple military encampments across Shabwah, killing at least 38 and wounding dozens. A suicide bomber rammed their vehicle into one site at a base in al-Mayfa'a district after militants overpowered the guards. Firefights in another site of the base lead to more casualties. A car bomb at a base in al-Ain district exploded prematurely, leading to a heavy firefight which resulted in the militants seizing multiple soldiers and vehicles. 8 AQAP fighters were killed in the fighting.

A prison break in Sana'a involving nearly 300 AQAP members was foiled on 22 October. The inmates attacked guards with knives and iron bars before seizing their weapons and taking multiple guards hostage. Prison guards stopped their attempts to flee, with the inmates releasing the hostages the next day.

On 26 November, two Belarusian defence contractors were shot and killed by gunmen riding on a motorcycle. AQAP was suspected of conducting the attack. In response, the government of Sana'a banned motorcycles in the city for a two-week period.

==== Sana'a attack ====
On 5 December, an AQAP attack on the Yemeni Defense Ministry in Sana'a involving a series of bombings and gun attacks killed at least 56 people. After footage of the attack was aired on Yemeni television showing the destruction of a hospital within the ministry compound and the killing of medical personnel and patients, AQAP leader Qasim al-Raymi released a video message apologizing, claiming that the team of attackers were directed not to assault the hospital in the attack, but that one had gone ahead and done so.

=== 2014 ===
On 8 January, a U.S. drone strike in al-Qatan, Hadhramaut killed two suspected AQAP members in a vehicle.

On 24 March, AQAP gunmen in multiple vehicles opened fire on a military checkpoint in Hadhramaut, killing 20 Yemeni soldiers.

A series of coordinated U.S. airstrikes and Yemeni ground raids from 19 to 21 April in Abyan and Shabwah killed close to 55 AQAP members. In retaliation, AQAP killed 4 security officials over the next day.

On 29 April, the Yemeni government launched an offensive against AQAP strongholds in Abyan and Shabwah governorates. The offensives specifically targeted the mountainous al-Mahfad district in Abyan and the town of 'Azzan in Shabwah, where AQAP forces had entrenched themselves after being forced out of population centres in the south. The same day, the army reported killing 8 AQAP militants and suffering 3 deaths, while an AQAP ambush on a convoy in Shabwah killed 15 soldiers. On 1 May, 7 AQAP fighters, including Uzbek commander Abu Muslim al-Uzbeki were killed by fighting in al-Mahfad. On 3 May, 5 militants were killed in by airstrikes in Shabwah. The next day, the military reported killing 20 AQAP members and wounding dozens more. On 6 May, al-Mahfad was captured by the army after a battle which killed "dozens" of AQAP fighters, who were forced to flee. By 8 May, the army had secured al-Mahfad and Azzan.

On 9 May, at least 4 Yemeni soldiers were killed in a skirmish when a vehicle attacked the gates of the Presidential Palace in Sana'a. Authorities claimed that AQAP was responsible.

On 25 June, AQAP launched an attack on Seiyun airport, Hadhramaut. Gunmen stormed the airport, killing 3 soldiers and briefly seizing it before army reinforcements resecured it, killing 6 of the militants and capturing 4.

After being driven out of the southern areas of the country over the past two years, AQAP began regrouping in the eastern Hadhramaut governorate of Yemen, where they prepared for the establishment of another "emirate". On 22 July, the group began distributing leaflets across the governorate ordering people to adhere to their law.

On 21 September, the Houthis took control of the capital of Yemen, Sana'a, after a brief battle with government forces. The same day, the Hadi government and the Houthis agreed to form a joint-unity government. The Shiite Houthis, whose insurgency had previously operated predominantly in northern Yemen, had now positioned themselves directly adjacent to AQAP's sphere of influence in the central and southern governorates, leading to conflict that would persist over the rest of AQAPs insurgency in Yemen.

On 4 October, an AQAP attack in al-Bayda city killed at least 9 people. AQAP had attacked the city as they saw it as "sympathetic" to the Houthis.

AQAP took responsibility for a suicide bombing in Tahrir Square, Sana'a, on 9 October which killed 47 people and injured at least 75 others. The Square had previously been the centerpoint of the revolution a month earlier.

On 15 October, Houthis and AQAP forces clashed in Rada'a, killing at least 10 people. The clashes had occurred after the Houthis had attempted to take control of areas surrounding the town. The same day, the Houthis had seized the AQAP stronghold of Ibb. Further clashes occurred on 16 October, killing another 10 Houthi fighters. AQAP also released a statement the same day claiming to have captured Odien, a small town close to Ibb, for a short time in order to not let the Houthis seize it. By 27 October, the fighting had killed more than 250 people, as AQAP recruited more Sunni tribesmen against the Houthis, who at that point occupied a large portion of the city. On 10 November, AQAP launched a counterattack on the Houthis in Rada'a, killing at least 30 people, while a truce was signed between AQAP and the Houthis in Odien.

On 21 November, AQAP released a message rebuking the Islamic State, which had declared the established of a Yemen branch earlier in the week. Up until that point AQAP had adopted a more neutral approach to ISIS compared to other al-Qaeda branches which were in direct conflict with ISIS.

==== U.S. hostage rescue missions ====
On 26 November, United States Navy SEALs from the Naval Special Warfare Development Group collaborated with Yemeni special forces in a hostage rescue mission to free American journalist Luke Somers, along with multiple other hostages held by AQAP. The mission took place in northern Hadhramaut, along the border with Saudi Arabia. The SEALs engaged AQAP in a firefight near a cave housing the hostages, killing 7 militants. The raid rescued 8 hostages of various nationalities, but they did not include Somers, who was moved to another area alongside 4 other hostages days before the raid. Later in December, AQAP published a video threatening to kill Somers within 72 hours of its release. Another rescue mission subsequently occurred on 6 December in southern Shabwah. 40 SEALs backed by Yemeni special forces attempted to infiltrate the AQAP compound housing the targets, but they were spotted about 100 metres away, leading to heavy skirmishes. Upon entering the compound, 2 hostages, including Somers, were found shot, while the 3 other hostages were missing. Both hostages eventually died while being transported.

On 3 December, a suicide car bomb targeted the home of the Iranian ambassador to Yemen in Sana'a, killing 3 people and injuring 17. AQAP was suspected to have done the attack, seeing that the Houthis enjoy support from the Iranian government.

On 16 December, AQAP attempted a car bombing against Houthi gathering points in Rada'a. One bomb made it to the target, but another bomb came short, exploding next to a school bus. The bombings killed 31 people altogether, 20 of them children.

On 31 December, a suicide bombing occurred in Ibb during a Mawlid festival, killing 49 Houthi fighters and wounding 70. AQAP was predicted to be the perpetrator, seeing that the festival was organized by Houthi supporters and officials.

=== 2015 ===
On 7 January, an AQAP car bomb exploded outside of a police academy in Sana'a, killing at least 37 people and injuring 66 others.

On 5 February, AQAP announced the death of senior Sharia cleric Harith al-Nadhari to a U.S. drone strike on 31 January. Al-Nadhari was killed while travelling in a vehicle in Shabwah along with 3 other AQAP members.

On 5 March, Nour Ahmad Nikbakht was repatriated to Iran by AQAP in a prisoner swap with Iranian government. In return for the diplomat, AQAP freed 5 senior al-Qaeda leaders held by Iran; Egyptians Saif al-Adel, Abu Khayr al-Masri and Abdullah Ahmed Abdullah, and Jordanians Khalid al-Aruri and Sari Shihab.

President Abdrabbuh Mansur Hadi resigned on 21 January. "With Hadi's departure, the United States may no longer have explicit Yemeni permission for the drone campaign. Even if it were to continue, U.S. officials said it may become increasingly difficult to find targets. "The issue would be whether you have the intelligence you need," the senior U.S. official said. "To a large extent, that was a product of the cooperation we got from the Yemenis.""

A few days after 21 January, the Houthis seized the Presidential Palace and consolidated their power. After the Houthis dissolved parliament and established their own interim government on 6 February, Hadi fled Sana'a on 21 February to Aden, where he later rescinded his abdication and labeled his government as the legitimate representatives of Yemen. Hadi fled Yemen on 25 March as a ten-country coalition led by Saudi Arabia and endorsed by the United States announced their intervention in Yemen in support of the internationally recognized government and against the Houthis. Al-Qaeda's insurgency had been transitioned into Yemen's full-scale civil war, a conflict which they would exploit to gain an unprecedented amount of power. AQAP, despite their hostility to Yemen's government, decided to fight on the same side as them in order to counter the Houthis

==== First Battle of Mukalla ====
On 20 March, AQAP captured the capital of Lahij Governorate, al-Houta, killing 20 soldiers and occupying the city for multiple hours before being driven out. By late-March, most army and coalition forces were battling the Houthis, who were attempting to push into Aden. This gave AQAP an opportunity to make major gains in regions away from the Houthi conflict. On 2 April, AQAP fighters stormed the capital of Hadhramaut governorate, Mukalla, breaching its central prison and releasing over 300 inmates, about a third of which were believed to be AQAP affiliated. Among the released included senior commander Khalid Batarfi, who led AQAP's Abyan offensive in 2011. The militants had also seized key government buildings within the city, such as the presidential palace and the central bank, the latter of which they looted more than US$1 million from. By the next day, Mukalla, the fifth-largest city in Yemen, had fallen completely to AQAP as the military was driven out by mortar fire. On 4 April, the Hadhramaut Tribal Alliance, a pro-government tribal militia, occupied 2 army bases and began to enter the city to battle AQAP. By 7 April, AQAP had reportedly lost nearly half of the city to the tribesmen. On 12 April, a U.S. drone strike in Mukalla killed multiple AQAP members, including senior cleric Ibrahim al-Rubaysh. AQAP militants seized Mukalla's Rayan airport, a nearby oil terminal on the coast of the city, and the city's main army base on 16 April. The next day, the group seized a large weapons depot near the city, capturing dozens of tanks, rocket launchers and small arms. After forging a truce with the local tribes of the city, AQAP had consolidated their power in Mukalla. Soon after, the group transferred power to a civilian council, assigning them a budget of over $4 million to maintain the city. AQAP refrained from imposing the strict Sharia law that they once imposed in their Abyan emirate, their only notable presence in the city being a police station where they mediated local disputes. The group reportedly collected an estimated US$2 million daily from customs fees on goods entering through the port of Mukalla.

By mid-June, AQAP had occupied large portions of Hadhramaut as its new emirate, and were engaging the Houthis in al-Bayda, although to a lesser amount of success. AQAP has prioritized establishing relations with the local tribes of Hadhramaut and al-Bayda in order to gain their acceptance. The largely Sunni tribes of the area see AQAP as a bulwark against the Shiite Houthis. AQAP has used Mukalla and their Hadhramaut emirate in general as a headquarters and a launching pad for its activities in the rest of the country.

On 7 May, AQAP released a message announcing the death of Nasser bin Ali al-Ansi, who had been killed on 21–22 April from a U.S. drone strike in Mukalla along with 6 other AQAP members. The senior military strategist was in a vehicle parked next to the presidential palace when he was killed. Al-Ansi had appeared in multiple AQAP messages, including videos announcing the ransom and death of Luke Somers, and a video claiming responsibility for the Charlie Hebdo shooting.

On 16 June, AQAP announced the death of leader Nasser al-Wuhayshi from a U.S. drone strike on 11–12 June, along with 2 other militants. The White House labeled Wuhayshi's death a "major blow" to AQAP and the most significant loss in al-Qaeda's leadership since the killing of Osama Bin Laden in 2011. At the time of his death, Wuhayshi was essentially second-in-command of al-Qaeda, only behind Ayman al-Zawahiri, and was the main facilitator between all of al-Qaeda's affiliates and their allies. Qasim al-Raymi was announced to be his successor.

A mass prison break in Taiz on 30 June lead to more than 1,200 inmates escaping, many of them AQAP members. AQAP fighters attacked the prison, provoking heavy clashes and drawing out the guards, allowing the prisoners to flee.

On 31 July, an AQAP suicide car bombing in Qoton, Hadhramaut killed 9 Yemeni soldiers at an army checkpoint.

On 22 October, reports indicated that AQAP flags were being hung up in different parts of the seemingly government-controlled Aden governorate, including Tawahi district, which they allegedly had full control over and were patrolling with convoys. AQAP had activity within multiple areas of Aden, including Crater, Khor Maksar and Brigua.

==== Fall of Zinjibar and Jaʽār ====
On 2 December, hundreds of AQAP fighters stormed through Zinjibar and Jaʽār, leading to fierce clashes with the local Popular Committee's. Zinjibar was previously the site of a battle in August between the Houthis coming from Aden and the pro-government committees, who managed to drive out the Houthis with government and coalition support. AQAP was reportedly in control of much of Abyan governorate at the time of the offensive. In Jaʽār, at least 4 Popular Committee commanders were killed, and their headquarters was destroyed. By the end of the day, the towns were in complete control of AQAP, with the battles altogether killing 7 committee militiamen and 5 AQAP fighters.

On 22 December, suspected AQAP gunmen killed Popular Resistance Committee leader Jalal al-Awbali and an army colonel in Dar Sad district, Aden. The same day, a U.S. airstrike killed 4 AQAP members near the border of al-Bayda and Shabwah.

=== 2016 ===
==== Southern Abyan offensive ====
On 26 January, AQAP recaptured al-Houta, storming several government buildings and blowing up the local police headquarters. From there, AQAP would launch an offensive to connect their territory in Abyan from the west to Shabwah from the east. On 1 February, AQAP seized the town of Azzan in southeastern Shabwah with seemingly no resistance. On 4 February, AQAP seized al-Mahfad in Abyan, while a U.S. drone strike killed field commander Jalal Baleedi along with 2 of his bodyguards in Azzan. On 8 February AQAP captured the town of Shuqrah in Abyan and attempted to capture Ahwar, though they were pushed out. The major component of AQAP's offensive began on 20 February when hundreds of fighters attacked Ahwar, Abyan, clashing with Popular Committee forces. By the end of the day, AQAP was in control of Ahwar, killing 3 committee soldiers. With the fall of Ahwar, AQAP had control of nearly all of the coast in southern Abyan, connecting their emirate from Mukalla in Hadhramaut to Zinjibar in Abyan. Clashes with government loyalists persisted throughout AQAP's occupation.

==== Battle of al-Mansoura ====
Conflict between pro-government elements and AQAP in Aden increased compared to the previous year. On 1 January, Popular Committee fighters attacked an AQAP convoy heading to Aden killing 3 members including senior Sharia cleric Ali Abed al-Rab bin Talab. On 6 February, government forces battled AQAP forces entrenched within al-Mansoura district while coalition airstrikes attacked their positions. The battle killed several people. On 11 February, 3 Yemeni soldiers were killed in a suspected AQAP attack in al-Mansoura. The next day, AQAP gunmen assaulted a police outpost in the Basateen area in northern Aden governorate, killing 5 police officers. On 13 March, coalition Apache helicopters attacked AQAP positions in al-Mansoura, reportedly killing 16 militants and 1 civilian. The coalition had struck several armored vehicles and a government compound used by AQAP. On 14 March, a UAE fighter jet crashed into a mountain near Aden while battling entrenched AQAP forces, killing the 2 pilots. While authorities first claimed that the crash was due to a malfunction, it was later revealed that AQAP had shot down the aircraft with a Russian SA-7 surface-to-air missile. On 30 March, government forces retook al-Mansoura, capturing the central prison, main market, key roads and several government buildings after a 3 hour long gunfight. They had also captured 21 AQAP fighters during the operation. Remaining AQAP forces were suspected to have fled to Lahij.

On 22 March, a U.S. airstrike on an AQAP training camp in Hajr district, Hadhramaut killed 40 fighters and injured an additional 25. Another U.S. drone strike occurred on 26 March in Abyan, killing 8 AQAP members.

On 15 April, as a part of its campaign to secure Aden and its surrounding areas, government forces retook al-Houta from AQAP as they fled the city, arresting 49 militants in the operation.

==== Second Battle of Mukalla ====
Second Battle of Al Mukalla
- Part of the Yemeni Civil War (2014–present) and the Saudi Arabian-led intervention in Yemen
Date	24–25 April 2016 (1 day)
Location	Mukalla, Hadramaut, Yemen
Result	coalition victory

Belligerents
AQAP	(Yemen) Hadrami Elite Forces; United Arab Emirates Supported by: (Yemen) Hadi-led government Saudi Arabia; United States (Airstrikes, limited involvement)

Commanders and leaders
Qasim al-Raymi; Khalid Batarfi; Mamoun Abdulhamid Hatem †; Sa’ad bin 'Atef al Awlaki; Mohammed Saleh al-Orabi	Major general Faraj Al-Bassani (Commander of the Second Military Region) (United Arab Emirates) Brigadier general Musallam Al Rashidi (Commander of UAE Force in Hadhramout) (Saudi Arabia) Brigadier general Auni Al Qurni (Deputy commander of KSA Special Forces in Yemen)

Strength
1,000+ fighters	2,000 soldiers

Casualties and losses
89–91 killed 30 wounded (by airstrikes); 100–800 killed (ground offensive, Saudi coalition claims); 8–250 captured 10 killed (AQAP claims during ground offensive); Total losses: 927–1,171	27 killed 60 wounded Total losses: 87
- 2 Saudi citizens executed by AQAP; 4 civilians killed by drone strike 8 civilians killed by air strike (AQAP claim); Total: 14 civilians killed

On 24 April, Yemeni and Saudi-led coalition forces began an offensive to recapture the territory held by AQAP in southern Yemen, with its first target being Mukalla. The offensive served as the first major anti-AQAP operation mounted by the coalition since the beginning of the war, likely due to increasing negotiations with the UN to end the conflict. Initially, the coalition launched a barrage of airstrikes against AQAP forces, while close to 2,000 Yemeni and UAE ground forces entered the city from the east. The same day, AQAP began withdrawing its forces from Mukalla after negotiations with the government allowed them to leave the city without being targeted so they can regroup in Shabwah and Abyan. By the next day, Mukalla, the capital of AQAP's emirate, was completely recaptured by the government with barely any fighting, though the coalition claimed to have killed over 800 AQAP fighters through its airstrikes. On 26 April, government forces captured the city of Ghayl Ba Wazir, AQAP's last stronghold in Hadhramaut. After being expelled from power, AQAP began an insurgency within the governorate.

On 30 April, government forces captured a camp in Qoton, Hadhramaut held by AQAP, arresting 8 militants and seizing "large amounts" of weapons.

On 21 May, Yemeni soldiers with assistance from coalition helicopters killed 13 AQAP members in a raid near Mukalla. Authorities confirmed that the militants were preparing to launch attacks on several military command centres the next day.

On 14 August, government forces along with coalition aircraft retook control of Zinjibar and Jaʽār in Abyan, killing about 40 AQAP fighters before they fled the cities.

U.S. drone strikes from 24 August to 4 September in Shabwah reportedly killed 13 AQAP militants. On 22 September, a U.S. drone stroke in al-Sawma'ah district, al-Bayda killed AQAP regional commander Abdallah al-Sanaani along with his bodyguard while they were in a vehicle.

=== 2017 ===
On 3 January, government and coalition forces attacked an AQAP stronghold within the al-Maraqisha mountains in Abyan, east of Aden. The battle killed 15 AQAP fighters and 11 soldiers

==== Yakla raid ====
Anti-AQAP operations by coalition and American forces increased significantly under newly inaugurated U.S. president Donald Trump. From 20 to 22 January the U.S. conducted several airstrikes targeting AQAP in the town of al-Bayda, killing 5. On 29 January, DEVGRU conducted a raid in al-Ghayil, a town in the Yakla region of al-Bayda. The raid was authorized in order to collect key AQAP documents and information, as well as the possibility of neutralizing AQAP leader Qasim al-Raymi, whom UAE intelligence suggested could be present. Originally meant to be unexpected, AQAP prematurely detected the SEALs, eventually leading to a heavy firefight in the village which claimed the life of 1 American soldier and wounded 5 others. 14 AQAP fighters were killed along with "valuable information" being gathered, but al-Raymi was not killed or captured in the raid. Additionally, at least 16 civilians were killed, including the eight-year-old daughter of Anwar al-Awlaki, Nawar.

On 3 February, 13 AQAP fighters were killed in Lawdar after attempting to take over government buildings in the city.

On 27 February, an AQAP suicide bomber disguised in a military uniform killed at least 8 soldiers at an army base in Zinjibar.

From 2–3 March, the U.S. reportedly conducted over 30 airstrikes targeting AQAP, killing at least 20 members. An airstrike on 2 March in Wadi Yashbum, Shabwah killed multiple AQAP members including senior leader Usayd al-Adani and former Guantanamo Bay detainee Mohamed Tahar. Another airstrike on 5 March killed 2 AQAP members on a motorcycle in Ahwar.

On 27 March, AQAP attacked a government building in Lahij, driving a car bomb into its gate and engaging in a firefight with local soldiers. 6 soldiers and 4 civilians were killed in the attack, while 4 AQAP fighters were also killed.

On 29 March, a U.S. airstrike killed 4 AQAP members in vehicle in Mudiyah, Abyan. On 31 March, a U.S. drone strike in al-Wadi district, Abyan killed 3 AQAP members in a house, including local leader Waddah Muhammed Amsouda.

On 14 April, senior AQAP leader Ahmed Awad Barhamah was killed in an ambush in southeast Shabwah by tribal fighters.

==== Al-Hathla raid ====
On 23 May, DEVGRU conducted another raid against AQAP in Ma'rib governorate, targeting a compound of the group using 'a combination of small arms fire and precision airstrikes' in order to gather intelligence. The U.S. reported the deaths of 7 AQAP members and no civilians casualties, however UK-based human rights group Reprieve reported that the raid had killed 5 civilians and wounded 6, with SEALs killing a blind villager as he walked out of his home and killing 4 more after they began arguing with them after the fact.

On 12 June, AQAP attacked an army camp in Hadhramaut killing 2 soldiers and losing 10 fighters. The militants had set off 2 car bombs outside the base before attacking, but were rebuffed.

On 2 August, an AQAP suicide car bomb attacked the base of a UAE-backed pro-government force in Rudum district, Shabwah, killing 6 soldiers and destroying 2 vehicles.

On 3 August, Yemeni and Emirati forces backed by a small contingent of U.S. troops launched an offensive to oust AQAP from their southern stronghold, starting with Shabwah. Among the fighters included the UAE-trained Shabwani Elite, local tribesmen who were assured that the Emirati Red Crescent would provide money to local communities if secured from AQAP. Major fighting reportedly did not take place as AQAP simply retreated from the governorate, letting the government establish control in many areas for the first time in multiple years by 7 August. Among the secured areas include historic AQAP stronghold Azzan, a significant crossroads town which was seized by the group a year before.

==== Al-Wade'a offensive ====
After securing Shabwah, pro-government forces moved to Abyan to battle AQAP forces who fled to al-Wade'a district. On 13 September, Yemeni forces entered al-Wade'a and quickly secured it by the next day as AQAP fighters reportedly fled to Muhafid district. Government forces arrested 7 AQAP members during the operation. On 19 September, security forces captured AQAP stronghold Mudiyah district after clashes with militants.

On 23 October, an AQAP attack on a military base in Mudiyah left 8 people dead. A convoy of 5 AQAP fighters with explosive belts arrived at the base and were dropped off before the vehicle exploded, killing 3 soldiers. The remaining 4 fighters were gunned down before the reached the base.

On 29 October, UAE-backed Yemeni forces captured al-Mahfad district in Abyan, a stronghold of AQAP. The district was mostly seized without conflict, though an AQAP militant drove a truck with explosive into Yemeni forces with they were entering the district, killing 1 soldier and wounding 5 others. The operation proved to be a major blow to AQAP's activities in the south.

On 5 November, an AQAP attack in Khor Maskar district, Aden killed 5 troops. A suicide car bomb exploded outside the local security headquarters of the district, with gunmen later storming the building and destroying several documents while a suicide bomber detonated their explosive belt.

=== 2018 ===
On 30 January, an AQAP attack on a security checkpoint in Shabwah killed 14 soldiers and wounded multiple others. A suicide bomber had attacked a group of security forces before mortars and machine guns were fired upon them.

==== Operation al-Faisal ====
On 17 February the UAE-backed Hadhrami Elite Force with coalition air support announced Operation al-Faisal, targeting an AQAP stronghold and operations room within the Al-Masini Valley in Hadhramaut after surrounding the area a day before. The Hadhrami Elite seized the outpost on 18 February, killing 20 AQAP militants and losing 8 soldiers, along with capturing multiple AQAP members.

==== Operation Decisive Sword ====
On 26 February, Shabwani Elite forces backed by UAE soldiers launched an operation against AQAP strongholds in Shabwah, securing major roads in the northern portion of the governorate on the same day. By 27 February, the Shabwani Elite had cleared as-Said district from AQAP presence.

==== Operation Sweeping Torrent ====
Operation Sweeping Torrent
- Part of the Yemeni Civil War (2014–present) and the Saudi Arabian-led intervention in Yemen
Date	7–12 March 2018
Location	Wadi Hamara and al-Mahfad, Abyan, Yemen
Result	coalition victory

Belligerents
AQAP	(South Yemen) Security Belt forces United Arab Emirates

Commanders and leaders
Qasim al-Raymi; Khalid Batarfi; Abu Mohesen Basabreen †	(South Yemen) Major General Aidarus al-Zoubaidi (United Arab Emirates) Brigadier general Musallam Al Rashidi

Strength
unknown	unknown

Casualties and losses
Heavy losses (per coalition)	unknown

On 7 March, Security Belt Forces with assistance from the UAE and the coalition launched Operation Sweeping Torrent to clear al-Mahfad district and Wadi Hamara, some of AQAP's last strongholds in Abyan. By 8 March, the UAE claimed to have inflicted 'heavy losses' on AQAP forces, including the death of AQAP leader Abu Mohesen Basabreen. On 10 March, the Security Belt raided several AQAP bases in al-Mahfad, arresting 6 AQAP members and seizing large supplies of weapons and munitions as hundreds of militants fled the area. The operation concluded on 12 March, with both al-Mahfad and Wadi Hamara being captured by the Security Belt.

Operation Black Mountains

On 28 April, the Yemeni military, coalition and Hadhrami Elite launched Operation Black Mountains with the goal of seizing AQAP strongholds in rural Hadhramaut. By 29 April, Amd, Dhlia'ah, Hajr and Yabuth districts were all secured from AQAP.

==== Battle of Maraqisha ====
On 10 May, a force of 500 Security Belt soldiers launched an attack on an AQAP strongholds in the al-Maraqisha mountains of Abyan. During the battle, an AQAP bombing and ambush of a Security Belt vehicle killed one and injured 11 others. Security Belt forces secured the mountains after AQAP had fled the area, the battle in total killing five Security Belt soldiers and injuring 19, while 6 AQAP militants were killed.

On 6 July, a U.S. drone strike killed seven AQAP members in Shabwah while they were travelling in a vehicle. On 22 July, another U.S. drone strike in al-Rawda district, Marib, killed four AQAP members in a house.

In July, AQAP's relations with the Islamic State - Yemen Province (ISY) deteriorated into open conflict. Tensions between the two groups rose after ISY had incurred significant losses and began to operate more significantly in the Qayfa area of al-Bayda, an AQAP stronghold. On 10 July, clashes broke out between AQAP and ISY in Qayfa, killing 14 AQAP fighters and 22 ISY members. After ISY had published a video depicting 12 AQAP members captured by the group, AQAP retaliated by attacking ISY positions in Qayfa, killing 25 and seizing ISY weapons and equipment. AQAP and ISY continued to publish messages attacking each other in August, with an IS-affiliated media source claiming that ISY had killed 47 AQAP fighters by mid-September. On 21 October, ISY reported an attack on AQAP that destroyed two of their vehicles and killed one of their fighters. An ISY attack on AQAP positions on 5 November reportedly destroyed an AQAP vehicle.

On 6 August, an Associated Press investigation revealed that the Saudi-led coalition had been making secret deals with AQAP since 2016 that had them leave their strongholds without conflict. AQAP militants would retreat from the areas with their loot and equipment without being targeted, with the coalition then claiming large victories against AQAP forces. The Yemeni government and coalition see AQAP as essentially on the same side as them in the civil war, deeming the spread of the Iran-aligned Houthis as a bigger threat than the proliferation of AQAP. The report also revealed that hundreds of AQAP members had been recruited by coalition-backed militias due their reputation as exceptional fighters. AQAP membership within the coalition had gotten to the point where it was difficult to discern who was and wasn't AQAP.

On 24 November, AQAP attacked a military base in Abyan utilizing small arms and RPGs, killing 5 soldiers and injuring one. Two days later, a U.S. drone strike attacked an AQAP hideout in al-Quraishyah district, al-Bayda, killing 2 commanders and 4 members.

==== Operation Crushing Revenge ====
The Security Belt launched Operation Crushing Revenge on 9 December after uncovering an AQAP cell in the mountainous al-Fathan area of Mudiyah district, Abyan. The cell had come into al-Fathan from al-Bayda earlier in the month. Due to the difficulty of the terrain and AQAP mortar fire from the top of the mountains, Security Belt forces besieged al-Fathan for three days while firing artillery in the area and slowly clearing it from AQAP forces. On 11 December, clashes within al-Fathan killed two AQAP commanders. Despite the end of the operation and capture of al-Fathan on 12 December, AQAP still held pockets of northwest Mudiyah.

=== 2019 ===
A CNN investigation from 4 February revealed that the coalition had been giving US-manufactured weapons to AQAP-linked fighters. The coalition had essentially been using American weaponry as a 'form of currency' for different groups within the civil war, distributing said weapons to those who ally with them, including groups with members linked to AQAP.

On 7 April, UAE and Security Belt forces launched a large anti-terror military campaign to clear a number of mountains and valleys located in the Mahfad town, then a key hideout of AQAP militants. UAE-backed Yemeni security forces succeeded in seizing arms and ammunition, including hand grenades, improvised explosive devices and communication equipment and AQAP militants fled to other areas.

AQAP's conflict with ISY in al-Bayda intensified in March and April. On 21 March, ISY claimed to have fired a rocket at AQAP positions in the Dhi Kalib al Asfal village in al-Qayfa. On 24 March, the groups clashed in the al-Qayfa area, leading to multiple casualties and AQAP securing several ISY positions in Zaaj and Arar. The same day, AQAP conducted a suicide attack on AQAP headquarters in Dhi Khalib al Asfal and attacked Jalajal and al Humayda areas in al-Qayfa. On 27 March, ISY retook al-Humaydah in Qayfa from AQAP and claimed to have destroyed an AQAP command post in al-Quraishyah district. On 1 April, ISY attacked AQAP in Dhi Kalib al Asfal, claiming to have killed or wounded 10 AQAP members. On 18 April, AQAP attempted to mediate the conflict by offering a prisoner swap with ISY, promising to release all of their captured members.

On 4 May, a suspected AQAP roadside bomb killed 6 civilians in Al-Qatn, Hadhramaut.

On 2 August, AQAP fighters stormed a Security Belt military base in al-Mahfad, Abyan, remaining for several hours before military reinforcements drove them out. The attack killed at least 19 soldiers.

On 30 August, UAE airstrikes on AQAP in southern Yemen targeted a number of moving vehicles carrying AQAP members.

On 8 September, AQAP forces seized al-Wade'a district, Abyan weeks after pro-government Muslim Brotherhood-affiliated Islah militias arrived in the district. The capture of the district came during conflict between the Yemeni government and UAE-backed secessionist Southern Transitional Council (STC).

Fighting in al-Bayda resumed between AQAP and ISY during August and September, with AQAP claiming to have conducted 23 attacks against ISY in al-Qayfa between 27 August and 11 September.

On 10 October, U.S. President Donald Trump confirmed the death of AQAP chief bombmaker Ibrahim al-Asiri. Arisi had supposedly been killed some time in 2017 from an American counter-terrorism operation, though evidence for his death was inconclusive up until 2019. Arisi had been the designer for several bombs related to plots against the United States, such as the attempted bombing of Northwest Airlines Flight 253, with Trump stating that his death dealt a significant blow to AQAP's operations.

=== 2020 ===
On 31 January, The New York Times reported three U.S. officials "expressed confidence" that AQAP emir Qasim al-Raymi was killed in an airstrike on 29 January in Yalka, al-Bayda. His death was later confirmed by the White House on 6 February and by AQAP on 23 February, with Khalid Batarfi being named his successor. The killing of al-Raymi was one of the main contributors to AQAP's decline in activity over the year.

On 21 April, Houthi forces uploaded a video claiming to have captured a base of Ansar al-Sharia in the Khasaf area of al-Jawf, amidst a wider offensive in the governorate against the Yemeni government. The video appeared to show explosive belts, ammunition, AQAP flags and documents.

==== Al-Jawf offensive ====
The Houthis launched an offensive in al-Bayda governorate on 15 May as an extension of its offensive against the Yemeni government in al-Jawf. Among the goals of the offensive was reportedly to evict AQAP and ISY from the region. Due in part to their violent conflict with ISY cooling down during the year, AQAP shifted its rhetoric and attacks towards Houthi forces, attempting to attract anti-Houthi tribes in al-Bayda. By 11 August, the Houthis had been advancing rapidly towards northern al-Bayda, and by 19 August they had claimed to secure Wald Rabi' and al-Quraishyah districts. By the end of August, the Houthis had mostly evicted AQAP out of al-Qayfa, dealing a major blow to the group's activities in the governorate and overall.

On 15 August, AQAP killed and crucified dentist Motthar al-Youssoufi in as Sawma'ah district, al-Bayda, accusing him of spying for the U.S. government. On 25 August, they destroyed his clinic with explosives.

On 2 October, coalition and Yemeni security forces conducted a raid on an AQAP hideout in al-Ghaydah, Mahra governorate. The raid killed three AQAP members and lead to the capture of two.

=== 2021 ===
Since being expelled from al-Qayfa due to the Houthi offensive the previous year, AQAP's activities in 2021 were largely confined to the al-Sawma'ah, Dhi Na'im and Mukayras districts in southeast al-Bayda. Despite their defeat in the governorate, nearly 60% of AQAP activities were reported to be in al-Bayda, though reports indicated that most AQAP forces had retreated into Abyan and Shabwa governorates after the offensive. AQAP's main focus on Houthi forces was continued from 2020 and, in line with their retrenchment policy, AQAP's overall activities in Yemen were the lowest since at least 2015.

A UN report released on 4 February indicated that Khalid Batarfi had been captured in a raid in al-Ghaydah from the previous year. AQAP later released a video featuring Batarfi to disprove this claim.

On 18 March, gunmen suspected to be a part of AQAP attacked a military checkpoint in Abyan, killing eight soldiers and four civilians.

On 14 November, a U.S. drone strike on a vehicle travelling between Shabwa and al-Bayda injured an AQAP member and their wife. An additional drone strike targeted a vehicle responding to the incident, killing two suspected AQAP members and a civilian.

=== 2022 ===
Since 2022, AQAP has gradually shifted its activities towards the southern portion of Yemen after failure to regroup in the north, with more than 70% of the group's activities taking place in Abyan and Shabwah. After June 2022, there have been no recorded violent interactions between Houthi forces and AQAP. This may be the realization of a possible strategic shift within the group since 2020, whereby AQAP's main targets are now the Southern Movement and the Yemeni government, rather than Houthi forces. This change in strategy may be the result of AQAP's growing influence under Saif al-Adel, a senior Egyption al-Qaeda leader based in Iran with ties to the Islamic Revolutionary Guard Corps.

On 11 February, AQAP gunmen kidnapped 5 workers a part of the UN Department of Security and Safety in Abyan. The group demanded a ransom and the release of numerous members imprisoned by the government of Yemen. The workers were eventually released in August 2023.

On 5 March, suspected AQAP gunmen kidnapped two Doctors Without Borders workers in Hadhramaut. A raid by Yemeni security forces some time in September rescued the workers and captured the kidnappers. Four of the culprits were sentenced to death on 3 October 2023.

On 15 April, a prison break occurred in Seiyun, Hadhramaut, allowing 10 AQAP members to escape. The prisoners collaborated with a few guards and AQAP militants from the outside, staging a fight before overpowering the guards and fleeing.

On 6 May, large clashes occurred between AQAP and Security Belt forces north of Dhale. AQAP members arrested by the Security Belt refused to disarm themselves once they arrived at Security Belt headquarters, leading to a battle which killed 2 Security Belt commanders and 7 AQAP fighters.

On 22 June, AQAP was suspected of launching attacks in both Abyan and Shabwah Governorates that killed 10 Yemeni army soldiers altogether. An ambush on a military convoy in Abyan killed 5, while an attack on a checkpoint in Ataq, Shabwah killed another 5.

On 28 June, a car bombing in Aden killed six people and injured several others. The target of the bombing was the head of security in Lahij governorate, Saleh al-Sayed. Though no group took responsibility for the attack, AQAP was suspected of conducting it.

In August, the once-vaunted Al-Qaeda in the Arabian Peninsula was shown to be greatly weakened when none of the group's leaders were deemed potential successors to Ayman al-Zawahiri as leader of al-Qaeda following his death. According to a UN report published in February 2023, Al-Adel is also said to have succeeded al-Zawahiri at al-Qaeda's center, likely further expanding his influence over AQAP.

==== Operation Arrows of the East ====
On 22 August, the Southern Transitional Council launched Operation Arrows of the East with the goal of expelling AQAP from Abyan governorate. The operation had been launched after the conclusion of an offensive against the Yemeni government and Islah party which captured most of their territory in neighbouring Shabwah.

On 6 September, AQAP launched an attack on Security Belt Forces in Ahwar district which killed 21 STC soldiers and 6 AQAP fighters. On 11 September, STC forces reportedly took control of the al-Maraqisha mountains in Abyan and Shabwah, a historic AQAP safehaven in the south. The same day, the STC announced the second phase of the operation with additional forces being sent to al-Wade'a, Mudiyah, Lawdar, and Ahwar districts to target AQAP strongholds in the governorate. On the 12th, an AQAP IED detonated near an STC vehicle travelling in Mudiyah, killing three soldiers and injuring six. On the 14th, STC forces entered Wadi Omran, east of Mudiyah district, in what was labeled as the third phase of the operation. On the 18th, the STC announced that it had secured Wadi Omran, one of AQAP's last strongholds in Abyan, and captured a major base within it. The battle killed 32 STC soldiers and wounded 42, along with killing 24 AQAP members.

On 8 October, STC forces entered al-Mahfad district as a part of the fourth phase of their operation. On 9 October, a roadside bomb planted by AQAP detonated in Wadi Omran, leaving 4 Yemeni soldiers dead along with several others injured. By the 10th al-Mahfad was reportedly secured by the STC along with Lawdar, Al-Wade'a and Mudiyah districts, with an STC spokesperson declaring the operation to be over. On 5 November, STC forces advanced into Al-Khealah valley, an AQAP safe haven south of al-Mahfad. AQAP fled the valley without any major conflict, though a roadside bomb killed three STC soldiers and injured four.

=== 2023 ===
Imperfect map of political and military control in the ongoing Yemeni civil war (2014–present) as of March 2025. Controlled by Supreme Revolutionary Committee Controlled by Cabinet of Yemen

On 30 January, a U.S. drone strike killed three AQAP members travelling in a car through Marib.

On 26 February, a U.S. drone strike killed AQAP media official Hamad bin Hamoud al-Tamimi in his home in Marib. His death was confirmed by AQAP on 5 March. Tamimi was reportedly a judge in the group as well as the head for their Shura council. The strike also killed fellow media official Abu Nasser al-Hadhrami.

On 11 June, AQAP claimed responsibility for an attack on a military outpost in Shabwah which killed 2 Yemeni soldiers and wounded 3. The attack was seen as a display of strength by AQAP despite its losses from the STC operation the previous year.

On 1 August, an AQAP attack in Wadi Omran left at least 5 STC soldiers dead and wounded another 4. The attackers utilized mortars, artillery and rocket-propelled grenades before retreating.

On 5 August, a suspected AQAP IED targeted an STC vehicle in Mudiyah, killing at least two soldiers and wounding five.

On 10 August, an AQAP bombing of a Security Belt convoy passing through Abyan left 3 soldiers and commander Abdullatif Al-Sayed dead.

On 28 August, Doctors Without Borders reported that they had lost contact with two of their workers in Marib. AQAP was presumed to have kidnapped them.

On 24 September, an AQAP bomb detonated near an ambulance in al-Musaina, killing four Shabwa Defence Forces members. Hours later, AQAP carried out an attack on a Security Belt patrol near Wadi Omran, killing another four soldiers.

On 27 September, clashes between AQAP and the STC-affiliated Eastern Arrows Forces in Abyan killed five STC fighters and wounded three.

=== 2024 ===
In an announcement on 10 March, AQAP reported the death of emir Khalid Batarfi, along with the selection of his successor Sa'ad bin Atef al-Awlaki. The announcement did not provide a cause as to how Batarfi died, leading to speculation that he had died by natural causes.

On 24 March, AQAP ambushed an STC patrol in Wadi Omran, triggering a firefight which killed 2 soldiers and wounded 4. The militants also burned the vehicle of the patrol group.

On 29 April, an AQAP IED attack targeted an STC military vehicle in Mudiyah. The blast reportedly killed six STC soldiers and wounded 11 others.

On 21 June, AQAP ambushed an STC vehicle in Abyan, leading to the death of an STC soldier and the injury of two others.

On 16 August, AQAP carried out a suicide car bombing targeting a Security Belt military barracks in Mudiyah district. The attack killed 16 soldiers and injured 18.

On 15 October, a roadside bomb placed by AQAP killed a commander of the Shabwah Defense Forces.

On 19 October, AQAP fighters fired an RPG at an STC military vehicle in Mudiyah district, killing two soldiers.

On 21 October, an AQAP grenade attack in Wadi Omran killed an STC soldier and wounded two others, while also wounding two civilians.

=== 2025 ===
On April 13, 2025, the media arm of Al-Qaeda in the Arabian Peninsula (AQAP) released a statement claiming responsibility for two drone attacks carried out earlier that day against military outposts manned by UAE-backed forces in Yemen's Mudiyah district, located in the southern Abyan governorate. A 27-second video accompanied the statement, documenting drone bombings at two distinct locations.

On 21 October 2025, Al-Qaeda in Arabian Peninsula committed a suicide car attack against the STC forces in Abyan which killed 9-11 soldiers, including 4-5 STC soldiers and 5-6 Al-Qaeda militants.

=== 2026 ===
On September 22, 2026, a drone strike occurred in Burum, Hadhramaut Governate, resulting in the death of an alleged AQAP member Sulaiman Said al-Muhammadi. Hadhramaut Coastal Police responded to the scene of the strike, arresting several individuals, including an injured person. It is purported that the strike was organized by AFCENT, however no statement was issued.

On October 8, 2026, a drone strike targeted suspected members of AQAP in Al-Ma’awis settlement, near Mukalla, resulting in at least one injured. No claims of responsibility for the strike have been made.

== U.S. drone and cruise missile attacks ==
The U.S. claimed it first used targeted killing in November 2002, with the cooperation and approval of the government of Yemen. A CIA-controlled high-altitude Predator drone fired a Hellfire missile at an SUV in the Yemeni desert containing Qaed Salim Sinan al-Harethi, a Yemeni suspected senior al-Qaeda lieutenant believed to have been the mastermind behind the October 2000 USS Cole bombing that killed 17 Americans. He was on a list of targets whose capture or death had been called for by President George W. Bush. In addition to al-Harethi, five other occupants of the SUV were killed, all of whom were suspected al-Qaeda members, and one of whom (Kamal Derwish) was an American.

In May 2010, an errant U.S. drone attack targeting al Qaeda members in Wadi Abida, Yemen, killed five people, including Jaber al-Shabwani, deputy governor of Maarib province.

According to The Times, in 2010 the United States, in cooperation with Yemeni officials, launched four cruise missiles at suspected terrorist targets in Yemen. According to the Times, Yemen asked the United States to suspend the strikes after one of the missiles killed a pro-Yemeni tribal leader, Sheikh Jaber al-Shabwani, the deputy governor of Marib province, resulting in his tribe turning against the Yemeni government. The Times also stated that U.S. special forces troops were on the ground in Yemen helping to hunt al-Qaeda operatives.

On 3 June 2011, American manned jets or drones attacked and killed Abu Ali al-Harithi, a midlevel al-Qaeda operative, as well as several other militant suspects in a strike in southern Yemen. Four civilians were also reportedly killed in the strike. The strike was reportedly coordinated by American special forces and CIA operatives based in Sana. According to the Associated Press, in 2011 the U.S. government began building an airbase in the middle east from which the CIA and the U.S. military plan to operate drones over Yemen. On 30 September 2011, Anwar al-Awlaki was targeted by a US drone strike which successfully killed him, Samir Khan and a few other militants while they were all in the same car driving to get breakfast.

Since the start of the Second Trump administration in January of 2025, over 25 individual drone strikes have occurred throughout Yemen, tentatively linked to CENTCOM-forces.

== See also ==
- Islamic terrorism
