= Hadramaut insurgency =

Insurgency of the Yemeni Civil War

- Part of the Yemeni Civil War (2014–present)
Date	26 April 2016 – 29 April 2018 (2 years and 3 days)
Location	Hadramaut Governorate, Yemen
Status	Government victory: Initial large-scale insurgency in Hadramaut by AQAP and ISIL; Massive Hadrami elite forces detaining operations launched against AQAP; Majority of AQAP senior leadership in Hadramaut captured by the Hadrami Elite

Belligerents
AQAP: Hadrami Domestic council; Council of Sunni Scholars and al Jama'a	Yemen United Arab Emirates; Saudi Arabia	Islamic State – Yemen Province

Commanders and leaders
Khalid Batarfi (field commander in Hadramaut); Said Salih Abd-Rabbuh al-Omgy (recruiter and fundraiser); Muhammad Salih Abd-Rabbuh al-Omgy (facilitator); Abdallah Faysal Sadiq al Ahdal (tribal leader) Casualties: Abu Ali al Sayari (Deputy of Qasim al-Raymi, Emir of Hadramaut) (POW); Ahmed Said Awad Barhamah (Emir of Al Mukalla) (POW); Hathifa al Ghili (official) †; Qaid Al-Sayari (militant in Daw'an) †; Mohammed Saleh al-Orabi (official) (POW); Abu Jandal al-Hadrami (official) †; Abu Hashem al Sharuri (official) †; Abu Jandal al Adani (suicide bomber) †; Faisal Ali Al-Hakemi (Chief of Hisba force in Mukalla) (POW); Sorour al-Obeidi(Emir of Ash Shihr) (POW); Ali Rafsan al-Awbashi (official) †; Mubarak Salem Qaisl al-Hawair (official) †; Hussein Ali Bahidan (commander in Hadramawt) (POW); Abdullah Hassan Bamatarif (official of Sons of Hadramaut) †; Hussein Alawi al Majoh (official in Sons of Hadramaut) †	(Yemen) General Mubarak al-Oubthani (WIA) (Saudi Arabia) Major General Abdul Rahman al Halili (WIA) (Saudi Arabia) Faraj Salmin al Bahsani (Saudi Arabia) Mohammed Saeed al Jariri † (United Arab Emirates) Brigadier general Musallam Al Rashidi (Commander of UAE Force in Hadhramout)	Hamza al-Muhajir †; Abu al-Bara al-Ansari †

Units involved
Ansar al-Sharia; Sons of Hadramaut; Hisba force; Other Islamic militants	Yemeni Armed Forces: Tribal fighters; 37th Brigade; Hadrami Elite Force; United Arab Emirates Armed Forces; Saudi Arabian Army	Wilayah Hadramawt

Casualties and losses
37–77+ killed 1+ wounded 282+ captured (18 later released); 2 tons of explosives captured 20 car bombs destroyed 4+ arm catches captured	143+ killed 190+ wounded	186+ killed 691+ wounded 2 captured 3+ armoured vehicles destroyed 1 base destroyed
- 12+ killed

The Hadramaut insurgency was an insurgency in Yemen launched by AQAP and ISIL-YP against forces loyal to president Abdrabbuh Mansur Hadi.

== Background ==
On 24 April, UAE forces, along with Hadi loyalists, and Southern Movement fighters, attacked the de facto capital of Al-Qaeda forces in Yemen, Mukalla, and managed to recapture it after a day of fierce fighting. After that, most of AQAP forces withdrew to Abyan Governorate.

== Valley clashes and Qoton raid ==
One day after the AQAP withdrawal, AQAP fighters attacked 37th brigade, loyal to Hadi in Hadramaut Valley, which killed several AQAP fighters and wounded 5 loyalists. On April 27, most of the AQAP forces of Hadramaut, arrived in Zinjibar. Five days after the AQAP withdrawal, on April 30, Saudi coalition and Hadi loyalists tracked down AQAP fighters in the city of Qoton, just outside of Mukalla, and took over a camp that was in their control. Eight AQAP fighters were captured during the Qoton raid.

== Other incidents ==
On May 4, a southern Movement fighter was killed, and another wounded, and 5 AQAP fighters were captured in a military raid in Ash Shihr district. One of the captured, was Sorour al-Obeidi, Emir of Ash Shihr. On May 9, the unit of a Southern Movement commander, Omar bin Shikhan, arrested a leader of AQAP allied Hadrami Domestic council, named Abdullah al-Yazidi, and one of his aids. One day later, another mam, leader of Council of Sunni Scholars and al Jama'a, Ahmad bin Raoud, was arrested. Also, on the same day, Brigadier General of the Second Military District in Hadramaut, Faraj Salman al Bahsani claimed that government military forces arrested 30 AQAP members and found and cleared 20 vehicle-borne improvised explosive devices Mukalla district, Ash Shihr district, and Ghayl Ba Wazir district and seized AQAP weapons and documents, including lists of officials targeted for assassination. Al Bahsani stated that military forces seized at least four arms caches left behind by AQAP after coalition forces recaptured al Mukalla on April 24. On May 11, a militant possibly from AQAP, detonated himself targeting the convoy of Yemeni First Military District Commander, Major General Abdul Rahman al Halili, near al Qatan. The attack wounded al Halili and 15 others, and killed 5 soldiers and two civilians. On 13 May, Hadi government said that it captured more than 250 AQAP fighters after the battle, including a leader, Mohammed Saleh al-Orabi.

== Port of Khalaf fighting ==
On May 12, fighters belonging to ISIL, in coordination with AQAP forces conducted an assault in the port of Khalaf in near Mukalla. The assault began when an ISIL suicide bomber, named Hamza Al Muhajir exploded in a naval base in Khalaf, killing 13 and wounding at least 15. A second suicide bomber struck inside the base, and a third reportedly targeted the home of Second Military District Commander Faraj Salmin, who escaped unharmed. Government forces clashed with militants outside the base in the aftermath of the attacks. ISIL claimed the SVBIED attack that targeted forces at the naval base checkpoint, but the other two attacks remain unclaimed. Government sources attributed the attack at the checkpoint to AQAP.

== Police station bombing ==
On 15 May 2016, a suicide bomber of ISIL, named Abu al-Bara al-Ansari, exploded himself in the city's police station killing 41 police recruits, and 6 army guards of Hadramaut security chief, General Mubarak al-Oubthani. al-Oubthani was injured, along with more than 60 other police and soldiers.

== Continued fighting ==
On May 20, a US drone strike, killed two AQAP officials in Al Abr district. According to a tribal source, the air strike targeted the vehicle carrying two members of the Mahashma tribe, Ali Rafsan al-Awbashi and Mubarak Salem Qaisl al-Hawair. On May 22, Hadi loyalist forces conducted a raid in an AQAP bastion little outside of Mukalla, that killed 13 fighters. An hour after the raid, 3 additional AQAP fighters were killed when they blew up a bomb they were preparing to use, near the place of the raid. On June 3, Hadrami elite forces captured an Al-Qaeda cell inside Mukalla. Three of the men captured were explosive experts from Pakistan. On June 6, suspected AQAP militants riding a motorcycle assassinated army officer.

== June Mukalla attacks ==
On June 28, there were at least seven separate attacks in Mukalla. The attacks targeted fasting Yemeni soldiers during Ramadan, not long before they were about to break their fasting. The attack not only killed soldiers, but also civilians, who were mostly passers-by. The first attack was a suicide bombing. It occurred when a suicide bomber blew himself up after he asked soldiers if he could eat with them. Two suicide bombers were involved in the second attack. They also approached soldiers before blowing themselves up in two separate attacks. The fourth attack occurred when two more suicide bombers blew themselves up at the entrance to an army camp. Another suicide bomber forced his way into an area where soldiers were preparing to break their fast and eat. He blew himself up and caused a substantial amount of damage. Other bombings occurred when attackers posed as distributors for Iftar, handing out food before blowing themselves up. Other attacks are also said to have occurred when militants hid bombs in food boxes, and other militants also stormed a police station. Gun-battles broke out throughout the city. ISIL claimed responsibility. All of the attacks killed more than 43 Hadi loyals, and injured 37 people.

=== July attacks and call for surrender ===
On July 18, two suicide bombers targeted government checkpoints manned by soldiers loyal to President Hadi in al Ghabr and al Burum districts, al Mukalla city, killing 16 soldiers, and wounding another 34. Four civilians were also killed. On July 29, military commanders of Hadramaut loyal to Hadi, called for AQAP and ISIL fighters to surrender themselves to coalition and local authorities in a time period of two weeks, and if they do so, they will be pardoned and be given general amnesty.

== AQAP attempted to assault and other incidents ==
On August 2, AQAP forces attempted a major assault to retake they former capital, Mukalla, but Hadi government security forces and Saudi-led coalition forces disrupted the coordinated attack. AQAP militants attempted to attack the port with artillery and machine guns, while others approached the port by boats. Hadi-allied forces arrested some of the attackers, but others escaped. On September 20, Hadi loyalists arrested a man who acted as a judge for AQAP during their reign in Mukalla, but did not disclosed his name. On October 11, forces loyal to Hadi crushed a major Southern Movement demonstration in Mukalla, that called of independence in Southern Yemen. On October 21, a suspected US aircraft, targeted two AQAP officials in Wadi Obeida, Ma'rib Governorate on October 21. The airstrike killed 5 fighters, including Abdullah Hassan Bamatarif and Hussein Alawi al Majoh, two members of the AQAP's Sons of Hadramaut, the local branch of AQAP that operated and still, operates in Hadramaut and Mukalla. On 28 October, Hadi loyalists thwarted an assassination attempt on the life of General Faraj Salman al Bahsani. On November 1, the U.S. Department of the Treasury's Office of Foreign Assets Control designated the al Omgy and Brothers Money Exchange and the company's two owners, Said Salih Abd Rabbuh al Omgy and Muhammed Salih Abd Rabbuh al Omgy, as members and financial supporters of AQAP. The U.S. Treasury, in conjunction with the UAE, blocked al Omgy Exchange and the al Omgy brothers' assets, property, and access to the American and Emirati financial sectors. AQAP used al Omgy Exchange for financial transactions beginning in December 2013. Said al Omgy fund-raised and recruited Yemenis to join the Iraqi insurgency in 2005. The al Omgy brothers are based in Mukalla.

== Al Bahish grove fighting and other incidents ==
On November 8, Hadrami Elite Forces, clashed with AQAP militants in western al Mukalla City, killing six AQAP militants, and capturing another 4. Saudi-led coalition warplanes supported the elite forces during the clashes. On November 9, the Hadrami Elite forces attacked AQAP militants in al Bahish grove near Mayfa'a Hajar town, southwest of al Mukalla city, with support of Saudi-led coalition warplanes. Hadrami Elite forces raided the AQAP stronghold following intelligence reports indicating that AQAP militants were regrouping in al Bahish grove. The clash lasted almost one full day. The military source claimed that Hadrami forces killed more than 30 AQAP militants and suffered four casualties. One day later however, AQAP statements said that claims that Hadrami Elite forces killed more than 20 AQAP militants in al Bahish grove, were untrue, and claimed that killed 28 Hadrami fighters and reported that Saudi-led coalition Apaches killed three AQAP militants. Social media accounts also claimed that AQAP has recovered from its withdrawal from Yemen's coastal cities and has reconstituted. One day after the clashes, Hadrami elite managed to track down the assailants, and captured 11 of them. On November 30, a US drone strike, killed 3 AQAP fighters in Al Abr district. On December 8, the U.S. Department of the Treasury imposed sanctions on two Yemeni citizens and a Yemeni-based charity for financially supporting AQAP. Al Hasan Ali Ali Abkar is an AQAP commander for Ma'rib and al Jawf governorates who has been affiliated with the AQAP since 2015. Abdallah Faysal Sadiq al Ahdal is a senior tribal leader in Hadramawt governorate who participated in an AQAP cell in Ash Shahir, Hadramawt and has supported AQAP since 2009. Al Ahdal was also the president of the Rahmah Charitable Organization, which is located in Ash Shahir and has acted as a front to finance AQAP. On December 27, AQAP fighters ambushed the director general of the Shibam district in Shibam, Faraj Naji, wounding him, and killing two of his aids, his brother, Saleh Faraj Naji, and his cousin.

== Low level insurgency, formation of STC, and battle of Daw'an ==
Civilians protested around al Mukalla airport, on January 9, 2017 in response to alleged arbitrary detentions conducted by the Hadhrami Elite Forces. The Hadhrami Elite Force, reportedly accused the detainees of terrorist activities. Protesters are calling on the UAE to ensure the release of innocent detainees. Yemeni officials have released contradictory statements that refused to provide evidence for the suspects' detention and at times denied the existence of the detainees. Tribal militias also blocked the main road connecting Ataq, Shabwah Governorate with Mukalla to protest the detentions. On March 3, 2017, suspected AQAP forces assaulted a checkpoint manned by tribesmen loyal to Hadi in Daw'an district, killing 4, and wounding 2, and later retreating unharmed. On March 14, a US drone strike, killed two AQAP officials, who were also poets, named Abu Jandal al-Hadrami and Abu Hashem al Sharuri, in Al Abr district. On March 15, AQAP forces attacked Hadrami Elite forces in Adh Dhlia'ah district, wounding 3, and later retreating unharmed. On March 27, Hadrami Elit forces captured the deputy of AQAP leader Qasim al-Raymi, who also acted as the Emir of Hadramaut for AQAP, Abu Ali al Sayari, in central Hadramaut. 3 of his aid were also captured, and 2 more were killed, including an official, Hathifa al Ghili. On April 22, another AQAP commander captured in Mukalla by Hadrami Elit forces, named Ahmed Said Awad Barhamah, who was also known as Zarqawi, a reference to the Abu Muzab al-Zarqawi, the leader of Al-Qaeda in Iraq. The man, acts and acted as the Emir of ruler of Mukalla for AQAP. On 23 April, AQAP militants attacked Hadhrami Elite Forces Daw'an district, killing 2. meanwhile, residents of al Mukalla city, celebrated the one year anniversary of the city's liberation from AQAP on April 24. On May 3, Hadramaut Governor Ahmed bin Breik threatened to secede from the Yemeni government led by President Abdu Rabbu Mansour Hadi if the government fails to achieve peace with the al Houthi-Saleh bloc. Bin Brik's May 3 statement coincides with ongoing protests in Aden against President Hadi's decision to remove Aden governor Aydarus al Zubaidi, a senior leader in the Southern Movement. Between May 5 and May 7, fighting erupted in Daw'an district, between AQAP and Hadrami Elite forces, which resulted in the seizure of the district from AQAP, and the destruction of an army camp in the area. No reports of casualties emerged. On May 10, an AQAP suicide bomber exploded himself in Daw'an, killing more than 1 Hadrami Elite and wounding another 7. On May 12, was reported that forces loyal to Hadi, mobilized in Al Abr district, to counter the STC loyal Hadrami Elite forces. On May 18, the governor of Hadramaut accused the Hadi loyalists in the region, of supporting AQAP. On May 23, 18 jailed men accused of supporting AQAP were released by an order of Hadramaut governor.

== Fighting in Daw'an and other incidents ==
On June 12, AQAP forces attacked the Hadrami Elite forces base in Daw'an, and heavy fighting commenced. The Hadrami Elite force stated that they killed more than 10 AQAP fighters, and captured dozens more, but two of its soldiers were killed, and 16 were wounded. The Hadrami officials stated that "attackers set off two car bombs outside the camp, but our soldiers foiled the attack and managed to secure the camp and we are still pursuing those who have escaped in nearby farms," the official told Reuters by phone.

== Operation Al Faisal ==
On February 17, 2018 Hadrami Elite Forces, backed by heavy UAE aerial support, launched Operation Al Faisal, an offensive to retake Al-Masini Valley from AQAP militants. The offensive began when Hadrami Elite Forces launched a preemptive attack from three directions, that laid siege to all AQAP militants in the valley. On February 18 Hadrami Elite Forces had entered the valley and begun to slowly liberate all areas in and around the valley. After fierce fighting for 48 hours, AQAP militants retreated from the valley and Hadramai forces gained full control over an operation room that was run by AQAP militants in the valley and confiscated the equipment and ammunition used by the terror group in carrying out its criminal operations. The governor of Hadhramaut, Major General Faraj al-Bahsani declared that the operation was a success and that others like it, will follow until the region was fully rid of AQAP. Furthermore, while combing the area, large caches of ammunition, including mortar guns and missiles were found and the Yemeni forces secured the entire zone by staging military posts and patrol units across the surrounding plateaus to preempt any counter offensives by the terrorists.

== Operation Black Mountains ==
On 28 April, the Yemeni Army announced "Operation Black Mountains" against Al-Qaeda in the northern areas of Hadramaut. On 29 April 2018, the Yemeni military units backed by the United Arab Emirates reported recapturing the Amed, Dhalia, Hajer, and Yabouth districts from Al-Qaeda.

== See also ==
- Outline of the Yemeni crisis, revolution, and civil war (2011–present)
- Timeline of the Yemeni crisis (2011–present)
