= Battle of Al-Masini Valley =

Battle in the Yemeni Civil War

Coordinates: 14.665°N 48.900°E

Battle of Al Masini valley
- Part of the Yemeni Civil War (2014–present), the Saudi Arabian-led intervention in Yemen, and Hadramaut Insurgency
| Date | 17–18 February 2018 (1 day) |
| Location | Masini valley, Hadramaut Governorate, Yemen |
| Result | Coalition victory: Al-Masini Valley cleared of AQAP |

Belligerents
| al-Qaeda in the Arabian Peninsula | Hadrami Elite Force; United Arab Emirates |

Commanders and leaders
| Unknown | Faraj al-Bahsani |

Units involved
| Sons of Hadhramaut | Hadrami Elite forces |

Strength
| Unknown | Unknown |

Casualties and losses
| 19 killed | 8 killed |

The Battle of Al Masini Valley, code named Operation Al Faisal by the Saudi-led coalition, was an operation conducted by the UAE-backed Hadhrami Elite Force with backing from the UAE Armed Forces to clear the Al-Qaeda in the Arabian Peninsula (AQAP) controlled stronghold of Al-Masini Valley in central Hadhramaut governorate.

== Background ==
After being ousted from their emirates in Abyan and Shabwah governorates in 2012 through a government offensive, AQAP began shifting activities to the eastern Hadhramaut governorate. AQAP captured much of Hadhramaut including its capital of Mukalla in 2015 amid the breakout of the Yemeni civil war. Mukalla, along with most of Hadhramaut was recaptured by the Yemeni army along with coalition forces in 2016. After being ousted from power, AQAP continued maintaining a presence in the governorate, waging an insurgency against the government and the coalition.

Al-Masini Valley was an AQAP stronghold in central Hadhramaut used as an operation room for its activities in the region.

== Battle ==
On 16 February 2018, the Hadrami Elite Force surrounded Al-Masini Valley. The next day, the Hadrami Elite, backed by coalition aircraft and UAE ground support, launched a preemptive attack from three axles that laid siege to Al-Masini. By 18 February, Hadrami Forces had entered the valley and began to slowly retake all areas in and around it. On 18 February, Hadhrami Elite Forces were pushing into the valley from the lower and western entrance. Following fierce fighting over the day, AQAP forces retreated as Hadrami forces gained full control of the valley and began pursuing them. After AQAP had completely fled, Yemeni security forces established military posts and patrols around the area.

== Aftermath ==
After capturing the valley, security forces confiscated equipment and ammunition used by AQAP. This included large caches of ammunition, mortar guns and missiles.

The governor of Hadhramaut, Major General Faraj Al-Bahsani, declared that the operation was a success and that others like it will follow until the region was fully rid of AQAP.
