= Sari Shihab =

Jordanian national (1973–2019)

Sari Muhammad Hasan Shihab, known as Abu Khalid al-Muhandis (1973 – 22 August 2019), was a Jordanian national born in 1973 who was a member of the different groups that were founded by Abu Musab al-Zarqawi. He was one of the initial members of the Jama'at al-Tawhid wal-Jihad organization which was founded by al-Zarqawi in 1999. Shihab was also known as Abu Safar and Suhayb. Shihab was one of five al-Qaeda leaders who were released by Iran in March 2015 in exchange for a kidnapped Iranian diplomat in Yemen. The other four were Saif al-Adel, Abdullah Ahmed Abdullah, Abu Khayr al-Masri and Khalid al-Aruri.

According to one report, Sari Shihab was "involved in WMD programs and plots." Sky News described Shihab and Al-Aruri as "The Iranians have also released two lesser known, though no less dangerous, operatives, both of Jordanian descent."

Shihab was killed in an explosion in Idlib, Syria on August 22, 2019.
