= Mabkhoot bin Madhi =

Yemeni politician (born 1966)

- مبخوت بن ماضي
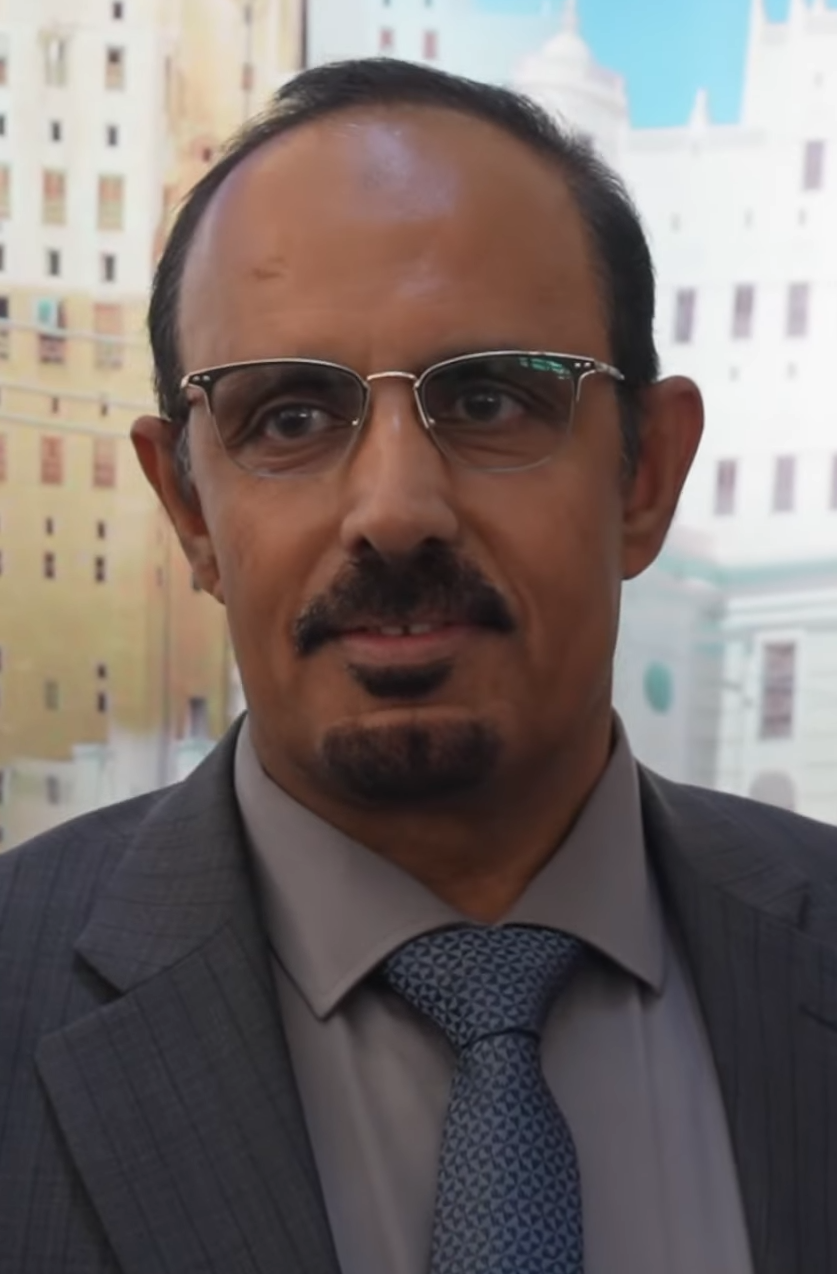
- Bin Madhi in 2023

Governor of Hadhramaut Governorate
- In office 31 July 2022 – 28 November 2025
- President: Rashad al-Alimi
- Preceded by: Faraj Al-Bahsani
- Succeeded by: Salem al-Khanbashi

Member of the House of Representatives
- Incumbent
- Assumed office 27 April 2003
- President: Ali Abdullah Saleh; Abdrabbuh Mansour Hadi; Rashad al-Alimi

Personal details
- Born: 1966 (age 59–60) Huraidhah district, Hadhramaut, Yemen
- Party: General People's Congress

Mabkhoot bin Madhi is a Yemeni politician who served as the governor of Hadhramaut Governorate from 2022 to 2025.

== Biography ==
Bin Madhi was born in 1966 in the Amd area of Huraidhah district, Hadhramaut. Holding a high school diploma, Bin Mahdi is a popular figure within Hadhramaut who has a prominent role in the ruling General People's Congress. He has been a member of the House of Representatives since 2003, when he was elected to Parliamentary District 155 in Hadhramaut.

Bin Madhi was appointed the governor of Hadhramaut on 31 July 2022, in Republican Decree, No. 18 of 2022, issued by President Rashad al-Alimi. He succeeded Faraj Al-Bahsani, who received a role in the Presidential Leadership Council months prior. In his first press conference on 7 August, he declared that his government would focus on providing increased services for the governorate and better relations with the media.

As governor, Madhi came under pressure due to his inability to resolve internal tensions in the governorate, which was controlled by numerous rival factions within the internationally recognized government of Yemen. He also came into conflict with interior minister Ibrahim Haidan due to this. Bin Madhi endorsed Saudi Arabia-hosted talks between leaders of the different factions of Hadhramaut in May 2023, urging unity and denying plans to exclude or sideline any party.

Bin Madhi was dismissed from his position as governor on 28 November 2025, his replacement being named as Salem al-Khanbashi.
