= Faraj al-Bahsani =

Yemeni general and politician (born 1955)

Faraj Al-Bahsani
- فرج البحسني
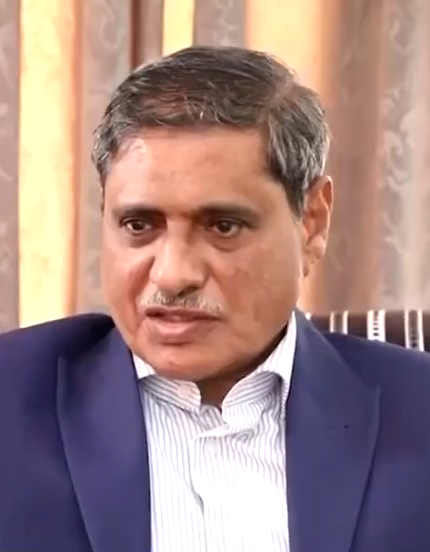
- Bahsani in 2020

Deputy Chairman of the Southern Transitional Council
- In office May 2023 – 9 January 2026
- Preceded by: Office created
- Succeeded by: Office abolished

Member of the Presidential Leadership Council
- In office 7 April 2022 – 15 January 2026

Governor of Hadramout
- In office 28 June 2017 – 31 July 2022
- Preceded by: Ahmed bin Bureik
- Succeeded by: Mabkhoot bin Madhi

Commander of the 2nd Military Region
- In office 2016 – 13 August 2022

Personal details
- Born: 1955 (age 70–71) Ghayl Ba Wazir District, Hadhramaut Governorate, Aden Protectorate

Faraj Salmin Al-Bahsani (born 1955; Arabic: فرج سالمين البحسني) is a Yemeni politician and military officer. He served a member of the Yemen's Presidential Leadership Council until his dismissal in 2026. He is a former commander of the second military region based in Hadramout. He was also the former governor of Hadramout.

== Biography ==
=== Early life, military career and exile ===
Bahsani was born in 1955 in Ghayl Ba Wazir, a town in Hadhramaut, where he received primary and intermediate education. He joined the military of South Yemen in 1971, and later travelled to the Soviet Union to study military science, receiving a bachelor's degree specializing in artillery and missiles in 1975. He returned to South Yemen and continued his military career in the artillery corps until 1979, when he began studying in the Soviet Union again at the Frunze Military Academy. He received a master's degree from the academy in 1983.

In his military career in South Yemen, Bahsani first served as an artillery battery commander in the al-Jalaa camp of Aden's al-Buraiqeh district. He later served as commander of the fire control platoon in the artillery battalion, staff officer of the artillery and missile corps, deputy commander of the artillery corps, and a senior artillery instructor at the Command and Staff College in Aden. After receiving his bachelor's in the Soviet Union, he served as an instructor and teacher at the Aden Military College's artillery department, commander of the Southern Artillery Corps and deputy director of the Command and Staff College from 1985 to 1986, and director of the Command and Staff College from 1987 to 1990.

After the unification of Yemen, Bahsani was appointed director of the Office of the Chief of the General Staff for Qualification and Training Affairs at the Ministry of Defense from 1990 to 1994. During the Yemeni civil war of 1994, he sided with the southern secessionists and was appointed commander of the Kharaz front west of Aden along the coast of the Bab el-Mandeb. After their defeat, he and many other secessionist leaders fled Yemen. With his military career over, he worked in a Gulf Arab state as a gas station manager for several years.

=== Return to Yemen ===
During the Yemeni civil war, as Yemeni government and Saudi-led coalition forces resecured most of Aden and Marib governorates in late 2015 following a Houthi offensive, the United Arab Emirates began to refocus its efforts towards reclaiming the coastal areas of Hadhramaut including Mukalla, which had been captured earlier in the year by al-Qaeda in the Arabian Peninsula. For this reason, Emirati officials managed to secure the return of Bahsani to Yemen, who received the rank of major general and was appointed to head the 2nd Military Region in November 2015, in order to train the UAE-backed Hadrami Elite Forces. He then led government-allied forces during the capture of Mukalla in April 2016.

While simultaneously holding the position of 2nd Military Region commander, Bahsani was appointed the governor of Hadhramaut in 2017 on the recommendation of Saudi Arabia. Although he was nominally in charge of the entire governorate, his true control only stretched across coastal Hadhramaut, which also fell in the jurisdiction of the 2nd Military Region. By the time of his appointment, Hadhramaut was controlled by the Southern Transitional Council on the coast and government-aligned forces further north. Bahsani maintained ties with both parties. Bahsani was described by the European Council on Foreign Relations as a Hadhrami-centric figure rather than a loyalist for the central government or the STC. Regardless, he kept good relations with the STC, the latter boasting a large presence the regional capital of Mukalla, while also utilizing his local reputation to amass acceptance of President Abdrabbuh Mansour Hadi's government and maintaining ties with Saudi Arabia and the UAE. His dedication towards relative neutrality and resolving disputes between local actors played a large part in preventing large-scale conflict between the different factions in the governorate by 2019 according to ACLED.

During an interview with Reuters in 2019, Bahsani spoke of the effects wrought by a rash of cyclones reaching the government in the previous two years, combined with a rise in civil war-related fighting which depleted much of Yemen's oil revenue.

Bahsani was dismissed from as Hadhramaut governor on 31 July 2022, his replacement being named as the UAE-linked Mabkhoot bin Mahdi. He initially showed intention of retaining a regional presence through his position as 2nd Military Region commander, but he was replaced in this role too on 13 August, significantly impacting his influence in the country.

== Career ==
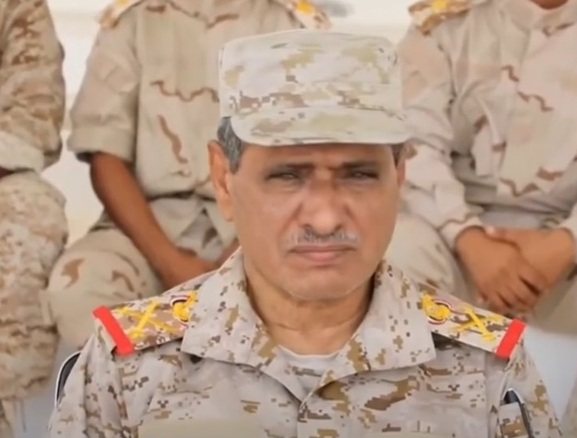
- Bahsani during his tenure of 2nd Military Region commander
  Member of the Presidential Leadership Council, 7 April 2022 – 15 January 2026
- Governor of Hadramout province, 28 June 2017 – 31 July 2022
- Commander of the second military region, 2016 – 13 August 2022
- Chief of Staff of the second military region, 2015–2016
