= Nukhba =

Nukhba (Arabic: نخبة) is an Arabic word meaning 'elite'. It may refer to various groups:

- An-Nukhba al-Shabwaniyya, the Shabwani Elite, a military unit in Yemen
- Jaysh al-Nukhba, a military unit in Syria
- Nukhba Force, a special forces unit of the Ezzedeen Al-Qassam Brigades.
