= Khalid al-Aruri =

Palestinian-Jordanian Islamic militant (1967–2020)

- Born: 25 July 1967; Ramallah, West Bank under Israeli Military Governorate
- Died: 14 June 2020 (aged 52) Idlib, Syria
- Allegiance: al-Qaeda
- Branch: Hurras al-Din
- Service years: 1990s–2020
- Conflicts: Syria; Syrian Civil War; Lebanon; Syrian Civil War spillover in Lebanon; Military intervention against ISIL; American-led intervention in Syria

Khalid Mustafa Khalifa al-Aruri (Arabic: خالد مصطفى خليفة العاروري; 25 July 1967 – 14 June 2020), known as Abu Al-Qassam and Abu Ashraf, was a Palestinian-Jordanian Islamic militant and a member of al-Qaeda who was the leader of the Hurras al-Din.

== History ==
Khalid al-Aruri was born on 25 July 1967, in Ramallah on the West Bank. He grew up in the city of Zarqa in Jordan and was a Jordanian citizen.

While in Zarqa he met Abu Musab al-Zarqawi and in 1989 both men traveled to Afghanistan, staying there until 1993. In 1991, he is said to have worked for the International Islamic Relief Organization. From 29 March 1994 until March 1999, they were imprisoned together in Jordan and al-Zarqawi founded his Bayt al-Imam organization. After their release, the two traveled again to Afghanistan where Al-Aruri become the commander of Al-Zarqawi's jihadi training camp near Herat.

The relation between al-Qa'ida top leader Saif al-Adel and Khalid al-Aruri goes back to 1999 when Abu Musab al-Zarqawi had meetings with the al-Qa'ida leadership in Kandahar before opening his training camp near Herat. According to al-Adel, al-Zarqawi "used to travel with Khalid al-Aruri and Sulayman Darwish Abu-al-Ghadiyah."

After Zarqawi and his men left Afghanistan in 2001, al-Aruri was one of Zarqawi's trusted inner circle advisors and became one of the key liaisons with Ansar al-Islam in Northern Iraq. Al-Aruri operated as al-Zarqawi's quartermaster and was in charge of training camps in Northern Iraq. Abu al-Qassam participated in an important meeting with people close to Mullah Krekar in August 2003 in Tehran.

On 5 February 2003, Al-Aruri as Abu Ashraf was mentioned in the speech of Secretary of State Colin Powell to the U.N. Security Council. As Abu Ashraf, he was shown on a partial organization chart which was linked to four cells operating in Europe. Cited were a "UK poison cell" a "Spain cell" a "French poison cell", and a "possible Italy cell." Former Director of Intelligence and Counterintelligence at the U.S. Department of Energy and CIA veteran Rolf Mowatt-Larssen stated that "Secretary Powell’s information used for this part of speech proved to be accurate in the course of events."

=== Arrest in Iran ===
Al-Aruri moved to Iran and was one of al-Zarqawi's main facilitators there. In a Moroccan investigation into the March 2003 Casablanca bombings, Al-Aruri surfaced as a financier of the attacks as he had sent U.S. $70,000 to the Moroccan Aziz Hummani. In 2003 he was arrested in Tehran.

=== Release by Iran ===
In March 2015, Khalid al-Aruri was released by Iran together with other high level al-Qa'ida leaders including Saif al-Adel, Abu Khayr al-Masri and Abdullah Ahmed Abdullah.

In September 2015, Khalid al-Aruri went to Syria working for al-Qaeda. He confirmed his presence there in 2017, when he released a eulogy for Abu Khayr al-Masri.

== Personal life ==
Al-Aruri married Alia, a sister of the late Abu Musab al-Zarqawi, while in Herat. He was also known by his aliases Abu al-Qassam, Abu Ashraf and Abu Jabal.

== Death ==
On 14 June 2020, a U.S. drone strike killed Khalid al-Aruri and Bilal al-Sanaani who were driving a vehicle in Idlib, Syria. The munition used on the vehicle was probably the kinetic Hellfire R9X missile that uses blades to eviscerate its target rather than an explosive warhead, as there was no explosion and al-Aruri's vehicle was relatively intact.
