= Huraidhah district =

Coordinates: 15°23′N 48°18′E

Huraidhah District
- District
- Interactive map of Huraidhah District
- Country: Yemen
- Governorate: Hadhramaut

Population (2021)
  - Total: 26,340
- Time zone: UTC+3 (Yemen Standard Time)

Huraidhah District is a district of the Hadhramaut Governorate, Yemen. As of 2021, the district had a population of 26,340 inhabitants.
