= Hadhrami Elite Forces =

- قوات النخبة الحضرمية
- Logo
- Active: 2016–2026
- Country: Yemen
- Type: Special operations forces
- Mottos: "حضرموت لنا" "Hadhramout is ours"

Commanders
- Current commander: Major General Pilot Fayez Qahtan Al-Tamimi

The Hadhrami Elite Forces (HEF; Arabic: قوات النخبة الحضرمية, romanized: quwwā an-nukhba al-Ḥaḍramiyya) was a special operations force formed by the Arab coalition forces, under the supervision of the United Arab Emirates technical support and with funding from Saudi Arabia, to liberate the city of Mukalla from al-Qaeda.

== Composition ==
The Hadhrami Elite Forces consisted of soldiers belonging to tribes who supported legitimacy in exile as well as local recruits from Hadhramaut Governorate. These forces were distinguished by the fact that they were formed from those belonging to Hadhramaut Governorate only, which meant that Yemenis from other regions were not allowed to join them. Emirati security officers trained the new security force, which was managed by the second Military Region in the coastal areas. It was provided with tanks, weapons, and logistical materiel, which were mostly provided by Saudi Arabia.

The Hadhrami Elite Forces recruited both from the Interior (Wadis) and Coastal regions of Hadhramaut and as of 2023 they had an army of 7,000 men. They sought a higher degree of autonomy for Hadhramaut and were aligned with the STC.

The Hadhrami Elite Forces established a strong control over much of Hadhramaut, controlling Mukalla, the capital city of the Hadhramaut Governorate and continued to expand towards many other Coastal districts.

== History ==
In early 2016 the United Arab Emirates established the "Elite Forces" as part of its "tribal strategy" to incorporate local tribal militias into the architecture of the Security Belt. Two units where created, the Hadhrami Elite Forces and the Shabwani Elite Forces with both units being trained in the al-Khalidiyya and Ghayl Bin Yamin camps in Hadhramaut.

The UAE also sought to create "Suqutri Elite Forces" and "Mehri Elite Forces", with 4,000 tribal fighters trained in Hadhramaut being transferred to Mahra, and the governor of Socotra being supportive of the UAE and Al-Islah, however, these units were never created. The UAE established three HEF brigades, led by former Yemeni army officers, members of the Southern Movement, or tribal elites, and where largely an extension of Hadhramaut governor, Faraj al-Bahsani.

=== Battle of Mukalla ===
On April 24, 2016, the Hadhrami elite forces, supported by the Arab Coalition to Support Legitimacy in Yemen, took control of the city of Mukalla, the administrative capital of Hadramaut Governorate and the Hadhramaut region, from al-Qaeda in the Arabian Peninsula. This is the first time that military forces entered the city since al-Qaeda took control in April 2015. About 2,000 soldiers from the Hadhrami elite forces, supported by Saudi and Emirati special forces, moved into Mukalla and took control of the port and airport, with air support from Saudi Air Force aircraft, and set up checkpoints in various parts of the city.

The Arab Coalition to Support Legitimacy announced that it had killed more than 800 al-Qaeda militants in the Arabian Peninsula, while other reports indicate that al-Qaeda militants withdrew after minor clashes.

=== After Mukalla ===
After securing control of Mukalla the HEF maintained control of coastal Hadramawt, placing Mukalla port and the Bir Ali oil terminal under UAE influence.

The HEF continued counter-terrorism operations, reaching a peak in 2018, before gradually scaling back these efforts and halting them entirely in 2022. Shortly after Major General Faiz Mansur al-Tamimi was named the new commander of the HEF.
