= Hajr district =

Hajr District مديرية حجر
- District
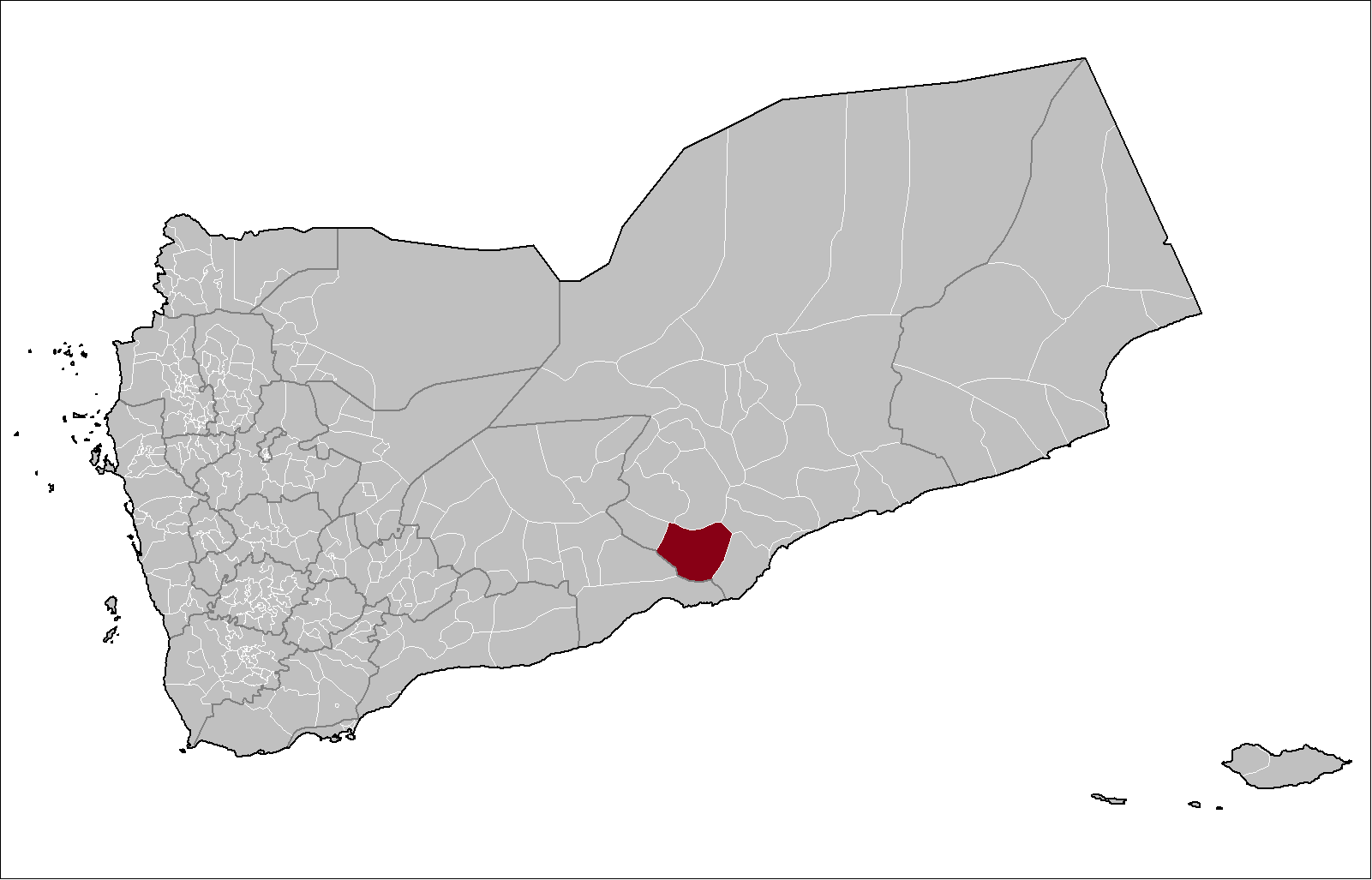
- The district highlighted in Yemen
- Coordinates: 14°20′N 48°20′E
- Country: Yemen
- Governorate: Hadhramaut

Population (2021)
  - Total: 40,285
- Time zone: UTC+3 (Yemen Standard Time)

Hajr District (Arabic: مديرية حجر) is a district of the Hadhramaut Governorate, Yemen. As of 2021, the district had a population of 40,285 inhabitants.

== Climate ==
Climate data for Hajr
Month	Jan	Feb	Mar	Apr	May	Jun	Jul	Aug	Sep	Oct	Nov	Dec	Year
Mean daily maximum °C (°F)	19.3 (66.7)	20.3 (68.5)	22.1 (71.8)	23.6 (74.5)	25.7 (78.3)	27.1 (80.8)	25.9 (78.6)	25.2 (77.4)	24.4 (75.9)	22.8 (73.0)	20.7 (69.3)	19.5 (67.1)	23.1 (73.5)
Mean daily minimum °C (°F)	7.1 (44.8)	8.4 (47.1)	10.5 (50.9)	12.6 (54.7)	14.7 (58.5)	15.9 (60.6)	16.1 (61.0)	15.3 (59.5)	14.4 (57.9)	10.7 (51.3)	8.4 (47.1)	7.8 (46.0)	11.8 (53.3)
Average precipitation mm (inches)	11 (0.4)	10 (0.4)	26 (1.0)	21 (0.8)	10 (0.4)	4 (0.2)	11 (0.4)	20 (0.8)	7 (0.3)	1 (0.0)	9 (0.4)	8 (0.3)	138 (5.4)
Source: Climate-data.org
