= Ghayl Ba Wazir =

Coordinates: 14°47′N 49°22′E

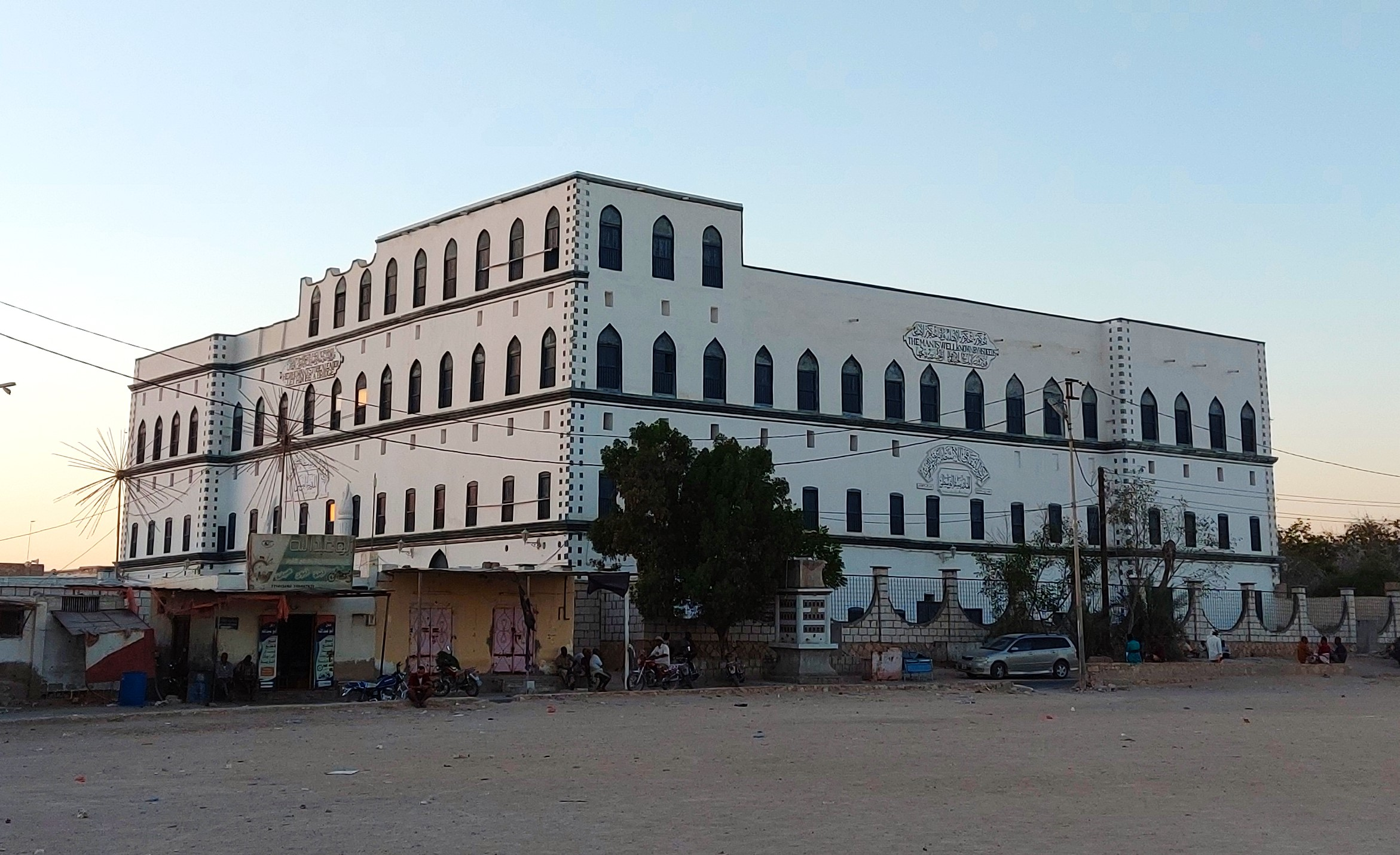
- Al-Azhar Fort of Ghail Ba Wazir
- Interactive map of Ghayl Ba Wazir
- Country: Yemen
- Governorate: Hadhramaut
- Established: early 14th century
- Time zone: UTC+3 (Yemen Standard Time)

Ghayl Ba Wazir (Arabic: غيل باوزير) or Gjail Ba Wazir is a city in eastern Yemen. It is located in the Hadhramaut Governorate.

== Economy ==
As of 1920, Ghayl Ba Wazir was producing tobacco. The tobacco, called humuni, is brown and coarse and has been described as having a "very strong flavour."
