= 2013 Iranian diplomat kidnapping =

Hostage taking in Sana'a, Yemen

Nour Ahmad Nikbakht, an administrative staff member of the Iranian Embassy in Sana'a, Yemen, was kidnapped by Al Qaeda in the Arabian Peninsula in the Yemeni capital on 21 July 2013. Nikbakht was abducted while leaving his home in Sana'a by a gunman who was a member of al-Qaeda. He was held hostage for two years and released in March 2015 in exchange for five al-Qaeda leaders. He returned home safely on March 5, 2015.

== Abduction ==
On 21 July 2013, Nikbakht left his house in Sana'a and went to work. On his way to the embassy, unidentified gunmen blocked the road, forced him out of his car and abducted him, taking him to an unknown location. After he was liberated, Nour-Ahamd stated: "I was kidnapped by unknown gunmen and terrorists as I left my home to go to work."

According to the Yemeni tribunal, Nour-Ahmad Nikbakht was held by al-Qaeda militants in an area between the southern provinces of Shabwa and Baida. Nour-Ahmad described his ordeal: "I was in an extremely difficult situation and I did not know what was happening in the outside world."

== Official statements ==
=== Before release ===
On 14 August 2013, foreign ministry of Yemen claimed that it had no clues as to the whereabouts of the abducted Iranian diplomat.

Hossein Amirabdollahian, deputy of foreign minister, mentioned that a special group was formed at the Iran and Yemen foreign ministry to solve the issue. Also, he said: "the Yemeni government is responsible for the Iranian diplomat's safety and his safe return to the country."

The Iranian foreign ministry summoned the Yemeni chargé d'affaires at the Tehran twice and announced that Yemen was responsible for Nikbakht's safety.

=== After release ===
One day before the release, Iranian officials announced that Nikbakht was healthy.

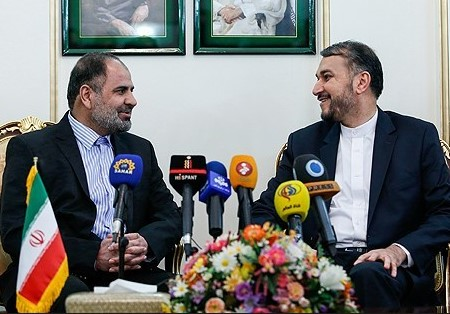
Meeting between Hossein Amir-Abdollahian and Nour Ahmad Nikbakht after his return to Iran.

Hossein Amir-Abdollahian, deputy of foreign minister, explained that intelligence officers carried out a difficult and complicated rescue operation. He did not give more details about the operation.

Mahmoud Alavi, intelligence minister of Iran, declared that the rescue operation occurred with the lowest possible casualties. Also, Alavi said: "Tehran had refused the conditions set by the terrorists" for the diplomat's release."

== Return ==
On March 5, 2015, he moved to Mehrabad international airport and returned to his family, where he was greeted by his family and some Iranian officials.

== See also ==
- 1982 kidnapping of Iranian diplomats
