= Ghayl Ba Wazir district =

Ghayl Ba Wazir District مديرية غيل با وزير
- District
- Interactive map of Ghayl Ba Wazir District
- Country: Yemen
- Governorate: Hadhramaut Governorate

Population (2021)
  - Total: 77,548
- Time zone: UTC+3 (Yemen Standard Time)

Ghayl Ba Wazir District (Arabic: مديرية غيل باوزير) is a district of the Hadhramaut Governorate, Yemen. As of 2021, the district had a population of 77,548 people.
