= Amd district =

Amd District
- District
- Interactive map of Amd District
- Coordinates: 15°10′N 47°55′E
- Country: Yemen
- Governorate: Hadhramaut

Population (2021)
  - Total: 31,102
- Time zone: UTC+3 (Yemen Standard Time)

Amd District is a district of the Hadhramaut Governorate, Yemen. As of 2021, the district had a population of 31,102 inhabitants.
