= Abdullah Ahmed Abdullah =

Egyptian al-Qaeda member (1963–2020)

Abdullah Ahmed Abdullah عبد الله أحمد عبد الله
- Born: 6 June 1963; Gharbia Governorate, Egypt
- Died: 7 August 2020 (aged 57); Pasdaran, Tehran, Iran
- Cause of death: Drive-by shooting by Israeli Mossad Kidon
- Known for: Being an FBI Most Wanted Terrorist; 1998 United States embassy bombings

Abdullah Ahmed Abdullah (Arabic: عبد الله أحمد عبد الله; 6 June 1963 – 7 August 2020; nom de guerre Abu Mohammed al-Masri) was a high-ranking Egyptian member of al-Qaeda. He has been described as al-Qaeda's most experienced operational planner and was said to be the second-in-command in the organization at the time of his death.

Abdullah was one of the 22 original members of the United States FBI list of Most Wanted Terrorists. The State Department, through the Rewards for Justice Program, had offered up to US$10 million for information on his location. He was wanted by the United States for his alleged role in the 1998 American embassy bombings in Dar es Salaam, Tanzania, and Nairobi, Kenya. The FBI also gave other names used by Abdullah as Abu Mariam, Mustafa Abu Mariam Khaled, Abu Mohamed Al-Masri, Azayet, and Saleh, a possible abbreviation of Saleh Gamal.

On 14 November 2020, The New York Times reported that Abdullah had been killed on 7 August 2020 in Tehran, Iran, by Israeli Mossad operatives at the behest of the United States. On 12 January 2021, the United States Secretary of State Mike Pompeo confirmed the death of Abdullah.

== Biography ==
Abdullah Ahmed Abdullah was born in the Gharbia Governorate of Egypt on 6 June 1963. According to Abdullah, he was once a professional football player for the Ghazl El-Mehalla team in Egypt. Having joined the jihadist movement during the Soviet–Afghan War, he was not allowed to return to Egypt, and remained in Afghanistan, joining Osama bin Laden.

In 1992, he helped Saif al-Adel in providing intelligence and military training to those associated with al-Qaeda in Somalia and Sudan. His trainees were among the group who fought against the Americans during the Battle of Mogadishu in 1993.

Between 1996 and 1998 he operated training camps in Afghanistan for al-Qaeda. Abdullah was responsible for forging a passport for Mohammed Saddiq Odeh so he could get from Pakistan to Afghanistan and meet Osama bin Laden before the bombings of US embassies on 7 August 1998 in Kenya and Tanzania that killed 224 civilians and wounded more than 5,000 others.

He fled Nairobi, Kenya, on 6 August 1998, to Karachi, Pakistan. He then travelled to Afghanistan. In 2000, Abdullah became a member of the majlis al-shura, al-Qaeda's leadership council. A former Israeli intelligence official accused him of ordering the 2002 Mombasa attacks.

In 2003, he moved to the Iranian Baluchestan province where he was later detained and placed under house arrest. He was released by Iran in March 2015 with al-Qaeda leaders Saif al-Adel and Abu Khayr al-Masri in exchange for the release of Nour Ahmad Nikbakht, an Iranian diplomat who was being held in Yemen. A New York Times source said he remained in Tehran, living under the protection of the Islamic Revolutionary Guard Corps and later the Ministry of Intelligence and Security.

== Family ==
Abdullah was married to a daughter of Ahmad Salama Mabruk, with whom he had three daughters. One of his daughters, named Maryam, had been married to Hamza bin Laden (son of Al-Qaeda leader Osama bin Laden). Maryam was also killed in the attack that killed her father.

== Death ==
The New York Times reported on 14 November 2020 that Abdullah, while driving his car in the Pasdaran neighborhood of Tehran, Iran, on 7 August 2020, was shot to death by Israeli Mossad operatives from Kidon, a unit informally known as the "Tip of the Spear", on a motorcycle, at the behest of the United States. Kidon is a highly secretive unit within Mossad, the external intelligence agency of Israel. Abdullah's daughter, who was the widow to former al-Qaeda leader Osama bin Laden's late son, Hamza bin Laden, was also reportedly killed in the attack. Reuters had previously received similar information from a security official in Afghanistan, but could not independently receive confirmation of the Times reporting via US or Israeli officials. Iranian news sources at the time of his death claimed the identities of the dead pair to be of a Lebanese academic by the name of "Habib Dawood", who had ties to Hezbollah, and his daughter. Afghan news station Shamshad News also claimed his death.

Iran denied the New York Times report; its Foreign Ministry spokesman Saeed Khatibzadeh said in a statement that the United States and Israel sometimes "try to tie Iran to such groups by lying and leaking false information to the media".

Ha'aretz reported "According to intelligence sources in Israel, revelation of the assassination of Abdullah Ahmed Abdullah, also known as Abu Mohammed al-Masri, is meant to convey a message to President-elect Joe Biden, who intends to renew negotiations with Iran. Israel wishes to portray Tehran as a terror incubator for the organization that was responsible for the September 11 attacks."

“This exposes the regime in Iran as one that provides a haven for the organization that's most significant to the United States,” said a former senior defense official. "It's undeniably convenient for Iran to operate Al-Qaida against the United States because of sanctions or to exact a price for the assassination of Soleimani,” the official said."

On 12 January 2021, the United States secretary of state Mike Pompeo confirmed the death of Abdullah Ahmed Abdullah.

== See also ==
- Abu Muhsin al-Masri
- Ayman al-Zawahiri
