= Yabuth district =

Coordinates: 14°45′N 47°45′E

Yabuth District
- District
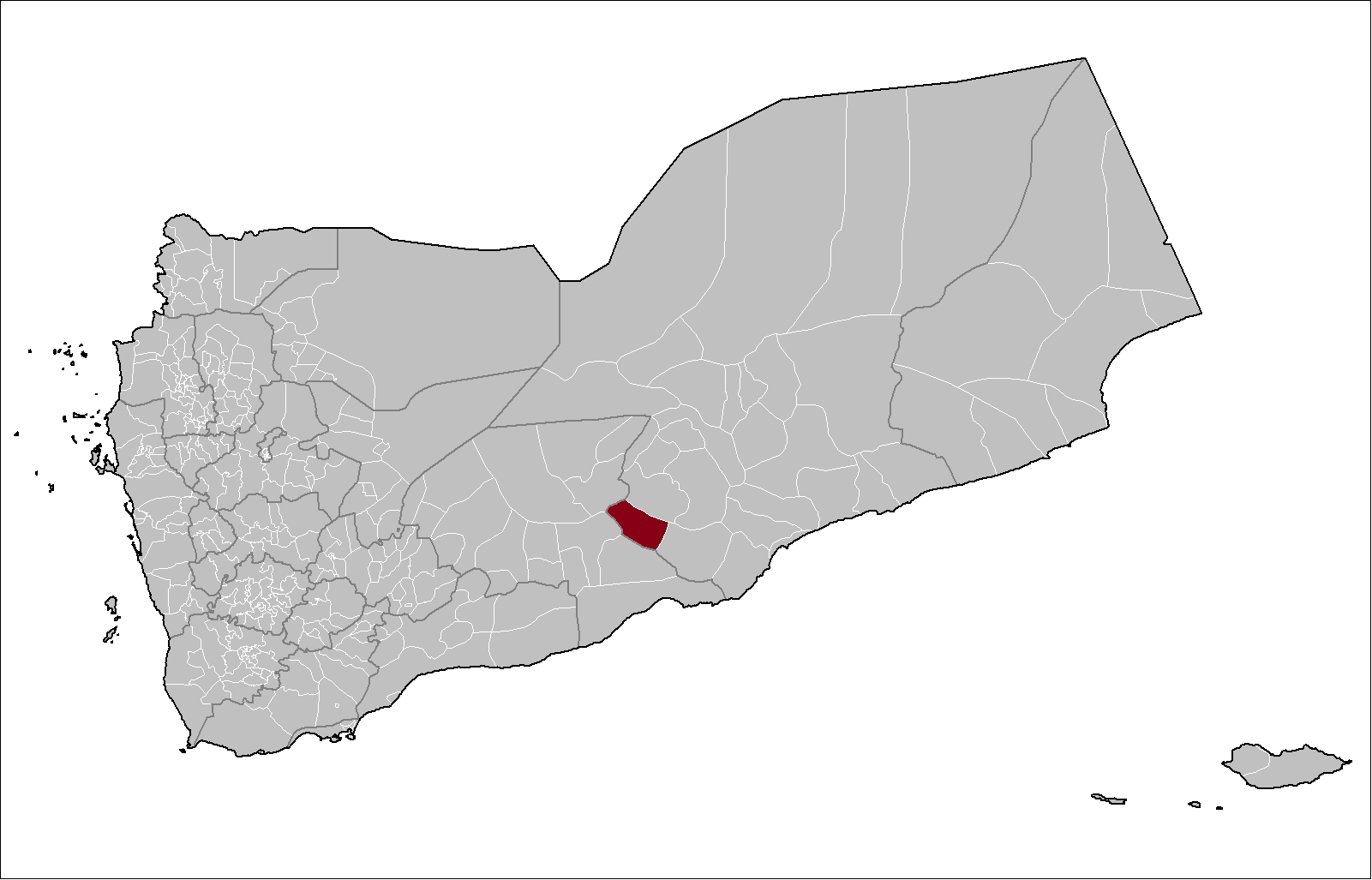
- The district highlighted in Yemen
- Country: Yemen
- Governorate: Hadhramaut

Population (2021)
  - Total: 15,442
- Time zone: UTC+3 (Yemen Standard Time)

Yabuth District is a district of the Hadhramaut Governorate, Yemen. As of 2021, the district had a population of 15,442 inhabitants.
