= Shabwani Elite =

Special forces unit operating in Yemen

Forces from the unit have been spotted carrying the flag of South Yemen in August 2017.

The Shabwani Elite (Arabic: النخبة الشبوانية; An-Nukhba al-Shabwaniyya) were a military unit operating in the Shabwah Governorate of Yemen, mainly against Al-Qaeda in the Arabian Peninsula (AQAP). The unit consisted of at least 6,000 troops and controlled the majority of the province as of early November 2017, according to its commander Mohamed Salem al-Qumishi.

Armed and trained by the United Arab Emirates, the Shabwani Elite began a large operation against AQAP on August 2, 2017, with the backing of Emirati and American forces, capturing the city of Ataq in the process.
