= Abu Khayr al-Masri =

Egyptian al-Qaeda member (1957–2017)

Ahmad Hasan Abu al-Khayr al-Masri أحمد حسن أبو الخير المصري

Deputy Emir of Al-Qaeda
- In office 12 June 2015 – 26 February 2017
- Preceded by: Nasir al-Wuhayshi
- Succeeded by: Abdullah Ahmed Abdullah

Personal details
- Born: Abdullah Abd al-Rahman Muhammad Rajab Abd al-Rahman; 3 November 1957 Kafr el-Sheikh, Egypt
- Died: 26 February 2017 (aged 59) Al-Mastumah, Idlib Governorate, Syria
- Occupation: Deputy leader of al-Qaeda

Military service
- Allegiance: Al-Qaeda (1990s–2017)

Abdullah Abd al-Rahman Muhammad Rajab Abd al-Rahman (Arabic: عبد الله عبد الرحمن محمد رجب عبد الرحمن), known as Ahmad Hasan Abu al-Khayr al-Masri (Arabic: أحمد حسن أبو الخير المصري), (3 November 1957 – 26 February 2017) was an Egyptian al-Qaeda leader who had been described as the general deputy to al-Qaeda leader Ayman al-Zawahiri.

== History ==
Al-Masri was a member of Egyptian Islamic Jihad alongside Ayman al-Zawahiri and fled the country in the mid-1980s along with many other Islamic militants. He headed al-Qaeda's political committee and was a member of the Shura Council. He has been described as operating as a "trusted lieutenant" of the leader of al-Qaeda, Ayman al-Zawahiri with whom al-Masri worked in Sudan and Afghanistan.

=== Arrest ===
He left Afghanistan after the September 11 attacks and prior to the United States invasion of Afghanistan. He fled to Iran, where he was arrested in Sistan and Baluchestan province in April 2003. Also arrested alongside him were other senior al-Qaeda leaders including Saif al-Adel, Abdullah Ahmed Abdullah and Sulaiman Abu Ghaith. According to a statement that Sulaiman Abu Ghaith gave to the Federal Bureau of Investigation, four al-Qaeda leaders were first jailed in an Iranian intelligence building in Tehran for approximately one year and eight months.

== Release by Iran ==
In September 2015 it was reported that Abu Khayr al-Masri was released by Iran in March 2015 together with other al-Qaeda leaders including Saif al-Adel and Abdullah Ahmed Abdullah in a prisoner exchange. He was reported to have then traveled to Syria with three men to join the Al-Nusra Front branch of al-Qaeda.

== Syria ==
On 28 July 2016, the Al-Minaret al-Bayda media wing of the Syrian al-Qaeda branch Jabhat al-Nusra released an audio message from him claiming that the Nusra front had cut all connections with al-Qaeda and renamed it the Fateh al-Sham Front.

== Death ==
Reports surfaced on 26 February 2017 that al-Masri had been killed in a U.S. airstrike in his car in Al-Mastumah in the Syrian province of Idlib. There was no immediate official confirmation from either the United States or al-Qaeda. Guardian journalists Tom McCarthy and Martin Chulov later reported that jihadist leaders confirmed that al-Masri was killed in the drone strike. The airstrike also killed another Tahrir al-Sham militant traveling in the car. A US intelligence official and al-Qaeda later confirmed that al-Masri had been killed in the strike, which used a variant of the AGM-114 Hellfire missile. This weapon, known as the AGM-114 R9X, lacks an explosive warhead. Instead, it deploys six blades just before impact so it may kill its target while reducing the likelihood of harm to people nearby.
