= Abyan conflict =

Clashes of the Yemeni Civil War

- Part of the South Yemen insurgency
- Map showing Yemeni army offensive against Al-Qaeda in Abyan
Date	22 February 2016 – 19 August 2018 (2 years, 5 months and 4 weeks)
Location	Abyan Governorate, Yemen
Result	Cabinet of Yemen Victory: AQAP is expelled from all of Abyan in early 2016; AQAP militants return to Abyan in mid 2016; As of late February 2017, AQAP remains in control of Lawdar, Shuqraq, Al Mahfid, and other smaller areas in Abyan; AQAP expelled from Wadea in September 2017, and from Al-Mafhad in March 2018; As of March 14, 2018, AQAP only controls or contests 20% of Abyan; On March 31, 2018, government officials announced that the security situation and the front had stabilized

Belligerents
Al-Qaeda: AQAP; Local militias: Ali Aqel gang; Islamic State of Iraq and the Levant – Yemen Province (limited involvement)	Yemen: Military of Yemen; Supported by: United States; United Arab Emirates (2016–17); Southern Movement (2016–17); Sudan (2016–19) Southern Transitional Council; Supported by: United Arab Emirates	Revolutionary Committee/Supreme Political Council: Houthi fighters; Security Forces (pro-Saleh until December 2017); Republican Guard (Until December 2017)

Commanders and leaders
Qasim al-Raymi (Emir of AQAP) †; Tariq Al-Fadhli (leader of Fadhli tribesmen loyal to AQAP); Tawfiq Belaidi (Emir of Zinjibar); Abu Anas al-Sanani (Deputy Emir of Zinjibar); Aref Ahmad Abdullah Harrahah Al Yafei (Emir of Jaʿār); Abdul Hakim Amer (commander); Abi Salem al-Taizi (Emir of Mansoura); Abi Abbas al-Hadrami (commander); Ali Salem Mkeda (commander); Mohammed Salem Mkeda (commander); Nasser Abdullah al-Dabani (commander) casualties: Usayd al-Adani (Emir of Abyan) †; Abdullah Saeed Habibat (commander) †; Khaled Abdul Nabi (commander) (surrendered); Abu Osama Al-Yasiri (official) (POW); Jalal Al-Seydi (Emir of Lawdar) †; Ali Saleh Al-Buhaith Al-Fathani (field commander) †; Abu Bilal al-Lawdari (bodyguard of Jalal Al-Seydi) †; Abdullah Al-Zaidi (Emir of Al-Ain) †; Osama Haidar (Emir of Aden Governorate) †; Mohamed Tahar (commander) †; Qasim Khalil (commander) †; Harithah al-Waqari (Deputy Emir of Abyan) †; Abu Sameh al-Zinjibari (Deputy of Abu Hamza al Zinjibari) †; Waddah Muhammed Amsouda (commander) †; Abu Obeida Al-Dhamji (commander) †; Ahmed Ali Saana (official) †; Al-Abali (field commander) †; Mukhtar Jami (commander) †; Ibrahim al-Adani (chief financial officer in Abyan) †; Arif Adel Hassan Habib (suicide bomber) †; Abu Asid al Marqishi (militant) †; Nasser Mohammed Jubah al-Maqni (commander) (executed); Ahmed Al-Khader bin Lazraq (commander) (executed); Abu Abdullah Al-Kazemi (bombmaker) (executed); Al-Khader Ali Ahmed Basaree (Emir of Al-Wadea and Abyan) (DOW); Mohammed Saleh Al-Awsiji (Emir of Al Hisn) †; Aqil Matali (Emir of Lawdar) (POW); Ali Saleh Dehis (Emir of mudiyah) (POW); Mohammed Nasser Dehis (Deputy Emir of mudiyah) (POW); Ahmed Abdul Nabi (commander) †; Mohamed Abdul Nabi (fighter) (POW); Haitham al-‘Arr (official) (POW); Abdullah al-Huqairi (official) (POW); al-Khader Ahmad Hussein Al-Darmali (Bombmaker) (POW); Mohammed Saleh Saeed al-Awlaki (commander) (POW); Salem Ali Ahmed Al-Zaidi (commander) (POW); Nayef Al-Damaji Abu Obaidah (Emir of Lawdar) †; Salah Hadi Al-Lawdari (fighter) †; Shuaib Al-Lawdari (fighter) †; Nader Al-Jaru (fighter) †; Shamil Al-Jadani (fighter) †; Abdullah Al-Saqi (official) (POW); Fayez Saleh Saeed Faya (official) (POW); Ahmed Al-Khader Al-Waleedi (commander) †; Mohammed Awad Mahfar (commander) (surrendered); Abu Salem Al-Walidi (Chief financial officer for Abyan) (POW); Saleh al-Barak (commander) †; Abdu Majda (commander) (surrendered); Hadi Al-Saeeli (commander) (surrendered); Majed Khabtiyeh (commander) (POW); Alaa Ahmed (commander) (POW); Saleh Ahmed Lara (Emir of Al-Mafhad) (surrendered); Nasser Mohsen Basabreen (Deputy Emir of Al-Mafhad) †; Nasser Mubarak al-Muhail (official) (POW); Amjad al-Wahti (commander) †; Hilmi Aqil (Deputy Emir of Mansoura) (POW); Hussein Ali Basaree (commander) †; Murad al-Doubly al-Batani al-Maki (commander) †; Sami Younes Aiash (commander) †; Abu al-Miqdad al-Dhumari (chief of medical office) †; Yasser al-Jahidi (commander) †; Abu Salem al-Adani (commander) †; Abu Hamza al-Shabwani (commander) †; Ali Aqel Radwan Qanan (ISIL commander) †	(Yemen) Abu Bakr Hussein Salem (Governor of Abyan) (Yemen) Abdel Aziz Al-Hamzah (Deputy Governor of Abyan) (Yemen) Abdullah Al-Fadhli (Security chief of Abyan) (WIA) (Yemen) Ahmed Saif Al-Mahrami (commander of fourth military region) (Yemen) Brig.Gene. Nasr Al-Atawi (Head of 15th brigade) (Yemen) Maj. Gen. Nasser Abdullah Barwis (chief of military staff of the fourth military region) (Yemen) Faisal Al-Dabiya (Director General of the Office of Governor of Abyan) (Yemen) Colonel Ahmad Amabed Nasser (Security director of Abyan (2017-present)) (Yemen) Khader Al-Saeedi (former Governor of Abyan) (Yemen) Major General Ahmed Saif Yafei (Commander of Fourth military region) (Saudi Arabia) Maj Gen Fadhl Baash (Special forces commander) (Saudi Arabia) Shaker Al-Ghadeer (officer in 111th brigade) (Saudi Arabia) Brigadier General Nasser Ali Hadi (Saudi Arabia) Ali Deeb Boumhal Alkazmi (Saudi Arabia) Brig. Gen. Haidara Lahtal (Saudi Arabia) Staff Col. Mohammed Ali al Muazeb (Commander of 15th brigade (2016-2017)) (Saudi Arabia) Colonel Abdullah Ahmad Subaihi (Commander of 15th brigade (2017-present)) (Saudi Arabia) Brig. Gen. Mohammed Hussein al Bukhaiti (commander of 111th brigade) (Saudi Arabia) Brig. Gen. Mohammed Abdullah al Shamba (Commander in 115th brigade) (Saudi Arabia) Staff Brig. Gen. Faisal Rajab (Commander in 119th brigade) (Saudi Arabia) Nasser Ali Basmayeh (Commander of 119th brigade) (Saudi Arabia) Colonel Nasser Mahdi Abdullah (Saudi Arabia) Major General Ali Nasser Lakhma (Deputy interior minister) (Saudi Arabia) Abdul Alim Abdul Jalil (137th brigade commander) (Saudi Arabia) Sheikh Mohammed Ghaleb Afifi (Saudi Arabia) Brig Ahmed Mohammed Al-Shubaili (115th brigade commander) (WIA) (Saudi Arabia) Bassam Al-Mihdhar (official) (Saudi Arabia) Maj. Gen. Fadl Hassan (commander of 4th Military region) (Saudi Arabia) Colonel Abdul Qader Al-Jaari (chief of staff of 103rd brigade) (Saudi Arabia) Brigadier General Saleh Ali Hassan (Chief of Staff of the 4th Military Region) (Saudi Arabia) Major General Mahmoud Ahmed Salem Al-Subaihi (Commander of 4th military region) (Saudi Arabia) Ahmed Nasser Saeed (Saudi Arabia) Ahmed Taleb Al Rabie (Saudi Arabia) Mohammed Al-Fulin (Saudi Arabia) Ali Omar Saeed al-Kazemi (Saudi Arabia) Sheikh Walid bin Nasser Al-Fadhli (Saudi Arabia) Brig. Gen. Nasser Abed Rabbo Mohammed (commander in 115th brigade) (Saudi Arabia) Moin Ahmed Ali (head of the rescue committee ) (Saudi Arabia) Nasser Al-Dhamji (commander in 115th brigade) (Saudi Arabia) Mohammed bin Mohammed (Head of Intelligence in Abyan) (Saudi Arabia) Brigadier General Ahmed Salem Al Wadi (Saudi Arabia) Brigadier General Rukn Abdullah Hussein Al-Qaqai (Commander of 115th brigade) (Saudi Arabia) Brig. Gen. Ali Qumali (commander of 103rd brigade) (Saudi Arabia) Colonel Waqn al-Nub (Saudi Arabia) Qaisar Al-Aidarous (Saudi Arabia) Abdul Razzaq Sultan (Saudi Arabia) Mohammad Mana (Saudi Arabia) Abdullah al-Wahid (Saudi Arabia) Colonel Ali Saeed Al Amisi (Saudi Arabia) Colonel Ali Ahmed Hafin (commander of special security forces) (Saudi Arabia) Ameen Faisal (security chief of Khanfar) (Saudi Arabia) Nasser Nasser Marsa (commander of the operations of the 119th Brigade) (Saudi Arabia) Sheikh Ahmed Salem Al-Aseeli (WIA) (Saudi Arabia) Hussein Ahmed ali (Saudi Arabia) Al-Khader Hamsan Al-Audhali (Saudi Arabia) Sabri Ali (Saudi Arabia) Abdullah Abdulsalam al-Qabli (115th brigade official) (WIA) (Saudi Arabia) Brigadier General Sanad al-Misari (5th brigade official) (Saudi Arabia) Lieutenant Colonel Samir Al-Hayyed (Saudi Arabia) Brigadier General Mohammed Al-Mursa (5th brigade commander) Casualties: (Yemen) Abd Rabbo Hussein (General of 15th brigade) †; (Saudi Arabia) Lieutenant Colonel Muhanna bin Saad Al-Baiz (pilot) †; (Saudi Arabia) Colonel Abdullah Shamba (Anti-AQAP militia leader) †; (Saudi Arabia) Haidara Daha (POW); (Saudi Arabia) Rushdi al Alwani (executed); (Saudi Arabia) Abdullah Khader Hussein (executed); (Saudi Arabia) Nasser Ali Nasser (DOW); (Saudi Arabia) Ali Abdul Hakim Daraan †; (Saudi Arabia) Ali Saleh Haydara Al-Awd †; (Saudi Arabia) Yasser al-Amoudi (WIA) (POW); (Yemen) Al-Khader Ahmed Mohammed Al-Shubaili (Army soldier) †; (Yemen) Mahdhar Abdul (leader of Popular committees in Laedar) †; (Yemen) Saeed Salim al-Mul (Army colonel) †; Colonel Ali Ahmed Al-Awad; Col. Salim Al Muhathithi; Sheikh Abdur Rab Al-Naqib; Ahmad al-Rabizi; Abdullatif Al-Sayed; Ahmed Hamid Al-Marqashi; Ahmed Mansour Al-Marqashi; Amin al-Saqqaf (WIA); Ali Al-Fadhli (WIA); Mohammed Al-oban; Mohammed al-Nakhbi; Mazen Junaidi; Mokhtar Al-Nubi; Abdul Rahman al-Shanini; Mokhtar Mohammed Haydan Al-Habashi Al-Audhali; Munir Abu Al-Yamamah; Abdul Razzaq Al-Jordemi (WIA); Mahmoud Shamba (Shuqrah al-Hizam company commander); Abdul Rahman al-Shanini (Rapid Deployment Force commander of Khanfar); Hamza al-Mahouri; Col Fawaz Al-Shabahi; Saleh Al-Amiri Abu Qahtan; Abu Raghad Shaye; Omar Jardana Casualties: Nasser Saleh Al-Jaari 'Jeddo' †; Abdulhakim Omair †; Hussein Ahmed Qomata †	Unknown

Units involved
Ansar al-Sharia; Sons of Abyan; Hamza al-Zinjibari battalion; Other Islamic militants; Tribal fighters(some after April 2017)	Republic of Yemen Armed Forces: Tribal fighters(Some in the side of AQAP since April 2017); 15th Infantry Brigade(Zinjibar); 111th Armored Brigade (Ahwar District); 115th Infantry Brigade (Shuqrah); 119th Infantry Brigade (Jaʿār); 103rd Infantry Brigade (Jaʿār); 5th Infantry Brigade (Mudiyah District); Special forces; Southern Movement; Al Hizam brigade(Security Belt); Rapid Deployment Force; 1st support brigade; 2nd storm battalion; 6th Hazm Battalion; People's Committees; Popular Resistance	15th Armored Brigade

Strength
1,000-2,000 (Before May 2016); 4,000-12,000 (After May 2016)	Yemen: 4,000-7,000 (Hadi loyalists); Southern Movement: 15,000 (Southern Movement and Al Hizam Brigade fighters)	200-300 soldiers

Casualties and losses
235+ killed 53+ captured dozens wounded dozens surrendered dozens deserted	Yemen: 111+ killed 65+ wounded 6 captured Southern Movement: 133+ killed 134+ wounded	7+ killed dozens wounded
- 21+ civilians killed dozens wounded

The Abyan conflict was a series of clashes between forces of al-Qaeda in the Arabian Peninsula (AQAP) loyal to Yemeni president Abdrabbuh Mansur Hadi, and forces loyal to Southern Movement for the control of Abyan Governorate between 2016 and 2018.

== Background ==
Abyan Governorate was a stronghold for al-Qaeda in the Arabian Peninsula at the beginning of the Yemeni civil war. AQAP was beginning to take pieces of southern Abyan in late 2016, when they captured Zinjibar and other towns. An internal crisis erupted in Abyan between the legitimate AQAP emir, Tawfiq Belaidi (brother of the late AQAP emir Hamza al-Zinjibari) and another AQAP warlord named Abu Anas al-Sanani, over who would succeed Hamza. It is unclear who won the day, but the conflict killed 7 and wounded 9.

== Clashes and other incidents ==
On February 21, AQAP militants withdrew from Ahwar city, after a failed attempt to consolidate control. AQAP militants attacked a popular resistance checkpoint, killing three, before erecting their own checkpoints and flying al-Qaeda's flag from government buildings.

Militiamen from the Bakazim tribe massed outside Ahwar in response. AQAP agreed to withdraw under the terms of a tribal mediation allowing the group free passage through the city.

On March 8, AQAP gunmen abducted government official Haidara Daha at al Musaymir, west of Zinjibar. AQAP was consolidating control in Abyan governorate and targeted local leaders and officials opposed to its expansion.

On March 26–27, three US drone strikes killed eight AQAP members and three beekeepers in Al Mahfad District. Two Saudi planes launched rockets into an old office of the local government in Zinjibar, setting the building on fire. 10 AQAP fighters were believed to be killed.

On April 8, more than 35 Hadi Yemeni government soldiers were captured by AQAP soldiers in Ahwar. 17-20+ of them were executed by firing squad. The others were wounded but still alive, while others were believed to have escaped and reached safety. The soldiers were travelling from Aden to Al Mahrah Governorate via Ahwar, and were ambushed while passing Ahwar.

On April 9, AQAP denied that its fighters executed the soldiers, blaming a local fighter named Ali Aqel. "We entered Ahwar around two months ago to chase this corrupt individual and his gang", the statement said.

On April 14, an airstrike hit an AQAP checkpoint in the Al Kawd, killing 10 AQAP militants. tribal fighters loyal to Hadi ambushed an AQAP convoy in Mafhad, killing 3, including a commander, Amjad al-Wahti.

On April 17, two airstrikes hit Zinjibar, targeting the house of Tariq al-Fadhli. No information about casualties was provided.

== Ground offensive ==
On April 22, Hadi loyalists and their partners prepared to attack Zinjibar in a ground offensive. Southern Movement leader Omar Jardana from Hadramaut escaped an AQAP prison in Zinjibar, traveling to Aden. An airstrike on an AQAP HQ in Zinjibar killed 8 terrorists. Islamic State of Iraq and the Levant (ISIL) commander Radwan Qanan was also killed, during an apparent meeting with al Qaeda there. Two other AQAP commanders, Abu Salem al-Adani and Abu Hamza al-Shabwani, were killed. Four other AQAP fighters were killed.

On April 23, the battle began, but the forces of Hadi loyalists retreated after AQAP militants detonated a car bomb (VBIED) targeting an army convoy that killed 4 loyalists and injured 14 others. Reports indicated that AQAP had planned additional VBIED attacks. The Hadi government gave AQAP a 24-hour window in which to peacefully withdraw. Loyalists carried out another offensive in Jaʿār, that killed 25 AQAP militants and four soldiers and seized al Koud, three miles south of Zinjibar. Hadi loyals, cleared the entrance of Abyan (Aden-Abyan border). They advanced towards the city of Al Koud and expelled al-Qaeda stationed in the prison and on the coastal strip along the international stadium east of Zinjibar. According to officials, army forces were reached at the gates of the city of Zinjibar. The army reached Dofas, but was attacked by AQAP. Two soldiers were killed. AQAP did not agree with the deal that loyalists offered to them, so they remained in Zinjibar.

On April 26, a U.S. airstrike targeted a car carrying al Qaeda militants that was traveling between Ja’ar and Zinjibar. The strike killed 5 AQAP fighters, including local commander Abu Sameh al-Zinjibari.

Al Qaeda militants arrived in Zinjibar on April 27, after fleeing the coalition-led recapture of their stronghold in Mukalla, Hadramawt on April 23. Residents of Zinjibar demonstrated against AQAP on April 29, the first such demonstration since AQAP captured the city in December 2015. The demonstrators called for the liberation of Zinjibar from AQAP, emphasizing they would not allow their city to become a base for militant activity.

== AQAP retreats and comebacks ==
AQAP agreed to begin withdrawing from Zinjibar on May 3. AQAP had previously reinforced positions in western Abyan governorate ahead of a planned government offensive, but later agreed to begin withdrawing its forces after further negotiations. The group reportedly agreed on April 30 to withdraw from Zinjibar on the condition that government forces not enter the city and that local militias not resume their activities. AQAP sought guarantees that its members would remain immune from future prosecution. Local mediators gave the group three days to withdraw before a clearing operation on May 3, but offered an extension to avert a costly battle. Al Qaeda began withdrawing on May 5, evacuating several governmental buildings and retreating towards Shabwah Governorate.

On June 20, AQAP made a brief comeback in western Abyan, when they raided the central prison in Jaar, freeing prisoners and escaping unharmed. Citizens in western Abyan reported that AQAP troops were operating freely in Jaar and Zinjibar at the end of June, less than two months after it had withdrawn.

On June 28, an airstrike targeted the home of AQAP leader Qasim al-Raymi, killing five people, including two family members. Qasim survived the attack some wounds.

On July 20, the government announced an operation to clear Al Qaeda in western Abyan.

On July 22, AQAP soldiers assassinated Colonel Saeed Salim al-Mul in Zinjibar.

On July 24, reported coalition airstrikes targeted AQAP fighters near al Husn city. The airstrikes killed multiple fighters and destroyed vehicles.

On August 7, AQAP militants killed Yemeni Colonel Abdullah Shamba in Abyan.

On August 14, Hadi loyalists, alongside Sudanese troops, and pro-Hadi tribal fighters, invaded Shaqrah, Zinjibar and Jaar, and recaptured them from AQAP, killing some 40 fighters.

On August 15, AQAP detonated a suicide car bomb in Shaqrah, killing four and wounding another four Hadi loyalists.

On August 17, AQAP withdrew from most of Abyan after Hadi government and popular resistance forces drove them out of Lawder city and Ahwar district. The militants withdrew towards al Bayda city in al Bayda governorate, northwest of Lawder city.

On August 18, an AQAP suicide bomber killed at least three government soldiers in Lawder.

On August 22, Saudi airstrikes targeted AQAP fighters in Al Mahfad District, the last AQAP stronghold in Abyan.

On August 23, AQAP's remaining fighters withdrew to Mahfad after tribal forces led by pro-Hadi tribal forces expelled them from Wadea.

On August 26, Hadi-allied forces entered al Mahfad district to clear AQAP militants from the town, resulting in the complete elimination of AQAP from strongholds in Abyan.

== Small attacks and AQAP comeback ==
AQAP returned to Abyan in mid-September 2016, with small attacks against security forces.

On September 14 militants attacked security forces in al ‘Ayn city, Abyan governorate. AQAP militants killed two Hizam security forces after approaching a checkpoint dressed in military uniforms.

On September 15 Al Qaeda mortars targeted security forces in Mudia district. Hizam security forces attempted to clear the mortar site following the attack. Fighting erupted in western and northern Abyan, with many gunfights.

On September 23 one soldier was killed in Zinjibar after an AQAP attack. As of September 26, AQAP had returned to Lawder and Al Wade'a District, fighting Hizam troops, resulting in the death of AQAP commander Abdullah Saeed Habibat and the capture of Abu Osama Al-Yasiri in Al Wadea. Two militants and one Hizam troop were killed in the clashes.

As of October 6, AQAP had made a comeback in al Mafhad district by attacking security forces, killing at least one Hizam soldier.

On October 20 fighting erupted in Zinjibar and Lawder that left 12 Hizam troops and 7 AQAP dead.

On October 27 fighting in Lawdar left three security forces and one AQAP commander dead. Seven AQAP fighters were arrested after clashes in Zinjibar and Lawdar. In mid-November During a 2-hour battle in Lawder and Jaar, AQAP stole heavy machine guns and supplies from Hizam troops.

On November 20 AQAP attacks killed more than three AQAP troops in Lawdar.

On November 27 Hizam arrested two AQAP in Jaar.

On December 20 5 Hizam troops were killed in Lawdar by AQAP attacks.

On December 30, a US drone strike killed AQAP Emir of Lawdar in Al Bayda Governorate, Jalal Al-Seydi, and his bodyguard, Abu Bilal al-Lawdari. After his death, AQAP retook control of Lawder.

In the dawn of January 3, 2017, AQAP fighters ambushed al-Hizam troops in the outskirts of the Shuqrah district, southern Abyan. Three Hizam troops were killed and many injured. After the incident, clashes erupted between Hizam troops who not been strategically positioned. During the conflict many Hizam troops were injured. Hadi loyal soldiers attacked AQAP forces in al-Maraqisha mountains, with more than 40 armored vehicles, but AQAP ambushed them before their attack. The death toll was 15 terrorists and 11 Hadi loyals.

On January 4 AQAP attacked Hizam troops in Lawder and Shuqrah, killing three and wounding two. Two AQAP soldiers were killed.

On January 9 Hizam and security forces troops officially withdrew from northern Abyan, leaving the territory to AQAP warlords, after intense fights in Lawdar and Shuqrah, giving AQAP complete control and strongholds in Abyan, 4 months after it withdrew from Abyan.

On January 11 AQAP attacked an Al Hizam convoy that was leaving Lawdar, wounding Hizam General Amin al-Saqqaf, alongside four of his bodyguards. One Hizam soldier was killed.

On January 13 clashes erupted in eastern Lawder, but with no casualties or injuries in both sides.

On January 18 AQAP ambushed Hizam troops in Zinjibar, killing one Hizam soldier and injuring many others before fleeing the scene.

On January 19 AQAP attacked Hizam fighters in Shuqrah, killing and wounding many. The same day, AQAP deployed its troops in Khanfir District, a southern Abyan city, with a population of 100,000 inhabitants. Hizam withdrew from central and southern Abyan, going to Aden, leaving the province to AQAP. At the time, a meeting in Zinjibar by security commanders of Abyan province. The meeting gathered Mohammed Al-Oban, commander of Zinjibar sector, Mazen Junaidi, commander of Shuqrah and Awhar sectors and Ali Deeb Boumhal Alkazmi, commander of the security forces. The commander vowed to terminate the Hizam forces commander, Abdullah Al-Fadhli, due to his failures against AQAP.

On January 28 AQAP militants ambushed Hizam security forces in central Abyan governorate, killing commander Rushdi al Alwani and three al Hizam troops. AQAP militants claimed to seize al Hizam weapons after the ambush. AQAP also shelled a security headquarters in Zinjibar.

On February 2 AQAP gained control of Lawdar, killing six Hizam troops. One day after, AQAP withdrew from Lawdar because of a tribal uprising that killed 13 of their fighters. Before retreating, AQAP destroyed a government building. AQAP gained full control of Shuqrah and Aked in central Abyan. An AQAP offensive in Ahwar failed and the fighters retreated to western and northern Abyan.

On February 6 AQAP kidnapped and executed colonel Abdullah Khader Hussein in Zinjibar.

On February 7 it was announced that four army battalions were preparing to invade AQAP-held northern and central Abyan. In Lawder and Mudiyah District, local fighters from Al-'Awadhil tribe ambushed and killed 3 AQAP soldiers, among them the Emir of Al-Ain village, Abdullah Al-Zaidi.

On February 9 Hizam forces raided a house in Jaar, capturing two AQAP fighters. AQAP fighters clashed with government fighters in Zinjibar and Jaar. Government officials denied that AQAP was in control of central, southern, northern and eastern Abyan, claiming that tribal forces rebuffed their attacks.

On February 10 AQAP forces clashed with Hizam troops in Al-Marwan village, killing several Hizam troops, and destroying two military vehicles. Tribal fighters of unknown affiliation captured 5 government troops there.

On February 13 tribal fighters ambushed and killed 3 AQAP fighters in central Abyan.

=== Zinjibar attack ===
As of the end of February, AQAP remained in control of about half of Abyan. On February 21 AQAP sized large convoys with weapons from Hadi's government and sent them to Lawdar. On February 24 AQAP fighters killed 8 government soldiers, and wounded another 11 in a suicide bombing in Zinjibar.

== AQAP fighting with US and fighting escalation ==
On March 2, US drone strikes killed 5 AQAP fighters in rural Abyan.

On March 3, US airstrikes killed AQAP's Emir of Aden, Osama Haidar. All of the fighters in the vehicle died. US soldiers were reported to land in the same place, and had a gunfight with al-Qaeda, before retreating via helicopter. The Pentagon denied these reports. US strikes killed Usayd al-Adani, AQAP's Emir in Abyan, who died alongside Mohamed Tahar, a 7-year prisoner in Guantanamo Bay detention camp.

In the middle of the night of March 4, a drone strike killed two AQAP fighters in Al Maraqisa region who were riding a motorbike. An airstrike killed 2 AQAP fighters in Ahwar, and a drone strike targeted Usayd's deputy, Harithah al-Waqari, but failed to kill him.

On March 5 AQAP attacked a checkpoint in Shuqrah and Lawdar. In Lawdar, they killed 5 Hizam troops and one civilian, and in Shuqrah, they killed 6 Hizam troops and captured the checkpoint.

On March 6 AQAP attacked a Hizam checkpoint in `Arqub Umm Kubayr. During the attack, 6 Hizam and 5 AQAP were killed. Hizam troops held the checkpoint.

On March 8 AQAP arrested two of its fighters accusing that they were US spies.

On March 9 AQAP commander Qasim Khalil was killed in a US drone strike in central Abyan.

On March 13 Abu Bakr Hussein Salem replaced the unpopular Khader Al-Saeedi as governor of Abyan after months of angry protests.

On March 20 fighting erupted in Lawdar, between Southern Movement fighters, and Houthi rebels.

On March 23 AQAP fighters ambushed the son of Deputy Interior Minister, Ali Nasser Lakhma, Commander Nasser Ali Nasser, in Lawdar killing him and six of his soldiers. The wife of Nasser Ali and another woman were also wounded.

On March 28 Ahmed Mansour Al-Marqashi resigned as company commander for Zinjibar sector of Al-Hizam brigade. US airstrikes targeted AQAP positions in Al Wade'a District. No reports of casualties emerged. At midnight of March 28, US airstrikes hit AQAP positions in Mudiyah District, Abyan, killing 4 AQAP fighters.

On March 29 warships of unknown origin fired missiles in Mudiyah, causing unknown casualties.

On March 30 the US fired M224 mortars and airstrikes on AQAP positions in Khanfir District and Al Wade'a District. In Al Wade'a, the strikes killed two local AQAP commanders, Waddah Muhammed Amsouda, Abu Obeida Al-Dhamji, and two other AQAP fighters, who was reportedly meeting others in a house.

On April 2 Shuqrah Al-Hizam company commander Mahmoud Shamba survived an assassination attempt by AQAP militants at Zinjibar.

On April 4 General Supervisor of Abyan's Al-Hizam, Ahmed Hamid Al-Marqashi resigned, citing failure of leadership. He stated that the forces of Hadi in Abyan, especially in Zinjibar and Shoqrah were only half that listed (some 1,800 to 3,000 Hadi loyalists).

On April 5 a US drone strike killed Al-Qaeda provincial official Ahmed Ali Saana while he was riding his motorbike in the town of Khabar al Muraqasha in the coast of Abyan.

On April 9 AQAP fighters killed an Al-Hizam member when he was riding in a motorbike in Lawdar, and wounded his aide. The killed officer was Ali Abdul Hakim Daraan, a Hadi loyalist who had killed an AQAP commander in 2012 in Al Bayda Governorate in revenge for his father's death by AQAP. It is believed that AQAP killed Daraan in retaliation for their dead officer. AQAP fighters ambushed colonel Abdul Alim Abdul Jalil of 137th Infantry Brigade in Ahwar as he traveled from Aden to Al Mahrah Governorate. All escaped the ambush unharmed.

On April 11 the former longtime ally of Hadi in Zinibar and Khanfir, Abdul Latif Al-Sayed, resigned from his Hizam post, siting organizational failure to fight expanding AQAP forces in Abyan. Afterwards, he took command of the UAE-loyal backed Rapid Deployment Force in Abyan.

On April 13 AQAP forces killed the Hizam commander in Shuqrah, Ali Saleh Haydara Al-Awd, and wounded his son, in an attack on one of the last-remaining Hizam checkpoints in the area.

== Agreement, Southern Transitional Council, continued fighting ==
Qasim al-Raymi, Al-Qaeda's Emir of Yemen, announced that his group, AQAP, would cease attacking the West in order to maintain its control in territories it already ran. They claimed that this would help them rule without fighting tribal forces, as the agreement was requested by central Yemen tribal forces. AQAP agreed to not attack or provoke the west, so tribesmen could stay out of US drone strikes.

On April 16 US warships shelled AQAP positions in Mudiyah District, with no casualties.

On April 20 southern resistance fighters repelled Houthi fighters trying to infiltrate Abyan through Lawdar.

On May 3 AQAP fighters attacked Rapid Deployment Force fighters in Shuqrah, injuring two soldiers.

On May 7 two AQAP commanders, Al-Abali and Mukhtar Jami, were found dead in the border region between Abyan and Lahij Governorate.

On May 25 a man killed two Hizam soldiers in Ahwar, and then fled. The man later surrendered to authorities.

On May 26 unknown gunmen riding on a motorbike, killed civilian Sami Ahmed Al-Yafei, in Shuqrah.

On June 2 AQAP ambushed a convoy of an Hadi loyalist official, Bassam Al-Mihdhar. Two soldiers were wounded.

On June 5 AQAP killed 2 Al Hizam soldiers in Lawdar, and seized their armed vehicle.

On June 6 an AQAP suicide bomber targeted the convoy of Abyan security chief Abdullah Al-Fadhli in Dufas area, killing 2 of his guards, and wounding himself and his brother, Ali Al-Fadhli.

On June 9 tribals and officials loyal to Hadi announced coordination between government forces and tribes in the city of Lawdar. The move came after a meeting chaired by Brigadier General Nasser and Abed Rabbo Mohammed, commander of the 115th Infantry Brigade in Lawdar, a number of sheikhs, dignitaries and social figures in the city and its environs, to discuss the repercussions of the terrorist attack that targeted Abyan security chief Abdullah Al-Fadhli.

On June 10 Hadi loyalist and Abyan Governor, Abu Bakr Hussein, had a meeting with an AQAP leader in the house of Brig. Faisal Rajab, Tariq Al-Fadhli, a controversial political figure, who was friend with Osama bin Laden, and later, created one of the first branches of Al-Qaeda in Yemen. After that, he joined Ali Abdullah Saleh. and later joined Southern Movement but at the beginnings of 2010, he re-joined AQAP.

On June 13 Ahmad al-Rabizi, a Southern Movement leader, called Hadi loyalist and governor of Abyan, Abu Bakr Hussein to defect to Southern Transitional Council, telling that "Is illogical, all of the other Southern governors to be member of STC, and not the governor of Abyan, letting the later isolated by all other southern provinces." If Abu Bakr accepted or declined is not known.

On June 26 clashes erupted between Houthi forces and southern movement in Thira. One Southern movement fighter wounded, and at least 7 Houthi fighters were killed.

On June 28 1 civilian killed, and 2 other wounded when unknown gunmen attacked them in a Qat marked in Zinjibar.

On June 29 AQAP gunmen captured a Southern Movement commander, named Mokhtar Mohammed Haydan Al-Habashi Al-Audhali, who also is an officer in security force at Mashiq palace in Aden.

On July 2 US drone strikes killed the Chief financial officer of AQAP in Abyan, Ibrahim al-Adani, in Al Wade'a District, alongside one of his aides.

On July 4 it was announced that 3,000 members of the popular committees are to be intergraded in the Hadi loyal Army in Abyan. Mokhtar Mohammed Haydan Al-Habashi Al-Audhali released by AQAP in Lawdar after tribal negotiations.

On July 20 local tribesmen arrested two men belonging to a gang that robbed travelers in Al-Maraqisha.

On July 23 AQAP terrorists ambushed al-Hizam soldiers in Al Wade'a District, killing al-Hizam commander of Wadea, Abdulhakim Omair. Two other soldiers were wounded.

On July 29 AQAP fighters killed Nasser Saleh Al-Jaari 'Jeddo', in Lawdar. Nasser was a leader of Al-Hizam and the popular committees in the region. A senior commander of AQAP in Abyan region, Khaled Abdul Nabi, surrendered to security forces in Lahij Governorate. AQAP claimed that it killed 5 Hizam troops in Shoqrah with rockets on July 31. The claim is not verified.

On August 1 AQAP fighters attacked Hizam troops in Ahwar and Shuqrah, wounding 3, and killing another 5.

== 115th brigade attacks, STC and Hadi loyals fighting ==
On August 7 many AQAP fighters arrived from Shabwah Governorate to northern Abyan amid fighting in Shabwah.

On August 8 AQAP suicide bomber Arif Adel Hassan Habib, killed 12 Hadi loyalists from the 103rd brigade, and wounded another 28. The brigade was deployed in Abyan in early August.

On August 9 Abdul Latif al-Sayed and Munir Abu Al-Yamamah combined forces arrived in Ahwar and secured it with checkpoints, expelling AQAP elements.

On August 13 their combined force withdrew to Shuqrah after not receiving funds from the central government. Suspected AQAP gunmen ambushed 115th Infantry Brigade leader Ahmed Mohammed Al-Shubaili, severely wounding him and killing his son, Al-Khader Ahmed Mohammed Al-Shubaili, in Lawdar. A US drone strike killed 2 AQAP fighters in Maraqisha, including militant Abu Asid al Marqishi.

On August 14 Hadi loyalists security forces raided a hotel in Aden, killing the chief of security of Rasad District, Hussein Ahmed Qomata, and wounding the Al-Hizam commander of Rasad, Abdul Razzaq Al-Jordemi. Forces led by Abu Al-Yamamah arrested Yasser al-Amoudi, citing connection to the raid that killed Qomata.

On August 18 militants blew up the home of president Hadi in his hometown of Marabah village in Al-Wadea district. AQAP urged Abyani people and tribes not to work with UAE and US, or they would face fighting. Gunmen fired on an official of 115th brigade in Lawdar, named Abdullah Abdulsalam al-Qabli, wounding him seriously.

On August 23 suspected AQAP gunmen attacked members of popular committees in the city of Amshara, killing the PC leader of Lawdar Mahdhar Abdul, and wounded two others. In the same place, militants ambushed the deputy governor of Al Bayda Governorate, Sheikh Ahmed Salem Al-Aseeli, wounding him, and killing 3 of his fighters.

On August 24 suspected AQAP fighters attacked al-Hizam checkpoint in Ahwar, without causing any casualties.

On August 28 AQAP fighters ambushed Al-Hizam forces in Khanfar, and during the battle, 2 Hizam fighters were killed and 1 wounded by friendly fire. Abdul Latif Al-Sayed and his forces thwarted AQAP fighters from planting bombs in Jaar, and killed 5 terrorists, while the others escaped.

On August 30 AQAP attacked the 103rd brigade base in Jahayn, but were repelled by the soldiers.

On August 31 AQAP attacked a Hizam base in Al-Wadea, but was again repelled.

On September 7 a civilian was killed in Lawdar by unknown gunmen.

== Al Wadea offensive ==
On September 12 more than 40 armored vehicles of Hizam forces invaded AQAP controlled parts in Al Wade'a District, with support from Saudi Arabian Air Force, and raided AQAP positions. During the fighting, Hizam forces captured an AQAP explosives and weapons barracks.

Later on, Hizam forces raided an AQAP compound in Wadea and captured 15 AQAP fighters, including commander Abu Abdullah Al-Kazemi, bombmaker Ahmed Al-Khader bin Lazraq and Nasser Mohammed Jubah al-Maqni. Three soldiers were wounded.

During operation on September 13, a Saudi colonel pilot was killed after his plane crashed due to technical failures. Afterwards, Hizam forces captured two AQAP compounds that were used to create weapons, killing 6 fighters, and capturing 7 more. The remaining AQAP fighters retreated towards the AQAP bastion in Al Mahfad District.

On September 14 a drone strike killed two AQAP leaders, Harithah al-Waqari and field commander Ali Saleh Al-Buhaith Al-Fathani, in Mudiyah. A day later, the three captured AQAP commanders were mysteriously killed while in custody in a possible execution.

On September 16 Hizam forces advanced further in Wadea and clashed with the Emir of AQAP there, Al-Khader Ali Ahmed Basaree who also served as the Emir of Abyan after Usayd al-Adani. The Hizam captured Wadea, and later found the body of Al-Khader Ali Ahmed Basaree, who died from his wounds in an abandoned building. AQAP terrorists ambushed the deputy commander of Hizam in Abyan, Fahd Hassan Alawi Garmah. Fahd was not injured, but one of his soldiers was killed. AQAP later claimed that two soldiers died.

On September 18 AQAP claimed it killed 4 Hizam soldiers in Al Ayn in an IED attack.

On September 19 Hizam forces raided the houses of the Emirs of Lawdar and Al Hisn, killing the latter, Mohammed Saleh Al-Awsiji and capturing the former, Aqil Matali. Hizam forces arrived in AQAP stronghold Mudiyah, in a prelude to clearing Al-Qaeda terrorists. Abu Bakr Hussein Salem later arrived there, after Hizam secured the town.

On September 23 two AQAP commanders were captured in Mudiyah. The first is the Emir of Mudiyah District, Ali Saleh Dehis and his second in command, Mohammed Nasser Dehis.

On September 26 Al-Hizam forces raided the house of AQAP senior terrorist commander in Abyan, Ahmed Abdul Nabi. Ahmed was the brother of Khaled Abdul Nabi, another AQAP senior commander, who had surrendered some months before. The terrorist refused to surrender after a 10-day negotiation, resulting to his death. His son, Mohamed Abdul Nabi, another son, and another 3 of Nabi's men were arrested by Hizam forces, which sustained 3 injuries. Three of Nabi's men escaped. One of the wounded Hizam fighters was the commander of the operation, Abdullah Ali al-Yazidi.

On September 27 Hizam forces captured two AQAP officials in Al-Ain, Abyan, Haitham al-‘Arr and Abdullah al-Huqairi. Rapid Intervention forces captured an Al-Qaeda terrorist who served as an explosives expert for the organization, al-Khader Ahmad Hussein Al-Darmali. He was responsible for IED attacks and car bombs. An IED explosion injured two Hizam soldiers in Jaar. The attack was claimed by AQAP.

== Further attacks during 2017 ==
On October 2 AQAP claimed responsibility for an ambush east of Mudiyah that killed a soldier and damaged an armored vehicle.

On October 5 an AQAP IED in Mydiyah wounded 7 Hizam soldiers. A day later, an AQAP suicide bomber detonated himself in the convoy of Khanfir district Hizam commander Colonel Abdul Rahman Al-Shuneini in Shuqrah, killing 4 and wounding 7. Al-Shuneini was seriously wounded.

On October 9 50 UAE technicals arrived in Wadea for Hizam forces.

On October 10 Hizam forces in Mudiyah captured AQAP commander, Mohammed Saleh Saeed al-Awlaki. A day later, they raided the house of an AQAP leader, Abdul Hakim Amer. The Hizam troops seized intelligence material, but were unable to capture the terrorist.

On October 18 an IED killed Hizam commander Ayad bin Suhail al-Yafei, and wounded another two in Mudiyah.

On October 19 Hizam forces arrested suspected senior AQAP leader Salem Ali Ahmed Al-Zaidi in Wadea.

On October 20 a suspected US drone strike killed 5 AQAP fighters as they retreated from Abyan heading to Al Bayda. The fighters included AQAP's Emir of Lawdar Nayef Al-Damaji Abu Obaidah, and four other militants.

On October 23 an AQAP attack on Al-Hizam's HQ in Mudiyah killed 5 Hizam troops. 4 AQAP terrorists were killed.

On October 29 Hizam forces deployed to Mahfad district and met with Sabwani Elite forces led by Lt Col Mohammed Salem Al-Buhar Al-Qomaishi, to jointly begin operations in Mahfad. During their entrance, an AQAP suicide bomber detonated, killing one Hizam soldier and wounding another three

On October 30 an IED wounded two Hizam soldiers in Lawdar.

On October 31 Hizam forces raided an AQAP camp in Mahfad, arresting 2 terrorists in a huge blow to AQAP, considered one of the most important Al-Qaeda camps in the country.

On November 1 a US drone strike killed AQAP commander Ahmed Al-Khader Al-Waleedi in Mudiyah. senior AQAP commander Mohammed Awad Mahfar surrendered to the forces of Abdullatif al-Sayed.

On November 7 the 6th Hazm Battalion of Al-Hizam arrived to Mahfad for a long term deployment.

On November 10 a US drone strike killed two AQAP fighters in Lawdar.

On November 11 an IED explosion killed Hizam 1st support brigade commander Mansour Al-Ajili Abu Sharara.

On November 14 Abu Bakr Hussein Salem recommended appointment of Col Khader Al-Nub as Security Chief to replace Abdullah Al-Fadhli.

On November 17 an IED targeted a Hizam convoy, injuring at least one soldier.

On November 29 an IED killed two soldiers and wounded another in Mahfad.

On December 6 Hizam forces captured Abu Salem Al-Walidi, AQAP chief financial officer of Abyan in Mudiyah.

On December 12 Hizam forces killed the AQAP leader who led the ambush that killed Abdelhakim Omair, Saleh al-Barak, during a clash at a checkpoint in Wadea.

On December 16 AQAP commanders Abdu Majda and Hadi Al-Saeeli surrendered to Hizam after clashing with the forces of Saleh Al-Amiri Abu Qahtan in Lawdar.

== AQAP decline of activity ==
On January 7, 2018, a commander of Hizam forces in Wadea was wounded by an IED. The commander was the brother of Hizam commander Abdelhakim Omair, who was killed during an AQAP ambush.

On January 15 AQAP terrorists shelled the camp of 1st Hazm Battalion camp in Mahfad from the Al-Khayala mountains. One soldier was wounded by shrapnel.

On January 18 AQAP targeted the vehicle of Hizam leader Salem Muhaim at the eastern entrance to Al-Mahfad town. Two soldiers were wounded.

On January 28 a US drone strike killed three AQAP fighters in Abyan.

On February 11 two AQAP terrorists were captured in Jaar by Hizam forces, suspected of leading a 15-man AQAP force in a bank attack in Aden in July 2017 that killed the bank's security manager.

On February 16 AQAP fighters detonated an IED in a Hizam vehicle, killing one soldier and wounding three.

== Operation Sweeping Torrent, Hizam infighting, fighting declining ==
On March 8 Hizam forces unleashed Operation Sweeping Torrent to take control of Al Mahfad from AQAP. They began to advance on AQAP positions in the countryside and mountains. During the advance, AQAP emir of Al-Mahfad, Saleh Ahmed Lara, surrendered alongside 8 of his men. His deputy, Nasser Mohsen Basabreen, refused to surrender and was killed in battle.

On March 9 after clearing Mahfad, Hizam forces raided Wadi Hamara, capturing AQAP official Nasser Mubarak al-Muhail, alongside 5 others.

On March 10 forces of AbdulLatif al-Sayed killed the commander of Hizam forces in Mahfad, Salim Muhaim al-Kazemi, along with his deputy, Saddam Ali Touhal, in an apparent power struggle.

On March 11 Hizam forces declared the end of the operation.

On March 18 suspected AQAP gunmen attacked the convoy of Hizam's 2nd storm battalion commander, Manif al-Zubaidi, in Mahfad, killing three soldiers and wounding another. AQAP ambushed two vehicles of Hizam in Mudiyah, while they headed to Aden, killing one soldier and wounding 3.

On March 19 three tribal fighters were injured after clashes broke out east of the Mudiyah, in the village of Qaliatah, between of Al Mansour and Al-Walid.

On March 24 Hizam forces fought each other. Abdulatif al-Sayed's men clashed with those of Saleh al-Amiri Abu Qahtan.

On March, Sayed killed a Mahfad Hizam commander, Salim Muhaim al-Kazemi.

On March 29 AQAP killed a Hizma soldiers in his house in al-Wadea.

On April 7 al-Sayed's forces captured AQAP's deputy for Mansoura district Emir Abi Salem al-Taizi, Hilmi Aqil, in Jaar.

On April 13 AQAP fighters attacked Al-Hizam barracks in Al-Wadea, killing a soldier and wounding others.

On April 18 al-Sayed's forces raided a house in al-Wadea, and during gunfire, killed two AQAP leaders, Hussein Ali Basaree and Murad al-Doubly al-Batani al-Maki .

On April 29 forces of Abdullatif al-Sayed raided Khanfir, targeting and killing AQAP veteran commander Sami Younes Aiash.

== Battle of Maraqisha ==
On May 10 Al-Sayed forces numbering about 500 fighters invaded one of AQAP's last remaining strongholds in Abyan, in Khobar al-Maraqisha. About 30 AQAP fighters were there. During the fighting, several were killed and military vehicles were destroyed. The remaining AQAP forces withdrew from Maraqisha, which was then fully occupied by Hizam forces. Casualties included 6 AQAP fighters dead, and 4 Hizam soldiers killed and 12 wounded.

On May 11 Hizam forces under Abdulrahman Al-Shanini pursued fleeing AQAP medical chief Abu al-Miqdad al-Dhumari, and killed him, alongside 3 of his fighters. Four of his fighters were captured. Hizam casualties were 3 killed and 8 wounded.

== Battle of Ahwar and other incidents ==
On May 12 Hizam forces under Saleh Ahmed bin Nasser al-Kazemi and Commander of the rapid intervention forces Abdullah Ali Rabie al-Kazemi, attacked AQAP forces in Ahwar. Hizam casualties were 4 killed and 3 injured. AQAP casualties were an unspecified number of dead and wounded. Apparently, the clashes did not result in clearing the AQAP fighters from the Ahwar region.

On May 25 suspected AQAP forces planted an IED in the headquarters of Hizam in Lawdar. One Hizam soldier was wounded trying to defuse a bomb, followed by a gunfight between AQAP and Hizam.

On May 26 1 Hizam fighter was killed and four others wounded when their vehicle was struck by a landmine in Al-Mafhad.

On May 30 two suspected AQAP gunmen on a motorbike killed Rapid intervention forces commander, Houd Salih al-Marimi, close to a Qat market in Zinjibar.

On June 14 AQAP fighters attacked Hizam headquarters in Al-Wadea. A car bomb exploded in a checkpoint outside the compound. After the surprise attack, the terrorists opened fire in the HQ compound. Hizam casualties were 3 killed and 8 wounded, including commander Mohammed Abdulla Samqa.

On June 23 Hizam Maraqisha forces under commander Ali al-Misharj, had four wounded soldiers, after an AQAP bomb attack while searching for AQAP remnants. In the same region, a Hizam patrol was attacked by an AQAP IED. Nine soldiers were wounded, including the commander.

On July 2 AQAP terrorists targeted Mafhad Hizam commander, Jamal Mohammed Ahmed Al-kazemi, with five IEDs. The commander survived the attempt, and his forces captured 2 AQAP fighters. One of them was AQAP commander Mohammed Lars.

On August 2 AQAP attacked Hizam HQ in Mahfad, killing and injuring several soldiers. Several AQAP fighters were killed or injured.

On August 3 the fighting had spread to other places in Mahfad. AQAP seriously injured Hizam commander Gamal Lemkah and killed his brother Saud Lemkah. 3 other soldiers were killed, and many others were injured. One AQAP fighter was also killed in the battle. Some sources claimed that Gamal Lemkah had been killed.

On August 4 a civilian was killed by a tribal gunman in Mudiyah.

On August 5 three Hizam soldiers were wounded by a car bomb in Mudiyah.

On August 29 AQAP fighters raided a security checkpoint in Ahwar, killing 5 Hizam soldiers and wounding 7 others, before escaping.

On August 9 a US drone strike killed Ali Shana, also known as Abu Sameh al-Zangbari, in Ahwar, during a gathering of AQAP fighters, alongside 3 other terrorists. Zangbari was a deputy to Abu Hamza al-Zinjibari, the former Emir of Abyan, and a senior commander within Abyani AQAP forces. He had been incorrectly reported killed in 2016.

On August 16 Al-Sayed's forces launched an operation against AQAP commanders in Lauder, Al Ain, Mahfad and Mudiyah. During the operation, Al-Sayed and commander Abdulrahman Al-Shanini raided the homes of fugitive AQAP commanders in Al Ain, Ali Salem Mkeda, and the house of his brother, Mohammed Salem Mkeda. The terrorists escaped but weapons were captured. Hizam then raided the home of another AQAP commander in Lawdar, Nasser Abdullah al-Dabani, who also escaped. During their raid in Lawdar, another AQAP commander, Yasser al-Jahidi, tried to sneak from behind the Hizam forces, but was spotted and killed. In Mudiyah, the Hizam convoy fell into an ambush by AQAP and retreated. Hizam casualties were 2 killed and 3 wounded. East of Mudiyah, in Jinan, Hizam clashed with AQAP, resulting in one dead and one wounded. During the operations, 6 AQAP fighters were captured.

On August 19 Al-Sayed's forces captured an AQAP camp in Mudiyah. The AQAP fighters retreated to Shabwah, Bayda and other regions of Abyan. Hizam forces claimed that some AQAP fighters were killed. Later AQAP claimed that after a three-hour battle that killed 3 Hizam troops, the Hizam withdrew from Mudiyah.
