= Mohamed Tahar =

Yemeni citizen (1980-2017)

Muhammaed Yasir Ahmed Taher
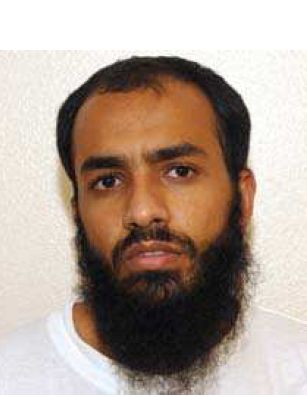
- Born: 1980; Ibb, Yemen
- Died: March 2, 2017 (aged 36–37); Yemen
- Detained at: Guantanamo
- Other names: Mohammed Tahir; Mohammad Ahmad Ali Tahar; Yasir al-Silmi; Yasir Ahmad al Tahar; Muhammed Ahmad Ali Tahir al-Ibbi al-Dini; Farabi; Muhammed Tahir al-Sulami; Muhammed Hammed Allah; Yassir Ali Abdullah Ali Ahmed Al Sulaymi
- ISN: 679
- Charge: No charge (extrajudicial detention)
- Status: Released

Muhammaed Yasir Ahmed Taher (1980 – March 2, 2017) was a citizen of Yemen, who was held in extrajudicial detention in the United States's Guantanamo Bay detention camps, in Cuba. His Guantanamo Internment Serial Number was 679. American intelligence analysts estimate he was born in 1980, in Ibb, Yemen.

He was the younger brother of Ali Abdullah Ahmed, one of the three Guantanamo detainees who died in custody on June 10, 2006. The three deaths were announced by the Department of Defense as suicides.

He was repatriated on December 19, 2009.

NBC News reported, on March 3, 2017, that he was killed by a missile launched from a surveillance drone on March 2, 2017.

== Background ==
Taher was apprehended by a mixed force of Pakistani and American counter-terrorism officials in March 2002. He was captured in an off-campus residence provided for students of Salafi University in Faisalabad, Pakistan together with a dozen other foreign students. He claimed he was just a student at Salafi University, and had no ties to terrorism.

He faced the allegations that his photo was identified as someone who had been seen by an al Qaida member in Afghanistan, and that he had received a recruitment letter from the Taliban.

Historian Andy Worthington, author of The Guantanamo Files, identified Tahar as an individual who informed the officers on his Combatant Status Review Tribunal that he had been informed, early in his detention, that he had been apprehended in error, and would soon be released.

== Official status reviews ==
Originally the Bush Presidency asserted that captives apprehended in the "war on terror" were not covered by the Geneva Conventions, and could be held indefinitely, without charge, and without an open and transparent review of the justifications for their detention. In 2004 the United States Supreme Court ruled, in Rasul v. Bush, that Guantanamo captives were entitled to being informed of the allegations justifying their detention, and were entitled to try to refute them.

=== Office for the Administrative Review of Detained Enemy Combatants ===
Combatant Status Review Tribunals were held in a 3x5 meter trailer where the captive sat with his hands and feet shackled to a bolt in the floor.

Following the Supreme Court's ruling the Department of Defense set up the Office for the Administrative Review of Detained Enemy Combatants.

Scholars at the Brookings Institution, led by Benjamin Wittes, listed the captives still held in Guantanamo in December 2008, according to whether their detention was justified by certain common allegations:

- Mohmmad Ahmad Ali Tahar was listed as one of the captives who "The military alleges ... are associated with both Al Qaeda and the Taliban."
- Mohmmad Ahmad Ali Tahar was listed as one of the captives who "The military alleges that the following detainees stayed in Al Qaeda, Taliban or other guest- or safehouses."
- Mohmmad Ahmad Ali Tahar was listed as one of the captives who "The military alleges that the following detainees were captured under circumstances that strongly suggest belligerency."
- Mohmmad Ahmad Ali Tahar was listed as one of the captives who was an "al Qaeda operative".
- Mohmmad Ahmad Ali Tahar was listed as one of the "34 [captives] admit to some lesser measure of affiliation—like staying in Taliban or Al Qaeda guesthouses or spending time at one of their training camps."
- Mohmmad Ahmad Ali Tahar was listed as one of the captives who had "stayed at Taliban or Al Qaeda guesthouses."
- Mohmmad Ahmad Ali Tahar was listed as one of the captives who had admitted "some form of associational conduct."

Tahar chose to participate in his Combatant Status Review Tribunal. In response to a court order the Department of Defense was forced to comply with a Freedom of Information Act request and publish a sixteen page summarized transcript from Tahar's Tribunal.

Tahar chose to participate in his Administrative Review Board hearing. In response to a court order the Department of Defense responded to a Freedom of Information Act request and published a twelve page summarized transcript from his first annual Review Board in the spring of 2006.

On January 9, 2009, the Department of Defense released two heavily redacted memos, from his 2007 Administrative Review Board, to Gordon England, the Designated Civilian Official.

=== Habeas petition ===
A petition of habeas corpus was filed on his behalf. Over two hundred captives had habeas corpus petitions filed on their behalf before the Detainee Treatment Act of 2005 and the Military Commissions Act of 2006 closed off the captives' access to the US civilian justice system. On June 12, 2008, in its ruling on the Boumediene v. Bush habeas corpus petition, the United States Supreme Court over-rode the Congress and Presidency, and restored the captives' access to habeas corpus.

On July 18, 2008, Pardiss Kebriaei filed a "Petitioner's status report" on Mohammed Ahmed Taher's behalf in Civil Action No. 06-cv-1684.

Mohammad Ahmad Taher had a DTA appeal filed on his behalf. The United States Congress passed the Detainee Treatment Act of 2005 and the Military Commissions Act of 2006. Both these Acts included provisions to close of Guantanamo captives' ability to file habeas corpus petitions.

The Detainee Treatment Act included a provision to proscribe Guantanamo captives who had not already initiated a habeas corpus petition from initiating new habeas corpus petitions. The Act included provision for an alternate, more limited form of appeal for captives. Captives were allowed to submit limited appeals to panels of three judges in a Washington DC appeals court. The appeals were limited—they could not be based on general principles of human rights. They could only be based on arguments that their Combatant Status Review Tribunal had not followed the rules laid out for the operation of Combatant Status Review Tribunals.

Nine months later Congress passed the Military Commissions Act. This Act contained provision to close off all the remaining outstanding habeas corpus petitions. After the closure of the habeas corpus petitions some Guantanamo captives had appeals in the Washington DC court submitted on their behalf, as described in the Detainee Treatment Act.

The DTA appeals progressed very slowly. Initially the Department of Justice argued that the captive's lawyers, and the judges on the panel, needed consider no more evidence than the "Summary of Evidence memos" prepared for the captives' CSR Tribunals. By September 2007, the Washington DC court ruled that the evidence that formed the basis of the summaries had to be made available.

The Administration then argued that it was not possible to present the evidence the Tribunals considered in 2004—because the evidence had not been preserved.

Only one captive, a Uyghur captive named Hufaiza Parhat, had his DTA appeal run to completion. On June 20, 2008, his three judge panel concluded that his Tribunal had erred and that he never should have been confirmed as an enemy combatant.

=== Formerly secret Joint Task Force Guantanamo assessment ===
On April 25, 2011, whistleblower organization WikiLeaks published formerly secret assessments drafted by Joint Task Force Guantanamo analysts. His Joint Task Force Guantanamo assessment was drafted on March 20, 2008. It was signed by camp commandant Rear Admiral Mark H. Buzby. He recommended continued detention.

Charlie Savage noted that Tahar's assessment said Guantanamo authorities had intercepted a letter he wrote to his family depicting his brother as a martyr.

Following reports of his killing Associated Press reporter Lolita C. Baldor quoted extensively from the assessment's description as to why Tahar would represent a risk, if released.

== Press reports ==
Canadian journalist, and former special assistant to US President George W. Bush, David Frum, published an article based on his own reading of the transcripts from the Combatant Status Review Tribunals, on November 11, 2006. It was Frum who coined the term "Axis of evil" for use in a speech he wrote for Bush. Tahar's transcript was one of the nine Frum briefly summarized. His comment on Tahar was:

Another detainee, a Yemeni, explained that he had come to Pakistan to study medicine at a university. Unfortunately, the particular university he had selected lacked any medical faculty. He ended up instead studying Koran in a student guesthouse – and when one of his housemates suggested they take a sightseeing tour of Afghanistan, he agreed to go along. The housemate's name? He had forgotten it.

Frum came to the conclusion that all nine of the men whose transcript he summarized had obviously lied. He did not, however, state how he came to the conclusion they lied. His article concluded with the comment:

But what's the excuse of those in the West who succumb so easily to the deceptions of terrorists who cannot invent even half-way plausible lies?

== Repatriation ==
Carol Rosenberg, writing in the Miami Herald reported that Muhammaed Yasir Ahmed Taher [sic] was one of twelve men transferred from Guantanamo on December 19, 2009. The other eleven men were: Ayman Batarfi, Jamal Alawi Mari, Farouq Ali Ahmed, Fayad Yahya Ahmed al Rami, Riyad Atiq Ali Abdu al Haf, Abdul Hafiz, Sharifullah, Mohamed Rahim, Mohammed Hashim, Ismael Arale and Mohamed Suleiman Barre. Abdul Hafiz, Sharifullah, Mohamed Rahim and Mohammed Hashim were Afghans. Asmael Arale and Mohamed Suleiman Barre were Somalis. The other five men were fellow Yemenis.

== Death ==
He was killed by a missile launched from a surveillance drone on March 2, 2017. Lucas Tomlinson, of Fox News, counted his death twice, being confused by reports that listed him as both Mohammed Tahar and Yasir al Silmi.

This missile's primary target was an individual named either "Usayd al-Adani", or "Mossad al-Adani", or "Sa'ad Atef", reported to be an experienced bomb-maker, and AQAP's emir of either Abyan Province, Shabwah Province, or all of Yemen.
