= Ayman Saeed Abdullah Batarfi =

Guantanamo detainee

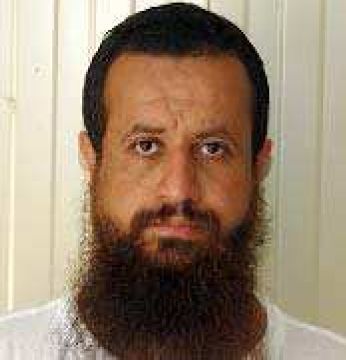
- Ayman Batarfi's Guantanamo ID photo
- Detained at: Guantanamo
- ISN: 627
- Charge: No charge (extrajudicial detention)
- Status: Released

Ayman Saeed Abdullah Batarfi is a Yemeni doctor who was held in extrajudicial detention in the United States Guantanamo Bay detention camps, in Cuba. His Guantanamo Internment Serial Number was 627.

He is an orthopedic surgeon who graduated from medical school in Pakistan and pursued postdoctoral studies there.

On 30 March 2009, the Justice Department announced that the administration had decided to release Batarfi.

Batarfi was the second captive to be cleared for release by the Obama administration's review of captives' status.

== Press reports ==
He claimed that he was forced to work as a doctor at the 2001 Battle of Tora Bora, during which time he treated injured mujahideen fighters inside the region's complex caves. At one of his Administrative Review Board hearings, he confirmed that Osama bin Laden was present during the battle, claiming that he had met with him for ten minutes.

On 25 May 2008, the Yemen Times reported that a number of the Yemeni captives in Guantanamo had gone certifiably insane under the conditions there. The article quoted the recently released Sudanese journalists Sami Al Hajj, who reported that Yemeni captives had been driven insane through the administration of hallucinogenic drugs.

In his book The longest war, Peter Bergen quoted Batarfi, "He did not prepare himself for Tora Bora and to be frank he didn't care about anyone but himself."

=== Summary of Evidence memo ===
A Summary of Evidence memo was prepared for Ayman Saeed Abdullah Batarfi's Combatant Status Review Tribunal, on 2 November 2004. The memo listed the following allegations against him:

a. The detainee is a member of al Qaida and supported the Taliban and al Qaida against the United States and its coalition partners:
1. The detainee entered Afghanistan and went to Jalalabad, until the Northern Alliance approached, at which time he fled to the Tora Bora Mountains and hid with other Arabs trying to flee Afghanistan.
2. The detainee is a former al Wafa official.
3. Al Wafa, a non-governmental organization, officially named al Wafa al Igathat al Islamia (Wafa Humanitarian Organization) and headquartered in Saudi Arabia, has connections to Usama Bin Ladin and Afghan Mujahidin.
4. The detainee purchased medical supplies for al Wafa and sent them to Afghanistan.
5. On approximately 30 November 2001, the detainee personally met with Usama Bin Laden (UBL) in Tora Bora.
6. In July 2001, the detainee stayed in a Quetta Taliban guesthouse.
7. The detainee associated with a senior al Qaida operative and facilitator.
8. The detainee stated that he met with Usama Bin Laden on a number of occasions.
9. The detainee advised that he was involved in the purchase of three (3) vehicles in Herat for the Taliban and he purchased medical equipment for the Taliban.

b. The detainee participated in military operations against the United States and its coalition partners:
1. The detainee arrived in the Tora Bora Mountains in mid-November 2001.
2. The detainee carried a gun while he was in the Tora Bora Mountains.
3. The detainee carried a walkie-talkie during his time in the Tora Bora Mountains in November 2001.

== Batarfi v. Bush ==
A writ of habeas corpus, Ayman Saeed Abdullah Batarfi v. George W. Bush, was submitted on Ayman Saeed Abdullah Batarfi's behalf before US District Court Judge Emmet G. Sullivan. In response, on 4 August 2005, the Department of Defense released seventeen pages of unclassified documents related to his Combatant Status Review Tribunal. He is being represented by Baltimore lawfirm Murphy & Shaffer.

On 12 November 2004, Tribunal panel 15 confirmed his "enemy combatant" status.

According to the decision memo in his dossier:

The detainee refused to leave his cell to meet with the Personal Representative (PR). There was no reason to believe that the detainee was mentally or physically unable to meet with the PR. The PR consulted with the Assistant CSRT Legal Advisor who adsised the PR to request the detainee's guards to inform the detainee of the purpose of the meeting and offer him a second opportunity to leave his cell and meet with the PR. The guards stated the detainee still refused. As noted in detainee records, he spoke and understood English so there was no question that he understood the guards. The CSRT notification letter provided to the detainee in July 2004 required that the detainee be provided a written unclassified summary of the evidence. However, in this case, this was not possible because the detainee's assigned facility did not permit the detainee to receive either written or verbal material while he is in his cell. Since the detainee voluntarily declined to leave his cell in order to meet with the PR to receive this information, after being informed of the purpose of the PR's visit, the detainee elected to not received the unclassified summary of evidence.

On 6 January 2009, Sullivan admonished the Bush administration for improperly withholding exculpatory evidence. He said that the Department of Justice had withheld as many as ten documents from him. Sullivan stated that, now that the documents had been made available to him, he would need at least until a hearing scheduled for 9 March to decide whether Batarfi should be released.

In early April 2009, Sullivan admonished the Justice Department for withholding that one of the witnesses against Batarfi was seriously mentally ill. The Kansas City Star newspaper reported that a transcript of the hearing recorded Sullivan saying:

To hide relevant and exculpatory evidence from counsel and from the court under any circumstances, particularly here where there is no other means to discover this information and where the stakes are so very high ... is fundamentally unjust, outrageous and will not be tolerated. How can this court have any confidence whatsoever in the United States government to comply with its obligations and to be truthful to the court?

The Kansas City Star reported that the unredacted portions of the transcript suggested the unnamed witness suffered from "anti-social personality disorder"—which would have prevented him from understanding the difference between right and wrong, and would make him likely to lie. Bill Murphy, one of Batarfi's lawyers, said:

Given the nature of the medical records about this particular detainee it is difficult to conceive how the government might offer him as a credible witness.

=== Administrative Review Board ===
Detainees whose Combatant Status Review Tribunal labeled them "enemy combatants" were scheduled for annual Administrative Review Board hearings. These hearings were designed to assess the threat a detainee might pose if released or transferred, and whether there were other factors that warranted his continued detention.

=== First annual Administrative Review Board ===
A Summary of Evidence memo was prepared for Ayman Saeed Abdullah Batarfi's first annual Administrative Review Board, on 31 October 2005. The four page memo listed thirty-nine "primary factors favor[ing] continued detention" and two "primary factors favor[ing] release or transfer".

==== Transcript ====
In the Spring of 2006, in response to a court order from Jed Rakoff the Department of Defense published a twenty page summarized transcript from his Administrative Review Board. Attached to the transcript were three letters from family members.

=== Second annual Administrative Review Board ===
A Summary of Evidence memo was prepared for Ayman Batarfi's second annual Administrative Review Board, on 28 November 2006. The four page memo listed thirty-six "primary factors favor[ing] continued detention" and two "primary factors favor[ing] release or transfer".

==== Transcript ====
In September 2007, the Department of Defense released the transcripts from the 2006 Board hearings which captives attended.

== Repatriation ==
On 30 March 2009, it was widely reported that Batarfi was the second captive to be cleared through the new review procedures put in place by United States President Barack Obama. The BBC quoted Dean Boyd, a US justice department spokesman, who indicated Batarfi would be transferred to a third country. Boyd indicated that Batarfi would be transferred: "to an appropriate destination country... in a manner that is consistent with the national security and foreign policy interests of the United States and the interests of justice."

Carol Rosenberg, writing in the Miami Herald, reported that US District Court Judge Emmet G. Sullivan had scheduled Batarfi's habeas corpus hearing for early April.

William Glaberson, writing in The New York Times, reported that, according to Justice department filings, Batarfi might face prosecution in the third country he was transferred to.

The Justice Department did not say whether Dr. Batarfi, 38, who once practiced medicine in Afghanistan, would be freed, monitored or prosecuted if another country agreed to accept him.

Glaberson reported that although Batarfi had agreed to a stay of his habeas petition, to give US diplomats a chance to find a third country to accept him, he reserved the right to re-open the case if he objected to the conditions of his transfer.

Carol Rosenberg, writing in the Miami Herald reported that Ayman Batarfi was one of twelve men transferred from Guantanamo on 19 December 2009. According to Rosenberg Justice Department officials said that Batarfi release had been approved in March 2009. She reported that he was one of the Guantanamo captives who had described himself as a humanitarian aid worker.

The other eleven men were: Jamal Alawi Mari, Farouq Ali Ahmed, Muhammad Yasir Ahmed Taher, Fayad Yahya Ahmed al Rami, Riyad Atiq Ali Abdu al Haf, Abdul Hafiz, Sharifullah, Mohamed Rahim, Mohammed Hashim, Ismael Arale and Mohamed Suleiman Barre. Abdul Hafiz, Sharifullah, Mohamed Rahim and Mohammed Hashim were Afghans. Asmael Arale and Mohamed Suleiman Barre were Somalis. The other five men were fellow Yemenis.

On 5 January 2010, Jay Solomon, writing in The Wall Street Journal reported that Batarfi, and the five other Yemeni men repatriated with him, faced indefinite detention in Yemen. Solomon reported that the indefinite detention was part of the secret agreement negotiated between American and Yemeni officials, prior to the Americans agreeing to repatriate the men.

== 2008 and 2009 assessments of risks posed by Batarfi ==
In testimony before Congress, on 13 January 2010, White House official John Brennan was asked to justify the release of Batarfi, in light of the allegations he was associated with an al Qaeda Weapons of Mass Destruction plan. A follow-up letter, from Brennan, to Nancy Pelosi, was made public in 2011.

On 25 April 2011, the whistleblower organization WikiLeaks published formerly secret documents signed by the Guantanamo camp commandants. Batarfi's document was 15 pages long, signed by Admiral Mark H Buzby, and dated April 29, 2008.

During his appearance before Congress, Congressional Representative Frank Wolf, asked Brennan to explain why Batarfi had been cleared for release, when earlier military status reviews concluded there was reason to believe he had met Osama bin Laden, and that there was reason to believe he had played a role in an al Qaeda Weapons of Mass Destruction plan. In his written reply Brennan stated that the joint task force the Obama administration had put in place had conducted their own more recent review, and concluded the suspicions held against Batarfi weren't substantial enough to justify his detention.

In commentary on Brennan's justification in The Weekly Standard third-party counter-terrorism analyst Thomas Joscelyn challenged Brennan's defense of the Obama appointed 2009 review, by citing the allegations in the 2008 Joint Task Force Guantanamo assessment. Joscelyn quoted several passages from the 2008 military assessment that asserted Batarfi had helped provide Yazid Sufaat with medical laboratory equipment that was intended to be used to develop an anthrax weapon.

Joscelyn quoted another passage from the documents, about Batarfi's ties to Amer Aziz, a mentor Batarfi worked under, during his internship. Aziz had a long history of making trips to Afghanistan to treat wounded mujahideen, dating back to the Soviet occupation of Afghanistan, when the CIA supported them in their battle against the Soviet Union. On 21 October 2002, Aziz was seized by American security officials, who held him, and interrogated him for a month. Following his release Aziz acknowledged his travels to Afghanistan to provide medical care, and acknowledged that those he treated had included senior members of al-Qaeda, including Osama bin Laden. He acknowledged he had treated bin Laden in 1999 and in November 2001. However, Aziz asserted he had no knowledge of any terrorist plans, and that he had not known he would be called upon to treat bin Laden when he travelled to Afghanistan.

Joscelyn quoted the Guantanamo assessment, which said that during his interrogation, Aziz indicated he thought Batarfi was "quite keen" on fighting and "fully believed in al-Qaida."
