= Naab (disambiguation) =

Naab is a river in Germany.

Naab or NAAB may also refer to:

- The National Architectural Accrediting Board of the United States
- NAAB (gene)
- Na`ab, village in Yemen
- Mount Naab, mountain in Antarctica
- Ingbert Naab (1885–1935), monk and resistance fighter in Dahn, Germany
