= Batarfi =

Batarfi is a surname. Notable people with the surname include:

- Ayman Saeed Abdullah Batarfi, Yemeni doctor
- Khalid Batarfi (died 2024), Saudi militant
