= Fall of Zinjibar and Jaar (2015) =

2015 action in the Yemeni civil war

Fall of Zinjibar and Jaʽār
- Part of the Yemeni Civil War (2014–present)
Date	2–3 December 2015 (1 day)
Location	Zinjibar and Jaʿār, Abyan Governorate, Yemen
Result	AQAP victory: Al-Qaeda declares the "Emirate of Jaʽār" and the "Emirate of Zinjibar"

Belligerents
Al-Qaeda: Al-Qaeda in the Arabian Peninsula	(Yemen) Popular Committees; Popular resistance Southern Movement

Commanders and leaders
Abu Hamza al-Zinjibari †	(Yemen) Ali al-Sayed † (Yemen) Al-Khader Haidan; Abdullatif Al-Sayed

Units involved
AQAP: Islamic Emirate of Yemen	Unknown

Strength
Unknown	Unknown

Casualties and losses
5+ killed	22+ killed

In early December 2015, two Yemeni towns, Zinjibar (the provincial capital of Abyan Governorate) and Jaʽār (a town a few km inland to the north), were captured by the jihadist group Al-Qaeda in the Arabian Peninsula (AQAP). This was the second capture and occupation of Zinjibar during unrest in Yemen. The town was earlier taken by AQAP's in May 2011 and held until the summer of 2012.

Zinjibar is close to the port of Aden, and the strait of Bab-el-Mandeb, and between Aden and (what was) the AQAP's stronghold of Mukalla. The al Qaeda takeover of two towns has been seen by some as a demonstration of its interest in seizing territory and not just "conducting spectacular attacks against Western targets".

Zinjibar was retaken by pro-government forces on 14 August 2016.

== Background ==
Zinjibar lies on the Gulf of Aden, about 54 km from Yemen's second city Aden, east of the "strategic" strait of Bab Al-Mandab (about three million barrels of oil pass through the strait daily). Control of Jaʽār would also have made it easier for AQAP to bring supplies from its (former) stronghold of Mukalla, in Hadramawt province, to attack Aden.

=== 2011-2012 fighting ===
Zinjibar was under AQAP's control from May 2011 until the summer of 2012, when they were driven out with the help of American airstrikes. In 2011, the "Yemeni Revolution" protest movement to end the 33 years of rule by President Ali Abdullah Saleh created a "power vacuum" in parts of Yemen. Al-Qaeda in the Arabian Peninsula (AQAP) fighters seized a number of towns in Abyan—including the city of Jaʽār in March 2011 and Zinjibar in May. They later captured a football stadium outside Zinjibar which they used as "a makeshift army base".

The "emirate" created by ASAP was noted as time when Al Qaeda sought to emphasize (and publicize in a media campaign) not strict sharia law, but "uncharacteristically gentle" good governance over conquered territory—rebuilding infrastructure, quashing banditry, and resolving legal disputes. However, "clemency drained away under the pressure of war". After months of fighting, by mid-2011 Al-Jazeera reported that "dozens have been killed and an estimated 54,000 civilians have fled Abyan," and that tribesman formerly allied with AQAP had switched sides and begun backed Yemeni forces in their quest take back Zinjibar from AQAP. According to The New York Times correspondent Robert Worth, the failure of this gentle style of jihadi rule may have "taught" jihadis a lesson later demonstrated by ISIS, that fear and terror were needed to instill obedience and prevent neutral citizens under their rule from eventually becoming enemies.

=== Houthi control ===
Houthi rebels later took control of Zinjibar, but in August 2015 fighters loyal to President Hadi, with the help of Saudi airstrikes, pushed the Houthi out of Zinjibar.

== Battle ==
In 2 December, AQAP attacked Jaʽār and Zinjibar and launched a raid that killed 15 pro-government troops. The deputy leader of the popular committees Ali Al-Sayed was killed. AQAP appeared to first withdraw from the raid but they returned later and consolidated control over the two cities. A local pro government commander and at least 6 other fighters were reportedly killed in the battle fighting AQAP, along with at least five AQAP fighters.

== Aftermath ==
By early October 2015, AQAP fighters had reportedly captured some government buildings in Zinjibar, expelling government fighters and establishing Sharia courts. Using these strongholds Al-Qaeda's fighters stormed Jaʽār and the rest of Zinjibar during the dawn of 1 December 2015. The towns were captured immediately with relatively little fighting, despite local reinforcements from commanders and troops loyal to Yemen's government.

The Yemeni government's preoccupation with fighting Houthi rebels prevented it from sending reinforcements from Aden to assist the Abyan fighters loyal to the government.

=== Declaration of AQAP Emirates ===
After the complete fall of the two cities, Al-Qaeda declared "Emirates" in the two towns providing civilian services, and establishing a Sharia court. The AQAP offensive was led by Abu Hamza Al-Zinjibari, who was "emir" of the Abyan Governorate territory held by AQAP since the 2011 declaration of their Emirate. It is reported that AQAP plowed up the house of the local commander loyal to president Abdrabbuh Mansur Hadi.

=== US drone strikes ===
Some months later, in 27 of March, 2016, three suspected US drone strikes hit AQAP positions inside their government buildings onside Zinjibar, reportedly killing some 14 AQAP soldiers. Three days after the take over, AQAP issued a bounty of 7 million Yemeni riyals ($32,500) on the head of the pro-government Popular Committee, Abdullatif Al-Sayed, alleging he had "stabbed the mujahedeen in the back".

== Recapture of Zinjibar ==
On 14 August 2016, Yemeni government forces backed by Arab coalition aircraft and gunboats reportedly retook Zinjibar from AQAP. The push to retake the town had encountered "repeated suicide attacks" against Yemeni forces.
