= Abdullahi Sudi Arale =

Citizen of Somalia (born 1964)

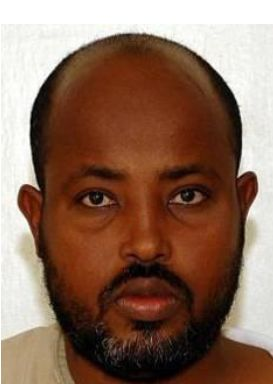
- Guantanamo portrait, via WikiLeaks
- Born: 1964 (age 61–62); Mogadishu, Somalia
- Arrested: 2007; Djibouti
- Released: 2009-12-19
- Citizenship: Somalia
- Detained at: Guantanamo
- Other names: Mohamed Ali Omar; Abdullahi Sudi; Ismael Arale; Ismail Mohammed Mahmoud
- ISN: 10027
- Alleged to be a member of: Somali Council of Islamic Courts al-Qaeda
- Charge: No charge (held in extrajudicial detention)
- Status: Released
- Occupation: Airline ticket agent

Abdullahi Sudi Arale (Somali: Cabdillaahi Suudi Caraale; born 1964) is a citizen of Somalia who was held for two and a half years in extrajudicial detention by the United States. Arale's transfer to the United States Guantanamo Bay detention camps, in Cuba, was confirmed on Wednesday, June 6, 2007.

Arale's capture was said to have occurred "in recent weeks". Arale was alleged to have helped courier weapons and explosives between al Qaeda elements in Pakistan and the horn of Africa. A Department of Defense spokesman said, "We believe him to be an extremely dangerous member of the al-Qaida network,"

Xinhua reports that American officials claimed Arale had held a leadership position in the Somali Council of Islamic Courts. Xinhua also reported American officials claimed Arale had been living in Pakistan until a return to Somalia, "eight months ago".

On November 3, 2008, The New York Times published a page summarizing the official documents from each captive. The New York Times stated that no further official records of his detention—no Combatant Status Review Tribunal had been published.

== Habeas corpus petition ==
Arale has had a writ of habeas corpus filed on his behalf. Carol Rosenberg attached a set of heavily redacted habeas related documents to an article she published in the Miami Herald about Arale when he was repatriated. A heavily redacted Narrative for Ismael Arale stated that he said he traveled to Syria in 1999 to study, failed to get a place. He then traveled to Pakistan in 2000, where he studied at an Islamic University in Islamabad, from 2000 to 2006, while working part-time as an airline ticket agent.

== Repatriation ==
Abdullahi has two half-sisters, who were able to become refugees in Finland, in 1999, when they were children. His half-sisters worked to try to get Finland to offer him asylum, fearing he would be killed if he were repatriated to Somalia. In a profile in the Helsingin Sanomat his half-sisters said he had a wife and four children in Somalia. Two other siblings helped support his family in Somalia. The Helsingin Sanomat published a picture of his sister Amina Muumin holding a picture of Abdullah.

Carol Rosenberg, writing in the Miami Herald reported that Ismael Arale [sic] was one of twelve men transferred from Guantanamo on December 19, 2009.

The other eleven men were: Ayman Batarfi, Jamal Alawi Mari, Farouq Ali Ahmed, Muhammaed Yasir Ahmed Taher, Fayad Yahya Ahmed al Rami, Riyad Atiq Ali Abdu al Haf, Abdul Hafiz, Sharifullah, Mohamed Rahim, Mohammed Hashim and Mohamed Suleiman Barre. Abdul Hafiz, Sharifullah, Mohamed Rahim and Mohammed Hashim were Afghans. Mohamed Suleiman Barre was the other Somali. The other six men were Yemenis.

== Joint Task Force Guantanamo Detainee Assessment ==
On April 25, 2011, Guantanamo Detainee Assessment Briefs, signed by the commandants of Joint Task Force Guantanamo, released to the whistleblower organization WikiLeaks, were published by a selection of cooperating newspapers. Unlike most briefs, Abdullahi's seven page memo was unsigned.
