= Abdullatif Al-Sayed =

Southern Yemeni warlord from Abyan (1972–2023)

- Born: 1972; Khanfir District, South Yemen
- Died: 10 August 2023 (aged 50–51)
- Allegiance: Independent (2000s–2011); AQAP (2011) (Yemen) President Hadi (2011–2015); Southern Movement (2011–2023)
- Service years: 2000s–2023
- Rank: Brigadier General
- Commands: Popular Committees (2011–20??); Security Belt Force in Zinjibar and Khanfar (2016–2017); Rapid Deployment Force (2017–2023)
- Conflicts: Yemeni Civil War: Battle of Zinjibar; 2012 Abyan offensive; Fall of Zinjibar and Jaar; Abyan conflict

Abdullatif Al-Sayed Bafaqih (1972 – 10 August 2023) was a Southern Yemeni warlord from Abyan who played a major role during the wars against Al-Qaeda after 2012 in Abyan Governorate.

Previously, he joined AQAP for a short period of time in 2011 before defecting from the group the same year and joining the forces of Yemen's internationally recognized President Abdrabbuh Mansur Hadi. Al-Sayed was part of the Southern Movement secessionist movement.

== War against Al Qaeda ==
When Al-Qaeda came to Zinjibar in early 2011, Sayed joined AQAP, as he was close to an AQAP commander in Abyan, named Abu Ali al-Hadrami. During the Battle of Zinjibar, he defected from AQAP, and his militia joined president Hadi's forces. He came in direct confrontation with al-Hadrami, as he was surrounded in his home village by Al-Hadrami's forces. Later, when the government launched the 2012 Abyan offensive, he battled his former commander, Abu Hamza al-Zinjibari, AQAP's Emir of Abyan, after a planned meeting gone wrong. During that period, he formed the Popular Committees, numbering about 7,000 fighters, which was backed by Hadi. At that point, he was the de facto ruler of Abyan, as all the Hadi loyal police and soldiers in the province, were under his command.

== After 2012 war with AQAP ==
After the 2012 war, Sayed survived multiple assassination attempts by AQAP, losing more than 50 family members to the group, and one eye and partially a hand during these attempts. At some point after 2012, he was ranked a Brigadier General. In 2015, he was ousted by AQAP during the Fall of Zinjibar and Jaar, and fled to Aden. AQAP put an arrest warrant for him offering seven million Yemeni rials on his head. During the Abyan conflict, his forces were largely ingrained to the Al-Hizam, a force backed by United Arab Emirates and the Southern Transitional Council. In April 2017, he resigned from his post as commander of Zinjibar and Khanfar, and took command of the Hizam's Rapid Deployment Force.

Abdullatif Al-Sayed was killed in a mine explosion on 10 August 2023.
