= Rashnah =

Rashnah is a village in the Mudiyah District in Abyan Governorate, Yemen. According to the 2004 census, the village had a population of 55.
