= 5-nitrosalicylate dioxygenase =

Enzyme

Identifiers
- EC no.: 1.13.11.64

Databases
- IntEnz: IntEnz view
- BRENDA: BRENDA entry
- ExPASy: NiceZyme view
- KEGG: KEGG entry
- MetaCyc: metabolic pathway
- PRIAM: profile
- PDB structures: RCSB PDB PDBe PDBsum
Search
- PMC: articles
- PubMed: articles
- NCBI: proteins

5-nitrosalicylate dioxygenase (EC 1.13.11.64, naaB (gene)) is an enzyme with systematic name 5-nitrosalicylate:oxygen 1,2-oxidoreductase (decyclizing). This enzyme catalyses the following overall chemical reaction

5-nitrosalicylic acid
O_{2}
HNO_{2}
2-oxo-3-(5-oxofuran-2-ylidene)propanoic acid

The two steps are:

(1a) 5-nitrosalicylic acid + O_{2} $\rightleftharpoons$ 4-nitro-6-oxohepta-2,4-dienedioate
(1b) 4-nitro-6-oxohepta-2,4-dienedioate $\rightleftharpoons$ 2-oxo-3-(5-oxofuran-2-ylidene)propanoic acid + nitrite (spontaneous reaction)

The enzyme from soil bacterium Bradyrhizobium sp. JS329 participates in 5-nitroanthranilate degradation.
