= Al Mahfad district =

Coordinates: 14°00′N 46°50′E

Al Mahfad District مديرية المحفد
- District
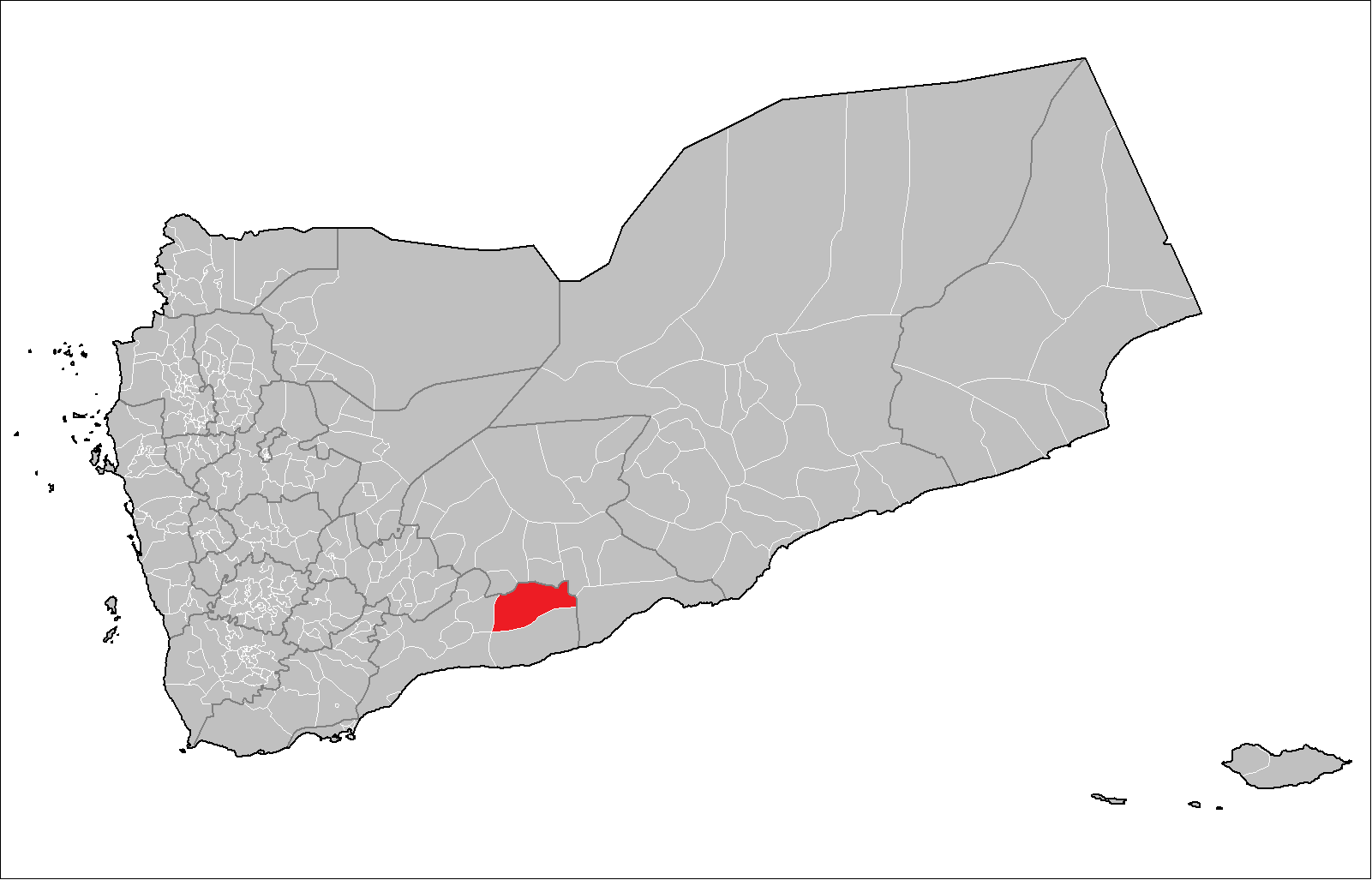
- Country: Yemen
- Governorate: Abyan

Population (2003)
  - Total: 26,870
- Time zone: UTC+3 (Yemen Standard Time)

Al Mahfad District is a district of the Abyan Governorate, Yemen. As of 2003, the district had a population of 26,870 inhabitants.
