= Mohammed Sulaymon Barre =

Somali refugee

Mohamed Saleban Barre
- Born: December 27, 1964 (age 61); Burao, Somali Republic (now Somaliland)
- Detained at: Guantanamo
- Other name: Mohammed Sulaymon Barre
- ISN: 567
- Status: Released

Mohamed Saleban Bare (known to the Pentagon as Mohammed Sulaymon Barre) (Somali: Maxamed Saleebaan Barre) is a Somali refugee who was held in extrajudicial detention in the United States Guantanamo Bay detention camps, in Cuba.

Joint Task Force Guantanamo counter-terror analysts report that he was born on December 27, 1964, in Burao, Somaliland.

According to the Washington Post the allegations against Barre are internally inconsistent. He is accused of involvement with al Qaeda, when it was based in Sudan, in 1994 and 1995, when United Nations documents confirm he was living in a U.N. refugee camp in Pakistan.

== Barre's refugee status ==
The United Nations High Commission for Refugees wrote The Pentagon, on December 20, 2006, seeking information on why Barre, and another man were being detained in Guantanamo. The UNHCR had not known until December 2006 that the Americans were holding internationally recognized refugees in Guantanamo. Barre was granted UN refugee status in Pakistan in 1994. Mammar Ameur was granted UN refugee status in Pakistan in 1996. A third captive, Fethi Boucetta, was one of the 38 captives who was determined not have been an "enemy combatant" after all.

== Al Barakat removed from the USA's watchlist of organizations tied to terrorism ==
One of the justifications for Barre's continued detention was that American intelligence analysts suspected that Dahabshiil, the Somalia-based hawala he worked for had ties to Al Barakat, another Somalia-based hawala that had its assets frozen, and some of its agents arrested, because it was suspected of laundering money for terrorists. On August 28, 2006, the BBC reported that Al Barakat had been removed from the US terrorist organization watchlist. The BBC's report stated that Al Barakat made the watchlist because American intelligence analysts had suspected it had been used to finance the 9-11 hijackers, but that the 9/11 Commission had investigated this theory and found it baseless. Some al Barakat agents were also individually listed as suspected terrorist. The owner of Al Barakat, Ahmed Nur Ali Jimaale, said that the company's agent in Sweden was the last to be cleared of suspicion.

== Letter to President Obama from Mohammed's father ==
On June 26, 2009, the Washington Post published a letter to United States President Barack Obama from Mohammed's father, Sulaymon Barre Ali.

== New habeas corpus petition ==
On June 28, 2008, the Washington Post reported that the Supreme Court's ruling in Boumediene v. Bush would allow Mohammed Sulaymon Barre to file a habeas corpus petition. J. Wells Dixon will be representing him.

On July 15, 2008, Emilou Maclean filed a "NOTICE OF FILING OF MOTION FOR ENTRY OF PROTECTIVE ORDER ON CONSENT" on behalf of Mohammed Sulaymon Barre (ISN 567) in Civil Action No. 08-cv-1153 (HHK).

On December 30, 2008, United States Department of Justice official Daniel M. Barish informed the court that the DoJ had filed "factual returns" in seven habeas cases, including Mohammed Sulaymon Barre's.

== Repatriation ==
Carol Rosenberg, writing in the Miami Herald reported that Barre was one of twelve men transferred from Guantanamo on December 19, 2009. Rosenberg reported that Barre and another Somali (Ismael Arale) had arrived in Somaliland, where they were promptly released and rejoined their families in Hargeisa (capital of the region). She reported that, according to local Somaliland newspapers, the two Somalis had been transferred to a third country, and had arrived in Somaliland on a plane provided by the International Committee of the Red Cross.

The other eleven men were: Ayman Batarfi, Jamal Alawi Mari, Farouq Ali Ahmed, Muhammaed Yasir Ahmed Taher, Fayad Yahya Ahmed al Rami, Riyad Atiq Ali Abdu al Haf, Abdul Hafiz, Sharifullah, Mohamed Rahim, Mohammed Hashim and Ismael Arale. Abdul Hafiz, Sharifullah, Mohamed Rahim and Mohammed Hashim were Afghans. Asmael Arale was the other Somali.

The other six men were Yemenis.

After his release Barre described Guantanamo as a "living hell", and noted: "Some of my colleagues in the prison lost their sight, some lost their limbs and others ended up mentally disturbed. I'm OK compared to them."
