= Thomas Joscelyn =

American counterterrorism analyst (born 1976)

- Born: Thomas Joscelyn; 1976 (age 49–50); New York, U.S.
- Occupation: Senior fellow at JustSecurity.org
- Writing career
- Subjects: Counterterrorism, political science
- Notable work: Final Report of the United States House Select Committee on the January 6 Attack

Thomas Joscelyn (born 1976) is an American counterterrorism expert. He leads the Civil Defense Institute, a nonpartisan investigative research group launched in September 2026. He also is an executive editor at JustSecurity.org, an initiative of the Reiss Center on Law and Security at New York University School of Law. As a former senior fellow at the Foundation for Defense of Democracies, Joscelyn founded and was a senior editor for FDD's Long War Journal, a publication dealing with counterterrorism and related issues. He has served as a trainer for the FBI Counterterrorism Division, as well as being a principal author of the final report for the United States House Select Committee on the January 6 Attack.

Joscelyn's work has been published in publications including The New York Times, Politico, The Daily Beast, and The Weekly Standard. He has also been cited by The Washington Post, The Associated Press, Reuters, USA Today, and Time. In 2023, he was featured in an interview on 60 Minutes.

== Career ==
Joscelyn previously worked as an economist before shifting to foreign policy, co-authoring a seminal study on the economics of thoroughbred horse racing. He became acquainted with Liz Cheney during the 2000s, causing him to later be introduced to other members of the United States House Select Committee on the January 6 Attack and eventually get hired to help write the final report published on December 22, 2022.

== Works ==
Title	Year	Publisher	ISBN
What President Obama Doesn't Know About Guantanamo	2010	Encounter Books	978-1-594-03502-9
Enemies Near and Far: How Jihadist Groups Strategize, Plan, and Learn	2022	Columbia University Press	978-0-231-19524-9
