= Usayd al-Adani =

Former leader of Al-Qaeda

- Died: March 2, 2017; Wadi Yashbum, Shabwa Governorate
- Other names: Mossad al-Adani
- Known for: AQAP bombmaker

Usayd al-Adani (died March 2, 2017) was a senior leader of Al-Qaeda in the Arabian Peninsula.

He was killed by a missile launched from a surveillance drone, on March 2, 2017. His killing attracted additional scrutiny as one of the seven other individuals killed by the missile was Yasir al-Silmi, said to be another name for an individual formerly held in extrajudicial detention in Guantanamo, Mohamed Tahar.

After his death American officials claimed al-Adani was not just the leader of AQAP's efforts in Abyan Province, but that he was also an experienced bomb-maker. Courtney Kube, reporting for NBC News reported that he was killed in the village of Wadi Yashbum in Shabwa Governorate.
