= Al-Wade'a district =

Coordinates: 13°45′N 46°00′E

Al Wade'a District مديرية الوديعة
- District
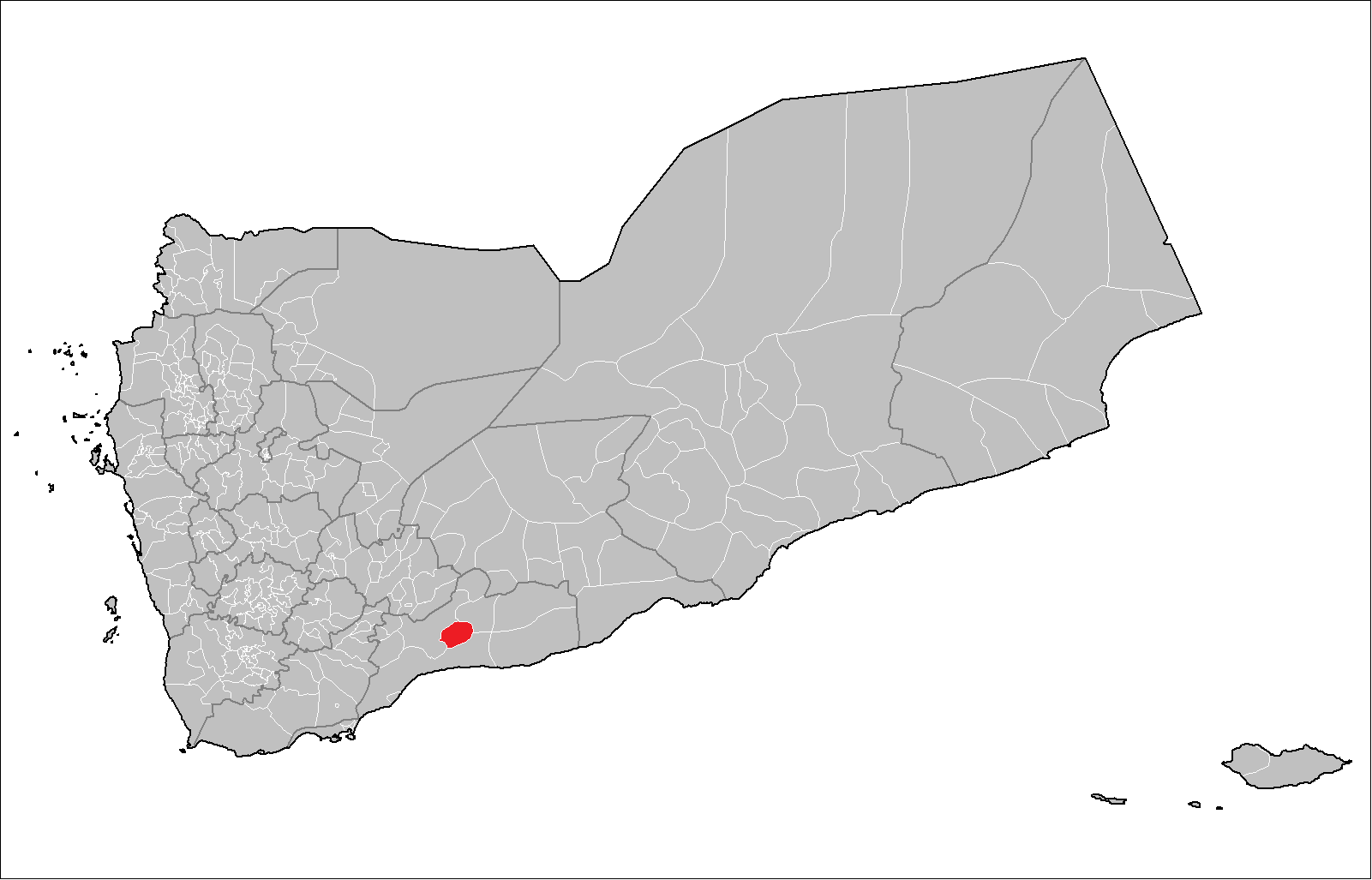
- Country: Yemen
- Governorate: Abyan

Population (2003)
  - Total: 23,400
- Time zone: UTC+3 (Yemen Standard Time)

Al Wade'a District is a district of the Abyan Governorate, Yemen. As of 2003, the district had a population of 23,400 inhabitants. The former president of Yemen Abdrabbuh Mansur Hadi comes from Thukain, which lies in Al Wade'a District.
