= Mudiyah district =

Coordinates: 13°55′N 46°10′E

Mudiyah District
- District
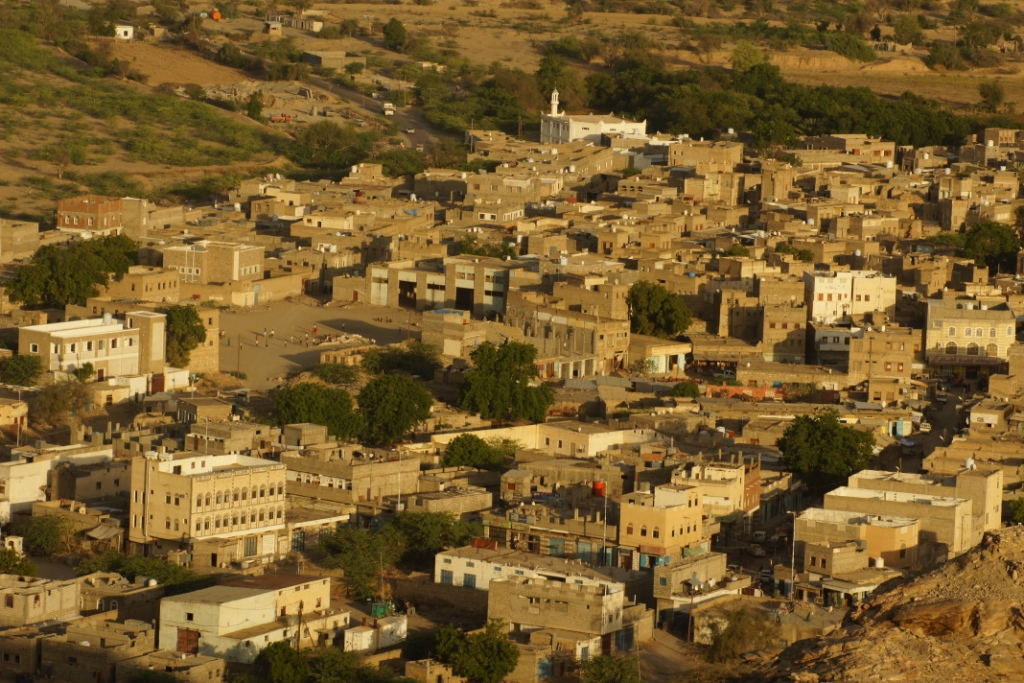

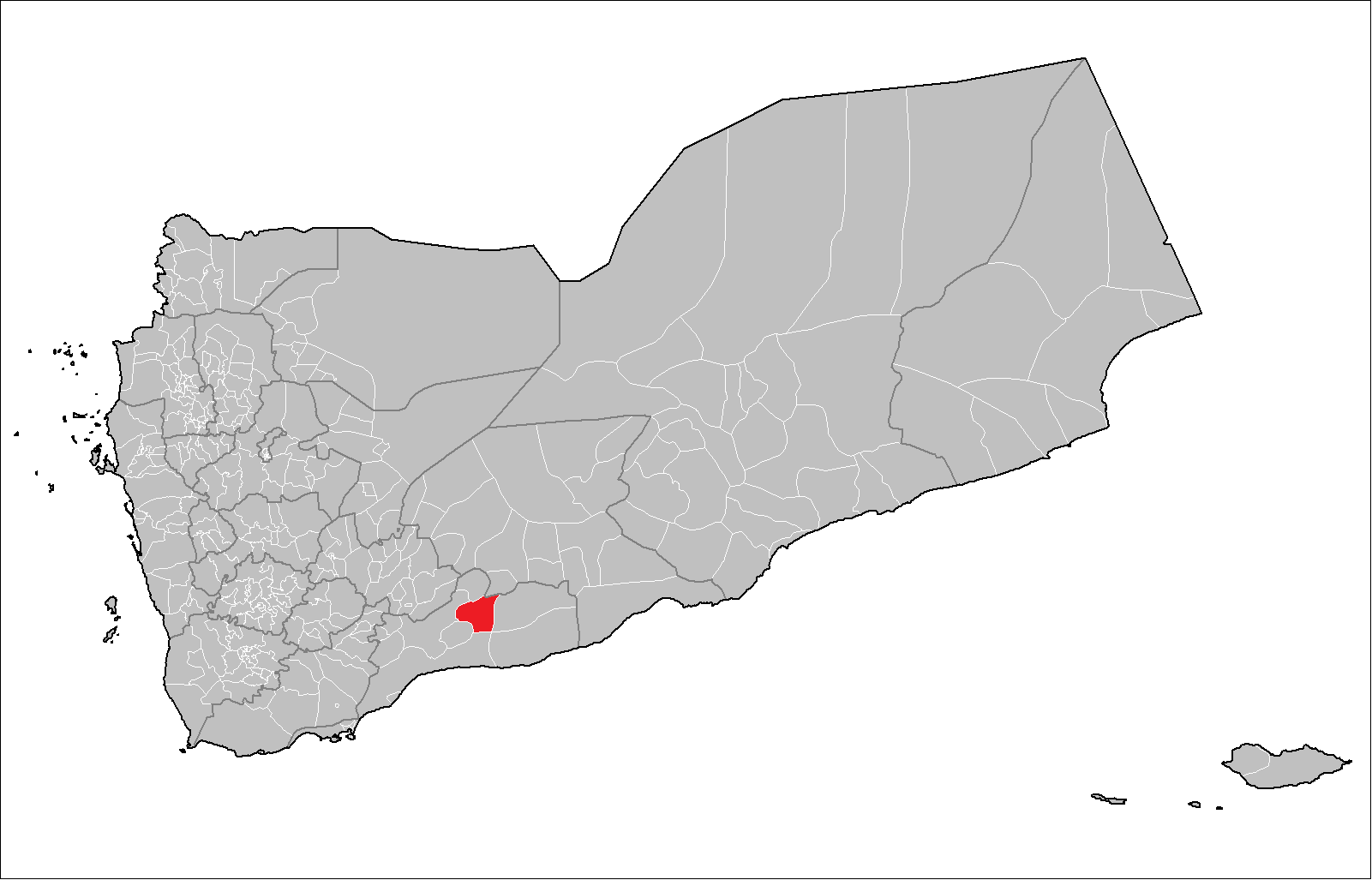
- Country: Yemen
- Governorate: Abyan

Population (2003)
  - Total: 34,879
- Time zone: UTC+3 (Yemen Standard Time)

Mudiyah District is a district of the Abyan Governorate, Yemen. As of 2003, the district had a population of 34,879 inhabitants.

Localities:

- Mudiyah
- Rashnah
