= Amer Aziz =

Pakistani physician

- Born: Pakistan
- Arrested: 21 October 2002; CIA
- Citizenship: Pakistani
- Charge: Extrajudicial detention

Amer Aziz is an orthopedic surgeon who is based in Lahore. He earned his medical degree in the United Kingdom and, according to The Washington Times, is a British citizen. In 2002 the Associated Press profiled Aziz when it became known that he had treated Osama bin Laden and other Al-Qaeda leaders. The Associated Press described Aziz as "a prominent Pakistani physician". The Los Angeles Times called him "Pakistan's foremost orthopedic surgeon".

The New York Post asserted that Aziz became radicalized when he traveled to Kosovo to treat wounded Muslims during its war of independence from Yugoslavia.

== Time in Afghanistan ==
Aziz had been paying visits to Afghanistan to treat mujahideen fighters since the Soviet Union invaded the country in 1979. Aziz was seized by American security officials on 21 October 2002, held, and interrogated by officers of both the FBI and the CIA. Aziz refuted the speculation that bin Laden was suffering from kidney disease or some other serious ailment. He claimed that he had examined bin Laden on two occasions, first in 1999 and then in November 2001.

In 2005, the Los Angeles Times reported that Aziz had traveled to perform emergency medical work when remote, Pakistani-controlled Kashmir was hit by an earthquake that killed 86,000 people. They reported on tensions between him and US forces, who were also providing emergency services, due to his known past association with Islamists. His field hospital was in a camp run by the Jamaat-ud-Dawa—a group associated with Lashkar e taiba.
