= Somali detainees at Guantanamo Bay =

There were a total of four Somali detainees in Guantanamo of a total of 778 detainees that have been held in the Guantanamo Bay detention camps, in Cuba since the camps opened on January 11, 2002.

The camp population peaked in 2004 at approximately 660. Only nineteen new suspects, all "high value detainees" have been transferred there since the United States Supreme Court's ruling in Rasul v. Bush. As of January 2008 the camp population stands at approximately 285.

When the DoD was forced to publish its first official list of detainees, on May 15, 2006, it listed two detainees from Somalia. In 2006 and 2007 two more detainees from Somalia were transferred to Guantanamo from the CIA's network of "black sites".

== Somali detainees in Guantanamo ==
isn	name	arrival date	transfer date	notes
567	Mohammed Sulaymon Barre	unknown	2009-12-19	Barre was one of approximately a dozen captives whose arrival at Guantanamo was undocumented.; Barre was repatriated to Somalia in November 2008.
704	Muhamed Hussein Abdallah	2002-08-05	2008-11-04	Abdallah was repatriated to Somalia in November 2008.
10023	Gouled Hassan Dourad	2006-09-06		Transferred to Guantanamo, together with thirteen other "high value detainees" formerly held in CIA custody, on September 6, 2006.
10027	Abdullahi Sudi Arale	2007-05-??	2009-12-19	Arale was the fourth last captive to be transferred to Guantanamo.; Arale was repatriated to Somalia in December 2009.
